= Geraldine Pindell Trotter =

American civil rights activist and editor

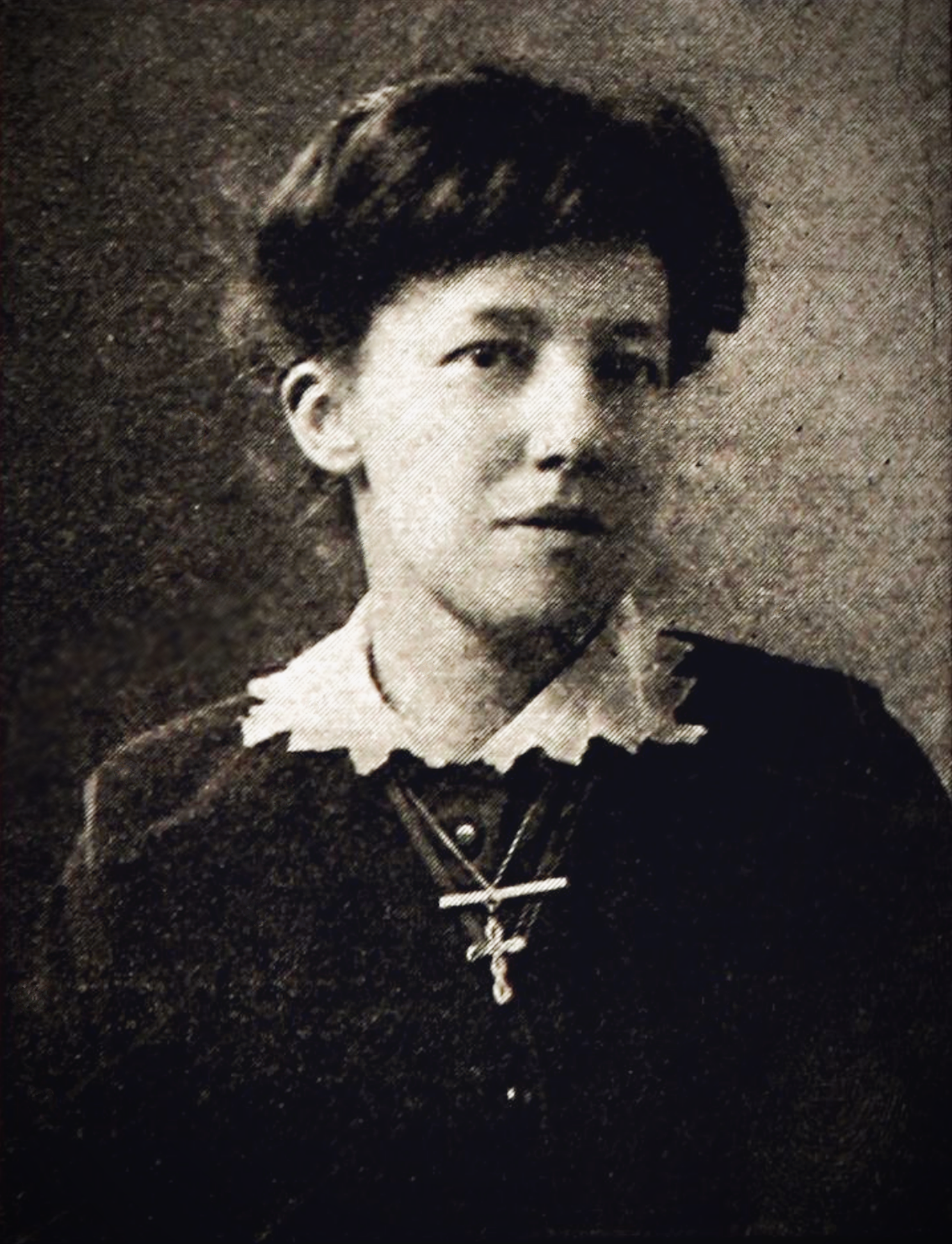
- Born: Geraldine Louise Pindell; October 3, 1873
- Died: October 8, 1918 (aged 45)
- Resting place: Fairview Cemetery, Boston, Massachusetts.
- Organization: Boston Guardian
- Spouse: William Monroe Trotter

Geraldine Pindell Trotter (1872–1918) was an American civil rights activist and editor. Pindell Trotter was an integral fixture of Boston's African-American upper class at the turn of the 20th century. Pindell Trotter is most known for her role as the associate editor of the Boston Guardian, which was founded by her husband William Monroe Trotter.

== Early life ==
Born Geraldine Pindell on October 3, 1873, to Charles Edward Pindell and Mary Francis Pindell. Pindell Trotter received her initial education in Everett, Massachusetts at the Everett Grammar School, then matriculated to a local business college. For ten years after completing her studies, Pindell Trotter worked as an accountant for the Eli Cooley Company. During this time, Pindell Trotter met W. E. B. Du Bois and the two kept in touch for years after he finished his studies at Harvard. Du Bois later recalled his desire to have courted her and lamented his inability to do so. Pindell Trotter, having known William Monroe Trotter since childhood, married him following his graduation from Harvard. Both individuals' families were supportive, despite the fact that the Pindell's were Northern in origin and the Trotter's Southern.

The young pair moved into the middle class Dorchester area of Boston following their marriage, at 97 Sawyer Avenue. Monroe Trotter shortly entered into the real estate business, working with mostly white clients. As Monroe Trotter's real estate venture increasingly garnered success, Pindell Trotter stopped working. Entertaining elite guests occupied a significant amount of Pindell Trotter's time thereafter. Notable individuals Pindell Trotter entertained included Du Bois and his family, but also included the eminent African-American lawyer Archibald Grimke and his family.

The Trotters remained childless throughout their marriage, and Pindell Trotter told friends she had no desire to have children, as their busy lives would prevent them from properly caring for children.

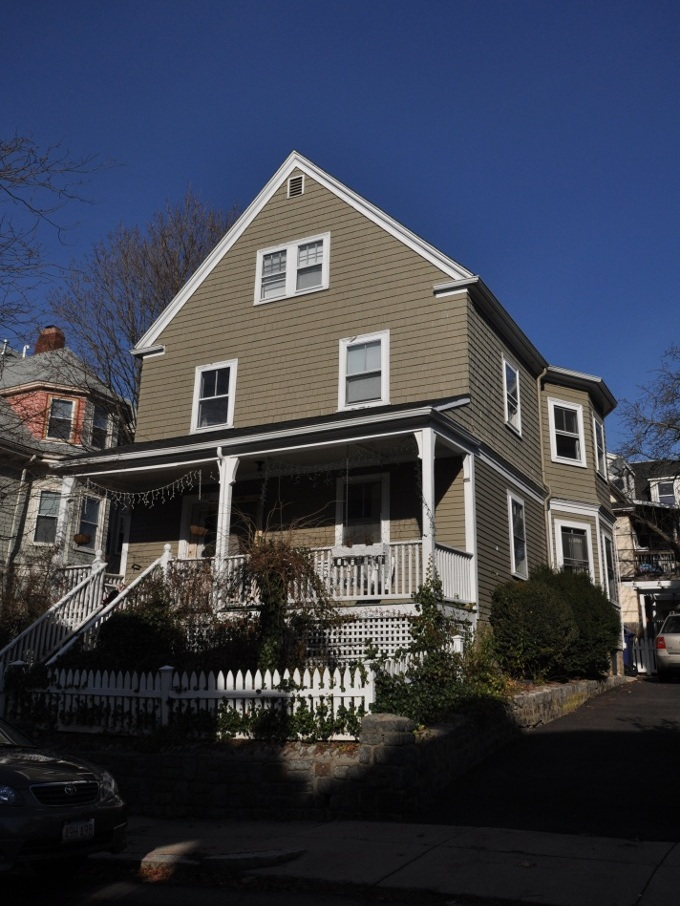
Boston, MA Trotter House

== Philanthropy ==
Pindell Trotter aided the City of Boston and surrounding areas often over the course of her life. In Roxbury, Pindell Trotter imparted her skills upon a local community aid center, St. Monica's Home. A bastion for African American women and children in need of care, St. Monica's in Dorchester was episcopalian, mirroring Pindell Trotter's religion. Pindell Trotter, variably, was also involved in the Public School Association, the Boston Literary and Historical Society, Women's Anti Lynching League, and the Equal Rights Association.

Another cause Pindell Trotter dedicated herself to was the welfare of African-American soldiers in World War I and the Soldiers Comfort Units, notably aiding the 519th engineers at Fort Devens. Pindell Trotter, with her husband William, also demonstrated against a second run showing of The Birth of a Nation, a depiction of the origin of the Ku Klux Klan in the South.

== Boston Guardian ==
George W. Forbes created The Boston Guardian in 1901 and Monroe Trotter quickly became involved. From its onset, the newspaper took an anti-placation approach, publishing scathing political articles on the racism facing African Americans. In the wake of the Boston Riot of 1903, at which Monroe Trotter was arrested, Pindell Trotter took her husband's place as editor of the paper. Moreover, Pindell Trotter assumed bookkeeping duties.

Forbes became progressively alienated by Monroe Trotter's activist activity, such as the interruption of a speech by Booker T. Washington at the Columbus Avenue African Methodist Episcopal Zion Church, and divested from the paper as its profits decreased. With Monroe Trotter recurrently in jail for his activities, and Forbes gone, Pindell Trotter assumed most of the paper's required duties and became a key aspect to the future direction of the paper. Pindell Trotter's bookkeeping skills were invaluable to the paper's continuance as her husband was, by accounts, terrible with money management. Pindell Trotter also wrote columns on fashion and household management, attempting to attract female readership at her husband's behest.

The Guardian, under direction of the Trotters, often disparaged the eminence of Booker T. Washington in the public domain. Washington's ideation of working for equality without pressing for it stood in direct opposition to the Trotter's philosophy. Booker T. Washington himself worked tirelessly against the newspaper's agenda, which included militant civil rights promotion and other rights causes. Du Bois asked the Trotter's to join the recently founded NAACP, however the Trotter's refused over objection to the organization's white leadership.

== Financial woes and loss of friendship ==
Eventually, the paper became unprofitable, even with addition of Pindell Trotter's business skills. Monroe Trotter refused to raise the subscription price of the paper for years, and the Trotter's business suffered for it. The Trotters were forced to sell their home to pay back debts incurred. Subsequently, Monroe Trotter also let his real estate business fade in pursuit of the racial justice he desired through the paper. The formerly lavish pair found themselves renting, often without money on hand to pay for rooms. Now, the two were unable to entertain anyone, much less the dignitaries they had entertained before.

Over time, Monroe Trotter alienated Pindell Trotter's friends one by one. Monroe Trotter's fervent belief system often put him at odds with many, including Pindell Trotter's good friend Archibald Grimke, who was in turn driven to Washington's camp. Others including the wife of Clement Morgan, a prominent Boston African-American Lawyer, punished Geraldine by refusing to invite her to elite events in light of her husband's ever increasing number of strained relationships. Pindell Trotter's longtime friend W. E. B. Du Bois and his family even ceased to visit, as Trotter vexed Du Bois over matters of policy. Pindell Trotter's relationship with Du Bois faded eventually in the absence of Du Bois's summer visits.

== Centenary of William Lloyd Garrison ==
As Monroe Trotter ended her friendships, Pindell Trotter grew closer to him. In a notable instance for her husband, Pindell Trotter aided in the centenary of the birth of noted white abolitionist William Lloyd Garrison. The festival was held on a rainy day, and Pindell Trotter spoke in public at the coolly attended ceremony. Pindell Trotter said of the day ""as God looked back over the years of Garrison, he thought such a day as this would better stand for his life."

Pindell Trotter challenged those at the Garrison ceremony with a call to action, saying, "how many of us are now willing to do for our own what that man did for us? How many of us are willing to stand out against the broadcloth mob, to stand by what is right in spite of the criticism of the many?" Pindell Trotter further implored African Americans "who have had the advantages of education, who have seen life in its broadest light, to be willing to sacrifice and to care for our race."

== Death and legacy ==
Geraldine Pindell Trotter died October 8, 1918, during the Spanish flu pandemic. Pindell Trotter was only forty-six at the time of her death. She was buried in the Fairview Cemetery of Hyde Park. Her former friend W. E. B Du Bois reminisced in his autobiography that she, "had given up all thought of children," and that she had forfeited her "comfortable home," to help her husband, "in utter devotion, living and lunching with him in the Guardian office, and knowing hunger and cold." Du Bois said of their ended union that it was, "a magnificent partnership, and she died to pay for it."

The Trotter's first home in Dorchester, the William Monroe Trotter House, was designated a National Historic Landmark in recognition of their significance in the civil rights cause.
