= William Monroe Trotter House =

Historic house in Massachusetts, United States

- U.S. National Register of Historic Places
- U.S. National Historic Landmark
- Boston Landmark
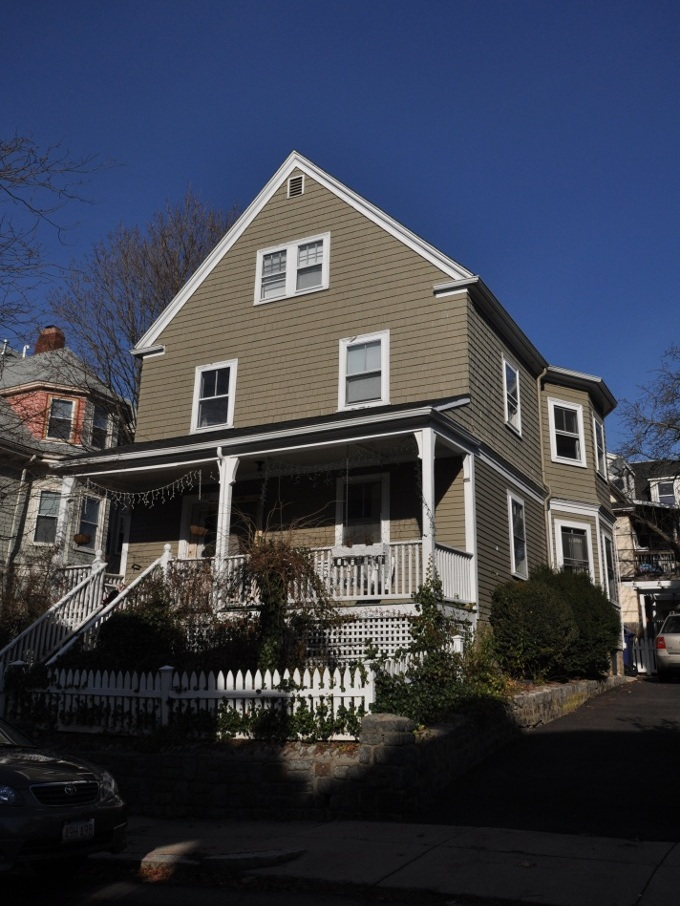
- William Monroe Trotter House in 2012

- Location within Massachusetts Location within the United States
- Location: 97 Sawyer Ave., Dorchester, Massachusetts
- Coordinates: 42°18′47″N 71°3′46″W
- Built: c. 1890s
- NRHP reference No.: 76002003

Significant dates
- Added to NRHP: May 11, 1976
- Designated NHL: May 11, 1976
- Designated BOSL: October 25, 1977

The William Monroe Trotter House is a historic house at 97 Sawyer Avenue, atop Jones Hill in the Dorchester neighborhood of Boston. It was the home of African-American journalist and civil rights activist William Monroe Trotter (1872–1934). He and his wife Geraldine Louise Pindell moved into the two-story wood-frame home when they were married in June 1899. The house was designated a National Historic Landmark in 1976 for its association with Trotter, whose activism was influential in the founding of the National Association for the Advancement of Colored People.

== Description ==
The Trotter House is a 2 1/2-story balloon-framed wooden structure, resting on a rubble granite foundation. It is set high on Jones Hill, where Trotter wrote that he could see "from the sitting room window all over the country as far as Blue Hill and from my bed-room window over all the bay down to ... Deer Island." A single-story porch extends across the width of the main (southern) facade, with stairs on the left providing access to the entrance. The facade is two bays wide, with the front door in the left bay, and sash windows in the right bay and on the upper level. A pair of smaller gable windows occupy the center of the gable section.

The east side of the house has a projecting half-hexagonal bay in its northern extent. The left (west) side of the house is relatively plain, and extends further back than the east side, because of a two-story ell at the rear of the house. The interior stairwell on the left side is illuminated by a square window with colored panes.

The house was designated a National Historic Landmark and listed on the National Register of Historic Places in 1976 for its association with William Monroe Trotter. In 1977, the exterior and the grounds were designated a Boston Landmark by the Boston Landmarks Commission. It is not open to the public.

== William Monroe Trotter ==
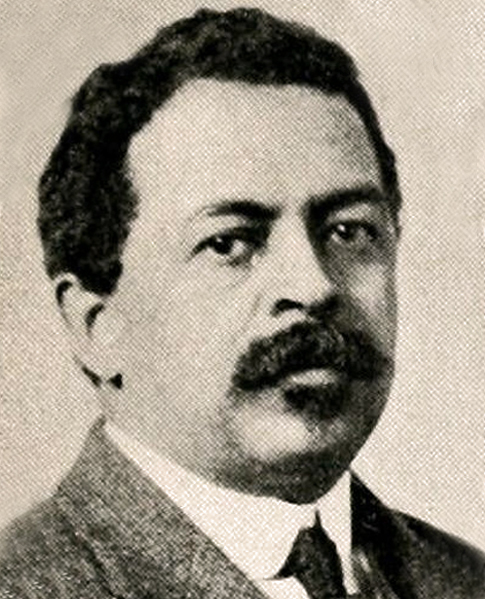
William Monroe Trotter in 1915

William Monroe Trotter was born in Ohio. His father, James Monroe Trotter, was a veteran of the American Civil War, serving in the 55th Massachusetts Infantry Regiment, and was an activist for African American participation in civil affairs. Trotter graduated high school at the top of an otherwise all-white class, and attended Harvard University, where he graduated in 1895 with honors and was the first African American elected a Phi Beta Kappa. He helped organize the "Boston Literary and Historical Association" in 1901, a forum for militant political thinkers, including W. E. B. Du Bois and Oswald Garrison Villard. The same year, he founded the Boston Guardian, a weekly newspaper in which he regularly criticized educator Booker T. Washington for his accommodationist policies. He was also a founder, along with Du Bois, of the Niagara Movement in 1905—a precursor of the National Association for the Advancement of Colored People (NAACP). He was an uncompromising voice in the fight for civil rights, but was notoriously difficult to work with, and played no role in the NAACP after its founding.

Trotter purchased 97 Sawyer Avenue in 1899, and moved in with his wife Geraldine. His dedication to the cause of civil rights drained his finances, however, and he eventually lost not just investment properties, but his home as well. After a high-profile meeting with President Woodrow Wilson in 1913 drew news coverage for the heated exchanges between the two men, Trotter became an increasingly marginalized voice of protest, and died in 1934.

== Gallery ==
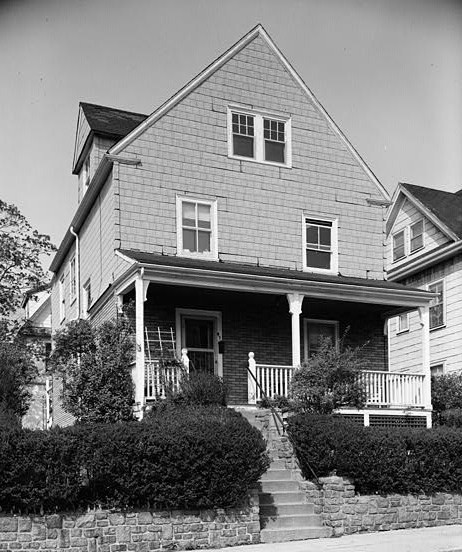
William Monroe Trotter House in 1980

== See also ==
- List of National Historic Landmarks in Boston
- National Register of Historic Places listings in southern Boston, Massachusetts
