= Butler R. Wilson =

American attorney

Butler Roland Wilson
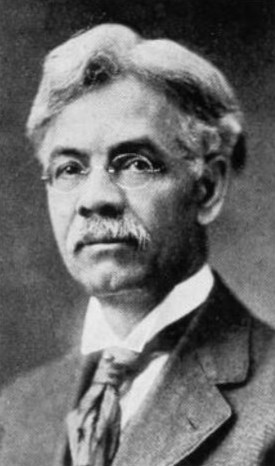
- Butler R. Wilson c. 1916
- Born: July 22, 1861; Greensboro, Georgia, U.S.
- Died: October 31, 1939 (aged 78); Boston, U.S.
- Resting place: Forest Hills Cemetery
- Education: Atlanta University; Boston University School of Law
- Known for: Civil rights activist; Humanitarian
- Spouse: Mary Evans Wilson
- Children: 6

Butler Roland Wilson (1861–1939) was an attorney, civil rights activist, and humanitarian based in Boston, Massachusetts. Born in Georgia, he came to Boston for law school and lived there for the remainder of his life. For over fifty years, he worked to combat racial discrimination in Massachusetts. He was one of the first African-American members of the American Bar Association. Wilson was a founding member and president of the Boston branch of the National Association for the Advancement of Colored People (NAACP).

== Early life ==
Butler Roland Wilson was born in Greensboro, Georgia, on July 11, 1861, to Dr. John R. and Mary Jackson Wilson, free people of color. His father was a well-known physician and civic leader in the Atlanta area. Wilson attended Atlanta University, a historically black college, where he was captain of the varsity baseball team and was voted class orator. He received his B.A. degree in 1881 and M.A. in 1884.

Against the wishes of his parents, who wanted him to become a minister, Wilson traveled to Boston to earn his LL.B. at the Boston University School of Law. There he befriended the attorney and civil rights activist Archibald H. Grimké, and began writing for Grimké's Republican newspaper, The Hub. He graduated with honors in 1884, and was admitted to the Massachusetts Bar Association the same year.

== Marriage and family ==
On June 27, 1894, Wilson and Mary P. Evans were married by Archibald Grimké's brother, the Reverend Francis James Grimké. The couple moved to 13 Rutland Square in Boston's South End, where they raised their six children. Mary Wilson became a well-known activist in her own right; she was a founding member of the Women's Service Club, NAACP Boston branch.

== Career ==
Soon after his admission to the bar, Wilson briefly partnered with Archibald Grimké. He also worked for several years with Judge George Lewis Ruffin, the first black judge in the United States, and his son, Hubert S. Ruffin. In 1887, after both George L. Ruffin and his son died, Wilson opened his own criminal law practice at 34 School Street. He placed advertisements in The Woman's Era, an African-American woman's newspaper edited by Josephine St. Pierre Ruffin. He built a successful practice serving clients of all races, and became one of the most respected attorneys in New England. One of his early clients was Moorfield Storey, a white Boston attorney who was later elected president of the American Bar Association (ABA) and founding president of the National Association for the Advancement of Colored People (NAACP). In 1898, Massachusetts Governor Roger Wolcott appointed Wilson as a master of chancery.

=== ABA membership ===
In 1911, the American Bar Association (ABA) admitted three African Americans to its membership: Butler Wilson, William Henry Lewis, a U.S. Assistant Attorney General, who were both of Boston; and William R. Morris of Minneapolis. At the time, the executive committee did not know that these candidates were "colored men." In January 1912, upon learning that Lewis was black, the ABA's executive committee voted to rescind his membership. That August, they rescinded the memberships of Wilson and Morris as well.

Members of the Boston NAACP and the Massachusetts Bar Association mounted a vigorous defense of the two Boston attorneys. U.S. Attorney General George W. Wickersham sent a letter to all 4,700 members of the ABA in support of Lewis; Moorfield Storey circulated a similar letter on Wilson's behalf that was signed by leading members of the Massachusetts Bar. Without the support of a powerful defender, Morris, the Minnesotan, was forced to resign. Soon afterward, the ABA ruled that applicants for membership must declare their race. Former Massachusetts Attorney General Albert E. Pillsbury, who was opposed to racial restrictions, resigned in protest over the issue in 1913. The ABA continued to discriminate against other applicants of color for several decades.

=== NAACP leadership ===
Wilson and his wife were among the organizers of the Boston branch of the NAACP, the organization's first local branch. The Wilsons were the most prominent African-American leaders of the organization at a time when its leadership was dominated by whites. The Boston branch was formally founded on February 8, 1912, with Francis Jackson Garrison, son of the abolitionist William Lloyd Garrison, as its first president. Wilson was the branch's first secretary, and joined the national board in 1913. In the early 1920s he became branch president and held that post until 1936. (Note: Sources differ as to the official start and end dates of Wilson's presidency. His obituary in The Crisis (1939) states simply that he was branch president for "more than a dozen years". According to Clarence G. Contee's biography of Wilson in The Crisis (1974), he was branch secretary from 1926 to 1939 and joined the national board of directors in the 1920s. In African-Americans in Boston: More Than 350 Years (1991), Robert C. Hayden writes that Wilson presided over the Boston NAACP from 1916 to 1936, "the longest presidential tenure in its history.")

Under Wilson's leadership, the Boston NAACP strove to improve educational opportunities for black children in Boston, protested against offensive books and films, opposed legislation banning interracial marriage, and fought segregation in housing, hospitals, and the YMCA.

=== Civil rights work ===
One of Wilson's first cases was a discrimination lawsuit against a skating rink in Boston. He and Grimké won the suit in the Municipal Court, but the Superior Court dismissed it on appeal. In 1893, Wilson aided William H. Lewis, who was studying law at Harvard, in his suit against a white barber shop in Harvard Square that refused to serve him. Lewis and Wilson successfully lobbied the state legislature for an amendment expanding the reach of existing anti-discrimination law to include barber shops and other public places.

In 1913, acting on behalf of the NAACP, Wilson and fellow attorney Clement G. Morgan persuaded the directors of Boston's YMCA to change its discriminatory swimming pool policy. The following year, he led a successful campaign to remove a songbook containing racial epithets from Boston's public schools. In several cases he opposed the extradition of black defendants to Southern states, arguing that they were likely to be lynched.

Wilson was one of the main leaders of a spirited but unsuccessful effort to ban the race-baiting film The Birth of a Nation from Boston theaters. He led a delegation of NAACP members to Mayor James Curley's office in 1915, and urged state legislators to support the ban. Other local leaders of the campaign included William Monroe Trotter, Lewis, and Morgan. In 1921, Trotter succeeded in having the film banned in Boston by making an alliance with the Catholic Church.

During World War I, Wilson opposed the creation of segregated training camps for black officers. (Note: Wilson devoted much of his career to fighting racial segregation. According to the Boston Globe, however, citing poor treatment of black soldiers by white officers, he called for the War Department to create a division "composed entirely of colored troops, and officered from top to bottom by colored officers." See "Call for Division of Colored Troops; Treatment of the Negro Soldiers Protested; Meeting of 3000 in Tremont Temple Hears of Race Problems". The Boston Globe. April 22, 1919. p. 7 – via Newspapers.com.)

In the 1920s Wilson worked to defeat bills banning interracial marriage in Massachusetts. Similar bills were passed in some Southern states, considered then part of the eugenics movement as a progressive effort to improve ethnic stock.

=== Other memberships ===
Wilson was a member of many charitable and civic associations. He was a director of the Boston Home for Aged Colored Women; board secretary of the Harriet Tubman House, a settlement house in the South End; and a member of the American Red Cross. He served on the Speakers Committee of the Ford Hall Forum and the executive committee of the South End Improvement Association, and was a charter member and third president of the Boston Literary and Historical Association. He belonged to the Grand United Order of Odd Fellows in America, the Knights of Pythias of North America, South America, Europe, Asia, Africa and Australia, and the Prince Hall Freemasonry. A lifelong Republican, he organized and was a charter member of the Republican Club of Massachusetts. In 1917 he was appointed by Republican Governor Samuel W. McCall to the board of appeals on fire insurance rates, a post he held for the rest of his life.

== Political views ==
Wilson was a vocal supporter of the Republican party and often urged Boston's black men to support Republican candidates. In 1892, speaking at a political rally, he declared that "The negro who votes the Democratic ticket is either a fool or a knave." In the South, white Democrats in control of state legislatures had begun to disenfranchise most blacks and many poor whites by creating barriers to voter registration. This exclusion of blacks from the political process crippled the Republican Party in the South.

Later Wilson aligned with activists such as William H. Lewis, Archibald Grimké, William Monroe Trotter, George Washington Forbes, Clement G. Morgan, and others who were critical of Booker T. Washington's accommodationist approach. He supported the views of Trotter and Forbes in their newspaper, the Boston Guardian. When W. E. B. Du Bois organized the Niagara Movement in 1905, Wilson was one of the original signers. He also served on the organization's Legal Committee.

A firm believer in the power of education, Wilson said it was America's duty to give "every citizen an education commensurate with his character and ability" and "a fair field in which to use it." He supported voting rights for women, and was a member of the Massachusetts Men's League for Women's Suffrage. In 1915 he addressed a meeting of the Boston Equal Suffrage Association for Good Government; the other speakers were Julia Lathrop, director of the U.S. Children's Bureau, and playwright Marion Craig Wentworth.

== Death and legacy ==
Wilson died of pneumonia in Boston on October 31, 1939, aged 79. His home at 13 Rutland Square is marked with a Heritage Guild plaque.

Early in his career, Wilson was instrumental in getting the city to erect a monument to Crispus Attucks and the other victims of the Boston Massacre. The bronze and granite monument stands on Boston Common, near Tremont Street between Avery Street and West Street.
