= Maude Trotter Steward =

Assistant editor of the Boston Guardian (1874 to 1955)

- Born: 1874
- Died: 1955 (aged 80–81)
- Occupation: Newspaper editor
- Relatives: William Monroe Trotter (brother), James Monroe Trotter (father), Theophilus Gould Steward (father-in-law)

Maude Trotter Steward (1874–1955) was the assistant editor of the Boston Guardian, a civil rights newspaper in Boston.

== Early life ==
Steward was born to Virginia Isaacs and James Monroe Trotter, a member of the United States Colored Troops 55th Massachusetts Volunteer Infantry and later, a civil servant. Steward had two siblings, William Monroe Trotter and Virginia Elizabeth (Bessie) Trotter. The Trotter family lived in the South End of Boston and then in the Hyde Park neighborhood.

== Career and activism ==
Steward attended Wellesley College. She was a member of a number of local civic organizations including the St. Mark's Musical and Literary Union, the Boston Literary and Historical Association, the Women's League, and the Boston Equal Rights League. Steward married Dr. Charles Steward, son of Theophilus Gould Steward, novelist and chaplain of the 25th Regiment, in 1907. Steward and Monroe Trotter were staunchly against Booker T. Washington and heckled him during his 1903 visit to Boston. She, her husband and her brother were known as the last of the Boston Radicals.

Steward, and her husband, Dr. Charles Steward, continued to edit William Monroe's newspaper, The Boston Guardian, after his death in 1934. At the time of Steward's death, she was the oldest active African American woman journalist.

In 2023, she was recognized as one of "Boston’s most admired, beloved, and successful Black Women leaders" by the Black Women Lead project.
