= The Boston Courant =

Boston newspaper established in 1995

- Type: Weekly newspaper
- Format: Broadsheet
- Owner(s): David Jacobs; Genevieve Tracy
- Publisher: David Jacobs
- Editor: Jennifer L. Miaola
- Founded: 1995
- Ceased publication: February 2016
- Headquarters: P.O. Box 171018; Back Bay Station; Boston, Massachusetts 02117, United States
- Circulation: 40,000

The Boston Courant was a weekly newspaper in Boston, whose coverage focused on issues of local interest to the Back Bay, Beacon Hill, Downtown, Fenway, South End, and Waterfront neighborhoods. It had a circulation of over 40,000. The Boston Courant announced its closure in February 2016 after losing a wrongful termination lawsuit. In April 2016, the former publisher debuted the Boston Guardian, with similar editorial content and neighborhood coverage.

An African-American newspaper by the same name was founded by George Washington Forbes in 1890 and discontinued some time after 1900.

== Establishment ==
Publisher David Jacobs created the Boston Courant (as the Back Bay Courant—the newspaper later expanded its coverage to include the South End, Bay Village, Fenway, and Beacon Hill) in 1995, with his wife Genevieve Tracy as associate editor. In a Boston Globe article, Jacobs stated that the Courant experienced double-digit growth from 2008 to 2009.

== Sections ==
The paper introduced a real estate section in 2008, named "Open House". Later renamed the "Real Estate Guide", the section featured editorial copy and advertisements from Boston real estate agents as well as maps of upcoming open houses.

== Online ==
In 2004, the publisher, David Jacobs, paid a web designer $50,000 to put the newspaper online, but the site never launched due to the lack of a profitable business plan. Jacobs believed that if the Courant had a website some of the readers would abandon the print format, crippling profitable advertising sales.

== Successor publication ==
In April 2016, the previous publisher of the defunct Boston Courant debuted a reborn publication under the new banner of the Boston Guardian, serving the Back Bay, Beacon Hill, Downtown, Fenway, South End, and North End/Waterfront districts of Boston. The new publication's title stirred up some controversy over the alleged appropriation of a historic journalistic name.
