= James Monroe Trotter =

American government worker

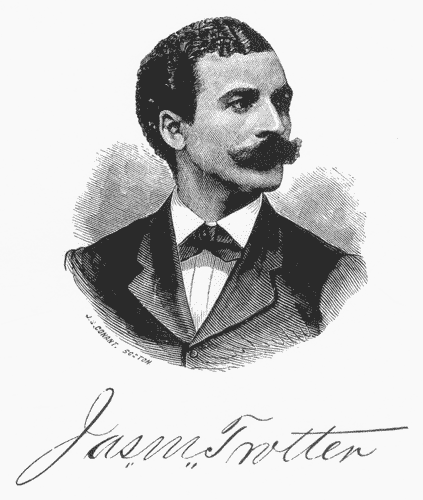

Recorder of Deeds for the District of Columbia
- In office March 3, 1887 – February 7, 1890
- Appointed by: Grover Cleveland
- Preceded by: James Campbell Matthews
- Succeeded by: Blanche Bruce

Personal details
- Born: February 7, 1842 Grand Gulf, Mississippi, U.S.
- Died: February 26, 1892 (aged 50)
- Children: William Monroe Trotter
- Parent(s): Richard S. Trotter, Letitia
- Occupation: Soldier, Music historian, U.S. Postal Worker, U.S. Federal Government Official

James Monroe Trotter (February 7, 1842 – February 26, 1892) was an American teacher, soldier, employee of the United States Post Office Department, a music historian, and Recorder of Deeds in Washington, D.C. Born into slavery in Mississippi, he, his two sisters and their mother Letitia were freed by their master, the child's father, and helped to move to Cincinnati, Ohio. He grew up in freedom, attending school and becoming a teacher.

During the American Civil War, Trotter enlisted in the 55th Massachusetts Volunteer Infantry, the state's second black infantry regiment, and was quickly promoted; he was the second man of color to be promoted to the rank of lieutenant in the U.S. Army. After the war, he married and moved with his wife to Boston. He was the first man of color hired by the Post Office Department (now the United States Postal Service) there and worked with them for many years. He wrote a history of music in the United States, which is still in print, Music and Some Highly Musical People, the first comprehensive history of African-American musicians. In 1886, he was appointed by the Democratic administration of Grover Cleveland as the Recorder of Deeds in Washington, D.C., the highest federal position available at the time for African Americans.

His son William Monroe Trotter became a rights activist and was founder and editor of the Boston Guardian, a progressive African American newspaper.

== Early life and education ==
James Monroe Trotter was born on February 7, 1842, (some sources give Trotter's date of birth as November 8, 1842) in the now-defunct town of Grand Gulf, Mississippi, in Claiborne County, Mississippi, 25 miles south of Vicksburg. James was born into slavery; his mother Letitia was a slave and his father was her white owner, Richard S. Trotter, then unmarried.

After Richard Trotter married in 1854, he freed Letitia and their mixed-race children, James and two younger sisters. He sent them to Cincinnati, in the free state of Ohio. Young James attended Gilmore High School, a famous institution for freed slaves founded by Methodist clergyman Hiram S. Gilmore. There, he studied music with William F. Colburn, training that would serve him well later on. In Cincinnati, James helped to support the family by working as a hotel bellboy and a riverboat cabin boy on a Cincinnati-to-New Orleans run. Around 1856, the family moved on to nearby Hamilton.

Trotter attended Albany Manual Labor Academy in Athens County, Ohio, which was notable for accepting students regardless of race and sex. Despite its name, it offered classical academic classes as well as training in trades.

== Career ==
Trotter taught in schools for colored students in the Ohio counties of Pike, Muskingum, and Ross, where he taught at the city of Chillicothe. During his time in Chillicothe, which had become a center of free blacks and abolitionists, he met his future wife, Virginia Isaacs. Born free in 1842, she was a woman of color, the daughter of Tucker Isaacs and Ann-Elizabeth (Fossett) Isaacs from Charlottesville, Virginia. Tucker was the mixed-race son of David Isaacs, a German Jew, and Nancy West, a free woman of color; they had an established common-law marriage.

Ann-Elizabeth Fossett was also of mixed race; she was born into slavery at Monticello: her father was Joseph Fossett, a grandson of Elizabeth Hemings, and her mother Edith Hern Fossett were both servants important to Thomas Jefferson. All were held as slaves by Jefferson. Her father was one of five male slaves freed in Jefferson's will of 1826, but her mother, siblings and Ann-Elizabeth (and nearly 130 other slaves) were sold on the auction block in 1827. Her father saved his money from working to purchase the freedom of his wife and children, one at a time over years, freeing Ann-Elizabeth in 1837. When all but one son were free, Fossett took his family to Chillicothe, in the free state of Ohio. His son eventually was purchased by friends and given his freedom to join his parents and family.

=== American Civil War ===
During the American Civil War, Trotter traveled from Ohio to Boston, Massachusetts, to enlist in one of the first African-American units of the Union Army, joining the 55th Massachusetts Volunteer Infantry USCT, Company K, in June 1863. Educated and 21, he quickly was promoted from the rank of Private to Sergeant. He was ultimately promoted to 2nd Lieutenant, the second man of color to achieve this rank.

== Marriage and family ==
Upon completing his military service, Trotter returned to Chillicothe, where he married Virginia Isaacs, the great-great-granddaughter of Betty Hemings, in 1868. The couple moved to Boston, Massachusetts, as did Virginia's sister Mary Elizabeth and her husband William H. Dupree, also a veteran lieutenant. The two young couples were part of a wave of migration by southern blacks to Boston after the war, as they saw it as a place of opportunity and tolerance. The Trotters soon had three children together, William Monroe Trotter, Maude Trotter Steward, and Virginia Elizabeth Trotter. Their son William Monroe Trotter attended Harvard University and first went into business. He became a human rights activist and founded the progressive newspaper the Boston Guardian.

== Boston and later years ==
In Boston, Trotter became the first man of color to be employed by the United States Post Office Department there. After eighteen years of service with the USPS, James Trotter found that he was not being promoted as were white co-workers of equal seniority. In an act of protest, he resigned rather than continue in an inferior position.

A multi-talented man, Trotter wrote a book entitled Music and Some Highly Musical People, published in 1878. It is the first comprehensive study of music ever written in the United States. It is still used by students of music history and those interested in tracing the origins of music in the United States, especially African-American music. It has been reissued at least two times, most recently in 1981.

He was appointed in 1887 by President Grover Cleveland as the second African American to be Recorder of Deeds for the District of Columbia, one of the highest federal offices to be held by a man of color at that time. He was preceded in that position by the activist Frederick Douglass, who served from 1881 to 1886. After Trotter, U.S. Senator Blanche Kelso Bruce was appointed to the office, serving from 1890 to 1894.

Trotter died of tuberculosis after his return to Boston.

== Legacy and honors ==
The James M. Trotter Convention Center in Columbus, Mississippi, was named in his honor.

== Notes ==
"James Monroe Trotter (1842–1892) was a prominent 19th-century civil rights advocate. He came to Boston to join the Massachusetts 54th* Regiment, the first African-American corps of soldiers in the Civil War. After the war, Trotter became the highest ranking, non-elected African-American in the federal government in his position as Federal Recorder of Deeds. He was the father of civil-rights leader William Monroe Trotter." – The Bostonian Society, 2007

- Note: Available military records indicate that Trotter mustered into the Massachusetts 55th regiment in June 1863. Thus, the Bostonian Society is apparently in error on his regiment.
