= Laurence H. Banks =

American politician

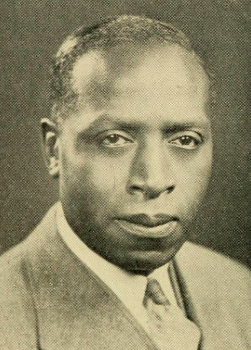

Member of the Boston City Council for Ward 9
- In office 1951–1952
- Preceded by: Daniel F. Sullivan
- Succeeded by: District eliminated

Member of the Massachusetts House of Representatives for the 9th Suffolk District
- In office 1947–1949
- Preceded by: Dennis P. Glynn
- Succeeded by: William A. Glynn

Personal details
- Born: October 31, 1897 Boston
- Died: June 12, 1972 (aged 74) Roxbury
- Party: Republican
- Education: Massachusetts Institute of Technology; Boston University; Suffolk University Law School

Laurence Harold Banks (October 31, 1897 – June 12, 1972) was an American politician who served in the Massachusetts House of Representatives and on the Boston City Council. He was the first African-American elected to the Boston City Council.

== Early life ==
Banks was born on October 31, 1897, in Boston. He attended Boston Public Schools and graduated from The English High School, Massachusetts Institute of Technology, Boston University, and Suffolk University Law School. Outside of politics, Banks worked as an attorney, advertising consultant, accountant, and operated a multigraph service.

== Political career ==
Banks was elected to the Massachusetts House of Representatives in 1946. He was the first African-American elected to the House since William H. Lewis in 1901. In 1948, Banks sought both the Republican and Democratic nominations for his House seat. He was declared the winner of the Democratic primary by 37 votes, however a recount resulted in challenger William A. Glynn picking up 58 votes and Banks only picking up 2, resulting in a 19-vote victory for Glynn. In the general election, Glynn defeated Banks by 886 votes.

In 1949, Banks ran for Ward 9's seat on the Boston City Council. The initial results showed incumbent Daniel F. Sullivan defeated Banks by 22 votes. Banks requested a recount, which reduced Sullivan's margin of victory to 6 votes. Following the recount, election commission chairman J. Joseph Connors declared that there were irregularities worth investigating. According to the commission, there were 29 ballots with marks bearing firmly-written crosses besides Banks's name that were invalidated because they included fainter marks for one of the other 3 candidates. The commission felt that these votes should have been counted for Banks, as the marks for Banks matched those marked in the Mayoral election. However state law required that these votes be invalidated. On January 3, 1949, judge J. Arthur Baker ruled that Banks was the winner of the election and referred the case to the Suffolk County District Attorney's office for “possible criminal action”. However, the city council, on advice of the city law department, chose to swear in Sullivan pending the outcome of his appeal to the Massachusetts Supreme Judicial Court. On June 15, 1951, the Supreme Court ordered the Superior Court to issue a writ of mandamus certifying Banks as the councilor for Ward 9. On July 31, 1951, Banks was issued his certificate of election and was sworn in by Mayor John B. Hynes. The council granted Banks $4,800 in pack pay and $4,000 in legal fees. He ran in the 1951 council election, which was the year the council switched from a 22-member board elected on a district basis to a 9-member at-large council but did not make it out of the preliminary election.

== Later life ==
Banks was an unsuccessful candidate for the Boston City Council in 1953 and 1967 and the Massachusetts House of Representatives in 1955 and 1958. He served as a member of the Republican state committee and was the party's assistant treasurer. In 1967 he was a founding officer of the Unity Bank and Trust Co., the city's first African-American owned bank. Banks died unexpectedly on June 12, 1972, at his home in Roxbury.

== See also ==
- 1947-1948 Massachusetts legislature
