= Gertrude Wright Morgan =

American civil rights activist

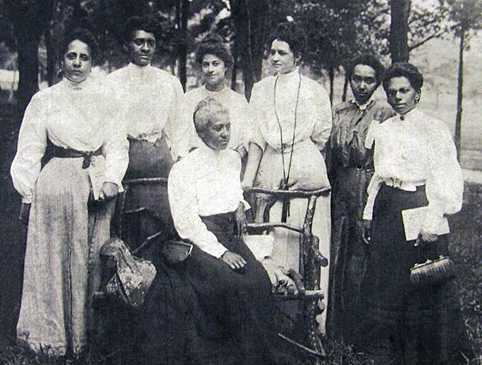
Gertrude Wright Morgan (seated) with other women at the 1906 Niagara Movement Conference at Harper's Ferry

Gertrude Wright Morgan (1861 – 1931) was an American women's suffragist and civil rights activist. She was also a founding member of the NAACP and the Niagara Movement. She was the first African American to enroll and the first to graduate in Springfield, Illinois, and is also believed to have been the first to graduate in all of Illinois.

== Biography ==
Gertrude was born in 1861 in Springfield, Illinois, to Thomas Wright and Sarah Fortune Wright. Her father was formally enslaved, but later bought himself and Gertrude's brother out of bondage. She enrolled in Springfield High School in 1874, the first African American to do so at the school, which was the only high school serving Springfield at the time. At the time, segregation in Springfield schools had only recently been outlawed, and thus Gertrude was often "shunned" by other white students. She graduated in 1877 third in her class of 28, and presented an essay entitled "Unknown Heroes".

After graduation, she applied to become a teacher in Springfield, but African Americans were denied positions. Because of this, she moved to St. Louis, and taught at an all-black school, Charles Sumner High School. Clement Morgan also worked at this school, and after moving to Cambridge, Massachusetts and returning to St. Louis, he married Gertrude in 1897. Both of them moved to Cambridge, where they were civil rights activists.

Gertrude died in 1931, two years after her husband's death.
