= Fairview Cemetery (Boston, Massachusetts) =

Historic cemetery in Massachusetts, United States

- U.S. National Register of Historic Places
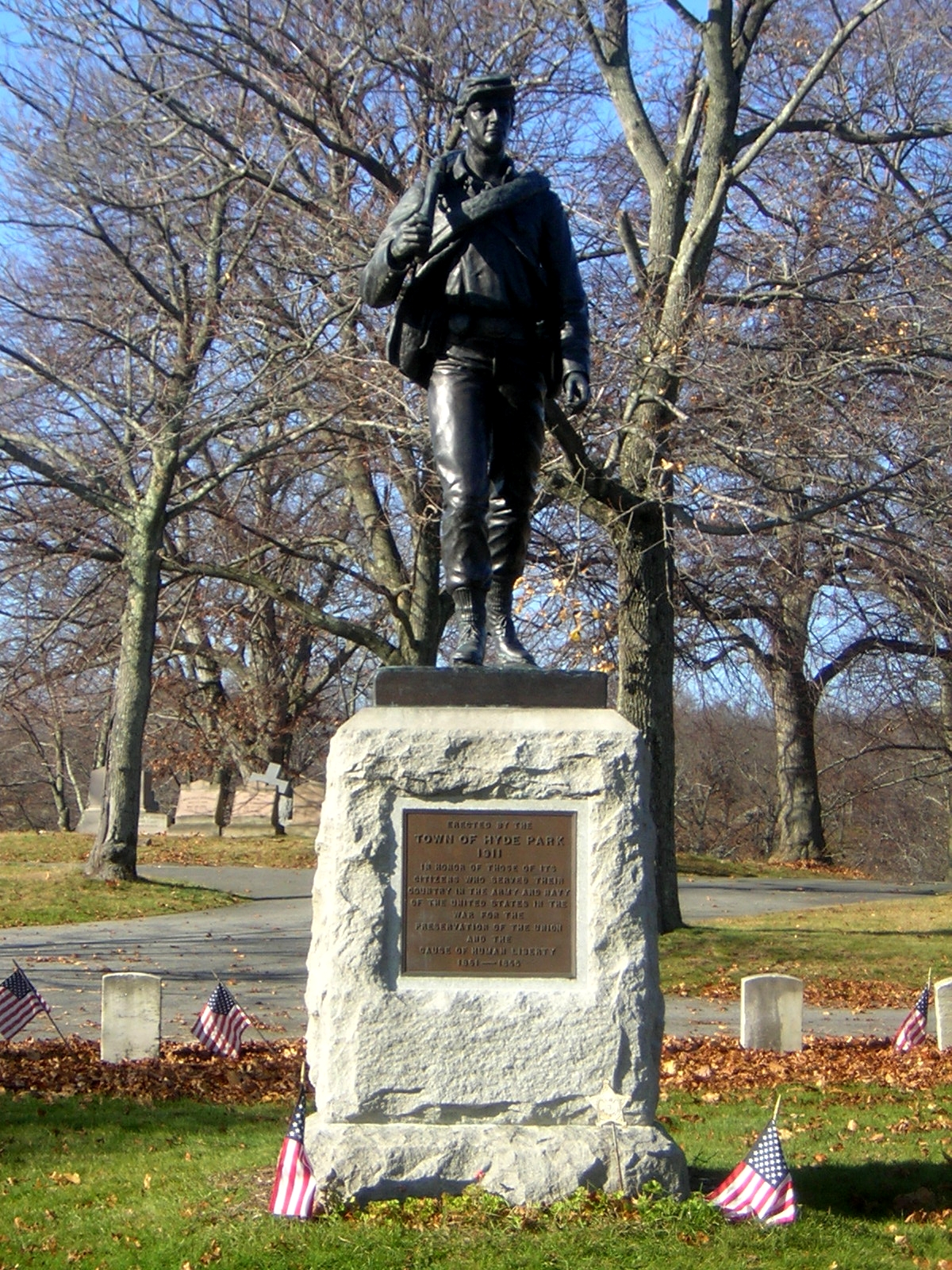

- Location within Massachusetts Location within the United States
- Location: 45 Fairview Avenue, Hyde Park, Massachusetts (extends into Dedham)
- Coordinates: 42°14′44″N 71°08′25″W
- Area: 57.72 acres (23.36 ha)
- Built: 1892
- NRHP reference No.: 09000717
- Added to NRHP: September 16, 2009

Fairview Cemetery is a historic cemetery in the Hyde Park neighborhood of Boston, Massachusetts. A small section of the cemetery is located in neighboring Dedham. The cemetery was established by the town of Hyde Park in 1892, and became the responsibility of the city of Boston when it annexed that town in 1912. The cemetery was added to the National Register of Historic Places on September 16, 2009. It is the newest of Boston's cemeteries, and has more than 40,000 burials. It is the location where the City of Boston “bury indigent and unclaimed people”.

== Description ==
Fairview Cemetery is located on the west side of Hyde Park, bounded on the east by houses lining Turtle Pond Parkway, and the south by Boston's Mill Pond Reservation. The main entrance is near its southeast corner, accessed via Fairview Avenue from the junction of Turtle Pond Parkway and River Street. The core of the cemetery is dominated by a hill which provides views of the surrounding countryside, and is a significant influence on the circulation pattern. Early burials tended to be placed on the higher levels of the hill, and included large family lots with family monuments.

The town of Hyde Park was incorporated in 1868, and in 1892 authorized the purchase of the estate of William S. Damrell, a businessman and Congressman. The core of the cemetery (about 50 of its nearly 58 acres or 23 hectares) was laid out in the then-fashionable rural cemetery style, with winding lanes and a landscaped environment, by G.L. Richardson. It was the Hyde Park's first cemetery, and the last public cemetery established in what is now the city of Boston. Between its founding and 1965, it was gradually increased in size to reach its present dimensions.

== Notable interments ==
- Henry Beebee Carrington, brigadier general
- Rebecca Davis Lee Crumpler, MD., first African American female physician
- Thomas Menino, Mayor of Boston
- William Monroe Trotter (1872–1934), newspaper editor and African-American civil rights activist

The cemetery contains one British Commonwealth war grave, of a Royal Naval Reserve seaman of World War I.

== Gallery ==
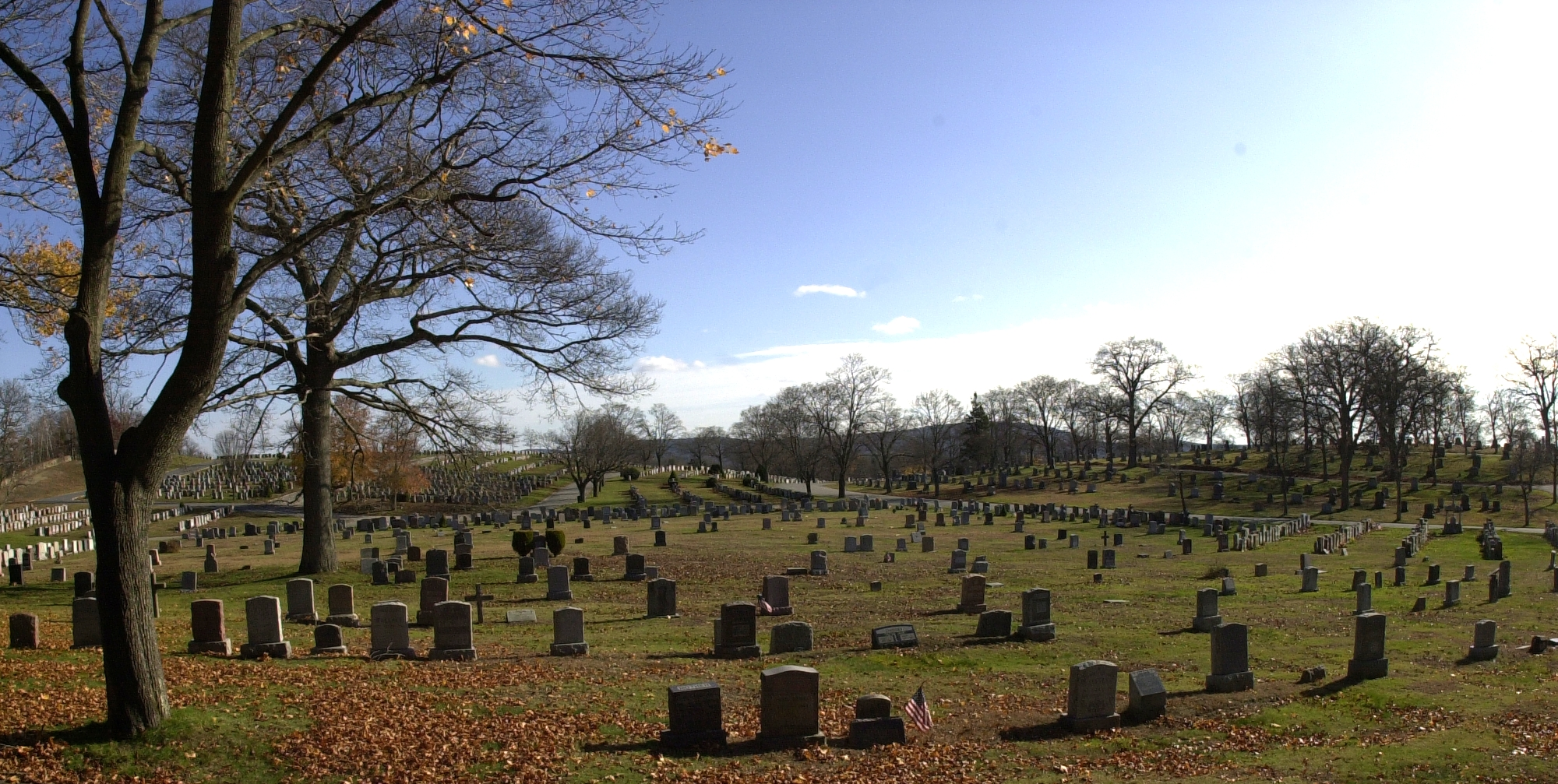

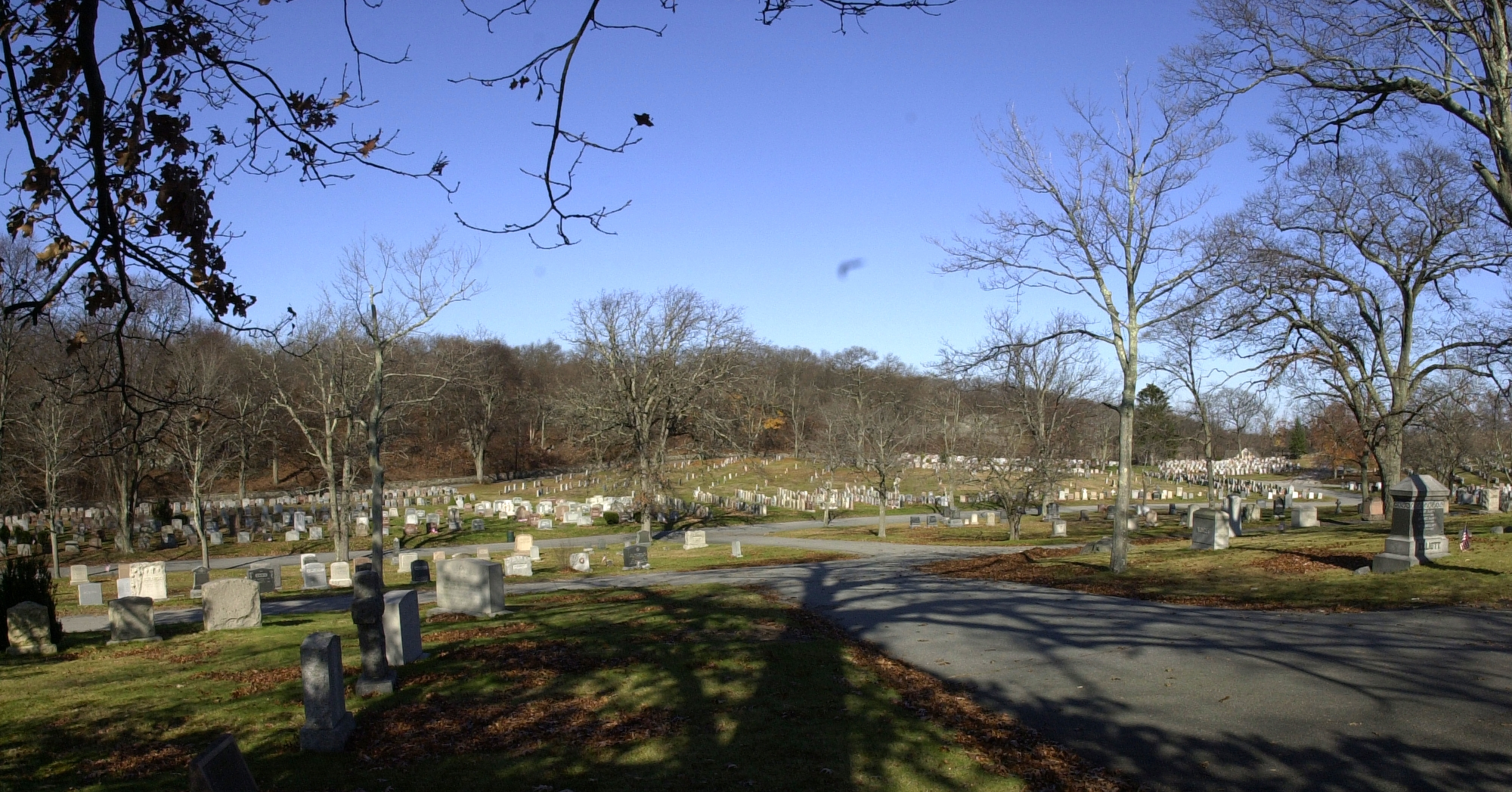

== See also ==
- National Register of Historic Places listings in southern Boston, Massachusetts
- National Register of Historic Places listings in Norfolk County, Massachusetts
