= George W. Forbes =

American journalist

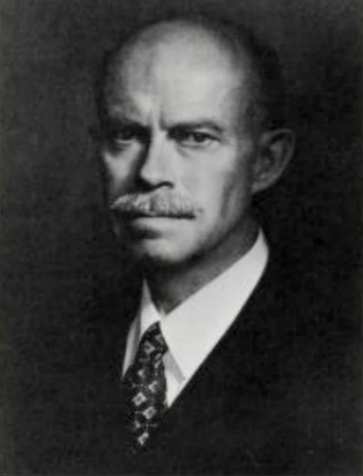

George W. Forbes (1864-1927) was an American journalist who advocated for African-American civil rights in the late 19th and early 20th centuries. He is best known for co-founding the Boston Guardian, an African-American newspaper in which he and William Monroe Trotter published editorials excoriating Booker T. Washington for his accommodationist approach to race relations. He also founded and edited the Boston Courant, one of Boston's earliest black newspapers, and edited the A. M. E. Church Review, a national publication.

Born into slavery in Mississippi, Forbes was soon emancipated. As a youth, he worked as a laborer but went North at age 14 to pursue education. He worked as a laborer at Harvard University to save money, and graduated from Amherst College in Massachusetts. Settling in Boston, he gained a national reputation as a journalist. Locally, he was well known as the reference librarian at the West End branch of the Boston Public Library, where he worked for 32 years. He was the Boston system's first black librarian.

== Early life and education ==
Forbes was born into slavery in 1864 in Shannon, Mississippi, where both his parents were held. After the Civil War and emancipation, he worked as a laborer and a farm hand.

At the age of 14, he left Mississippi for Ohio, where he studied for a time at Wilberforce University. He wanted greater opportunities.

In the mid-1880s, he moved to Boston, Massachusetts. There he worked for three or four years as a laborer at Harvard University, and saved up to continue his education. While living in Boston, he befriended W.E.B. Du Bois, who was studying at Harvard at the time. Continuing with an academic career, Du Bois became one of the most influential African-American leaders of the period.

In 1888, Forbes enrolled in Amherst College in western Massachusetts, where he made two lifelong friends: William H. Lewis, a pioneering black athlete who became an assistant U.S. attorney general, and William T. Jackson, who became an influential educator. Du Bois attended their graduation ceremony in 1892.

== Career ==
After college, Forbes returned to Boston, where he aligned himself with a group of black activists known informally as "the radicals." The group, which included his classmate Lewis as well as William Monroe Trotter, Archibald Grimké, Butler R. Wilson, Clement G. Morgan, and other black intellectuals, was critical of Booker T. Washington's accommodationist approach to race relations as president of Tuskegee Institute in Alabama.

That fall Forbes started one of Boston's earliest African-American newspapers, the Boston Courant (not to be confused with the periodical by the same name founded in 1995), a weekly paper which he owned and edited until it folded for financial reasons five years later. (Note: According to Clement G. Morgan, Forbes edited the Courant "for ten years or more with great success"; his obituary in the Crisis gives the dates as 1893 to 1903.)

In 1896 he became the Boston Public Library system's first black librarian when he was hired as an assistant librarian at the West End branch, the largest branch in Boston. At the time, the West End was a predominantly black neighborhood. Waves of Jewish immigrants from Eastern Europe began to fill up the West End tenements, and black Bostonians began moving to the South End.

As the West End became increasingly Jewish, Forbes stayed put, becoming a neighborhood institution at the West End branch. He worked there for 32 years and never took a single sick day.

In 1901, Forbes co-founded the Boston Guardian with William Monroe Trotter. According to Clement G. Morgan, Forbes provided the editorial know-how and literary ability, while Trotter provided the funding. In the first issue, published on November 9, 1901, Forbes and Trotter declared their intent to fight for equal rights: "We have come to protest forever against being proscribed or shut off in any caste from equal rights with other citizens, and shall remain forever on the firing line at any and all times in defence of such rights."

For the first two years, Forbes wrote most of the editorials. His sharp criticism of Booker T. Washington soon garnered national attention. As Du Bois wrote later in The Crisis:

The Boston Guardian was radical, intransigent and absolutely clear. It opposed Mr. Washington's doctrine of surrender and compromise and it opposed this doctrine with editorials that flamed and scorched and George Washington Forbes wrote them....Whatever has been accomplished from that day to this in beating back the forces of surrender and submission and in making the American Negro stand on both feet and demand full citizenship rights in America, has been due in no small degree to Forbes' work on the Boston Guardian.

In July 1903, Trotter and several of his friends disrupted a speech by Washington in a Boston church,. In the ensuing melee Trotter was arrested. The incident, which later became known as the "Boston riot," seems to have been a turning point for Forbes. Soon afterward, he left the Guardian, transferring his shares to William H. Lewis.

Forbes played a small role in the founding of the Niagara Movement, the precursor to the National Association for the Advancement of Colored People (NAACP), but from about 1910 he retired from politics and focused on his work at the library. He continued to write, contributing articles on black history and race relations to the Springfield Republican and the Boston Transcript, and reviewing books for The Crisis (the official magazine of the NAACP). He also edited the A. M. E. Church Review, the quarterly journal of the African Methodist Episcopal Church.

== Death and legacy ==
Forbes died of pneumonia on March 10, 1927, at his home at 18 Wellington Street in the South End. He was 63.

After his death, the Boston Globe called him "one of the leading colored men of this city" and lauded his commitment to higher education, noting that he had encouraged many young black men to go to college. What the Globe did not mention was that as a librarian in Boston's heavily Jewish West End, Forbes had influenced the lives of countless young Jews. A warm tribute to Forbes, originally printed in Yiddish, appeared in The Jewish Daily Forward and was reprinted in English in the Crisis and Opportunity: A Journal of Negro Life. The article hailed Forbes as a "friend of the race," praising not only his intellect but his unfailing kindness:

Many times a college or high school student wrestled with a certain subject. To whom should he go? Of course to Mr. Forbes, and Mr. Forbes gave him advice, assisted and encouraged him, so that the student who came into the Library with a troubled heart and in despair, went out realizing and seeing a way to overcome the difficulty...Though his death is being mourned by the Negro population which was justly proud of him, still more is he being mourned by the Jewish children of the West End of Boston.

The West End branch of the Boston Public Library closed on the afternoon of his funeral so that his library colleagues could serve as pallbearers. He left an unpublished manuscript, titled History of the Black Men in the Life of the Republic.
