= Clement G. Morgan =

American lawyer

Clement Garnett Morgan
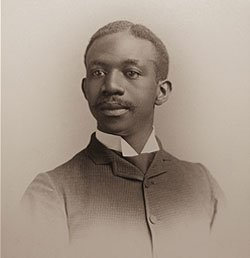
- Clement G. Morgan, 1890

Member of the Cambridge Board of Aldermen (Note: From 1895–97, the same body was known as the Cambridge Common Council.)
- In office 1895–1899

Personal details
- Born: January 9, 1859 Stafford County, Virginia, U.S.
- Died: June 1, 1929 (aged 70) Brookline, Massachusetts, U.S.
- Party: Republican
- Spouse: Gertrude Wright Morgan
- Education: Boston Latin School; Harvard University; Harvard University School of Law

Clement Garnett Morgan (1859-1929) was an African-American attorney, civil rights activist, and city official of Cambridge, Massachusetts. Born into slavery in Virginia and freed by the Emancipation Proclamation, he trained as a barber before moving to Massachusetts to pursue his education. He was the first African American to earn degrees from both Harvard University and its law school; the first African American to deliver Harvard's senior class oration; and the first black alderman in New England. As an attorney he handled many civil rights cases, in one instance closing down a segregated school. He was a founding member of the Niagara Movement and of the Boston branch of the National Association for the Advancement of Colored People.

== Early life and education ==
Clement Garnett Morgan was born into slavery on January 9, 1859, in Stafford County, Virginia. When he and his parents were freed by the Emancipation Proclamation in 1863, they moved to Washington, D.C., where Clement attended the M Street High School and trained as a barber. After finishing high school he moved to St. Louis, Missouri, where he taught for four years in an all-black school.

Determined to acquire the best possible education, Morgan moved to Boston and attended the Boston Latin School for two years in preparation for college. While there he earned a Franklin Medal and won Lawrence Prizes for declamation and reading. In his senior year he held the post of adjutant of the school's battalion. He graduated with high honors in 1886. He was 27 when he enrolled at Harvard University a few months later.

While at Harvard, Morgan covered his expenses by working in a barber shop on Shawmut Avenue and by winning several scholarships. During his senior year he won the Boylston Prize for oratory; his classmate, the noted intellectual and activist W. E. B. Du Bois, came in second. Morgan received his B.A. in 1890, and his LL.B. from Harvard University Law School in 1893. He was the first African American to earn both of those degrees at Harvard. The following year, Du Bois became the first African American to earn both a B.A. and a Ph.D. from Harvard.

=== Harvard "class day" oration ===
Each year, Harvard seniors elected a classmate to deliver a speech on "class day", the week before graduation, while the faculty selected six students to speak at the graduation ceremony. In October 1889, the senior class elected Morgan to give the class day oration. Morgan's selection was unprecedented: not only was he Harvard's first African-American class day speaker, he was also the first working-class student to receive an honor normally reserved for those from elite Boston Brahmin families.

The election made national headlines; most were congratulatory, although several Southern newspapers published mocking editorials. Harvard officials made a point of avoiding publicity, not wishing to suggest that his selection was based on anything other than merit, and Morgan himself refused to speak to the press. An 1889 Boston Globe article describes Morgan as "a dignified young man, with the manners of a Chesterfield. He is 5 feet 6 inches in height, broad shouldered and quite dark in color, with a wide forehead and brilliant eyes." Colonel Thomas Wentworth Higginson, who knew Morgan, spoke highly of him and added, "I do not recall a single case in which a young man has shown greater endurance in struggling against all kinds of opposition."

A rigorous procedure was used to select the six commencement speakers. To qualify for the competition, students first had to achieve a high grade point average. They then wrote essays and gave oral presentations which were graded by a seven-member faculty committee. Of the 44 presentations, Du Bois's received by far the highest score. Morgan's also ranked among the top six. Some committee members, however, objected to having two African-American students speak at graduation. After a heated debate, the committee voted to replace Morgan with a white student. One of the members, James B. Thayer, resigned from the committee in protest, writing later, "We had a wonderful opportunity...and it was a bitter thing to see it lost by the vote of one who thought the man [Morgan] deserved the place, but excluded him because of his color, or...on account of the other man's color."

== Career ==
Soon after graduating from law school, Morgan was admitted to the Suffolk bar. He opened a law practice at 39 Court Street in Boston.

=== Civil rights work ===
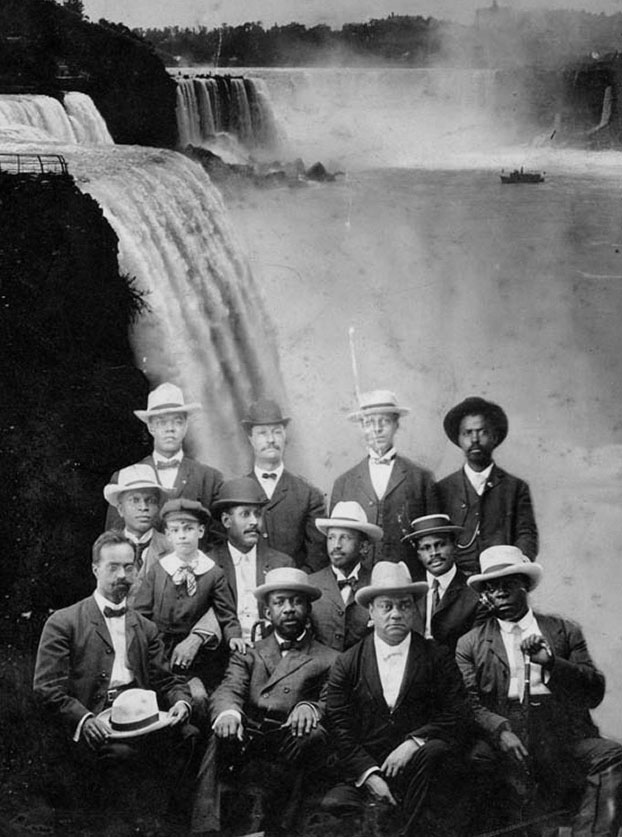
Niagara movement meeting in Fort Erie, Canada, 1905. Morgan is second from the left in the front row.

While still a student, Morgan showed an interest in civil rights activism. On July 8, 1890, he made a stirring speech on "Race Unity" at the Charles Street A. M. E. Church in Boston, before a large gathering of the Colored National League. The other speakers were Mark R. DeMortie, Carrie Washington, and the abolitionist John J. Smith. In Morgan's speech, he stressed the importance of education, asserting that African Americans "should be given every chance of cultivating heart and head" and urging listeners to save their money and send their sons to college. He also declared his pride in his ancestry in no uncertain terms:

I am glad to be a negro and I mean it from the bottom of my heart.

I mean to be a negro.

On the bottom of my heart is written negro...If any of you are ashamed of your blood it is cowardice.

As an attorney, Morgan handled many civil rights cases. In 1902, with his good friend Butler R. Wilson, Morgan tried to fight the extradition of a black factory worker named Monroe Rogers to North Carolina, arguing that he was likely to be lynched there. Reportedly, Rogers had turned off the main water valve of a house at the request of his girlfriend, who worked there as a domestic; for this, he was accused of attempting to burn down the house, and charged with the capital crime of arson. The case inspired angry protests in Boston, where it was widely believed that a black defendant could not get a fair trial in the South. The following year, Morgan successfully represented black parents in Sheffield, Massachusetts, who refused to send their children to the Plain School, a segregated school for the town's 33 black children. The school was subsequently shut down.

Morgan was one of the original 29 members of the Niagara Movement, a civil rights organization founded by Du Bois in 1905. Du Bois chose him to represent the Massachusetts chapter. Along with Butler R. Wilson, William Monroe Trotter and others, Morgan was critical of Booker T. Washington's accommodationist approach. Morgan was later active in the Boston branch of the National Association for the Advancement of Colored People (NAACP), which was presided over by Wilson.

Morgan and Wilson worked together again in 1915 when, with Trotter and other activists, they led a spirited but unsuccessful effort to ban The Birth of a Nation from Boston theaters. The film, which vilified African Americans and glorified the Ku Klux Klan (KKK), was the focus of many protests in Boston. At one rally, Morgan demanded the recall of Mayor James Michael Curley, who refused to ban the film. In the 1920s, New England experienced an increase in anti-Catholic KKK activity; by allying with the Catholic Church, Trotter was able to get the film banned in 1921.

=== City of Cambridge ===
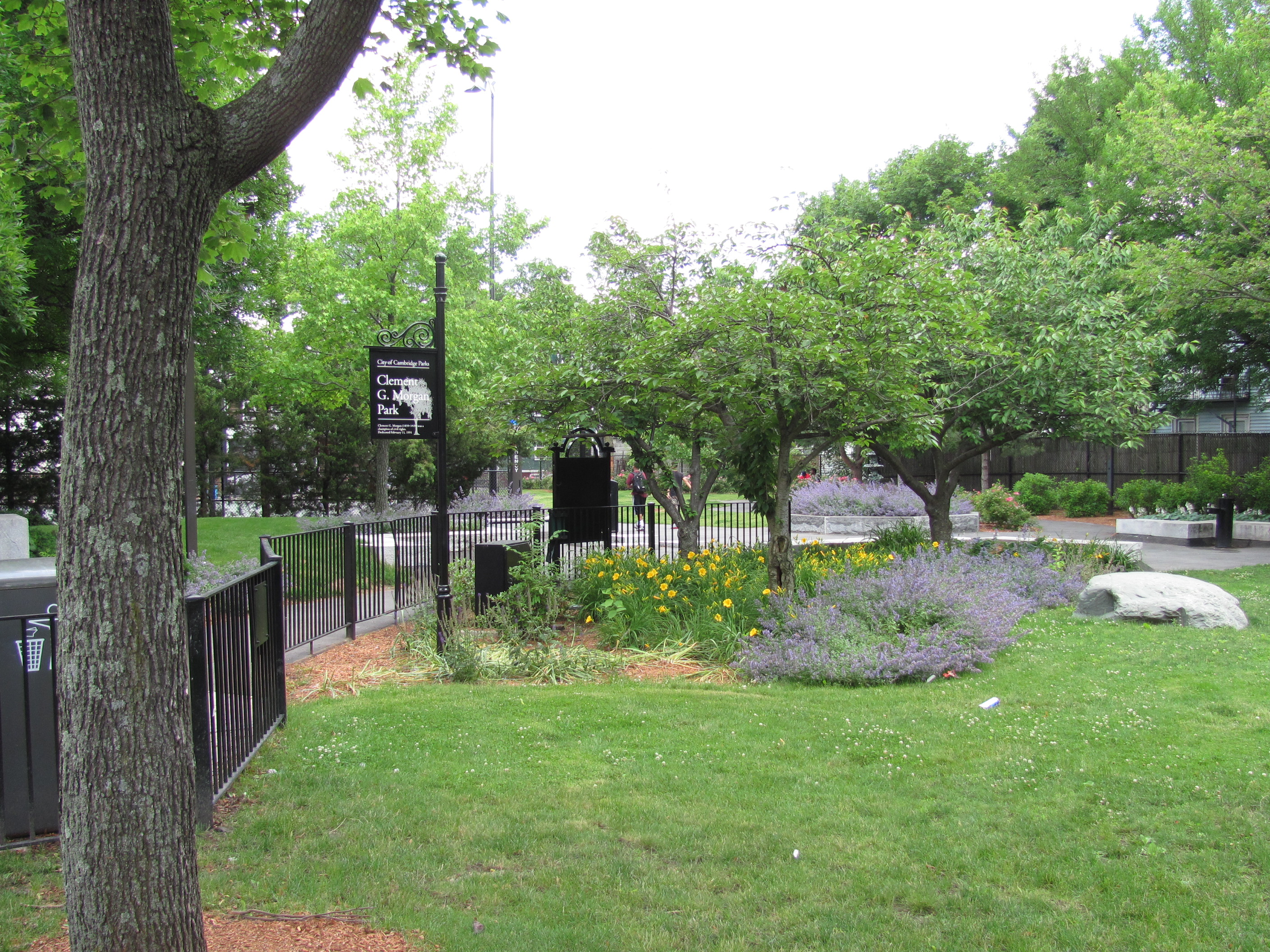
Clement G. Morgan Park, Cambridge, Massachusetts

Morgan was active in Republican Party politics. In December 1894 he was elected to the Cambridge Common Council from the predominantly white Ward 2, and served two one-year terms. In 1896, he became the first African American to be elected to the Cambridge Board of Aldermen, and the first black alderman in New England. Following his inauguration, city business and political leaders held a banquet in his honor at the Odd Fellows Hall in Cambridgeport. He served on the board in 1897 and 1898. He later ran unsuccessfully for the state legislature.

== Personal life ==
Morgan lived on Columbia Street in Cambridge until 1897. That year he married Gertrude Wright in Springfield, Illinois, and moved to 265 Prospect Street in the neighborhood of Inman Square. No children are mentioned in his obituary.

The Morgans belonged to several of the city's exclusive social clubs, including the Omar Khayyam Circle, a black literary and intellectual group which met at the Cambridge home of Maria Baldwin.

== Death and legacy ==
Morgan died on June 1, 1929, at the Corey Hill Hospital in Brookline, Massachusetts. He is buried at Mount Auburn Cemetery in Cambridge though a grave marker was only dedicated in September 2005. Clement G. Morgan Park in the Port/Area 4 neighborhood of Cambridge was dedicated to him on February 11, 1991. He is memorialized at the site with a plaque and a mural
