= William Monroe Trotter =

American newspaper editor, businessman, and civil rights activist

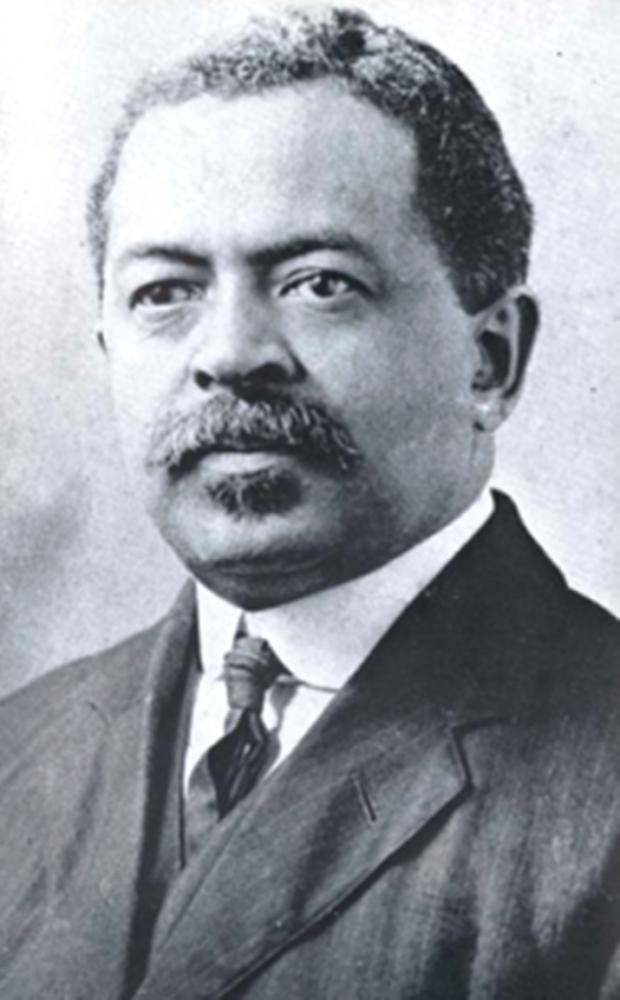
- 1915 photograph
- Born: William Monroe Trotter; April 7, 1872 near Chillicothe, Ohio, U.S.
- Died: April 7, 1934 (aged 62); Boston, Massachusetts, U.S.
- Education: Harvard University
- Occupations: Newspaper editor and real estate businessman
- Spouse: Geraldine "Deenie" Pindell
- Scientific career
- Fields: Civil rights, real estate
- Workplaces: Boston Guardian

William Monroe Trotter, sometimes just Monroe Trotter (April 7, 1872 – April 7, 1934), was an American newspaper editor and real estate businessman based in Boston, Massachusetts. An activist for African-American civil rights, he was an early opponent of the accommodationist race policies of Booker T. Washington, and in 1901 founded the Boston Guardian, an independent African-American newspaper he used to express that opposition. Active in protest movements for civil rights throughout the 1900s and 1910s, he also revealed some of the differences within the African-American community. He contributed to the formation of the National Association for the Advancement of Colored People (NAACP).

Trotter was born into a well-to-do family and raised in Hyde Park, Massachusetts. J. M. Trotter, a Recorder of Deeds, and Virginia Trotter were his parents. He earned his graduate and post-graduate degrees at Harvard University, and was the first man of color to earn a Phi Beta Kappa key there. Seeing an increase in segregation in northern facilities, he began to engage in a life of activism, to which he devoted his assets. He joined with W. E. B. Du Bois in founding the Niagara Movement in 1905, a forerunner of the NAACP. Trotter's style was often divisive, and he ended up leaving that organization for the National Equal Rights League. His protest activities were sometimes seen to be at cross purposes to those of the NAACP.

In 1914, he had a highly publicized meeting with President Woodrow Wilson, in which he protested Wilson's introduction of segregation into the federal workplace. In Boston, Trotter succeeded in shutting down productions of The Clansman in 1910, but he was unsuccessful in 1915 with screenings of the movie The Birth of a Nation, which also portrayed the Ku Klux Klan in favorable terms. He was not able to influence the peace talks at the end of World War I, and was in later years a marginalized voice of protest. In 1921, in an alliance with Roman Catholics, he got a revival screening of The Birth of a Nation banned. He died on his 62nd birthday after a possibly suicidal fall from his Boston home.

== Early life and education ==
William was the third child, and first to survive infancy, of James Monroe Trotter and Virginia (Isaacs) Trotter. His father James was born into slavery in Mississippi; James' mother Letitia was enslaved, and his father was her white master Richard S. Trotter. Letitia, her son and two daughters were freed by their master after his marriage and sent to Cincinnati, Ohio, which had a thriving free black community. After working as a teacher, James Trotter enlisted in the United States Colored Troops during the American Civil War, and was the first man of color to be promoted to lieutenant in the 55th Regiment of the Massachusetts Volunteer Infantry (Colored).

Virginia Isaacs, also of mixed race, was born free in 1842 in either Ohio or Virginia. Her mother Ann-Elizabeth Fossett was born into slavery at Monticello, where she was a daughter of Joseph Fossett and Edith Hern Fossett, and great granddaughter of Elizabeth Hemings. Virginia's father Tucker Isaacs was a free person of color. He purchased the freedom of Ann-Elizabeth Fossett, Virginia's mother. The family moved to Chillicothe in the free state of Ohio, where Virginia grew up in its thriving black community. There she met and married James Trotter.

Shortly after the Civil War, the Trotters moved from Ohio to settle in Boston, Massachusetts. After their first two children died in infancy, they returned to the Isaacs farm of Virginia's parents, where their son William Monroe Trotter was born on April 7, 1872. When he was seven months old, the family moved back to Boston, where they settled in the South End, far from the predominantly African-American west side of Beacon Hill. The family later moved to suburban Hyde Park, a white neighborhood. The Trotters had two more children, both daughters.

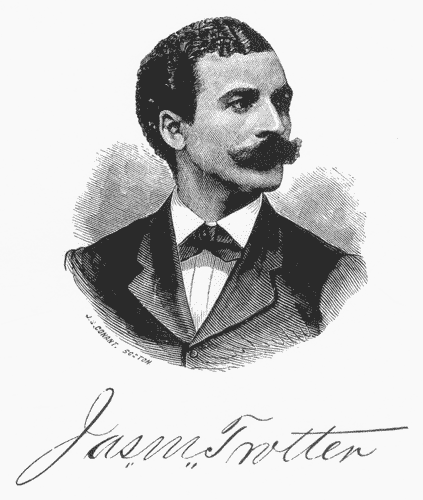
Trotter's father James, 1881 engraving

Trotter's father broke through many racial obstacles placed before him, but was often frustrated in his attempts to gain equal treatment or fair consideration. While serving in the Union Army, he protested the inequality of pay between blacks and whites. In Boston he was the first man of color to be employed by the Post Office Department (now the U.S. Postal Service), a job he left after he was repeatedly passed over for promotion because of discriminatory Republican-led federal government policy. Politically active, the elder Trotter was a leading African-American Democrat in New England. He supported Grover Cleveland for President, and was rewarded in 1886 when Cleveland appointed him Recorder of Deeds for the District of Columbia, the highest federal position filled by black men at the time. Two other prominent men of color of that era, Frederick Douglass and Senator Blanche Kelso Bruce, also held the post. The job was a lucrative one, and the Trotter family prospered.

The young Trotter (who was usually called by his middle name "Monroe") grew up in this environment, and was introduced to Archibald Grimké, another politically active African American who also lived in Hyde Park. He excelled in school, graduating from the otherwise all-white Hyde Park High School as valedictorian and president of his high school class. He went on to Harvard University, where he continued to distinguish himself academically. He was awarded merit scholarships after his father died, and was the first man of color to be awarded a Phi Beta Kappa key at Harvard. He earned a bachelor's degree magna cum laude in 1895 and a Masters in 1896, working a variety of odd jobs to help pay his tuition.

During his years at Harvard, he adopted a number of habits which he maintained for much of his life. He organized and led the Total Abstinence League, a temperance organization; he was a teetotaler and never drank alcohol. He was active in the Baptist church, in which he had considered becoming a minister.

== Marriage and family ==
Following his graduation, Trotter participated in the upper echelons of Negro society in Boston, a number of whose members had ancestors free before the Civil War. He belonged to an exclusive literary society that met at the home of Cambridge educator Maria Baldwin. On June 27, 1899, Trotter married Geraldine Louise ("Deenie") Pindell (October 3, 1872 – October 8, 1918), who was from another activist family. He had known her since childhood. She assisted him throughout his career until her death in the 1918 flu pandemic. The couple had no children.

== Early career ==
Trotter's career began inauspiciously. His initial attempts to get jobs at established banking and real estate firms were unsuccessful, leading him through a succession of lower-paying clerking jobs. He finally landed a job in a white-owned real estate firm in 1898, but decided the next year to open his own business selling insurance and brokering mortgages. He was not particularly active in agitating for civil rights in these years, although his strong opinions on racial equality were evident in an 1899 paper in which he called on African Americans to seek admission to institutions of higher learning. (It was a common practice of the time to direct African Americans away from higher education opportunities and into industrial training programs.) Trotter's business was relatively successful, and he was able to purchase investment properties.

Trotter was increasingly troubled by what he saw as the accommodationist policies of Booker T. Washington, one of the leading African-American figures of the 1890s and founder of the Tuskegee Institute. Washington's policies were enshrined in the Atlanta Compromise, outlined in an 1895 speech he gave in Atlanta, Georgia. He said that Southern African Americans should not agitate for political rights (such as the right to vote and equal treatment under the law) as long as they were provided economic opportunities and basic rights of due process. Washington actively promoted the idea that African Americans, once they had proven themselves as productive members of society, would be granted full political rights. Trotter, Grimké, W. E. B. Du Bois, and other northern radicals disagreed with these ideas, arguing that it was necessary for African Americans to agitate for equal treatment and full constitutional rights, because doing so would bring other benefits. By the turn of the century, African Americans in the South had been effectively disfranchised by violence around elections, and restrictions in voting registration rules, and, finally, constitutional amendments or new constitutions in Southern states.

Although Boston was comparatively congenial when compared to other parts of the country, Trotter and others felt that Washington's stance was leading to an increase in more typically Southern racist attitudes in the city. "The conviction grew upon me", he wrote, that his business successes could be endangered "if race prejudice and persecution and public discrimination from mere color was to spread up from the South and result in a fixed caste of color".

== The Guardian ==
My vocation has been to wage a crusade against lynching, disenfranchisement, peonage, public segregation, injustice, denial of service in public places for color, in war time and peace.

— William Monroe Trotter

Trotter's racial activism blossomed in 1901. He helped found the Boston Literary and Historical Association, which became, according to biographer Stephen Fox, "a forum for militant race opinion". He also joined the Massachusetts Racial Protective Association, another local group that promoted political goals of equality. Under the aegis of the latter group, Trotter in October 1901 gave his first major protest speech, attacking Booker T. Washington's accommodationist stance: "In Boston [Washington] said that the Negro should wait for the franchise until he had got property, education and character. Washington's attitude has ever been one of servility."

With George W. Forbes, another Protective Association member, in 1901 Trotter co-founded the Guardian, a weekly newspaper. At first Forbes, an Amherst College graduate with some experience in publishing, was the driving operational force in its production, while Trotter funded the effort and served as its managing editor. The paper became a forum for a more outspoken and forceful approach to gaining racial equality, and its contributors and editorials (which were generally written by Trotter) regularly attacked Washington. The paper's editorial stance brought a stream of criticism from more mainstream African-American publications: the New York Age, calling it "putrescent", wrote that "Editor Trotter ... makes himself smelt if not felt"; another wrote that the Guardian was "carrying its cases too fast and too far", and that Trotter suffered from a "mental malady". The Guardian had limited circulation, but was highly influential as one of only 200 African-American publications in the country. It suffered financially due to Trotter's poor accounting and inattention due to his heavy schedule. Forbes, who principally worked as a librarian in the city library, left the business in 1904 because of Booker T. Washington's legal assaults on the newspaper and pressure by Washington supporters on his employers. Trotter's wife, and later his sister, assisted in the paper's publication.

The Guardian was bitter, satirical, and personal; but it was earnest, and it published facts. It attracted wide attention among colored people; it circulated among them all over the country; it was quoted and discussed. I did not wholly agree with the Guardian, and indeed only a few Negroes did, but nearly all read it and were influenced by it.

— W. E. B. Du Bois

Trotter, in a deliberate move, transferred the Guardian's offices in 1907 to the same building that had once housed William Lloyd Garrison's Liberator. Trotter idolized Garrison, a leading abolitionist agitator before the Civil War, and had studied his methods. He was a regular correspondent with Garrison's sons William Jr. and Francis Garrison.

The Guardian was always unprofitable, a condition that was exacerbated by Trotter's refusal to take advertising for alcohol and tobacco. He sold off all of his Boston-area properties by 1910 to raise funds for the newspaper, and he was lax in collecting payments from his subscribers. In his later years, the quality of the publication noticeably declined, and its operations were propped up by a local community group's fund-raising activities.

== Attacking the African-American establishment ==
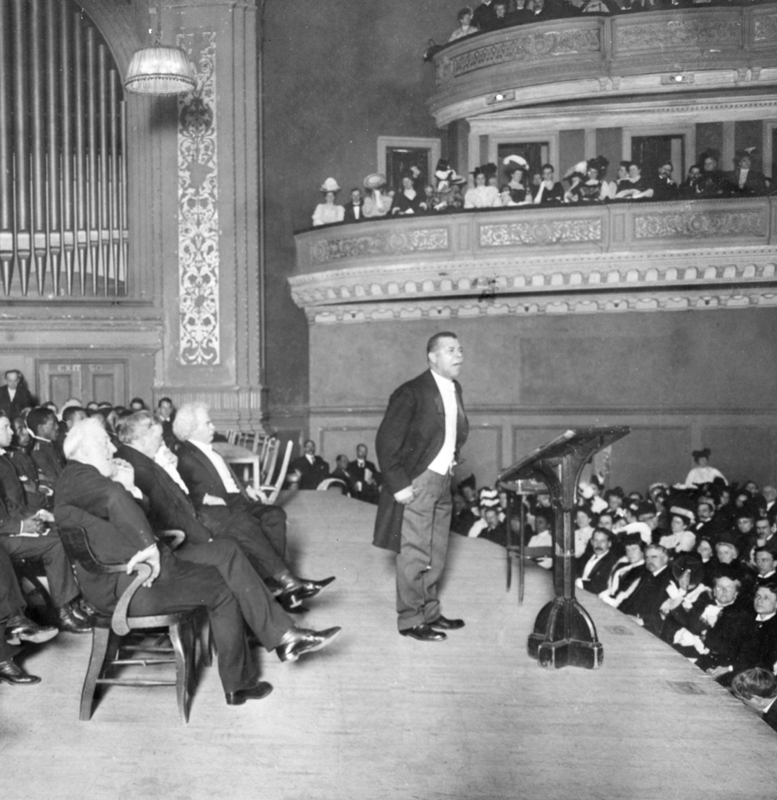
Booker T. Washington giving a speech at Carnegie Hall in New York City, 1909

In the early 1900s, Trotter noticed that racial segregation was spreading in Boston: the number of hotels, restaurants, and other public establishments refusing service to African Americans was increasing. He came to realize that, in order to effect real change, the radical message needed to be taken out of Boston, and began organizing protest meetings across New England in 1903. At the suggestion of Trotter, William H. Ferris went to Washington D.C. in January 1903. Ferris gave a presentation critical to Booker T. Washington in front of the Bethel Literary and Historical Society on January 6, 1903. Richard W. Thompson spoke in support of Washington as replies at the Second Baptist Lyceum on January 25 and Jesse Lawson did the same on February 3. In 1999, Jacqueline M. Moore argued that Thompson's paper failed to hold his ground against Ferris, who was present at the talk.

His long-term objective was to effect policy changes in the National Afro-American Council, then the only national-level organization of African Americans. At the group's annual meeting in Louisville, Kentucky, Trotter and others introduced resolutions calling for more activism, but Booker T. Washington supporters (also known as "Bookerites"), who controlled the council, saw to their defeat. One commentator wrote that the "Boston idiots" had been treated "in delightful fashion". The Guardian described the convention as "dominated to death by one man". The activities of the radicals at the convention did bring them some national press. Trotter continued to criticize Washington in the Guardian; his attacks were particularly harsh and personal, and brought a bitter tinge to the disagreement.

In this period, while the Great Migration of African Americans out of the South to the North was beginning, blacks in the two regions dealt with different conditions. The vast majority of the millions of African Americans still lived in the South, many in rural areas where they were the majority population. But they were effectively disfranchised by new electoral rules and state constitutions, utterly closed out of the political process. This situation would continue, despite some temporarily effective court challenges, through the 1960s. Washington believed he had to help this population within the constraints of their environment. At the same time, he secretly funded legal challenges against the voter registration and electoral restrictions. Trotter and other radicals tended to come from the North, where African Americans exercised more rights in daily life, including the suffrage, were more urbanized, and had achieved more in work and education, but were still subject to discrimination.

Following their failure to advance the radical agenda in Louisville, Trotter and the other radicals sought a more sympathetic forum in which to attack Booker T. Washington. An opportunity arrived when Washington was set to speak in Boston in July 1903. When the Tuskegee Institute leader was introduced to a visibly hostile crowd, a small riot broke out. Trotter, who had arrived prepared with several provocative questions to ask Washington, attempted to read them over the din of the melee. He was among the arrested, and the "Boston riot" received national press coverage. Trotter later claimed that there was no plan to break up the meeting. Bookerites pressed charges against Trotter for disrupting the meeting; defended by Archibald Grimké, Trotter was convicted and spent thirty days in the Charles Street Jail. Although the Bookerites had hoped to discredit the radicals with the trial, they gained them wider publicity. After the trial, Trotter founded the Boston Suffrage League (1903), and when a New England Suffrage League was founded in 1904, Trotter was elected president.

Washington countered Trotter's attacks with a variety of tactics. He took various legal actions against Trotter, including at least one libel suit and criminal charges. In addition, he used his network to apply pressure to Trotter's supporters in their workplaces (in some cases government and academic positions). In addition, he had other sympathizers secretly infiltrate and report on activist meetings organized by Trotter and others. Washington also provided financial support and expertise to start other publications in Boston to counter Trotter's radical voice. As a result of such activities, Trotter's printer dropped the activist and his newspaper as a client. But Trotter found another printer and continued publishing the Guardian despite the setback.

== Niagara Movement and the NAACP ==
In the early months of 1905, Booker T. Washington sought to create an umbrella organization to represent all the major African-American leaders of the day. Du Bois and Grimké were the two most radical leaders invited to its early organizational meetings, but both eventually refused to ally with Washington, whom they saw as dominating the group. Du Bois, Trotter, and two others organized a meeting of radicals from across the nation in western New York. Meeting in July just across the Canada–US border in Fort Erie, Ontario they founded the Niagara Movement. Organized so that no one man could dominate it, the group espoused a radical declaration of principles (authored by Trotter and Du Bois), calling for agitation for equal economic opportunity and exercise of full civil rights for African Americans. The organization was soon divided internally by political and personal disagreements, and Washington worked from outside against its growth.

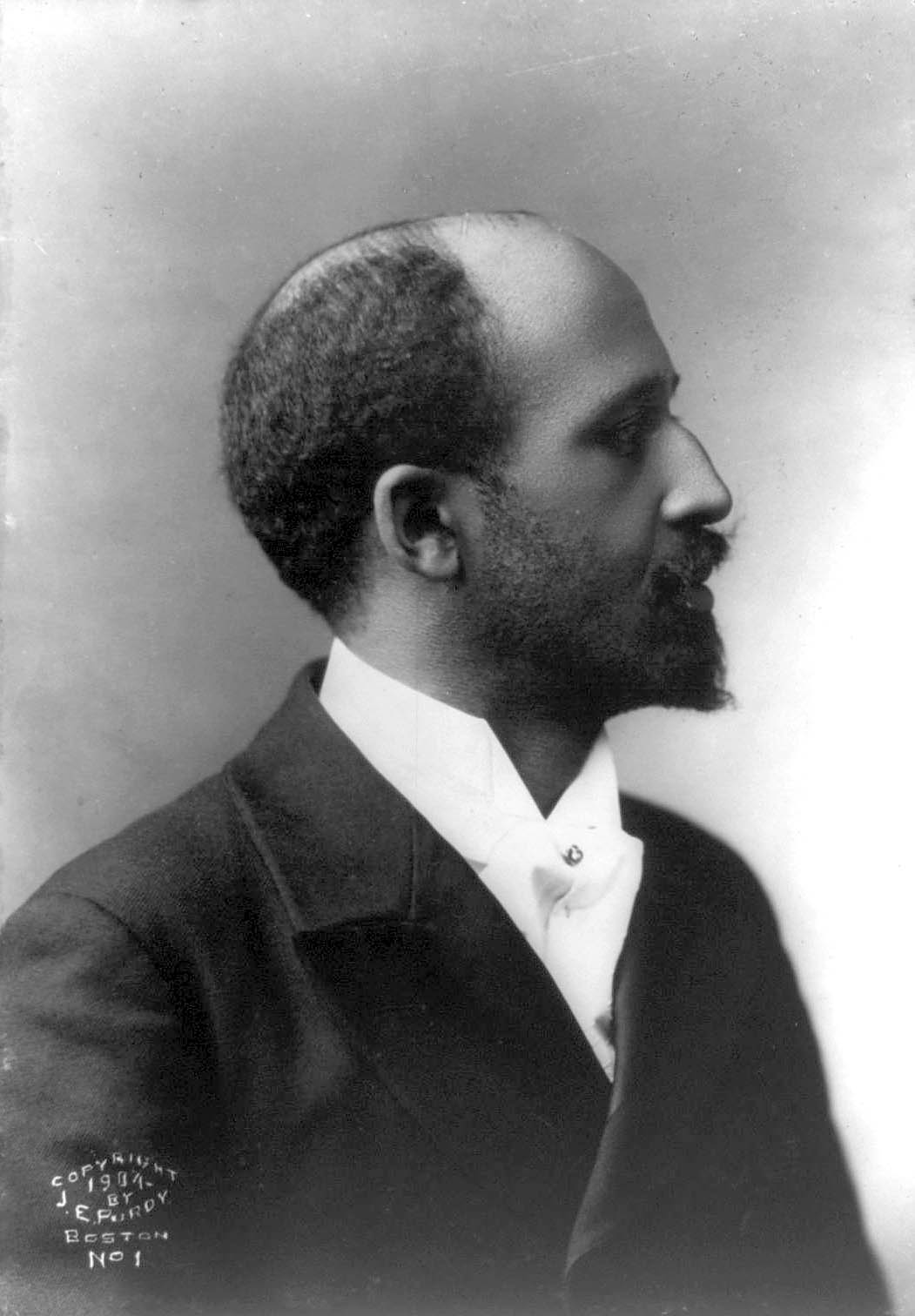
W. E. B. Du Bois, 1904 photo

During the early months of 1906, friction began to develop between Du Bois and Trotter over the admission of women to the organization. Du Bois supported the idea, and Trotter opposed it, but eventually relented. The matter was smoothed over during the 1906 meeting. Their division became more significant when Trotter split with Clement Morgan, a longtime supporter and Movement member, over Massachusetts politics and control of the local Movement chapter. Du Bois sided with Morgan and, when the Movement met in Boston in 1907, he reappointed Morgan to a leading position in the organization. Attempts to heal the rift failed, and Trotter resigned from the Movement. Because of these difficulties, the organization had effectively collapsed by 1908. The break between Trotter and Du Bois was permanent, and they never worked directly together again. Du Bois wrote in 1909 that it was "utterly impossible to work with Mr. Trotter."

Despite the Niagara Movement's failure, its goals had appealed to white supporters of racial equality. They participated in the founding of the National Association for the Advancement of Colored People (NAACP), which drew an inter-racial coalition of support. Trotter and Du Bois were both present at meetings in 1909 in which its foundation was laid. Although some of Trotter's proposals were accepted (to address segregated transportation as a grievance), others were not (such as his proposal for a bill to make lynching a federal crime). Trotter was not invited to be on the organization's executive committee; neither was Booker T. Washington, who boycotted the effort.

Trotter never played a significant role in the NAACP, and in its early years actively competed with it. In 1911 Trotter's group and the NAACP both held rallies in Boston to mark the centennial of abolitionist Charles Sumner's birth. Trotter was peripherally involved with the NAACP for a few years, but he did not approve of the amount of white involvement in the interracial group. His feud with Du Bois ran deep, so he rarely contributed to the organization at the national level. He was also troubled by the attitudes expressed in the Boston chapter, which he told NAACP leader Joel Spingarn needed more "radical, courageous activity." He eventually drifted away from the NAACP.

== National Independent Political League ==
After Trotter split from the Niagara Movement, he helped organize a conference of like-minded activists held in Philadelphia in April 1908, and served as the conference chair. In this capacity, he excluded any attendees whose racial ideology he opposed, as well as those who supported Republican William Howard Taft in the upcoming presidential election. (Trotter opposed Taft because he had tired of what he considered the Republican Party laissez-faire policies on race.) This conference led to the formation of the Negro American Political League, which eventually became known as the National Independent Political League (NIPL) and National Equal Rights League (NERL). Trotter described this group as "of the colored people and for the colored people and led by the colored people."

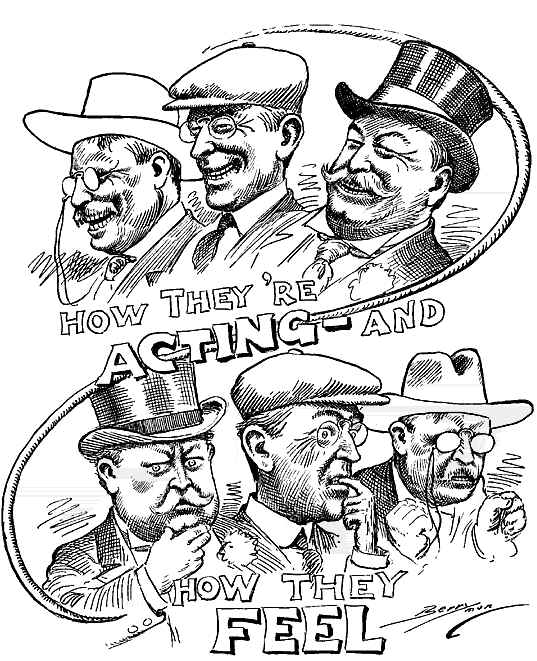
Political cartoon about the 1912 presidential election, depicting Theodore Roosevelt (cowboy hat), Woodrow Wilson (cap), and William Howard Taft (top hat)

NIPL, which biographer Fox describes as Trotter's "personal fief", was unable to attract high-profile membership as the NAACP did. Trotter did not want white members, and was unable to work effectively with other African-American leaders. NIPL and the NAACP, while both working toward similar goals, regularly feuded over matters public and personal.

As the NAACP attracted more money and talent, and became the center of anti-Bookerite civil rights activity, Trotter and the NIPL became increasingly marginalized on the left. Trotter would not have as prominent a role in the civil rights dialogue again. By 1921 the league had been reduced to a handful of Trotter supporters.

== Trotter and Woodrow Wilson ==
Trotter's opposition to Booker T. Washington placed him at odds with Theodore Roosevelt and William Howard Taft, Republican presidents who relied on Washington as an adviser and otherwise enjoyed widespread African-American support. Trotter supported the Southern Democrat Woodrow Wilson in the 1912 election. Wilson, in a brief meeting with Trotter and other NERL members, made vague statements about fair treatment of African Americans. But, he agreed to segregate federal offices. The NAACP and NERL (then known as the National Independent Political League, or NIPL) protested, and Trotter secured a meeting with Wilson at the White House in November 1913. Wilson said that his policies were not segregationist, but Trotter characterized Wilson's denial as "preposterous".

Trotter continued his protests, eventually gaining a second invitation to the White House in November 1914. This meeting with Wilson ended with a heated exchange between the two men. Wilson claimed to be dealing with a "human problem" from which politics should be left out, and suggested to Trotter's group that they could always vote for someone else in the next election. Trotter continued to argue that the segregationist policy was humiliating to African Americans. Wilson responded, "If you take it as a humiliation, which it is not intended as, and sow the seed of that impression all over the country, why the consequences will be very serious." After Trotter said this was an insult, Wilson angrily ordered him to leave, saying "If this organization wishes to approach me again, it must choose another spokesman ... your tone, sir, offends me."

Trotter's second meeting with the President was widely covered in the press, featured on the front page of The New York Times and other leading newspapers. A white Texas newspaper described Trotter as "merely a nigger" and "not a Booker T. Washington type of colored man", and Northern papers also criticized him for his "insolence" to the president. The Boston Evening Transcript, while observing that Wilson's policy was segregationist and divisive, pointed out that although Trotter was basically correct, he "offends many of his own color by his ... untactful belligerency". African Americans were divided in their response to the incident: some claimed that he did not represent them, while others, notably Du Bois, grudgingly admired Trotter's audacity. Du Bois wrote that Wilson was "insulting & condescending" in the meeting. Trotter parlayed the publicity into a series of speaking engagements, in which he denied "that in language, manner, tone, in any respect or to the slightest degree I was impudent, insolent, or insulting to the President."

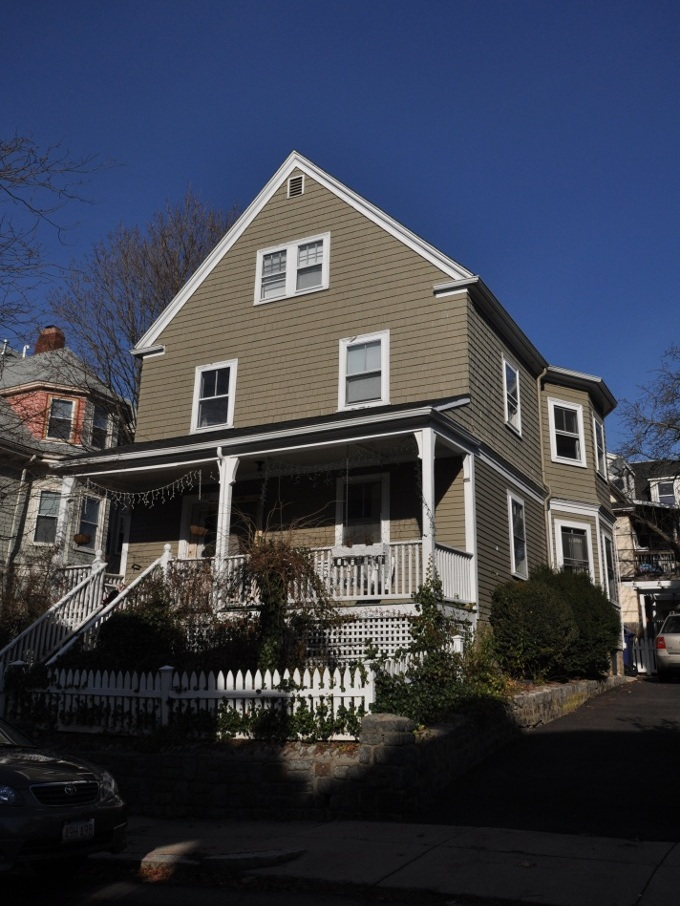
The William Monroe Trotter House in Dorchester

Trotter continued to protest segregationist policies of the Wilson administration. When the country began large-scale recruiting for the military in World War I, Trotter opposed the establishment of segregated officer training facilities. Through his influence, recruitment of blacks in the Boston area was lower than expected. During World War II, the military integrated the officer corps, and President Harry Truman afterward completed integration of the armed services.

When the Great War ended, Trotter sought to use the 1919 Paris Peace Conference as a vehicle to raise international awareness of US government policy toward African Americans. He viewed the reality of segregation as incompatible with Wilson's war vision to "make the world safe for Democracy." Trotter organized a meeting in Washington, DC related to the peace conference; he and ten other African-American delegates were chosen to attend the peace conference. The State Department refused to issue passports to those delegates, or to African Americans planning to attend a Pan-African Congress that Du Bois was organizing to be held concurrently with the peace conference in Paris. Du Bois and other African Americans were supporting African colonies' desire for independence.

To get to Europe, Trotter posed as a seaman seeking work in New York, and got a job as a cook on the SS Yarmouth to gain passage to France. He arrived in Paris alone and with little more than his cook's clothing, only to find that the principal peace negotiations had already taken place. The resulting treaty did not include any statement of racial equality. Trotter attracted the French press in his accounts of racial mistreatment in the United States, but he could not gain access to any of the official delegations to the peace conference. He also missed Du Bois' Pan-African Congress, which was held in February 1919 while he was still seeking passage.

Trotter returned to the United States in July 1919 to learn of ongoing race riots at major cities across the country. Postwar economic and social tensions had erupted, and blacks fought back against white violence in cities such as Chicago and Omaha. Trotter quickly supported active resistance to white-on-black violence, writing, "Unless the white American behaves, he will find that in teaching our boys to fight for him he was starting something that he will not be able to stop." His writings prompted calls in Congress for the censorship of the Negro press: South Carolina Congressman James F. Byrnes accused Trotter of "doing his utmost to incite riots and bloodshed." Massachusetts Senator Henry Cabot Lodge gave Trotter a chance to testify during Senate deliberations on ratification of the Treaty of Versailles, which Lodge opposed on grounds other than Trotter's. Lodge's opposition was successful: the Senate never ratified the treaty.

== Other protests and later years ==
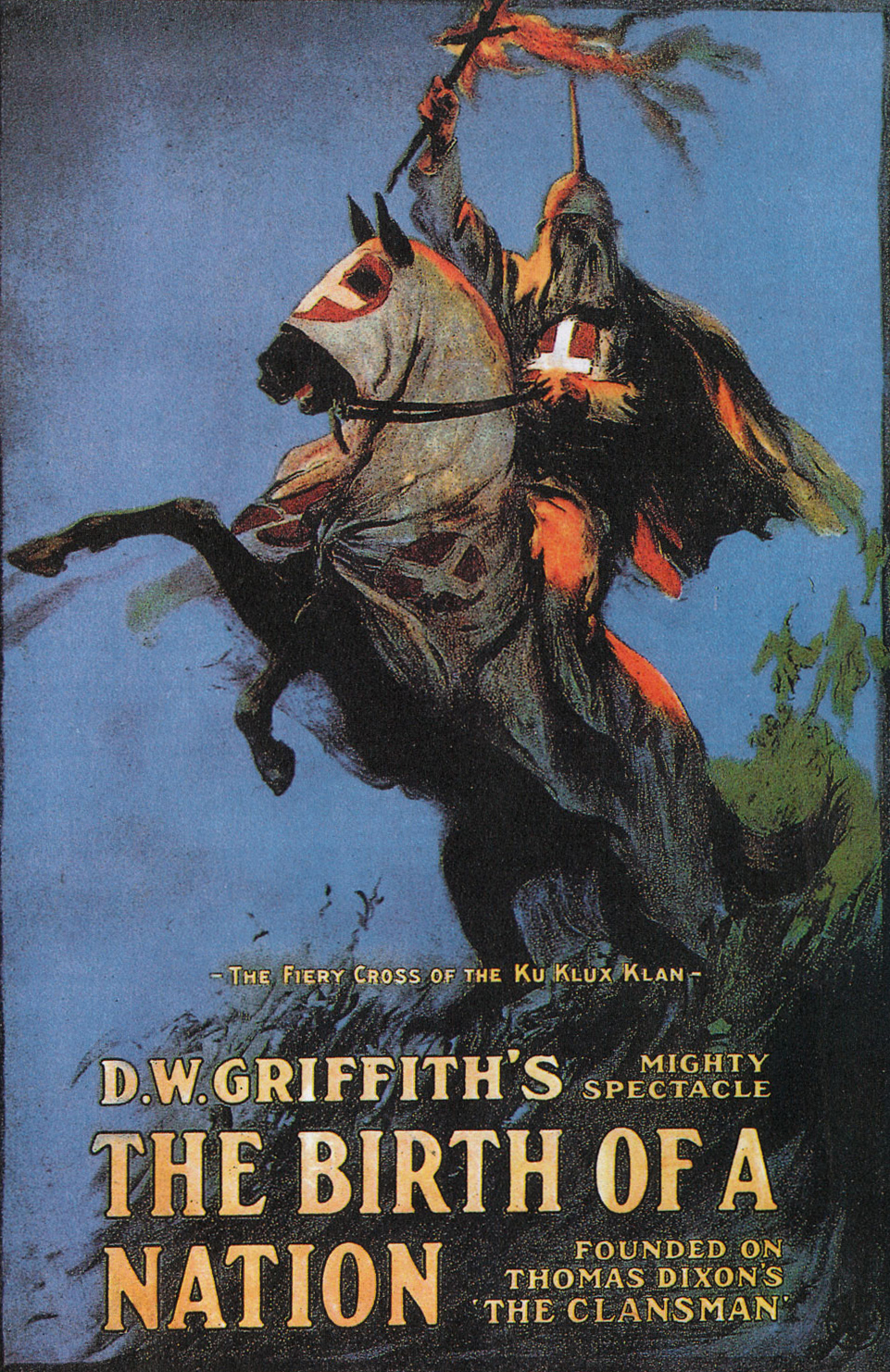
Theatrical poster for The Birth of a Nation

Trotter mounted a campaign against Thomas Dixon's play The Clansman when it opened in Boston in 1910; the play portrayed the Ku Klux Klan in heroic terms during Reconstruction. His protests succeeded in closing the production. While on his speaking tour in early 1915, he learned that D. W. Griffith's movie, The Birth of a Nation, adapted from The Clansman, would be opening in Boston. He rushed back to lead protests against the film. In April, the Tremont Theatre denied Trotter and a group of African Americans tickets to the showing. When they refused to leave the lobby, plainclothes police moved in, sparking a scuffle. Trotter and ten others were arrested; other protests took place both inside and outside the theater. Trotter, united with other factions of the African-American community, tried but could not get the film banned in Boston. This united front, along with the death later in 1915 of Booker T. Washington, reduced for a time the internal hostilities in the Boston African-American community.

The KKK had a revival for a decade after 1915, especially in industrial cities and the Midwest. In 1921, Trotter was successful in shutting down new screenings of The Birth of a Nation in Boston; he allied with Roman Catholic organizations, who objected to the KKK's anti-Catholic stance of the 20th century, and were strong in the city as a result of extensive Irish and Italian immigration.

Trotter's wife had died in the 1918 influenza pandemic. She had been a partner in all his activities and he missed her greatly.

Through the 1920s and 1930s, Trotter subsided into a genteel poverty, using the Guardian as an ongoing voice of protest. He lobbied for anti-lynching bills in Congress, with limited success. Even when the House overwhelmingly passed such a bill in 1922, the Southern bloc in the Senate filibustered and effectively killed passage of the bill for three years running. (White Democrats effectively controlled nearly all the Congressional seats apportioned to the total population of the South, after having disfranchised blacks.) They controlled chairmanships of numerous important committees, which were established by seniority.

In 1923, Trotter eventually came to an uneasy truce with the NAACP. His attempts to promote his style of activism, however, were eclipsed by activities of younger leaders, such as Marcus Garvey, a Jamaican immigrant in New York City and leader of the UNIA.

Through these years, Trotter routinely wrote in the Guardian about incidents of racial injustice, including the 1931 trials of the Scottsboro boys. They had been accused and were convicted of raping two white women in Alabama. Historians have concluded they were innocent.

On the morning of April 7, 1934, his 62nd birthday, William Monroe Trotter died after a fall from the roof of his home in Boston. The cause is uncertain, but it is known that he was depressed and troubled at the time. He may have committed suicide. He was buried in Boston's Fairview Cemetery.

== Legacy and honors ==
- Several schools and academic institutions were named for him: the William Monroe Trotter Elementary School in Dorchester, the William Monroe Trotter Institute at the University of Massachusetts Boston (a research institute for the study of black history and black culture), and the William Monroe Trotter Multicultural Center (aka Trotter House) at the University of Michigan.
- Trotter's first home in Dorchester, the William Monroe Trotter House, was designated a National Historic Landmark in recognition of his significance in the civil rights cause.
- In 2002, scholar Molefi Kete Asante listed William Monroe Trotter among his 100 Greatest African Americans.
