= Boston Guardian =

African-American newspaper

- Owner(s): William Monroe Trotter, George Forbes
- Publisher: William Monroe Trotter
- Editor: William Monroe Trotter
- Founded: 1901
- Ceased publication: 1957
- Headquarters: Boston, Massachusetts

The Boston Guardian was an African American newspaper, co-founded by William Monroe Trotter and George W. Forbes in 1901 in Boston and published until the 1950s.

== History ==
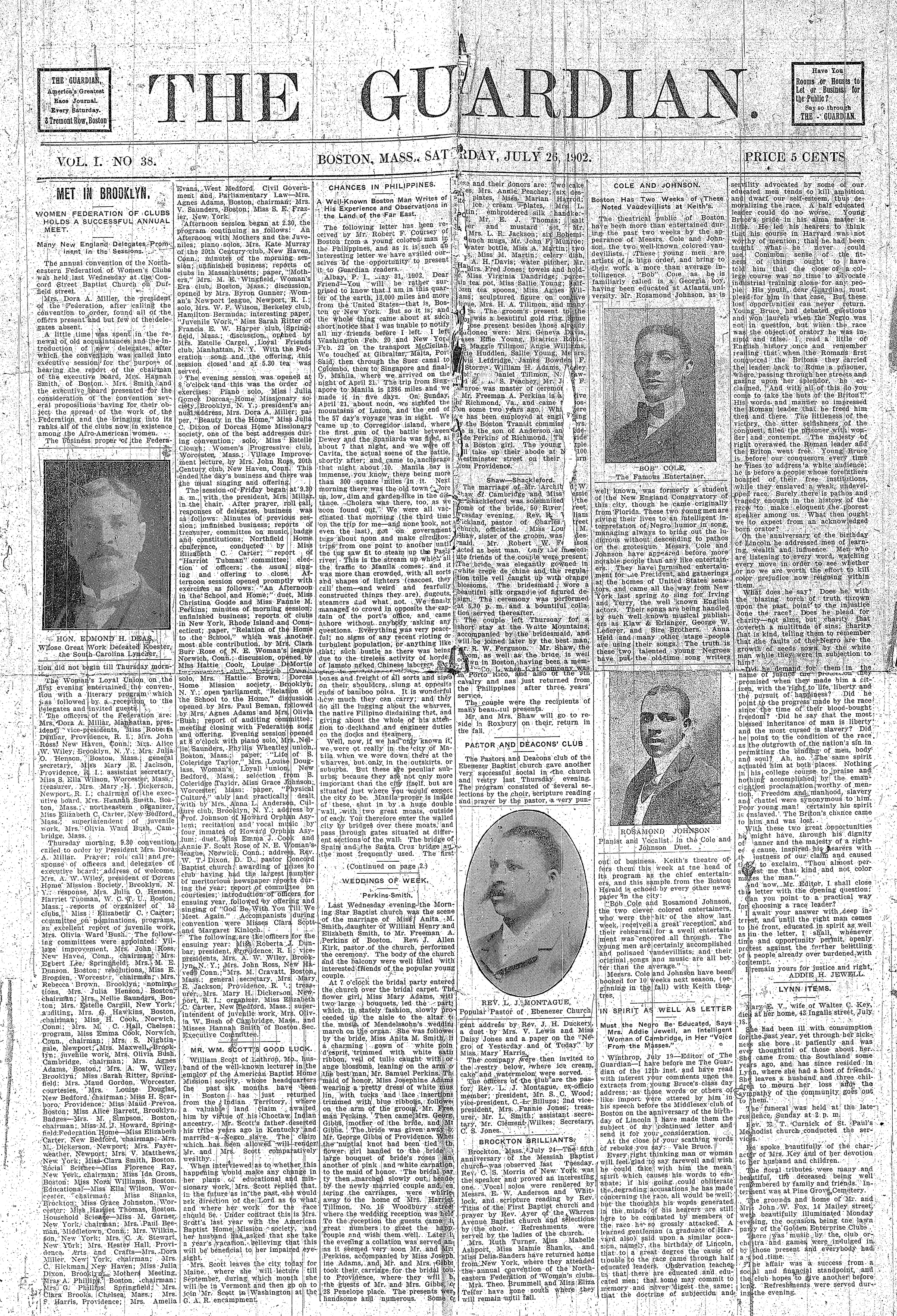
The Guardian, Vol I No 38, July 26 1902

The Guardian was founded in November 1901 and published in the same building that had once housed William Lloyd Garrison's The Liberator. In March 1901, Trotter helped organize the Boston Literary and Historical Association, a forum for militant race opinion.

The paper enjoyed broad appeal with readers outside of Massachusetts, featuring news of interest to people of color from across the nation, as well as social notes, church news, sports, and fiction. Within its editorial opinion columns, Trotter often assailed the conservative accommodationist ideology of Booker T. Washington, founder of the Tuskegee Institute.

The Guardian reached the peak of its circulation and prestige about the year 1910, roughly coinciding with the establishment of the NAACP, or National Association for the Advancement of Colored People, of which Trotter was a co-founder along with W. E. B. DuBois, et al. Trotter and Du Bois had previously joined with others in the formation of the Niagara Movement, which was an immediate predecessor to the NAACP.

Within the pages of the Guardian, Trotter criticized the slow progress in Negro social advancement in the face of institutional racism, discriminatory practices, and de jure segregation. When Thomas Dixon's 1905 play adaption of The Clansman was performed in Boston, the Guardian mounted a campaign that forced it from the stage. The stage production was adapted in 1915 into the film The Birth of a Nation by D. W. Griffith, which also faced a boycott campaign organized by the NAACP in Boston.

With high circulation and substantial advertising revenue, the Guardian enjoyed financial success in addition to crusading for civil rights. However, when William Monroe Trotter died in 1934 of an apparent accident at his home, the Guardian had already seen its best years. His sister, Maude Trotter Steward and her husband, Dr. Charles Steward edited the newspaper after his death. The newspaper eventually ceased publication in the 1950s.

== Reception ==
W. E. B. Du Bois attests to the influence and effectiveness of the Boston Guardian. In reference to W. M. Trotter's opposition to B. T. Washington, he wrote:

This opposition began to become vocal in 1901 when two men, Monroe Trotter, Harvard 1895, and George Forbes, Amherst 1895, began the publication of the Boston Guardian. The Guardian was bitter, satirical, and personal; but it was earnest, and it published facts. It attracted wide attention among colored people; it circulated among them all over the country; it was quoted and discussed. I did not wholly agree with the Guardian, and indeed only a few Negroes did, but nearly all read it and were influenced by it.

== Other uses of the name ==
In 2016, the name was taken up by a new weekly title, published in Boston on Fridays by Guard Dog Media Inc. The publication is a neighborhood newspaper serving the city of Boston. The publisher had previously produced the Boston Courant from 1995 to 2016. The new publication's name stirred up some controversy over the alleged appropriation of a historic journalistic name.

== See also ==
- African American newspapers
