= NIPL =

NIPL may refer to:

- National Independent Political League, a 20th-century American political organization
- NPCI International Payments Limited, part of the National Payments Corporation of India
