= New England Suffrage League =

American organization

New England Suffrage League was an organization of black voters in the United States. Its fourth annual meeting was held at Unity Hall in Hartford in 1907. The group addressed the Brownsville Affair. Its fifth annual meeting was held in 1908.

William Monroe Trotter was an organizer of the group. It was established as the Boston Suffrage League before being expanded. The group advocated for schools in the South, against lynching, against segregation on interstate carriers, and for enforcement of the 15th amendment. He and his wife, Geraldine Pindell Trotter, edited the Boston Guardian newspaper.

David E. Crawford worked with the group.

== See also ==
- National Negro American Political League
- National Independent Political League
- Union League
