= Edwin Orin Wood =

American politician

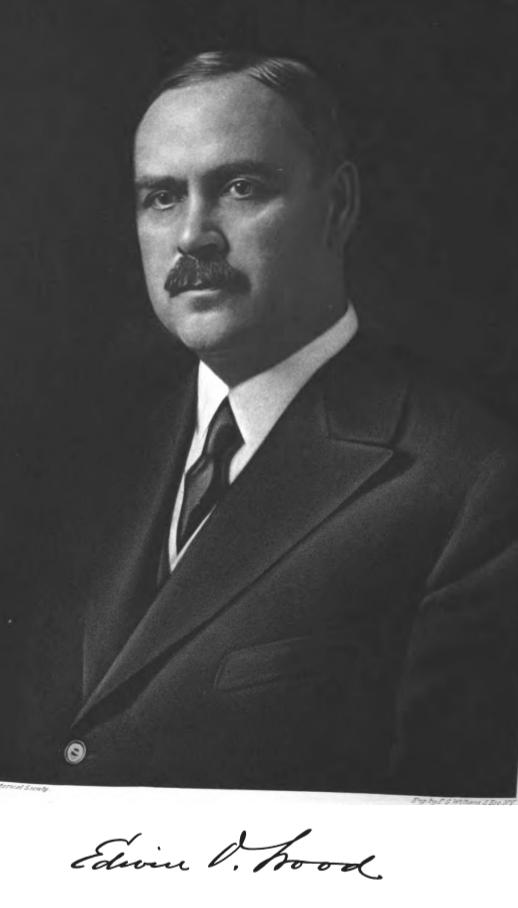

Edwin Orin Wood (October 29, 1861 – April 23, 1918) was an American politician. He served as chairman of the Democratic state committee of Michigan from 1904 to 1906.

== Biography ==
He was born at Goodrich, Michigan on October 29, 1861, to Paulina M. and Thomas Parmalee Wood both of whom came from western New York. He was member of the Democratic National Committee from Michigan from 1908 to 1916. He was also a delegate to 1912 Democratic National Convention and 1916 Democratic National Convention. He died on April 23, 1918, in Pasadena, California. He was buried in Flint, Michigan in Glenwood Cemetery.

== Career ==
Edwin Orin Wood, was a member of an old family which had made its home in the United States from pre-revolutionary days. His ancestors fought in the War for American Independence, and were ever moving out from the more settled regions of the country and seeking the frontier. Mr. Wood's parents, Thomas Parmelee and Paulina Wood, were Michigan pioneers, having removed to that State from Western New York prior to the Civil War. They settled at the town of Goodrich, Michigan, and there made their home until their deaths, their married life extending over a period of sixty-two years.

== Salesman ==
Born in Goodrich, Genesee county, Michigan, Edwin Orin Wood passed his childhood there, attending the local public school, and in addition pursued the study of Latin and Greek outside of school hours under the direction of the Rev. Saunderson, a Congregational minister in the town. Having completed his studies at the local institution he studied for a year at the Saginaw High School, after which, abandoning his formal education, he sought and secured a position in the general mercantile establishment conducted at Goodrich by D. M. Scriver, Seth B. Pixley and D. W. and William Campbell. After working there for a time he went to Metamore, Michigan, and there took a similar position in the store of Levi Campbell. He did not remain long at either establishment, however, but secured a clerical position in the clothing store of George W. Buckingham, of Flint, Michigan, and thus became acquainted with the town that was afterwards to be his home for many years. The latter position he held for a period of five years and then, in 1885, he was appointed a railway mail clerk, but shortly after resigned in order to accept a position as traveling salesman for the wholesale grocery firm of W. J. Gould & Company of Detroit, Michigan. Another five years was spent in that employment, and he was then chosen as the representative for Michigan of the New York clothing firm of Hackett, Carhart & Company.

== Customs official ==
Wood had already become a well-known figure in local affairs, and it was in March, 1893, that his purely business career was interrupted by his appointment to a very important post in the public service. The young man had displayed so much ability and initiative in his dealing with home affairs that he attracted to himself the favorable notice of the late Don M. Dickinson, leader of the Democratic party in Michigan for many years and a power in national affairs. It was upon the recommendation of this man that Wood was appointed the special agent of the United States Treasury by Secretary of the Treasury John G. Carlisle during the second administration of Grover Cleveland as President of the United States. The following May he was assigned to special work on the Pacific coast and at once became very active in his new duties. He seized the steamer Haytien Republic for violation of the revenue and immigration laws and a long lawsuit followed. More than thirty-two persons were made prisoners on this occasion and were indicted by a special grand jury called by Wood's request. The case resulting from this indictment was tried before the United States District Court at Portland, Oregon, and resulted in favor of the Government, but was appealed, first, in the United States Circuit Court of Appeals at San Francisco, and then in the United States Supreme Court. Both of these tribunals upheld the decision of the lower court. Wood was able to prove that there was a smuggling ring which included a number of federal officers and the owners of the Merchants Steamship Company, one of the vessels of which was the Haytien Republic, which he had captured, that this ring had through their operations defrauded the Government of a sum amounting to three hundred and sixty thousand dollars in the course of seven months. Wood was thanked personally by President Cleveland for his notable services in the case, and he followed it up with other cases which, if less in magnitude, had cumulative force so that it was acknowledged to have dealt the smuggling and other illicit interests in that part of the country a very severe blow. In 1897, Wood resigned his post as special agent for the Treasury, although he urged to remain by General O. L. Spaulding, Assistant Secretary of the Treasury.

== Politics ==
Wood had begun his career as a public officer very auspiciously, and from this time on his activities in this realm were at least as great and of even more importance than those connected with his private business. He did not, of course, neglect the latter, however, but even his business ventures in many cases were of a semi-public nature. Such was the case of the Loyal Guard, a fraternal beneficiary society that has since attained national prominence. Wood was one of a group of men who founded this organization, and he was the moving spirit in the matter to such an extent that he was elected its first president and held that office many years. The part played by him as president of the Loyal Guard brought him into wide prominence in this line of work and he was chosen president of the National Fraternal Press Association and the next year of the National Fraternal Congress. During this time he was also very active in Democratic politics in Michigan, and served for a considerable period as the president of the Genesee County Democratic Committee. In 1904 he was elected chairman of the Democratic State Central Committee. His term as chairman ended in 1906, succeeded by John T. Winship. He was delegate to the Democratic National Convention held in Denver in 1908, a delegate-at-large and chairman of the delegation in 1912 and a delegate-at-large again in 1916. Following the latter convention, which was held at St. Louis, Wood found it necessary to resign from the many committees of which he was an officer, as his business affairs required much of his time and made it essential that he should live to a great extent in New York City. He was, however, appointed by Governor Fred M. Warner, of Michigan, to the commission selected to purchase a silver service for the battleship Michigan, which had just been christened in honor of the State.

== Michigan Historical Commission ==
He was also offered a membership on the Michigan State Tax Commission by Governor Chase S. Osborn, but found it necessary to decline the honor. The interests of Mr. Wood in historical matters, especially in connection with his native region, had made him an active member of the Genesee County Pioneer and Historical Society, and upon the creation of the Michigan Historical Commission in 1913 by Governor Woodbridge N. Ferris, he was named one of its members. In 1916 he was chosen its president. In 1913 he was also made a member of the Mackinac Island State Park Commission by Governor Ferris, and served as vice-president of that body until his resignation in 1916.

== Centenary Peace Commission ==
In 1914 he was appointed a delegate to the Centenary Peace Commission by Governor Ferris, and the next year was a member of the Board of Arbitration representing Flint in the controversy over the price of gas to be charged the public by the company. This finally resulted in a reduction of the price from one dollar to eighty-five cents.

== General Motors ==
It was in 1910 that Mr. Wood was named a vice-president of the General Motors Company, and thus became associated with a concern of which he was still an officer at the time of his death. He did resign from the company when control of it was placed in the hands of a voting trust, but in 1915 he once more became connected with W.C. Durant, president of the concern, and the following year was chosen a director. Another important concern with which Wood was connected was the Industrial Savings Bank of Flint, it being his efforts that secured the required stock subscriptions which resulted in its organization.

== Fraternal organizations ==
In addition to the many affiliations mentioned above, Wood was a member of a large number of organizations of a fraternal character and was especially prominent as a Freemason. He had taken his thirty-third degree in this order, and was a member of all the important Masonic bodies in that part of the country, including the Lodge, Chapter, Royal Arch Masons; Council, Royal and Select Masters; Genesee Commandery, Knights Templar; and Temple, Ancient Arabic Order Nobles of the Mystic Shrine. He was president of the Pioneer Guard of Michigan Consistory, and a member of "Old Guard" of Genesee Commandery, Knights Templar, and of many other Masonic bodies. Outside of the Masonic order he was affiliated with the Benevolent and Protective Order of Elks and several other fraternal societies. It was Wood who, in company with other members of a committee, raised the necessary funds to build the Masonic Temple at Flint, and he remained a member of its board of trustees from its inception until his resignation in 1915.

The mere record of offices held, or even of material achievements accomplished, by Wood can give no adequate idea of his real influence in the community or of his peculiar talent as a leader of men. He was one with whom it was easy for other men to get along, and yet they invariably felt that back of his affable exterior and easy manners there was a will as inflexible as steel which would show itself wherever he might feel that a matter of principle was involved. This was well shown in his political life, where his adherence to what he considered his duties to the people and the State was absolute. In the case of his long friendship with Mr. Dickinson, the State Democratic leader, it was strikingly illustrated. As a young man he had won the approbation of the man who then, more than any other, controlled the actions of the party in Michigan, and was aided by him to the position in the United States Treasury service in which he made so great a reputation. A long friendship followed and yet, when Mr. Wood found that his conviction led along other paths from that which Mr. Dickinson chose, he took them unhesitatingly. This was the case in his support of William Jennings Bryan, which was wholehearted and ardent, but which led him away from many of his old political associates. How greatly he was trusted and admired by these associates is shown in the fact that he was the choice of his party for governor of the State in one election and was prominently mentioned by them as candidate for the vice-presidency of the United States.

== Authorship ==
Another very important activity of Mr. Wood was that performed by him as an author and historian. His great interest in the subject of history has already been mentioned, and he was connected with many societies of a historical character and other scientific organizations. Besides those given above were the American Museum of National History, the American Geographical Society, the American Historical Association, the American Irish Historical Society, the Michigan State Press Association, the New York Historical Society, the Mississippi Valley Historical Society, and the State Historical Societies of Michigan, Ohio, Indiana, Illinois, Wisconsin and Minnesota. He was the author of Historic Mackinac, a story of the growth and development of that region. He has also written A History of Genesee County, Michigan, and a great number of shorter articles on the history of Michigan and the old North-western Territory. Notre Dame University of Indiana conferred on Wood in 1916 the honorary degree of LL. D. He was a great reader, and his private library contained about twelve thousand volumes. Wood's clubs were the National Democratic, the Manhattan Club of New York City, the Rocky Mountain Club of New York City, the Elks Club, the Authors League of America, the Beaux Arts Club, and the Sons of the American Revolution.

== Marriage and children ==
Edwin Orin Wood was married, December 17, 1889, at Flint, Michigan, with Emily Crocker, a daughter of Stephen and Prudence Crocker, pioneer residents of Genesee county. Four children were born to them as follows: Dwight Hulbert, who met his death in an accident at Flint when fourteen years of age; Albert Crocker, who also met his death in an accident in 1915; Leland Stanford, mentioned below; and Mary В., born December 1, 1897.

Leland Stanford Wood was born December 14, 1894, at Flint, and was educated at the Lawrenceville Preparatory School, from which he graduated in 1912, the Detroit University School, where he completed his preparation for college in 1913, and finally the University of Michigan, from which he graduated with the class of 1916. Upon completing his studies he became assistant sales manager of the Chevrolet Motor Company of New York. He was an ensign in the United States Navy, on board the USS Niagara during World War I.
