= National Independent Political League =

Former 20th century African American civil rights group

- Abbreviation: NIPL
- Formation: 1908
- Founder: William Monroe Trotter
- Founded at: Chicago, Illinois, United States
- Dissolved: c. 1921
- Type: Political advocacy organization
- Legal status: Defunct
- Purpose: Racial equality
- Region served: United States
- Official language: English
- Main organ: National Conventions
- Affiliations: Niagara Movement, National Afro-American Council, Constitutional League
- Formerly called: National Negro American Political League; National Independent Equal Rights League

The National Independent Political League (NIPL) was an American political organization that sought racial and social justice in the early 20th century. Considered a militant group, NIPL was founded by William Monroe Trotter in 1908 as the National Negro American Political League and operated until around 1920 as the National Independent Equal Rights League. In contrast to its more successful contemporary, the NAACP, NIPL was led and funded by African Americans. Historian Mark Schneider notes that NIPL "foreshadowed the militant organizations of the 1950s and 1960s that bypassed the NAACP."

== History ==
In 1907, civil rights activist and journalist William Monroe Trotter resigned from the Niagara Movement race organization because of disagreements with W. E. B. Du Bois and Clemont G. Morgan, state secretary of the Niagara Movement's Massachusetts branch. Trotter supported a more militant or direct approach to the civil rights movement, disagreeing with Booker T. Washington's accomdationist approach, acceptance of segregation, and willingness to support industrial education for Blacks over securing their right to vote. Without Trotter, the Niagara Movement went defunct.

In 1908, Trotter met with Bishop Alexander Walters and Rev. J. Milton Waldron of Washington, D.C. to establish The National Negro American Political League, called the National Independent Political League (NIPL) by 1910. The group officially organized in Chicago in June 1908. Trotter served as its spokesperson and secretary; Waldron, who was strongly against Booker T. Washington, became its president. Officers listed on the group's letterhead in 1908 were:

- Rev. J. Milton Waldron of Washington, D.C., president
- Gurley Brewer of Indiana, 1st vice president
- Bishop Henry M. Turner of Georgia, 2nd vice president
- Rev. Byron Gunner of New York, 3rd vice president
- George H. Woodson Esq. of Iowa, 4th vice president
- E. T. Morris of Massachusetts, 5th vice president
- William Ashbie Hawkins of Maryland, 6th vice president
- George Henry White of Philadelphia, treasurer
- Rev. L. G. Jordan of Kentucky, recording secretary
- W. T. Ferguson of Washington, D.C., assistant recording secretary
- William Monroe Trotter of Boston, corresponding secretary
- Rev. S. L. Carrothers of Washington, D.C., financial secretary
- Granville T. Martin of New York, sergeant at arms

The founding members of NIPL came from the National Afro-American Council, the Constitutional League, and the Niagara Movement. NIPL activities included "opposition to disfranchisement, peonage, Jim Crow cars, and support for equal education, national legislation against lynching, and the restoration of the discharged Brownsville soldiers." Its slogans included, "In a Republic the Ballot is the Citizen's Most Powerful Weapon" and "A United People is a Powerful People". In 1908, the NIPL published Jim-Crow Car Laws and the Republican Party.

A race conference was held in New York in May 1909 that included both Black and White speakers. One outcome of the conference was a forty-person committee to form a new race organization. Trotter was not one of the twelve Blacks selected for the committee that established the National Association for the Advancement of Colored People (NAACP) in 1910. However, NIPL differed from the NAACP because its leaders and funders were all Black. Furthermore, Trotter was suspicious of the White backers of the NAACP.

NIPL held a convention in Columbus in May 1909 and in Atlantic City in 1910. Walters was elected NIPL president in 1910. At the national convention in Boston in August 1911, J. R. Clifford of West Virginia was elected NIPL president. A goal of the 1911 convention was to plan for the 1912 presidential election. Speakers for the event included Edward Everett Brown, Byron Gunner, Albert E. Pillsbury, and Frank Sanborn, along with S. L. Carrothers, J. Milton Waldron, and Walters. However, the 1911 convention was poorly attended.

In 1912, NIPL published Fifty Years of Physical Freedom and Political Bondage, 1862–1912 and The Political Situation in a Nut-shell; Some Un-colored Truths for Colored Voters, and The Case Against Taft and Roosevelt from the Standpoint of the Colored Voters.

NIPL decided to support William Howard Taft over Theodore Roosevelt for the Republican nomination for president during its 1911 national convention. However, Clifford preferred Roosevelt who created the Progressive Party after the 1912 Republican National Convention. In July 1912, NIPL split into two groups which claimed to be official—one led by Clifford and the other led by Trotter. Although the group was fragmented, Trotter campaigned for Wilson, using the resources of his newspaper. Wilson won the election but almost immediately affirmed segregation as a policy for the federal government.

In 1913, NIPL collected twenty thousand signatures on a petition that demanded the desegregation in federal offices; this was delivered to President Wilson. An NIPL delegation met with Wilson in 1913 and, again in 1914. After the first meeting, the group was optimistic, but Trotter's disillusionment with Wilson showed at the November 12, 1914 meeting in the Oval Office. Trotter spoke boldly on the matter, angering Wilson who felt as if his integrity was being challenged. Later, Trotter discussed the confidential meeting with the media, noting that Wilson's policies went against a desegregated system that had worked well for fifty years.

This publicity gave Trotter and the NIPL a wider audience but did not attract more members to the organization. The group held its seventh annual convention from September 7 through 9, 1914 in New York City. NIPL changed its name to the National Independent Equal Rights League (NIERL) to minimize the stigma of having supported Wilson. When The Birth of a Nation was released in 1915, NIERL mobilized the Black community to protest the film, which glorified the Ku Klux Klan. In Boston, around 500 Blacks protested outside of the Tremont Theater on April 17, with some throwing eggs at the movie screen.

In 1919, Trotter went uninvited to the 1919 Peace Conference in Paris to represent the NIERL on behalf of Black interests. When this effort was unsuccessful, he wrote articles for the French press about the conditions of Blacks in the United States. When he returned to the United States, Trotter was well-received and spoke to large audiences in New York and Washington, D.C.

By 1921, the league dissolved, having been outpaced by the NAACP which had more money and the support of powerful whites. Historian Mark Schneider notes that NIPL "foreshadowed the militant organizations of the 1950s and 1960s that bypassed the NAACP."

== Publications ==
- Jim-Crow Car Laws and the Republican Party (1908)
- Fifty Years of Physical Freedom and Political Bondage, 1862–1912 (1912)
- The Political Situation in a Nut-shell; Some Un-colored Truths for Colored Voters by John Milton Waldron and John D. Harkless (1912)
- A Collection of Booklets and Circulars Relating to the Campaign of the National Independent Political League in National Politics for the Year 1912 (1912)
- The Case Against Taft and Roosevelt from the Standpoint of the Colored Voters (1912)
- "The Second Emancipation of the Race; The Colored Man Learning to Use His Ballot for His Own Protection, Supporting Men and Measures Rather Than Parties" (1912)

== See also ==
- National Equal Rights League
- Colored Citizens Protective League
