= National Afro-American Council =

US civil rights organization

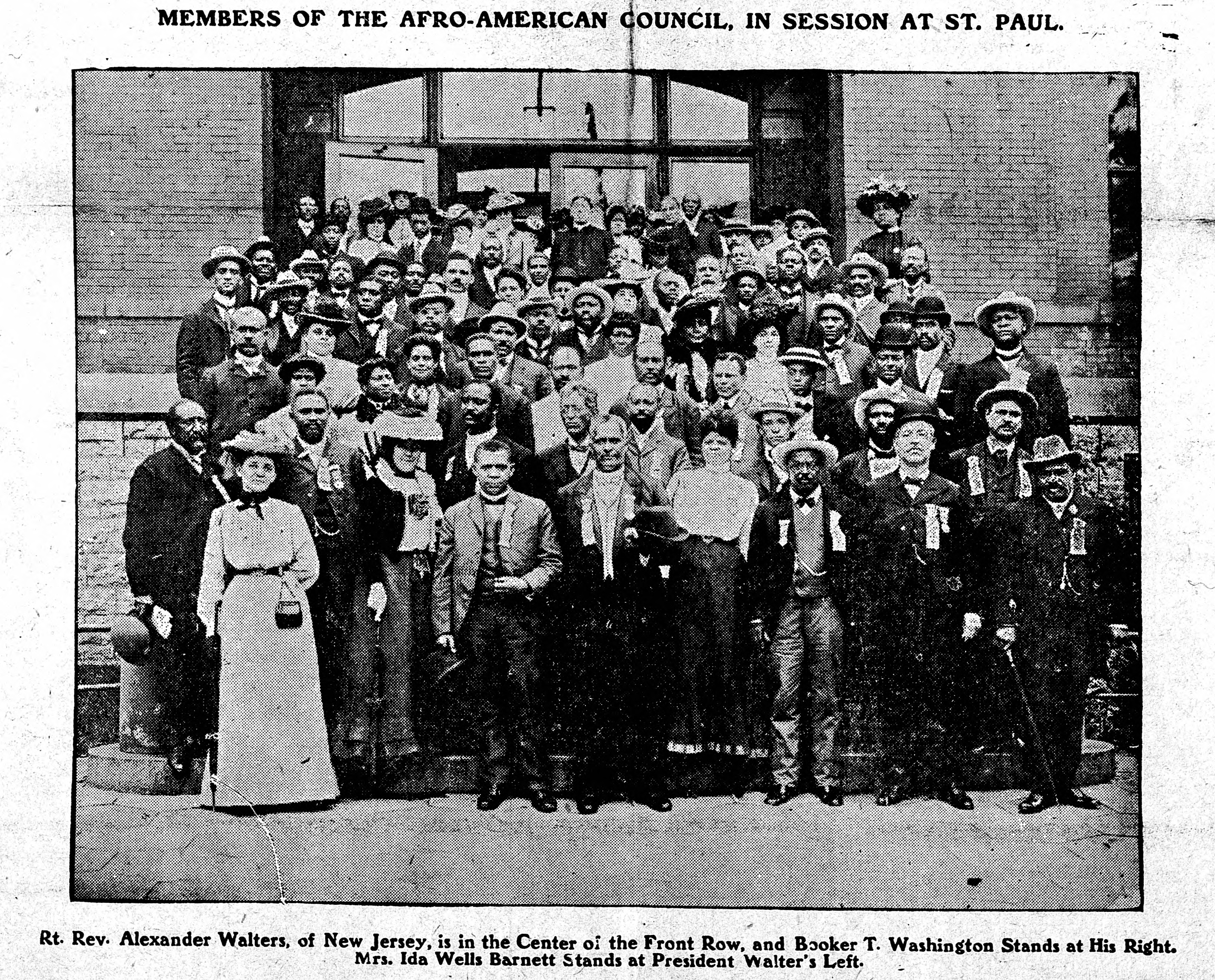
- Afro-American Council at 1902 meeting in St. Paul, Minnesota. President Alexander Walters is front Center, with Ida B. Wells on his left, Booker T. Washington on his right. William H. Steward, T. Thomas Fortune, W. E. B. Du Bois, and Emmett Jay Scott are all in the second row.
- Formation: 1898
- Dissolved: 1907
- Type: Non-profit organization
- Purpose: African-American civil rights
- Presidents: Alexander Walters (1898–1902, 1905–07); Timothy Thomas Fortune (1902–04); William A. Pledger (1903 acting); William Henry Steward (1904–05)

The National Afro-American Council was the first nationwide civil rights organization in the United States, created in 1898 in Rochester, New York. Before its dissolution a decade later, the Council provided both the first national arena for discussion of critical issues for African Americans and a training ground for some of the nation's most famous civil rights leaders in the 1910s, 1920s, and beyond.

== History ==
Led by A.M.E. Zion Bishop Alexander Walters, who was president for most of the Council's existence, the Council attracted a wide range of African-American journalists, lawyers, educators, politicians, and community activists to its annual meetings. The Council was the brainchild of New York journalist Timothy Thomas Fortune, whose earlier attempt—the National Afro-American League—had failed to generate momentum, and disappeared in the early 1890s.

The Council was formed against a backdrop of violent lynchings and of increasing disfranchisement of African-American voters in the South. Alarmed by the lynchings and racial discrimination against African Americans, Bishop Walters circulated a national letter of appeal in the spring of 1898, just weeks after the brutal murder of African-American postmaster Frazier B. Baker in Lake City, South Carolina by an armed mob of whites. "It becomes absolutely necessary that we organize to protect ourselves," Walters wrote, and more than 150 leaders from across the country signed the letter, which was published in Fortune's New York Age. Some of them attended the organizational meeting in September 1898 in Rochester, following the dedication of a statue to the late abolitionist leader, Frederick Douglass.

The meeting endorsed creation of a non-partisan Council, to be supported by annual dues payments and based on the ideals expressed by the earlier League. Bishop Walters was elected as president, after Fortune declined to serve; other officers included journalist Ida B. Wells-Barnett of Chicago, secretary, and federal customs official John C. Dancy of North Carolina, first vice president.

The annual meetings began three months later in Washington, D.C., and were held each year thereafter in a large American city, attracting a vibrant cross-section of African-American leaders. Although the overwhelming majority of its members were Republicans, the Council also boasted an active minority of black Democrats, in an unusual arrangement facilitated by the group's constitution, which mandated the nonpartisan nature of its proceedings and activities. It was among the first national organizations to welcome women members and treat them equally with men; many of the national officers were women, and at least one woman from every state served on the national executive committee.

The Council lobbied actively for the passage of a federal anti-lynching law and raised funds to finance a court test against the new Louisiana constitution's provision effectively disfranchising most of that state's black voters, under the terms of its so-called "grandfather clause." Men judged to be illiterate were deprived of suffrage rights, but white voters with ancestors who had been registered to vote before a certain date were exempted form the literacy requirement. African Americans were unable to qualify for the exemption. The court test, known as Ryanes v. Gleason, was expected to be taken all the way to the U.S. Supreme Court, but was eventually dropped, after an unfavorable ruling in the Louisiana Supreme Court.

The Council was designed as an umbrella group, with membership based on organizational affiliation—either in a local or state branch of the Council or through an affiliated organization, school, or newspaper. Officers were elected annually at the meetings, and consisted of a president, nine vice presidents, several secretaries, a treasurer, and a national organizer, among others. In addition, a large national executive committee was composed of three members from each U.S. state or territory, including one female member from each.

The Council was considered the nation's premier organization of African Americans, and met regularly with U.S. President William McKinley until his death in 1901. Its meetings were given extensive coverage by local newspapers, both mainstream dailies and African-American weeklies, in each host city. The Council met in Chicago (1899), Indianapolis (1900), Philadelphia (1901), and Saint Paul, Minnesota (1902). In 1903, the Council convened in Louisville, Kentucky, followed by St. Louis (1904), Detroit (1905), and New York City (1906). Its final meeting was held in 1907 at Baltimore, Maryland.

== Leaders and other officials ==
Walters, who served as president until 1902, was succeeded that year by Fortune. Fortune then served until his resignation in 1904, although William A. Pledger served as acting president in 1903. Fortune was followed by first vice president William Henry Steward of Kentucky, who served until Walters's reelection in 1905. Bishop Walters was then reelected in 1906 and 1907.

Early officers in the Council included the nation's only black congressman, Rep. George Henry White (R-N.C.), who served several terms as vice president and sought twice, unsuccessfully, to be elected president; Bishop Benjamin W. Arnett of Ohio and attorney William H. Lewis of Boston, both vice presidents; attorney Fredrick L. McGhee of Minnesota, who held several offices; Ida B. Wells-Barnett, first secretary and national organizer; journalists William A. Pledger, Harry Clay Smith, and Christopher Perry, all vice presidents; future U.S. minister to Liberia Ernest Lyon of Maryland, Washington, D.C., orator and activist Mary Church Terrell, and Philadelphia activist Gertrude Mossell, all vice presidents.

The Council's functional bureaus conducted much of its ongoing work between annual meetings, including work in education, business, anti-lynching activities, and legislation. Among many bureau directors during the Council's existence were Professor W. E. B. Du Bois, who chaired the business bureau from 1899 to 1901; former Louisiana Gov. P. B. S. Pinchback, literary bureau (1899); Archibald H. Grimké, literary (1907); Wells-Barnett, Mrs. Terrell, and newspaper publisher George L. Knox, each of whom chaired the anti-lynching bureau; and William T. Vernon, a future U.S. Treasury Register who chaired the education bureau in 1902.

Among notable members of the national executive committee were Booker T. Washington of Alabama (1902); federal official John P. Green (1898) and professor William S. Scarborough (1900) of Ohio; anti-Tuskegee activist William Monroe Trotter of Massachusetts; former congressman George W. Murray and future U.S. minister to Liberia William D. Crum of South Carolina (1900); future U.S. minister to Liberia John R. A. Crossland of Missouri (1900); Henry O. Flipper of New Mexico (1901), the first black graduate of West Point; and U.S. Treasury Register Judson W. Lyons of Georgia (1900).

The Council came under the influence of Booker T. Washington in 1902, after Washington engineered the selection of Fortune as president, but quickly lost its earlier effectiveness and grew dormant. After the emergence of the Niagara Movement in 1905, Walters attempted to rejuvenate the Council and distance it from the Tuskegee orbit, hoping to attract new members and bring back older members who had grown disenchanted, such as Du Bois, McGhee, and others.

== Collapse in 1907 ==
Despite well-publicized meetings in New York in 1906 and Baltimore in 1907, the Council failed to stabilize and soon collapsed, due to internal friction and lack of revenue. After a proposed merger between the Council and three other groups—the Negro Academy, the Niagara Movement, and the National Negro American Political League—failed to materialize, the Council faded away. Walters became president of yet another new grouping, the National Independent Political League, and eventually joined the NAACP (National Association for the Advancement of Colored People), formed by 1910. Many other former leaders of the Council, including Du Bois, George White, Mary Church Terrell, and Archibald Grimké, also helped form the core of the new NAACP, while others joined the new National Urban League.

== Bibliography ==
- Justesen, Benjamin R. Broken Brotherhood: The Rise and Fall of the National Afro-American Council. SIU Press, 2008.
