= Lewis Garnett Jordan =

Missionary, church leader, and civil rights advocate

Lewis Garnett Jordan (uncertain-1834 or 1839) was a Black American Baptist missionary who rose from slavery to lead religious and civic organizations in the United States.

Jordan traveled to Liberia, the West Indies, and Europe.

He was enslaved as a child. He led the National Baptist's Foreign Missions Board. He advocated temperance.

He was recording secretary for the National Negro American Political League.

He wrote Up the Ladder in Foreign Missions (1901) and Pebbles from an African Beach (1917). His Negro Baptist History U.S.A., 1750-1930 was published in 1930 and again in 1939. He wrote an autobiography titled On Two Henispheres; Bits from the Life of Lewis G. Jordan as told by himself.

He wrote about Hattie Presley. Nannie Helen Burroughs worked as his assistant.
