= Elmore W. Hurst =

American politician

Elmore Wallace Hurst
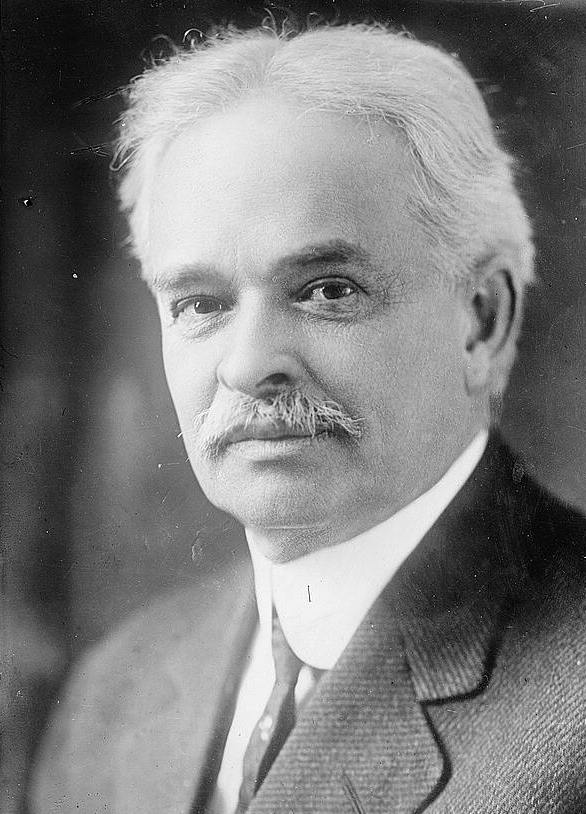
- Hurst circa 1915

Member of the Illinois House of Representatives

Personal details
- Born: December 6, 1851 Rock Island, Illinois, US
- Died: July 21, 1915 (aged 63) Rock Island, Illinois, US
- Party: Democratic
- Spouse: Harriet M. Fieldand (m. 1873)

Elmore Wallace Hurst (December 6, 1851 – July 21, 1915) was an American politician and lawyer who served as a Democrat in the Illinois House of Representatives.

== Biography ==
Hurst was born on December 6, 1851, in Rock Island, Illinois, to William and Anna (Hurlock) Hurst. William and Ann were from Delaware, with William having moved to Rock Island in 1837, as a merchant. On May 29, 1873, Hurst married Harriet M. Fieldand, and for many years they lived on the corner of Nineteenth Street and Sixth Avenue in Rock Island, Illinois.

== Political career ==
Hurst was a member of the Democratic Party and was elected to the Illinois House of Representatives in 1888. He was re-nominated for re-election two years later in 1890, but declined the nomination. Hurst was once again elected to the Illinois House of Representatives in 1900, and his popularity in Illinois led him to being mentioned as a candidate for governor multiple times, but he never entered any sort of election. In 1912, Hurst was a democratic candidate for vice president of the united states and received 73 delegate votes on the first vice presidential ballot, including all 53 votes from the Illinois delegation at that years Democratic National Convention. Hurst lost the race to Thomas Marshall, the governor of Indiana and the eventual winner of the vice presidency.

== Death ==
Hurst died on July 21, 1915, at his home in Rock Island, Illinois at the age of 63.
