= David E. Crawford =

American businessman (1869–?)

David Eugene Crawford
- Born: December 26, 1869; Lynchburg, Virginia, United States
- Died: Unknown
- Education: Hampton Institute, Northeastern College
- Occupations: Banker, lawyer, real estate investor
- Known for: Founder of the first Black-owned cooperative bank in the United States
- Spouse: Almira G. Lewis (m. 1894–1965)
- Children: 4

David Eugene Crawford (December 26, 1869–?), was an American banker, lawyer, and real estate investor in Boston, Massachusetts. He founded Eureka Co–Operative Bank of Boston in 1910, the first Black-owned cooperative bank in the nation.

== Early life and education ==
David Eugene Crawford was born on December 26, 1869 in Lynchburg, Virginia. He attended Hampton Institute (now Hampton University) from 1884 to 1887; followed by study at Northeastern College (now Northeastern University) from 1900 to 1904.

He married Almira G. Lewis on December 23, 1894; together they had four children.

== Career ==
In 1907, Crawford was admitted to the Bar. He was involved in local civic movements and worked with the New England Suffrage League. He served as treasurer of Ebenezer Baptist Church, where he was also a parishioner.

Crawford served as manager and treasurer of Eureka Co-operative Bank of Boston, which he founded in 1910. It was at 936 Tremont Street. Robert G. Smith was its president and J. W. A. Crawford, D. E. Crawford, F. N. Johnson, S. L. Merchant, R. G. Smith, and J. B. Stokes its board of directors.

In 1916 he was a delegate to the Republican National Convention in Chicago.

He had a home address of 14 Wellington Street in Boston. Crawford had extensive real estate holdings, including 936, 938, and 940 Tremont Street in Boston. He also owned commercial properties and apartment complexes.

== See also ==
- History of African Americans in Boston
