= Alexander Walters =

American civil rights activist (1858–1917)

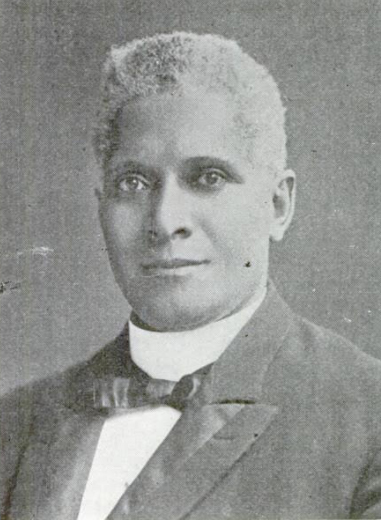
- Born: August 1, 1858; Bardstown, Kentucky, U.S.
- Died: February 2, 1917 (aged 58); New York, New York, U.S.
- Occupation: Minister
- Political party: Democratic

Religious life
- Religion: AME Zion

Alexander Walters (August 1, 1858 – February 2, 1917) was an American clergyman and civil rights leader. Born enslaved in Bardstown, Kentucky, just before the Civil War, he rose to become a bishop in the African Methodist Episcopal Zion Church at the age of 33, then president of the National Afro-American Council, the nation's largest civil rights organization, at the age of 40, serving in that post for most of the next decade.

== Biography ==
Walters was born August 1, 1858, in Bardstown, Kentucky, the oldest son of Henry and Harriet Walters. He was educated at a private school taught by a number of teachers. In 1871 he moved to Louisville, where he worked as a waiter in private homes, hotels, and on steamboats. He was valedictorian of his high school class in 1875. Within two years, he was licensed to preach by the A.M.E. Zion Quarterly Conference. He started out as a circuit minister, first serving the Corydon Circuit and then in 1881 the Cloverport Circuit where he founded five new churches. As a circuit minister he supplemented his income as a teacher in black schools. One of his students was Joseph Seamon Cotter, Sr. with whom he had a great influence. He then served pastorates in Indianapolis, Louisville, San Francisco, Portland, Oregon, Chattanooga, and Knoxville, Tennessee, before his assignment to Mother Zion Church in New York City in 1888.

In 1889, Walters was selected to represent the Zion Church in London at the World's Sunday School Convention, and went on to visit other parts of Europe, Egypt, and the Holy Land. In May 1892, he was elected bishop of the Seventh District of the General Conference of the A.M.E. Zion Church, meeting in Pittsburgh.

While in New York, he became acquainted with journalist Timothy Thomas Fortune, who was in the process of organizing his National Afro-American League, designed to protect African Americans against lynching and racial discrimination. Walters immediately endorsed the League, which met in early 1890 in Knoxville, but went defunct by 1893.

=== National Afro-American Council ===
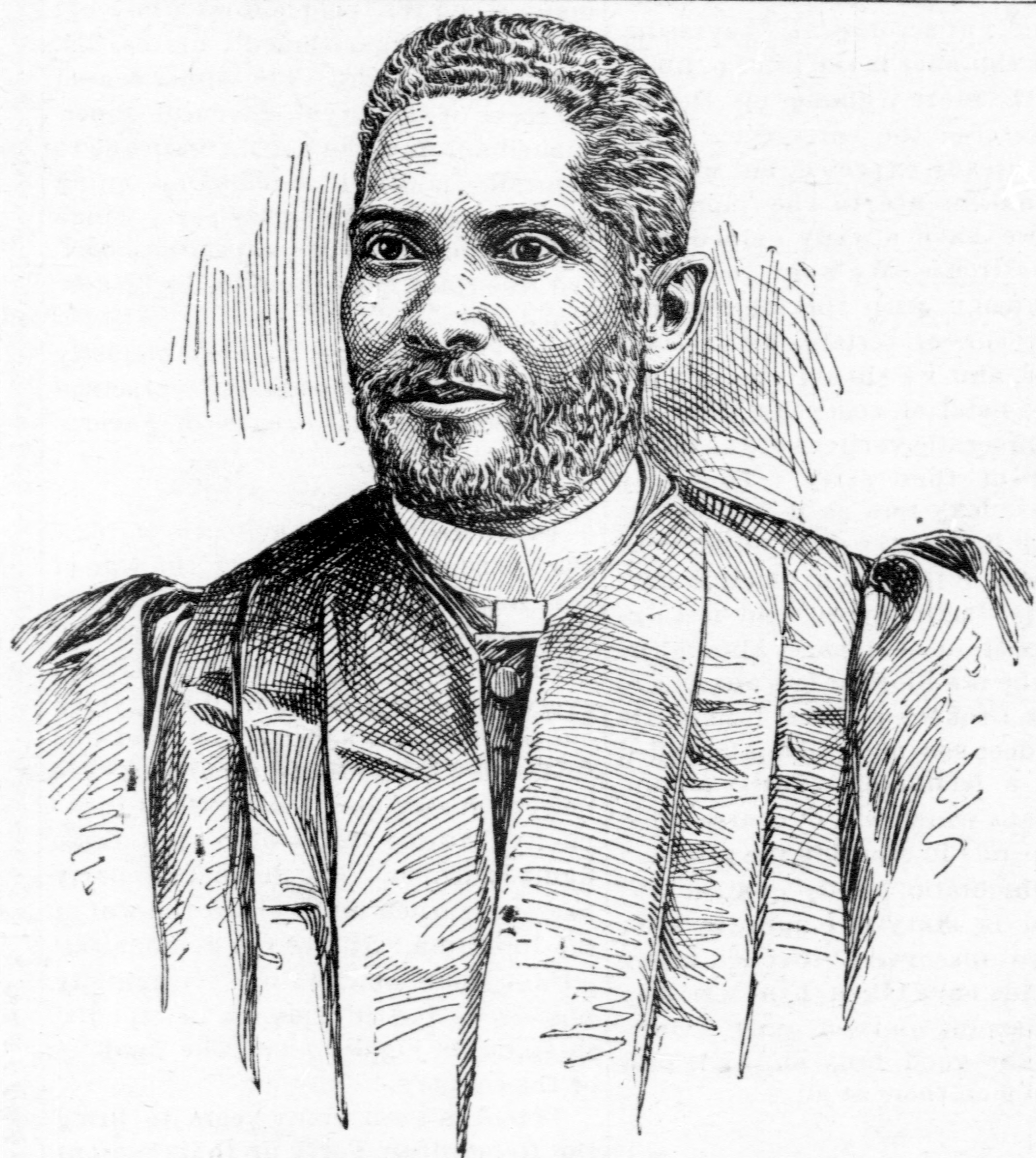
c. 1900

In March 1898, alarmed by an upsurge in violent lynchings of African Americans across the country, Walters asked Fortune to publish a nationwide appeal for a meeting of African-American leaders. More than 150 leaders from across the country signed the call, which resulted in an organizational meeting in Rochester, New York, in September 1898, also attended by Susan B. Anthony and the widow of Frederick Douglass.

The new National Afro-American Council was intended to replicate the old League. Its constitution declared the Council nonpartisan in nature, and envisioned a structure of state and local councils, gathered together in annual meetings with delegates from affiliated organizations, schools, and newspapers, to protest against racial injustice and discrimination and to lobby for protective laws. Walters was elected the first president, while Fortune became the first chairman of the executive committee.

Beginning in Washington, D.C., in December 1898, the Council met in large cities around the country, attracting large audiences of African-American journalists, clergymen, lawyers, educators, and community activists. Its officers included a wide range of influential African-American men and women. The Council met in Chicago (1899), Indianapolis (1900), and Philadelphia (1901), each time re-electing Walters to the presidency and adopting outspoken, occasionally radical resolutions.

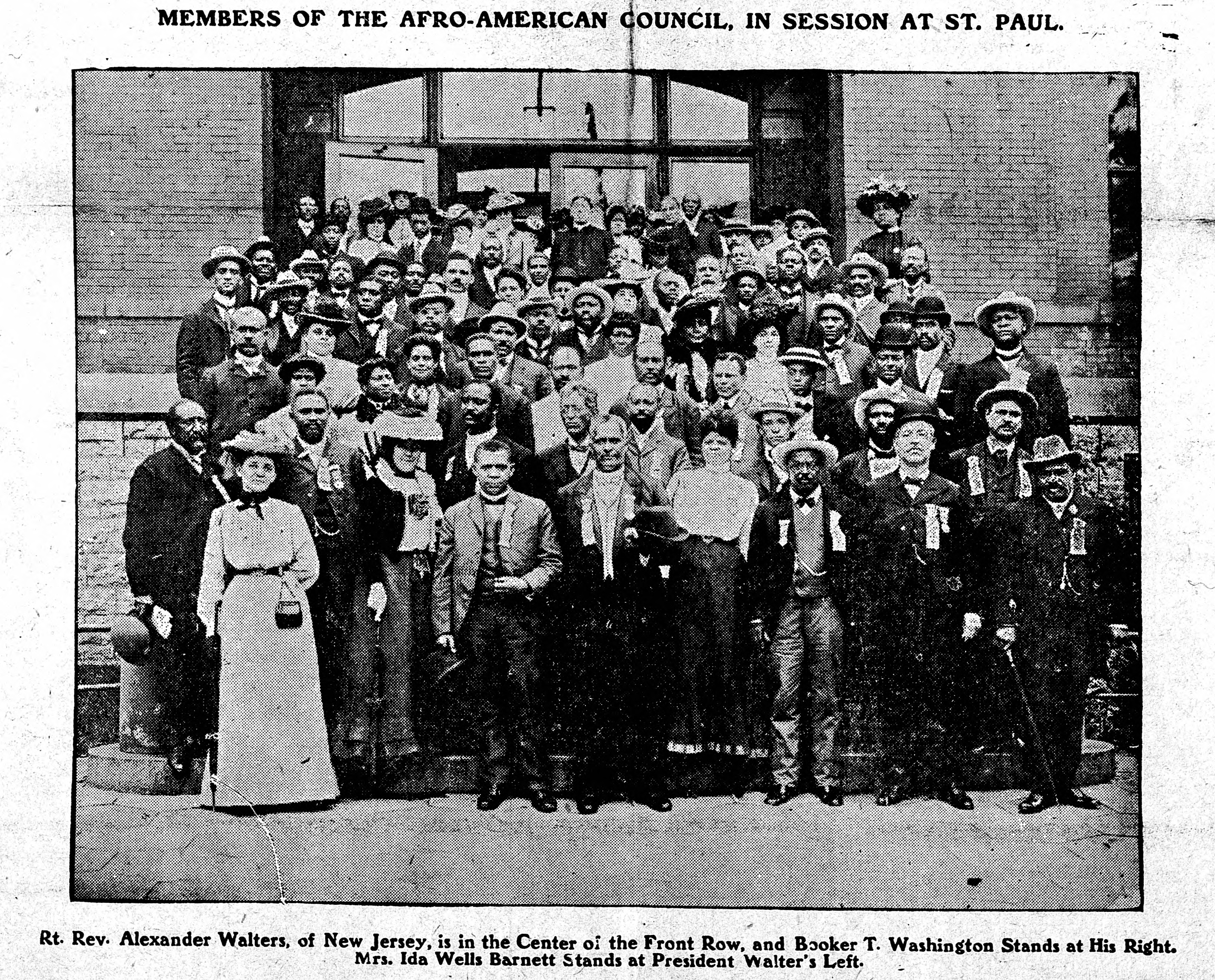
Afro-American Council at 1902 meeting in Saint Paul, Minnesota

At the meeting in Saint Paul, Minnesota, in 1902, Walters stepped aside to become chairman of the executive committee, and Fortune was promoted to president. A protégé of Booker T. Washington, Fortune began to steer the Council away from the independent course favored by Walters, and the Council soon slid into dormancy. Walters bided his time, regaining the presidency in Detroit in 1905, after issuing an appeal to old members to return. He was reelected at New York (1906) and Baltimore (1907), but the Council, now under the control of militant members of the Niagara Movement, gradually lost its cohesiveness and stability.

Walters' prominence had grown to such a level that on January 10, 1916, he met with President Woodrow Wilson at the White House to discuss how best to obtain the confirmation of African-Americans nominated for federal office by Wilson. Writing to Wilson, after that meeting Walters said: "After leaving the White House the idea occurred to me that it might be a good thing to see the Senators who have declared themselves opposed to the Confirmation of colored men who are nominated by yourself for office." He continues: "If you have not any objection, I would like to take up with the Senators the matter of Confirmation of colored men for it would greatly handicap us in the Fall Campaign and would be all the Republicans would want to use against us to be able to say for certainty that Democratic Senators will not confirm colored men. We will not insist on the nomination of a colored man for the Recorder of Deeds but we do think, that a similar office carrying about the same salary should be given us...To surrender would destroy our chances of building up the Colored Democratic Organization."

=== Later life ===
In 1908, Walters refused an offer by W. E. B. Du Bois to merge the council with the Niagara Movement and two other organizations. Walters angered many black followers by endorsing Democratic presidential candidate William Jennings Bryan in 1908. The council soon dissolved, but Walters wasted little time seeking a new power base, emerging as president of the new National Independent Political League.

In the 1910s, he became a member of both the new National Association for the Advancement of Colored People (NAACP) and the National Urban League. Walters traveled abroad frequently, including frequent trips to London, where he attended the First Pan-African Conference in 1900 (giving a paper entitled "The Trials and Tribulations of the Coloured Race in America"), and becoming President of the Pan-African Association, and visited West Africa in 1910 and the Caribbean in 1911. A well-respected figure internationally, he declined an offer in 1915 by US President Woodrow Wilson to become US minister to Liberia. Walters died on February 2, 1917, in New York City, of natural causes. His funeral was at Zion Church; his eulogy was said by Bishop G. W. Clinton, while services were conducted by Bishop J. S. Caldwell and assisted by Rev J. W. Brown.

== Private life ==
Walters was married three times and had six children. His first wife, Katie Knox Walters, died in 1896; his second wife, Emeline Virginia Byrd Walters, died in 1902. He was survived by his third wife, Lelia Coleman Walters. At the time of his death, his wife was employed as a clerk for the United States Bureau of Immigration on Ellis Island. The couple's son, Hillis Walters (1904–1984), was an actor during the Harlem Renaissance in the 1920s and 1930s and, later, a composer. His most successful composition was the song "Pass Me By" (1946), with lyrics by Mercer Ellington. It was recorded by Lena Horne, Carmen McRae and Peggy Lee. Bishop Walters is buried in Brooklyn, New York, in Mother Zion's Cypress Hills Cemetery.
