= 1912 Democratic Party presidential primaries =

- March 19 to June 4, 1912

1,088 delegates to the 1912 Democratic National Convention 726 (two-thirds) votes needed to win
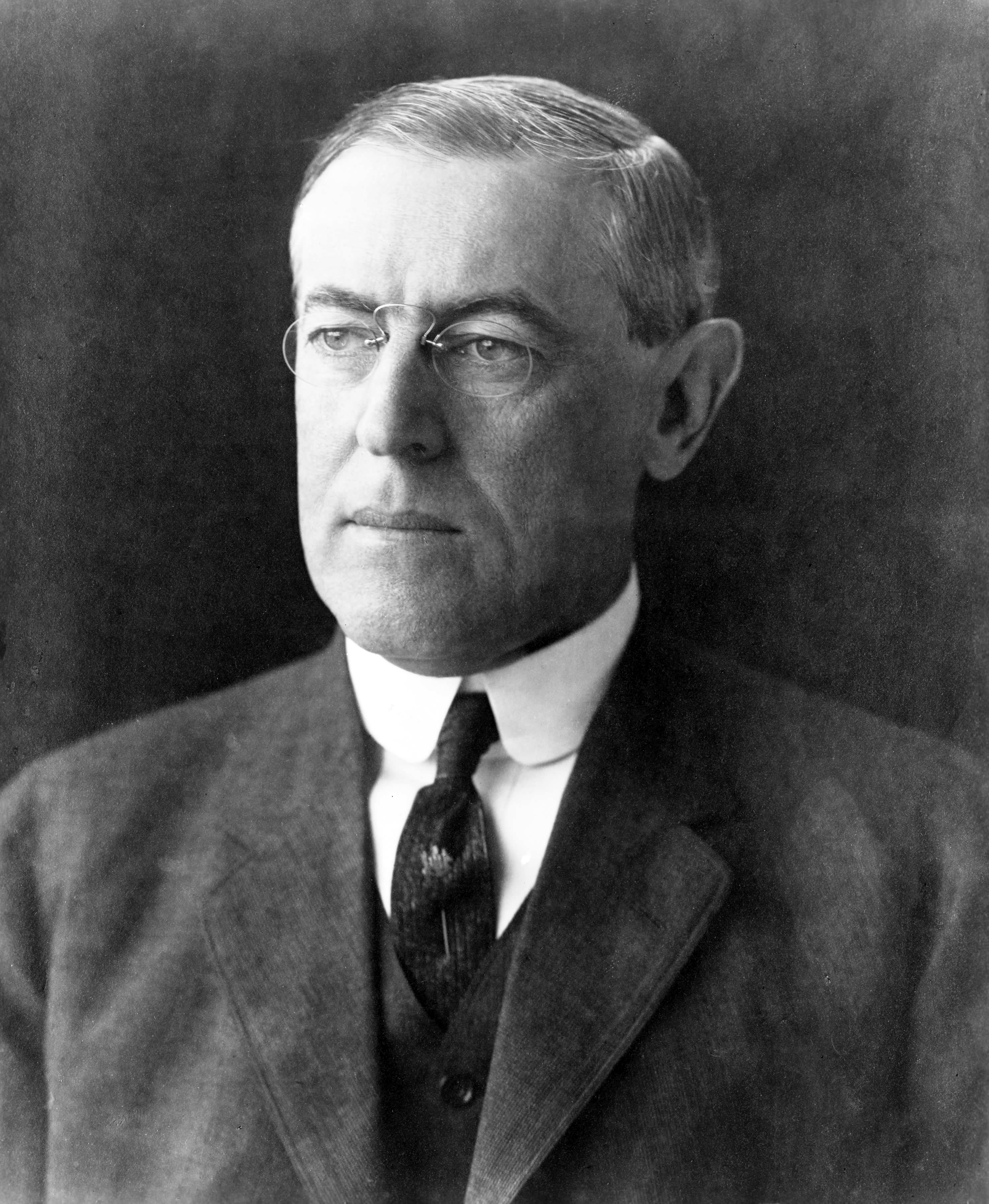

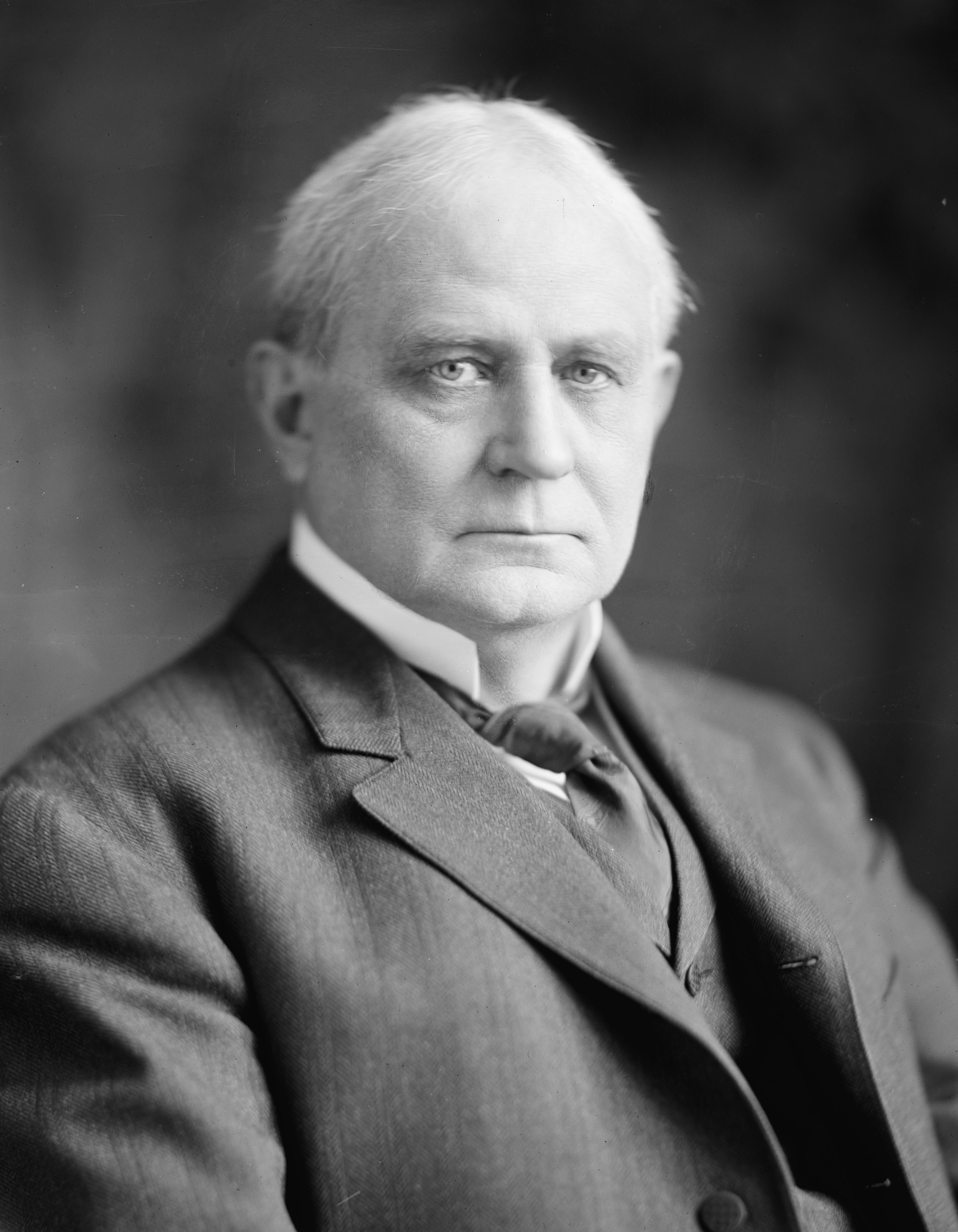

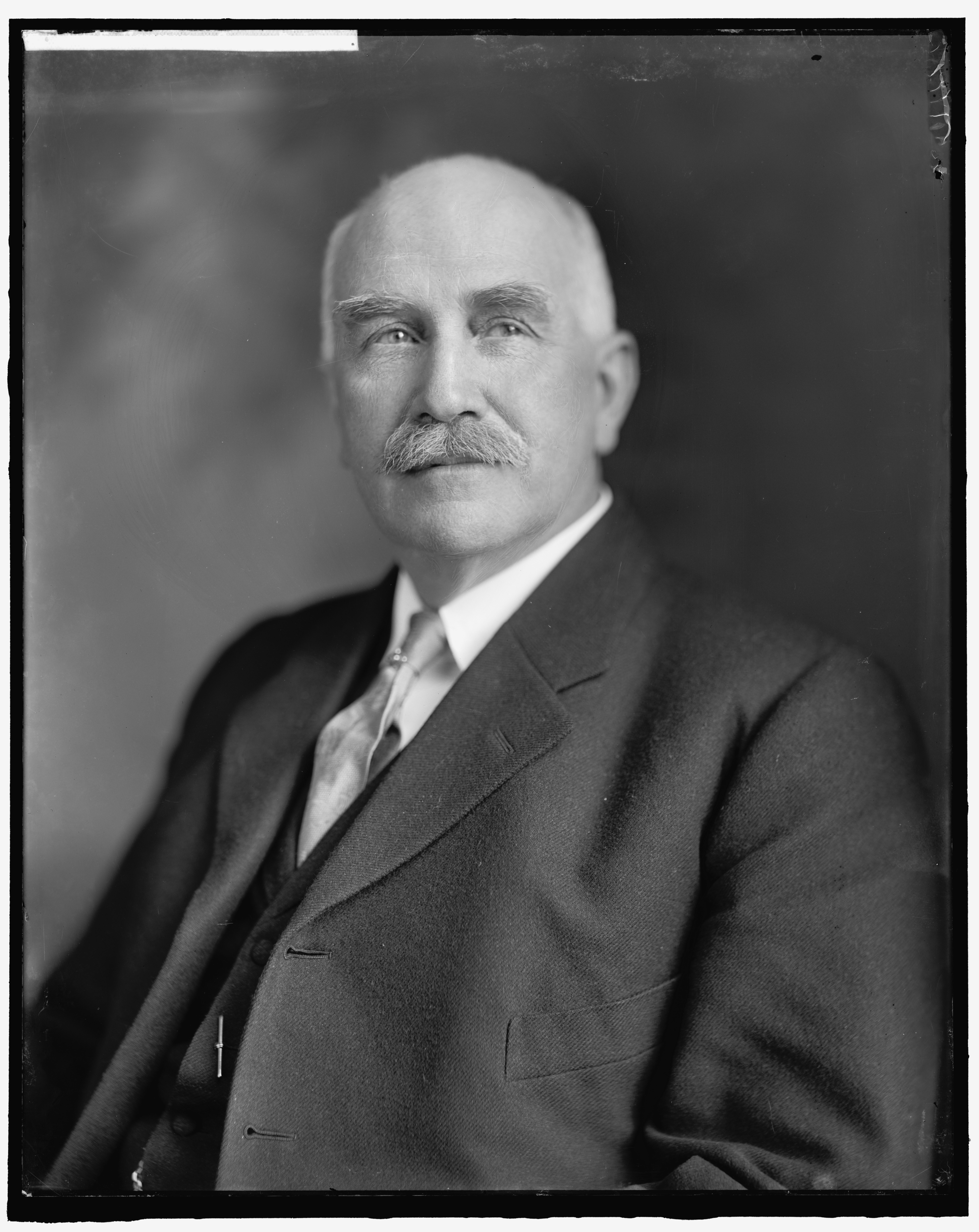

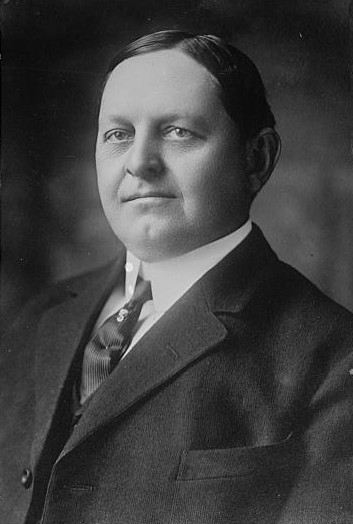
Candidate	Woodrow Wilson	Champ Clark
Home state	New Jersey	Missouri
Delegate count	324	440.5
Contests won	5	5
Popular vote	435,169	405,537
Percentage	44.6%	41.6%
Candidate	Judson Harmon	Oscar Underwood
Home state	Ohio	Alabama
Delegate count	148	117.5
Contests won	1	–
Popular vote	116,294	–
Percentage	11.9%	–
- Wilson Clark Underwood; Harmon Baldwin Various (Note: Favorite sons received the support of Indiana (Thomas R. Marshall) and North Dakota (John Burke).)
Previous Democratic nominee
William Jennings Bryan
Democratic nominee
Woodrow Wilson

From March 19 to June 4, 1912, voters of the Democratic Party elected delegates to the 1912 Democratic National Convention for the purpose of choosing a nominee for president in the 1912 election.

The primaries were inconclusive, with Speaker of the House Champ Clark holding a lead over Woodrow Wilson, but neither candidate close to the two-thirds of the delegates necessary to secure the nomination. In third place, Ohio governor Judson Harmon boasted the support of his home state and New York, the largest single delegation. House Majority Leader Oscar Underwood had strong support from the Deep South but little appeal outside the region.

At the convention, Wilson eventually secured the nomination over Clark after forty back-and-forth ballots.

== Candidates ==
=== Nominee ===
Candidate	Experience	Home state	Campaign	Popular vote	Contests won	Running mate
Woodrow Wilson	Governor of New Jersey (1910–1913); President of Princeton University (1902–1910)	New Jersey	(Campaign); Secured nomination: July 2, 1912	435,169 (44.6%)	[data missing]	Thomas R. Marshall

=== Defeated at convention ===
Candidate	Experience	Home state	Campaign	Popular vote	Contests won
Champ Clark	Speaker of the United States House of Representatives (1911–1919); Leader of the House Democratic Caucus (1909–1921); U.S. Representative from Missouri (1893–95, 1897–1921)	Missouri	(Campaign) Defeated at convention: July 2, 1912	405,537 (41.6%)	[data missing]
Judson Harmon	Governor of Ohio (1909–1913); United States Attorney General (1895–1897)	Ohio	(Campaign); Defeated at convention: July 2, 1912	116,294 (11.9%)	[data missing]
Oscar Underwood	House Majority Leader (1911–1915); House Minority Whip (1899–1901); U.S. Representative from Alabama (1895–96, 1897–1915)	Alabama	(Campaign) Defeated at convention: July 2, 1912	—	[data missing]
Simeon E. Baldwin	Governor of Connecticut (1911–1915); Chief Justice of the Connecticut Supreme Court (1907–1910); Associate Justice of the Connecticut Supreme Court (1897–1907)	Connecticut	Withdrew at convention	—	[data missing]

=== Favorite sons ===
- John Burke, Governor of North Dakota (endorsed Wilson)
- Thomas R. Marshall, Governor of Indiana

== Results ==
=== Total ===
Candidate	Votes	%
Woodrow Wilson	435,169	44.64
Champ Clark	405,537	41.60
Judson Harmon	116,294	11.93
John Burke	9,357	0.96
Others	8,418	0.86
Total	974,775	100.00

=== By state ===
State	Date	Woodrow Wilson	Champ Clark	Judson Harmon	John Burke	Others
North Dakota	March 19	N/A	N/A	N/A	100.0% 9,357	N/A
Wisconsin	April 2	55.7% 45,945	44.2% 36,464	N/A	N/A	0.2% 148
Illinois	April 9	25.7; 75,527	74.3% 218,483	N/A	N/A	N/A
Pennsylvania	April 13	100.0% 98,000 (Note: "Unofficial" figure)	N/A	N/A	N/A	N/A
Nebraska	April 19	27.9% 14,289	41.0% 21,027	24.3% 12,454	N/A	6.8% 3,499
Oregon	April 19	53.0% 9,588	43.4% 7,857	3.3% 606	N/A	0.3% 49
Massachusetts	April 30	29.9% 15,002	68.9% 34,575	N/A	N/A	1.2% 627
Maryland	May 6	34.3% 21,490	54.4% 34,021	11.3% 7,070	N/A	N/A
California	May 14	28.5% 17,214	71.5% 43,163	N/A	N/A	N/A
Ohio	May 21	45.7% 85,084	1.3% 2,428	51.7% 96,164	N/A	1.3% 2,440
New Jersey	May 28	98.9% 48,336	1.1% 522 (Note: Write-in candidate)	N/A	N/A	N/A
South Dakota	June 4	35.2% 4,694	32.0% 4,275; 20.4% 2,722 (Note: The pro-Clark vote was split between two slates of delegates. The first one, labeled "Wilson-Clark-Bryan" received 32% while the second one, labeled "Champ Clark" received 20%. Clark's people accused the latter slate of being a scheme to split the vote.)	N/A	N/A	12.4% 1,655

Legend:	1st place (popular vote)	2nd place (popular vote)	3rd place (popular vote)

== Endorsements ==
List of Woodrow Wilson endorsements

Former Democratic presidential candidates

- William Jennings Bryan, Democratic nominee for president in 1896, 1900, and 1908
List of Champ Clark endorsements

Former Democratic presidential candidates

- William Jennings Bryan, Democratic nominee for president in 1896, 1900, and 1908
List of Judson Harmon endorsements

Statewide officials

- Hugh L. Nichols, Lieutenant Governor of Ohio and Harmon's national campaign manager

== See also ==
- Republican Party presidential primaries, 1912
- White primary
