= 1912 Democratic National Convention =

American presidential nominating convention

- 1912 presidential election
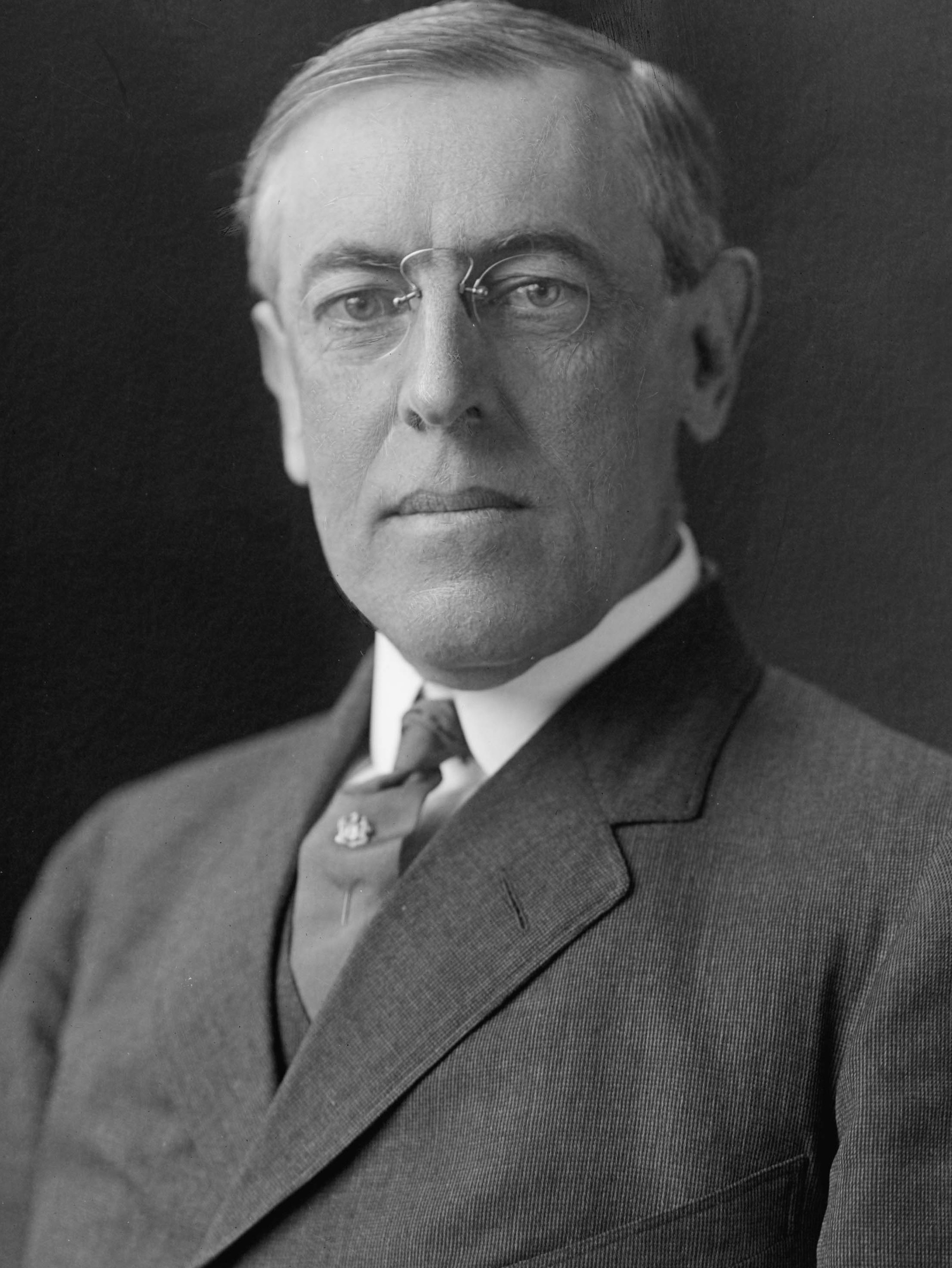
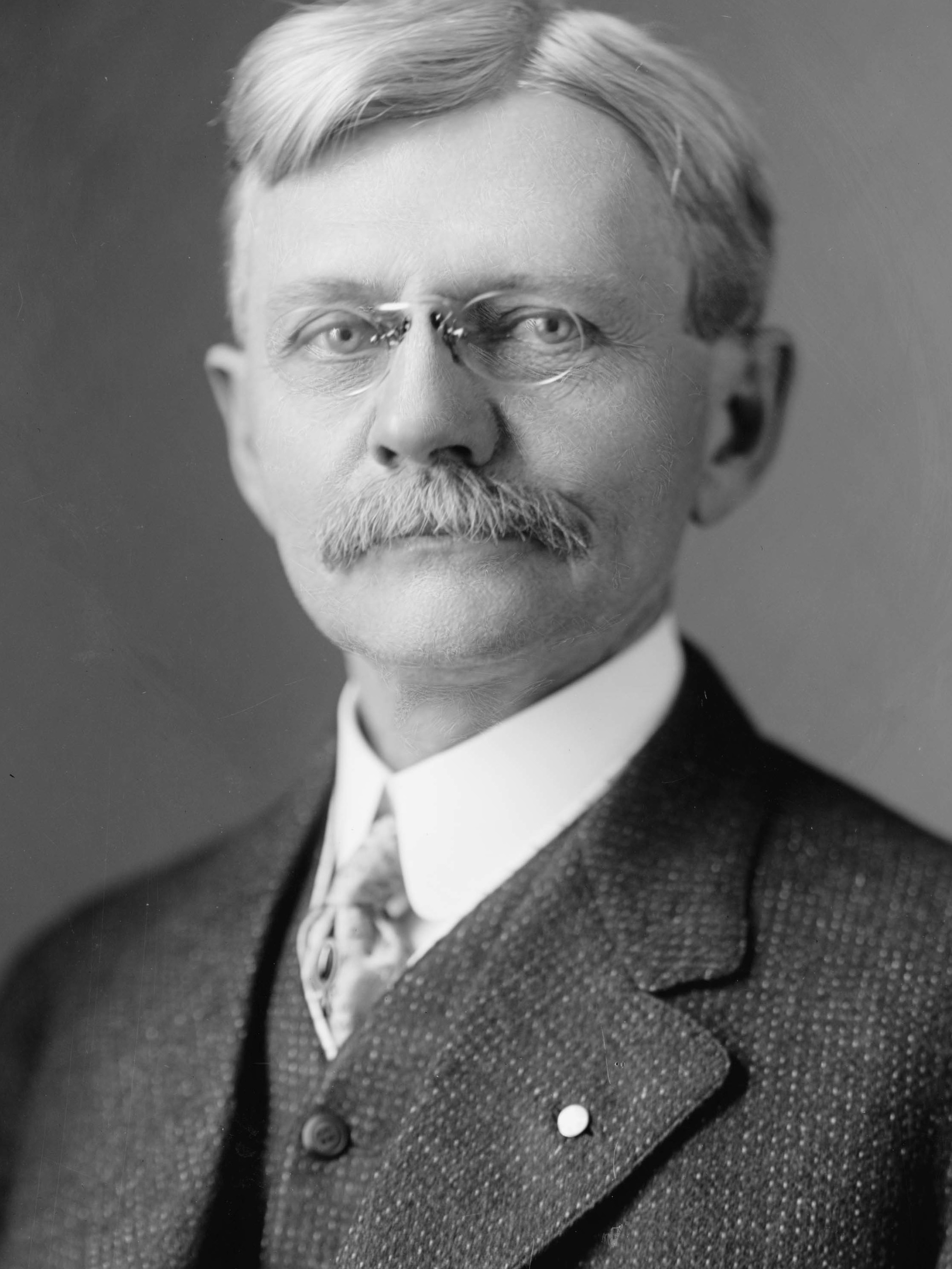
- Nominees; Wilson and Marshall

Convention
- Dates: June 25 – July 2, 1912
- City: Baltimore, Maryland
- Venue: Fifth Regiment Armory
- Chair: Ollie Murray James of Kentucky
- Keynote speaker: Alton B. Parker of New York

Candidates
- Presidential nominee: Woodrow Wilson of New Jersey
- Vice-presidential nominee: Thomas R. Marshall of Indiana

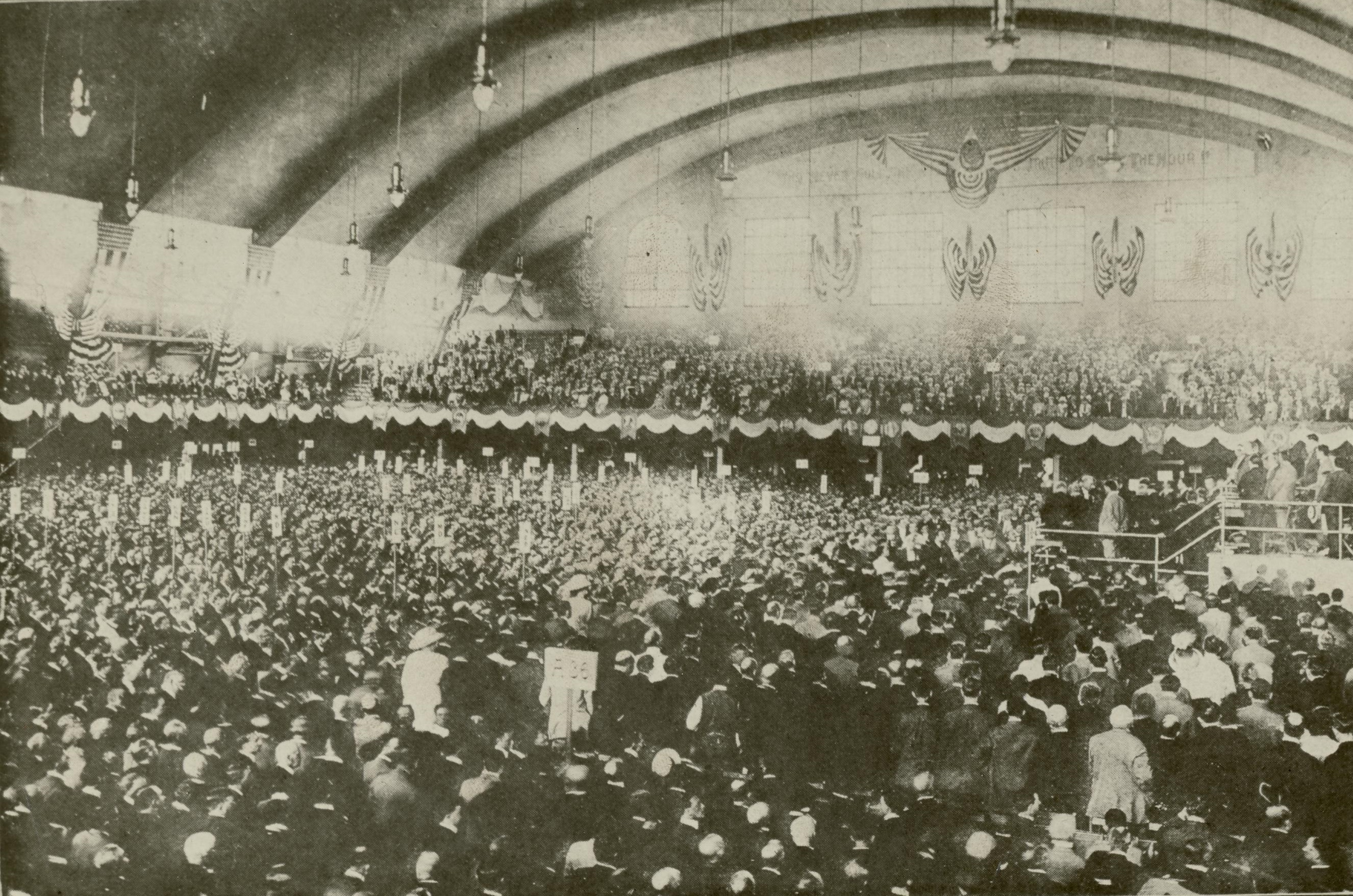
Convention in-session

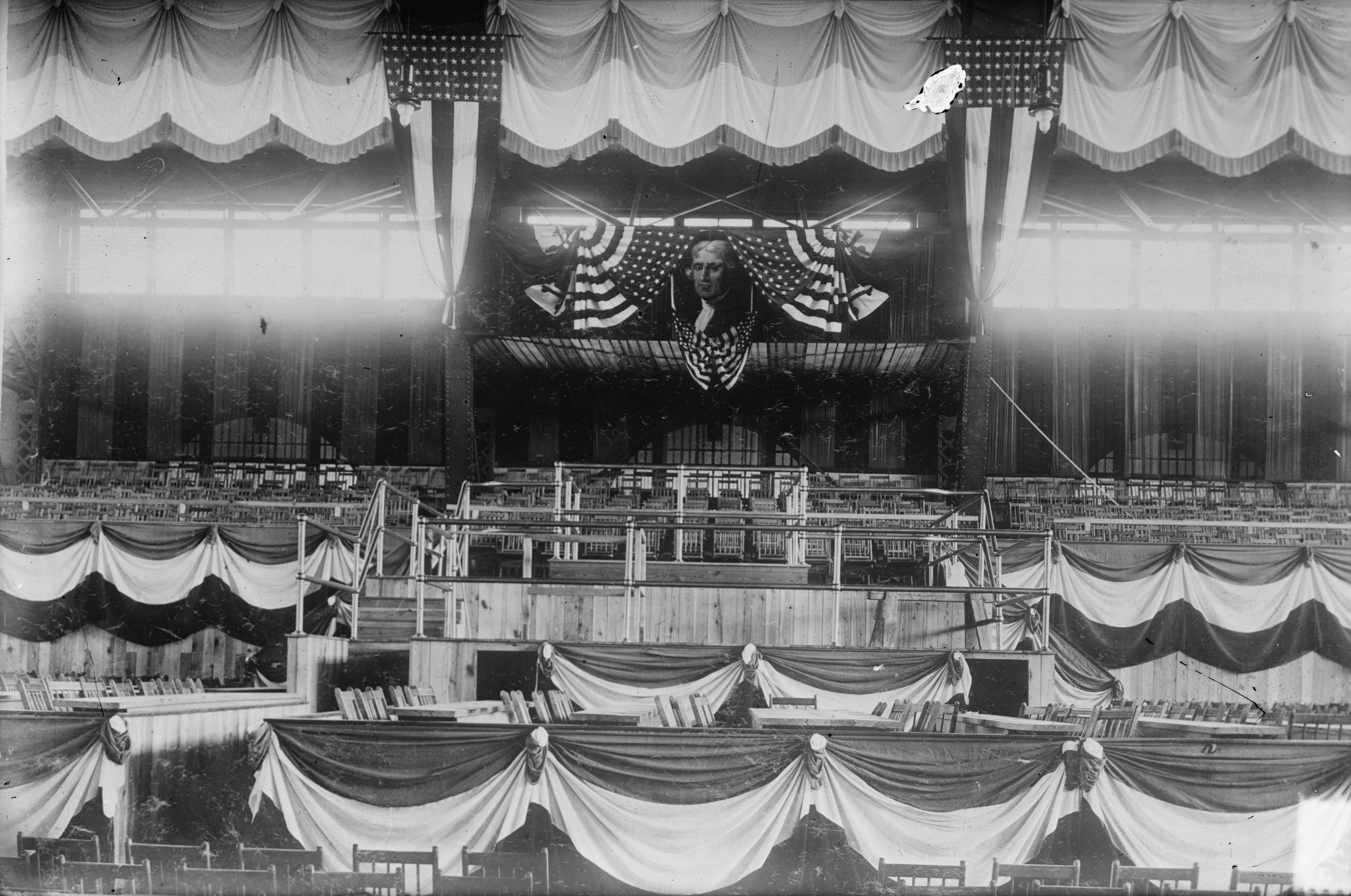
Armory decorated for the convention

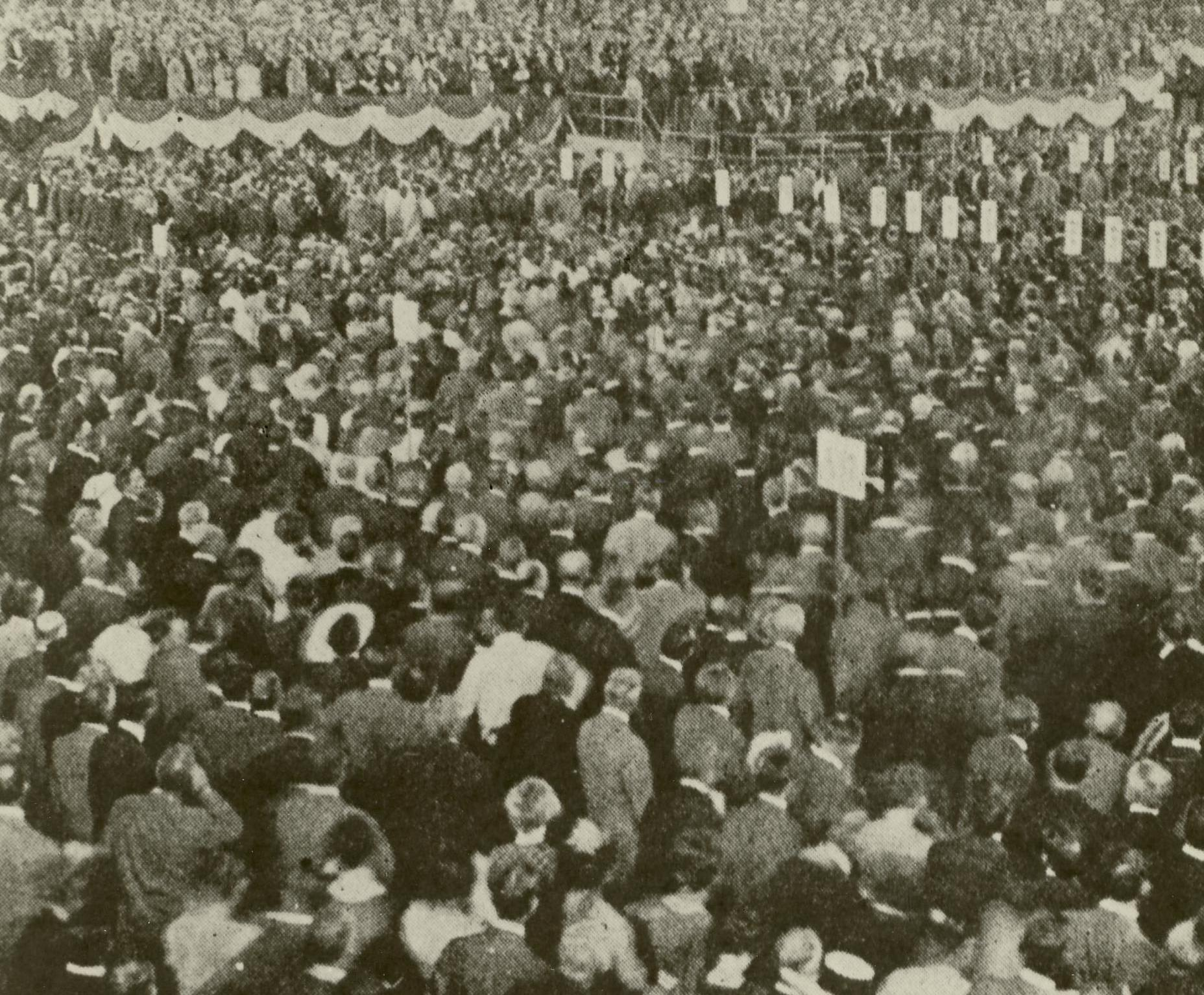
Delegates assembled on the convention floor

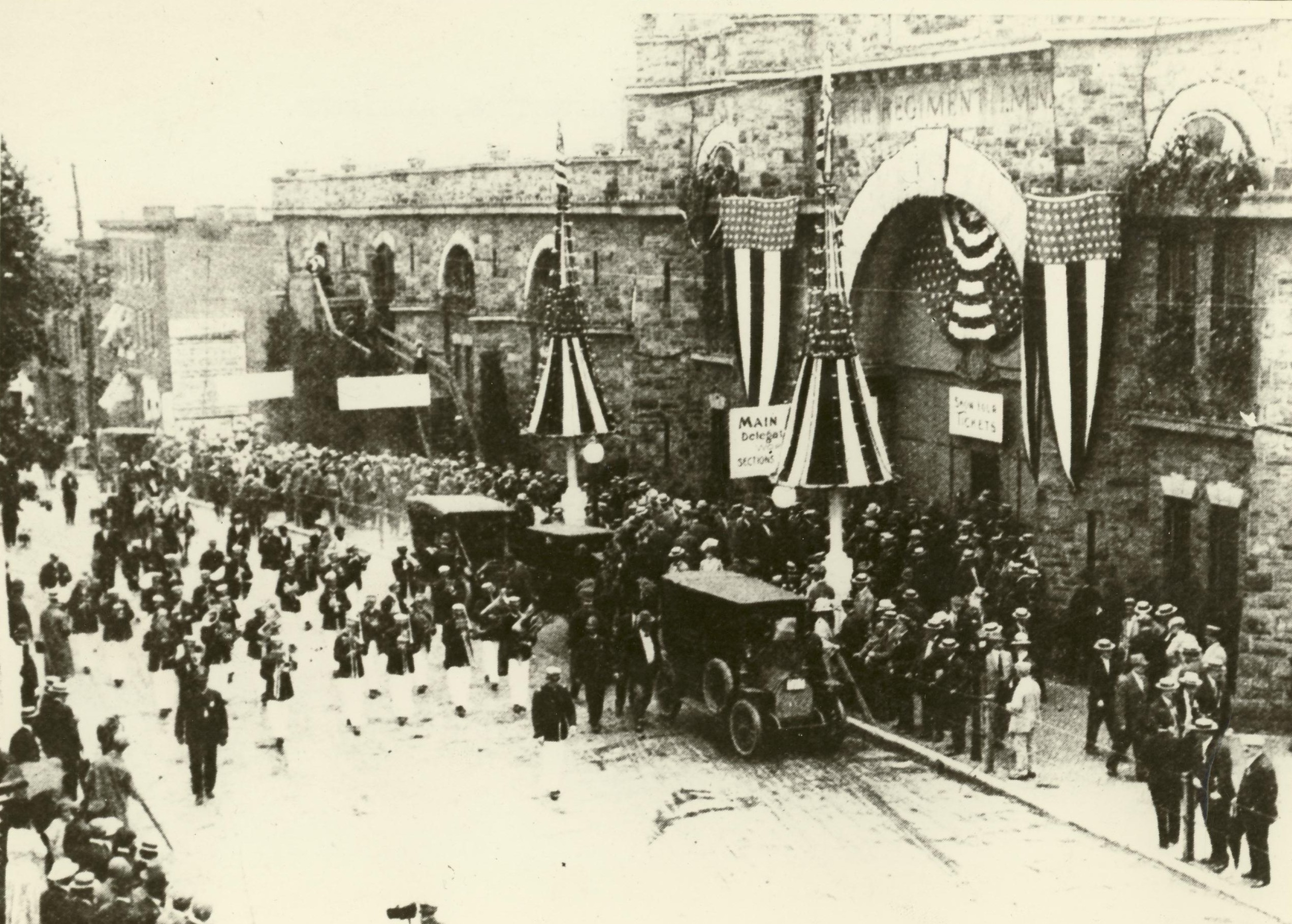
Scene outside the convention hall

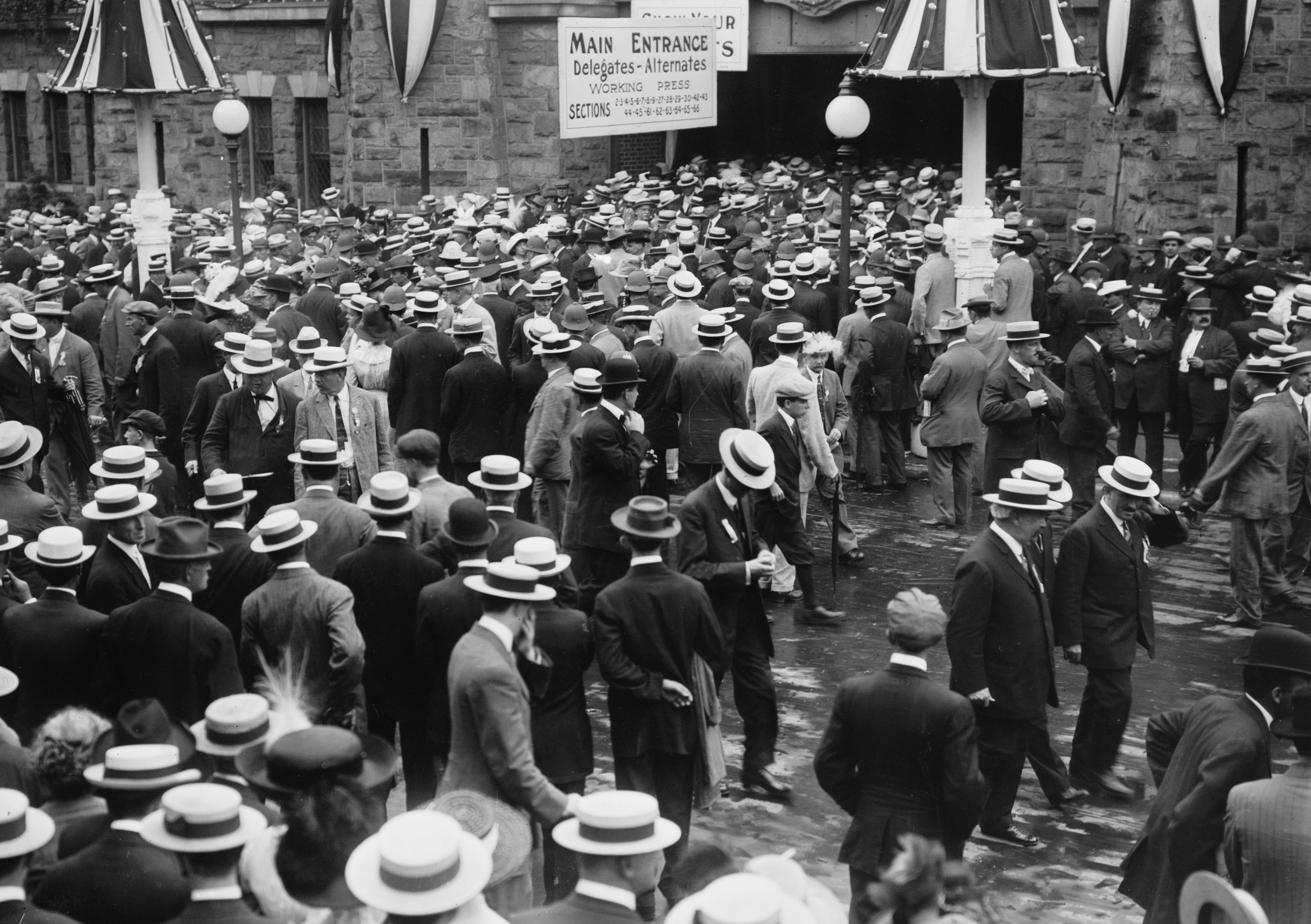
Attendees and delegates entering the convention hall

The 1912 Democratic National Convention was held at the Fifth Regiment Armory off North Howard Street in Baltimore from June 25 to July 2, 1912.

== The Convention ==
The convention was held at the Fifth Regiment Armory in Baltimore from June 25 to July 2, 1912. It proved to be one of the more memorable United States presidential conventions of the 20th century.

1904 presidential nominee Judge Alton B. Parker of New York served as the temporary chairman and keynote speaker. Representative Ollie M. James of Kentucky served as permanent convention chairman.

This was the latest major party convention to be held in Baltimore.

=== Presidential candidates ===
Governor Woodrow Wilson of New Jersey

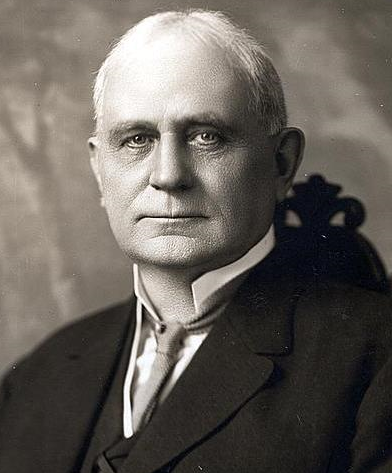
Speaker of the House Champ Clark of Missouri

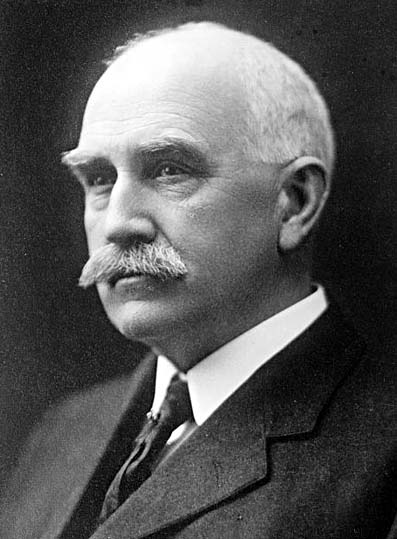
Governor Judson Harmon of Ohio

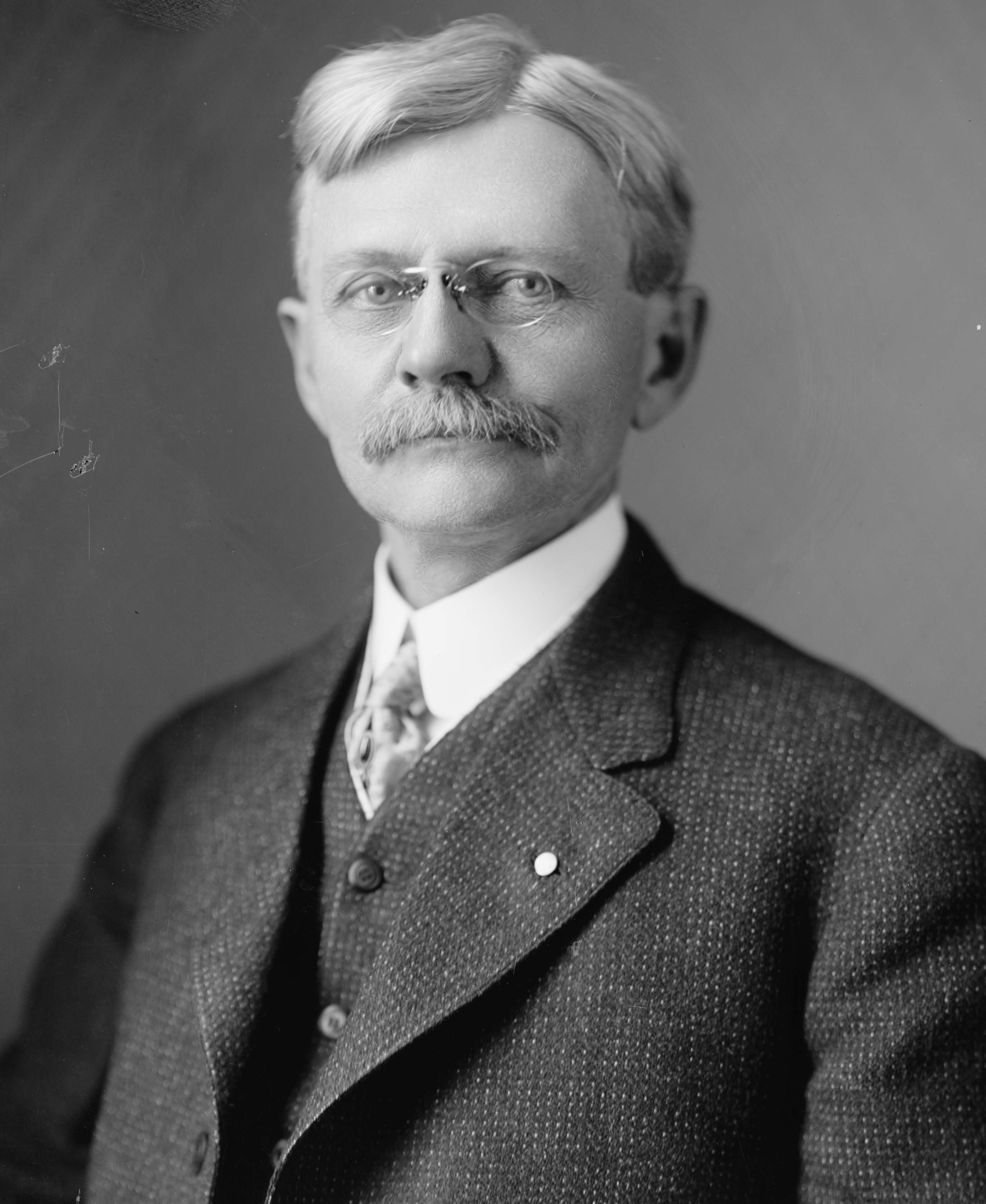
Governor Thomas R. Marshall of Indiana

Governor Simeon E. Baldwin of Connecticut

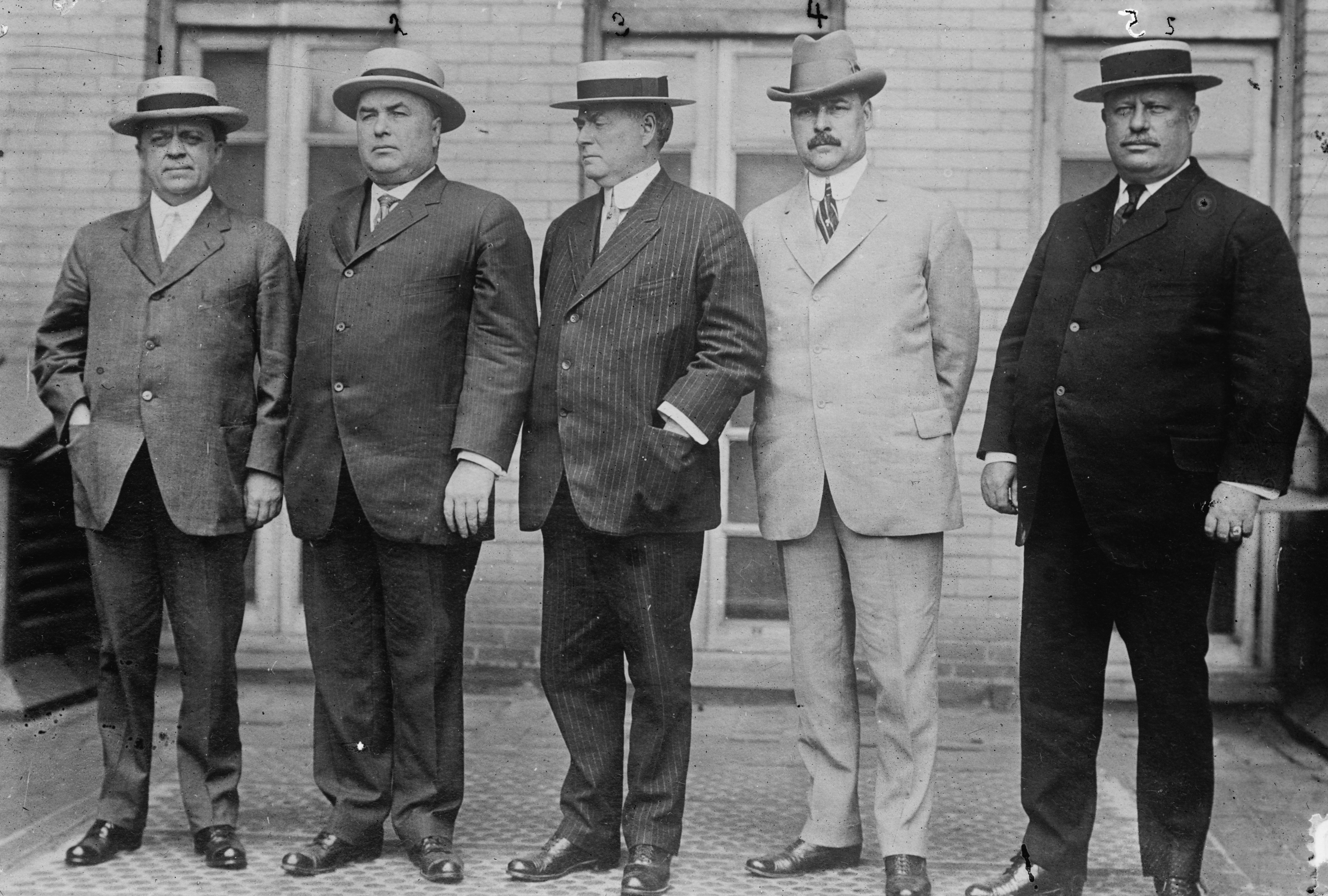
Urey Woodson, Roger Charles Sullivan, Norman E. Mack, Edwin Orin Wood, and Robert Crain at the convention

==== Withdrew during balloting ====
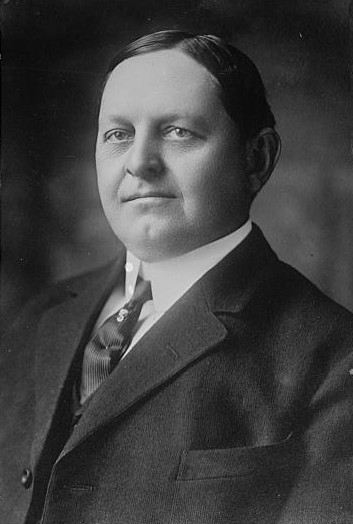
House Majority Leader Oscar Underwood of Alabama

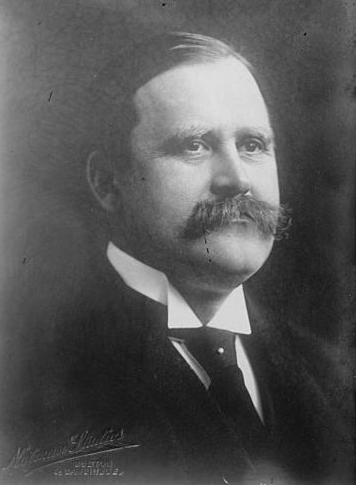
Governor Eugene Foss of Massachusetts

==== Declined ====
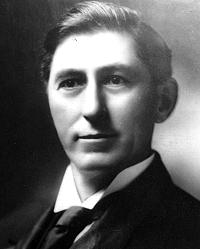
Governor John Burke of North Dakota

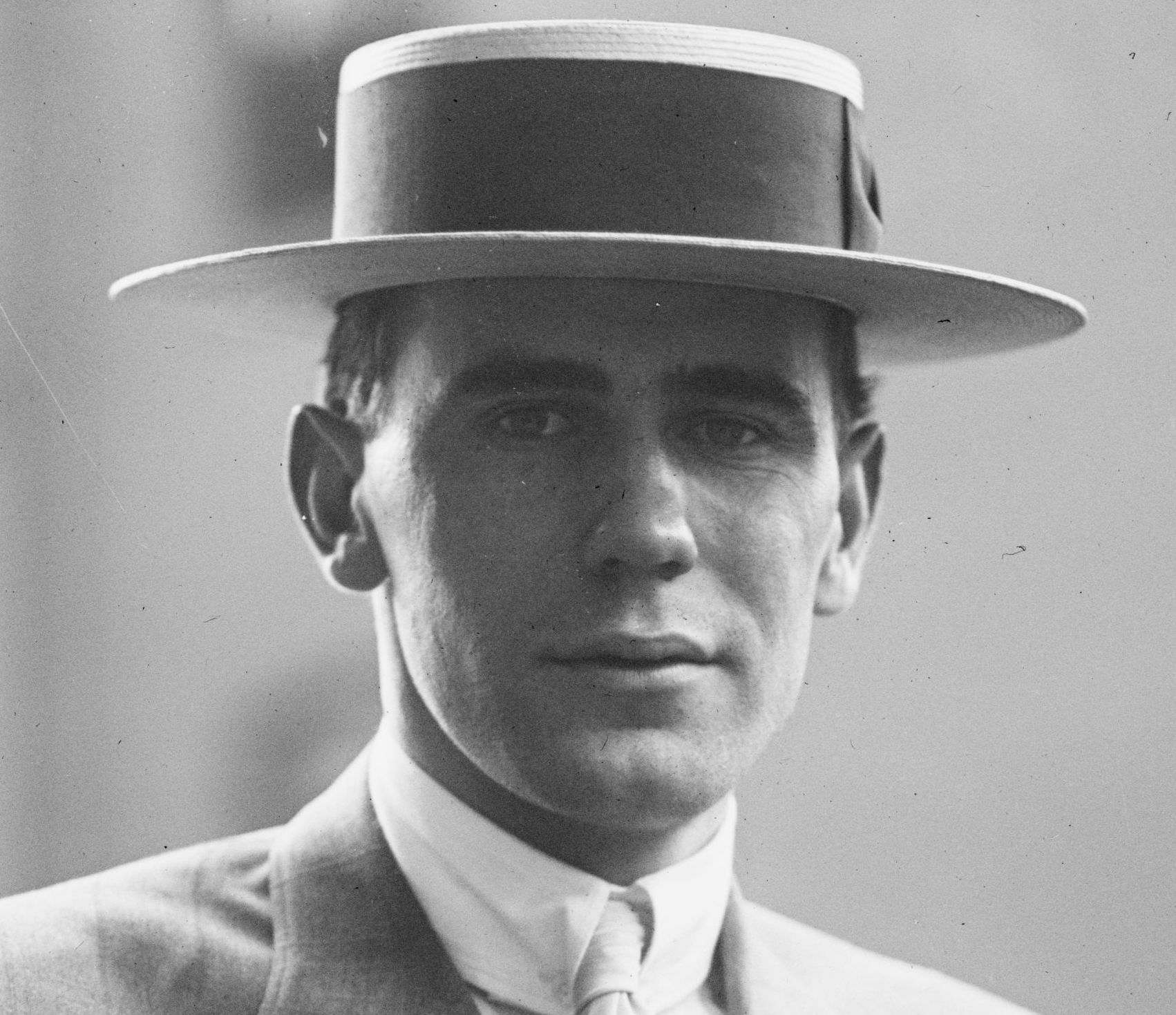
Joel Bennett Clark at the convention. His father, Champ Clark, initially appeared to be the frontrunner for the nomination.

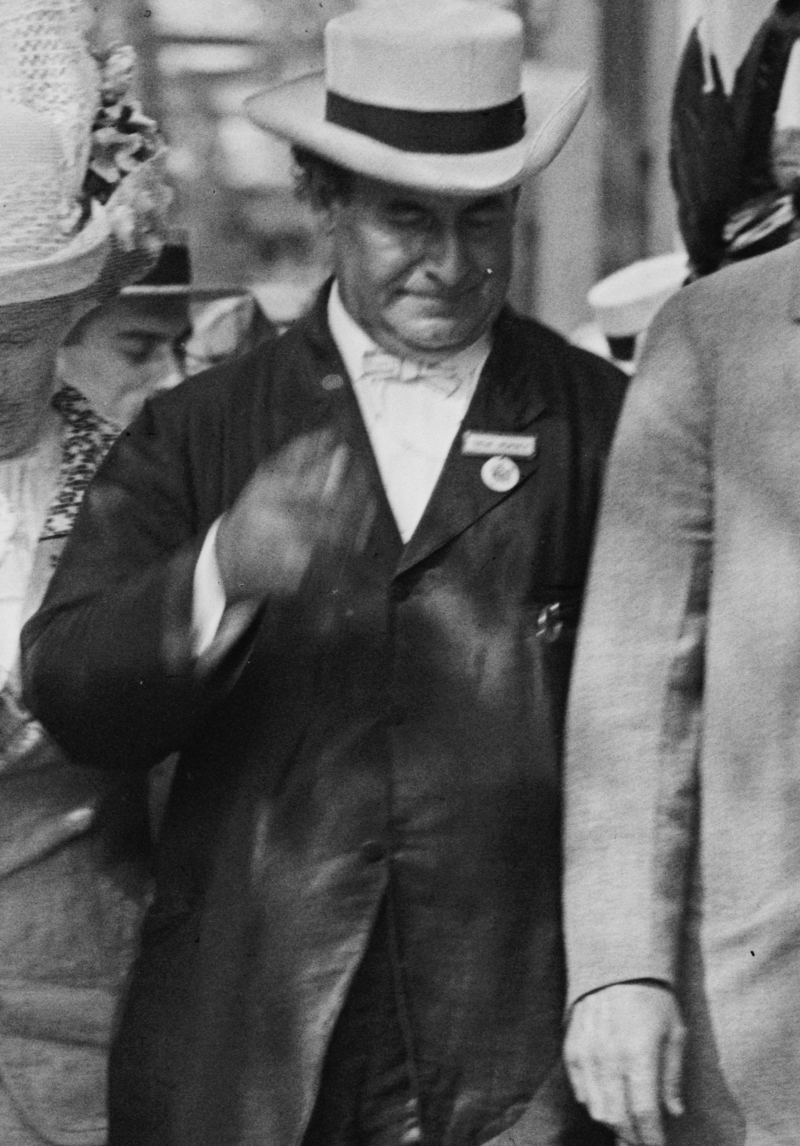
William Jennings Bryan attending the convention. Bryan's speech against Champ Clark and endorsement of Woodrow Wilson would ultimately affect the outcome of the nomination.

The main candidates were House Speaker Champ Clark of Missouri and Governor Woodrow Wilson of New Jersey. Both Clark and Wilson had won a number of primaries, and Clark entered the convention with more pledged delegates than did Wilson. However, he lacked the two-thirds vote necessary to secure the presidential nomination.

Initially, the front runner appeared to be Clark, who received 440¼ votes on the first ballot to 324 for Wilson. Governor Judson Harmon of Ohio received 148 votes while U.S. Representative Oscar W. Underwood of Alabama, the Chairman of the House Ways and Means Committee, received 117¼ with the rest of the votes scattered among the other delegates. No candidate managed to gain a majority until the ninth ballot, when the New York delegation shifted its allegiance to Clark. Due to the then-official two-thirds rule used by the Democratic Party, Clark was never able to secure the presidential nomination as he failed to get the necessary two-thirds vote for victory.

C. Vann Woodward stated that the 1912 Democratic nomination was "the first in half a century in which the South played a conspicuous and perhaps even decisive part". Earl Black and Merle Black stated that Underwood was the first southerner following the Civil War to seriously seek the Democratic nomination. Clark was able to gain a majority of the delegate vote, but lacked support in the south which prevented him from passing the two-thirds requirement.

In past conventions, once a candidate received a majority of the votes, it would start a bandwagon rolling to the nomination. Clark's chances were hurt when Tammany Hall, the powerful and corrupt Democratic political machine in New York City, threw its support behind him. This was the move that gave Clark a majority on the ninth ballot, but instead of propelling Clark's bandwagon towards victory, the endorsement led William Jennings Bryan to turn against the Speaker of the House. A three-time Democratic presidential candidate and still the leader of the party's liberals, Bryan delivered a speech denouncing Clark as the candidate of "Wall Street".

Up until the Tammany endorsement, Bryan had remained neutral, but once the corrupt machine put itself behind Clark, he threw his support to New Jersey Governor Woodrow Wilson, who was regarded as a moderate reformer.

Additionally Illinois Democratic Boss, Roger Charles Sullivan and Indiana Democratic Boss Thomas Taggart made a deal with a member of Wilson's campaign. In exchange for having Thomas R. Marshall be Wilson's running mate, Illinois and Indiana would put their support behind Wilson.

Before these events, Wilson had consistently finished second to Clark on each ballot, Ironically, Wilson had nearly given up hope that he could be nominated, and he was on the verge of having a concession speech read for him at the convention freeing his delegates to vote for someone else. After receiving the support of Bryan, Sullivan, and Taggart, Wilson gradually gained in strength while Clark's support dwindled. Wilson received the presidential nomination on the 46th ballot.

=== Presidential balloting ===
The 46 ballots were the most cast at a convention since 1860.

(1-22)	Presidential Ballot																							
	1st	2nd	3rd	4th	5th	6th	7th	8th	9th	10th	11th	12th	13th	14th	15th	16th	17th	18th	19th	20th	21st	22nd	23rd	24th
Wilson	324	339.75	345	349.5	351	354	352.5	351.5	352.5	350.5	354.5	354	356	361	362.5	362.5	362.5	361	358	388.5	395.5	396.5	399	402.5
Clark	440.5	446.5	441	443	443	445	449.5	448.5	452	556	554	547.5	554.5	553	552	551	545	535	532	512	508	500.5	497.5	496
Harmon	148	141	140.5	136.5	141.5	135	129.5	130	127	31	29	29	29	29	29	29	29	29	29	29	29	0	0	0
Underwood	117.5	111.25	114.5	112	119.5	121	123.5	123	122.5	117.5	118.5	123	115.5	111	110.5	112.5	112.5	125	130	121.5	118.5	115	114.5	115.5
Foss	0	0	0	0	0	0	0	0	0	0	0	0	2	0	0	0	0	0	1	2	5	43	45	43
T. Marshall	31	31	31	31	31	31	31	31	31	31	30	30	30	30	30	30	30	30	30	30	30	30	30	30
Baldwin	22	14	14	14	0	0	0	0	0	0	0	0	0	0	0	0	0	0	0	0	0	0	0	0
W.J. Bryan	1	2	1	0	0	1	1	1	1	1	1	1	1	2	2	1	1	1	7	1	1	1	1	1
Kern	0	0	1	2	2	1	1	1	1	1	1	1	0	2	2	2	4.5	3.5	1	1	1	1	0	0
James	0	0	0	0	0	0	0	1	0	0	0	0	0	0	0	0	0	0	0	3	0	0	0	0
Sulzer	2	2	0	0	0	0	0	0	0	0	0	0	0	0	0	0	0	0	0	0	0	0	0	0
Gaynor	0	0	0	0	0	0	0	1	1	0	0	0	0	0	0	0	0	0	0	0	0	1	1	0
Lewis	0	0	0	0	0	0	0	0	0	0	0	0	0	0	0	0	0	0	0	0	0	0	0	0
Blank	2	0.5	0	0	0	0	0	0	0	0	0	2.5	0	0	0	0	3.5	3.5	0	0	0	0	0	0

(25–46)	Presidential Ballot																						
	25th	26th	27th	28th	29th	30th	31st	32nd	33rd	34th	35th	36th	37th	38th	39th	40th	41st	42nd	43rd	44th	45th	46th	Unanimous
Wilson	405	407.5	406.5	437.5	436	460	475.5	477.5	477.5	479.5	494.5	496.5	496.5	498.5	501.5	501.5	499.5	494	602	629	633	990	1,088
Clark	469	463.5	469	468.5	468.5	455	446.5	446.5	447.5	447.5	433.5	434.5	432.5	425	422	423	424	430	329	306	306	84	
Harmon	29	29	29	29	29	19	17	14	29	29	29	29	29	29	29	28	27	27	28	27	25	12	
Underwood	108	112.5	112	112.5	112	121.5	116.5	119.5	103.5	101.5	101.5	98.5	100.5	106	106	106	106	104	98.5	99	97	0	
Foss	43	43	38	38	38	30	30	28	28	28	28	28	28	28	28	28	28	28	27	27	27	0	
T. Marshall	30	30	30	0	0	0	0	0	0	0	0	0	0	0	0	0	0	0	0	0	0	0	
Baldwin	0	0	0	0	0	0	0	0	0	0	0	0	0	0	0	0	0	0	0	0	0	0	
W.J. Bryan	1	1	1	1	0	0	0	0	0	0	0	0	0	0	0	0	1	0.5	1	0	0	0	
Kern	0	0	0	1	4	2	2	2	2	2	1	1	1	1	1	1	1	1	1	0	0	0	
James	3	0	0	0	0	0	0	0	0	0	0	0	0	0	0	0	0	1	0	0	0	0	
Sulzer	0	0	0	0	0	0	0	0	0	0	0	0	0	0	0	0	0	0	0	0	0	0	
Gaynor	0	0	0	0	0	0	0	0	0	0	0	0	0	0	0	0	1	1	0	0	0	0	
Lewis	0	0	0	0	0	0	0	0	0	0	0	0	0	0	0	0	0	1	0	0	0	0	
Blank	0	1.5	2.5	0.5	0.5	0.5	0.5	0.5	0.5	0.5	0.5	0.5	0.5	0.5	0.5	0.5	0.5	0.5	1.5	0	0	2	

==== Presidential balloting / 3rd day of Convention (June 27) ====
1st Ballot

==== Presidential balloting / 4th day of Convention (June 28) ====
2nd Ballot

3rd Ballot

4th Ballot

5th Ballot

6th Ballot

7th Ballot

8th Ballot

9th Ballot

10th Ballot

11th Ballot

12th Ballot

==== Presidential balloting / 5th day of Convention (June 29) ====
13th Ballot

14th Ballot

15th Ballot

16th Ballot

17th Ballot

18th Ballot

19th Ballot

20th Ballot

21st Ballot

22nd Ballot

23rd Ballot

24th Ballot

25th Ballot

26th Ballot

==== Presidential balloting / 6th day of Convention (July 1) ====
27th Ballot

28th Ballot

29th Ballot

30th Ballot

31st Ballot

32nd Ballot

33rd Ballot

34th Ballot

35th Ballot

36th Ballot

37th Ballot

38th Ballot

39th Ballot

40th Ballot

41st Ballot

42nd Ballot

==== Presidential balloting / 7th day of Convention (July 2) ====
43rd Ballot

44th Ballot

45th Ballot

46th Ballot

=== Vice presidential candidates ===
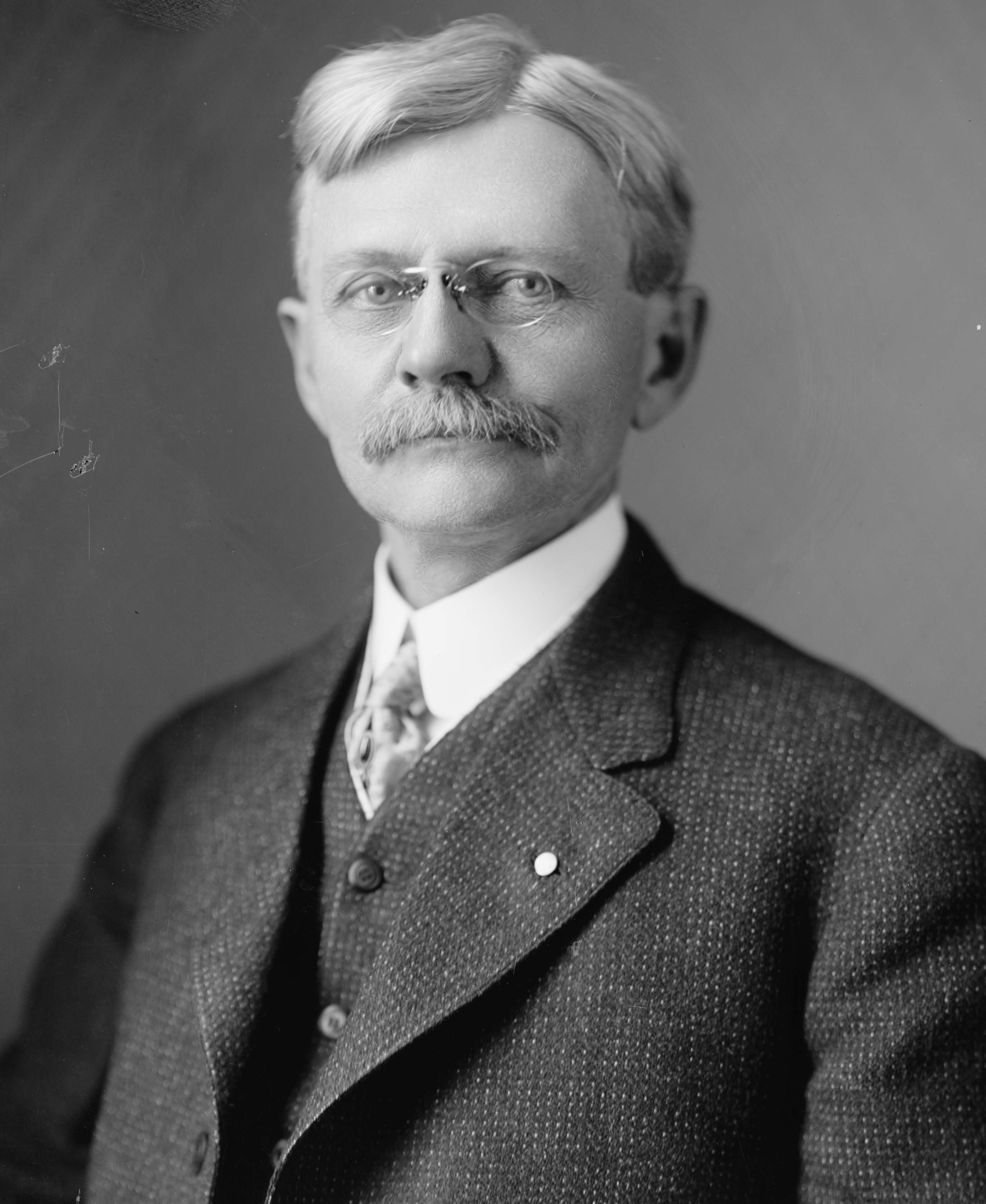
Governor Thomas R. Marshall of Indiana

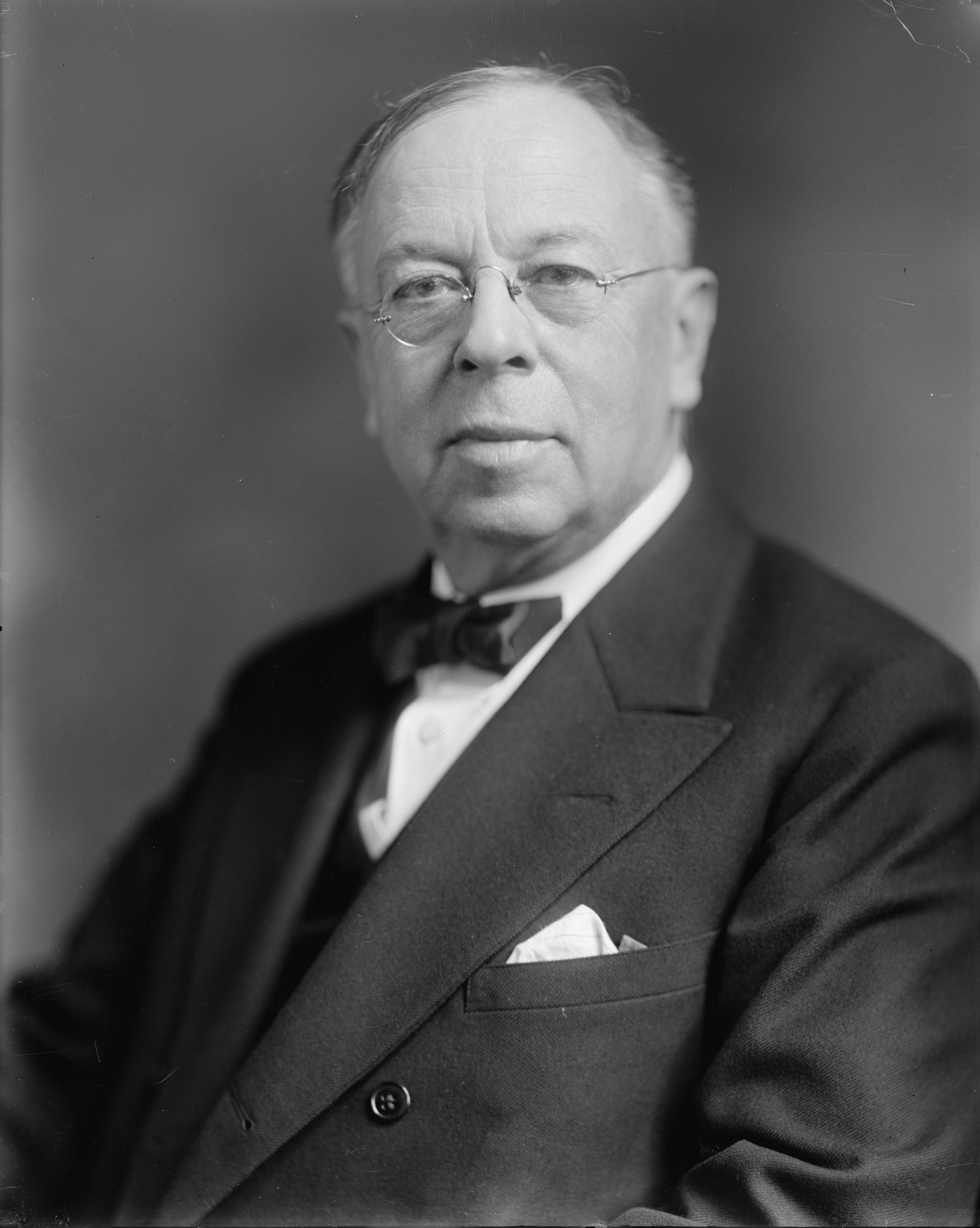
Senator George E. Chamberlain of Oregon

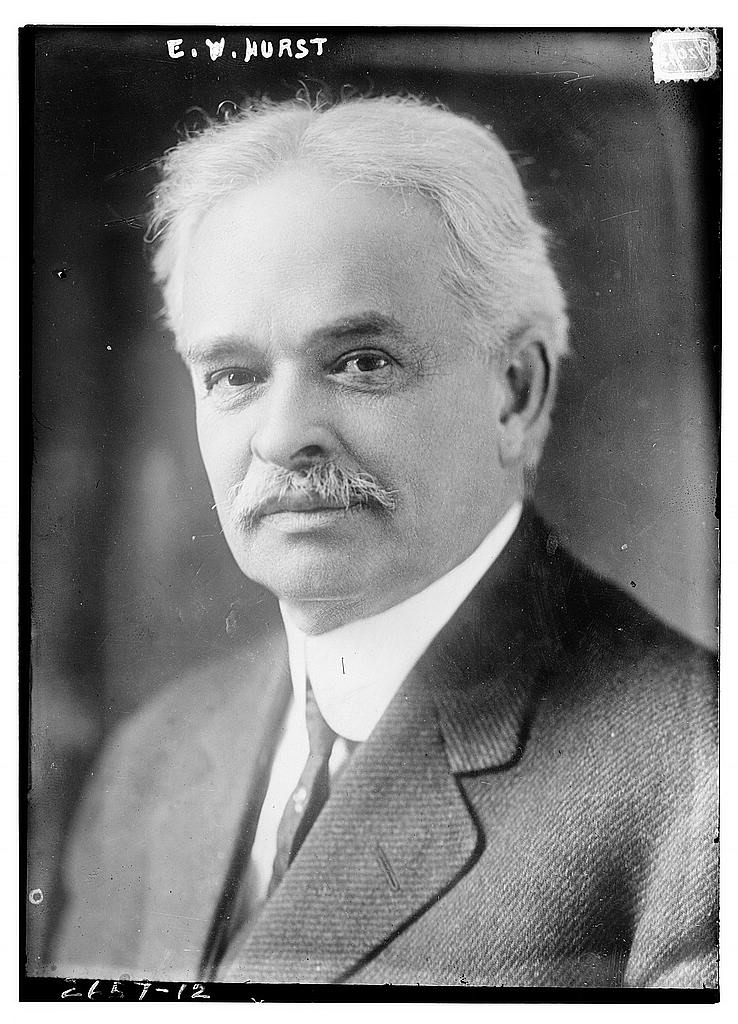
Former State Representative Elmore W. Hurst of Illinois

==== Withdrew during balloting ====
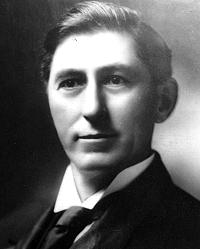
Governor John Burke of North Dakota

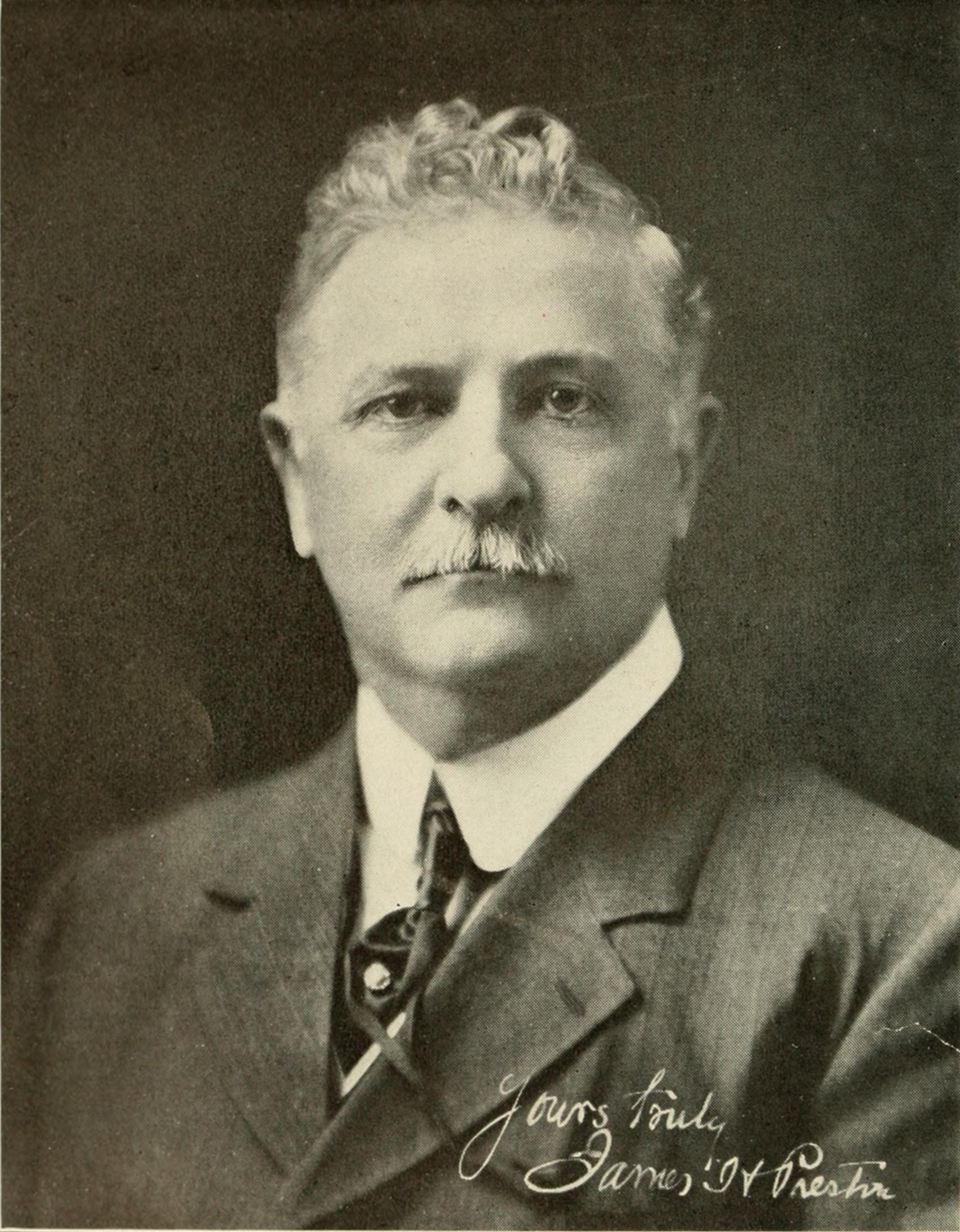
Mayor James H. Preston of Maryland

==== Declined ====
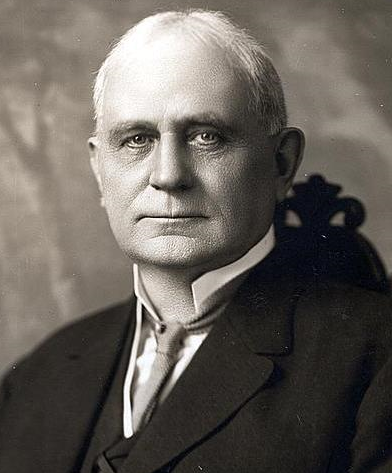
Speaker of the House Champ Clark of Missouri

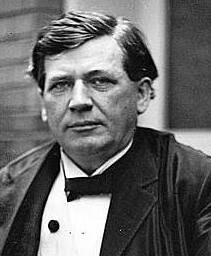
Former Representative Martin J. Wade of Iowa

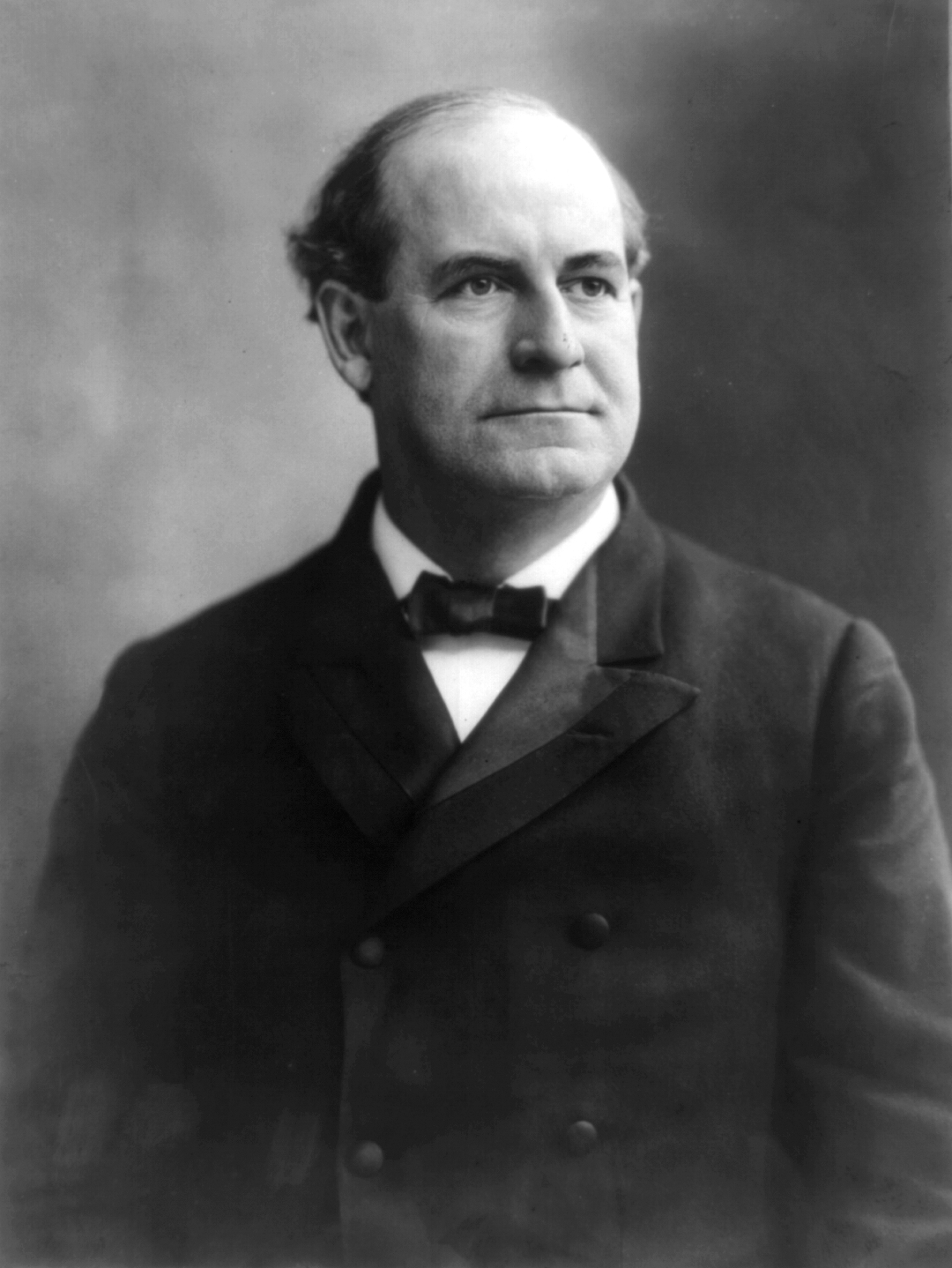
Former Representative William Jennings Bryan of Nebraska

Clark and Bryan were both proposed as vice presidential nominees, but both declined, with Clark preferring to remain as Speaker and Bryan fearful of overshadowing Wilson. Bryan instead proposed Oregon Senator George E. Chamberlain and North Dakota Governor John Burke, the latter of whom became the main progressive candidate. Governor Thomas R. Marshall of Indiana, who had swung his state's delegate votes to Wilson in later ballots, became the major candidate of conservatives. After the second ballot, Representative William Hughes, a leading campaign manager of Wilson's, successfully proposed making the nomination of Marshall unanimous. Wilson and Marshall went on to win the 1912 presidential election against a split Republican Party.

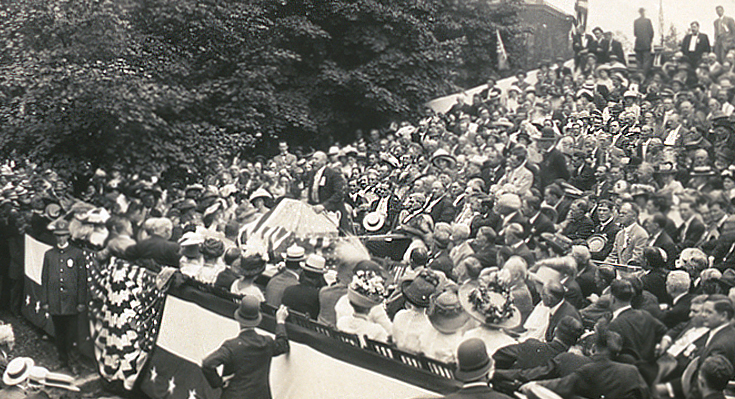
Thomas R. Marshall speaks to a crowd at a notification ceremony in Indianapolis after receiving news of his nomination

Vice Presidential Balloting
Candidate	1st	2nd	Unanimous
Marshall	389	644.50	1,088
Burke	304.67	386.33	
Chamberlain	157	12.50	
Hurst	78	0	
Preston	58	0	
Wade	26	0	
McCombs	18	0	
Osborne	8	0	
Sulzer	3	0	
Not Voting	46.33	44.67	
Not Represented	6	6	6

Vice presidential balloting / 7th day of Convention (July 2, 1912)

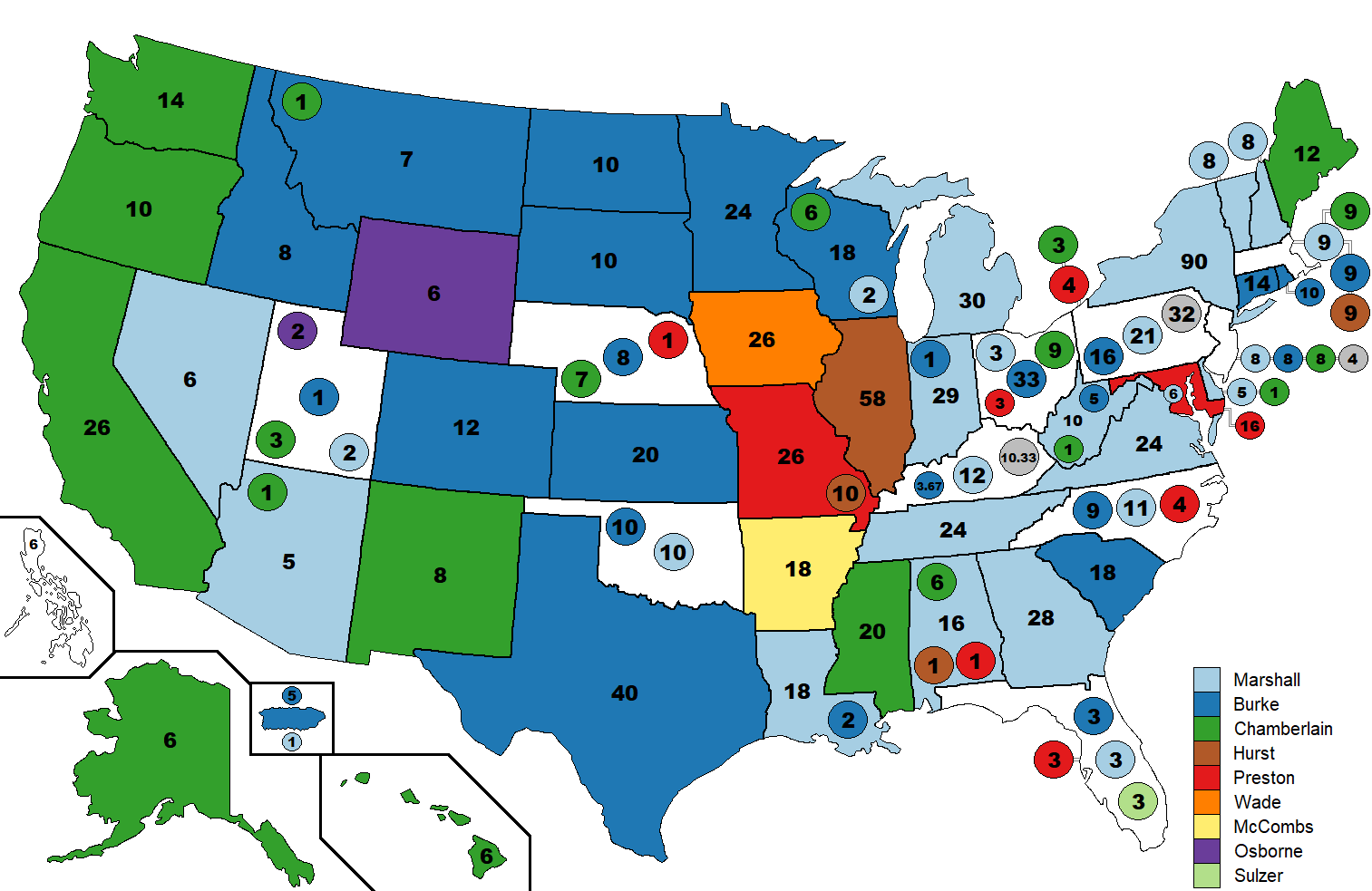
1st Vice Presidential Ballot

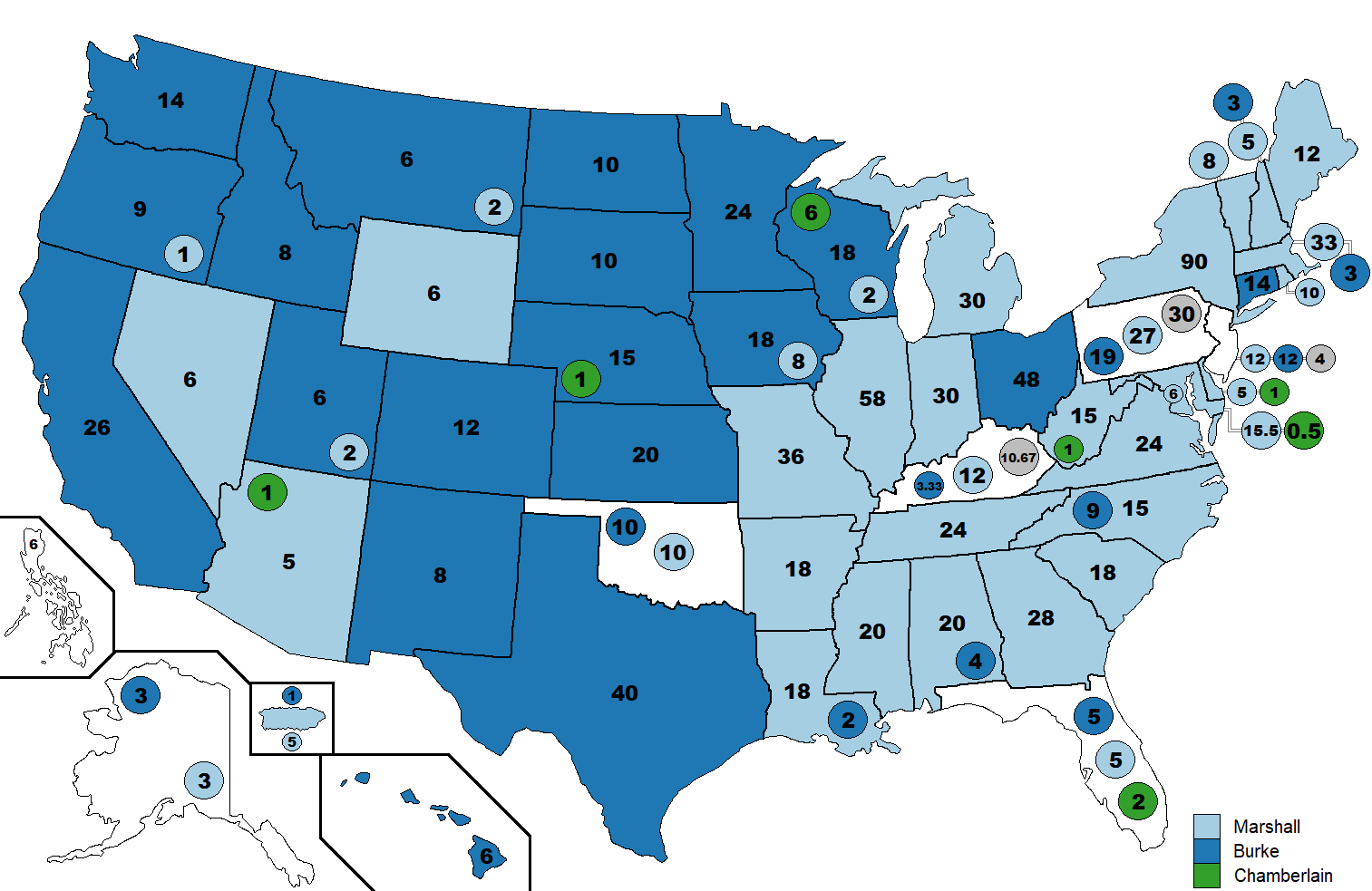
2nd Vice Presidential Ballot

== Delegates ==
John D. Harkless, commonly known as J. D. Harkless, was the first African American delegate to a Democratic National Convention. He was from Denver and an alternate delegate to the Democratic Party National Convention of 1912 in Baltimore, Maryland, that advanced Woodrow Wilson, then governor of New Jersey, to be the party's nominee. He was vice president of the National Negro Educational Congress. J. Milton Waldron and Harkless wrote The Political Situation in a Nut-shell; Some Un-colored Truths for Colored Voters published in 1912. It was anti-Republican.

Anna Pitzer was the only female delegate and also represented Colorado. She was the sister-in-law of Champ Clark, Speaker of the United States House of Representatives who was a candidate for the nomination.

== References in popular culture ==
The primary battles leading up to the 1912 Democratic Convention are a pivotal event in Taylor Caldwell's 1972 novel Captains and the Kings. In the novel, the fictional Irish-Catholic Rory Daniel Armagh, a U.S. Senator from Pennsylvania, emerges as the front-runner for the 1912 Democratic presidential nomination after beating Woodrow Wilson in multiple primaries. (Unlike in real life, Champ Clark is not a factor in the novel.) Armagh is assassinated as part of a conspiracy of international power brokers before the convention.

Scenes of the convention are depicted in the 1944 biographical film Wilson.

== See also ==
- 1912 Democratic Party presidential primaries
- History of the Democratic Party (United States)
- 1912 Republican National Convention
- 1912 United States presidential election
- Democratic National Convention

== Works cited ==
- Black, Earl; Black, Merle (1992). The Vital South: How Presidents Are Elected. Harvard University Press. ISBN 0674941306.

=== Bibliography ===
- Official report of the proceedings of the Democratic national convention, held in Baltimore, Maryland, June 25, 26, 27, 28, 29 and July 1 and 2, 1912
- William Jennings Bryan, Virgil V. McNitt. A Tale of Two Conventions. Funk & Wagnalls Company, 1912.

Preceded by 1908 Denver, Colorado	Democratic National Conventions; 1912	Succeeded by 1916 St. Louis, Missouri
