= J. Milton Waldron =

American clergyman and civil rights leader (1863–1931)

John Milton Waldron (May 19, 1863 – November 20, 1931) was a clergyman and civil rights leader in the United States. He led the NAACP's Washington D.C. branch.

He was born in Lynchburg, Virginia. He studied at Richmond Institute (now Virginia Union University) and then Lincoln University in Pennsylvania, graduating in 1886.

He led Bethel Baptist Church in Jacksonville, Florida from 1892 to 1907. He was also pastor of Shiloh Baptist Church in Washington D.C.

In 1910 he joined other ministers in a letter to U.S. president William Taft calling for action after the Slocum massacre. Eugene V. Debs wrote a public letter to him about the 1912 presidential election. He and J D Harkless wrote about the political situation in 1912.

Waldron married Martha Matthews in 1890. Together, Waldron and his wife had five children: George, Florence, James, Ella, and Blanch.

== Publications ==
- The Political Situation in a Nut-shell; Some Un-colored Truths for Colored Voters by John Milton Waldron and John D. Harkless (1912)
