= Philip A. White =

School board administrator

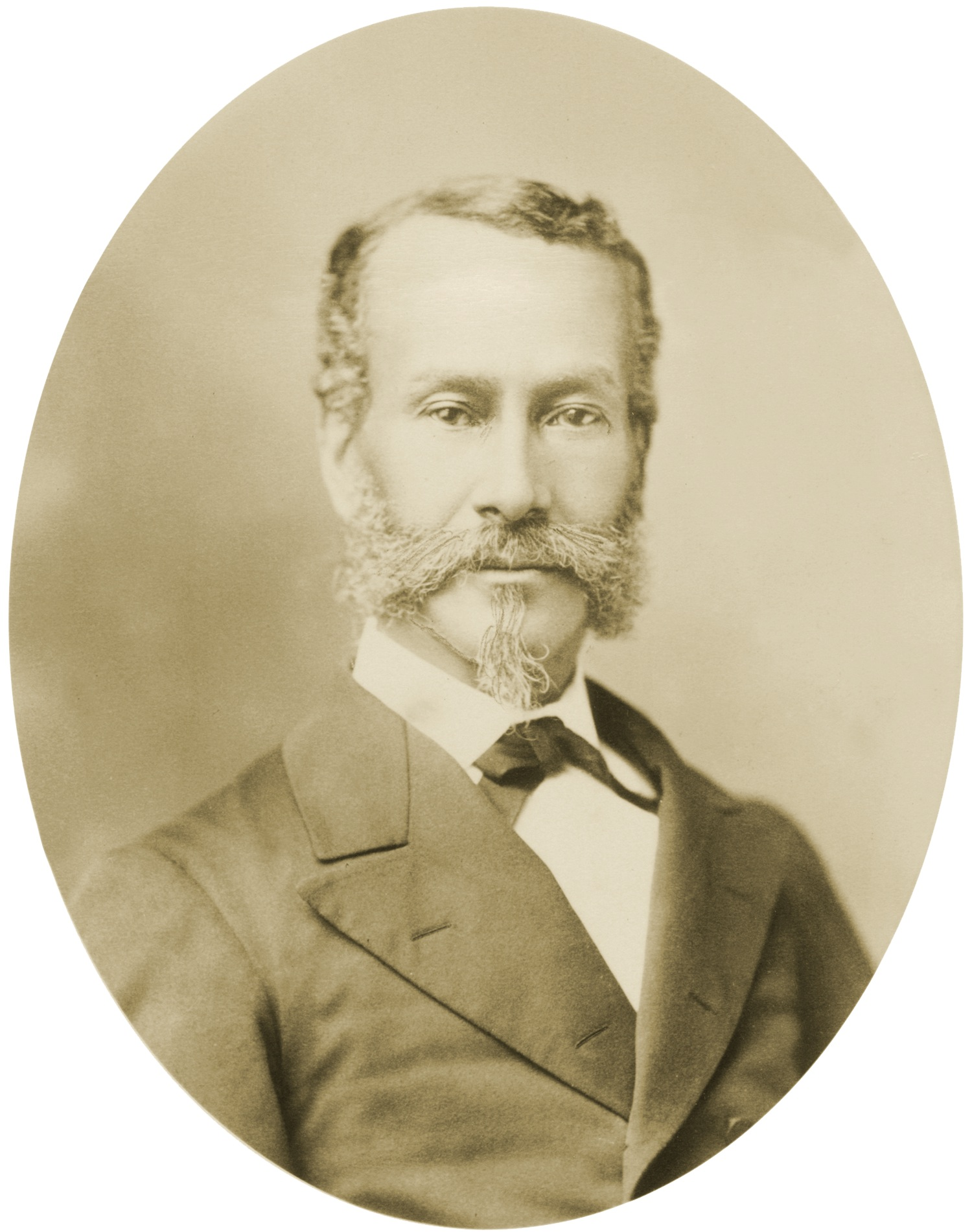
- Born: 1823
- Died: 1891 (aged 67–68)
- Education: New York College of Pharmacy
- Occupations: Pharmacist, aristocrat, advocate, school board administrator
- Spouse: Elizabeth Guignon
- Children: 3
- Relatives: Jerome B. Peterson (son in-law)

Philip Augustus White (1823–1891) was an American pharmacist, aristocrat, advocate, and school board administrator. He was the first to graduate from the College of Pharmacy of the City of New York in 1844 amid widespread racial barriers to professional education, the Secretary for the New York Society for the Promotion of Education Among Colored Children and the first African American member of the Brooklyn Board of Education.

== Life and career ==
White was born in Hoboken, New Jersey in 1823. He was one of six children. His mother, Elizabeth, was born in Jamaica and was of mixed white and black heritage. His father, Thomas, was a white Englishman. White was considered to be black according to the 'one drop rule' and identified as such.

The family moved to Manhattan when White was around eight years old. White's father died when he was twelve years old. White and his mother earned money by doing cleaning and maintenance for The Public School Society.

White attended the Laurens Street School (or Colored School No. 2), after which he apprenticed in James McCune Smith's Greenwich Village pharmacy. White graduated from the College of Pharmacy of the City of New York (or New York College of Pharmacy) in 1844. He was the first African American person to graduate from the college.

White opened a successful drug store and was admitted to professional pharmaceutical societies.

== Education advocacy ==
White advocated for the education of African Americans. He was secretary of the New York Society for the Promotion of Education Among Colored Children and a member of the New York African Society for Mutual Relief.

White was appointed to the Brooklyn Board of Education in 1882. He was the first African American person to sit on the board. During his term, he lobbied for integration of Brooklyn's schools.

== Personal life ==
White and his wife, Elizabeth Guignon, had three daughters. His daughter, Cornelia Steele White was married to Jerome B. Peterson, a noted newspaper editor and owner.

== See also ==
- Samuel R. Scottron, inventor and school board official in Brooklyn
