= Emanuel Fortune =

American politician (1833–1897)

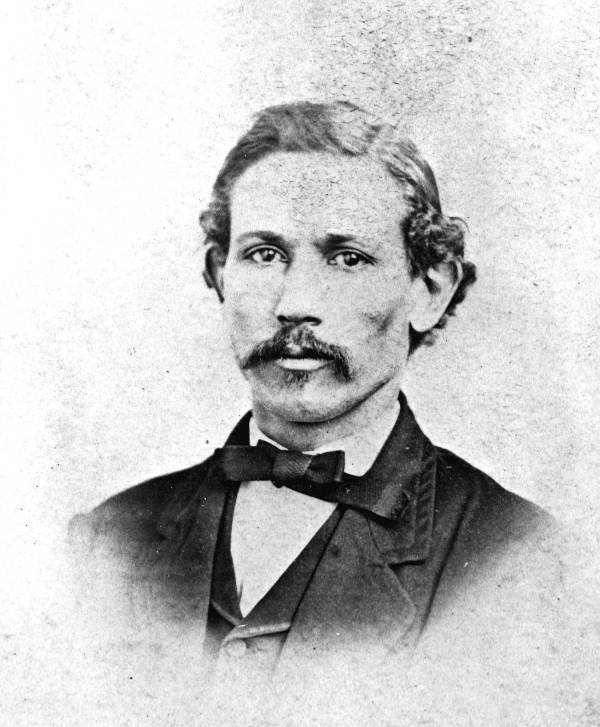

Member of the Florida House of Representatives from the Jackson County district
- In office 1868–1870

Personal details
- Born: January 3, 1833 near Marianna, Florida, U.S.
- Died: January 27, 1897 (aged 64)
- Resting place: Old City Cemetery
- Party: Republican
- Children: Timothy Thomas Fortune

Emanuel Fortune (January 3, 1833 – January 27, 1897) was an American shoemaker, farmer, and political leader. Emanuel was born to Dorah (Dora) Russ, the daughter of a mixed race enslaved woman and a Seminole Indian, and Thomas Fortune, an Irishman killed in a duel when Emmanuel was 6 months old. Emanuel represented Jackson County, Florida at the 1868 Florida Constitutional Convention and in the Florida House of Representatives before being forced to flee and re-establishing himself in Duval County, Florida, where he held several offices. He served in the Florida House of Representatives from 1868 to 1870.

Fortune was born into slavery in 1833 on the Russ Plantation near Marianna, Florida. Fortune worked as a shoemaker before entering politics. Fortune was an African Methodist Episcopal Church layman and was appointed to the county board of voter registration. Fortune married Sarah Jane Miers on June 5, 1866 The couple's son, Timothy Thomas Fortune, became a noted radical newspaper editor and activist for African American rights.

Fortune was elected to the 1868 Florida Constitutional Convention as one of four representatives for Jackson County. Fortune was forced to leave Jackson County because he believed his life was threatened by white supremacists and served the remainder of his elected term in Jacksonville.

In November 1871, Jackson testified at the United States Senate Select Committee on Outrages in Southern States, a special session of the 42nd United States Congress that investigated Ku Klux Klan violence in North Carolina and Florida. Jackson was questioned by the chairman of the committee, Henry Wilson, and Thomas F. Bayard. Fortune testified about the difficulty Black farmers had in obtaining small parcels of land and the racially motivated attacks and violence that he had witnessed.

Fortune is buried at the Old Jacksonville City Cemetery in Duval County, Florida.

A photograph of Fortune appears in Canter Brown Jr.'s book, Florida's Black Public Officials, 1867-1924.
