= Greason =

Greason is a surname. Notable people with the surname include:

- A. LeRoy Greason (1922–2011), the twelfth president of Bowdoin College
- Bill Greason (born 1924), retired American baseball player, became a Baptist minister
- Jeff Greason (fl. from 1998), founder of XCOR Aerospace, the Commercial Spaceflight Federation
- John Greason (1851–1889), American professional baseball player
- Murray Greason (1901–1960), American college basketball and baseball coach
- Thomas Greason (born 1970), Republican member of the Virginia House of Delegates
- Walter David Greason (fl. from 1991), American historian
