= Thomas Fortune =

Thomas Fortune may refer to:

- Thomas R. Fortune (1917–1986), American politician, member of the New York State Assembly
- T. Thomas Fortune (1856–1928), American journalist, newspaper publisher, orator, and civil rights activist

== See also ==
- Thomas Fortune Ryan (1851–928), American tobacco, insurance and transportation magnate
