= Walter David Greason =

American historian

Academic background
- Education: Villanova University (BA) Temple University (PhD)

Academic work
- Discipline: History
- Institutions: Monmouth University Macalester College
- Notable works: Suburban Erasure (2013)

Walter David Greason is an American historian whose research addresses suburbanization, racial segregation, and economic history, with a focus on New Jersey and the Northeastern United States. He is the DeWitt Wallace Professor of History at Macalester College in Saint Paul, Minnesota, where he has taught since 2021.

He has also worked in public history and digital humanities, including the restoration of the T. Thomas Fortune House in Red Bank, New Jersey, and the compilation of the "Wakanda Syllabus," an online bibliography connected to Black Panther and Afrofuturism.

== Early life and education ==
Greason grew up in Monmouth County, New Jersey, in Freehold Borough and Manalapan Township, and graduated from the Ranney School in 1991. He graduated from Villanova University with a bachelor's degree in history in 1995, having studied as a Presidential Scholar with additional work in English, philosophy, peace and justice studies, and Africana studies. He completed a PhD in history at Temple University in 2004 as a Future Faculty Fellow.

== Academic career ==
=== Monmouth University ===
Greason was a faculty member at Monmouth University, where he taught history and later served as chair of the Department of Educational Counseling and Leadership. He held the rank of associate professor in the department. In February 2017 he was appointed dean of the university's Honors School. According to the university, he was the first African American to hold each of those two positions at Monmouth.

=== Macalester College ===
Greason joined Macalester College in 2021. He is the DeWitt Wallace Professor of History and Wallace Endowed Chair of History in the Department of History.

=== Research and writing ===
==== Suburban Erasure ====
Suburban Erasure: How the Suburbs Ended the Civil Rights Movement in New Jersey was published by Fairleigh Dickinson University Press in 2013. The book examines African American communities across a rural and suburbanizing corridor of central New Jersey from the Reconstruction era to the late twentieth century, arguing that postwar suburban development obscured rather than resolved patterns of racial inequality.

Reviewing the book in The American Historical Review, Michael J. Birkner described it as a wide-ranging study drawing on archival documents, oral histories, and government reports, and noted that Greason's definition of "suburbs" does not correspond to a conventional middle ground between rural and urban America.

==== Later books ====
Greason contributed the chapter "Unequal Housing and the Case for Reparations" to The Black Reparations Project: A Handbook for Racial Justice (2023), edited by William A. Darity Jr., A. Kirsten Mullen, and Lucas Hubbard for the University of California Press.

== Public and digital history ==
=== T. Thomas Fortune Cultural Center ===
Greason was the founding president of the T. Thomas Fortune Foundation, which oversees the T. Thomas Fortune House in Red Bank, New Jersey, a National Historic Landmark associated with the journalist Timothy Thomas Fortune. The house, which had fallen into disrepair and faced possible demolition, was purchased by a private developer in 2016 and restored at a cost of roughly $1.5 million; the T. Thomas Fortune Cultural Center opened in 2019. Greason has described the restoration as a model for other communities of an alliance between local government, residents, and private funding.

=== Wakanda Syllabus ===
Published in 2016, the list was subsequently adopted and adapted by academic libraries as a teaching resource following the release of the 2018 film.

=== Rondo-Verse ===
Greason collaborated with the Hallie Q. Brown Community Center and Macalester College student Jolie Davis on Enter the Rondo-Verse, a Roblox-based digital project exploring the history of the historically Black Rondo neighborhood in Saint Paul, Minnesota. Benny Roberts, executive director of the Hallie Q. Brown Community Center, connected with Greason, who introduced him to Davis, a Macalester student who had designed a board game for one of Greason's classes. Davis and Roberts subsequently developed the project as a way to preserve and share the history of Rondo with younger audiences.

Greason described the project as part of a broader transformation in education involving digital tools and said that digital technologies provided new opportunities to preserve historic communities. He also discussed the project's use of interactive storytelling to help users understand individual stories and their relationship to the wider history of Rondo.

=== Virtual reality and curriculum projects ===
Greason was part of the national team of historians who developed content for Shifting Landscapes, a 360-degree virtual tour of the Gallier House in New Orleans produced by Hermann-Grima + Gallier Historic Houses. The tour presents the antebellum house through the experience of Laurette, a woman enslaved by the Gallier family, and addresses urban enslavement and the built environment.

== Public policy work ==
Greason directed the Economic Justice Committee of the New Jersey Reparations Council, a body convened by the New Jersey Institute for Social Justice in 2023 and co-chaired by Taja-Nia Henderson and Khalil Gibran Muhammad. The council's report, For Such a Time as This: The Nowness of Reparations for Black People in New Jersey, was released on Juneteenth 2025 after a two-year study of the state's history of slavery and its economic legacy.

== Professional service ==
Greason served as treasurer of the Society for American City and Regional Planning History from 2010 to 2020.

== Selected publications ==
- Suburban Erasure: How the Suburbs Ended the Civil Rights Movement in New Jersey. Madison, NJ: Fairleigh Dickinson University Press, 2013. ISBN 978-1-61147-570-8.
- Planning Future Cities (co-edited with Anthony Pratcher II). Kendall Hunt, 2017.
- Cities Imagined: The African Diaspora in Media and History (co-edited with Julian Chambliss). Kendall Hunt, 2018.
- "Unequal Housing and the Case for Reparations", in The Black Reparations Project: A Handbook for Racial Justice. University of California Press, 2023. ISBN 978-0-520-38381-4.
- Illmatic Consequences: The Clapback to Opponents of "Critical Race Theory" (co-edited with Danian Darrell Jerry). Universal Write Publications, 2023. ISBN 978-1-942774-90-7.
- The Graphic History of Hip Hop (illustrated by Tim Fielder). The Graphic History Company, 2024. ISBN 978-0-9962046-9-9.
