= Jerome B. Peterson =

American newspaper editor (1859–1943)

Jerome Bowers Peterson
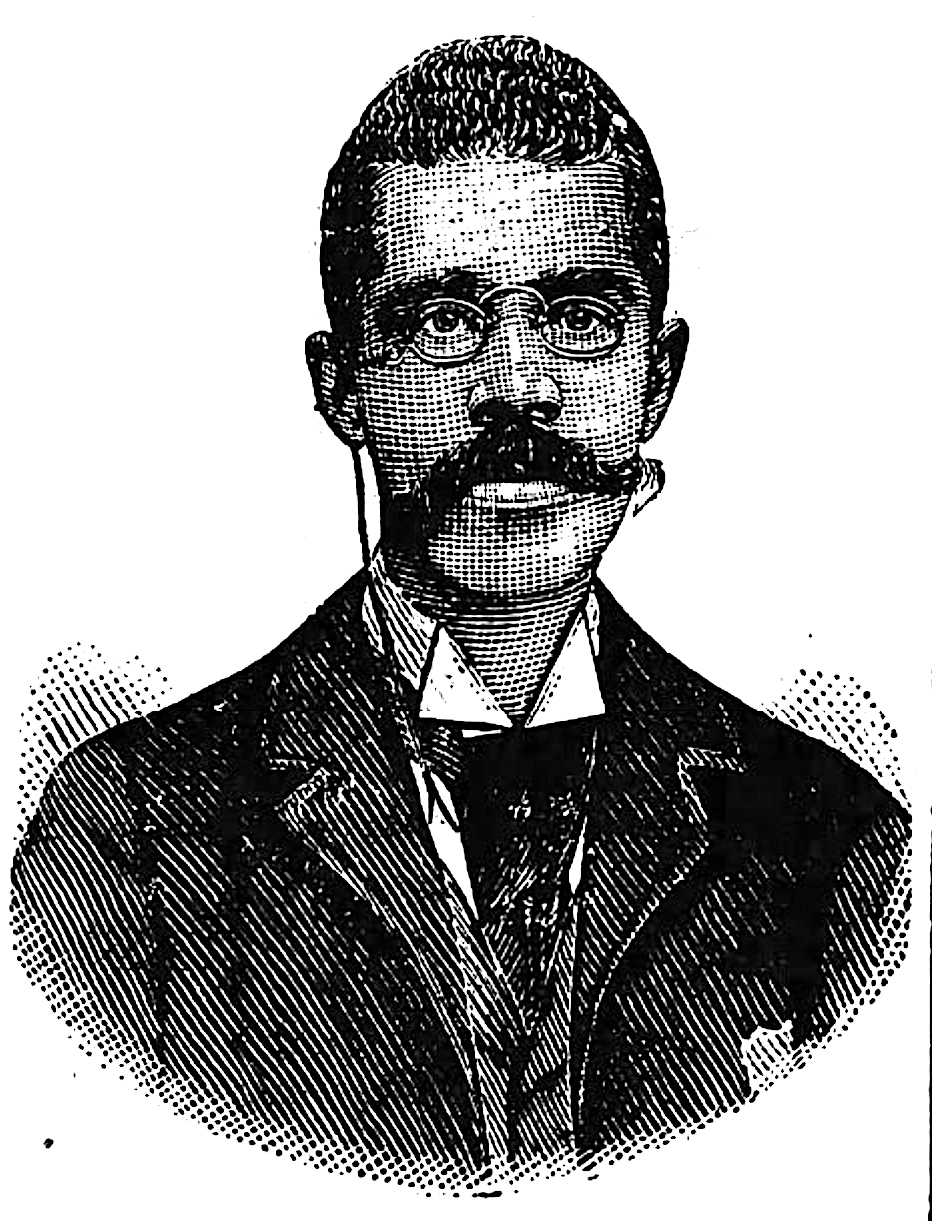
- Peterson engraving, 1904
- Born: September 12, 1859; Brooklyn, New York City, New York, United States
- Died: February 19, 1943 (aged 83); Brooklyn, New York City, New York, United States
- Burial place: Cypress Hills Cemetery
- Other name: J.B. Peterson
- Occupations: Newspapers editor, U.S. consular official, IRS customs revenue, IRS deputy collector
- Spouse(s): Amelia L. White (m. ?–?), Cornelia Steele White (m. ?–1926; her death)
- Children: 3

Jerome Bowers Peterson (1859–1943), was an American newspaper editor in New York City, as well as a consular official for the United States Department of State, and served as customs revenue appointee for the Internal Revenue Service (IRS) in San Juan, Puerto Rico. Peterson was a co-founding editor of The New York Age newspaper in 1887, and held a consular position to Puerto Cabello, Venezuela in 1904 to 1906.

== Early life and education ==
Jerome Bowers Peterson was born on September 12, 1859 in Brooklyn, New York, United States. He was African American, and some records list him as "mulatto". He lived on Sullivan Street, and attended the Mulberry Street School in Manhattan, an African Free School.

== Career ==
=== Newspaper ===
Peterson was a founding owner and editor at The New York Age, a noted African American newspaper in New York City, working alongside editor Timothy Thomas Fortune, and his brother Emanuel Fortune Jr. Ida B. Wells was invited by Peterson and Timothy Thomas Fortune to advance her anti-lynching campaign at the New York Age newspaper. In 1907, Fred R. Moore purchased The New York Age from Timothy Thomas Fortune and Peterson; and Peterson remained the paper's editor until 1933.

=== Department of State ===
Charles William Anderson recommended Peterson to William Loeb Jr., the secretary to President Theodore Roosevelt, for a consular position in 1903 under the United States Department of State. Peterson worked as consul to Puerto Cabello, Venezuela, from 1904 to 1906. He was succeeded in the consular position by James W. Johnson.

=== Internal Revenue Service ===
He was deputy collector of Internal Revenue Service (IRS), under the leadership of Charles W. Anderson. He was appointed deputy collector in San Juan, Puerto Rico in 1913. He retired from U.S. federal service in 1931.

== Death and legacy ==
He died on February 19, 1943 in Brooklyn. His estate papers were archived at Yale University; and he has work at the Theodore Roosevelt Center at Dickinson State University. Details about Peterson's life and work are also outlined in his granddaughter Carla L. Peterson's book Black Gotham: A Family History of African Americans in Nineteenth-Century New York City.

== Personal life ==
He married in 1893 to Cornelia Steele White; she was the daughter of Philip A. White, a former member of the Brooklyn Board of Education. Together they had three children. She died in 1926 in New York City after surgery.

His son, Jerome Sidney Peterson (1903–1987) worked for the New York City Department of Health, and later served as a medical director for the World Health Organization (WHO). His granddaughter is the literary scholar and historian Carla L. Peterson.

== See also ==
- African Americans in foreign policy
- Civil rights movement (1865–1896)
