= Laura Adorkor Kofi =

Ghanaian minister and activist

Laura Adorkor Kofi (1893- 8 March 1928), commonly known as Mother Kofi, was a Ghanaian minister and activist associated with the Universal Negro Improvement Association. She was assassinated while preaching in Miami, Florida.

== Early life ==
Laura Adorkor Kofi (surname variously spelled as Kofy, Koffey or Kofey) was born near Accra, Ghana, possibly into a royal family. A plaque at her gravesite gives the title "Princess", and 1893 as a birthdate; other sources put her birthdate much earlier. Some versions of her early life also say that she experienced visions and voices which encouraged her to go abroad and teach Africans in America. Her detractors in her last years spread rumors that she was born "Laura Champion" in Athens, Georgia; but religious history scholar Richard S. Newman compiled evidence to confirm that she was, in fact, Ghanaian by birth.

== Career ==
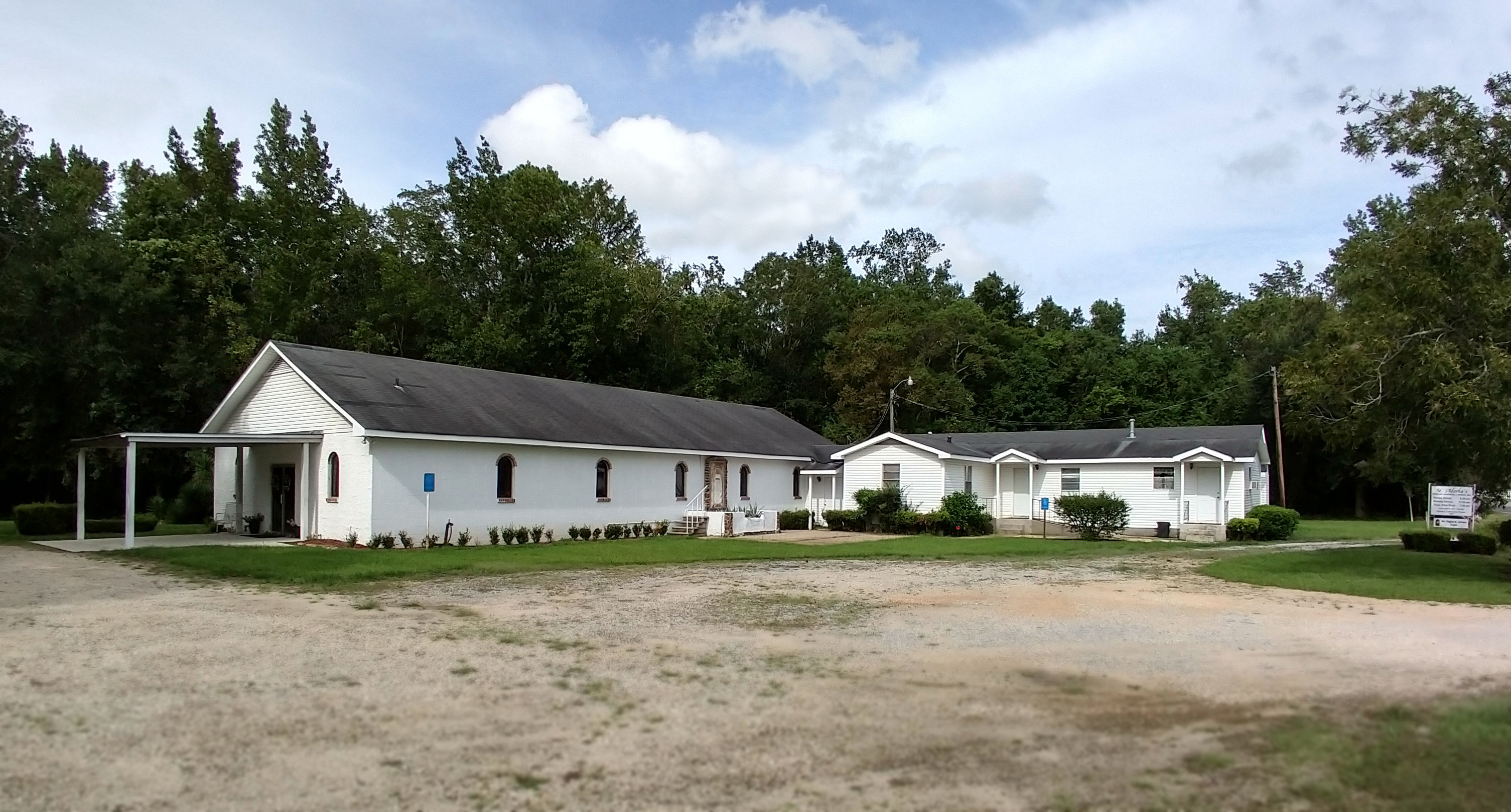
St. Adorka's African Universal Church, founded by Laura Adorkor Kofi in 1929 in Belforest, a community in Daphne, Alabama.

Kofi moved to North America around 1918, and lived in Detroit for several years. She worked as national field director for Marcus Garvey's Universal Negro Improvement Association, touring the deep South and attracting large crowds as a "prophet" (in her own estimation), with her base in Jacksonville, Florida. In 1927 she founded the African Universal Church, with herself as its head ("Warrior Mother of Africa's Warriors of the Most High God" was her self-chosen title). Garvey soon decided that she was building too much of a following independent of his cause, and announced, "This woman is a fake and has no authority from me to speak." He also encouraged his followers to have her arrested for fraud.

In March 1928, Laura Adorkor Kofi was shot while speaking from the pulpit at a church in Miami. She died from the gunshot wound to her head; a Jamaican follower of Marcus Garvey, Maxwell Cook, presumed to be her assailant, was immediately beaten to death by the congregation who witnessed the attack. Ten thousand people are said to have attended her funerals in several cities; her remains were dressed in robes of black, green and red, placed in a bronze casket, and entombed in a mausoleum in Jacksonville's Old City Cemetery.

Her congregation called a new pastor from South Africa, Eli Nyombolo. They continued her work as the Missionary African Universal Church. In the 1940s, on the outskirts of Jacksonville, they built a small settlement they called "Adorkaville" after Mother Kofi. (Most of Adorkaville was demolished by the city in the 1970s, after Nyombolo died and the church experienced infighting and schism.)

There is a small collection of research materials related to Laura Adorkor Kofi at the New York Public Library.
