= The New York Age =

African-American newspaper published 1887 - 1960

- "The Afro-American Journal of News and Opinion"
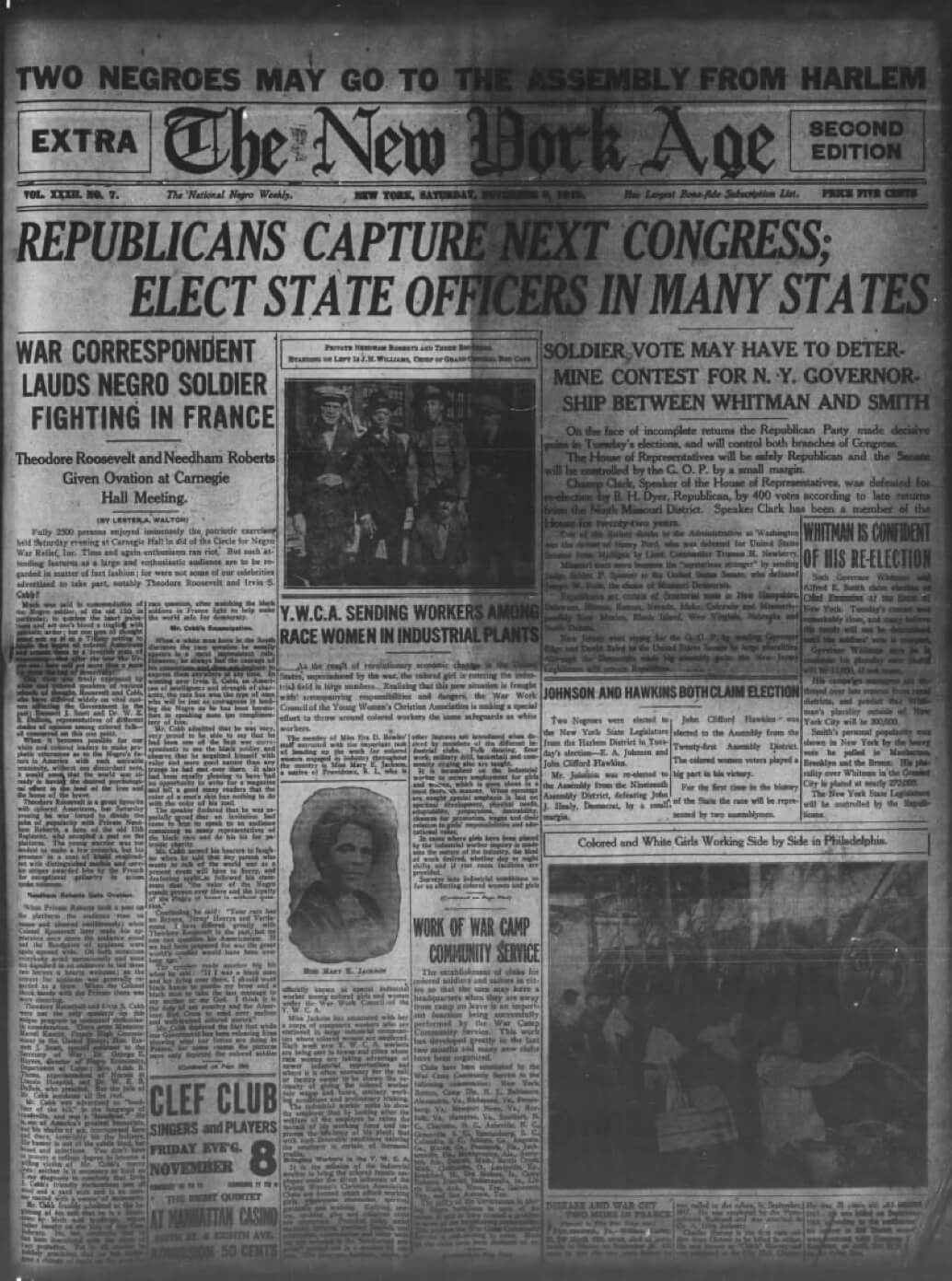
- Cover of The New York Age on November 9, 1918
- Type: weekly newspaper
- Format: African-American newspaper
- Owner(s): Timothy T. Fortune (1887–1907), Emanuel Fortune Jr. (1887–1907), Jerome B. Peterson (1887–1907), Fred R. Moore (1907–1943)
- Editor: Timothy T. Fortune (1887–1907), Jerome B. Peterson (1887–1907)
- Founded: October 15, 1887; 139 years ago
- City: New York City, New York, United States

The New York Age was an American weekly newspaper established in 1887 in New York City. It was widely considered one of the most prominent African-American newspapers of its time. It also went by the names the New York Globe, the New York Freeman, and the New York Age Defender.

== History ==
=== Origins, 1884–1887 ===
The New York Age newspaper was founded as the weekly New York Globe (not to be confused with New York's Saturday family weekly, The Globe, founded 1892 by James M. Place or the daily The New York Globe founded in 1904), an African-American newspaper that was published weekly from at least 1880 to November 8, 1884. It was co-founded by editor Timothy Thomas Fortune, a former slave; his brother, Emanuel Fortune Jr.; and editor, Jerome B. Peterson.

The newspaper became the [New York] Freeman, from November 22, 1884 to October 8, 1887, published six times weekly.

=== 1887–1960 ===
On October 15, 1887, the newspaper officially became the weekly New York Age. Fred R. Moore bought the paper in 1907 from Fortune brothers and Peterson. Peterson continued to work at the paper after the sale, as an advisor; and was made the American consul to Puerto Cabello, Venezuela, from 1904 to 1906. From 1953 to 1957, it was titled the New York Age Defender.

Gertrude Bustill Mossell worked at the New York Age from 1885 to 1889. W. E. B. Du Bois also worked there.

=== The 1974 Reawakening of the African-American weekly ===
In 1974, the New York Age was revitalized by Adam Clayton Powell III in an attempt to recapture the energy and influence the original Age had. The new version of the paper initially published 100,000 copies. The New York Times reported in 1974: “The paper has six, full‐time reporters and will have bureaus in the Bedford‐Stuyvesant section of Brooklyn, in Harlem and in Newark.”

== Personnel ==
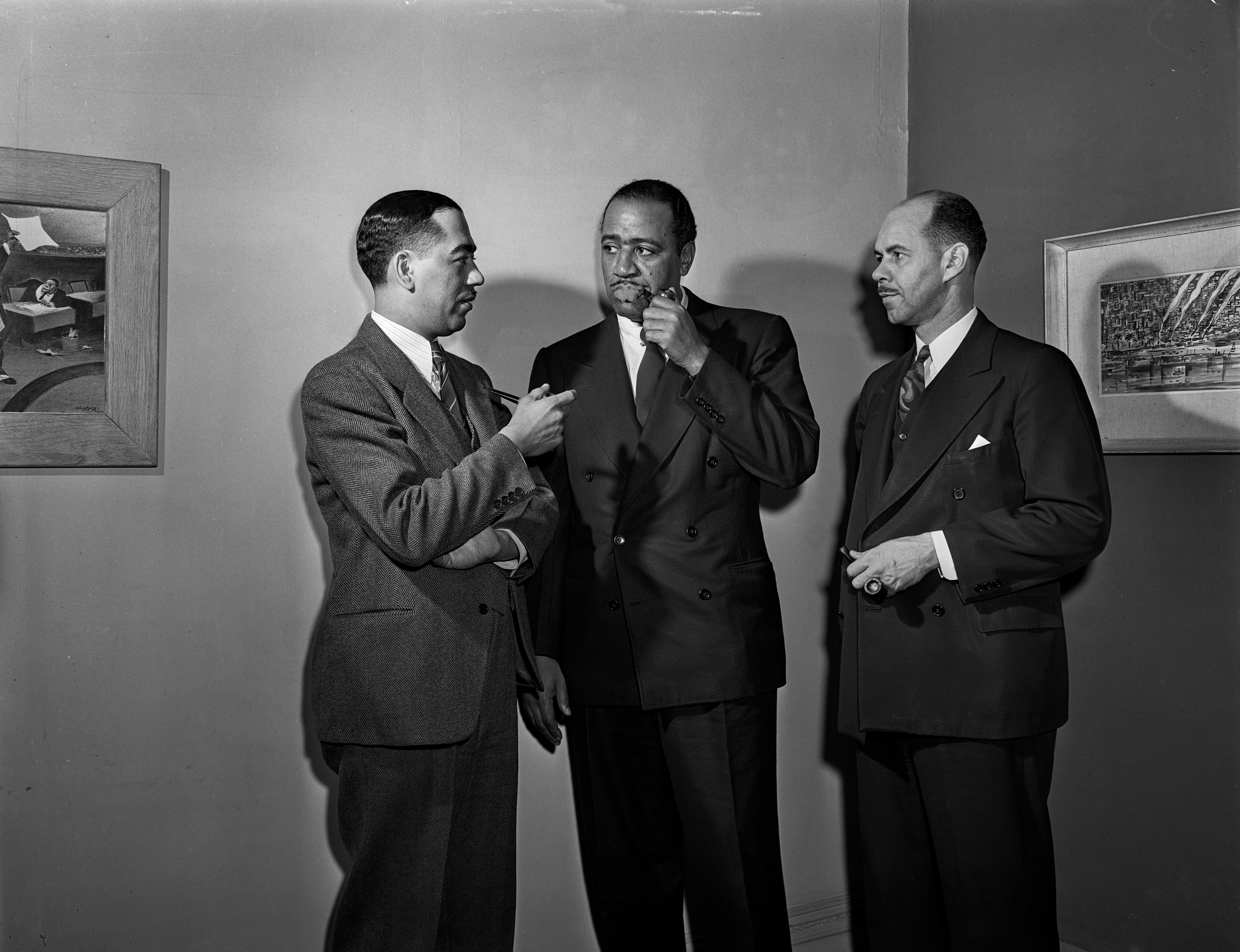
Ludlow Werner (left) speaks with New York City Councilman Benjamin J. Davis Jr. (center), April 1945

- Olive Arnold Adams
- Bertram Baker, special columns
- William A. Clarke, sports editor
- Lewis E. Dial, sports column
- Richard Durant, music critic
- Timothy Thomas Fortune, editor
- Emanuel Fortune Jr., editor
- William Henderson Franklin, correspondent
- James H. Hogans, wrote news of railroad men and church doings
- Vere E. Johns, arts column, art critic
- Jerome B. Peterson, editor
- Ebenzer Ray, special columns
- Chester R. Thompson, editor of the Brooklyn section
- Lester Walton, theater critic; and son-in-law of the publisher, Fred R. Moore
- Ludlow "Buster" Werner (né Ludlow Waymouth Werner; 1907–1967) managing editor in 1929; and grandson of Fred R. Moore
