= Fred R. Moore =

American publisher

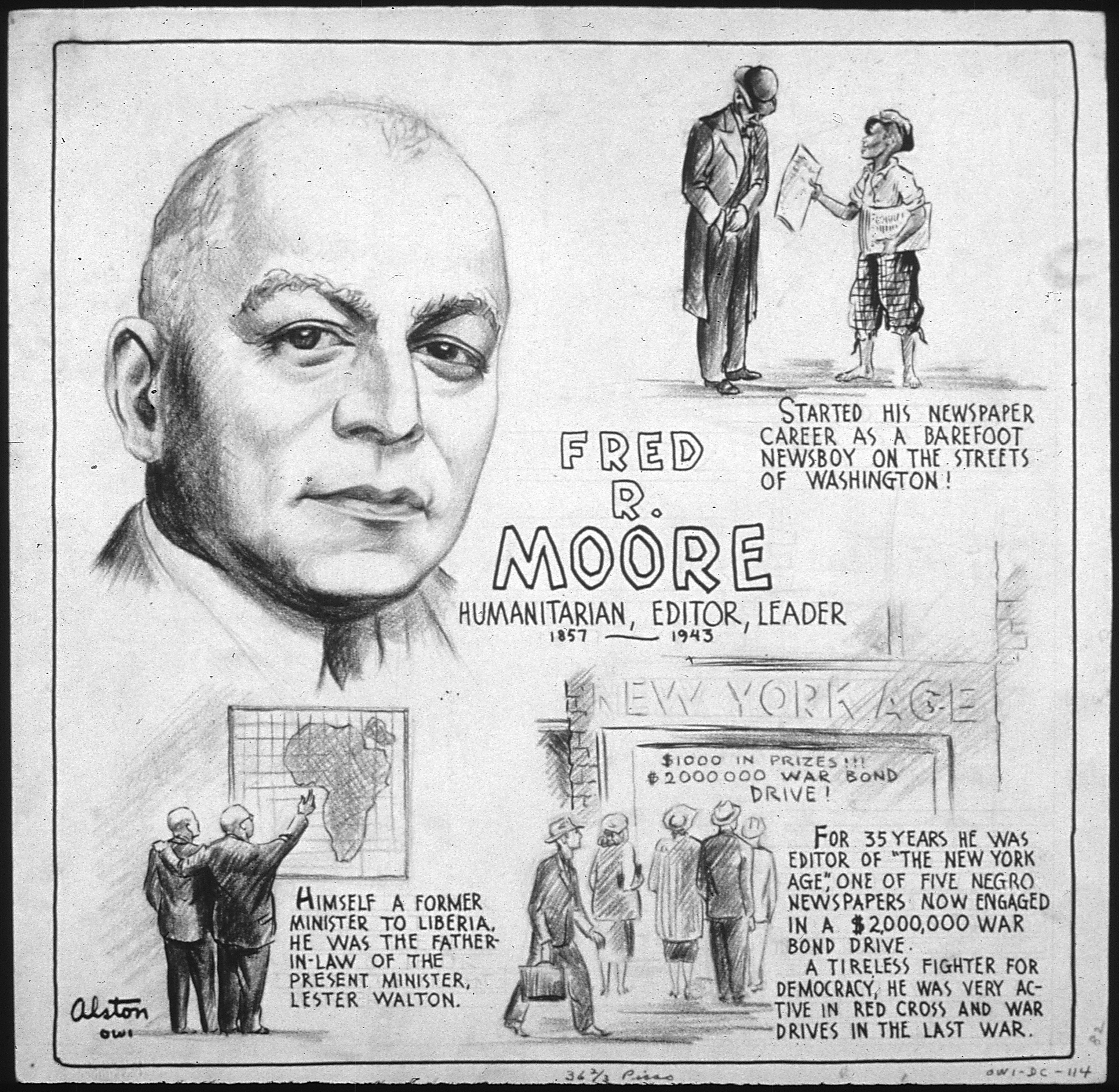
Fred R. Moore

Fred R. Moore (16 June 1857 – 1 March 1943) was an American newspaper editor and publisher who became closely associated with Booker T. Washington until Washington's death in 1915. He worked to promote the National Negro Business League founded by Washington in 1900. He became editor and publisher of the Colored American Magazine in 1905, through Washington's influence. He had the reputation as one of the most important newspapermen in the US.

== Biography ==
He was born in Virginia to Evelyn Diggs. He married Ida Lawrence April 9, 1879 and they had numerous children.

Again through Washington, he bought New York Age newspaper from Timothy Thomas Fortune and Jerome B. Peterson, and Moore became editor and purported owner in 1907, a position he held until his death.

He was a Republican, and U.S. president William H. Taft appointed him Minister to Liberia but he served for only a month. He lived at 14 Douglass Street in Brooklyn.
