= T. Thomas Fortune House =

Historic house in New Jersey, US

- U.S. National Register of Historic Places
- U.S. National Historic Landmark
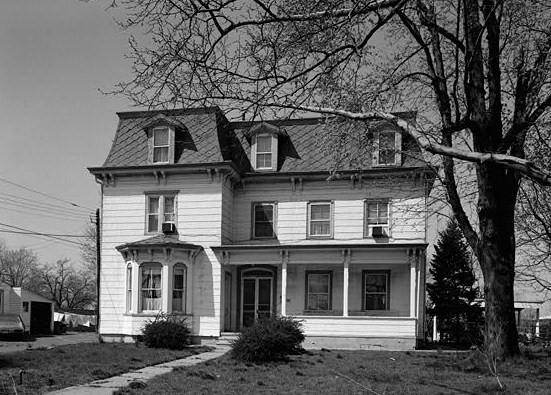
- T. Thomas Fortune House, 1980

- Location within Monmouth County, New Jersey Location within New Jersey Location within the United States
- Location: 94 Drs. James Parker Blvd., Red Bank, New Jersey
- Coordinates: 40°20′31″N 74°04′21″W
- Area: 9.9 acres (4.0 ha)
- Built: mid-19th century
- Architectural style: Victorian
- NRHP reference No.: 76001171

Significant dates
- Added to NRHP: December 8, 1976
- Designated NHL: December 8, 1976

The T. Thomas Fortune House, also known historically as Maple Hall, is a historic house at 94 Drs. James Parker Boulevard in Red Bank, Monmouth County, New Jersey, United States. Built in the mid-19th century, it was the home of Timothy Thomas Fortune (1856–1928), a leading African-American journalist and civil rights advocate, from 1901 to 1908. The house was named a National Historic Landmark in 1976. It is now owned by a nonprofit organization dedicated to preserving and promoting Fortune's legacy of activism and community involvement.

== Description and history ==
The T. Thomas Fortune House is located southwest of downtown Red Bank, on the north side of Drs. James Parker Boulevard near its junction with Willow Street. The house is an eclectically styled Victorian wood-frame structure, with two full stories and a third underneath a mansard roof. It is an L-shaped structure, with a projecting section to the left and a single-story porch across the front to its right. The porch and a polygonal window bay on the projection feature Italianate doubled brackets in their eaves. The mansard roof is pierced by gabled dormers.

The house appears to have been built in stages in the mid-19th century, by James Bergen on a foundation that dates to the 18th century. It was purchased by T. Thomas Fortune in 1901, and was home to his family until 1908. Fortune separated from his family and moved out in that year, and his wife and son remained until 1911. The Fortunes named the property "Maple Hall", and made it a center of the local African-American community, hosting social, cultural and political events. After the Fortunes moved out, the house was owned for many years by the Vaccarrelli family, who operated a bakery.

The house, then in poor condition, was threatened with demolition in 2016. A development plan authorized the construction of a housing complex on part of the property, with the house itself to be restored and donated to a local nonprofit. The T. Thomas Fortune Foundation and Cultural Center opened in the restored house in 2019.

== See also ==
- List of National Historic Landmarks in New Jersey
- National Register of Historic Places listings in Monmouth County, New Jersey
