= Old City Cemetery (Jacksonville, Florida) =

Coordinates: 30°19′57″N 81°38′56″W

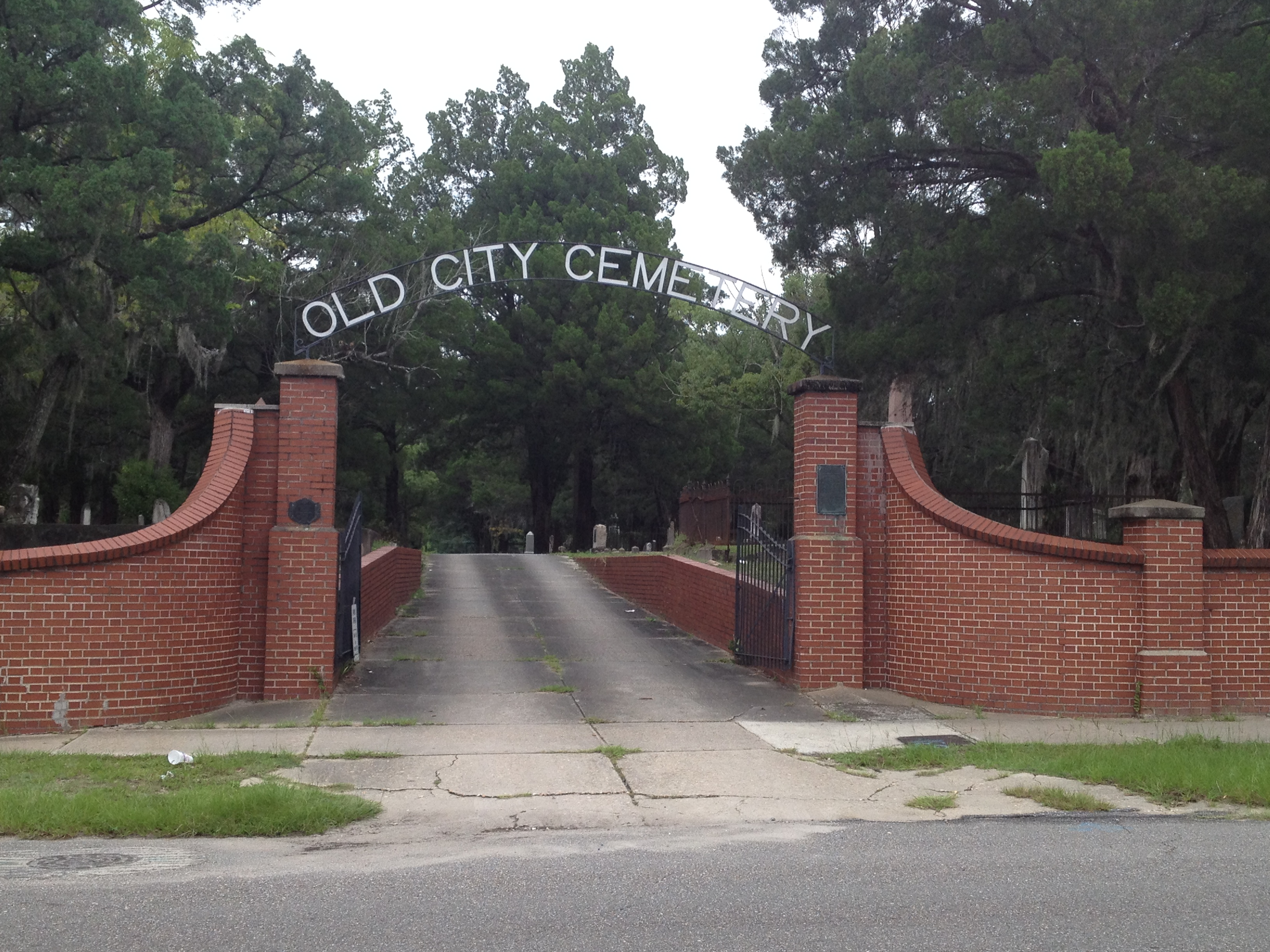
- The entrance to Old City Cemetery
- Interactive map of Old City Cemetery
- Location: Jacksonville, Florida
- Built: 1852

The Old City Cemetery in Jacksonville, Florida was established in 1852 as Jacksonville's main burial ground. After the American Civil War the cemetery later interred many Confederate veterans and veterans of the Union Army’s United States Colored Troops. Because the cemetery is over 160 years old, the Jacksonville Historic Landmarks Commission has deemed it a historic landmark of Jacksonville. The United Daughters of the Confederacy placed a historical plaque for the cemetery in 1949 and then a wall at the entrance of the cemetery in 1954.

== Notable burials ==
Notable individuals buried at the cemetery include:

- Byron Kilbourn (1801–1870), surveyor, railroad executive, business magnate and politician who was an important figure in the founding of Milwaukee, Wisconsin and the city's third and eighth mayor (Note: Having been serving as the city's third mayor in 1848, he was elected for his second, non-consecutive, term in 1854, what has made him the eighth one.)
- Captain Jacob Brock (1810–1876), steamboat captain operating on the St. Johns River
- Joseph Finnegan (1814–1885), brigadier general of the Confederate States Army
- John Freeman Young (1820–1885), second bishop of the Episcopal Diocese of Florida, renown for his translation of Christmas carol Silent Night, Holy Night (German: Stille Nacht, heilige Nacht) from German to English
- Francis P. Fleming (1841–1908), 15th Governor of Florida
- John Claudius “Claude” L'Engle (1868–1919), Democratic Representative from Florida to the Sixty-third Congress
- Dr. Alexander H. Darnes (1846–1894), the first African-American physician in Jacksonville and the second in the state
- Laura Adorkor "Mother Kofi" Kofi (1893–1928), founder of the African Universal Church
- Alice Nunn (1927–1988), actress, remembered for her role as "Large Marge" in Pee Wee's Big Adventure.

== Decay and vandalism ==
Despite being one of the oldest and most historical cemeteries in Jacksonville it has been neglected and in decay. Due to the increased downtown urbanization around the cemetery and poor security it has endured vandalism over the years. Some gravestones have been damaged or simply toppled over in certain areas of the cemetery.

== Gallery ==
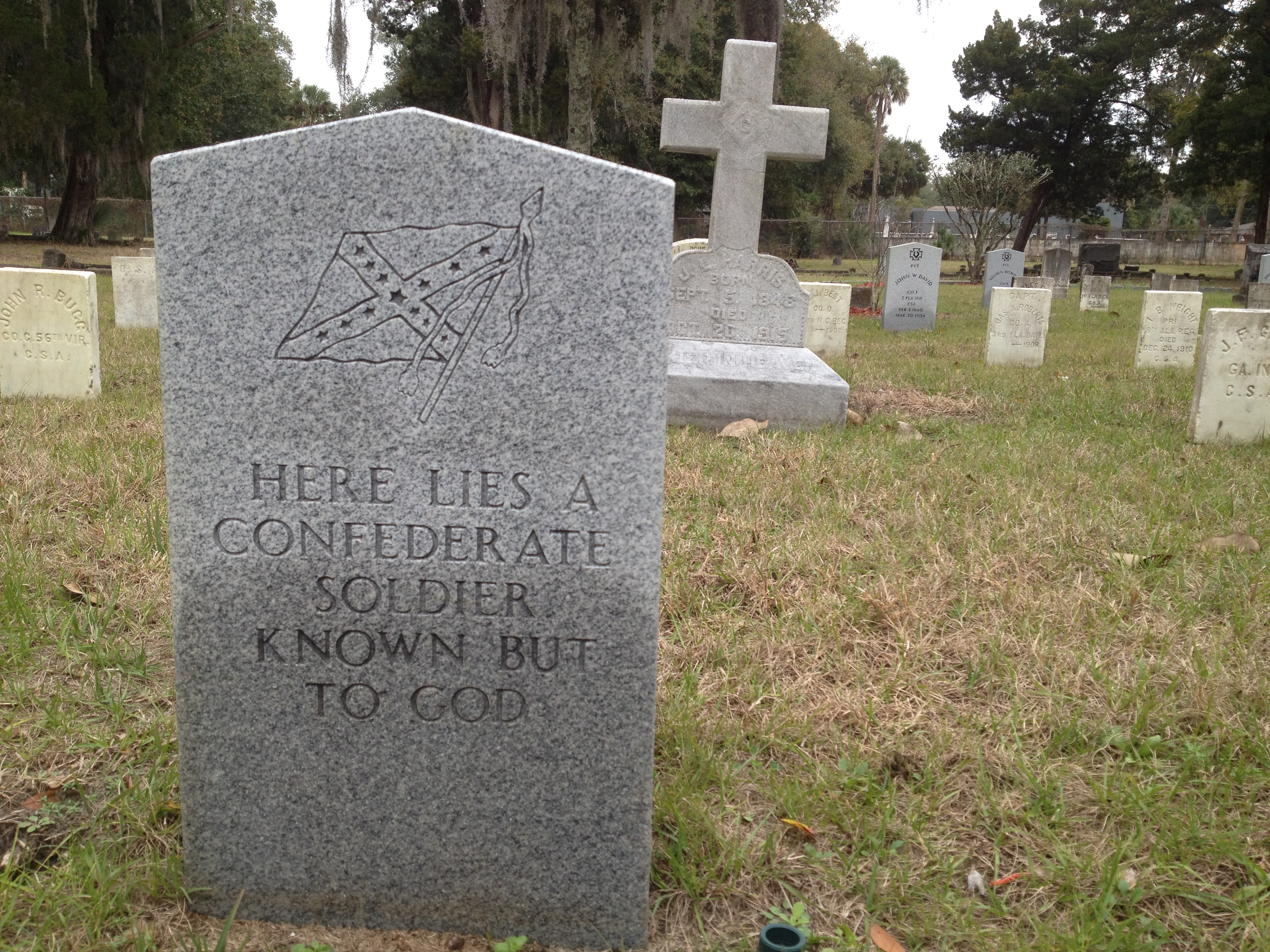
Unknown Confederate grave in the Confederate section of the cemetery.

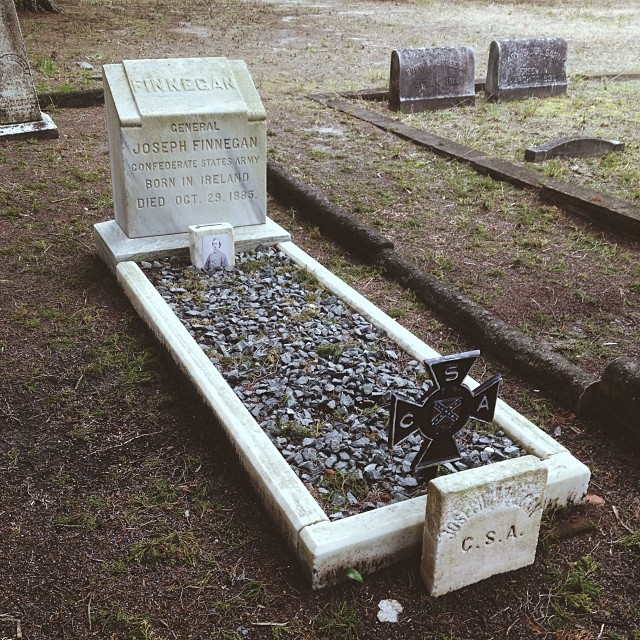
Confederate brigadier general Joseph Finnegan

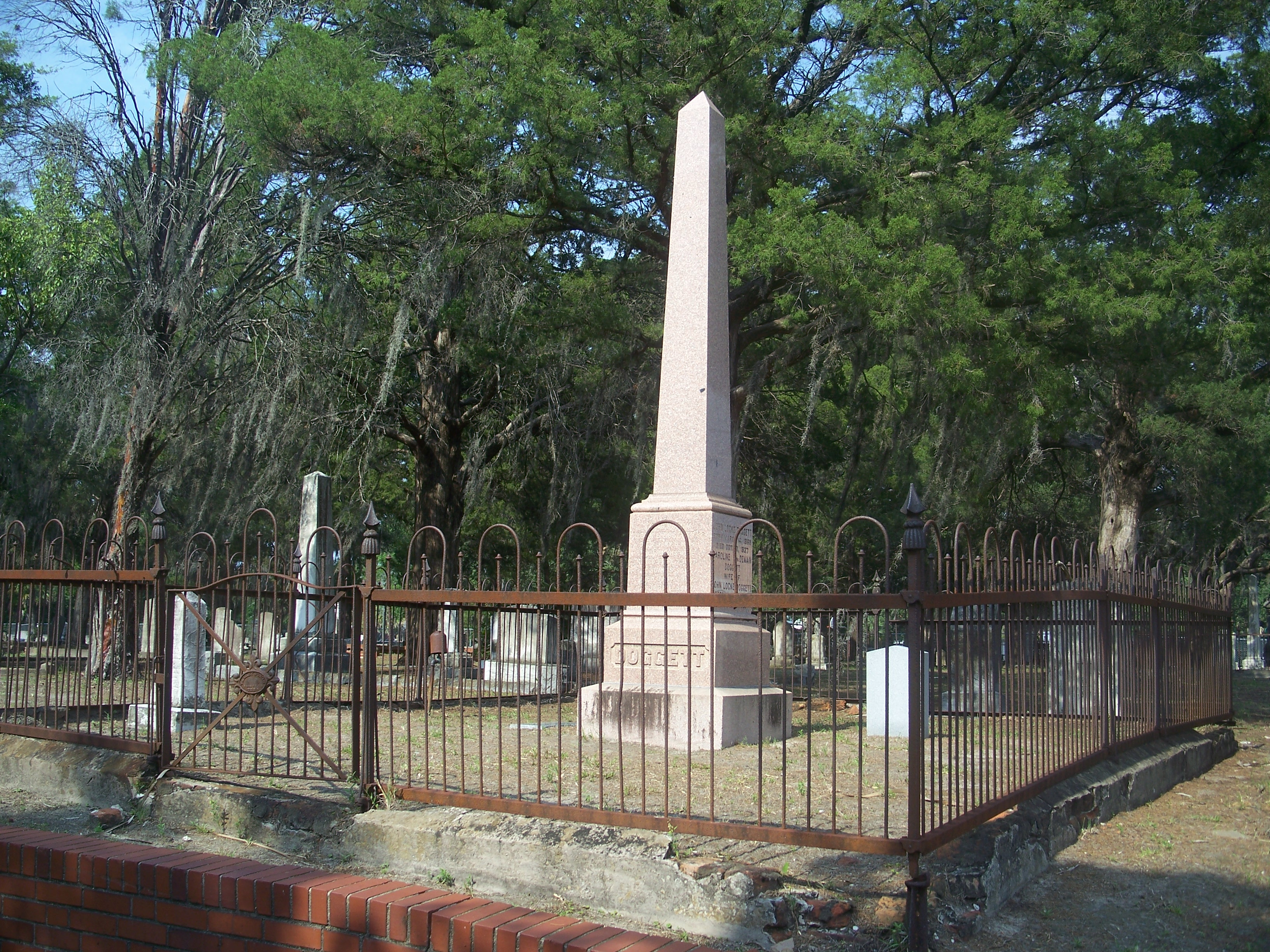
An enclosed grave area.

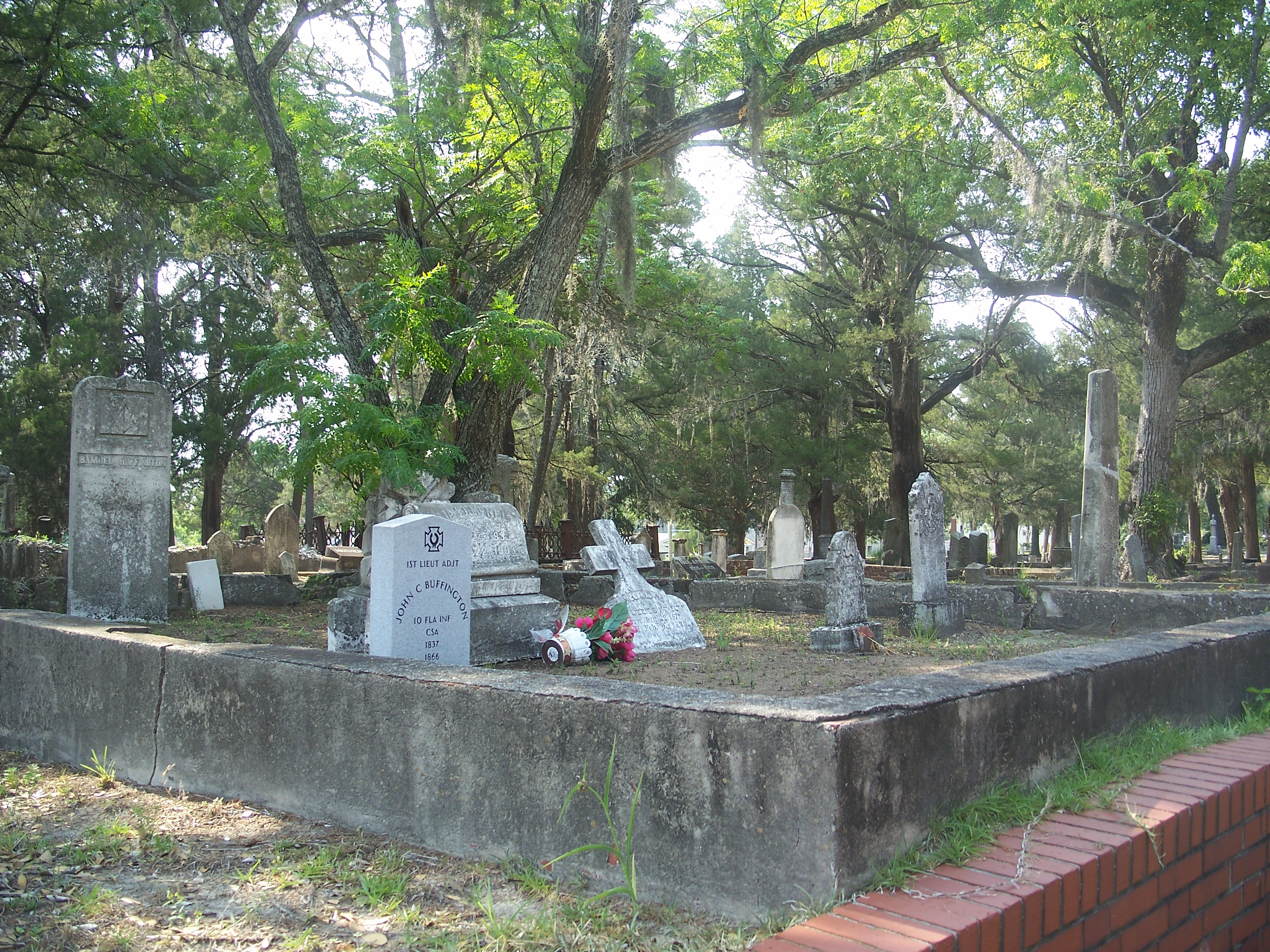
A Confederate grave among other graves.

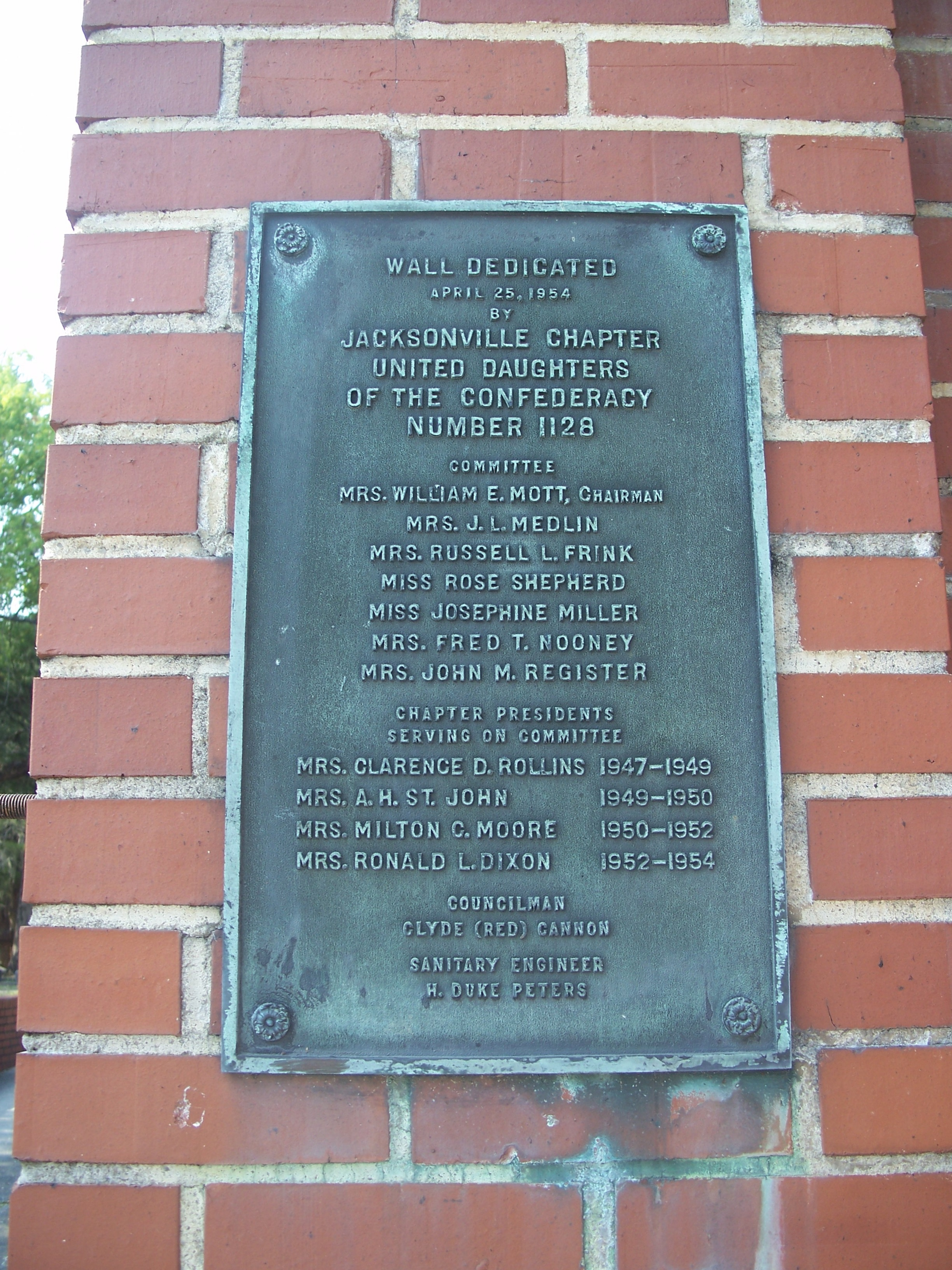
Plaque dedication of the wall donated by the United Daughters of the Confederacy.

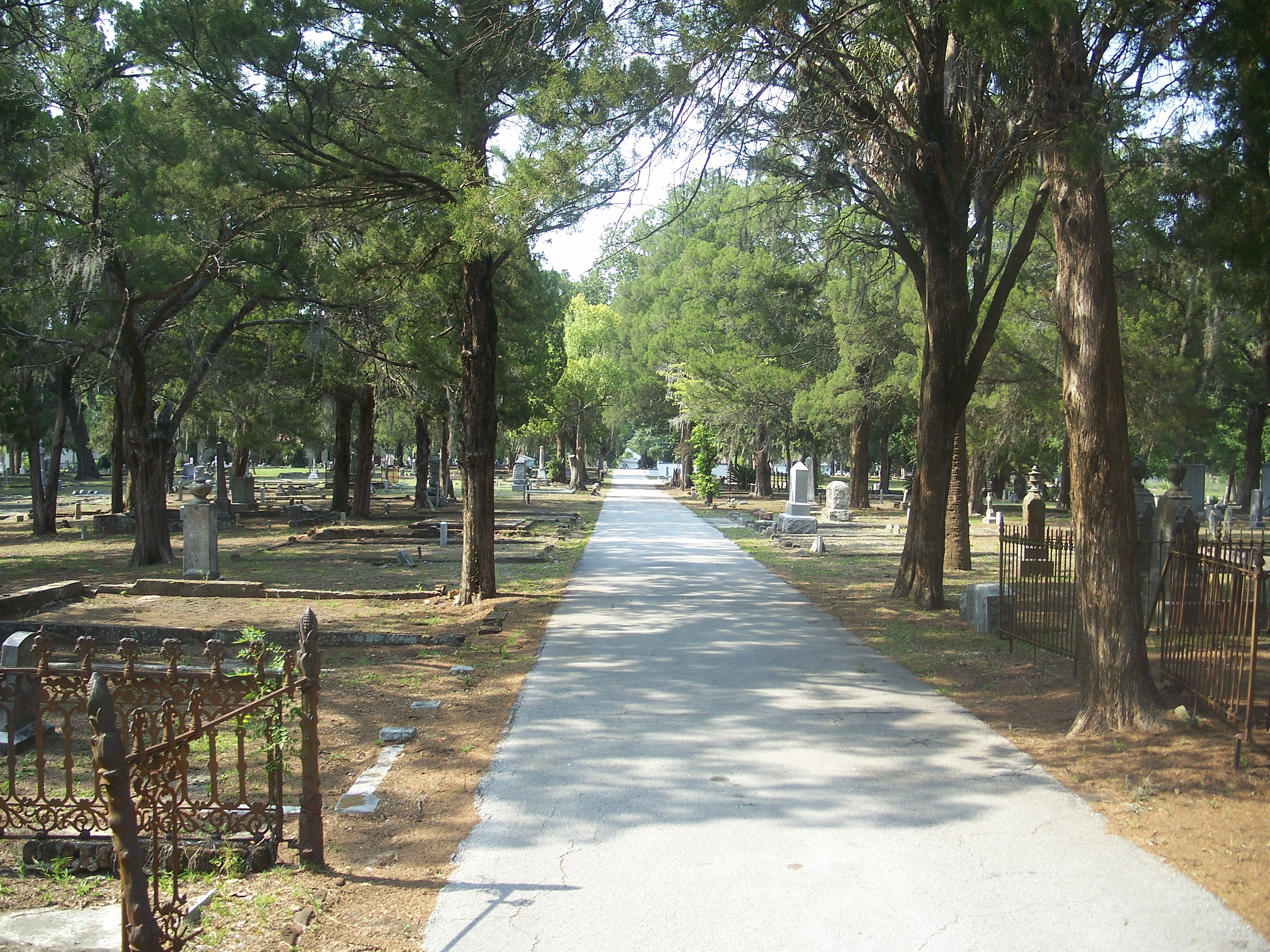
The main pathway of the cemetery.
