= T. Thomas Fortune =

American journalist and civil rights activist

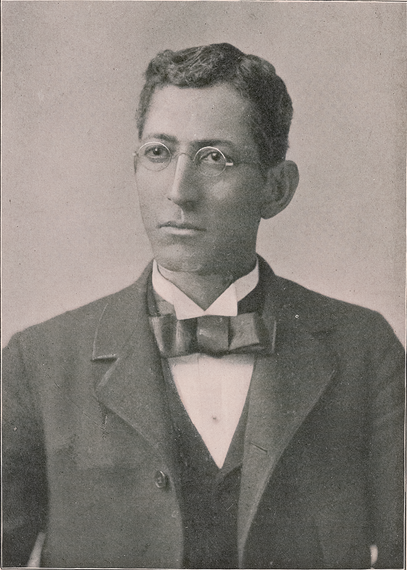
- Fortune in 1901
- Born: Timothy Thomas Fortune; October 3, 1856; Marianna, Florida, US
- Died: June 2, 1928 (aged 71); Philadelphia, Pennsylvania, US
- Education: Stanton Institute; Howard University
- Occupations: Journalist; newspaper publisher; orator
- Era: Gilded Age; Progressive Era
- Employer: The New York Age
- Organizations: National Afro-American Council; National Afro-American League; National Negro Business League
- Known for: Civil rights activism
- Notable work: Black and White: Land, Labor, and Politics in the South; Dreams of Life: Miscellaneous Poems
- Political party: Republican (Note: Fortune's political allegiances varied throughout his life. He was described as "nominally" Republican and was a frequent critic of the party.)
- Spouse: Carrie C. Smiley
- Children: 5
- Parent(s): Emanuel Fortune, Sarah Jane Fortune

Timothy Thomas Fortune (October 3, 1856 – June 2, 1928) was an American journalist, newspaper publisher, orator, and civil rights activist who was best known as the managing editor of The New York Age. Fortune was born into slavery in Marianna, Florida. Following emancipation, Fortune's father, Emanuel, was involved in Florida politics and secured Fortune a role as a page in the Florida Legislature, where he developed an interest in politics and a distrust of white politicians. During this time, he learned the printer's trade. In his late teens, he briefly attended Howard University, worked as a printer in Washington D.C., and married.

Fortune moved to New York City around 1880 and took editorial oversight of the Rumor, which became The New York Globe. He quickly gained a reputation for his editorials, which followed him to subsequent publications the New York Freeman and the Age. Widely considered the best African American journalist of his age by his peers, Fortune wrote and spoke often of racial injustices suffered by African Americans, criticized politicians both Democratic and Republican, argued against monopolies and for class solidarity, and was a proponent of African Americans defending themselves with force, if needed, which gained him a reputation as an agitator. Praise was not universal for Fortune, and critics called him the "crank of the colored press" and "dangerous". He was a founding member of the National Afro-American League, National Afro-American Council, and National Negro Business League.

In the 1890s, Fortune developed a strong friendship with Booker T. Washington and helped promote his aims, which were often in conflict with Fortune's personal beliefs. Fortune edited and ghostwrote Washington's publications while writing for the Age. Despite his fame, Fortune's work as a journalist was never profitable and Washington financially supported the Age with loans and paid stories. Fortune's health began to decline in the late 1890s and he developed a reliance on alcohol that continued to worsen through the 1900s. He suffered a mental health crisis in 1907 and sold his stake in the Age, coinciding with the end of his relationship with Washington.

Fortune was soon destitute and subsisted by freelancing for various publications in the United States. His health gradually improved through the 1910s and he assumed the editorship of the Negro World in 1923. He held the position until his death in 1928. Following his death, Fortune was eulogized as the "dean of Negro journalists" and his work as "the voice of the Negro".

== Early life and education ==
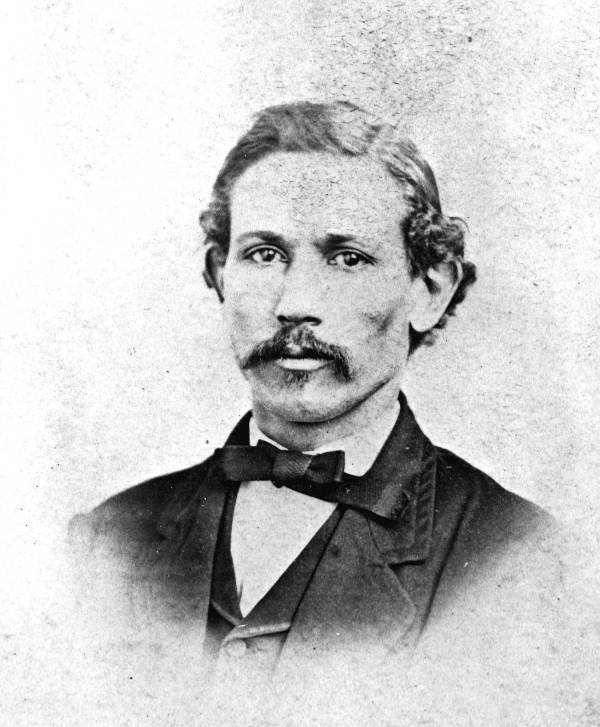
Emanuel Fortune, Sr.

Timothy Thomas Fortune was born a slave in Marianna, Florida, on October 3, 1856, to Emanuel and Sarah Jane Fortune, the third of five children. Emanuel and Sarah Jane were of African, European, and Native American descent. Following the end of the American Civil War, Union troops and the Freedmen's Bureau operated a school in Marianna which Fortune attended and at which he developed a love for books. Fortune also worked around the home, fished, picked cotton, and began learning the printer's trade at the Marianna Courier.

Emanuel became involved in Florida politics during the Reconstruction era. He was a member of the state's constitutional convention of 1868 and elected to the Florida House of Representatives. Reconstruction upheaval and white supremacist mob violence forced the family to flee to Jacksonville, Florida, in 1869 and had a strong impact on the young Fortune. Emanuel had secured Fortune a job as a legislative page in the Florida Senate and he was in Tallahassee when the family fled to Jacksonville. Fortune worked as a page for four legislative sessions, during which time he developed an interest in politics and a lifelong mistrust of white politicians, whom he had witnessed taking advantage of their African American (Note: Contemporary sources and subsequent scholarship use a range of descriptors for African Americans, including "black", "Negro", "African American" and "colored". Fortune briefly popularized the term "Afro-American". For consistency, "African American" is used throughout this article except in the cases of proper nouns or direct quotations.) counterparts. Fortune also worked in the offices of the Tallahassee Sentinel, learning further the printer's trade.

In his teens, Fortune returned to Jacksonville. He enrolled in the Stanton Institute, which he attended for two years, and worked at the Jacksonville Daily Union as a printer's devil. In 1873, Fortune began working at the Jacksonville post office as an office boy and newspaper clerk, then was appointed mail route agent on the Jacksonville, Pensacola & Mobile Railroad line between Jacksonville and Chattahoochee in 1874. The same year, he was named a special customs inspector in Delaware. Fortune resigned the position after a few months to attend Howard University, enrolling in winter 1874. His limited schooling led him to be assigned to the preparatory department of the university, which rounded out his education in Latin, mathematics, grammar, and history. Fortune, though religious himself, found the school's emphasis on religion stifling, later writing he "did not matriculate at the college for the purpose of learning how to die, but how to live" and that religious observances took up too much time and impacted his ability to study.

While attending Howard, the bank in which he stored his savings failed, leaving him penniless. Fortune began to work as a courier for the United States Treasury and in the print shop of The People's Advocate while taking evening law classes at the university. He was largely self-taught, reading books on history, government, literature, and law. It was during this time he developed his literary and oratory style. In 1877, Advocate owner John Wesley Cromwell moved the publication from Alexandria, Virginia, to Washington, D.C., and placed Fortune in charge of printing. Fortune also wrote an opinion column under the nom de plume Gustafus Bert. During his time in Washington, he married Carrie C. Smiley.

Financial woes led the Advocate to cut Fortune's pay, and coupled with Carrie's desire to return home for the birth of their first child, the family moved back to Florida in 1877. He briefly worked as a teacher in Duval and Madison counties but found conditions and pay unbearable. He returned again to the Daily Union, but found the post-Reconstruction environment of the American South intolerable, and moved his family to New York City around the turn of the decade. (Note: Sources conflict on when precisely Fortune moved to New York. Emma Lou Thornbrough's 1972 biography states the move occurred in 1881, as do other later scholarly examinations of Fortune's life. However, contemporary reporting, including profiles by Irvine Garland Penn and Daniel Wallace Culp, as well as earlier scholarship, state Fortune moved to New York in 1879.)

== Career ==
=== The New York Globe ===
In New York, Fortune began working as a compositor for the religious newspaper The Weekly Witness. After a year, he partnered with George Parker and Walter Sampson in an effort to save Parker's paper, the Rumor, from financial ruin. Fortune became managing editor of the Rumor, writing and setting the paper in the evenings and working for the Witness during the day. He insisted on renaming the Rumor to The New York Globe; the paper assumed the name in July 1881. The Globe began as a four-page weekly and quickly gained recognition for its high print quality and Fortune's editorials.

He believed the editorial page to be the most important page in a newspaper, and used his columns to militantly advocate for civil rights and criticize the federal government for its failure to protect African American citizens. Fortune's editorials covered an array of issues, including support for interracial marriage and the creation of a federal education bureau; criticism of racial segregation, Jim Crow laws, and the back-to-Africa movement; denouncements of monopoly, protective tariffs, and land grants to railroad companies; lamentations of court cases that eroded civil rights; and coverage of the worsening conditions for African Americans in the American South. He also advocated for African Americans to use force to defend themselves if needed, garnering him a reputation as an agitator. In an analysis of Fortune's editorial style, academic Carolyn Calloway-Thomas described his use of counterproof, direct questions, examples, and concrete evidence to serve as the foundation of his arguments and expose weaknesses in the positions of his opponents. Linguistically, Fortune's writing was geared toward a more educated audience and relied upon turns of phrase. He commonly utilized long sentences to contextualize a point, then followed them with short sentences to state his conclusions.

The Globe's coverage was focused on national and racial news, rather than local New York happenings, and by 1883 it claimed to have circulation of more than 6,000 and subscribers in every state in the United States. The paper had eleven employees in its editorial and printing departments, and correspondents across the East Coast and in Chicago. According to historian Emma Lou Thornbrough and contemporaries including Irvine Garland Penn, Fortune was widely regarded as the most influential African American journalist in the US and the Globe as the country's most powerful and influential African American newspaper. Praise was not universal, and both members of the white and African American press, including William Calvin Chase and The Macon Telegraph, criticized Fortune and the Globe, calling him the "crank of the colored press" and "dangerous".

In 1884, Fortune published Black and White: Land, Labor and Politics in the South, a book on race relations and economics in which reviewers saw Fortune espouse economic theories similar to those of Henry George and John Swinton. The Globe began experiencing financial difficulties the same year for reasons that remain unclear; Thornbrough attributed the difficulties partially to Fortune's editorial attacks against the Republican Party. At the time, most African Americans supported Republicans, whom Fortune accused of abandoning their minority constituents. He likewise disavowed Bourbon Democrats, declared the Globe independent of party politics, and vacillated between supporting Republicans and Democrats, saying both parties were "rotten to the core". Fortune repeatedly attacked Republicans through his editorials and advised African Americans to become independents. He ultimately supported Grover Cleveland in the 1884 United States presidential election, though the Globe offered a weak endorsement to James G. Blaine. In August 1884, George Parker sold his stake in the Globe to William B. Derrick, who wanted to make the paper a partisan organ for the Republican Party, a desire with which Fortune vehemently disagreed. Parker had also taken out a mortgage collateralized by the Globe's printing presses and other equipment; immediately after the election, Parker's attorneys foreclosed on the mortgage and seized the equipment, effectively closing the paper. The Globe published its final issue on November 8, 1884.

=== The Freeman ===
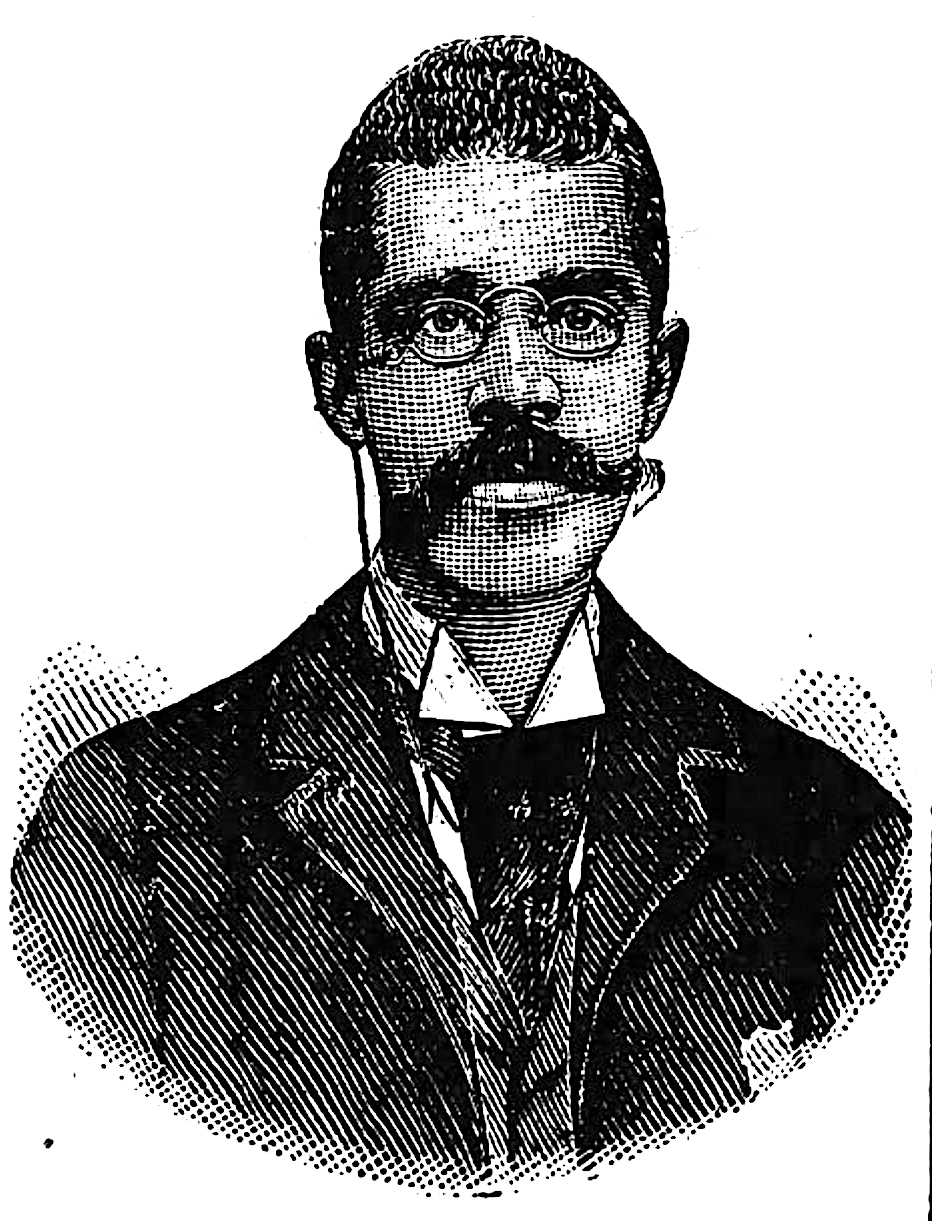
Jerome B. Peterson (depicted in a 1904 engraving) was an early contributor to the Freeman's editorial pages and later became editor of the paper, which he renamed The New York Age.

Two weeks after the publication of the Globe's final issue, Fortune launched the Freeman, later the New York Freeman. He was the editor and sole owner. The paper quickly ran into financial difficulties but by the end of 1885 had achieved a semblance of stability and claimed a circulation of approximately 5,000. The business supplemented its income with job printing. Early contributors to the paper included John Edward Bruce and Gertrude Bustill Mossell.

As with the Globe, the Freeman's renown relied heavily upon Fortune's editorials. (Note: Writing for The Indianapolis Freeman, W. Allison Sweeney said of Fortune, "Coming into notice first, a few years since, as editor of The Globe, published in New York City, he has since then, through his editorship of The Freeman, published in the same city, made him nearly a household name throughout the land. As a brilliant, pointed, aggressive editorial writer, Mr. Fortune deserves all the fame he has garnered to himself. It is not indulging in the least hyperbole to say that he is considered by many the leading editorial writer and all-around newspaper man of his race.") Jerome B. Peterson and Thomas McCants Stewart also contributed to the editorial page. Fortune's writings reflected his economic interests and the inspiration of George and Swinton, argued against African American workers acting as strikebreakers, advocated for temperance and racial justice, and opposed the reduction of federal representation from states that disenfranchised African American voters. Fortune also used the Freeman to voice his support for the Cleveland administration, which some of his peers in the African American press criticized as whitewashing the president.

Though he had intended the Freeman to be a business entirely by African Americans, for African Americans, financial struggles led him to partner with two unnamed white men for financial support with the job printing business in early 1886 that left him in editorial control of the Freeman. The same year, Fortune published the pamphlet The Negro in Politics, which traced what he saw as the exploitation of African American voters by the Republican Party and urged African Americans to put race before political allegiance. He began offering support for the Prohibition Party in 1887, becoming a registered lecturer at the National Prohibition Bureau in August of that year and saying in October he would be voting for Prohibitionist candidates.

In addition to his fame as a journalist, Fortune had developed a reputation as an orator, and supplemented his income by giving speeches to various groups and engaging in freelance work. It was not enough, and financially struggling and increasingly toxic politically, Fortune left the Freeman. (Note: Thornbrough states Fortune left for financial reasons and to open channels of monetary support from the Republican Party; similarly, Seth M. Scheiner and William Seraile state Fortune left under political pressure from other African Americans due to his support for the Democratic Party, as well as financial reasons.) His brother, Emanuel Jr., and Peterson took over operations of the Freeman in October 1887.

=== The National Afro-American League and Council ===
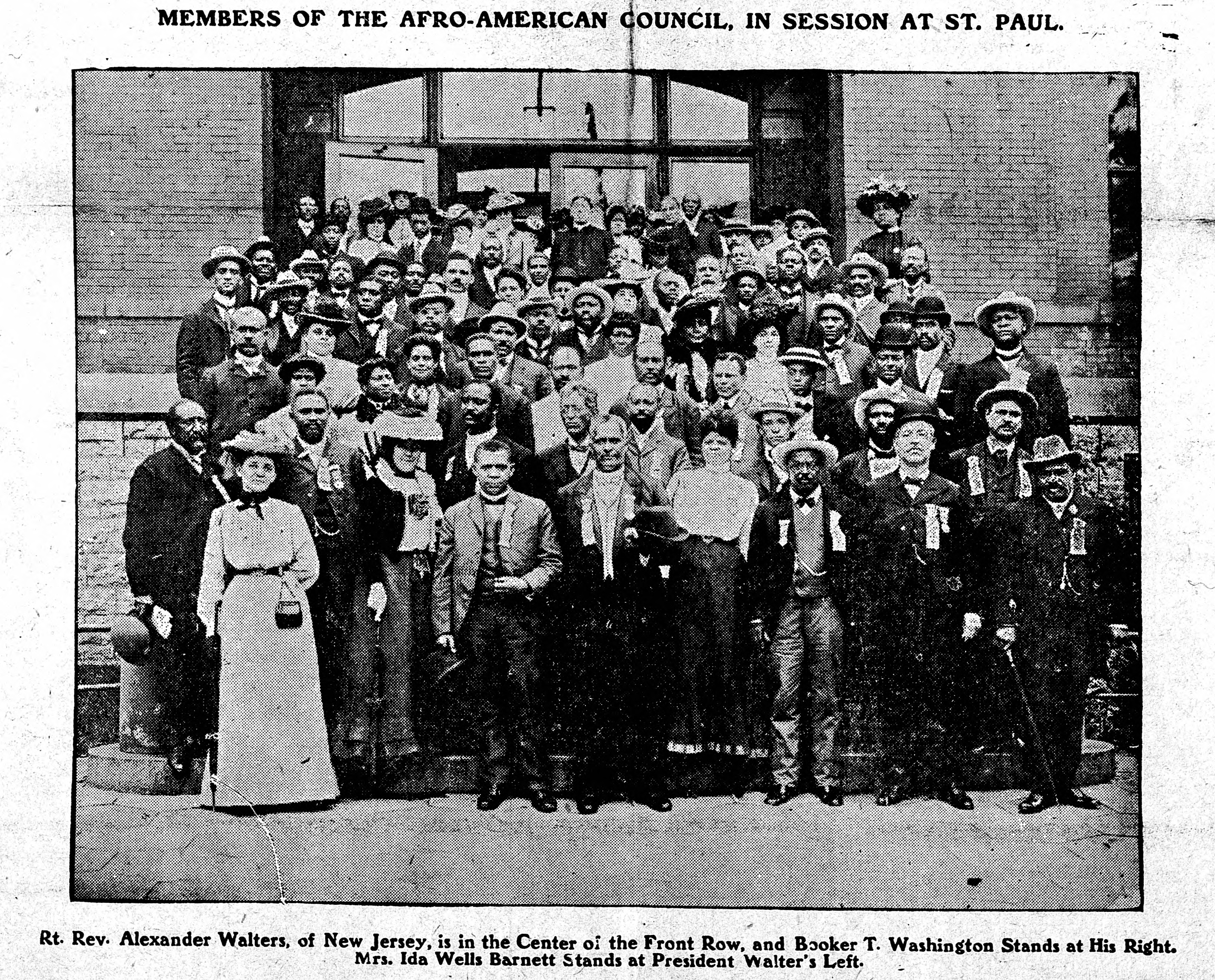
The National Afro-American Council meeting in St. Paul, Minnesota, 1902.

In the late 1880s, Fortune proposed the creation of a national organization to advocate for African American civil rights, focusing on disenfranchisement in the American South, lynching and mob rule, inequity in the distribution of educational funds, reforming the Southern penitentiary system, and discrimination against African Americans in public transit and public spaces. He maintained that the group should be peaceful, and in 1887 drafted a constitution for it that said it would provide education on these issues, seek redress through the court system, and remove violent members. The concept received support from some members of the African American press and racial leaders including Booker T. Washington, though others voiced concerns that it would exacerbate racial tensions rather than relieve them and that there were structural issues, particularly in the South, too great to overcome. Members of the white press in the South were similarly against the organization.

A convention was held in Chicago on January 25, 1890, with 135 delegates from 23 states. A constitution was adopted for the group, dubbed the National Afro-American League, that stated its function was to provide support for similar state and local groups and achieve its aims through peaceful means. Joseph C. Price was elected president of the League; Fortune was elected secretary. Several months after the formation of the League, Fortune was arrested for disorderly conduct following his refusal to leave a hotel bar when staff refused to serve him. Fortune sued the owner in civil court and attempted to use the incident to boost the profile of the League. His legal efforts were successful and a jury awarded him approximately US$1,000; an appeal by the hotel was unsuccessful. The League, however, was not sustained. Delegates to an 1891 convention at which Fortune was elected president of the League represented just seven states, and he declared the League defunct in 1893 due to a lack of funds and support.

As conditions continued to worsen for African Americans in the US, the National Afro-American League was reconstituted in 1898 as the National Afro-American Council, led by Fortune and Alexander Walters, the latter the organization's first president. Meetings of the Council became referendums on the leadership position in race relations of Booker T. Washington, who sought to control the group. Fortune assumed the presidency of the Council in 1902. The Council claimed partial credit for bringing Giles v. Harris, a test case about a voter registration law in Alabama, to the United States Supreme Court in 1903. Attorneys' fees were partially paid by Washington. The Court ruled against the Council. Like the League before it, the Council had little success achieving its aims and garnering support. Fortune went on a lecture tour in 1904 to raise interest and funds, but spent more than he raised and resigned the presidency, citing mass apathy for the effort. (Note: Though ultimately having little impact while under Fortune's leadership, Thornbrough noted the similarity between the platforms of the League and Council to that of the National Association for the Advancement of Colored People.)

=== The Age ===
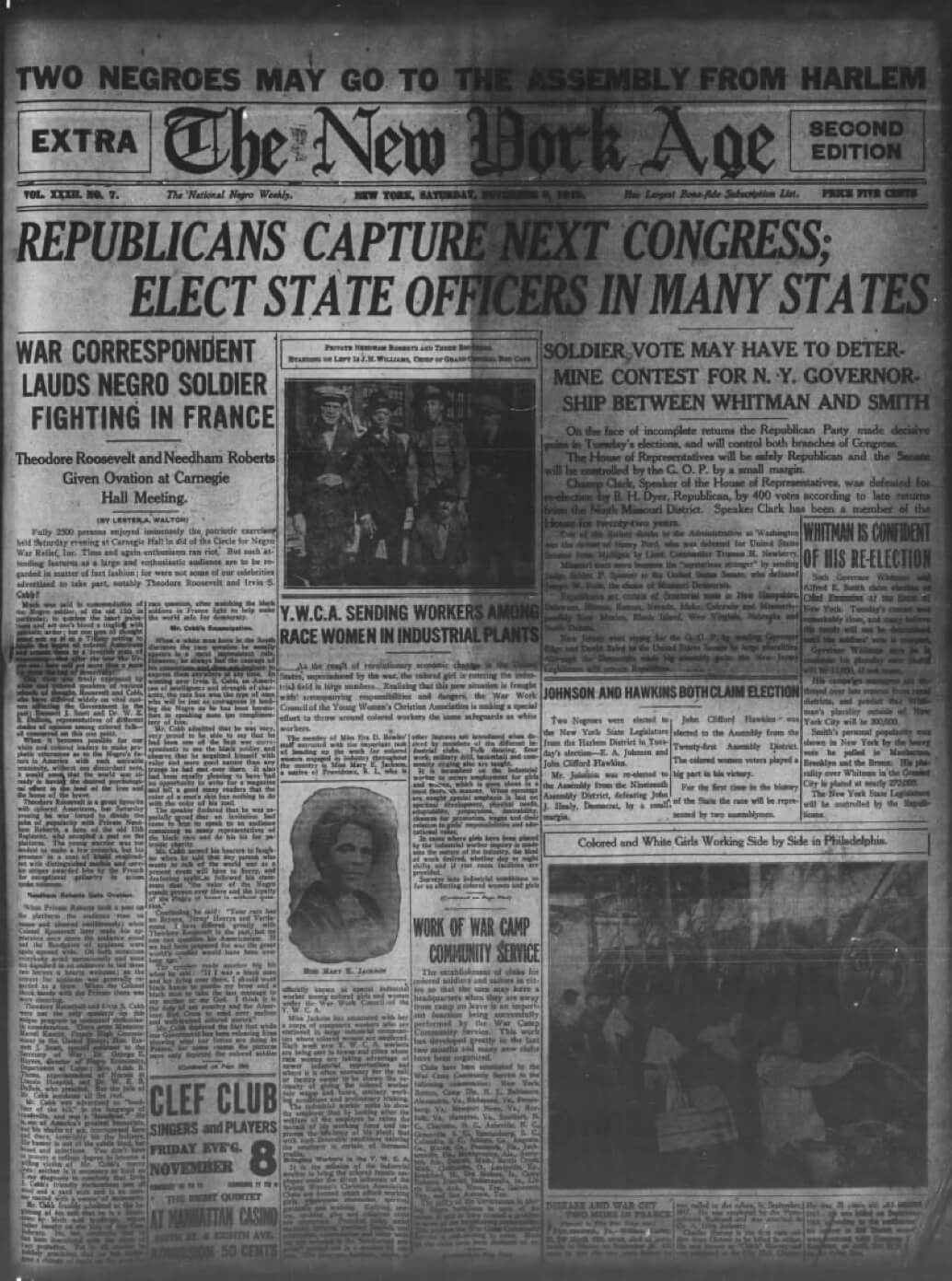
Fortune's newspaper, the Freeman, became The New York Age in October 1887.

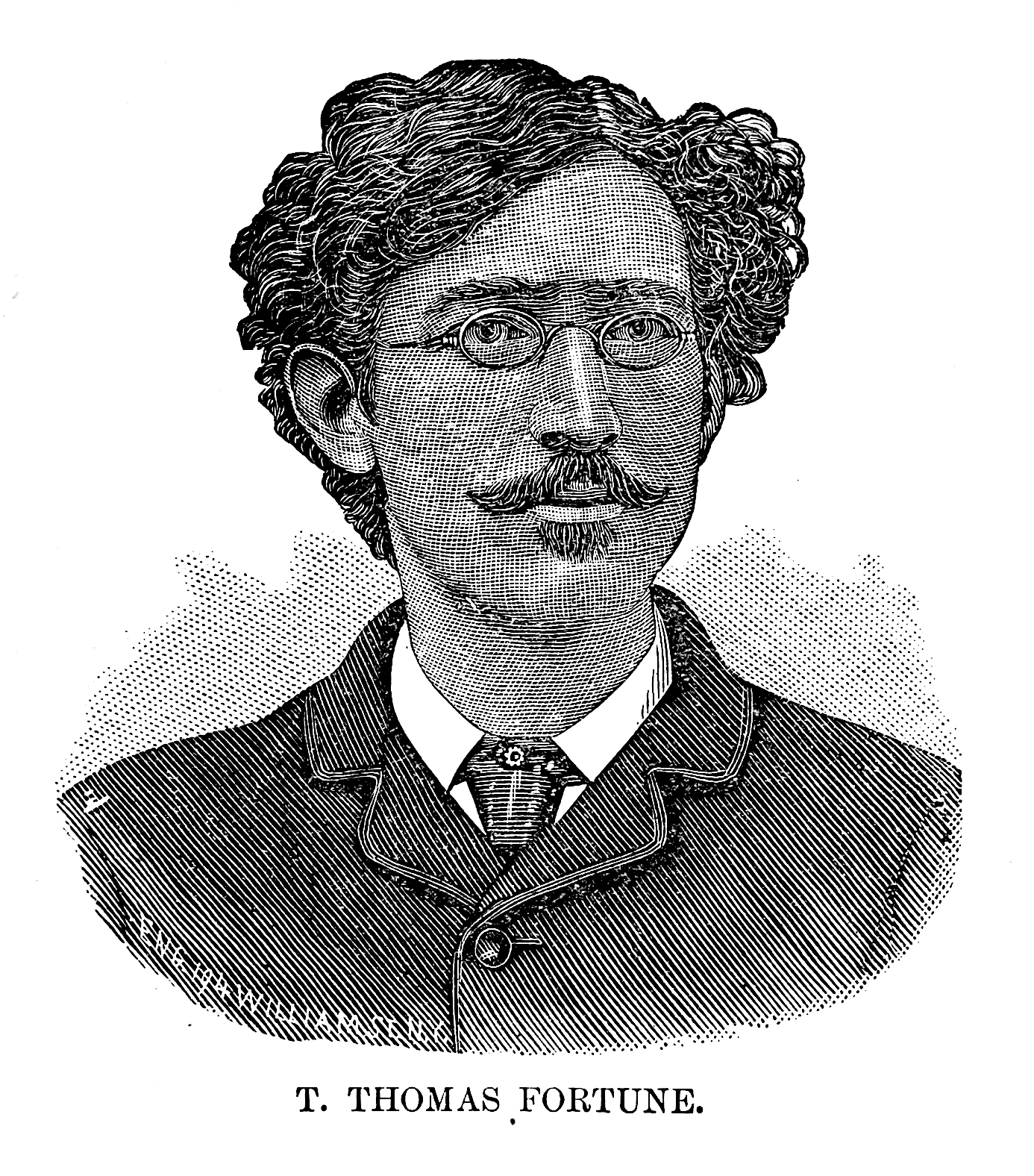
Engraving of Fortune, 1891

Peterson renamed the Freeman to The New York Age and declared it to be a Republican publication in 1887. Fortune went to work as a freelancer, writing for newspapers including the New York Sun and Boston Evening Transcript. Emanuel Jr. contracted pneumonia in the winter of 1888 and went to Florida in 1889 to recuperate, dying in 1890. Fortune returned to the Age as its managing editor in February 1889 but continued to freelance, as the Age was not profitable enough to support both him and Peterson.

According to Thornbrough, the Age was regarded as the best-written and most influential African American newspaper of the late 19th century, owing, as with Fortune's previous publications, to his work on the editorial page. Fortune often wrote in defense of the sexual morality of African American women, condemned antimiscegenation laws, and advocated for the right to interracial marriage. He argued against African American racial purists, noting that racial integration was inevitable short of expatriation of African Americans from the US, and warned against discrimination based on skin tone and prejudice against multiracial people within his race. (Note: Fortune framed this argument in an essay, "The Latest Color Line", published in The New York Sun and Liberia Bulletin in 1897. The essay warns against the separation of "blacks" and "mullatoes" [sic] along the lines of skin tone and calls out the hypocrisy of proponents of black racial purity, including Alexander Crummell, John Wesley Cromwell, and Daniel Wallace Culp, all of whom married mulatto wives. Concluding the essay, Fortune writes, "No friend of the Afro-American race can fail to forget that the black and yellow people of the United States will have their problem of manhood and citizenship further complicated by a color line in a color line. They have enough trouble as matters now stand without borrowing more.") Fortune was a proponent of using the term "Afro-American" to describe his race, arguing that it was the most all-encompassing and that other terms, like "Negro" and "colored", did not describe the whole race, or, in the case of "colored", were a "cowardly subterfuge". (Note: Contemporary African American leaders, including Booker T. Washington and W.E.B. Du Bois preferred to use "Negro" to describe their race.) He advocated for civil rights, neighborhood control of housing and schools, and the creation of an African American state in the Oklahoma Territory. Economically, Fortune's writings relied heavily on class distinctions and had socialist overtones. He urged African Americans to purchase land to build wealth and work with working class whites against landed monopolies. He also debated specific legislation in his columns, supporting the Lodge Bill and opposing the Sherman Silver Purchase Act, McKinley Tariff, and the Conger Compound Lard Bill. In 1890, Fortune was named chair of the executive committee of the National Afro-American Press Association. He hired Ida B. Wells in 1892 following the destruction of the latter's newspaper in Memphis, Tennessee. Wells covered lynching for the Age and Fortune helped secure her speaking engagements.

Fortune had openly supported Grover Cleveland in the election of 1888, but recanted his support for Democrats in August 1889, writing Southern members of the party and Republican Mugwumps had taken significant steps to disenfranchise African American voters. He turned to the Republican Party and worked to elect various candidates, but was often critical of the party for its failures to protect African Americans and felt it had been overrun by "aristocrats and bloated corporationists". The Age endorsed Benjamin Harrison in the presidential election of 1892 and Fortune campaigned for William McKinley in the election of 1896. Fortune excoriated McKinley for his failure to protect African Americans. In a speech before the Racial Protective Association in Washington D.C. in late 1898, Fortune said of McKinley, "I want the man whom I fought for to fight for me, and if he don't I feel like stabbing him," and called for the deaths of one white man for every African American killed at the Wilmington massacre. Fortune's words drew rebuke from both the white and African American press, though some argued his words had been taken out of context and that he was not calling for McKinley's assassination. The Age at first opposed McKinley's second run for the presidency, but Fortune eventually supported him, likely with the hopes of receiving a federal appointment. He was called to work at the federal headquarters of the Republican National Committee in September 1900 and campaigned for McKinley in the Midwest, but was ultimately denied an appointment.

=== Relationship with Booker T. Washington ===
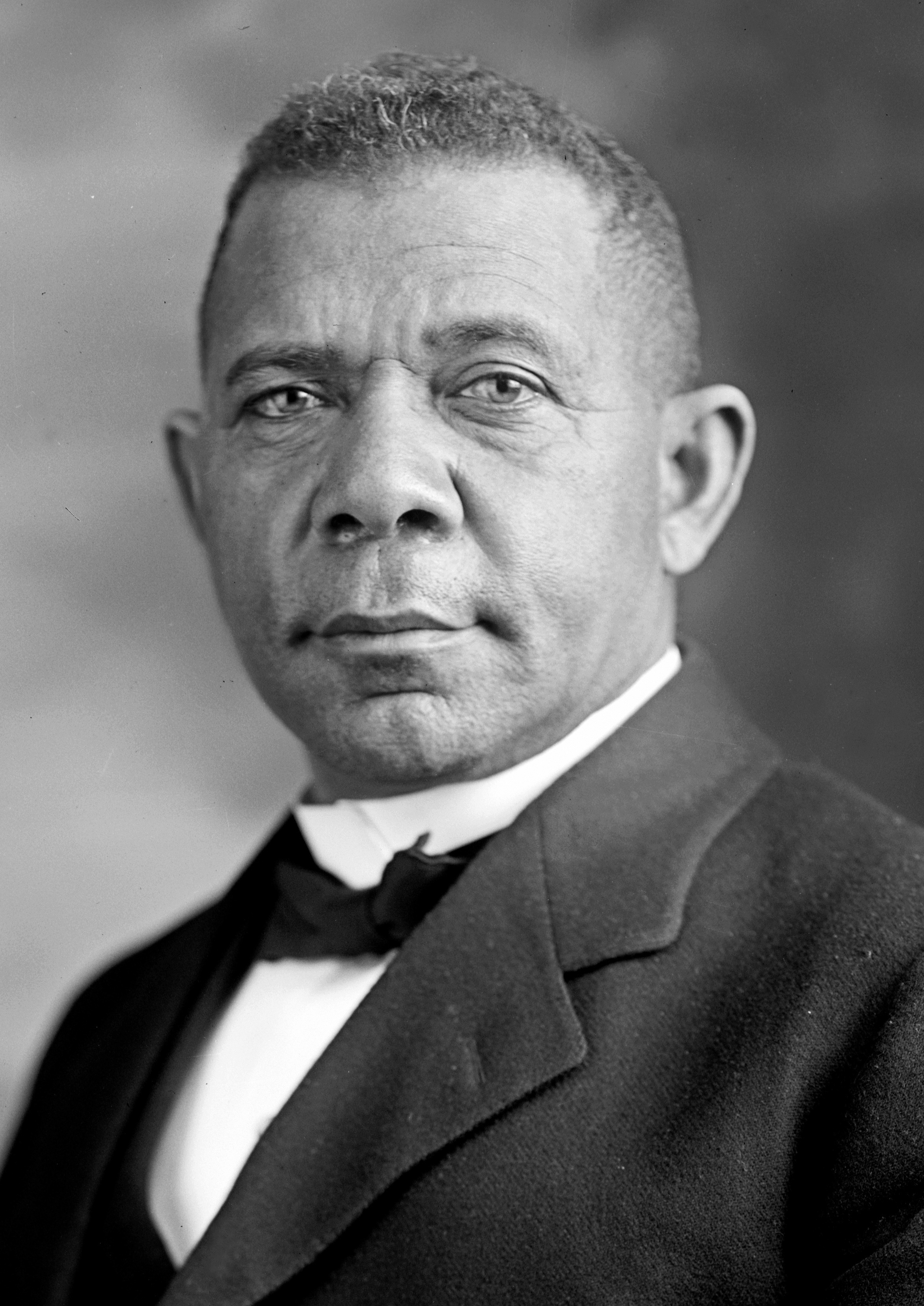
Booker T. Washington (pictured here in 1905) and Fortune were close friends in the late 19th century, but Fortune's alcoholism and Washington's rising prominence led to a fracturing of the relationship by the mid-1900s.

Fortune met Booker T. Washington sometime in the 1880s; the two developed a friendship while Fortune was on assignment in the South for the Sun. He traveled extensively in the American South in the 1890s, writing for the Age, Sun, and other newspapers, covering topics including the Tuskegee Institute, the Tillman movement, the role of African American preachers in politics, the back-to-Africa movement, chain gangs and convict leasing, and discrimination in the railroad system. Fortune first assumed the role of confidant and advisor to Washington in 1890; the friendship between Washington and Fortune strengthened throughout the 1890s and by 1898, the pair were writing letters to each other almost daily. Washington established the National Negro Business League in 1900 and named Fortune chair of the group's executive committee.

Fortune used his skills as writer and editor to assist Washington with the latter's publications, including writing the introduction for Washington's collection of speeches, Black-Belt Diamonds, editing and revising The Future of the American Negro, Sowing and Reaping, and The Story of My Life and Work, and ghostwriting A New Negro for a New Century and The Negro in Business. Fortune was paid for some of this work.

The Age never became a profitable venture and Washington became a financial lifeline for Fortune and the newspaper, paying the journalist for speeches, travel, and publishing content related to the Tuskegee Institute, as well as offering Fortune the occasional loan. (Note: Thornbrough writes Fortune's income from the Age covered approximately half of his living expenses.) He promoted Washington's views and the Institute through the Age and freelance work for other newspapers. Fortune's beliefs differed from Washington's. He disagreed with Washington's stances on topics such as literacy requirements for voting rights and criticized his friendly attitude toward Southern whites. Publicly, Fortune praised Washington's cordiality with white Southern leaders and defended him against African American critics. Editorials in the white press dubbed Fortune "the Afro-American agitator" and frequently contrasted him with the more reserved Washington. African American leaders who were critical of Washington, including W.E.B. Du Bois, and William Monroe Trotter, declared Fortune an "apostate", a "weakling", and "untrustworthy".

Fortune's health declined following his father's death in 1897, falling ill with mental health and stomach issues that rendered him unable to work. He recovered briefly but fell ill again in 1898; Washington loaned him funds while he was out of work. Fortune was stricken with rheumatism in 1899 and received a surgery for an unknown condition. He had also become increasingly reliant on alcohol, a condition about which Washington counseled temperance. Following a conference on race in Montgomery, Alabama, in 1900, at which there were discussions held about repealing the Fifteenth Amendment, Fortune made a series of speeches on disenfranchisement and wrote of the need for African Americans to use force to defend their rights if the law would not protect them. (Note: In a letter to the Brooklyn Daily Eagle, Fortune wrote, "I believe in law and the rule of law. When the law does not protect me, as it does not in the South; when the officers of the law join with the lawbreakers to deprive me of 'life and liberty', as they do in the South every day in the week, what am I to do? Accept it all meekly, without protest or resentment, and crave that those who so abuse me let me live and kiss the hem of their garments? Slaves do that sort of thing, and are worthy to be slaves, but free men, American freemen! Who expects them to do it?") He was criticized for his remarks and blamed for a race riot in the Tenderloin district of Manhattan by members of the white press.

=== Later years of the Age ===
Following Theodore Roosevelt's inauguration, Washington gained significant influence in the administration and fractures began appearing in his relationship with Fortune. The pair began falling out as Fortune struggled to reconcile his own beliefs with the positions maintained by Washington and published via Fortune's journalism, as well as Fortune's worsening alcoholism. Fortune was distrustful of Roosevelt but restrained his criticism in the Age in hopes of getting a federal appointment. The appointment did not come, in part due to the lack of an enthusiastic recommendation from Washington, who withheld, at least partially, due to reports of Fortune being publicly drunk. Fortune's federal appointment came in 1902 as a Special Immigrant Agent of the Treasury Department, tasked with studying race and trade conditions in Hawaii and the Philippines. Fortune suggested the time may be right for African American emigration to the islands, a prospect rejected by local residents. Upon returning to the US, Fortune found he would not be paid for his final weeks of travel as his appointment had only been for six months.

Backlash against Washington and his stances was growing among prominent African Americans in the early 1900s. Fortune was often targeted by Washington's opponents in the press, who called him Washington's tool and weak-willed. (Note: In 1903, the Chicago Conservator wrote, "We pity Tom Fortune because he is a great man fallen and is no more his former self on matters touching the liberties and rights of his race than a toad frog is like a tadpole, and while his old fashioned love and fire for his seem to have gone all his powers of reasoning and logical hot shot. Poor fellow.") The friendship between Fortune and Washington was irreparably damaged in 1904 after Fortune revealed Washington's role in voter disenfranchisement cases in Alabama, an effort which Washington had worked to keep concealed. Following the falling out, Fortune began attacking Roosevelt in the columns of the Age, though these attacks ceased shortly thereafter when Jerome Peterson, Fortune's business partner, was appointed consul in Venezuela. The Age endorsed Roosevelt in the election of 1904. In the summer of 1904, Fortune was working on The Negro in Business and assisting Fred R. Moore with The Colored American Magazine in addition to his work writing and operating the Age. Moore, meanwhile, reported to Washington episodes of Fortune's drinking.

Washington began increasing investment into the Age in 1905, allowing the paper to expand, but Fortune struggled to keep up with the work after attending conferences of the Negro Business League and Afro-American Council and became a "nervous wreck", a condition exacerbated by the return of Peterson and the ensuing financial strain from Peterson's salary. Accounting difficulties and late payments from Washington put Fortune and the Age in a financial crisis; both were bailed out again by Washington. Fortune used the Age to denounce the Niagara Movement's challenge to Washington's leadership and discredit his detractors, including Du Bois and Ida B. Wells. He also attacked Roosevelt for his failure to speak out against disenfranchisement and lynching, as well as his handling of the Brownsville affair, urging African American military members to leave the service and others not to enlist. Fortune independently published a collection of his poetry in 1905.

Washington's investment in the Age continued in 1906, though payments were late and left Fortune in a significant financial deficit. The paper incorporated in 1907 and Fortune was named president of the company. Washington was one of the firm's principal stockholders. Washington had publicly denied owning stakes in news outlets and said it would not be appropriate for him to own the press, thus requiring efforts to conceal his involvement in the Age. It was decided the Age should print its own copies and Washington demanded the paper expand to eight pages. Fortune struggled to keep up with the work but could not delegate responsibility. The Age quickly suffered financial difficulties and Fortune began experiencing severe mental distress. (Note: Thornbrough speculated there were several contributing factors to Fortune's deteriorating mental state: a lifetime of episodic depression, long-term financial distress, a feeling of failure as an advocate for his race, extended compromise on his personal morals in support of Booker T. Washington's aims, and his separation from his wife in 1906, all exacerbated by alcohol abuse.) Fortune sold his stake in the Age to Moore in October 1907 for US$7,000, the purchase financed by Washington.

=== Descent, recovery, and death ===
Fortune traveled to Chicago following the sale of the Age, gave an incoherent sermon at a local church, and attempted to purchase The Chicago Conservator and The Voice of the Negro. He invested in the latter, not knowing it was in significant debt. Increasingly concerned about Fortune's mental state and the possibility he would reveal Washington's ownership stake in the Age, Washington transferred his shares to secretary Emmett Jay Scott and published a statement saying Washington owned no stake in the paper. Fortune responded, revealing that even if Washington had divested, he had at one point owned 950 shares of the Age.

By the end of 1907 Fortune had returned to New York. He attempted to relaunch the Freeman as a monthly magazine, publishing the first issue in February 1908, but it lasted only a few months and Fortune was left destitute. Moore paid him US$15 per week to write for the Age and sought to keep Washington and Fortune on poor terms by reporting to Washington on Fortune's behavior. Fortune held the position at the Age for three weeks before quitting after a six-day binge drinking episode. He sold the promissory notes he had received for his stake in the Age to make ends meet and begged acquaintances for money to purchase food. He briefly worked for the Republican National Committee in 1908, writing in support of William Howard Taft's bid for the presidency, and in 1909 intermittently freelanced for various African American publications. Fortune's health improved in 1910 and he found work as an associate editor of The Philadelphia Tribune and reporter for the Amsterdam News, and wrote intermittently for the Age. His mental health had improved significantly by 1911 but the Tribune could no longer afford to pay him, and he returned to the Age, where he worked as an associate editor until 1914. He left after failing to be paid for his work. Fortune bounced around from publication to publication after leaving the Age, writing for The Washington Sun, the Harrisburg Advocate-Verdict, the Indianapolis Ledger, Philadelphia Tribune, Amsterdam News, and The Colored American Review. Fortune lived in Trenton and Lawrenceville, New Jersey, during these years and continued to have bouts of depression and anxiety that made it difficult to work. In 1917, he was appointed assistant director and secretary of the Negro Welfare Bureau of New Jersey that helped Southern migrant African Americans find housing and jobs.

Fortune continued to freelance and in 1919, began writing editorials and opinion columns for the Norfolk Journal and Guide. He became the editor of the Negro World, the official publication of Marcus Garvey's Universal Negro Improvement Association and African Communities League, in 1923. Fortune did not share Garvey's ideology, but admired Garvey's ability to mobilize African Americans.

Fortune collapsed in the spring of 1928 and was taken to his son's home in Philadelphia, where he continued to dictate editorials from his bed. He died on June 2. Fortune was eulogized as the "dean of Negro journalists" and his work as "the voice of the Negro". (Note: Kelly Miller, writing for the Amsterdam News, said Fortune, "represented the best developed journalist that the Negro race has produced in the Western World. His pen knew but one theme—the rights of man. His editorials were accepted throughout the journalistic world as the voice of the Negro".)

== Family and personal life ==
Fortune and his wife, Carrie, had five children. His first two children died in infancy and Fortune doted on his daughter, Jessie. A son, Stewart, died in 1888. His youngest child, Frederick, was born in 1891. Fortune and Carrie separated in 1906, with Fortune citing differences in "temperament" as the key cause. Carrie moved to an apartment in Harlem which Fortune paid for. In 1907, he suggested divorce and was having an affair with another woman. He proposed reuniting with Carrie in 1912, but she declined, at least partially out of concern for caring for Fortune during bouts of poor mental health.

In 1901, Fortune purchased a home in Red Bank, New Jersey, which he named Maple Hall. His lack of funds led the home to be sold under court order in 1910. The house was named a National Historic Landmark and added to the National Register of Historic Places in 1976. It was added to the New Jersey Register of Historic Places in 1979.

Fortune was a member of the African Methodist Episcopal Church. He enjoyed roller skating, poetry, and cycling.

== Selected works ==
- Fortune, T. Thomas (1884). Black and White: Land, Labor, and Politics in the South. New York, New York: Fords, Howard, & Hulbert.
- Fortune, T. Thomas (1969) [First published 1905]. Dreams of Life: Miscellaneous Poems. Miami, Florida: Mnemosyne Publishing Company.
- Fortune, T. Thomas (2008). Alexander, Shawn Leigh (ed.). T. Thomas Fortune, the Afro-American agitator: a collection of writings, 1880-1928. Gainesville, Florida: University Press of Florida. ISBN 9780813032320.
- Fortune, T. Thomas (2014). Weinfeld, Daniel R. (ed.). After War Times: An African American Childhood in Reconstruction-Era Florida. Tuscaloosa, Alabama: University of Alabama Press. ISBN 978-0-8173-1836-9.
