= Daniel Wallace Culp =

American educator, physician, and pastor

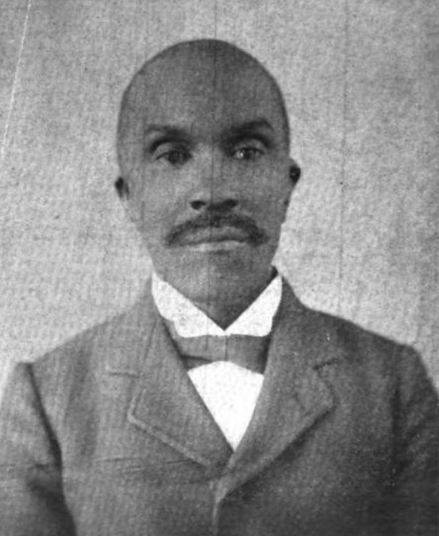
- Born: February 29, 1852; Union County, South Carolina, US
- Died: October 11, 1918 (aged 66); Augusta, Georgia, US
- Occupations: Physician, pastor, and educator
- Known for: Twentieth Century Negro Literature; or, a Cyclopedia of Thought on the Vital Topics Relating to the American Negro

Daniel Wallace Culp (February 29, 1852 – October 11, 1918) was an doctor, pastor, and educator in Florida, Alabama, and Tennessee. He is best known for his book about notable African Americans. He was the first graduate of Biddle Memorial Institute, now Johnson C. Smith University. He was African American.

== Early life and education ==
Culp was born into slavery on February 29, 1852, in Union County, South Carolina. His parents were Marilla "Martha" Hill and Benjamin Culp. Culp and his mother were enslaved by Christopher Brandon, who was so lenient that other whites referred to the people he enslaved as "Brandon's free Negroes". Young Culp was a favorite of Brandon, who used to have the youth share his bed and also taught him to read.

He attended the Unionville Academy in Union, South Carolina. In 1869, he enrolled in the Biddle Memorial Institute in Charlotte, North Carolina. When he was eighteen years old in 1872, Culp joined the Second Presbyterian Church in Charlotte. He was the first graduate of the Biddle Institute in 1876, receiving a B.A. in classics.

He then attended Princeton Theological Seminary, graduating with an A.M. in 1879. While at the seminary, he also took classes in psychology and the history of philosophy at Princeton College, to the distress of some racist students who were attending Princeton from the South. Despite protests from these students and their parents, Culp refused to withdraw from Princeton College. The Presbytery of Fairfield issued Culp with a license on December 4, 1879; he was ordained on December 5, 1879.

Culp enrolled in the University of Michigan's medical school in 1880. He completed his medical education at Ohio Medical College (now the University of Cincinnati) graduating with an M.D. in 1891 with honors.

== Career ==
=== Ministry ===
After graduating from seminary, Culp became a pastor under the Freedmen's Board of the Northern Presbyterian Church. He was assigned to the Presbyterian Church in Laurens, South Carolina. He was the pastor of a church in Pitts, South Carolina, followed by Mt. Pisgah, South, Carolina, and Sloan Chapel from 1879 to 1880. From 1881 to 1885, he was pastor-elect of Laura Street Church, also known as Third Church. in Jacksonville, Florida.

Culp became a member of the General Congregational Association of Florida. In 1886, the American Missionary Association asked him to lead a church in Alabama. As a result, he led a congregational church Florence, Alabama from 1887 to 1888, followed by accepting an assignment at the Knowles Street First Congregational Church inNashville, Tennessee from 1888 to 1890.

In 1881, federal officeholders asked Culp to lead a prayer during Jacksonville's memorial ceremony for President James A. Garfield. At the time, Culp was an inexperienced speaker and was reported to stammer through 35 minutes of a "boring" prayer.

=== Education ===
Culp served as principal of Stanton Institute in Jacksonville, Florida, starting in 1881 to 1885. James Weldon Johnson, a student at Stanton Institute, later wrote that Culp was an unorganized teacher and administrator, resulting in numerous parents removing their students and Culp's eventual dismissal. Next, he helped form the Florida Normal and Industrial Institute in Lake City, Florida and was one of its instructors.

=== Medicine ===
After medical school, Culp practiced in Nashville, Tennessee from 1891 to 1892. Next, he was superintendent and resident physician in charge of the Freedmen's Hospital in Augusta, Georgia, but controversy ensued with white doctors protesting. He established a medical practice in Augusta, Georgia from 1892 to 1894 before practicing in Palatka, Florida from 1894 to 1907; Plant City, Florida from 1907 to 1911. He then served as superintendent of the Negro State League for the Prevention of Tuberculosis. In 1899, he wrote and published a thirty-page catechism on smallpox and vaccination. Culp returned to Augusta where he practice medicine from 1911 until he died in 1918.

=== Editor ===
In 1902, Culp edited Twentieth Century Negro Literature; or, a Cyclopedia of Thought on the Vital Topics Relating to the American Negro. His book, which features photographs and biographies of prominent African Americans, is an important contribution to early African American literature.

== Personal life ==
Culp was married to Mary Emily McKenzie Jefferson in Jacksonville, Florida on August 10, 1884. She was a public school teacher. They had two children, Julian McKenzie Culp and Charlotte Marilla Culp.

Culp died from influenza in Augusta, Georgia on October 11, 1918, at the age of 67 years. He was buried in Mount Olive Cemetery in Jacksonville, Florida.

== Publications ==
- Dr. Culp's Catechism on Smallpox and Vaccination. Tampa, 1899.
- Twentieth Century Negro Literature; or, a Cyclopedia of Thought on the Vital Topics Relating to the American Negro. Toronto: J. L. Nichols & Co., 1902.

== See also ==
- Monroe Work
