= New York Society for the Promotion of Education Among Colored Children =

The New York Society for the Promotion of Education Among Colored Children was an organization supporting schools for African-Americans in New York City. It was founded in 1847 by Charles L. Reason and Charles Bennett Ray It ceased operations by 1854.

It was incorporated by the New York Assembly in 1847 and its schools were overseen by the Board of Education. Membership was open and cost $2. It was administered by trustees and its schools open to anyone.

The group was led by African-Americans. Charles B. Ray served as the organization's president. James McCune Smith served as treasurer.

Elizabeth Jennings Graham taught at a school run by the society.

The society organized a school on Thomas Street and another in Center.
