= Gunner (name) =

Gunner is a nickname, given name, and surname. Notable people with the name include:

== People with the nickname ==
- Gunner Kelly (1906–1977), Australian police officer
- Gunner McGrath (born 1978), founder, lead singer and guitarist of the punk rock band Much The Same
- Gunner Moir (1879–1939), English heavyweight boxer
- Bob Prince (1916–1985), former Pittsburgh Pirates baseball announcer nicknamed "The Gunner"
- Matt Reilly (footballer) (1874–1954), Irish goalkeeper
- Thomas Bland Strange (1831–1925), British major general known as "Gunner Jingo"

== People with the given name ==
- Gunner Berg (1764–1827), Norwegian politician
- Gunner Britton (born 2000), American football player
- Gunner DeLay (born 1963), American politician
- Lone gunner of Flesquières (1887–1917), Possibly-mythical German soldier
- Byron Gunner (1857–1922), American minister and activist
- Charles Gunner (1853–1934), English cricketer
- Harry Gunner (born 1944), American football player
- John Gunner (1884–1918), English cricketer
- Liz Gunner (born 1941), Academic
- Marilyn Gunner, American physics professor
- Mary Frances Gunner (1894–1953), American dramatist
- Michael Gunner (born 1976), Australian politician
- Gunner Higham (1887 – after 1920), English footballer
- Gunner Kelly (1906–1977), Australian police officer
- Gunner Kiel (born 1993), American football player
- Gunner Lindberg (born 1975), American murderer
- Gunner Maldonado (born 2001), American football player
- Gunner McGrath (born 1978), American singer
- Gunner Moir (1879–1939), English boxer
- Gunner Nielsen (born 1944), Danish rower
- Gunner Olesen (1916–1979), Danish gymnast
- Gunner Olszewski (born 1996), American football player
- Gunner Møller Pedersen (born 1943), Danish composer
- Gunner Stahl, American photographer
- Gunner Stockton (born 2004), American football player
- Gunner Wright (born 1973), American actor

== People with the surname ==
- Byron Gunner (1857–1922), American minister and activist
- Marilyn Gunner, American physicist
- Mary Frances Gunner (1894–1953), African-American playwright and community leader
- Michael Gunner (born 1976), Australian politician

== See also ==
- Gunner (disambiguation)
- Gunnar
