= Niagara Movement =

African-American civil rights organization founded in 1905

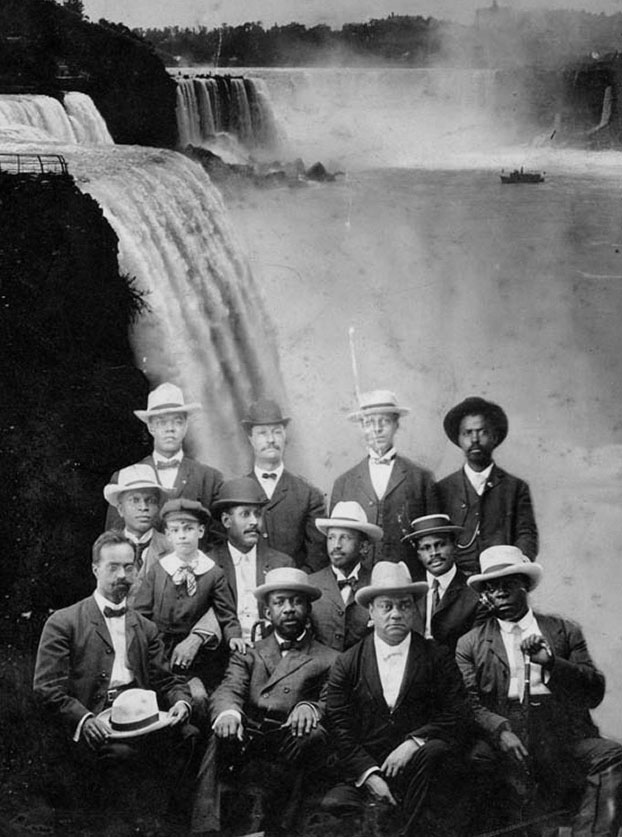
A photo illustration of some of the attendees at the first Niagara Conference. Top row, left to right: H.A. Thompson, New York; Alonzo F. Herndon, Georgia; John Hope, Georgia, (possibly James R.L. Diggs). Second row, left to right: Fred McGhee, Minnesota; Norris B. Herndon; J. Max Barber, Illinois; W.E.B. Du Bois, Atlanta; Robert Bonner, Massachusetts, (bottom row: left to right) Henry L. Baily, Washington, D.C.; Clement G. Morgan, Massachusetts; W.H.H. Hart, Washington, D.C.; and B.S. Smith, Kansas. (1905 silver gelatin print.)

The Niagara Movement (NM) was a civil rights organization founded in 1905 by a group of activists—many of whom were among the vanguard of African-American lawyers in the United States—led by W. E. B. Du Bois and William Monroe Trotter with Mary Burnett Talbert. The Niagara Movement was organized to oppose racial segregation and disenfranchisement. Its members felt the policy of accommodation and conciliation, without voting rights, promoted by Booker T. Washington, was "unmanly". It was named for the "mighty current" of change the group wanted to effect and took Niagara Falls as its symbol. The group did not meet in Niagara Falls, New York, but planned its first conference for nearby Buffalo during the week of July 9, 1905. To avoid a possible racist protest, Du Bois instead hired a small hotel across the border in Fort Erie, Ontario, Canada. The Niagara Movement was the immediate predecessor of the NAACP.

== Background ==
During the Reconstruction Era that followed the American Civil War, African Americans had an unprecedented level of civil freedom and civic participation. In the South, for the first time the former slaves could vote, hold public office, and contract for their labor. With the end of Reconstruction in the 1870s, their freedoms began to narrow. From 1890 to 1908, all the Southern states ratified new constitutions or laws that disenfranchised most blacks and significantly restricted their political and civil rights. After Democrats regained control of state legislatures they passed laws imposing legal racial segregation in public facilities. These policies were entrenched after the United States Supreme Court in 1896 ruled in Plessy v. Ferguson that laws requiring "separate but equal" facilities were constitutional. The separate facilities for African Americans were often shabby, or they did not exist at all.

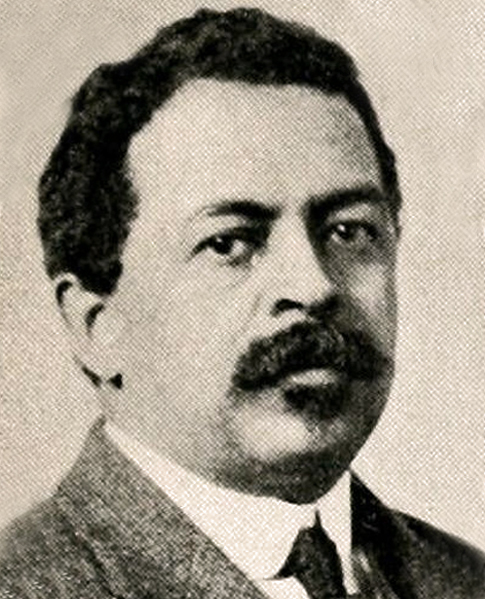
William Monroe Trotter, 1915 photomechanical print

The most prominent African-American spokesman during the 1890s was Booker T. Washington, leader of Alabama's Tuskegee Institute. In an 1895 speech in Atlanta, Georgia, Washington discussed what became known as the Atlanta Compromise. He believed that Southern African-Americans should not agitate for political rights (such as exercising the right to vote or having equal treatment under the law) as long as they were provided economic opportunities and basic rights of due process. He believed they needed to focus on education and work, to raise their race. Washington politically dominated the National Afro-American Council, the first nationwide African-American civil rights organization.

By the turn of the 20th century, other activists within the African-American community began demanding a challenge to racist government policies and higher goals for their people than those advocated by Washington. They believed that Washington was "accommodationist". Opponents included Northerner W. E. B. Du Bois, then a professor at Atlanta University, and William Monroe Trotter, a Boston activist who in 1901 founded the Boston Guardian newspaper as a platform for radical activism. In 1902 and 1903 groups of activists sought to gain a larger voice in the debate at the conventions of the National Afro-American Council, but they were marginalized because the conventions were dominated by Washington supporters (also known as Bookerites). Trotter in July 1903 orchestrated a confrontation with Washington in Boston, a stronghold of activism, that resulted in a minor melee and the arrest of Trotter and others; the event garnered national headlines.

In January 1904, Washington, with funding assistance from white philanthropist Andrew Carnegie, organized a meeting in New York to unite African American and civil rights spokesmen. Trotter was not invited, but Du Bois and a few other activists were. Du Bois was sympathetic to the activist cause and suspicious of Washington's motives; he noted that the number of activists invited was small relative to the number of Bookerites. The meeting laid the foundation for a committee to include both Washington and Du Bois, but it quickly fractured. Du Bois resigned in July 1905. By this time, both Du Bois and Trotter recognized the need for a well-organized anti-Washington activist group.

== Founding ==
Along with Du Bois and Trotter, Fredrick McGhee of St. Paul, Minnesota and Charles Edwin Bentley of Chicago also recognized the need for a national activist group. The foursome organized a conference to be held July 11–13, 1905, in Buffalo, New York, with Buffalo resident Mary Burnett Talbert. 59 carefully selected anti-Bookerites were invited to attend; 29 showed up, including prominent community leaders and a notable number of lawyers. At the last minute, to avoid disruption, the meeting was moved to the Erie Beach Hotel in Fort Erie, Ontario, Canada, across the Niagara River from Buffalo.

The organization founded at this meeting chose Du Bois as its general secretary and Cincinnati lawyer George H. Jackson as treasurer. It set up committees to oversee progress on the organization's goals. State chapters would advance local agendas and disseminate information about the organization and its goals. Its name was chosen to reflect the site of its first meeting and to be representative of a "mighty current" of change its leaders sought to bring about. Seventeen founders were each appointed as state secretary to individually represent 17 of the states of the union:

- Massachusetts – CG Morgan
- Georgia – John Hope
- Arkansas – FB Coffin
- Illinois – CE Bentley
- Kansas – B. S. Smith
- D.C. – L. M. Henshaw
- New York – George Frazier Miller
- Virginia – James Robert Lincoln Diggs
- Colorado – C. A. Franklin
- Pennsylvania – G. W. Mitchell
- Rhode Island – Byron Gunner
- New Jersey – T. A. Spraggins
- Maryland – G.R. Waller
- Iowa – G. H. Woodson
- Tennessee – Richard Hill
- Minnesota – F. L. McGhee
- West Virginia – J. R. Clifford

=== Founders ===
The 29 founders who traveled to the inaugural meeting of the Niagara Movement came from 14 states and became known as "The Original Twenty-nine":

1. James Robert Lincoln Diggs – College president; pastor; ninth African American to receive a doctorate in the United States
2. Dr. Henry Lewis "H. L." Bailey (January 17, 1866 – July 16, 1933) – Teacher and medical doctor.
3. William Justin "W. Justin" Carter, Sr. (May 28, 1866 – March 23, 1947) – Pennsylvania lawyer; civil right activist; scholar; early NAACP member
4. William Henry "W. H." Scott (June 15, 1848 – June 27, 1910) – Born to slavery, soldier, teacher, bookseller, Baptist pastor, activist, founder of Massachusetts Racial Protective League and the National Independent Political League
5. Isaac F. "I.F." Bradley, Sr. (1862 – 1938) – Assistant county attorney, Wyandotte County; justice of the peace; judge; publisher and editor of The Wyandotte Echo (1930 – 1938); father of Isaac F. Bradley, Jr., who was assistant attorney general for Kansas (1937-39)
6. Alonzo F. Herndon – Born to slavery; entrepreneur; one of the first African-American millionaires in the United States
7. William Henry "W. H." Richards (January 15, 1856 – 1941) – Lawyer and law professor; secured funding from Congress, with William Henry Harrison Hart, for first law school building at Howard University; activist; alderman; mayor;William H. Richards: A remarkable life of a remarkable man, was a biography by Julia B. Nelson, published about 1900
8. Brown Sylvester "B. S." Smith – Kansas City lawyer and City Councillor, activist. Born to parents who were born into slavery; orphaned young.
9. Frederick L. McGhee
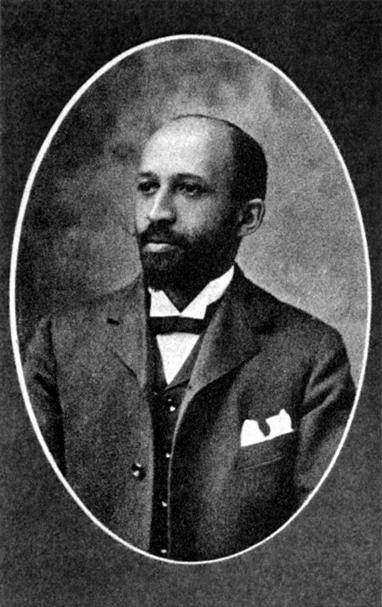
  W. E. B. Du Bois, 1903 portrait
10. William Monroe Trotter
11. Garnett Russell "G.R." Waller (February 17, 1857 – March 7, 1941) – Shoemaker; pastor
12. Harvey A. Thompson — H. A. Thompson (July 24, 1863 – ), Columbus, Ohio native; Fisk University, Le Moyne College and Meharry Medical College alumni; Ninth United States Cavalry (1883 – 1888); adjutant and first lieutenant of the Eighth Illinois (1894); Chicago political and business figure; clerkship at the central police station; married Frances Gowins
13. William Henry Harrison Hart — Born to a white slave trader; jailed activist; secured funding from Congress, with W. H. Richards, for first law school building at Howard University; law professor; worked for United States Treasury, United States Department of Agriculture; assistant librarian of Congress; first black lawyer appointed as special U.S. District Attorney for the District of Columbia
14. Lafayette M. Hershaw
15. W. E. B. Du Bois – Co-founder of the NAACP
16. Charles E. Bentley
17. Clement G. Morgan
18. Freeman H. M. Murray
19. J. Max Barber
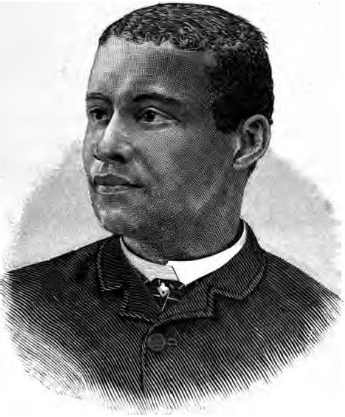
  H. C. Smith, Men of Mark sketch.
20. George Frazier Miller (November 28, 1864 – May 9, 1943) — rector of St. Augustine's Episcopal Church, Brooklyn; socialist; civil rights activist
21. George Henry "G. H." Woodson (December 15, 1865 – July 7, 1933) — Criminal trial attorney, born to newly emancipated slaves; co-founder and president of both the Iowa Negro Bar Association in 1901 and the National Negro Bar Association, in 1925, which became the National Bar Association (NBA), of which he also served as president emeritus; President Coolidge appointed Woodson chairman of the first all-Negro commission ever sent overseas, with a mandate to investigate the economic conditions of the Virgin Islands (illustrated report available from the U. S. department of labor archives)
22. James S. Madden — Bookkeeper; activist; desegregationist; worked to establish the Chicago branch of the Niagara Movement with Charles E. Bentley; Provident Hospital trustee; assisted in the founding of the Equal Opportunity League
23. Henry C. Smith – Musician, composer; civil rights activist; Ohio deputy oil inspector; co-founder and editor of The Cleveland Gazette
24. Emery T. "E.T." Morris (1849 - 1924) — Massachusetts deputy sealer of weights and measures; druggist; rail porter; stationary steam engineer; lay teacher who created extensive antislavery libraries in New England; founder of the Boston branch of the Movement
25. Richard Hill (October 12, 1864 – ) – Native of Nashville, Tennessee; teacher and city schools supervisor; insurance and real estate entrepreneur; served as NM Secretary for Tennessee; father of civil rights activist and lawyer Richard Hill, Jr.
26. Robert H. Bonner – Beverly, Massachusetts artist; Yale University alumni; Colored Yale Quartette singer; lawyer; long associated the Trotter family
27. Byron Gunner (July 4, 1857 – February 9, 1922) – Congregational minister; president of the National Equal Rights League; later a strong ally of William Monroe Trotter; Rhode Island Niagara Movement secretary; father of playwright Mary Frances Gunner
28. Edwin Bush "E.B." Jourdain — Boston lawyer; hosted "the New Bedford Annex for Boston Radicals"; father of journalist, activist and first black alderman of Evanston, Illinois Edwin B. Jourdain, Jr.
29. George W. Mitchell – Washington, DC attorney; Howard University Latin and Greek professor; Pennsylvania NM secretary; father of lawyer and real estate investor George Henry Mitchell

=== Inaugural meeting location ===
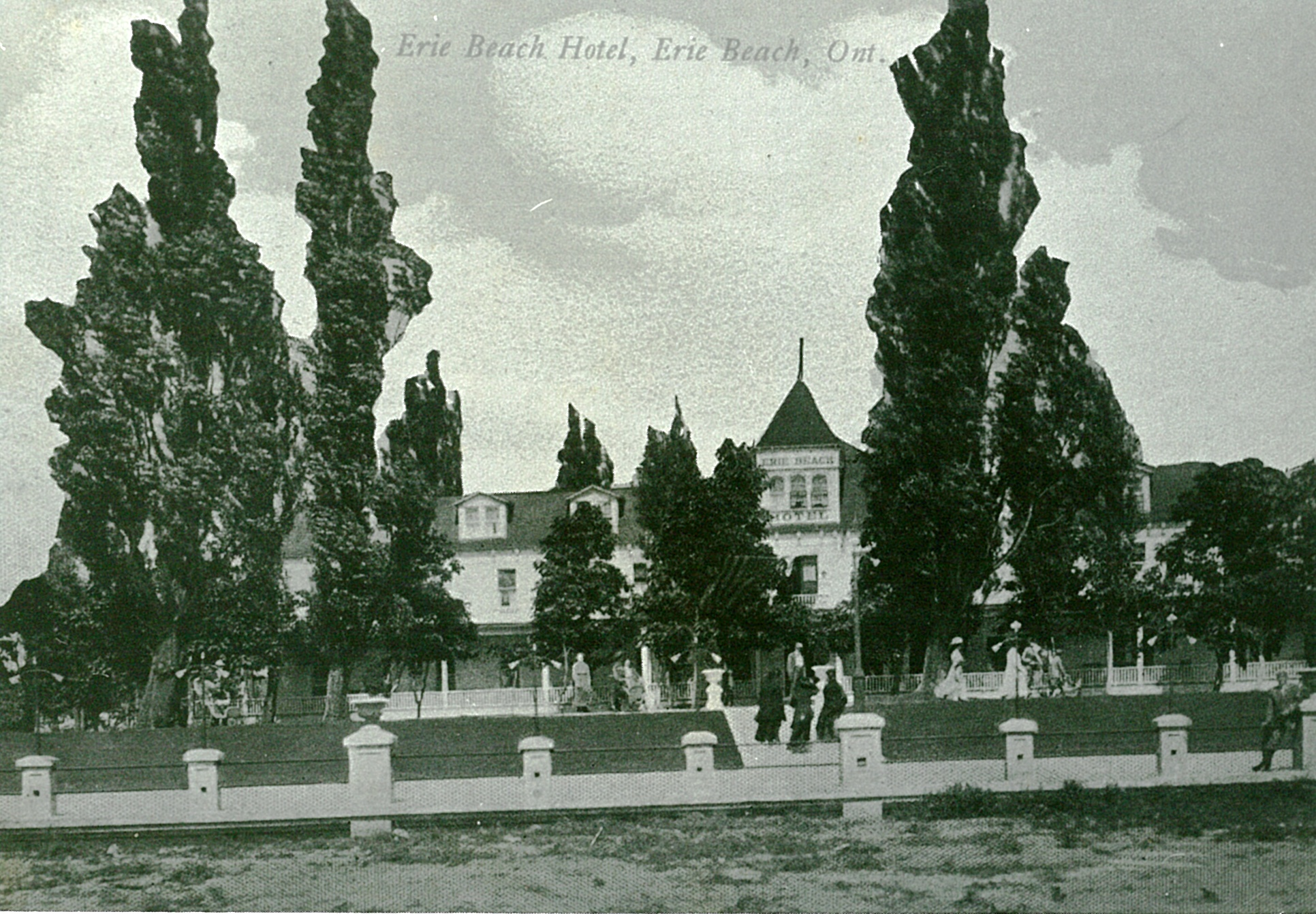
Erie Beach Hotel, Fort Erie, Ontario, Canada. Destroyed by fire in 1975. Not to be confused with current Erie Beach Hotel in Port Dover, Ontario.

The First Niagara Conference was originally scheduled for Buffalo, New York, but because of threatened disruptions from partisans of the politically powerful Booker T. Washington fled at the last minute to the Erie Beach Hotel in Fort Erie, Ontario, Canada. Du Bois described the meeting as "secret". One Bookerite, Clifford Plummer, traveled to Buffalo to check up on the proceedings, looked around, and "happily" reported back that there was no conference.

To disguise this, it was said that they were refused accommodation in Buffalo. However, no evidence supports this. According to contemporary reports, Buffalo hotels complied with a statewide anti-discrimination law passed in 1895, and in a recent article it is called an "unlikely ... legend".

=== Declaration of Principles ===
The attendees of the inaugural meeting drafted a "Declaration of Principles," primarily the work of Du Bois and Trotter. The group's philosophy contrasted with the conciliatory approach by Booker T. Washington, who proposed patience over militancy. The declaration defined the group's philosophy and demands: politically, socially and economically. It described the progress made by "Negro-Americans",

"particularly the increase of intelligence, the buy-in of property, the checking of crime, the uplift in home life, the advance in literature and art, and the demonstration of constructive and executive ability in the conduct of great religious, economic and educational institutions."

It called for blacks to be granted manhood suffrage, for equal treatment for all American citizens alike. Very specifically, it demanded equal economic opportunities, in the rural districts of the South, where many blacks were trapped by sharecropping in a kind of indentured servitude to whites. This resulted in "virtual slavery". The Niagara Movement wanted all African Americans in the South to have the ability to "earn a decent living".

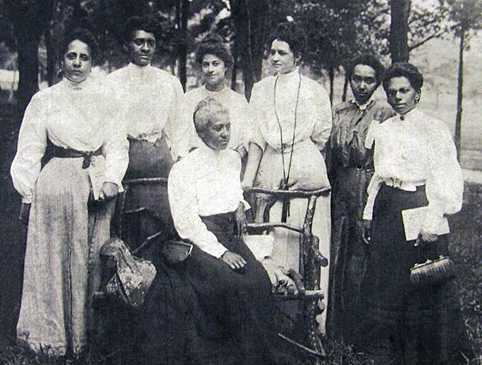
Women at the 1906 Niagara Movement Conference at Harpers Ferry: Mrs. Gertrude Wright Morgan (seated) and (left to right) Mrs. O.M. Waller, Mrs. H.F.M. Murray, Mrs. Mollie Lewis Kelan, Mrs. Ida D. Bailey, Miss Sadie Shorter, and Mrs. Charlotte Hershaw.

On the subject of education, the authors declared that not only should it be free, but it should also be made compulsory. Higher education, they declared, should be governed independently of class or race, and they demanded action to be taken to improve "high school facilities." This they emphasized: "either the United States will destroy ignorance, or ignorance will destroy the United States." They demanded for judges to be selected independently of their race, and for convicted criminals, white or black, to be given equal punishments for their respective crimes.

In his address to the nation, W. E. B. Du Bois stated, "We are not more lawless than the white race; we [are] more often arrested, convicted and mobbed. We want justice, even for criminals and outlaws." He called for the abolition of the convict lease system. Established after the Civil War before southern states built prisons, convicts were leased out to work as cheap laborers for "railway contractors, mining companies and those who farm large plantations." Southern states had passed laws targeting blacks and leasing them out to pay off fines or fees they could not manage. The system continued, earning money for local jurisdictions and the state from leasing out prisoners. There was little oversight, and many prisoners were abused and worked to death. Urging a return to the faith of "our fathers," the declaration appealed for every person to be considered equal and free.

The declaration also targeted the treatment blacks received from labor unions, often oppressed and not fully protected by their employers nor granted permanent employment. It validated the already announced affirmation that such protest against outright injustice would not cease until such discrimination did. Secondly, Du Bois and Trotter stated the irrationality of discriminating based on one's "physical peculiarities", whether it be place of birth or color of skin. Perhaps one's ignorance, or immorality, poverty or diseases are legitimate excuses, but not the matters over which individuals have no control. Near its end, the document condemns the Jim Crow laws, the rejection of blacks for enlistment in the Navy and by the military academies, the non-enforcement of the 13th, 14th and 15th Amendments protecting the rights of blacks, and the "unchristian" behaviors of churches that segregate and show prejudice to their black brothers. The Declaration thanked those who "stand for equality" and the advancement of this cause.

=== Opposition ===
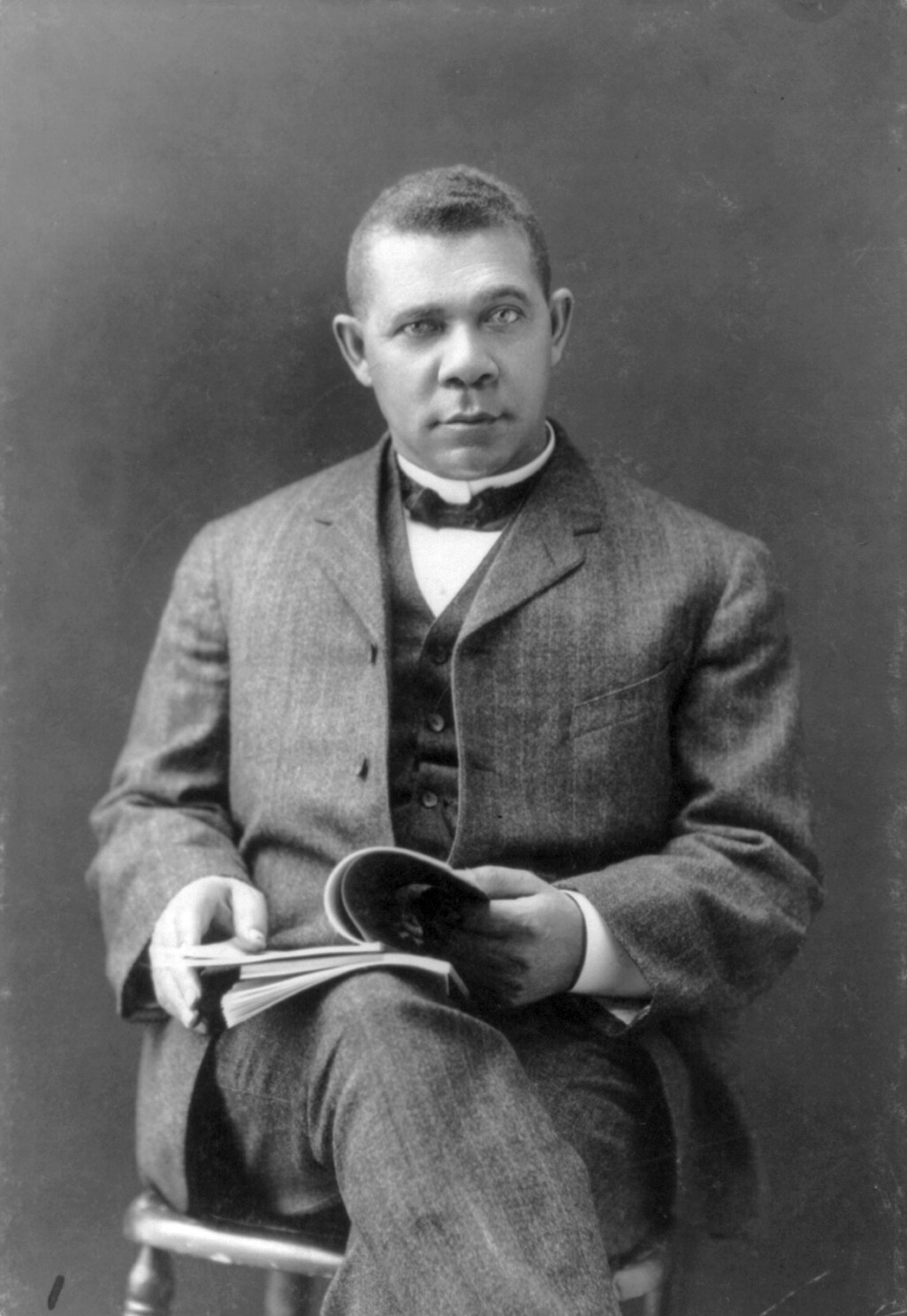
Booker T. Washington, 1903 portrait

Booker T. Washington and his supporters tried to discourage growth of this rival movement. Washington, Thomas Fortune, and Charles Anderson met after learning of the Movement's formation, and agreed to suppress news of it in the black press. They acquired supporters in Archibald Grimké and Kelly Miller, two moderates who had been friendly with Trotter, but had not been invited by Du Bois to the convention (Grimké was hired by Fortune's New York Age). The Age editorialized that the Movement was little more than an attempt to tear down the house that Washington had labored to set up. A Boston supporter of Washington convinced the printer of Trotter's Guardian to withdraw his services, but Trotter managed to continue printing anyway. Prominent white activists, including Francis Jackson Garrison and Oswald Garrison Villard (family of abolitionist William Lloyd Garrison, a hero of Trotter), refused to attend Trotter-organized commemorations of their father's birth centennial. They chose a celebration organized by Bookerites.

Despite Washington's attempts at suppression, Du Bois reported at the end of 1905 that a number of black publications had published accounts of the Movement's activities, and it received further publicity as a consequence of Bookerite press attacks against it. Washington also attacked the Constitution League, a multi-racial civil rights group that was also opposed to his accommodationist policies. The Niagara Movement made common cause with this organization.

== Meetings ==
- Scheduled for Buffalo, New York, but because of threatened disruptions from partisans of the politically powerful Booker T. Washington at the last minute to rescheduled for the Erie Beach Hotel in Fort Erie in Ontario, Canada
- Harpers Ferry, West Virginia (1906)
- Boston, Massachusetts (1907)
- Oberlin, Ohio (1908)
- Sea Isle City, New Jersey (1909)

After the initial meeting, delegates returned to their home territories to establish local chapters. By mid-September 1905, they had established chapters in 21 states, and the organization had 170 members by year's end. Du Bois founded a magazine, The Moon, in an attempt to establish an official mouthpiece for the organization. Due to lack of funding, it failed after a few months of publication. A second publication, The Horizon, was started in 1907 and survived until 1910.

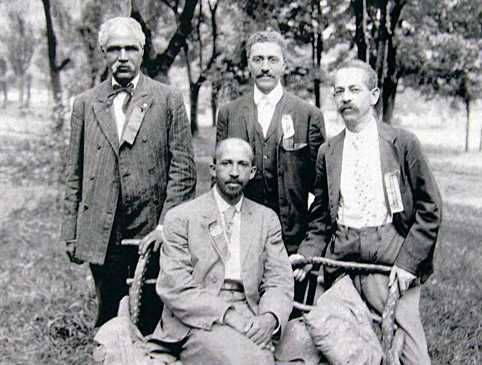
Niagara Movement leaders W. E. B. Du Bois (seated), and (left to right) J. R. Clifford (who organized the 2nd meeting), L. M. Hershaw, and F. H. M. Murray at Harpers Ferry.

The movement's second meeting, the first to be held on U.S. soil and arguably the movement's high point, took place at Harpers Ferry, West Virginia, the site of abolitionist John Brown's 1859 raid. The three-day gathering, from August 15 to 18, 1906, took place at the campus of Storer College (now part of Harpers Ferry National Historical Park). The Hill Top House Hotel hosted many of the guests. Convention attendees discussed how to secure civil rights for African Americans, and the meeting was later described by Du Bois as "one of the greatest meetings that American Negroes ever held." Attendees walked from Storer College to the nearby Murphy Family farm, relocation site of the historic fort where John Brown's quest to end slavery reached its bloody climax. Once there, they removed their shoes and socks to honor the hallowed ground and participated in a ceremony of remembrance.

Several of the organization's chapters made substantive contributions to the advance of civil rights in 1906. The Massachusetts chapter successfully lobbied against state legislation for the segregation of railroad cars, but was unable to stop the state from helping to fund the Jamestown Exposition, a commemoration of the founding of racially motivated Jamestown, Virginia, in which Virginia sought to limit black admission. The Illinois chapter convinced Chicago theater critics to ignore a production of The Clansman.

During the early months of 1906 friction began to develop between Du Bois and Trotter over the admission of women to the organization. Du Bois supported the idea, and Trotter opposed it, but eventually relented, and the matter was smoothed over during the 1906 meeting. Their division became more significant when Trotter split with longtime supporter and Movement member Clement Morgan over Massachusetts politics and control of the local Movement chapter, with Du Bois siding with the latter. When the Movement met in Boston in 1907 Du Bois not only admitted Grimké and Miller to the organization, he reappointed Morgan to a leading position in the organization. Further attempts to heal the rift failed, and Trotter then resigned from the Movement.

In 1906 there were several proposals floated in the black press that the Movement be merged with other organizations. None of these proposals got off the ground, with the only substance being a meeting between the Movement's Washington, DC, chapter and members of the Bookerite National Afro-American Council.

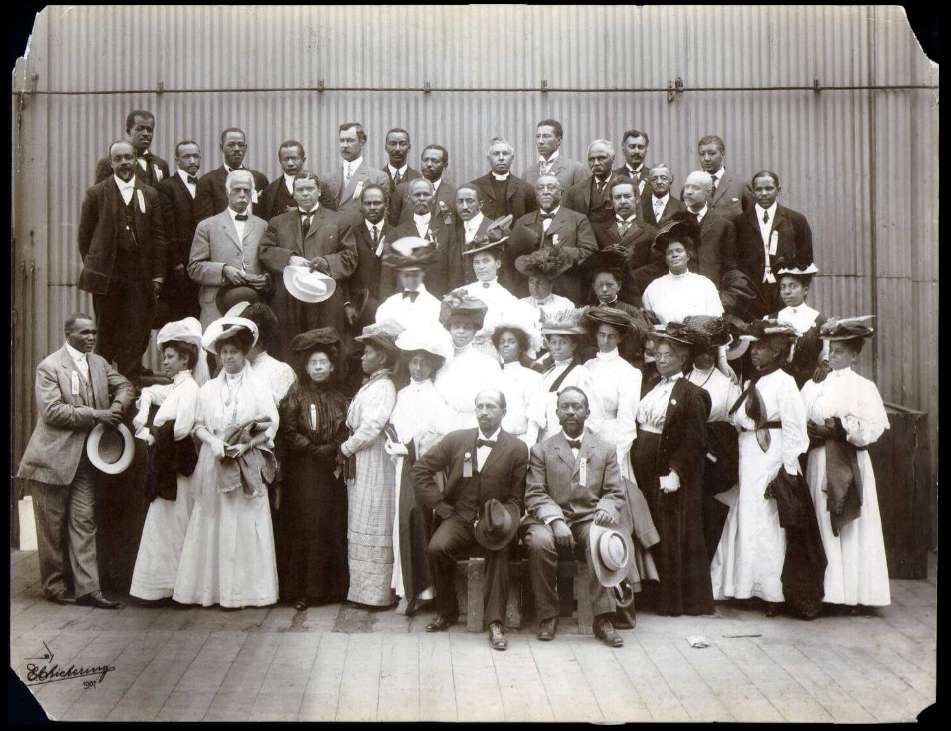
Delegates to the Niagara Movement meeting in Boston, Massachusetts in 1907

The Movement, in conjunction with the Constitution League (which took Du Bois on as a director), began organizing legal challenges to segregationist laws in early 1907. For an organization with a limited budget, this was an expensive proposition: the single case they mounted challenging Virginia's railroad segregation law put the organization into debt.

Du Bois had sought to return to Harpers Ferry for the 1907 annual meeting, but Storer College refused to grant them permission, claiming the group's presence in 1906 had been followed by financial and political pressure from its supporters to distance itself from them. The 1907 meeting was held in Boston, with conflicting attendance reports. Du Bois claimed 800 attendees, while the Bookerite Washington Bee claimed only about 100 in attendance. The convention published an "Address to the World" in which it called on African-Americans not to vote for Republican Party candidates in the 1908 presidential election, citing President Theodore Roosevelt's support for Jim Crow laws.

== End of the Movement ==
William Monroe Trotter's departure after the 1907 meeting had a serious negative impact on the organization, as did disagreements about which party to support in the 1908 election. Du Bois, with some reluctance, endorsed Democratic Party candidate William Jennings Bryan, but many African-Americans could not bring themselves to break from the Republicans, and William Howard Taft won the election, receiving significant African-American support. The 1908 annual meeting, held in Oberlin, Ohio, was a much smaller affair, and exposed disunity and apathy within the group at both local and national levels. Du Bois invited Mary White Ovington, a settlement worker and socialist he had met in 1904, to address the organization. She was the only white woman to be so honored. By 1908, Washington and his supporters successfully made serious inroads with the press (both white and black), and the Oberlin meeting received almost no coverage. Believing the Movement to be "practically dead", Washington also prepared an obituary of the organization for the New York Age to publish.

In 1909, chapter activities continued to dwindle, membership dropped, and the 1910 annual meeting (held at Sea Isle City, New Jersey) was a small affair that again received no significant press. It was the organization's last meeting.

== Legacy ==
In the wake of the Springfield Race Riot of 1908, a major race riot in Springfield, Illinois, a number of prominent white civil rights activists called for a major conference on race relations. Held in New York City in early 1909, the conference laid the foundation for the National Association for the Advancement of Colored People (NAACP), which was formally established in 1910. In 1911, Du Bois (who was appointed the NAACP's director of publications) recommended that the remaining membership of the Niagara Movement support the NAACP's activities. William Monroe Trotter attended the 1909 conference, but did not join the NAACP; he instead led other small activist civil rights organizations and continued to publish the Guardian until his death in 1934.

The Niagara Movement did not appear to be very popular with the majority of the African-American population, especially in the South. Booker T. Washington, at the height of the Movement's activities in 1905 and 1906, spoke to large and approving crowds across much of the country. The 1906 Atlanta Race Riot hurt Washington's popularity, giving the Niagarans fuel for their attacks on him. However, given that Washington and the Niagarans agreed on strategy (opposition to Jim Crow laws and support of equal protection and civil rights) but disagreed on tactics, a reconciliation between the factions began after Washington died in 1915. The NAACP went on to become the leading civil rights organization for African Americans in the 20th century.

== See also ==
- Nadir of American race relations
- National Independent Political League
