= Brook School (Hillburn, New York) =

- Hillburn, New York

Information
- Type: Public, segregated
- School district: Ramapo Central School District
- Last updated: 29 December 2017

Brook School was a grammar school located in Hillburn, New York, in the Ramapo Central School District, which served the district's black students until its racial integration in the 1940s.

== Description ==
The school was an all-black school, which parents fought to desegregate in the early 1930s and again in 1943. Thurgood Marshall was hired by the NAACP to desegregate the school. Thurgood Marshall won a disparity case regarding integration of the schools of Hillburn, 11 years before his landmark case of Brown v. Board of Education, on behalf of the village's African-American parents. Leonard M. Alexander and Peter C. Alexander, "It Takes a Village: The Integration of the Hillburn School System. Page Publishing, 2014 (ISBN 978-1-63417-331-5).

Black children who lived in Ramapo attended the Brook School in Hillburn, a wood structure that didn't include a gymnasium, library, or indoor bathrooms. Meanwhile, the Main School – attended by white children and now the headquarters of the Ramapo Central School District – included a gymnasium, a library, and indoor plumbing.
