= Harry Clay Smith =

American politician

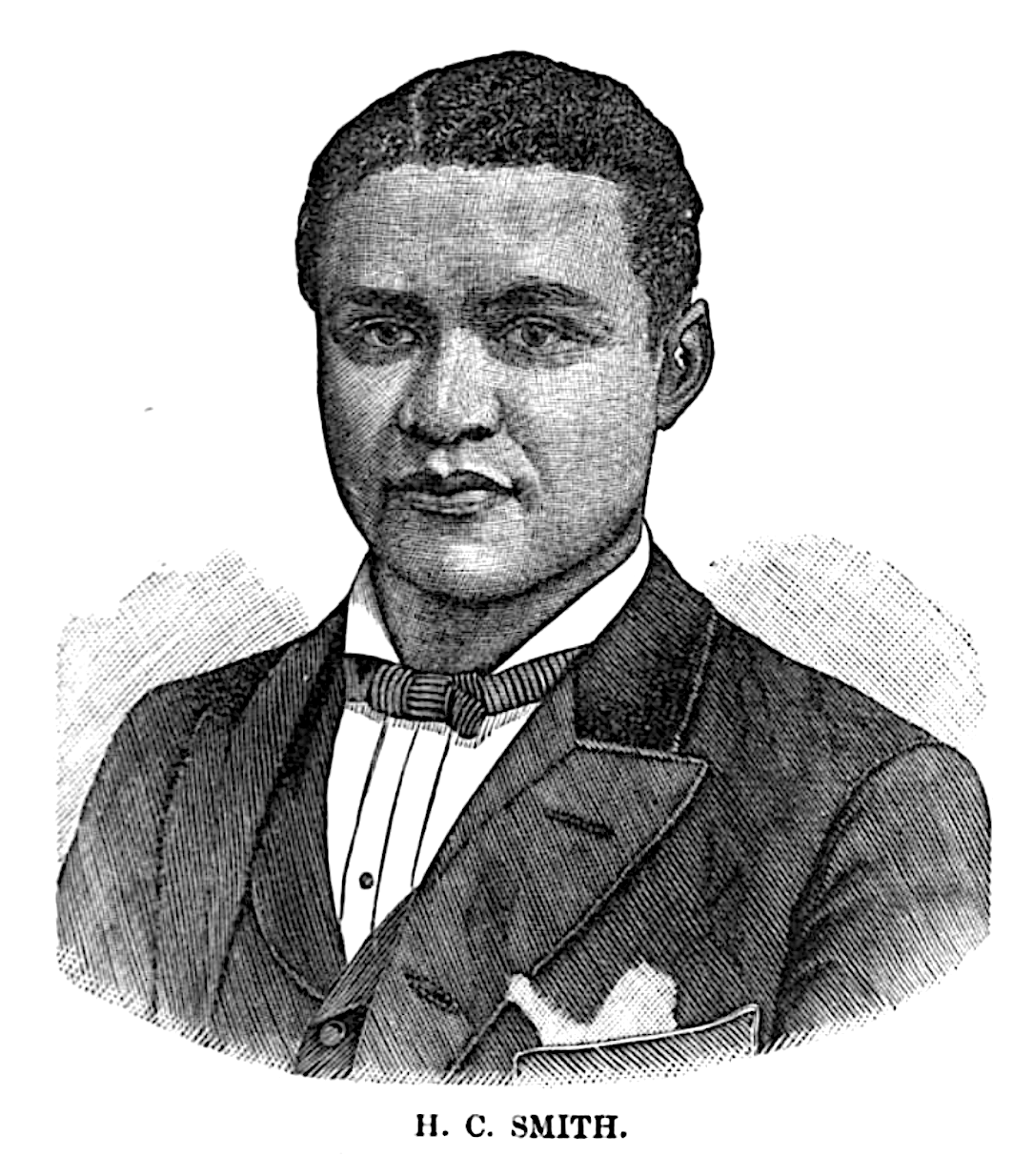
- Born: January 28, 1863; Clarksburg, West Virginia, U.S.
- Died: December 10, 1941 (aged 78); Cleveland, Ohio, U.S.
- Occupations: Musician; journalist; politician

Harry Clay Smith (January 28, 1863 – December 10, 1941) was an American newspaper editor and state legislator in Ohio. An African American, Smith was one of the strongest advocates for civil rights in the pre World War II era and was responsible for some of the strictest anti-lynching legislation in the country at the time. He served in the Ohio House of Representatives.

== Early life and education ==
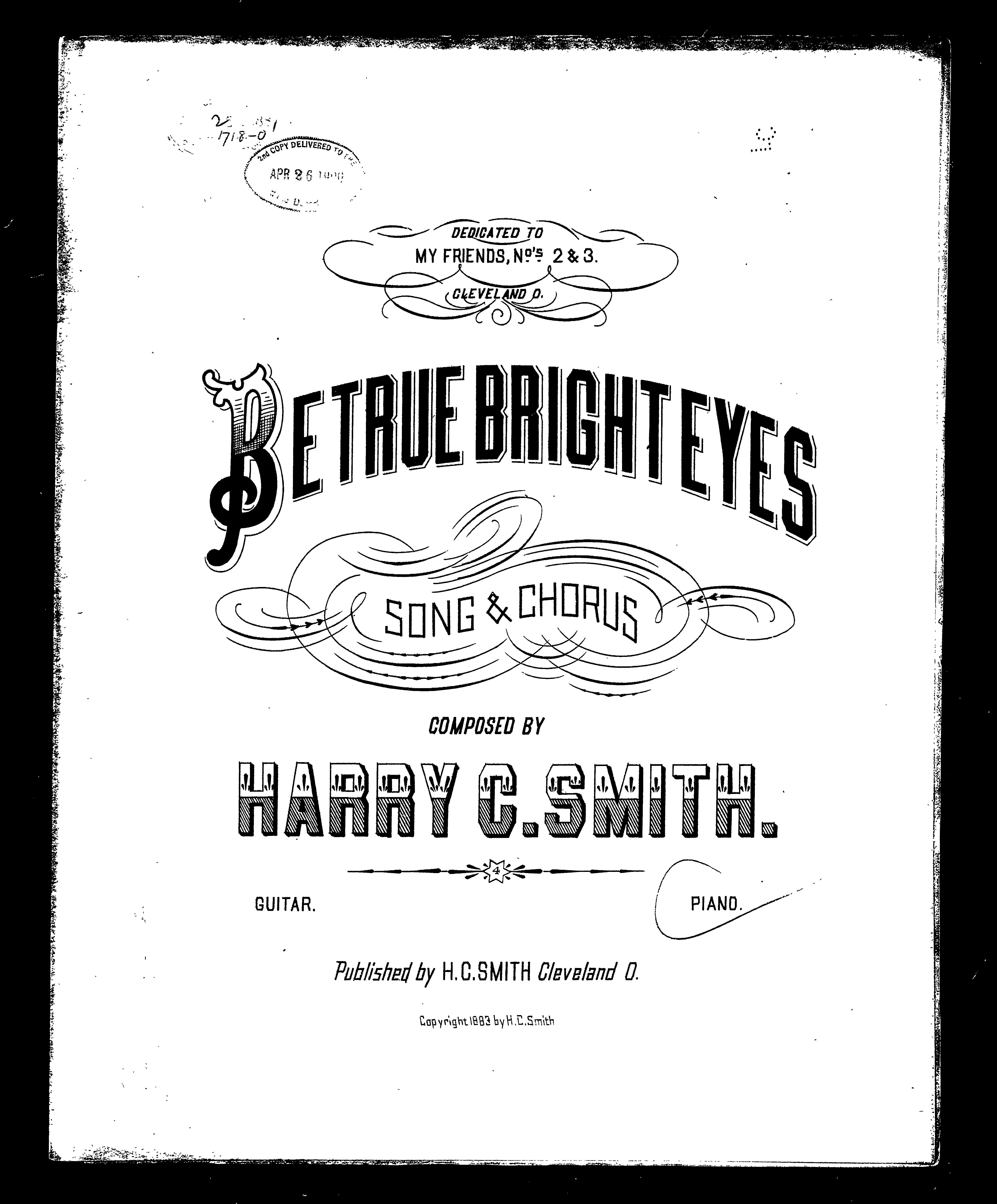
First page of sheet music for HC Smith's "Be True Bright Eyes"

Smith was born in Clarksburg, West Virginia, on January 28, 1863. His parents John and Sarah Smith moved to Cleveland, Ohio, in 1865 after the dramatic conclusion to the Civil War. In Cleveland, Smith attended one of America's first public schools, Central High School, founded in 1846. The school has graduated many prominent leaders of industry and culture, such as John D. Rockefeller and Langston Hughes. The schools were integrated at that time, and this informed his belief in equality of races and opposition to segregation. As a student, he learned to play the cornet and was constantly employed in orchestras and brass bands, allowing him to help support his family. In the summers of 1881 and 1882, he played the cornet for an orchestra in Lakewood, New York, on Chautauqua Lake. In 1882, while still in high school, he worked as a correspondent for papers in Indianapolis, Cincinnati, and Springfield, and during his last year and a half in school he wrote for a weekly paper, the Cleveland Sun. After finishing school he continued to work as a musician for about a year and a half. He directed many Cleveland-based colored orchestras, brass bands, and vocal groups including the Amphion male Quartet and the Freeman and Boston's orchestra, the First Methodist Episcopal Orchestra, the Central High School Orchestra, and the Excelsior Reed Band of Cleveland. He wrote many popular songs as well. He was also involved in several athletic organizations, and was often the only black person involved in the organizations.

== The Cleveland Gazette ==
After graduating from Central High school in 1882 he and three other colleagues founded The Cleveland Gazette in 1883. The Cleveland Gazette was one of several African-American-based newspapers that began publishing in the reconstruction era. Smith was initially the managing editor of the Gazette but quickly bought out the three others and became the sole proprietor of the paper. Smith ran the Cleveland Gazette as efficiently as any editor in history. The Gazette earned the name "old reliable" because the paper did not miss a Saturday publication in 58 years. Smith used his paper to speak out against controversial racial issues like segregated education and Ohio's "Black Laws" that discriminated against African Americans. He was equally against the idea of "self-segregation" by African Americans because he believed "it would be an opening wedge to segregation and Jim Crow schools". Smith also criticized vocational colleges like the Hampton and Tuskegee Schools and urged readers to attend traditional liberal arts colleges. The Gazette is remembered as "one of the better black newspapers of its day, it soon became the principal organ for the dissemination of Smith's political and ideological views and throughout the years it retained an uncompromising integrationist's stance unequaled by any other race or paper".

== Three-pronged approach ==
Harry Smith's plan to end the racial apartheid in America included three phases that attacked the legal, political and social aspects of racism and bigotry. Politically, Smith urged African Americans to participate and gain access to politics in order to end discriminatory public policies. Legally, he advocated the use of litigation to go after white only businesses protected by law. And finally, Smith attacked social injustice by supporting boycotts of businesses and government services that did not equally serve African-American people. This plan of attack was well documented in his work at the Gazette and in his political career.

Smith was one of the 29 co-founders who traveled to the inaugural meeting of the Niagara Movement from 14 states, becoming known as "The Original Twenty-nine".

== Political career ==
Smith's career in state politics began with support from his mentor Marcus A. Hanna, who also graduated from Central High School. Hanna, a Republican and one of Ohio's US State Senators in the 1890s convinced Smith to pursue a political career in order to promote change along with his paper. Taking Hanna's advice Smith took his first government job as an oil inspector from 1885 to 1889. In 1893 Smith was elected in a Cleveland district to serve on the State Assembly. Smith served three terms in the Ohio General Assembly as a Republican representative from 1893 to 1899. During his three terms as a rep Smith played key roles in the passing of the Ohio Civil Rights Act of 1894 which levied heavy penalties against businesses that exercised certain discriminatory practices. Smith was also part of the writing and passing of the Smith Act of 1896. This law was the most severe anti-lynching laws of its kind in that time period. During his political career Smith almost successfully fought off the showing of the racist film The Birth of a Nation in Cleveland but after years of litigation the movie was shown.

In 1920 Smith fought for a nomination of Ohio Secretary of State but was dropped from consideration due to his race. However, in 1926 Smith re-entered politics and was a candidate in the Republican Primary for Governor of Ohio. Although he lost the nomination, many remember his candidacy as a ground-breaking triumph for African Americans in Ohio politics. After this attempt Smith then focused on The Cleveland Gazette, of which he continued to be the head editor for another 15 years until his death.

== Death ==
Smith died on December 10, 1941. Smith left behind no wife or children; he bequeathed all his wealth and possessions to the Negro Blind Organization in Cleveland.
