= Brook Chapel =

- U.S. National Register of Historic Places
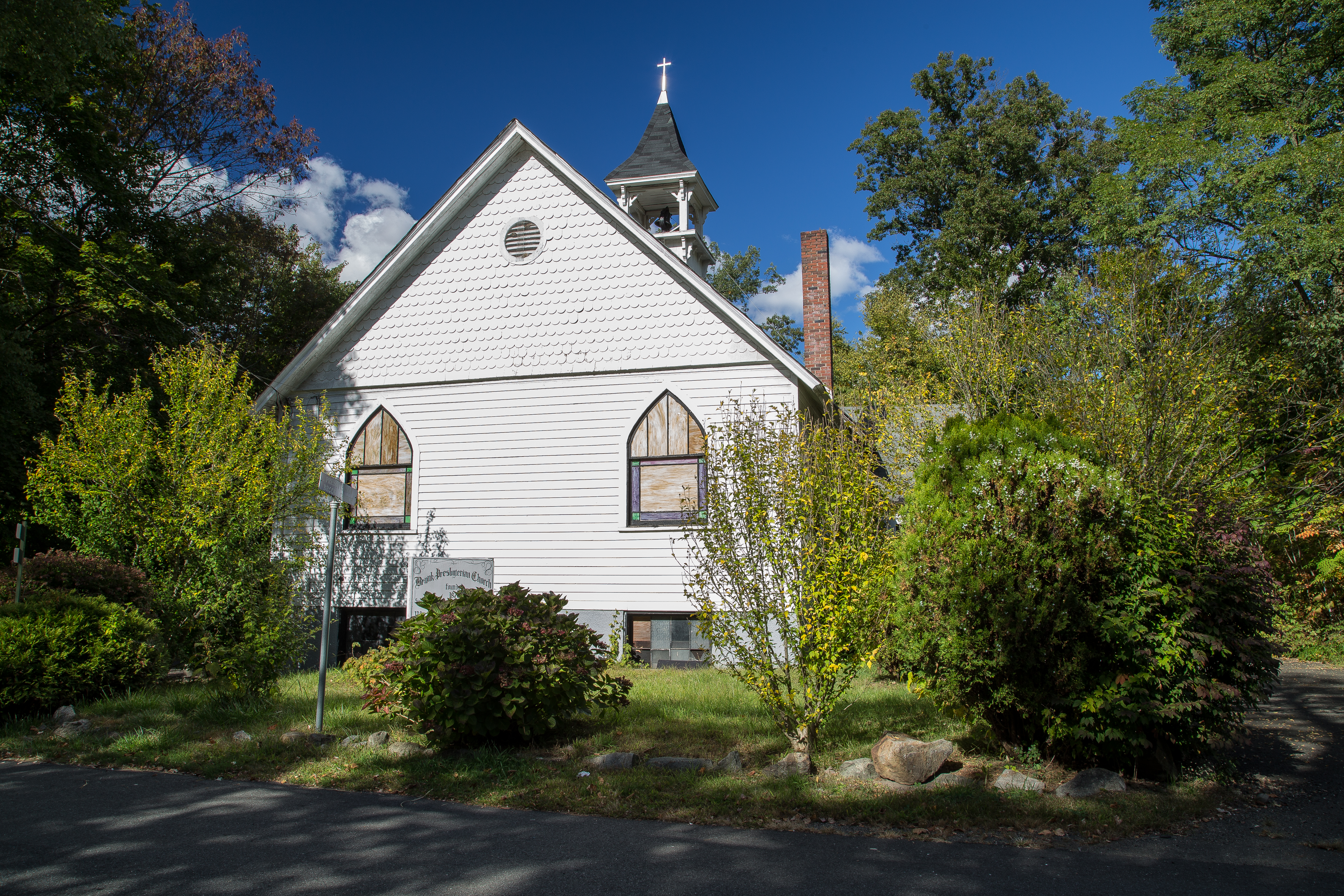

- Location within New York Location within the United States
- Location: 6th St., Hillburn, New York
- Coordinates: 41°7′29.07″N 74°10′34.55″W
- Area: 1.09 acres (0.44 ha)
- Built: 1893
- Architectural style: Gothic Revival
- NRHP reference No.: 09001287
- Added to NRHP: February 14, 2010

Brook Chapel is a historic chapel located at Hillburn in Rockland County, New York, USA. It was built in 1893 and is a light frame L-shaped, gable-roofed structure expanded to its current size in the first half of the 20th century. At the time of the expansion, it acquired its Gothic Revival style. It was listed on the National Register of Historic Places in 2010.

From 1907 until 1920, Rev. Byron Gunner served as the church pastor; and his wife Cicely Savery Gunner was involved with the Brook Chapel Sunday School and the Brook School.

== See also ==
- Main School (Hillburn, New York)
- National Register of Historic Places listings in Rockland County, New York
