= Main School (Hillburn, New York) =

- U.S. National Register of Historic Places
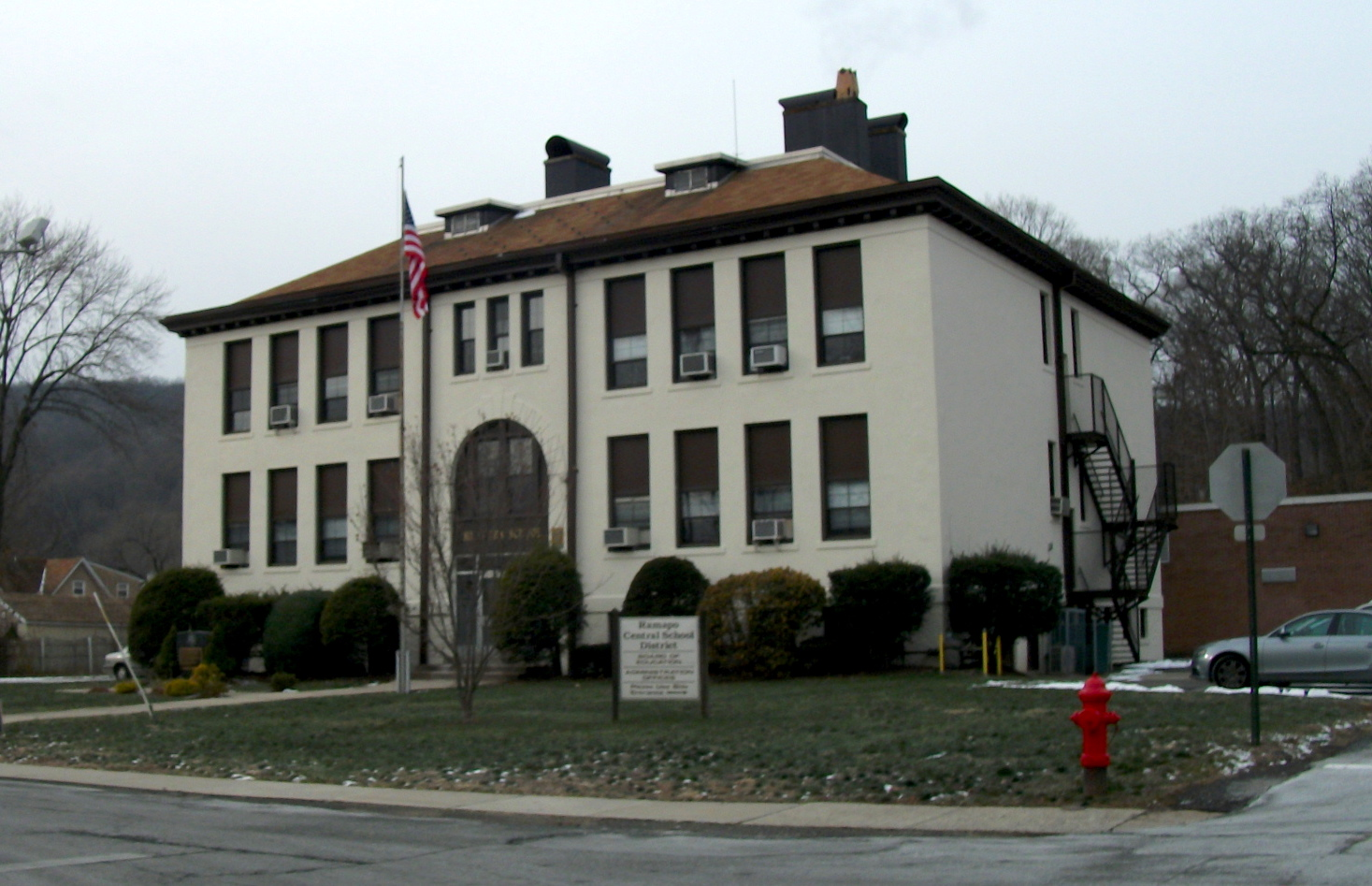
- Main School, December 2010

- Location within New York Location within the United States
- Location: 45 Mountain Ave., Hillburn, New York
- Coordinates: 41°07′30″N 74°10′11″W
- Area: 1.92 acres (0.78 ha)
- Built: 1912
- Architect: Charles Hoar
- Architectural style: Colonial Revival
- NRHP reference No.: 15000516
- Added to NRHP: August 5, 2015

Main School, also known as the Suffern Central School District Administration Building, is a historic school building located at Hillburn, Rockland County, New York. It was built in 1912, and is a two-story hollow tile and concrete building covered in stucco and set on a raised basement. The building features Colonial Revival style design elements and originally housed eight classrooms. In 1943, it was the focus of a prominent school desegregation battle, following the overturning of New York State's segregation law in 1938.

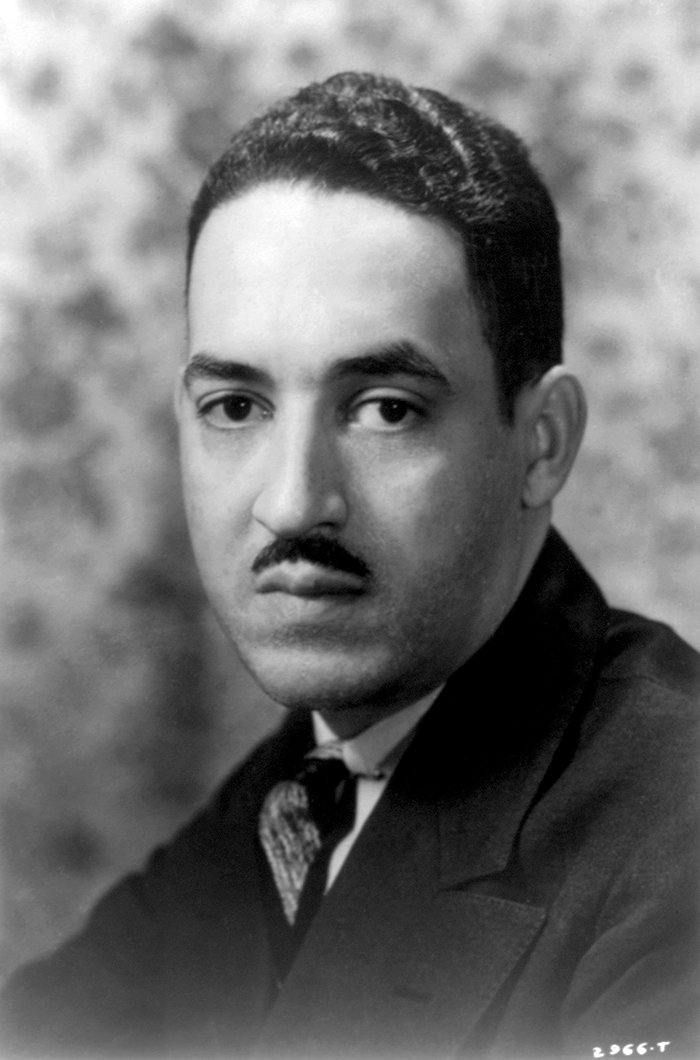
Thurgood-Marshall

In 1943, the attorney Thurgood Marshall won a disparity case regarding integration of the schools of Hillburn, 11 years before his landmark case of Brown v. Board of Education. He represented the village's African-American parents. In 2010, the state legislature designated May 17 as Thurgood Marshall Day in honor of his work in civil rights. Mixed-race children who lived in the town of Ramapo attended the Brook School in Hillburn, a wood structure that did not have a library, indoor bathrooms or gymnasium. The Main School was reserved for white children and included a gymnasium, a library and indoor plumbing.

It is now used as the headquarters of the Suffern Central School District. The Rockland African Diaspora Heritage Center in Pomona, New York, has an exhibit of artifacts and photographs loaned by a student who attended the Brook School. The student went on to college, and eventually taught English and history.

It was listed on the National Register of Historic Places in 2015.

== See also ==
- Brook Chapel
- National Register of Historic Places listings in Rockland County, New York
