= The Wyandotte Echo =

- Type: Weekly newspaper
- Format: Broadsheet
- Owner(s): M.R.P.P. Inc
- Publisher: Roberta M. Peterson
- Founded: 1933
- Headquarters: The Wyandotte Echo; P.O. Box 2305, Kansas City, KS 66110; United States
- Website: www.wyandotteecho.com

The Wyandotte Echo is a legal newspaper for Kansas City, Kansas. The Wyandotte Echo is published every Wednesday. The newspaper is owned by and operated by M.R.P.P. Inc. The Wyandotte Echo is the official newspaper for the Wyandotte County Unified Government and the 29th District of Kansas Courts.

African American attorney and Niagara Movement co-founder Isaac F. "I.F." Bradley, Sr. (1862 – 1938) published and edited the paper, from 1930, until his death, in 1938.
