= Charles Edwin Bentley =

American dentist (1859–1929)

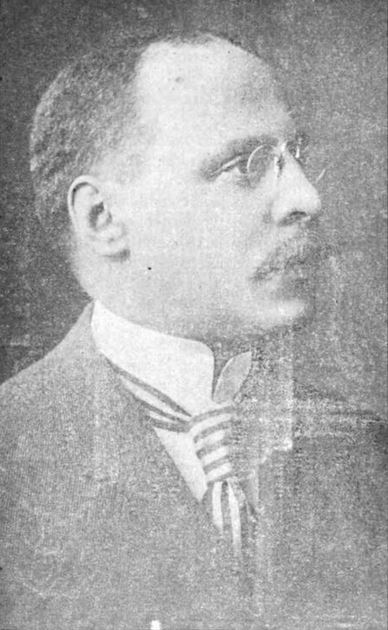
- Charles E. Bentley, c. 1913
- Born: February 1, 1859; Cincinnati, Ohio
- Died: October 13, 1929 (aged 70); Chicago, Illinois
- Occupation: Dentist

Charles Edwin Bentley (1859–1929) was an American dentist. In Chicago, he was the founder of what grew to be the largest local dental society in the world in the early 20th century. As an African American civil rights activist, he was a founder of the Niagara Movement and leader in the Chicago branch of the National Association for the Advancement of Colored People (NAACP).

== Biography ==
Bentley was born and educated in Cincinnati, Ohio. In 1887 he earned his Doctor of Dental Surgery degree from the Chicago College of Dental Surgery. In his office was organized, in 1888, the Odontographic Society, and he was its first president. This dental organization grew to be the largest local dental society in the world. In February 1903 the Odontographic Society gave its famous clinic with three thousand members of the profession and nearly one thousand dental students in attendance. The Odontographical Society was merged into the Chicago Dental Society in 1911, and Bentley was a part of the merger committee. At the suggestion of Dr. Bentley, the Odontographic Society instituted an investigation into the condition of the mouths and teeth of the children of the schools. One year later Dr. Bentley submitted this report, and the same was published in the Dental Review of 1900. This report was the basis of future work along this line.

Bentley published extensively. Two of his most important papers were "The Application of Comparative Anatomy to Dentistry” and “Contact Points of the Medical and Dental Profession".

Bentley experimented with the use of hypnotism as an anesthetic in dental surgery and studied its application at The Chicago School of Psychology.

Bentley was chairman of the Child Welfare Exhibit on Dentistry. He long served as the secretary of Provident Hospital. He was the first president of the Equal Opportunity League of Chicago. He was a charter member of the Niagara Movement, and of the directory of the NAACP.

In 1898, Bentley married Florence Lewis, who was for some years the literary editor of the Philadelphia Press.

In 1921 Charles Edwin Bentley was honored by the city of Chicago for his accomplishments and also by Howard University

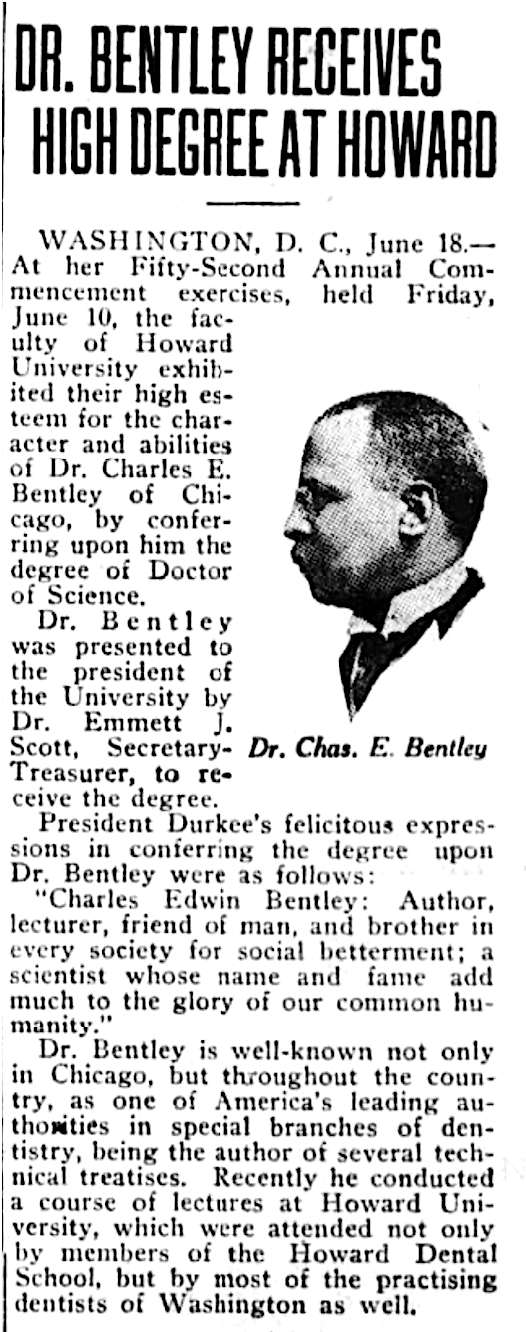
Charles Edwin Bentley is honored by Howard University

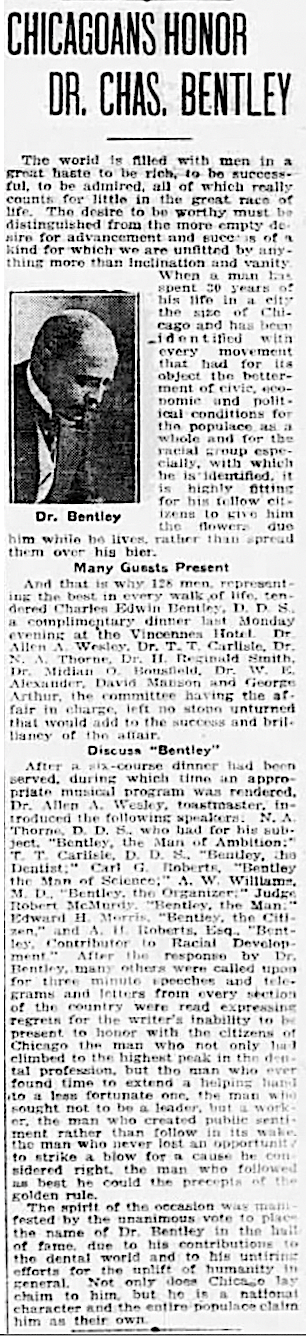
Charles Edwin Bentley is honored by Chicagoans
