= Mary Frances Gunner =

American dramatist (1894–1953)

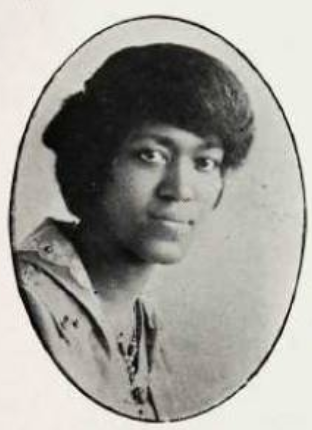
- Mary Frances Gunner, from the 1915 yearbook of Howard University
- Born: Mary Frances Gunner; November 9, 1894; Lexington, Kentucky, U.S.
- Died: May 13, 1953 (aged 58)
- Education: Howard University
- Occupation: Playwright
- Spouse: Jerry van Dunk
- Relatives: Byron Gunner (father)
- Writing career
- Notable work: Light of the Women (1924)

Mary Frances Gunner (November 9, 1894 – May 13, 1953) was an American playwright and African American community leader based in Brooklyn, New York. She was also known as Francis Gunner Van Dunk.

== Early life and education ==
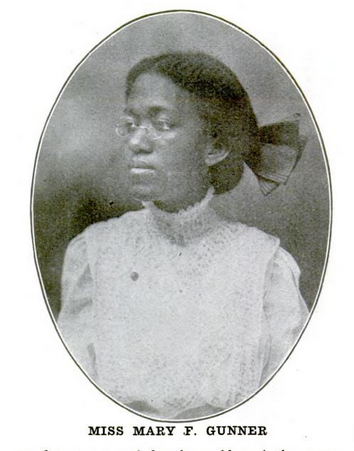
Mary Frances Gunner, from a 1911 publication

Mary Frances Gunner was born in Lexington, Kentucky, and raised in Hillburn, New York, the daughter of Rev. Byron Gunner and Cicely Savery Gunner. Her parents, both born in Alabama, were active in public life; her father was one of the 29 founders of the Niagara Movement and president of the National Equal Rights League, and her mother, a teacher, was president of the Empire State Federation of Women's Clubs. Her grandfather William Savery, born a slave, was a founder of Talladega College.

She finished at Suffern High School as the only black girl in her class, and as valedictorian. She attended Middlebury College. She also attended Howard University, and was an officer in that school's chapter of the National Association for the Advancement of Colored People. In 1913, she was initiated into Delta Sigma Theta sorority. She served as President of Alpha Chapter from 1914 to 1915. In her capacity as President, she requested that Mary Church Terrell write the Sorority's Oath. In 1930, she completed a master's degree in the Political Science department at Columbia University, with a thesis titled "Employment Problems Among Negro Women in Brooklyn."

== Career ==
Mary Frances Gunner worked at the YWCA in Montclair, New Jersey, and after 1921 at the Ashland Place YWCA in Brooklyn. She also taught school in New York. Gunner was a branch manager for the New York State Employment Service from 1938 to 1950. She was active in the National Association of College Women.

Her pageant play, Light of the Women (1924), presents the stories of such African-American heroines as Sojourner Truth, Harriet Tubman, Fanny Jackson Coppin, and Phillis Wheatley. It was intended for performance by community groups and schools, to teach and celebrate the achievements of African-American women. It was performed in 1927 at the YWCA in Orange, New Jersey.

== Personal life ==
Mary Frances Gunner married Jerry van Dunk, also from Hillburn, in 1946. She died in Brooklyn in 1953.
