= Byron Gunner =

American minister and activist (1857–1922)

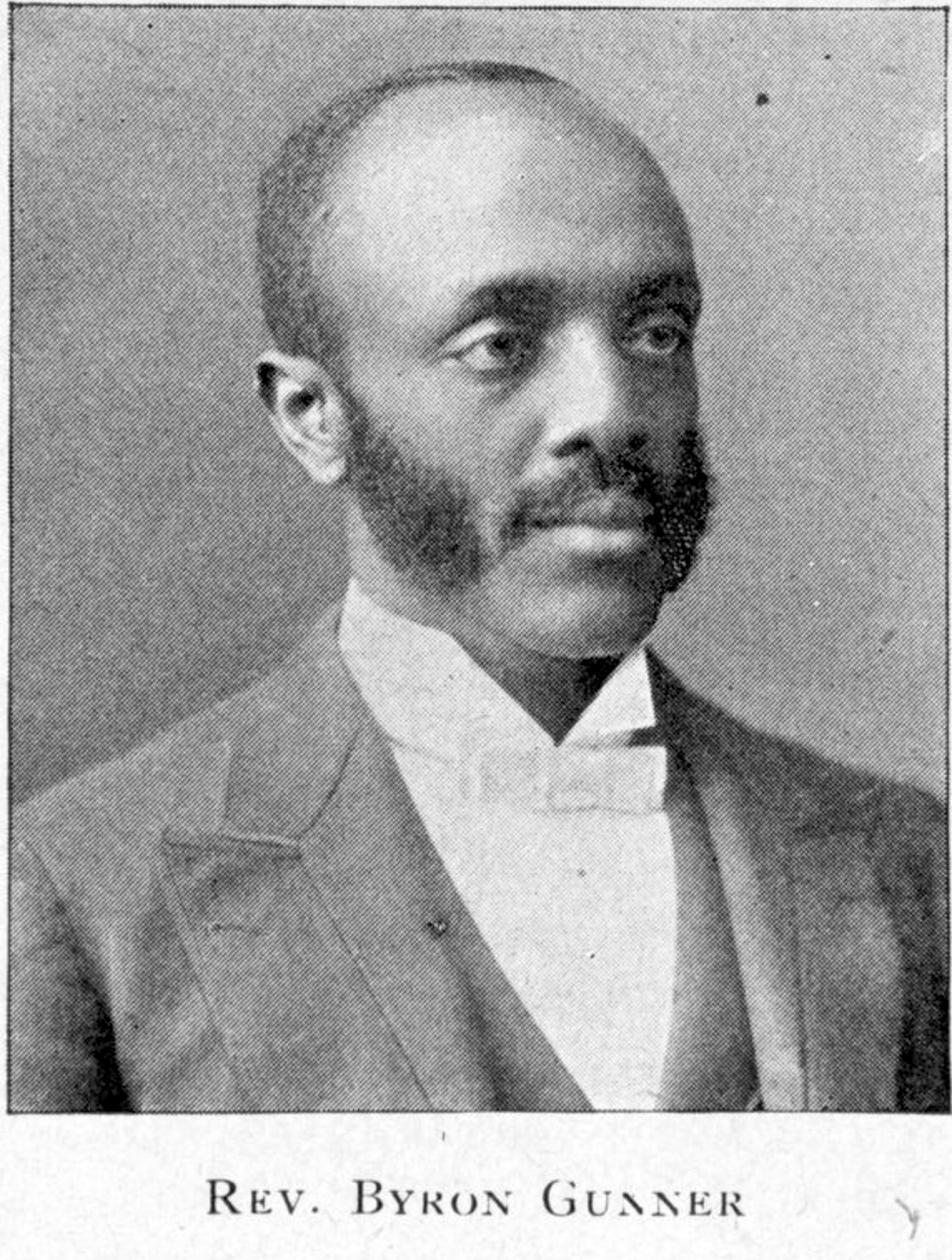
- Born: July 4, 1857; Marion, Alabama, U.S.
- Died: February 9, 1922 (aged 64); Reading, Pennsylvania, U.S.
- Education: Talladega College
- Occupations: Minister, educator, newspaper publisher, civil rights activist
- Spouse: Cicely Savery
- Children: 4, including Mary Frances Gunner

Rev. Byron Gunner (1857–1922) was an American minister, educator, newspaper publisher, and civil rights activist. He was one of the seventeen African-American founders of the Niagara Movement, representing Rhode Island.

== Early life and education ==
Byron Gunner was born on July 4, 1857, in Marion, Alabama, to parents Caroline (née Jackson) and Joseph Gunner, a carpenter. Gunner was educated in American Missionary Association schools in Marion.

He graduated in 1880 in theology from Talladega College, a private historically black college. He also studied at Oberlin College.

== Career ==
He worked as a teacher in Paris, Texas, from 1880 until 1884 through the American Missionary Association after graduation, a Protestant-based abolitionist group from Albany, New York. During this time he also published the People's Informer newspaper.

In 1884, Gunner was ordained a minister in New Orleans, followed by five years as a pastor at St. Paul Congregational Church (now known as Church of Jesus Christ New Iberia) in New Iberia, Louisiana. In c. 1888, the St. Paul Congregational Church under the leadership of Gunner supported the founding of the Howe Institute, an African-American private Baptist primary and grammar school in New Iberia. He was outspoken about the effects of "race problems" while living in New Iberia; and according to Booker T. Washington, Gunner had heard that a white mob was coming for him so he abruptly left the city.

In 1890, Gunner moved to serve as pastor at the newly opened First Congregational Church in Lexington, Kentucky. Gunner spoke to the American Missionary Association on "men of color in the Southern pulpit" in 1891, which was published in The American Missionary journal (v. 45, no. 12). In 1893, he married Cicely Savery, the daughter of William Savery, one of the three founders of Talladega College. Together they had four children, including Mary Frances Gunner. While living in Lexington, Gunner became active against the Kentucky's Separate Coach Law of 1892, a Jim Crow law requiring separate coaches on railway trains for white and black passengers in the state. Gunner proposed legislation and lectured across the state against the law.

In 1895, Gunner moved to the New England-area. From 1898 to 1905, he served as the pastor at Union Congregational Church in Newport, Rhode Island. Gunner was one of the seventeen founders of the Niagara Movement, representing Rhode Island. During this time in Rhode Island, Gunner became acquainted with W. E. B. Du Bois and with William Monroe Trotter; he remained in contact with both men until his death.

In 1907, he became the pastor of the Brook Chapel in Hillburn, New York; and his wife Cicely was involved with the Brook Chapel Sunday School and the Brook School. He became president of the National Equal Rights League by 1910, where he continued to serve within the organization's leadership through about 1920. In August 1916, he called Black Americans to join for the formation of a National Race Congress in a publication in the Cleveland Advocate newspaper.

== Death ==
Around 1920, Gunner served as a short-term pastor of the Presbyterian church in Reading, Pennsylvania. He died on February 9, 1922, in Reading, Pennsylvania, after suffering from an intestinal issue. At the time of his death, his wife was at her mother's funeral.
