= John Gunner =

English cricketer (1884–1918)

Personal information
- Full name: John Hugh Gunner
- Born: 17 May 1884; Bishops Waltham, Hampshire, England
- Died: 9 August 1918 (aged 34); Kemmel, Flanders, Belgium
- Batting: Right-handed
- Bowling: Right-arm medium
- Relatives: Charles Gunner (father)

Domestic team information
- Years: Team
- 1906–1907: Hampshire

Career statistics
Competition	First-class
Matches	6
Runs scored	65
Batting average	8.12
100s/50s	–/–
Top score	32
Catches/stumpings	4/–
- Source: Cricinfo, 7 January 2010

John Hugh Gunner (17 May 1884 – 9 August 1918) was an English first-class cricketer and British Army officer.

The son of the cricketer Charles Gunner, he was born at Bishops Waltham in May 1884. He was educated at Marlborough College, where he played for a captained the college cricket team. From there he matriculated to Trinity College, Oxford. He represented Trinity College at cricket, but did not progress to play for Oxford University Cricket Club, but did gain a half blue in field hockey. After graduating from Oxford, Gunner became a solicitor and joined the family firm, Gunner & Sons Solicitors, the fifth generation of the family to do so. Gunner was commissioned into the Hampshire Yeomanry as a second lieutenant in May 1905.

Gunner played first-class cricket for Hampshire, making his debut against the touring West Indians at Southampton in 1906. He made five further first-class appearances for Hampshire, with three matches in 1906 and two in 1907. He scored 65 runs in his six matches, at an average of 8.12 and with a highest score of 32, made on debut against the West Indians. Besides playing at first-class level for Hampshire, he played a club level for the Hampshire Hogs and the Marylebone Cricket Club, in addition to representing Hampshire in field hockey.

Gunner resigned his commission from the Hampshire Yeomanry in March 1914, but with the beginning of the First World War in July of the same year, he joined the Hampshire Regiment and was promoted to lieutenant in the conflicts opening months. He was made a temporary captain while serving as an adjutant in May 1915, with Gunner vacating the appointment in May 1916. He was promoted to captain on a permanent basis in June 1917, antedated to June 1916. Gunner died from wounds on 9 August 1918, sustained during fighting near Kemmel in Belgium. He was buried at the La Clytte near Ypres. He was survived by his wife, Dorothy, whom he had married at the Winchester College Chapel in July 1909. He is memorialised at St Peter's Church in Bishops Waltham, with an inscribed plaque reading "Giving thanks to God for the memory of John Hugh Gunner, Capt. Hampshire Carabiniers Yeomanry killed in action near Ypres. 9th August 1918 aged 34. Gloria Eorum Non Delebitur".
