= Gunner Higham =

English footballer (1887 – after 1920)

Personal information
- Full name: Thomas Edwin Higham
- Date of birth: 22 December 1887
- Place of birth: Daventry, England
- Height: 5 ft 9 in (1.75 m)
- Position: Left half

Senior career*
Years	Team	Apps	(Gls)
1907–1920	Brighton & Hove Albion	124	(0)
- * Club domestic league appearances and goals

Thomas Edwin Higham (22 December 1887 – after 1920), commonly known as Gunner Higham, was an English professional footballer who made 124 Southern League appearances playing as a left half for Brighton & Hove Albion.

== Life and career ==
Higham was born in Daventry, Northamptonshire. He was a serving soldier with the Royal Field Artillery – hence the nickname "Gunner" – stationed at Preston Barracks, Brighton, when he signed amateur forms with Southern League club Brighton & Hove Albion in 1907. When he finished his term, he signed as a professional in January 1909, and was a first-team regular for the next two-and-a-half seasons. Higham remained an Army reservist, so was called up at the outbreak of the First World War and missed the entire 1914–15 season. He was posted to France, and wrote letters home from the front that were published in the local press. He returned to the Albion team for 1919–20, their last Southern League season before their admission to the newly formed Football League Third Division, at the end of which he was awarded a benefit match; the proceeds of £605 was then a record for a Southern League benefit.
