= Liz Gunner =

Academic

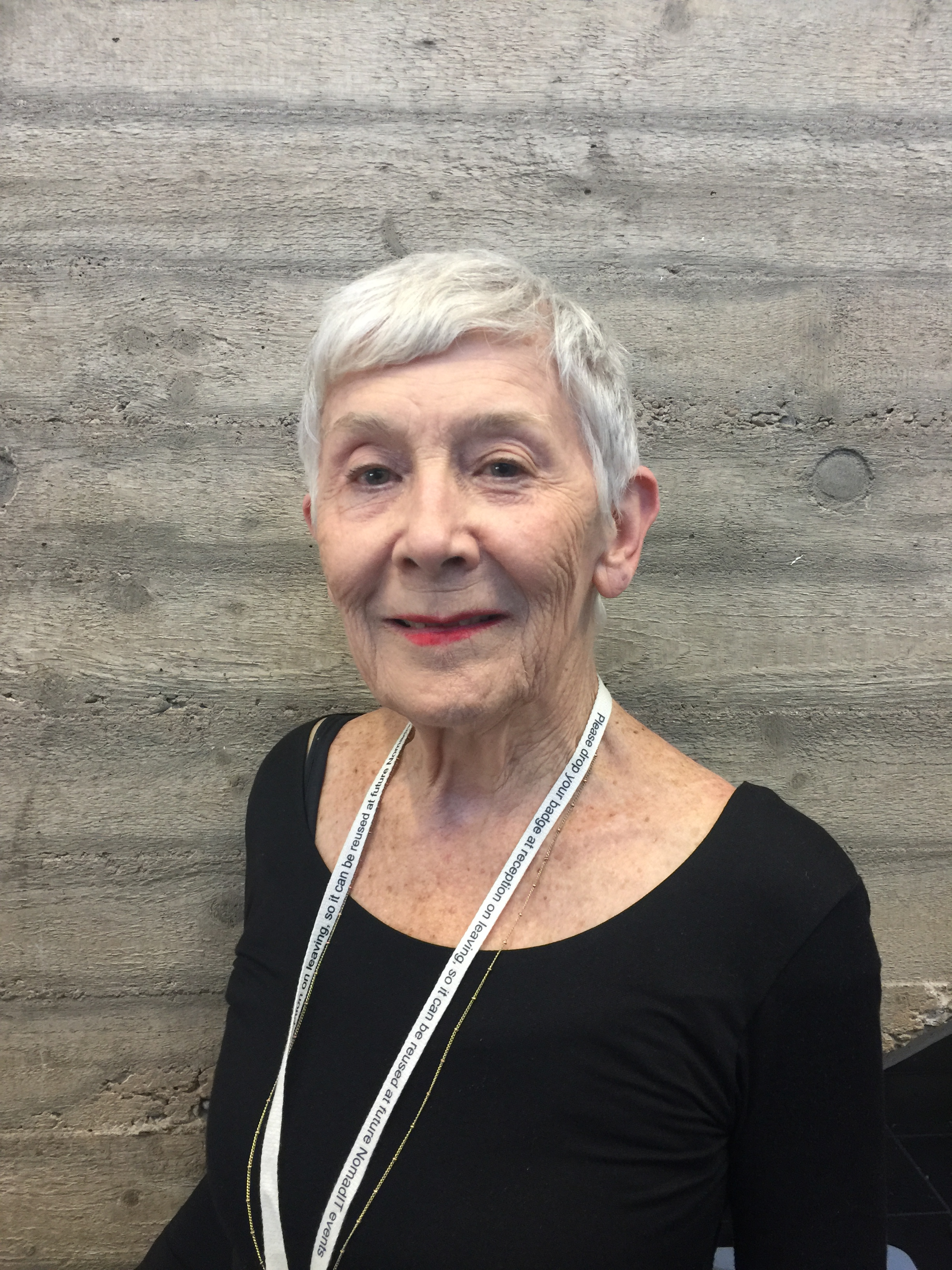
- Liz Gunner (2023)
- Born: 1941 (age 83–84); Sri Lanka

Academic background
- Education: University of London

Liz Gunner (born 1941) is an academic who specializes in South African literature and culture, and particularly radio. She is a visiting research professor at the University of Johannesburg and a professorial research associate at the School of Oriental and African Studies of the University of London (SOAS). She has published on African literature and run workshops all over England. Her Radio Soundings: South Africa and the Black Modern was published by Cambridge University Press in 2019.

== Background ==
Born in Sri Lanka, Gunner has a PhD from the University of London. She taught African literature for many years at SOAS University of London, before going to work in South Africa.

== Bibliography ==
=== Monographs ===
- Radio Soundings: South Africa and the Black Modern (Cambridge University Press, 2019; ISBN 9781108556903)
- A Handbook for Teaching African Literature (Heinemann, 1984)

=== Edited collections ===
- Radio in Africa: Publics, cultures, communities (with Dina Ligaga and Dumisano Moyo; Wits UP, 2011)
- Power, Marginality and African Oral Literature (with Graham Furniss, 2008)
