= The Cleveland Gazette =

Weekly African American newspaper (1883–1945)

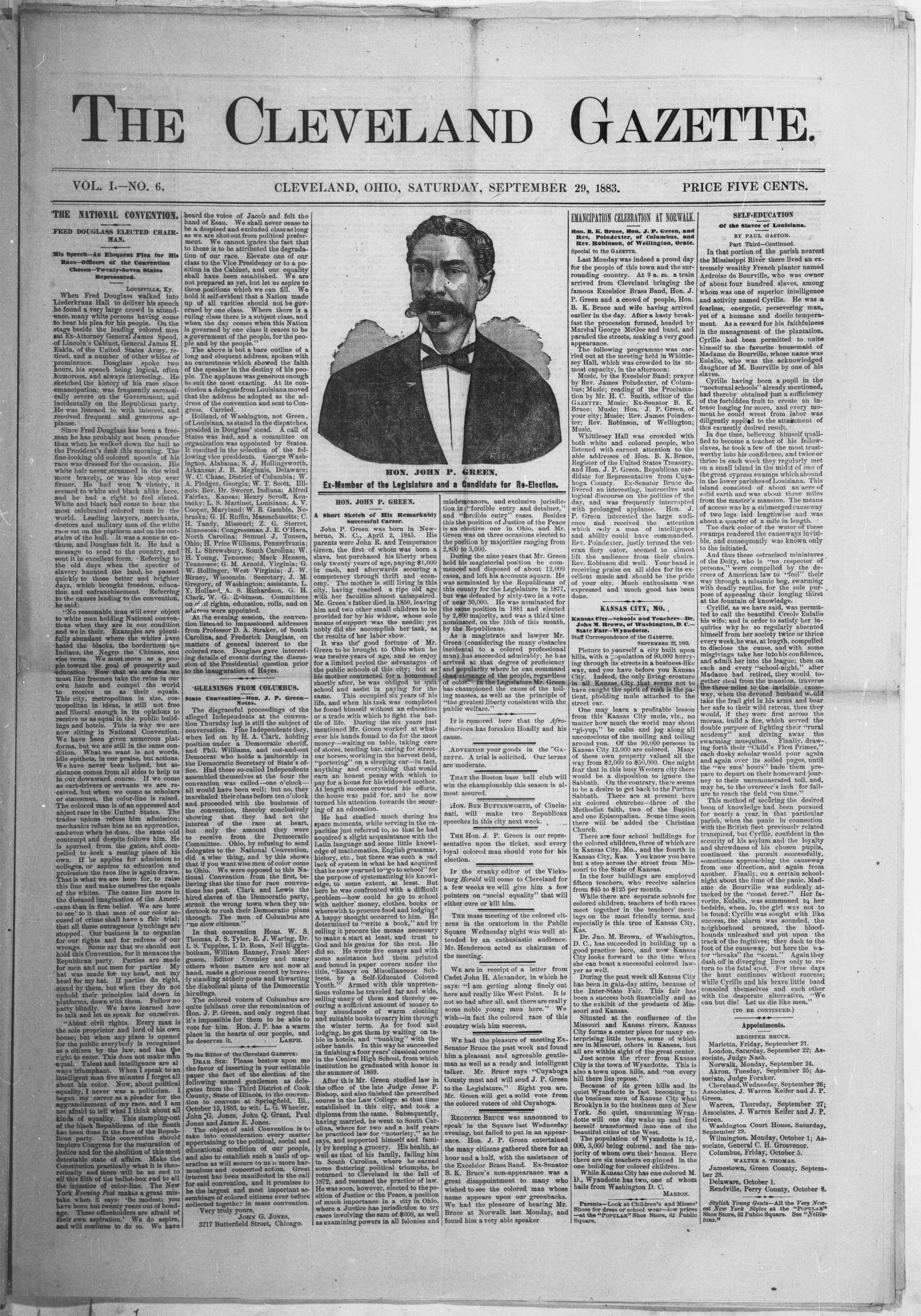
Front page, September 29, 1883

The Cleveland Gazette was a weekly newspaper published in Cleveland from August 25, 1883, to May 20, 1945. It was an African American newspaper owned and edited by Harry Clay Smith, initially with a group of partners. Circulation was estimated between 5,000 and 18,000.

The Gazette became the longest-publishing African American weekly in the United States, earning its nickname "The Old Reliable" by never missing a Saturday publication date in 58 years.

== Background and establishment ==
=== Cleveland ===
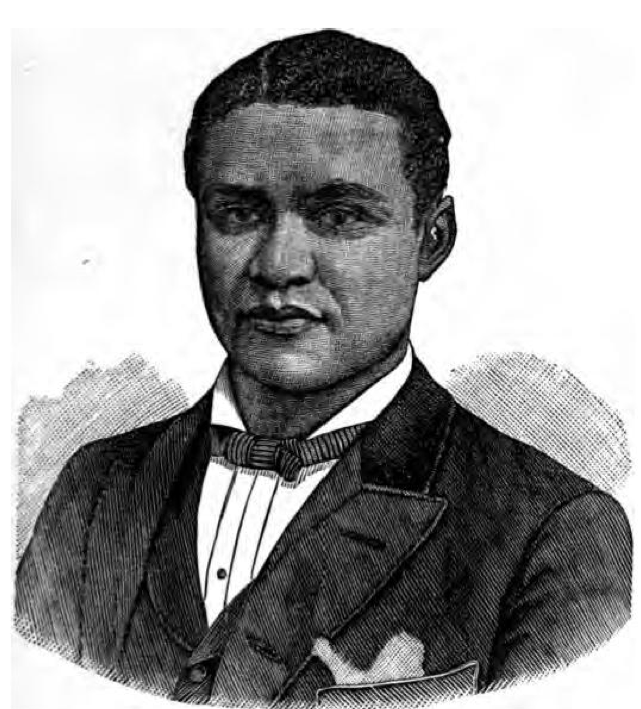
Harry C. Smith, founder, editor and proprietor of The Cleveland Gazette for much of its early existence

Many African Americans moved from the South to northern cities, such as Cleveland, after the end of Reconstruction. Cleveland was populated by many New Englanders who opposed the institution of slavery and the addition of African Americans allowed the city's public areas to become more integrated with minimal racial conflicts. During this time, the demand and support of African-American newspapers in the North grew. Various "religious and charitable organizations provided financial support for newspapers," and educational advancements allowed more African Americans read and write.

=== Harry Clay Smith ===
Known as "The Forgotten Warrior," Harry Clay Smith (1863–1941) received an education from the Cleveland Public School System, which was integrated at the time. Smith was a writer for "the weekly Cleveland Sun, a white paper" and was a "leader" as an athlete and musician during his high school years. After high school, Smith helped create The Cleveland Gazette and served as an Ohio legislator from 1883–1899. He was heavily involved in the passage of the Ohio Civil Rights Law of 1894 and an "anti-lynching law" in 1896.

=== The Cleveland Gazette ===
Striving to better represent African Americans and the issues they were facing at the time, Smith created The Cleveland Gazette, "Cleveland's first black newspaper," with three other men in 1883. Smith became the "sole owner" in 1888, and he financed the paper through "Republican party contributions" and earnings from rental property ownership and "job printing." The newspaper "advocated that blacks should aggressively demand their equal rights without compromise," which represented Smith's values.

== Beginning years ==
=== Content ===
When The Cleveland Gazette first started being published in the early 1880s, it "presented itself as a partisan Republican organ" since the Republican Party was a supporter of African Americans' campaign for civil rights at the time. Some of the newspaper's first articles "chastised the Republican-controlled legislature for failing to abolish the remaining Black Laws," such as the law prohibiting interracial marriage. In the beginning period of the Cleveland Gazette, the paper clearly asserted its mission to be a political force for Black Americans in the midst of the 1883 Supreme Court decision that reversed the 1875 Civil Rights Act. In 1896, the year of the Plessy vs. Ferguson "separate, but equal" decision, Smith sought a new strategy of using journalism for social change. By the mid-to-late 1890s, the explicit tone of Smith's political voice faded, although Harry Smith's integrationist stance never swayed. Instead, the newspaper paid more attention to general interests of local Black communities. By 1886, issues often featured front pages that contained "editorials" that criticized the Democratic Party, "trivia and facts" about remarkable African Americans, and articles about local and national news updates. At the time, social news, such as articles about "dinner parties" and "fashion tips," were reserved for later pages of the newspaper.

=== Audience ===
The Cleveland Gazette strove to reflect the values of "Cleveland [African-American] natives or longstanding residents," known as "old elites." Members of this population often intermingled with whites in public spaces and were known for being "well-educated and articulate." Cleveland's "old elites" represented merely a fraction of the 96,901 Ohio African Americans being targeted for subscription in the mid-1880s. At the end of July 1886, Smith announced that 3,500 copies of the newspaper were in "circulation," which was below the 5,000 goal.

== Content shifts ==
=== Mid-1890s ===
Political content in the newspaper decreased, and more social news began to appear on the front page in the early to mid-1890s. By 1896, the newspaper's name had been shortened to The Gazette. As Cleveland's African-American population continued to grow, The Gazette and other African-American newspapers began focusing on "shaping and especially reflecting the values of black communities." In a typical 1896 issue, the first two columns on the front page, which had contained information about remarkable black actions in 1883 issues, were "devoted to a weekly women's apparel column." Attempting to better represent African Americans, Smith was also replacing the term "Negro" with "Afro-American" by 1896.

=== World War I ===
After the turn of the century, The Gazette often changed its position about African-American migration to the North. Before and after World War I, the newspaper contained material that criticized the "behavior" of the migrants. During World War I, African Americans migrated to Northern cities to fill vacant factory jobs, and The Gazette lessened its criticism of the needed migrants. It was around this time that incidents of racial discrimination, such as African Americans "being denied service in hotels and eating establishments," became more prevalent. In response, The Gazette published more material about discriminatory acts in the early 1900s than it had in previous years.

== Demise ==
Smith's Republican support started to decline after the election of 1896; during the election, Smith, an advocate for Republican William McKinley, criticized "George A. Myers, another black ally of McKinley." After this incident, Smith's chances of getting "a job in the McKinley administration" were ruined by Columbus leader Ralph Tyler, who responded to Smith's criticism of Myers in the Colored American. At this time, Smith was also struggling to finance The Gazette. Along with the loss of Republican support and a lack of financial backings, The Gazette's popularity declined when the Call and Post was created around World War I. Smith died in 1941, and publication of The Gazette ended in 1945.

== See also ==
- The Aliened American, a newspaper in Cleveland from 1853–1855
- List of newspapers in the United States
- African-American history
