= Marilyn Gunner =

American physics professor

- Education: Binghamton University; University of Pennsylvania
- Awards: PECASE; Fellow of the American Physical Society
- Scientific career
- Fields: molecular biophysics; structural biology
- Workplaces: City College of New York
- Website: https://gunnerlab.ccny.cuny.edu/

Marilyn Gunner is a physics professor at the City College of New York (CUNY) and a Fellow of the American Physical Society. She is known for her work on molecular biophysics and structural biology.

== Education ==
Gunner received her B.A. from the State University of New York (Binghamton). She completed her Ph.D. in 1988 at the University of Pennsylvania, where she worked on topics such as electron transfer in proteins with Leslie Dutton.

== Career and research ==
Gunner previously worked in Barry Honig's lab at Columbia University, where she studied the electrostatic control of proteins. She is now a professor in the physics department at CUNY where she has continued to study protein interactions. As of 2021, her 140 publications have been cited over 5,800 times. She is the lead investigator of the Multi-Conformation Continuum Electrostatics (MCCE) project, which is "a biophysics simulation program combining continuum electrostatics and molecular mechanics." Gunner was also part of a collaboration which measured the efficiency of energy storage in cyanobacteria, work that could have implications for astrobiology.

In 2006, Gunner served as the chair of the Division of Biological Physics in the American Physical Society. She currently serves as a member of the editorial board for both the Journal of the Royal Society Interface and Biochimica et Biophysica Acta – Bioenergetics. Gunner has also served as both a general member and a member of the board of directors for the Telluride Science Research Center.

== Awards and recognition ==
- The Presidential Early Career Award for Scientists and Engineers (1996): "For biophysics of proteins"
- Fellow of the American Physical Society, Division of Biological Physics (2007): "For her work in both experimental and theoretical studies of electron and proton transfer processes in proteins, in particular for her beautiful work coupling the theory of electrostatic interactions to the dynamics of charge transfer in photosynthetic reaction centers, and in recognition of her service to the Division of Biological Physics."
