= Charles Gunner =

English cricketer

- Born: Charles Richards Gunner; 7 January 1853 Bishops Waltham, Hampshire, England
- Died: 4 February 1924 (aged 71) Bishops Waltham, Hampshire, England
- School: Marlborough College

Rugby union career
- Position: Three-quarters
International career
Years	Team	Apps	(Points)
1875	England	1	(0)

Charles Richards Gunner (7 January 1853 — 4 February 1924) was an English first-class cricketer and rugby union international.

The son of C. J. Gunner, he was born at Bishops Waltham in January 1853. He was educated at Marlborough College, becoming a solicitor after completing his education. Gunner played rugby union for England in 1875, making a single Test appearance against Ireland at Dublin in the 1875–76 Home Nations. A club cricketer for Bishops Waltham, he made a single appearance in first-class cricket for Hampshire against Derbyshire at Derby in 1878. He was called upon to bat or bowl in the match, but did take a single catch. Gunner served as a clerk to the Hampshire County Justices and was a registrar of the County Court. He spent 40 years as clerk at for the Droxford Petty Sessions, up until his death at his residence at Bishops Waltham in February 1924, following a long illness. He was laid to rest there at St Peter's Church, and was survived by his wife Jessie Kate Mason, with whom he had nine children - seven boys and two girls - with three of their sons dying in the First World War. One of their sons who died in the war, John, also played first-class cricket.
