= Gunner Lindberg =

American murderer (born 1975)

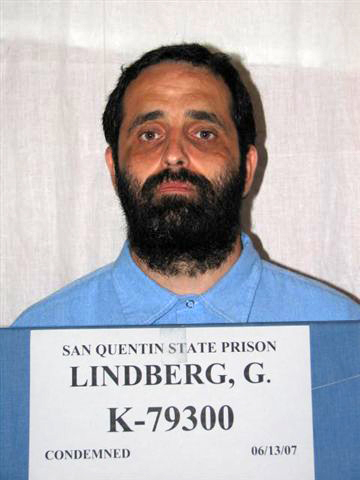
- Born: Gunner Jay Lindberg; March 1, 1975 (age 51); Orange County, California, U.S.
- Status: Imprisoned at San Quentin State Prison in California
- Convictions: First degree murder with special circumstances First degree assault
- Penalty: Death

Details
- Date apprehended: March 2, 1996

Gunner Jay Lindberg (born March 1, 1975) is an American convicted murderer on death row in California. Lindberg, a neo-Nazi, was convicted of the 1996 murder of 24-year-old Vietnamese American Thien Minh Ly in Tustin, California.

Before the murder of Ly, Lindberg already had a history of assaults, the first at age 13. In October 1990, at age 15, Lindberg chased a migrant worker off a work site, calling him as a "wetback" before beating him with a tree branch and robbing him. The man had his arm broken and sustained severe cuts to the face. The same month, Lindberg assaulted a fellow teenager and committed a home invasion, during which he beat the elderly occupant after she gave him money. While imprisoned in Missouri, Lindberg became a member of the White Aryan Resistance and since 1994, Lindberg was also a letter correspondent with imprisoned Christian identity leader Gordon Mohr, who shared Lindberg's hostile views on Black and Asian people. He last served most of a five-year prison sentence for another first degree assault after shooting an 11-year-old boy three times with a pellet gun in 1992. One of the pellets had struck an artery and lodged in the heart of the boy.

On January 28, 1996, Lindberg wanted to celebrate that evening's Super Bowl XXX victory by the Dallas Cowboys by finding "a Jap". Lindberg and an accomplice, 17-year-old Domenic Michael Christopher, encountered Ly, who was rollerblading around the tennis courts at Tustin High School. Lindberg and Christopher trapped Ly on the courts, beat him, kicked him, and then stabbed him many times. Prosecutors also charged Lindberg with a hate crime and bullying.

While in Orange County jail, Lindberg attacked and injured two Vietnamese cellmates. He later made varying statements about his beliefs, claiming he was both a Christian and Satanist, as well as asserting he was half-Apache. He acknowledged that his accomplice Christopher was half-Japanese, but that he accepted Christopher as he was apparently also half-Apache.

Christopher was sentenced to 25 years to life in prison and was released in April 2023.

On August 29, 2008, the Supreme Court of California affirmed Lindberg's convictions and death sentence.

== See also ==
- List of death row inmates in the United States
