= Hillburn, New York =

- Village
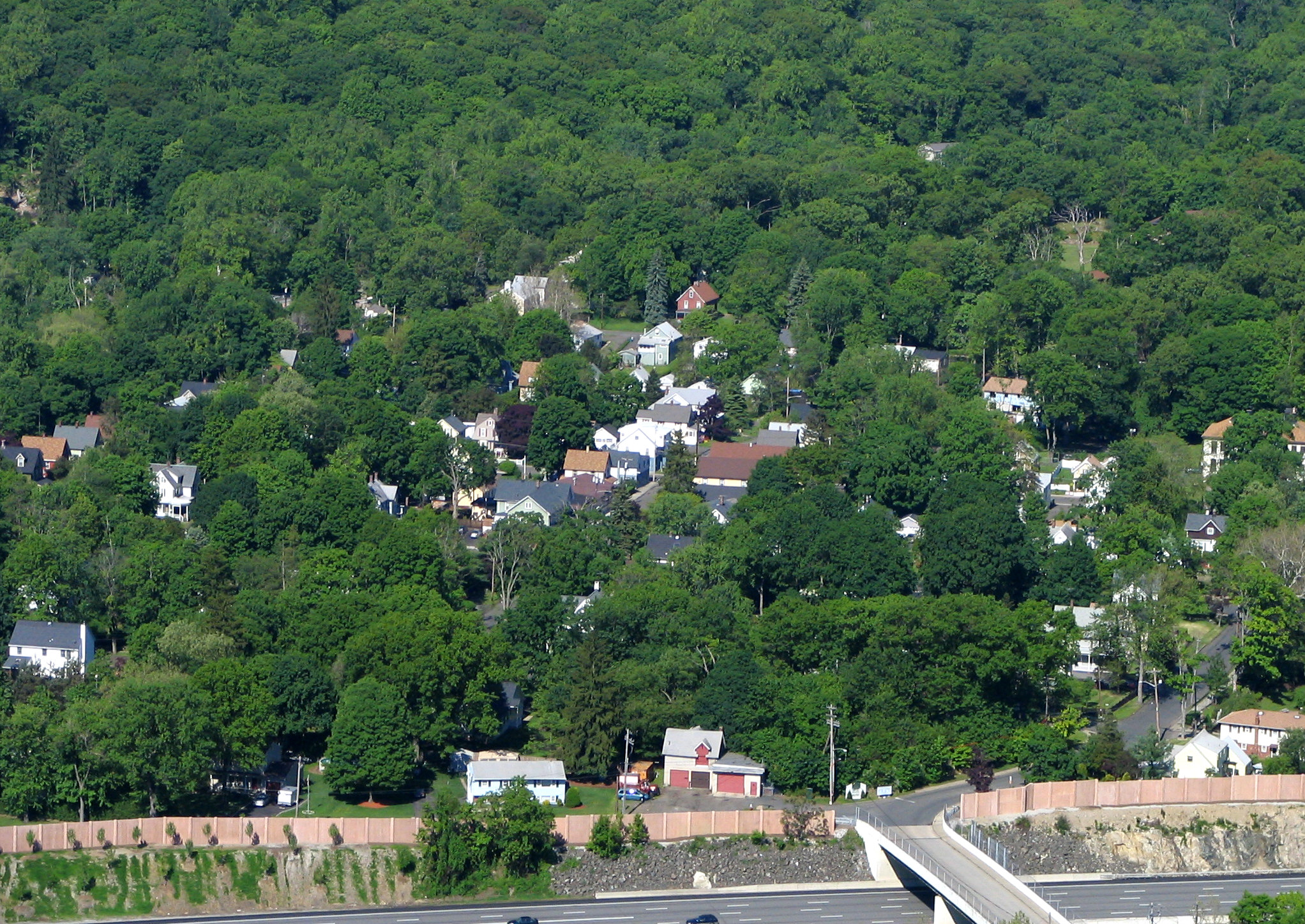
- View of Hillburn from Nordkop Mountain, looking west; NY State Thruway in foreground

- Location in Rockland County and the state of New York.

- Location within the state of New York
- Coordinates: 41°7′29″N 74°9′57″W
- Country: United States
- State: New York
- County: Rockland
- Town: Ramapo
- Incorporated: 1893

Government
  - Mayor: Joseph P. Tursi
  - Trustees: Bernadette Tarantino and David H. McNally

Area
  - Total: 2.25 sq mi (5.83 km^{2})
  - Land: 2.23 sq mi (5.78 km^{2})
  - Water: 0.019 sq mi (0.05 km^{2})
- Elevation: 305 ft (93 m)

Population (2020)
  - Total: 930
  - Density: 416.4/sq mi (160.77/km^{2})
- Time zone: UTC-5 (EST)
  - Summer (DST): UTC-4 (EDT)
- ZIP code: 10931
- Area code: 845
- FIPS code: 36-34660
- GNIS feature ID: 0952811
- Website: http://www.hillburn.org/

Hillburn, originally called "Woodburn" and incorporated in 1893, is a village in the town of Ramapo, Rockland County, New York, United States. It is located north of Suffern, east of Orange County, south of Viola, and west of Montebello. It is considered to be one of the more rural communities in Rockland County. The population was 930 at the 2020 census.

== History ==
In addition to later European-American migrants, the area was settled early by descendants of Lenape and other remnant groups, who eventually intermarried with Afro-Dutch and other ethnicities after the Revolutionary War. These multiracial descendants were recognized in 1980 by the state as the Ramapough Mountain Indians; they also have centers of population in Mahwah and Ringwood, New Jersey, which were areas of frontier in the eighteenth and early nineteenth centuries. For many years they lived by farming, hunting and fishing. They tended to marry within their community until the mid-twentieth century.

The village of Hillburn was founded in 1893; that year the first school in Hillburn was built on a plot of ground donated by J.B. Suffern.

In 1943, the attorney Thurgood Marshall won a disparity case regarding integration of the schools of Hillburn, 11 years before his landmark case of Brown v. Board of Education. He represented the village's African-American parents. In 2010, the state legislature designated May 17 as Thurgood Marshall Day in honor of his work in civil rights. Mixed-race children who lived in the town of Ramapo attended the Brook School in Hillburn, a wood structure that did not have a library, indoor bathrooms or gymnasium. The Main School was reserved for white children and included a gymnasium, a library and indoor plumbing.

== Geography ==
Hillburn is adjacent to the New Jersey border, on the southeastern edge of the Ramapo Mountains. It is immediately south of Harriman and Sterling Forest state parks. The village is bisected by the Ramapo River. According to the United States Census Bureau, the village has a total area of 2.2 square miles (5.7 km^{2}), of which 2.2 square miles (5.7 km^{2}) is land and 0.04 square miles (0.10 km^{2}), or 0.89%, is water.

== Demographics ==
Historical population
Census	Pop.	Note	%±
1900	824		—
1910	1,090		32.3%
1920	1,112		2.0%
1930	1,303		17.2%
1940	1,161		−10.9%
1950	1,212		4.4%
1960	1,114		−8.1%
1970	1,058		−5.0%
1980	926		−12.5%
1990	892		−3.7%
2000	881		−1.2%
2010	951		7.9%
2020	930		−2.2%
U.S. Decennial Census

As of the census of 2020, there were 930 people, 297 households, and 214 families residing in the village. The population density was 395.5 inhabitants per square mile (152.7/km^{2}). There were 403 housing units at an average density of 130.2 per square mile (50.3/km^{2}). The racial makeup of the village in 2023 was 48.1% white, 18.3% African American, 5.9% Native American, 0.9% Asian, 41.7% from other races. Hispanic or Latino of any race were 40.0% of the population.

There were 297 households in 2020, out of which 42.1% had children under the age of 18 living with them, 54.5% were married couples living together, 17.5% had a female householder with no husband present, and 27.9% were non-families. 21.5% of all households were made up of individuals, and 46.5% had someone living alone who was 60 years of age or older. The average household size was 3.45 and the average family size was 4.20.

In the village, the population was spread out as of 2020, with 30.6% under the age of 18, 9.6% from 18 to 24, 39.8% from 15 to 44, 22.1% from 45 to 64, and 13.6% who were 65 years of age or older. The median age was 33.4 years. For every 100 females, there were 82.2 males.

The median income for a household in the village in 2020 was $72.574, and the median income for a family was $80.795. About 11.7% of families and 16.5% of the population were below the poverty line, including 21.2% of those under age 18 and 9.3% of those age 65 or over.

== Arts and culture ==
=== Historical markers ===
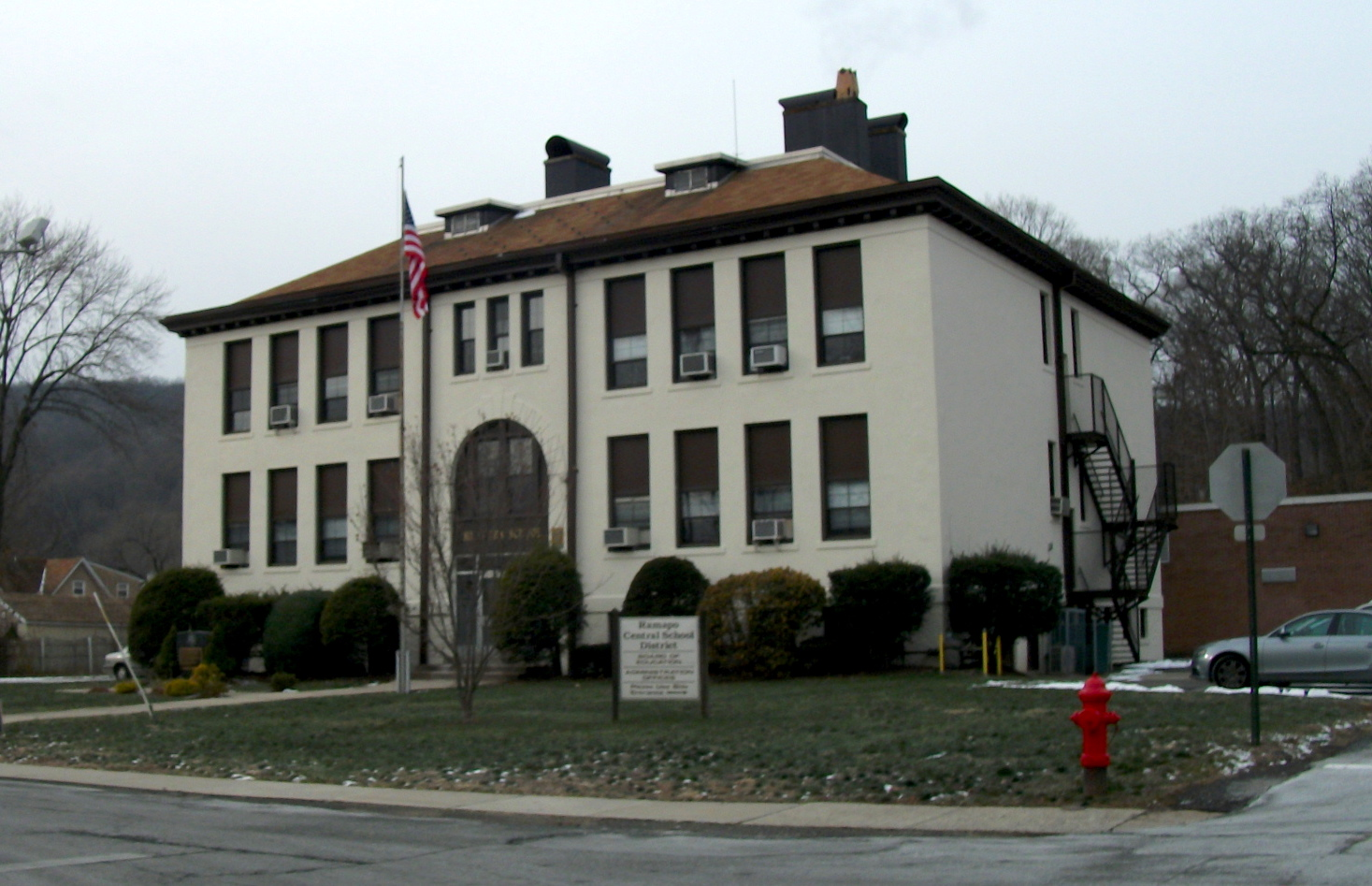
Former Main School

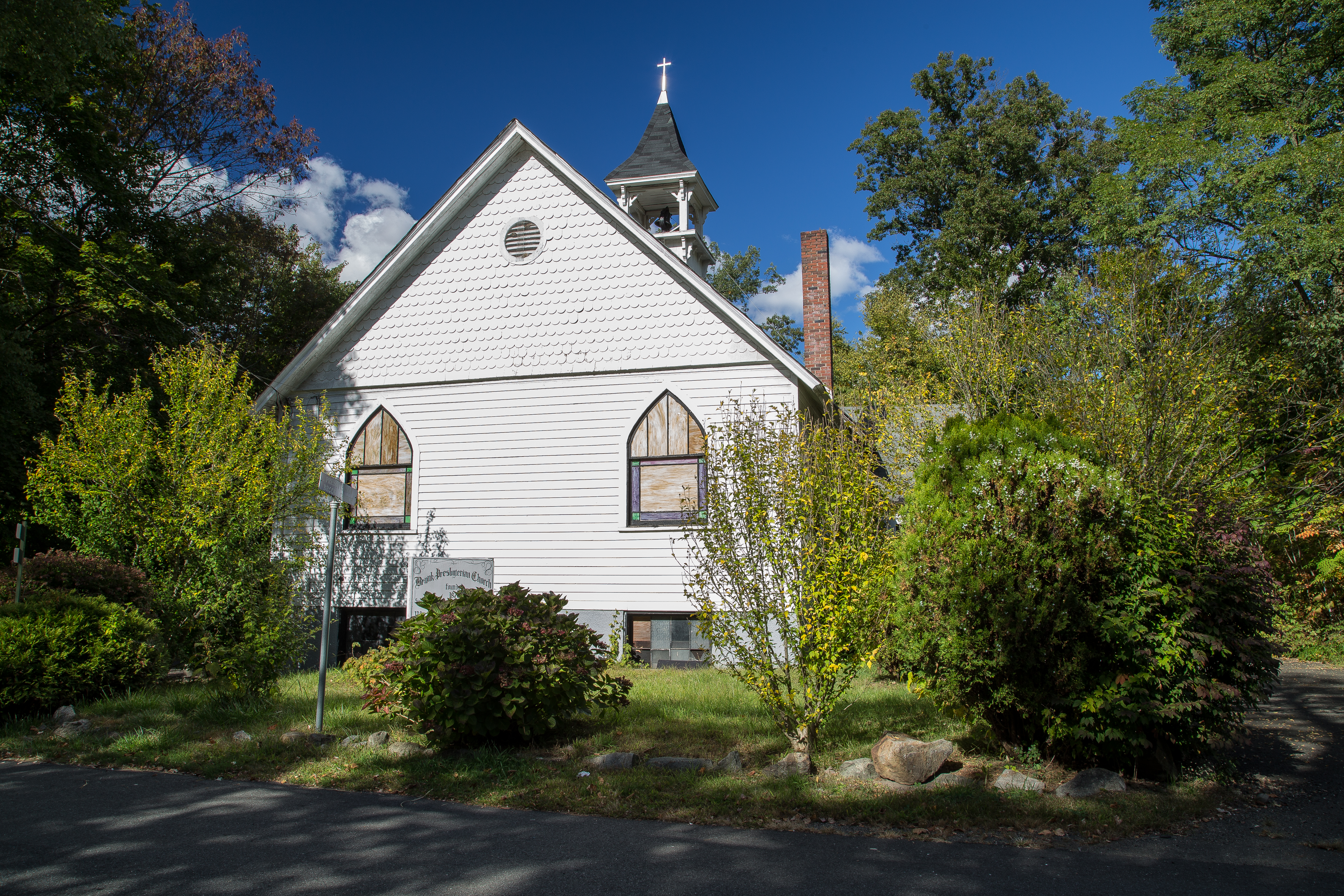
Brook Chapel

- Post at Ramapough/Sidman’s Bridge - Route 17
- Site of Camp Ramapaugh and Intrenchments - Torne Valley Road
- Site of Kellogg & Maurice Railroad Bridge - Route 59
- Thurgood Marshall - 45 Mountain Avenue
- William W. Snow House, Fourth Street & Terrace Avenue

=== Landmarks and places of interest ===
- Brook Chapel - historic chapel, 1893 (NRHP)

== Education ==
Hillburn is located within the Suffern Central School District. The district's administrative building is located here.
