= Algeania Freeman =

American academic administrator

20th President of Wilberforce University
- In office 2014–2016
- Preceded by: Wilma Mishoe (interim)
- Succeeded by: Herman J. Felton, Jr.

2nd President of Martin University
- In office January 2008 – December 31, 2010
- Preceded by: Boniface Hardin
- Succeeded by: Charlotte Westerhaus (acting)

11th President of Livingstone College
- In office February 1, 2000 – 2004
- Preceded by: Albert J. D. Aymer (interim)
- Succeeded by: Catrelia Steele Hunter (interim)

Personal details
- Born: January 24, 1949 (age 77) Dunn, North Carolina, U.S.
- Education: Fayetteville State University; Southern Illinois University Carbondale; Ohio State University

Algeania Marie Warren Freeman (born January 24, 1949) is an American speech communications professor and academic administrator who served as the twentieth president Wilberforce University from 2014 to 2016. She was previously the president of Martin University from 2008 to 2010 and Livingstone College from 2000 to 2004.

== Life ==
Freeman was born January 24, 1949, in Dunn, North Carolina. She completed a B.S. in English at Fayetteville State University in 1970. In 1972, she earned a M.S. in speech pathology and audiology from Southern Illinois University Carbondale. From 1972 to 1973, Freeman was a speech pathologist at the Americana Nursing Center in Decatur, Illinois.

Freeman joined Norfolk State University as an instructor in 1973. In 1977, she earned a Ph.D. in speech communications at Ohio State University. Her dissertation was titled, Two Strategies Used in Retraining Aphasic Adults. John W. Black was her doctoral advisor. Freeman conducted postdoctoral studies at the Harvard University institute for the management of lifelong education and the institute for management development.

In 1977, Freeman was an assistant professor and chair of the department of speech communications and theatre arts at North Carolina A&T State University. She later worked as a faculty member or administrator at Morgan State University, East Tennessee State University, and Orange Coast College. She was a vice president of advancement and program development at Southern California College. Freeman returned to Norfolk State University where she was a tenured professor of speech communications and served as the acting vice president of advancement. From February 1, 2000, to 2004, Freeman served as the eleventh president of Livingstone College. She was its first female president. In January 2008, Freeman became the second president of Martin University, succeeding Boniface Hardin. She retired on December 31, 2010. She was succeeded by acting president Charlotte Westerhaus. In 2014, Freeman succeeded interim president Wilma Mishoe as the twentieth president of Wilberforce University. She retired in 2016.

== Personal life ==
Freeman married Earnest Freeman.
