= Claibourne Smith =

American chemist and educational administrator

- Born: January 6, 1938 (age 88); Memphis, Tennessee
- Education: University of Denver (BS, MS); University of Oregon (Ph.D.)
- Occupations: Chemist, Educational administrator
- Board member of: Delaware State University Board of Trustees
- Spouse: Roseann Smith

Claibourne Smith (born January 6, 1938) is an African American chemist. He worked at DuPont and served on the Board of Trustees of Delaware State University and on the Delaware State Board of Education. He was acting president of Delaware State University from 2008 to 2010.

== Early life and education ==
Smith was born in Memphis, Tennessee, where he graduated from Melrose High School. He earned a BS and an MS in chemistry from the University of Denver while working at the Denver Research Institute in chemical synthesis. In 1964, he earned a PhD in organic chemistry from the University of Oregon.

== Career ==
Smith worked for 34 years at DuPont, first as a research chemist and subsequently in marketing. At his retirement in 1998, he was vice president of technology and vice chairman of corporation education aid.

After voluntary work assisting the chemistry department at Delaware State University, a historically black university, Smith was appointed to the board of trustees in 1987–88 as a replacement for a board member who had resigned. Except for during his acting presidency of the university, he served on the board for 28 years, from 1993 to 2015 as chairman; he left the board at the expiration of his term in January 2016 and was appointed trustee emeritus. In 2015, when he resigned the chairmanship, the board voted to name the university's administration building for him.

Smith was appointed acting president of Delaware State University in 2008 after the resignation of Allen Sessoms. He served until January 2010, when Harry L. Williams succeeded to the position.

Smith served two terms on the Delaware State Board of Education, from 1993 to 2005. He also served at the state level on the Leadership and Assistance for Science Education Reform Advisory Board and the Delaware Council on Crime and Justice and was a member of the board of directors of the Fair Housing Council of Delaware.

== Honors ==
Smith was awarded the Dean's Alumni Achievement Award of the University of Oregon in 1989 and The News Journal's Jefferson Awards Certificate of Excellence in 1994. In 2006 he received the Distinguished Service Award of the National Association of State Boards of Education. In 2009 he was honored by the Delaware state YMCA as one of its Black Achievers in Business and Industry.

== Personal life ==
Smith is married to Roseann Smith, whom he met at DuPont.
