= Yvonne Walker-Taylor =

American college president (1931–2006)

16th President of Wilberforce University
- In office 1984–1988
- Preceded by: Charles E. Taylor
- Succeeded by: John L. Henderson

Personal details
- Born: Yvonne Walker; April 16, 1931
- Died: October 25, 2006 (aged 75)
- Education: Wilberforce University; Boston University; University of Kansas

Yvonne Walker-Taylor (April 16, 1931 – October 25, 2006) was an American academic administrator who served as the 16th president of Wilberforce University. She was one of the first female African American four year college presidents in the United States.

== Biography ==
Walker-Taylor née Walker was born on April 16, 1931. She was the daughter of Eva Emma Revallion and Dougal Ormonde Walker (1890–1955). Her father was a bishop in the African Methodist Episcopal Church and the tenth president of Wilberforce University.

She attended Wilberforce University, Boston University, and the University of Kansas. She began her teaching career as a high school teacher, becoming a college professor in the 1950s.

In the 1970s she began serving in an administrative capacity at Wilberforce, first as academic dean then provost of the college.

In 1984 Walker-Taylor was named the 16th president of Wilberforce University, becoming the first female African American college president in the United States. She served as president until retiring in 1988. She went on to work at Central State University as a visiting education professor and then as interim president of Payne Theological Seminary.

Walker-Taylor was a member of many community organizations including The Links, the NAACP, and was Golden Soror of Alpha Kappa Alpha sorority. She was active in the African Methodist Episcopal Church serving as choir director and as a Trustee.

Walker-Taylor died on October 25, 2006. She was inducted into the Ohio Women's Hall of Fame in 2000.
