= Jane Edward Schilling =

American activist, educator, religious sister (1930–2017)

Jane Edward Schilling CSJ
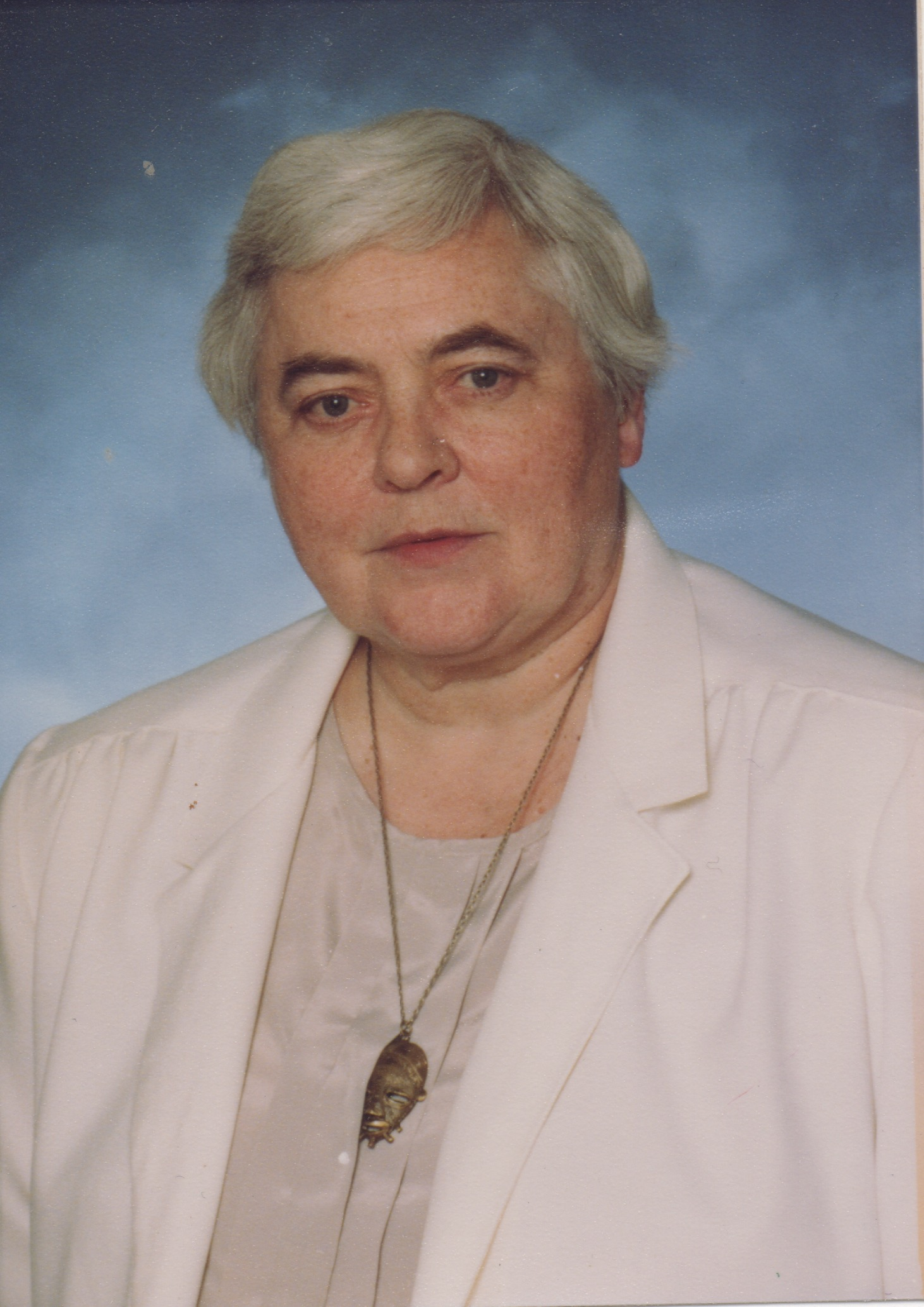
- Born: Nancy Schilling; October 8, 1930; Minocqua, Wisconsin
- Died: September 13, 2017 (aged 86); St. Louis, Missouri
- Education: Fontbonne University; Loyola University Chicago
- Occupations: Educator, social activist

Jane Edward Schilling, CSJ (October 8, 1930 – September 13, 2017) was an American activist, historian, university administrator, and religious sister who served as founding vice president of Martin University in Indianapolis, Indiana. She was a member of the Sisters of St. Joseph of Carondelet.

== Early life ==
Born Nancy Mary Schilling in 1930 in the lake resort town of Minocqua, Wisconsin, Jane Schilling was the eldest of five children of Lyle Franklin Schilling, a dentist, and wife, Rosalie Julia Wolk Schilling, a homemaker. Early on, Nancy excelled in athletics and scholarship. Finding that her high school did not offer the courses she needed to take in order to become a dentist like her father, she moved to Green Bay, Wisconsin to live with two aunts to attend St. Joseph's Academy for junior and senior high school. During this period, she found that she had a vocation to follow in the footsteps of her teachers and become a Sister of St. Joseph of Carondolet.

During her formation with the Sisters of St. Joseph, she received the name Sister Jane Edward, a combination of her younger sister's and brother's names. An avid scholar, she received her bachelor's degree in European and American History at Fontbonne University in Saint Louis and her Master's of Ancient History at Loyola University in Chicago. Following her first assignment as a teacher in St. Rita's School in St. Louis, she was next assigned to St. Matthew's School in the inner city. Here, she developed a passion for civil rights and social justice. She assisted with curriculum development for students at the Saint Louis hospital for black residents, Homer G. Phillips, and assisted in ministering to ex-convicts at nearby Dismas House], established by Father Charles "Dismas" Clark and Morris Shenker.

== Holy Angels ==
In 1964, Schilling's was assigned to teach at Holy Angels Catholic School in Indianapolis, Indiana, a school that had transitioned to a majority black student population. She embraced this role with high energy, establishing a drum and bugle corps to increase school pride and visibility within the community. After she was named principal, she engaged in implementing educational reforms of the time, such as open classrooms, right/left brain teaching, and psychomotor approaches for teaching reading.

Shortly after her arrival at Holy Angels, Schilling's life was radically changed when a new Associate Pastor at Holy Angels Parish, Boniface Hardin, arrived on the scene. The two shared a commitment to education and social change, a bond that created a partnership that would last for the remainder of their lives.

Working together, Schilling and Hardin became activists in church and community reform. They fought police brutality and targeting of black citizens, de facto school segregation, lack of representation of black clergy and traditions within the Catholic Church, poverty, and unfair housing practices. A key focus became the fight to prevent a major highway, Interstate 65, from bifurcating the predominately black northwest neighborhood surrounding Holy Angels Parish.

When police pressure on the Archbishop of Indianapolis, Paul Schulte, triggered a decision to remove Hardin from Holy Angels Parish in 1969, parishioners rose up and staged a nationally publicized demonstration in Saints Peter and Paul Cathedral where the Archbishop was presiding at Easter services. Although the Archbishop rescinded his order, Hardin left Holy Angels to found Martin Center, an educational and social justice center, at the close of 1969. Within a year, Schilling received permission from her religious community to work full-time at Martin Center as Education Coordinator.

== The Martin Center ==
Martin Center was named for Martin Luther King Jr. and St. Martin de Porres, patron saint, within the Catholic Church, of poor and mixed race people. Its mission evolved from an initial goal of educating clergy and white people about discriminatory attitudes and practices to include celebrating black cultural heritage and engaging black community members in activism and self-identity. While Hardin traveled as a speaker and consultant to raise funds for the center, Schilling became the day-to-day administrator.

Drawing on her background as a history scholar, Schilling did the research and production of designs and materials for workshops, speeches, and activities of Martin Center. Soon, the mission of the Center expanded to include the Martin Sickle Cell Center which received major national funding to educate the community and screen for this disease, and the Afro-American Institute, which focused on African and African-American culture and achievements. Schilling served as Director of Community Education at the Sickle Cell Center from 1970 to 1977 and received its award for 25 Years of Dedication to Sickle Cell and Visionary Leadership.

Through the Afro-American Institute, Martin Center housed a library of materials and artifacts, created and acquired by Schilling and Hardin. They also produced a regular scholarly periodical, the Afro-American Journal (1973–78); two full-length TV documentaries—The Kingdom Builders and For Love of Freedom—for the local NBC affiliate in Indianapolis; a weekly radio program, The Afro-American in Indiana (1971–1991) for WIAN, the local public radio station; and a weekly television show, Afro-American (1974–79), for public television. Schilling co-hosted these programs and was the major researcher behind the productions.

As Martin Center expanded its educational offerings to the community, it collaborated with Indiana University Purdue University-Indianapolis to create courses for college credit. This venture led Schilling and Hardin to found Indiana's only minority serving institution, Martin University.

== Martin University ==
From the start, Schilling's role in the creation and growth of Martin University was chief academic officer, strategist, and educational developer. As Founding Vice President for Academic Affairs, she was a key voice in articulating the philosophy behind the institution, inspired by the concept of “andragogy” advanced by Malcolm Knowles. The approach emphasized drawing on the strengths and past experience of adult learners, the major population of the university. Through her hiring decisions and curriculum and faculty development efforts, Schilling collaborated with Hardin to become the guiding force behind the school's educational direction.

Schilling presided over Academic Affairs at Martin University from its early beginnings with a handful of students in 1977 as Martin Center College, through 1979 as Martin College became a separate entity from Martin Center, and finally through 1990, when the addition of graduate programs enabled the change to Martin University, a school with nearly 1000 students. She was the key architect of successful accreditation and expansion proposals to the North Central Association of Colleges and Schools (changed in 2014 to the Higher Learning Commission). She became known at Martin for her sense of humor and the compassion she showed students through acts such as serving soup to those who came directly from work to classes.

While Vice President of Martin University, Schilling participated in numerous initiatives within the Indianapolis community, including serving on the Crispus Attucks Museum Committee and acting as consultant and workshop facilitator for the Indianapolis Public Schools. She continued to guide the Martin Center, serving as its executive director from 1984 to 1988.

Schilling received a number of Martin University Awards. These included the Mary McLeod Bethune Award and the Martin University Board of Trustees Wind Under Our Wings Award. In 2005, she received the Honorary Doctor of Laws degree from Martin University. After 30 years of service, Schilling retired from Martin University in 2007. She died on September 13, 2017, at Nazareth Living House, Sisters of St. Joseph of Carondolet, St. Louis.

== Community Awards ==
WIAN-FM Outstanding Service Award

Leadership in Education Award, Indianapolis Education Association

Dr. Martin Luther King, Jr. Drum Major Award, Indiana Christian Leadership Conference

Dr. Martin Luther King, Jr. 1995 Individual Award, Madame Walker Institute, Indianapolis

Diamond Award, United to Serve America

Service to the Black Community, King-Walker-Wilkins-Young Awards Committee

Paul Harris Fellow, Rotary International

Heroism Award, American Red Cross

Sagamore of the Wabash, Governor of Indiana

Role Modelship Award, Wheeler Boys and Girls Club

Mother of the Year, Nur-Allah Islamic Center, Indianapolis

100 Heros, United Way of Central Indiana
