= Floyd Flake =

AME pastor and former politician

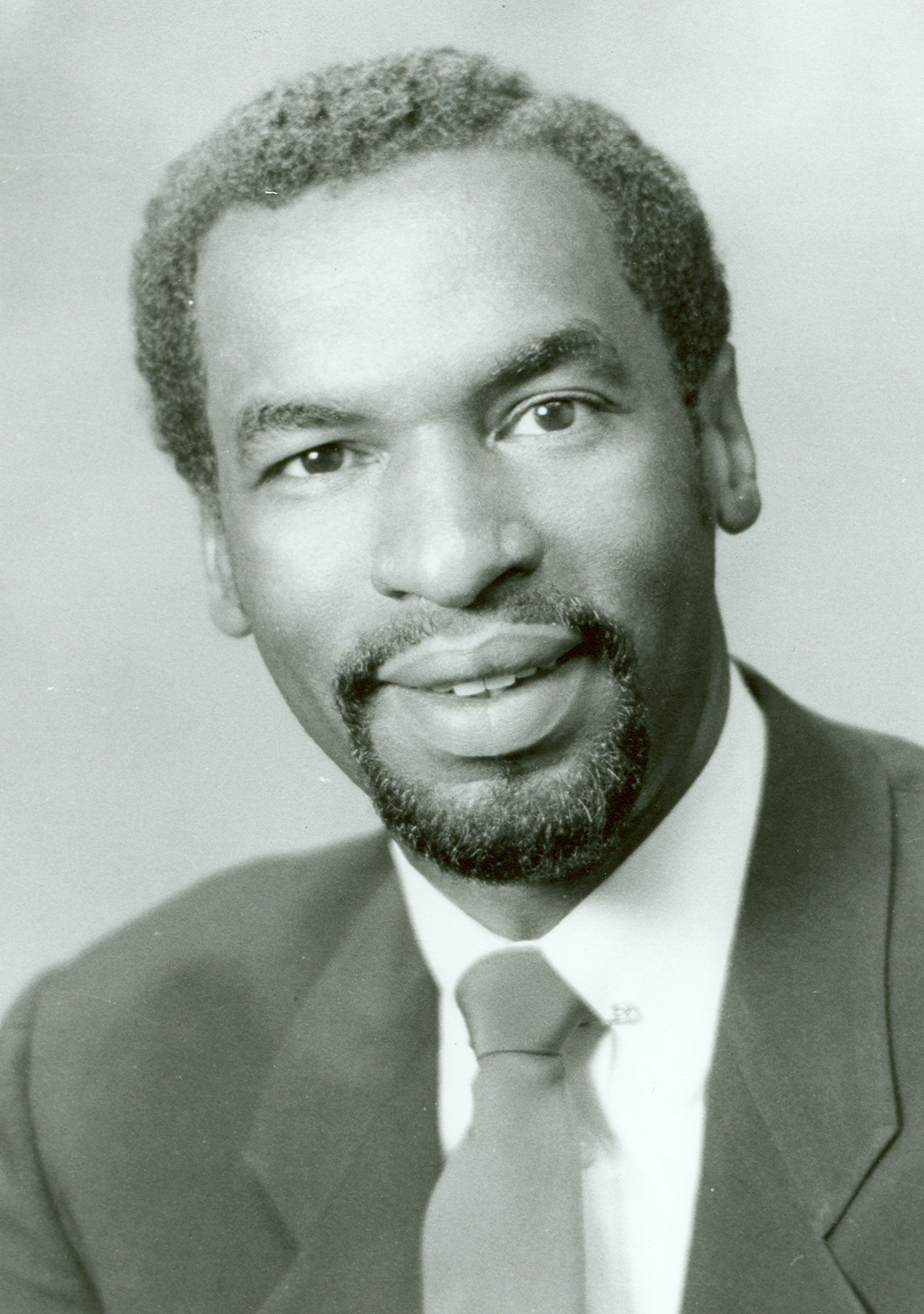

18th President of Wilberforce University
- In office 2002–2008
- Preceded by: John Henderson
- Succeeded by: Patricia Hardaway

Member of the U.S. House of Representatives from New York's 6th district
- In office January 3, 1987 – November 17, 1997
- Preceded by: Alton Waldon
- Succeeded by: Gregory Meeks

Personal details
- Born: Floyd Harold Flake; January 30, 1945 (age 81) Los Angeles, California, U.S.
- Party: Democratic
- Spouse: Margaret McCollins
- Children: 4
- Education: Wilberforce University (BA); Northeastern University; St. John's University; Payne Theological Seminary; United Theological Seminary (MDiv, DMin)

Floyd Harold Flake (born January 30, 1945) is an American businessman, minister, and former politician who was the senior pastor of the 23,000-member Greater Allen African Methodist Episcopal Cathedral in Jamaica, Queens, New York, and the 18th president of Wilberforce University. He is a former member of the United States House of Representatives, serving from 1987 to 1997.

== Early life and education ==
Born in Los Angeles, California, Flake grew up in Houston, Texas, as one of fifteen children of Robert Flake, Sr. and Rosie Lee Johnson-Flake. During his childhood, he was influenced by his parents' Christian moral beliefs. After high school, he obtained his Bachelor of Arts degree from Wilberforce University in Wilberforce, Ohio, becoming the first member of his family to graduate from college.

Flake earned a Master of Divinity and Doctor of Ministry from the United Theological Seminary in Dayton, Ohio. Additional studies were conducted at Payne Theological Seminary and Northeastern University School of Business. He received honorary degrees from Boston University, Fisk University, Lincoln University, and the Cheyney University of Pennsylvania.

== Career ==
He served as a social worker and then worked for Xerox as a marketing analyst. Flake next worked as director of student affairs at Lincoln University and dean of students and director of the Afro-American Center at Boston University. In 1976, he was asked to head the Allen African Methodist Episcopal Church (now The Greater Allen Cathedral of New York). Under Flake's leadership, the church grew from having about 1,400 members to over 23,000 parishioners.

Flake served as president of Wilberforce University from 2002 to 2008, leaving under heavy, publicized scrutiny and severe critique over his impact on the school. He is a political patron of New York Senate Democratic Leader Malcolm Smith and Democratic U.S. Representative Gregory Meeks. Despite his affiliation with the Democratic party, in 2006 he was the co-chair of conservative Republican Ken Blackwell's (R) campaign for governor of Ohio and endorsed Michael Bloomberg in the 2005 New York City mayoral election.

=== Political career ===
In 1986, he defeated incumbent Democratic congressman Alton Waldon in the primary and was elected to the 100th United States Congress from the New York's 6th congressional district, which included Jamaica, Queens, and most of its surrounding neighborhoods, stretching from Ozone Park and Woodhaven to the border with Nassau County. He remained in the House of Representatives until 1997, when he resigned in the middle of a term in order to return to work at his church full-time.

In Congress, Flake garnered a reputation for working with conservative Republicans, despite representing an overwhelmingly liberal, Democratic district. He also endorsed Republicans George Pataki for New York State Governor and Rudy Giuliani for New York City mayor.

In 1991, Flake joined an amicus brief in support of the New York City Council in the case Richmond Boro Gun Club v. City of New York, which upheld the council's prohibition on "the possession or transfer" within New York City of "assault weapons" and certain ammunition feeding devices.

=== Business interests ===
Flake has an ownership interest in Aqueduct Race Track Entertainment Group (AEG) which in January 2010 was awarded a contract to operate a 4,500 slot machine racino at the Aqueduct Race Track by then-Governor David Paterson. The process generated controversy after claims had been made that Paterson required affirmative action ownership in the company (rapper Jay-Z also joined AEG), that AEG was allowed to change its bid from the lowest to the highest and because Paterson allegedly awarded the bid two days after Flake threatened to back Andrew Cuomo in the 2010 governor race. U.S. prosecutors reportedly investigated the process and New York house speaker Sheldon Silver threatened not to sign off on the deal. Paterson has maintained there was no quid pro quo. On March 9, 2010, Flake withdrew from the project saying that it was distracting from his other projects. Jay-Z and Paterson also withdrew from the projects.

=== Greater Allen A. M. E. Cathedral of New York ===
Flake is the senior pastor of the Greater Allen A. M. E. Cathedral of New York in Jamaica, Queens, New York City. According to a published marketing message, "The church and its subsidiary corporations operate with an annual budget of over $34 million. The church also owns expansive commercial and residential developments; a 750-student private school founded by Flake and his wife Elaine, and various commercial and social service enterprises, which has placed it among the nation's most productive religious and urban development institutions. The corporations, church administrative offices, school, and ministries comprise one of the Borough of Queens' largest private sector employers." The Church is recognized as a major real estate developer.

=== Other work ===
Flake serves as a member of the following boards: (1) The President's Commission on Excellence in Special Education; (2) The Fannie Mae Foundation; (3) The Princeton Review; (4) The New York City Investment Fund Civic Capital Corporation; (5) the Federal Deposit Insurance Corporation Advisory Committee on Banking Policy and (6) the Bank of America National Advisory Board. He is also a fellow at the Manhattan Institute for Policy Research.

In honor of his role as a Queens community leader, Merrick Boulevard in southeastern Queens was renamed for Flake in October 2020.

== Personal life ==
Flake is married to Margaret Elaine McCollins and has four children.

In 1990, Flake and his wife were indicted for alleged fraud and embezzlement of church funds. The couple pleaded not guilty. In 1991, after hearing three weeks of prosecution witnesses, the judge assigned to the case dismissed so much of the prosecutor's case that he opted to drop all remaining charges. Interviews with jurors afterward indicated that, had the prosecutor opted to continue prosecution, the jury would not have found the couple guilty of any of these remaining charges.

== Publications ==
External videos
- Booknotes interview with Flake on The Way of the Bootstrapper, July 4, 1999, C-SPAN

Flake has published several books, including The Way of the Bootstrapper: Nine Action Steps for Achieving Your Dreams (ISBN 0-06-251596-9) in 1999.

== See also ==
- List of African-American United States representatives

U.S. House of Representatives
Preceded by Alton Waldon	Member of the U.S. House of Representatives from New York's 6th congressional district 1987–1997	Succeeded by Gregory Meeks
U.S. order of precedence (ceremonial)
Preceded by Robert J. Mrazek as Former U.S. Representative	Order of precedence of the United States as Former U.S. Representative	Succeeded by Bill Paxon as Former U.S. Representative
