= Loockerman Hall =

Historic house in Delaware, United States

- U.S. National Register of Historic Places
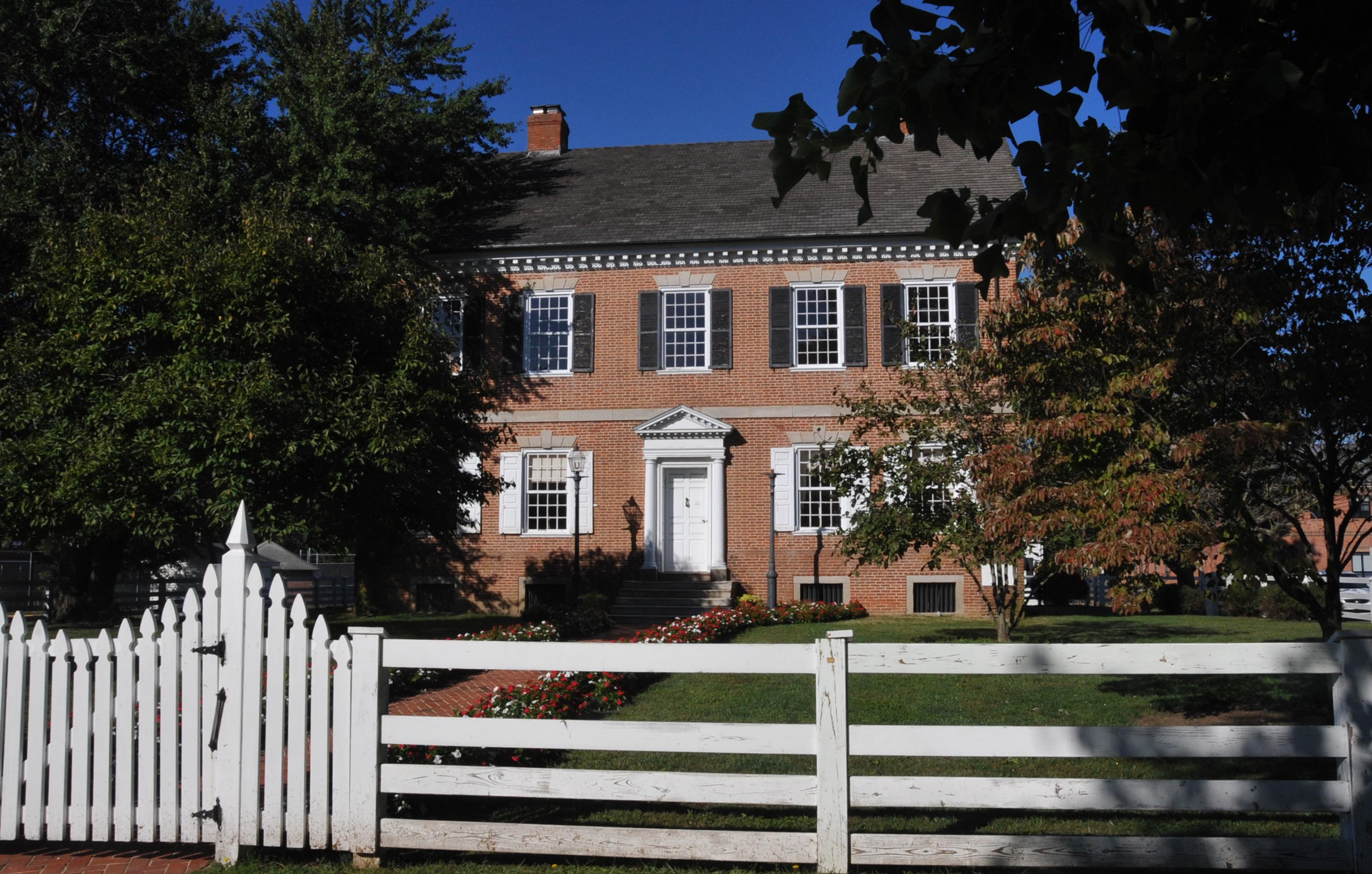
- Loockerman Hall, September 2012

- Location within Delaware Location within the United States
- Location: Delaware State College campus, Dover, Delaware
- Coordinates: 39°11′6″N 75°32′44″W
- Area: 4 acres (1.6 ha)
- Built: c. 1730
- Architectural style: Georgian
- NRHP reference No.: 71000218
- Added to NRHP: June 21, 1971

Loockerman Hall is an historic home located on the campus of Delaware State University at Dover, Kent County, Delaware. It dates to before 1730, and is a large, two-story, brick plantation home in the Georgian style. It measures 40 feet by 50 feet. It was the first building on the campus of the Delaware State College, originally established as the State College for Colored Students by an act of the Delaware General Assembly on 15 May 1891. Therefore, it is associated with the founding of Delaware's efforts to provide higher education for its African-American students.

It was added to the National Register of Historic Places in 1971.
