= Patricia Hardaway =

American labor lawyer and academic administrator

19th President of Wilberforce University
- In office 2008 – December 31, 2013; Interim: 2008 – March 2009
- Preceded by: Floyd Flake
- Succeeded by: Wilma Mishoe (interim)

Personal details
- Education: Wilberforce University; University of Pittsburgh; Yeshiva University

Patricia Lofton Hardaway is an American labor lawyer and academic administrator who was the 19th president of Wilberforce University from 2008 to 2013. She has served as the interim chief human resources officer of the University of California since 2023.

== Life ==
Hardaway earned a B.A. in sociology from Wilberforce University. She completed a master of public works degree from the University of Pittsburgh Graduate School of Public and International Affairs. She received J.D. from the Benjamin N. Cardozo School of Law at Yeshiva University.

Hardaway is a labor lawyer who as worked on employment discrimination cases in New York, Connecticut, and New Jersey. She was the first woman chair of the Wilberforce University board of trustees. In 2007, she became provost. The following year, she served as the interim president, succeeding Floyd Flake. In March 2009, she was named as the 19th president. She was the second female president of the university. After conflicts with the faculty association and student protests over dormitories and living conditions, Hardaway announced in July 2013 that she would resign on December 31. She was succeeded by interim president Wilma Mishoe. Hardaway worked at the University of Pittsburgh, Rutgers University, Fairleigh Dickinson University, and Chatham College. Hardaway was the interim provost of Mills College at Northeastern University and oversaw the academic affairs division. In October 2022, she became the acting associate vice chancellor for staff human resources and chief human resource officer at the University of California, Santa Cruz. On August 7, 2023, she became the acting interim chief human resources officer of the University of California, succeeding Nancy Pluzdrak.
