= Delaware State University =

Historically black university in Dover, Delaware, US

Coordinates: 39.1861°N 75.5426°W

- Former names: Delaware College for Colored Students (1891–1893); State College for Colored Students (1893–1947); Delaware State College (1947–1993); Wilmington Conference Academy (1873–1918); Wesley Collegiate Institute (1918–1941); Wesley Junior College (1941–1958); Wesley College (1958–2021)
- Motto: "Enter to Learn, Go Forth and Serve"
- Type: Privately governed, state-assisted historically black land-grant research university
- Established: May 15, 1891; 135 years ago
- Accreditation: MSCHE
- Academic affiliations: TMCF
- Endowment: $43 million (2021)
- President: Tony Allen
- Faculty: 600
- Students: 7,407 (2026)
- Location: Dover, Delaware, United States
- Campus: 706 acres (2.86 km^{2}); Small city
- Other campuses: Georgetown; Wilmington
- Newspaper: The Hornet
- Colors: Dark blue, Columbia blue and red
- Nickname: Hornets
- Sporting affiliations: NCAA Division I FCS – MEAC; NEC; ASUN; ECAC
- Mascot: Too Fly
- Website: desu.edu

Delaware State University (DSU or Del State) is a privately governed, state-assisted historically black land-grant research university in Dover, Delaware, United States. DSU also has two satellite campuses: one in Wilmington and one in Georgetown. The university encompasses four colleges and a diverse population of undergraduate and advanced-degree students. Delaware State University is classified among "R2: Doctoral Universities – High research activity".

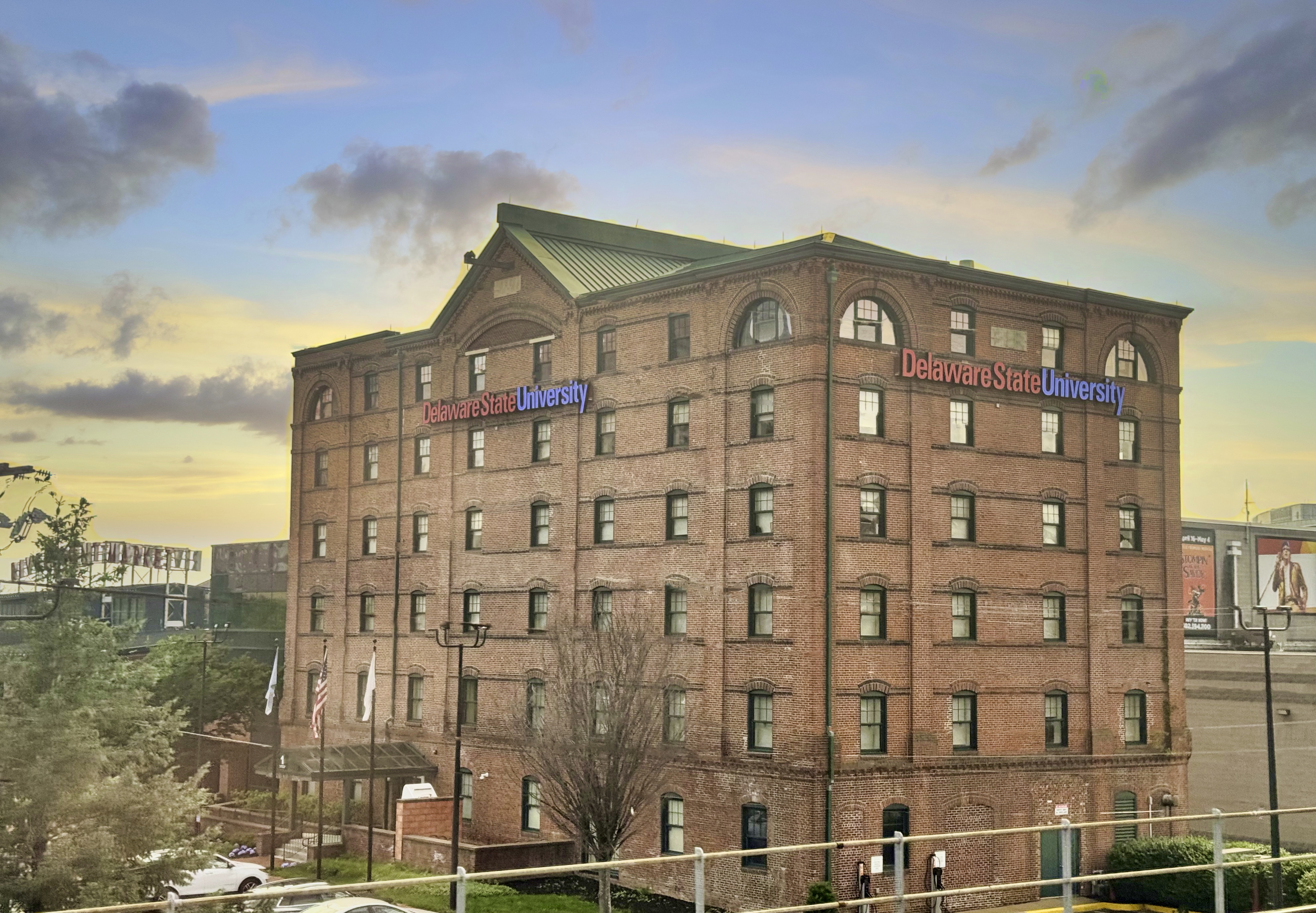
Delaware State University Riverfront building in Wilmington

== History ==
=== 19th century ===
The Delaware College for Colored Students was established on May 15, 1891, by the Delaware General Assembly. The name was changed to the State College for Colored Students by state legislative action in 1893 to eliminate confusion with Delaware College, which was attended by whites in Newark, Delaware. It first awarded degrees in 1898.

=== 20th century ===
In 1945, the Middle States Commission on Higher Education awarded the college provisional accreditation. Three years later, the institution became Delaware State College by legislative action. Although its accreditation was revoked in 1949, it was regained in 1957.

On July 1, 1993, the institution changed its name yet again, this time to Delaware State University. Delaware State University is one of the first historically black colleges and universities to have a no-smoking policy.

=== 21st century ===
==== 2007 shooting ====
On September 21, 2007, two 17-year-old Delaware State University freshmen were shot on campus. One died 32 days later on October 23, from critical injuries sustained in the attack. A freshman student from East Orange, New Jersey, Loyer D. Braden, was arrested and charged with murder.

==== Other events ====
In 2015, the university began phasing out smoking on campus by restricting it to four designated areas and providing educational resources on smoking cessation tools and programs. In August 2015 it implemented a completely tobacco-free policy.

In 2017, the university received the ACAS Health Leadership Award in recognition of its efforts. The award was jointly presented by the Public Health Service Officers Foundation for the Advancement of Public Health, the Truth Initiative, Arizonans Concerned About Smoking and the Arizona NAACP.

In December 2020, MacKenzie Scott donated $20 million to Delaware State University. Her donation is the largest single gift in the university's history.

On July 1, 2021, Delaware State University officially finalized its acquisition of Wesley College, a 157-year-old private institution founded by the Methodist Church in 1873. This acquisition makes Delaware State the first historically Black university to acquire an institution that is not a historically Black college or university.

The university has renamed the former Wesley campus "DSU Downtown", reflecting its close proximity to downtown Dover, Delaware, and has relocated most of its College of Health and Behavioral Science (Public and Allied Health, Psychology, and Social Work programs on that additional 41-acre site. That academic division has been renamed the Wesley College of Health and Behavioral Sciences as a way to preserve the history of the former Wesley College.

== Campus ==
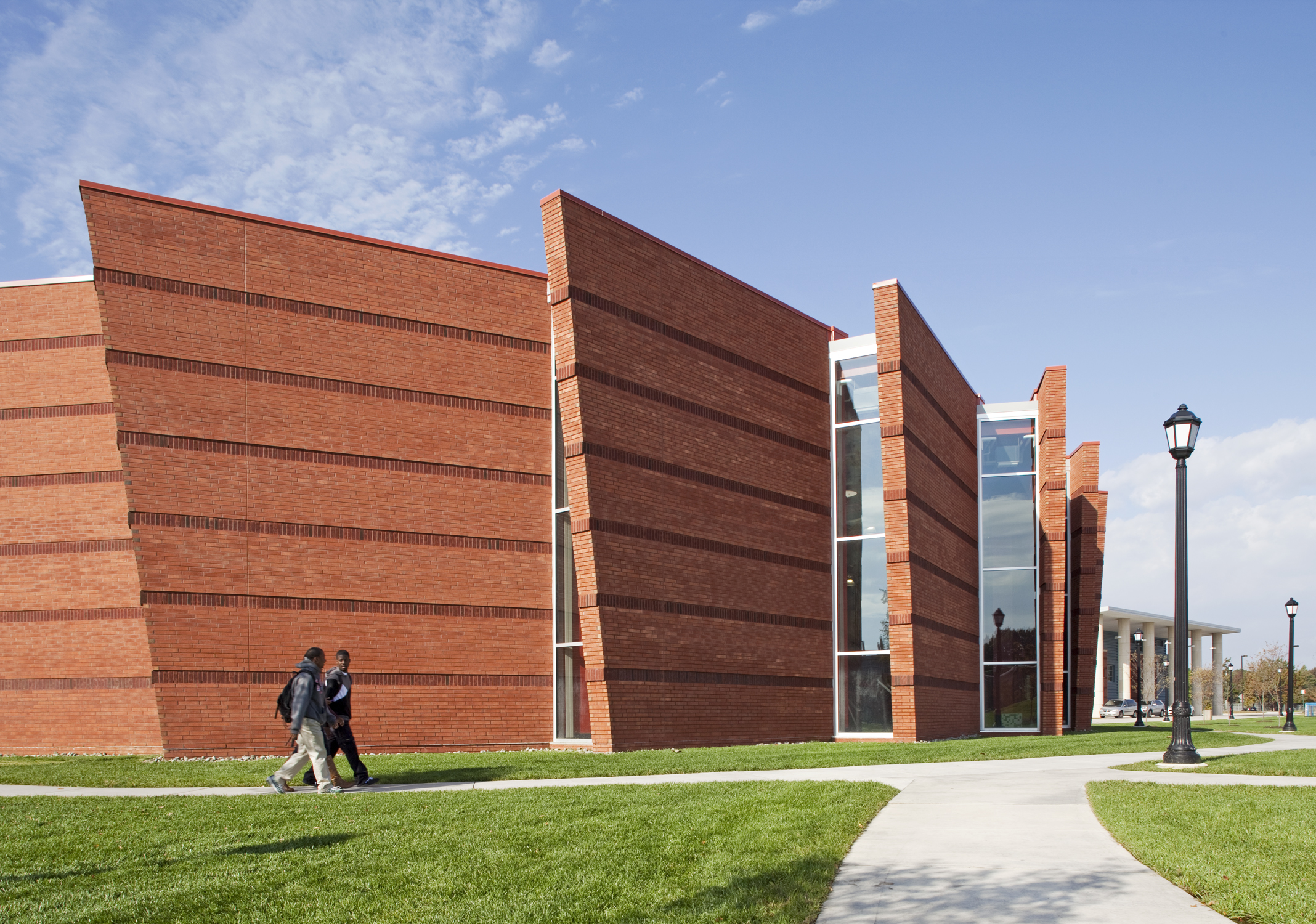
Delaware State University's Wellness and Recreation Center

The 400-acre (1.6 km^{2}) main campus in Dover, the capital of Delaware, is approximately a two-hour drive from Philadelphia, Baltimore, and Washington, D.C., and three hours from New York City. The university has two satellite campuses located in Wilmington and Georgetown.

The main campus in Dover contains thirty buildings, including:

- Administration Building
- Alumni Stadium
- Memorial Hall
- The Bank of America Building
- Delaware Hall
- The Education and Humanities Building & Theatre
- Loockerman Hall – listed on the National Register of Historic Places in 1971
- The Mishoe Science Center
- Price Building
- Willam C. Jason Library
- The Wellness and Recreation Center
- The Optical Science Center for Applied Research

On the main campus there are five main campus traditional residential halls and three apartment-style residence halls for upperclassmen on campus. Off-campus there is an apartment complex and an residential hall. In addition, the university has activated four residential halls at DSU Downtown (the former Wesley College campus). The residential facilities include:

- Harriet Tubman-Lydia Laws Hall
- Meta V. Jenkins Hall
- Medgar Evers Hall
- Wynder Towers
- University Courtyard Apartments (off campus)
- University Village Complex
- Warren-Franklin Hall
- Carpenter Hall (DSU Downtown)
- Gooding Hall (DSU Downtown)
- Malmberg Hall (DSU Downtown)
- Zimmerman Hall (DSU Downtown)

Two dining halls serve the more than 1,500 on-campus students.

As a part of the Internet2 initiative, the university maintains several research computer laboratories including a high-performance computational cluster in its DESAC center. Almost every building has a computer lab and each student has a dedicated data port for internet access, their own phone, a campus email address, and cable television access in all residence hall rooms. Most campus buildings also offer wireless connectivity.

DSU is one of 148 schools in the country to receive Tree Campus USA recognition from the Arbor Day Foundation. The university owns two farms near Kenton and Smyrna, and has an Airway Science Program based at Delaware Air Park in Cheswold.

== Administration ==
Tony Allen became the 12th president of Delaware State University on January 1, 2020, after serving the previous two and a half years as the university's provost and executive vice president. Three months into his presidency, Allen ended in-person classes and residential operations on campus following the emergence of the COVID-19 pandemic, and the faculty began offering curriculum online. The university raised $1.5 million for a Student Emergency Relief Fund to address student needs brought on by COVID-19 crisis. Although the COVID-19 crisis continued throughout the year, Allen and the university reopened its residential halls for the fall semester 2020, allowing more than 1,700 students to resume their residency on campus while almost all classes continued to be held virtually.

The business and affairs of the university are governed by the board of trustees. The board of trustees has all the powers accorded it by Title 14, Chapter 65 of the Delaware Code. The board consists of 15 members whose appointment or election is provided for in the Delaware Code and the governor of the state and the president of the university who are ex officio members with voting rights.

=== Presidents ===
The following persons have served as president of Delaware State University:

No.	Image	President	Term start	Term end	Ref.
President of Delaware College for Colored Students (1891–1893)
1		Wesley P. Webb	1891	1895	
Presidents of the State College for Colored Students (1893–1947)
2		William C. Jason	1895	1923	
3		Richard S. Grossley	1923	1942	
4		Howard Gregg	1942	1949	
Presidents of Delaware State College (1947–1993)
acting		Maurice E. Thomasson	1949	1950	
5		Oscar J. Chapman	1950	1951	
acting		Maurice E. Thomasson	1951	1953	
6		Jerome H. Holland	July 1, 1953	1960 (Note: Resigned to lead the Hampton Institute.)	
7		Luna I. Mishoe	October 1960	June 30, 1987	
Presidents of Delaware State University (1993–present)
8		William B. DeLauder	July 1, 1987	June 30, 2003	
9		Allen L. Sessoms	July 1, 2003	August 31, 2008 (Note: Resigned to lead the University of the District of Columbia.)	
acting		Claibourne D. Smith	September 1, 2008	January 9, 2010	
10		Harry Lee Williams	January 10, 2010	December 31, 2017 (Note: Resigned to lead the Thurgood Marshall College Fund.)	
acting		Wilma Mishoe (Note: Daughter of president Luna Mishoe.)	January 2, 2018	June 30, 2018	
11		Wilma Mishoe	July 1, 2018	December 31, 2019	
12		Tony Allen	January 1, 2020	present	

Table notes:

== Academics ==
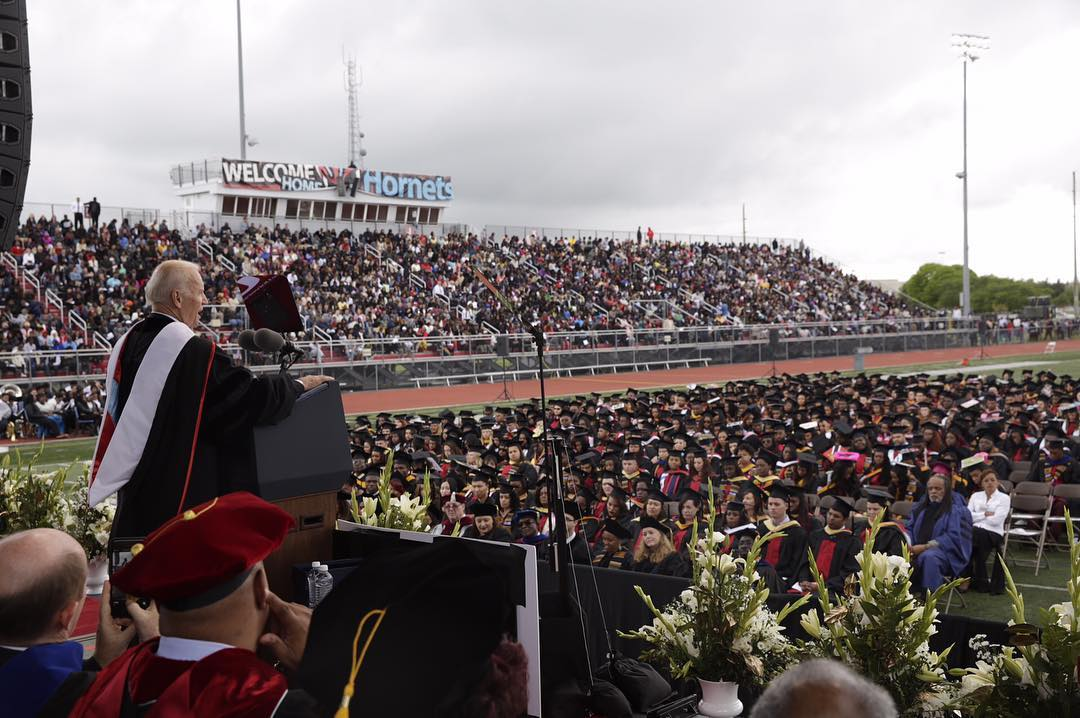
Then U.S. vice president Joe Biden delivering the commencement speech in May 2016

The university consists of four colleges:

- College of Agriculture, Science & Technology
- College of Humanities, Education & Social Sciences
- College of Business
- College of Health & Behavioral Sciences

DSU offers 46 undergraduate degrees, 21 graduate degrees, and six doctoral degrees (interdisciplinary applied mathematics and mathematical physics, applied chemistry, neuroscience and optics, integrative agriculture, food & environment, and educational leadership). The university also offers several cooperative and dual degree programs. Students receive instruction in classes with a 13:1 student-to-faculty ratio. About 80 percent of first-year undergraduates receive need-based financial aid. It has a traditional Honors Program and a Minority Access to Research Careers (MARC) Honors Program to increase the number of students in science interested in pursuing biomedical research and obtaining doctor of philosophy degrees in biology, chemistry, physics, mathematics, computer science, and biopsychology.

In addition to satisfying the requirements for the major or majors and any minor, all undergraduates are required to complete the General Education Program, which includes seven core courses, twelve foundation courses (across the curriculum), and the Senior Capstone Experience.

Accreditations include the Middle States Commission on Higher Education (MSCHE), the Accreditation Commission for Education in Nursing (ACEN), the Council on Social Work Education (CSWE), the Accreditation Council for Programs in Hospitality Administration (ACPHA), the National Council for Accreditation of Teacher Education (NCATE), and the Commission on Accreditation for Dietetic Education (CCDE). The university's College of Business is accredited nationally and internationally by the Association to Advance Collegiate Schools of Business (AACSB).

=== Aviation program ===
DSU's Aviation Program provides students with education and experience in preparation for careers in the aviation industry. Curricula in the program lead to a B.Sc. degree with concentrations in Aviation Management or Professional Pilot. Professional Pilot graduates will complete their Federal Aviation Administration (FAA) requirements for Private Pilot, Instrument, Commercial, Multi-Engine and Certified Flight Instructor ratings while earning their bachelor's degree.

Delaware State operates the only full-service, university-based flight school in the mid-Atlantic area. The Aviation program is approved by the State of Delaware Education Department for Veterans Flight Training.

=== Research ===
The institution has greatly increased its research endeavors over the past several years, as it has developed the research infrastructure needed to attract federal grants for projects in the following DSU Research Centers and in the sciences and mathematics:

- Applied Mathematics Research Center
- Center for Applied Optics
- Center for Research and Education in Optical Sciences and Applications (CREOSA) (a National Science Foundation-Center for Research Excellence (NSF-CREST))
- Center for Applied Optics for Space Science (CAOSS) (a National Aeronautics and Space Administration University Research Center (NASA-URC))
- Delaware Center for Scientific and Applied Computation

=== Rankings ===
Academic rankings

Regional
- U.S. News & World Report: 115 (north)

National
- Washington Monthly: 342

DSU is ranked 8th among the Historically Black Colleges and Universities in the U.S. News & World Report (2023).

In 2018, the College of Business at DSU was named to the Princeton Review's Best Business Schools for the tenth consecutive year (2009–2018).

=== Global connections ===
The university has over thirty formal international partnerships with institutions in countries including China, Cuba, Egypt, France, Italy, Japan, Korea, Mexico, Nigeria, Poland and the UK which facilitate research and conference collaborations as well as student exchanges.

== Student life ==
Undergraduate demographics as of fall 2023
Race and ethnicity	Total
Black	75%
Hispanic	8%
White	7%
Two or more races	6%
International student	2%
Asian	1%
Economic diversity
Low-income (Note: The percentage of students who received an income-based federal Pell grant intended for low-income students.)	48%
Affluent (Note: The percentage of students who are a part of the American middle class at the bare minimum.)	52%

=== Athletics ===
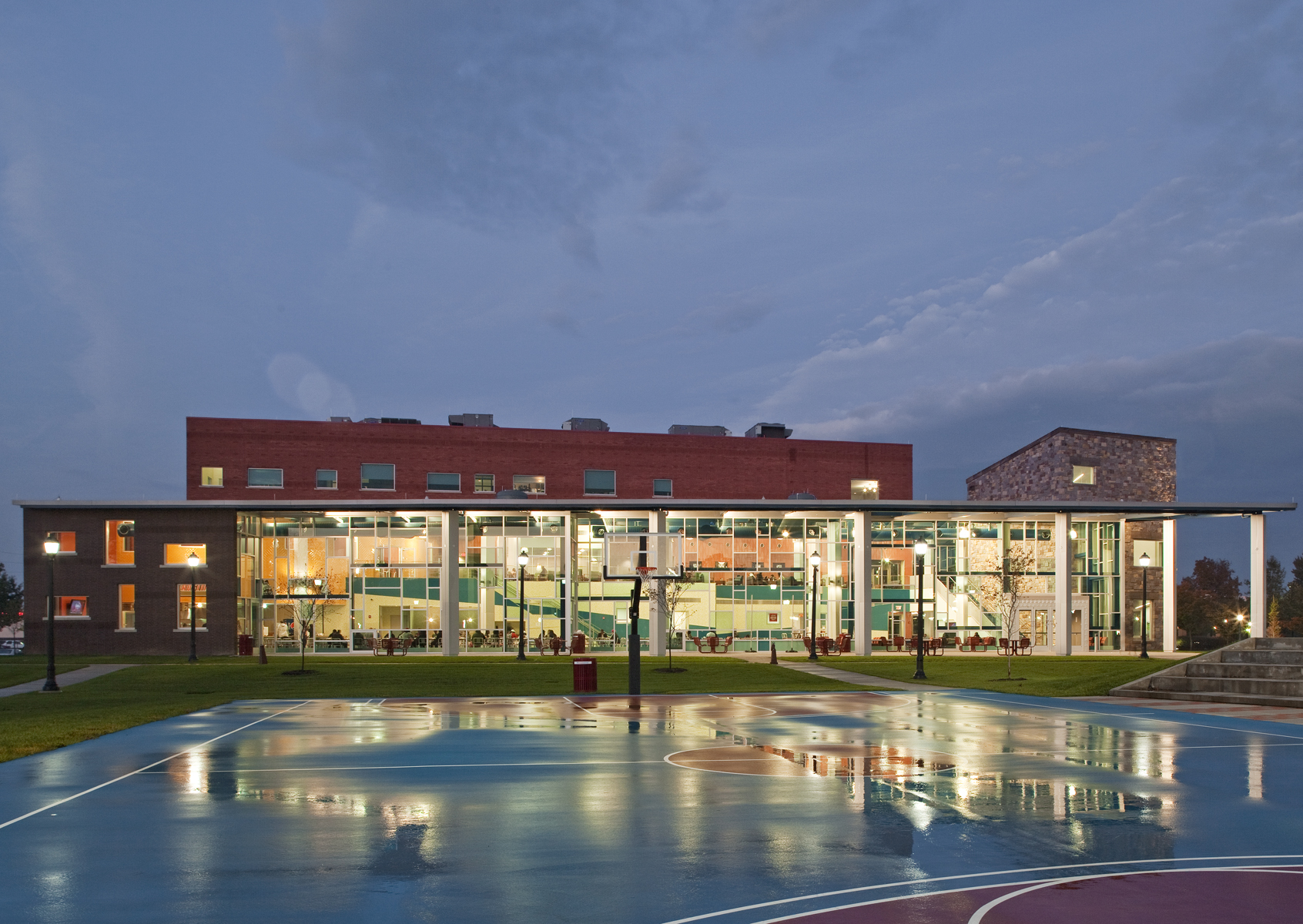
Delaware State University's Student Center

DSU athletic programs participate in the National Collegiate Athletic Association's (NCAA)'s Division I (FCS for football). The Hornets compete in the Mid-Eastern Athletic Conference as full members since the conference was founded in 1970.

The university's Department of Intramural Sports provides a wide variety of quality recreational programs for students, faculty and staff.

=== Student organizations ===
Delaware State has over 60 student organizations on campus including a Student Government Association (SGA), gospel choir, and The Approaching Storm Marching Band.

== Notable alumni ==
Name	Class year	Notability	Reference(s)
Reggie Barnes	1988	Canadian Football League running back, various teams, 1990–1996	
Clyde Bishop	1964	U.S. ambassador to the Marshall Islands, 2006–2009	
Clifford Brown		trumpet virtuoso, composer, influential and highly rated jazz musician	
Robin Christiansen		mayor of Dover since 2014, city councilman 1983–2001, and council president and vice mayor 1990–2001	
Emanual Davis	1991	former NBA player for the Atlanta Hawks and Seattle SuperSonics	
Wayne Gilchrest	1973	U.S. representative for Maryland's 1st congressional district, 1990–2009	
Jamaal Jackson	2003	National Football League offensive lineman, Philadelphia Eagles, 2003–2010	
Kailyn Lowry	2017	16 and Pregnant, Teen Mom 2	
Shaheer McBride	2008	National Football League wide receiver	
Darnerien McCants	2001	National Football League wide receiver	
Rod Milstead	1992	National Football League offensive lineman, Dallas Cowboys 1992, Cleveland Browns 1992–1993, San Francisco 49ers 1994–1997, Washington Redskins 1998–1999, Denver Broncos 2000	
LaToya Nkongolo	2000	Maryland General Assembly delegate for District 31, 2025-present	
Sam Shepherd	1975	represented Venezuela in basketball at the 1992 Summer Olympics	
SZA	2012	Grammy Award-winning R&B singer	
John Taylor	1986	National Football League wide receiver, San Francisco 49ers, 1987–1995	
Walter Tullis		National Football League wide receiver, Green Bay Packers	
