= Wilma Mishoe =

American academic administrator

11th President of Delaware State University
- In office January 1, 2018 – December 31, 2019; Interim: January 1, 2018 – June 30, 2018
- Preceded by: Harry L. Williams
- Succeeded by: Tony Allen

Personal details
- Born: Wilma Ann Mishoe; September 5, 1949 (age 75)
- Children: 2
- Parent: Luna Mishoe
- Education: Howard University; Temple University

Wilma Ann Mishoe (born September 5, 1949) is an American academic administrator who served as the eleventh president of Delaware State University from 2018 to 2019. She was the interim president of Wilberforce University in 2014.

== Life ==
Mishoe was born on September 5, 1949. She is the daughter of Hattie B. Dabney and mathematician and academic administrator Luna Mishoe. She began working in the dining hall at Delaware State University at the age of 14. Mishoe earned a B.S. (1971) in psychology and a master's degree in student personnel administration, guidance, and counseling at the Howard University. She completed an Ed.D. in adult/vocational education from Temple University. Her 1994 dissertation was titled, An Investigation of the Most Commonly Preferred Learning Styles of Learning Disabled Adult Students in Postsecondary Institutions Using the Myers-Briggs Type Indicator. Marvin Hirshfeld was her doctoral advisor.

Mishoe was an administrator at Wilmington College from 1975 to 1980. She retired from Delaware Technical Community College in 2010. She was a member of the Wilberforce University board of trustees for eleven years. When Patricia Hardaway resigned on December 31, 2013, she succeeded her as the interim president. In 2013, she was inducted into the Hall of Fame of Delaware Women. In June 2015, she joined the Delaware State University board of trustees. In August 2017, Mishoe became the first female chair of the Delaware State University board of trustees. On January 1, 2018, she succeeded Harry L. Williams as the interim president. She became the eleventh president on July 1, 2018. Mishoe is the first female to serve as the chief executive of the university. She retired on December 31, 2019, and was succeeded by Tony Allen.

Mishoe has two sons including Roy Sudler Jr., a Dover, Delaware city councillor.
