= Wilberforce University =

Historically black university in Wilberforce, Ohio, US

- Seal of Wilberforce University
- Motto: Suo Marte
- Motto in English: By one's own toil, effort, courage
- Type: Private historically black university
- Established: 1856; 170 years ago
- Religious affiliation: African Methodist Episcopal Church
- Academic affiliations: Space-grant
- President: Vann R. Newkirk, Sr.
- Students: 617
- Location: Wilberforce, Ohio, United States; 39°42′27″N 83°52′50″W
- Campus: Rural
- Colors: Green & Gold
- Nickname: Bulldogs
- Sporting affiliations: NAIA – HBCUAC
- Website: www.wilberforce.edu
- Carnegie Library (Old Wilberforce University Campus)
- U.S. National Register of Historic Places
- Location within Ohio Location within the United States
- Location: 1055 North Bickett Rd. Wilberforce, Ohio 45384
- Coordinates: 39°43′04″N 83°52′55″W
- Area: 0.5 acres (0.20 ha)
- Built: 1907
- Architect: David Riebel
- Architectural style: Classical Revival
- NRHP reference No.: 04000610
- Added to NRHP: June 16, 2004

Wilberforce University (WU) is a private university in Wilberforce, Ohio, United States. It is one of three historically black universities established before the American Civil War. Founded in 1856 by the Methodist Episcopal Church (MEC), it is named after English statesman and abolitionist William Wilberforce. In 1863, it was sold to the African Methodist Episcopal Church (AME), which had ties to the school since its inception. WU remains affiliated with the AME.

Beginning in 1887, WU operated as a partially state-funded and partially private institution. Concerns over the separation of church and state led WU's theology department to separate and establish the independent Payne Theological Seminary. The state-funded division of the school separated from WU in 1947 and became what is today known as Central State University.

The university currently offers twenty-five academic programs of undergraduate and graduate study. Since 1966, the school has emphasized cooperative education in which students do internships in their field of study in addition to their coursework. The school is a member of the National Association of Intercollegiate Athletics and its athletic teams, the Bulldogs, compete in the HBCU Athletic Conference.

== History ==
=== 19th century ===
==== Background ====
At the time Ohio became a state in 1802, it did so as a free state with the slave states of Kentucky and Virginia along its southern border. Ohio became a major thoroughfare for the Underground Railroad during the 19th century with an estimated 40,000 slaves escaping from the American South along Ohio routes. Additionally migratory patterns of free people of color in conjunction with the arrival of escaped slaves led to a significant growing black population across the state, but especially in Hamilton County, Ohio and those counties adjacent to it in Southwestern Ohio which had the largest and fastest growing black populations in Ohio in that era.

The need to educate the Ohio black community became a pressing issue of concern to community leaders, politicians, and religious groups. The Ohio Conference of the African Methodist Episcopal Church (AME Church) adopted education resolutions in 1833, and in the years following required their ministers to preach sermons on the need for education. The Ohio General Assembly formally mandated the establishment of public schools for Ohio's black population in 1854. Cincinnati High School opened that same year as the first public school for black students in Ohio. The Ohio Conference of the AME Church founded Union Seminary in West Jefferson, Ohio in 1847, but the school failed to thrive and closed in 1863.

In the years leading up to the American Civil War there was a growing movement to establish schools of higher learning for black people in the Northern United States as part of the abolitionist movement to end slavery. This was in stark contrast to the Southern United States where it was illegal for blacks to obtain an education. The first of these schools were Cheyney University of Pennsylvania (founded 1837) and Lincoln University in Pennsylvania (founded 1854). The interest in founding a similar school in Ohio was partly generated by a series of race riots in Southern Ohio that occurred in 1826, 1836, and 1841. The Cincinnati Conference of the Methodist Episcopal Church believed that the establishment of a university for blacks in Southwestern Ohio could do much to solve racial problems in the region, and were also wanting to provide opportunities to improve the lives of the approximately 50,000 black methodists living in the area overseen by the Cincinnati Conference.

==== Founding ====
Wilberforce University was the third historically black college (HBC) founded in the United States, and the last HBC established prior to the outbreak of the American Civil War. Some sources describe Wilberforce University as the oldest or first HBC because it was the first HBC to graduate students with an accredited bachelor's degree in 1857; an achievement not reached by another HBC until 1868 when Lincoln University awarded its first bachelor's diplomas.

Wilberforce University (WU) was officially incorporated in accordance with the laws of Greene County, Ohio on August 30, 1856. It was earlier established by a ratification of first the Cincinnati Conference of the Methodist Episcopal Church (MEC) on October 31, 1855 and later a vote of the MEC's national general assembly in May 22, 1856. The process of bringing this initiative to vote was done after a committee was founded on September 28, 1853 by the MEC to study founding a black college in consultation with the African Methodist Episcopal Church (AME Church). The school was established as a coeducation school of higher education for African-American students with its original name stylized as Wilberforce University. The use of the word university in the title was debated during the process of the school's founding, but ultimately it was decided that it should be used as an important aspirational gesture for what the founders hoped the school would become. They called this act a "pledge of victorious faith".

WU was named after the British abolitionist and statesman William Wilberforce; a name suggested by Uriah Heath at MEC's Cincinnati Conference which was officially adopted on August 26, 1856. Prior to this, the working title of the school during its development period was Ohio African University; a name adopted on May 22, 1856 that was permanently abandoned after the vote in August 1856. The MEC purchased 52 acres of land for $15,000 in what was then known as Tawawa Springs for the purposes of establishing the college. The word "Tawawa" came from the language of the Shawnee people, and translates into English as "bath of gold" in reference to the shining minerals found in the rocks in the streams on the property. It was described at that time as land 3 1/2 miles northeast of Xenia, Ohio.

The Tawawa Springs property already had buildings when in was purchased; including nine cottages available for student housing. The buildings had originally been built on the property for use as a pleasure resort. Because of its location, the Tawawa Springs attracted a summer crowd of people from both Cincinnati and the South, particularly after completion of the Little Miami Railroad in 1846. Some people in this area of abolitionist sentiment were shocked when wealthy white Southern planters patronized the resort with their entourages of enslaved African-American mistresses and mixed-race "natural" children. The former resort's hotel, an edifice which contained 200 rooms, was transformed into classroom space. The MEC spent $50,000.00 improving these buildings to make them usable for the new school.

==== Pre-Civil War years: 1856-1860 ====
Wilberforce University's first board was deliberately selected to represent more Christian faith backgrounds than just the MEC, with board members making up representation from a variety of Christian denominations. One of the school's original board members was abolitionist Salmon P. Chase who was then the 23rd governor of Ohio and later became Chief Justice of the United States. It was also a multi-racial board. Some of the other original 24 members of the board of trustees included Daniel A. Payne, Lewis Woodson, Ishmael Keith, and Alfred Anderson, all of the AME Church.

On September 16, 1856 the Reverend F. Merrick was elected president of Wilberforce University by the WU's board. Merrick, however, turned the position down, and the board was forced to look elsewhere. M. P. Gaddis Jr. served as principal of the school during its first year, and the school opened in October 1856 with a dedication ceremony presided over by Edward Thompson, then president of Ohio Wesleyan University. In February 1857 it was announced that Rev. John F. Wright was appointed the first president of Wilberforce University. However, minutes of WU board meetings indicate that there was an on-going active search committee for a WU president at the time Wright served in that post. Wright was the presiding elder of the East Cincinnati District and had spent two years lobbying the MEC Cincinnati Conference for the creation the school prior to the 1856 ratification. He had led the original 1854 committee and was the one responsible for negotiating the collaborative process with the AME Church with meetings that began in August 1855. He, along with M. French and A. Lowery, were responsible for negotiating the purchase of Tawawa Springs; a process which went through difficult deliberations with several rejected offers made in 1855 and 1856 before a successful one was made on May 22, 1856.

Wright served as the WU's president during its first academic year. His tenure as interim president was short, with Richard S. Rust of the MEC's New Hampshire Conference elected to the post of president on June 30, 1858. The new school faced pushback from the white community in Xenia with several Ohio newspapers running an identical article in 1858 which complained about the way life in Xenia had altered dramatically due to the influx of so many black individuals into what had been a predominantly white community. A formal petition was sent to the MEC Cincinnati Conference in 1858 requesting that the school be moved. This petition was crafted by the members of the MEC who lived in Xenia.

In its early years, WU had two programs of study, one was a college preparatory program which provided a high school education, and the other was a collegiate level education whose primary purpose was to train teachers. The student population of WU consisted of two types of students. One type, were students who were born to free people of color who hailed mainly from the free states of Ohio, Pennsylvania, and California. The other were multiracial children from the American South who were born on plantations to enslaved black women and were fathered by white slave holders. These white men wanted their enslaved mixed-race children to receive an education, and sent their children north to WU to obtain one. The fathers paid for the educations that were denied their children in the South. The university awarded its first diplomas in 1857, and by 1860 the private university had more than 200 students.

WU's faculty was predominantly white when it opened, and that continued to be the case until the late 1870s when a shift towards a predominantly black faculty occurred. It did however, embrace both men and women on the faculty since its inception with Gaddis and his wife splitting the teaching work load between them in the school's first year. They were succeeded by Mary J. Allen, and James K. Parker and his wife Maggie Baker. Most of the teaching staff in the early years of WU were graduates of Oberlin College or other northern schools which supported abolition. In 1859 Sarah Jane Woodson began to teach at Wilberforce. She was the first black American to teach at a historically black college or university (HBCU). She was a 1856 graduate of Oberlin College. She was the youngest sister of one of the original trustees, Lewis Woodson. After leaving the staff at the time of the school's temporary closure in 1862, she returned to Wilberforce in 1866 in a position of greater responsibility.

==== American Civil War: 1861-1865 ====
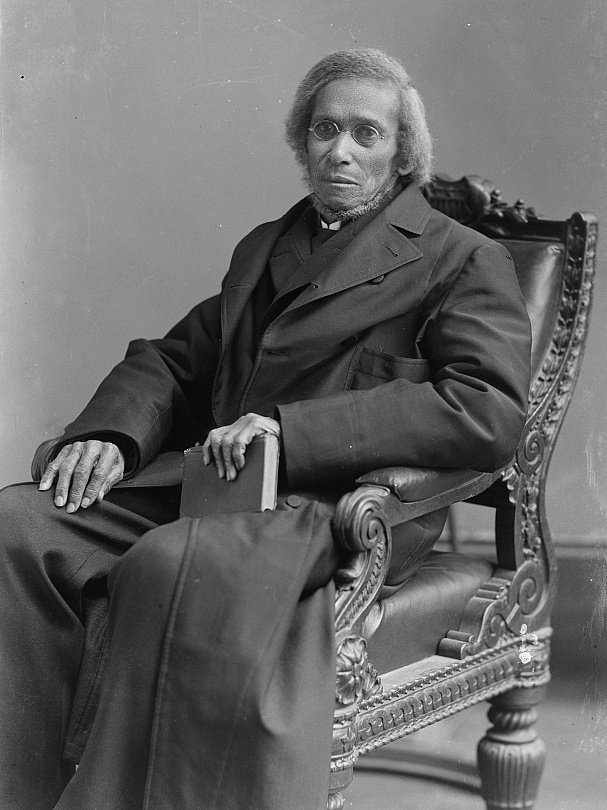
Daniel Alexander Payne in the early 1890s

The outbreak of the American Civil War threatened the college's finances. The school depended on the financial support of the Southern planters whose children attended the school. With the outbreak of the war, these men withdrew their children, and the school was unable to maintain enough funding to pay its staff. An emergency meeting of the WU board on June 19, 1862 led to the decision to suspend the school's operations, with a resolution to pay its staff what was possible, but not what had been promised. A further resolution was made to allow the school to reopen if a third party could step in and provide the means to operate the school, but no party ever materialized.

Ultimately a decision was made to formally close WU at a board meeting on March 10, 1863 with a committee appointed to oversee the selling of the school's assets. Bishop Daniel A. Payne of the AME Church was present at this meeting, and he made an offer for the AME Church to buy the school and all its assets from the MEC for $10,000; an offer which was ultimately accepted. Payne was associated with WU from the very beginning; serving on an executive committee appointed by the WU board from its inception and living with his family on WU's campus where two of his stepchildren were students. He was a graduate of Lutheran Theological Seminary at Gettysburg, and was occasionally left in charge of WU and its classes when its staff were engaged elsewhere.

In addition to paying for the school and its assets, the AME Church paid off WU's debts. The church sold another property to raise the funds to do this. The acquisition of WU by the AME Church was overseen by three individuals representing the AME Church. These men included Payne, James A. Shorter, pastor of the AME Church in Zanesville, Ohio and a future bishop; and John G. Mitchell, principal of the Eastern District Public School of Cincinnati. These men were responsible for securing the necessary financing to buy WU. A downpayment of $2,500.00 on the property was made and a contract signed on June 11, 1863; making the purchase final.

A new charter for the school was approved by a new board on June 10, 1863. Payne was selected as president for the newly reformed WU with Shorter as treasurer, and Mitchell appointed as the school's principal. The new school opened at the beginning of July 1863 with a small group of just six students. Enrollment grew, and by 1864 the school had classes taught by both Mitchell and his wife, Fannie A. Mitchell, and Esther Maltby, a teacher from the American Missionary Society who had graduated from Oberlin College. In 1865 the school was offering not only a traditional curriculum but also advanced classes in Greek, Latin, and mathematics. Students at the school at this time had limited career options open to them. Male students could pursue training as ministers to serve the AME church. Female students could train to work as teachers in a Christian education setting, as the school did not yet have licensing to graduate teachers who could teach in the public schools.

From the beginning, Payne's tenure was marked by a two-pronged approach to curriculum with one prong emphasizing religion and the other culture. Students were required to attend chapel services and religion classes twice daily. This practice was in place at WU until June 17, 1891 when the school board reduced the amount of religious instruction to only one chapel service daily. There were also two weekly prayer meetings on campus; one of which was compulsory for students.

==== Reconstruction era: 1865-1877 ====
In mid-April 1865, at the ending of the American Civil War, the students and faculty of WU attended a celebration of the fall of the Confederate States of America in Xenia, Ohio. While the school was left unattended, arsonists set fire to the main building of the school and it was destroyed. Valued at that time at $60,000.00, it was only insured for $8,000.00; making it a tremendous set back to the school whose finances were not abundant. The school was greatly hampered, as the main building not only housed all of its classroom space, but also contained its dining hall, large lecture hall, administrative space, and dormitory space for both male and female students.

WU, however, persevered after the fire and did not close; although many of its students withdrew after the fire. Classes were conducted from one of the cottage buildings by Miss Maltby for the remainder of the school year. She suffered a mental breakdown, and ultimately one of the advanced students at the school, J. P. Shorter, provided much of the school's education in the 1865-1866 academic year. Solid professional teaching staff was not stable again until the 1866-1867 academic year when Payne brought in three white teachers: William Kent from England to teach science, Suliot from Scotland to teach mathematics, Latin, and French, and the return of Sarah J. Woodson to teach English and Latin. Kent was a graduate of Oxford University and Suliot, a French-born Quaker, was a graduate of the University of Edinburgh.

Payne went to his network to appeal for aid in rebuilding the college; including support from the AME Church, private individuals, and charitable organizations. Large recurring annual donations were given to the school by the Society for the Promotion of Collegiate Theological Education and the American Unitarian Association. Additionally, Salmon P. Chase, then Chief Justice of the Supreme Court of the United States, and Charles Avery from Pittsburgh each contributed $10,000 to rebuild the college. Mary E. Monroe, another white supporter, contributed $4200. Other patrons during this period included Union Army general Oliver Otis Howard, United States Senator Charles Sumner of Massachusetts, and Reverend Theron Baldwin.

WU received its largest contribution at that point in the school's history as the result of an 1869-1870 campaign led by the Ohio General Assembly and Ohio's representatives to the United States Congress. Through this campaign the school was awarded a $28,000 grant from the Freedmen's Bureau for the purposes of educating teachers at WU. The funds raised through this grant and donations from patrons were enough to cover operational costs and build a new brick structure, Shorter Hall (completed 1878), to serve as the school's main building, but Payne was unsuccessful at obtaining additional funds to build an endowment as he had hoped.

The Reconstruction era history at WU also was marked by a period of academic improvements. The curriculum was systemized during this period, and courses in music, theology, and law were added to the prior coursework in the classics. Additionally, science offerings at the school were greatly expanded; including the addition of medical science instruction in 1867. Improvements were made to the courses preparing teachers for the classroom. Both theology and classics departments were established at the school in 1866. This was followed by a science department in 1867, and the establishment of a Normal school in 1872. With the establishment of this latter school, WU began to graduate black teachers who could work in public schools serving black children in the 1870s. The school's faculty remained largely white during the Reconstruction Era, and these teachers are credited with establishing a strong foundation in the school's newly created departments.

In 1876 Payne resigned from his post as president of WU. He was succeeded by Benjamin F. Lee who had previously graduated from Wilberforce in 1872, and then worked at Wilberforce as a professor of theology in addition to being employed as an AME church minister in Toledo. Payne continued to be a supporter of WU after he resigned; notably playing an instrumental role in establishing a small museum on the campus of WU in the 1880s.

==== Gilded Age: 1878-1890s ====
Financial instability continued to be an issue at WU during the Gilded Age. President Lee lacked both Payne's charisma and his social clout in wider American society within both black and white communities. As a result, he was an ineffective advocate and fund raiser for WU both within the AME Church and outside of it. While he implemented many fundraising plans, and made many appeals, he was not successful at raising money. As a result the staff made many financial sacrifices during his tenure, and they were owed backpay. However, Lee was successful at making several improvement's to the schools facilities during his tenure; including the outfitting of the Ware Art Room and the furnishing of the school's music rooms. The latter project was paid for by donations made by the Mother Bethel A.M.E. Church in Philadelphia.

One of Lee's fundraising initiatives was the establishment of a touring school choir known as the Wilberforce Concert Company in 1881. Fisk University, another historically black university, founded the Fisk Jubilee Singers in 1871 which had proven to be a successful fund raising tool for that university. The success of this choir led to the formation of touring choirs at other historically black schools, many of which successfully raised enough funds to keep these schools operating, including the Hampton Singers at Hampton University. Lee's Wilberforce Concert Company failed to bring in much financial support but gained a reputation for musicianship and drew students from a wider geographic area to Wilberforce, leading to diversification of the student body. The choir toured until it was disbanded in 1887.

Lee's tenure was also marked by a period of faculty instability. The strict moral code of ethics placed on teachers, low play, and the heavy work load demands placed on the faculty were some factors contributing to teacher turnover. In an interview, Mary Church Terrell, who taught at WU in the 1880s, said that the work load was overwhelming. She was simultaneously responsible for teaching courses in French, English, mineralogy, and music. On top of this she conducted the school's choir and played organ for the school's chapel services. Additionally, president Lee had many personal conflicts with his teaching staff which led to several staff members resigning in protest. One of these was Mrs. S. C. Bierce who was the head of the normal school department at WU. Bierce was the wife of the prominent classics scholar William Sanders Scarborough whom Lee had successfully wooed to WU and was one the school's most prominent academics. Despite pleas from the school board to find a way to convince Bierce to return, she refused and did not return to WU until after the end of Lee's tenure as president.

In 1884 Lee left WU to become the editor of The Christian Recorder. Samuel T. Mitchell, an 1873 graduate of Wilberforce, replaced Lee as WU's president; a role he remained in through 1900. Like his predecessor, Mitchell's presidency was marked by a period of repeating financial crises which was exacerbated in his tenure by the deaths of aging past donors. Additionally, both government and charitable funds that were available to the school during the Reconstruction Era had either disappeared completely or significantly diminished. Unlike his predecessor, Mitchell was a far better communicator and charismatic public speaker, and was more successful in building relationships with new donors.

Mitchell was a visionary who recognized the need to secure state funding for Wilberforce in order to end the cycle of repeating financial crises. Politically savvy, he was aware that Wilberforce would need an advocate in the Ohio General Assembly (OGA) in order to make that goal a reality. He therefore became heavily involved in the successful campaign to elect Benjamin W. Arnett to the OGA. Additionally, Mitchell led a campaign mounted from within Wilberforce that included faculty members and other administrators to advocate for a state-financed department at WU. This campaign successfully lobbied white politicians from both the Democrat and Republican parties.

Arnett became a powerful figure in Republican Party politics in Ohio, and he was responsible for shepherding a bill through the Ohio legislature in 1886-1887 that would provide state funding for a department at WU. On March 19, 1887 the "Combined Normal and Industrial Department at Wilberforce University" (CNI) was created with bipartisan support by the passage of a law by the Ohio General Assembly. In accordance with political needs of the era, this new department emphasized both teacher training and industrial education in addition to classical education. The department was a part of WU, but was also apart from the institution. The board that oversaw WU was not given authority over this department. A separate board was appointed over CNI with the governor of Ohio empowered by the Ohio legislature to appoint 5 members of its 9 member board. The AME Church could appoint the other four members, but that meant it had a minority vote on the board.

The newly formed state partnership with WU created complications for administration and questions about the mission of the college. In the near term it brought tens of thousands of dollars annually in state aid to the campus. Each state legislator could award an annual scholarship to the CNI department at Wilberforce, enabling hundreds of African-American students to attend classes. The state-funded students could complete liberal arts at the college, and students at Wilberforce could also take "industrial" classes. The AME church and the theology department at WU were concerned about the implications of government influence within the school, and recommended that a clearly separated seminary be established that was independent from WU. WU's board of trustees accepted this recommendation, and a move was made to establish Payne Theological Seminary (PTS). The seminary began teaching students in June 1891 on the campus of Wilberforce. A separate campus was dedicated on September 20, 1892, and the seminary was officially incorporated as a separate institution on June 19, 1894. It however, maintained some formal administrative connections with WU and was only semi-independent; with WU's president still technically over the school while not having much power over it.

In 1890 WU's first dormitory for women, O'Neill Hall, was completed, and in 1895 an industrial building was finished on campus. In 1894 United States president Grover Cleveland charged John Hanks Alexander, a West Point graduate, with establishing a school of military training at WU. From this point on military tactics and other related topics was part of WU's curriculum. Lieutenant Charles Young, the third black graduate of West Point, taught the school's classes in military science within this department.

WU's student body in the 1870s and 1880s included many students from Haiti. By the mid-1890s, the college also admitted students from South Africa, as part of the AME Church's mission to Africa. Such students received scholarships and boarded with local families. In the 1890s enrollment increased to include students from South America, Canada, Mexico, the British West Indies, and Bermuda. An 1898 report published by the AME Church listed the university as having 20 faculty, 334 students, and 246 graduates.

The college became a center of black cultural and intellectual life in southwestern Ohio. Xenia and nearby towns developed a professional black elite. Prominent faculty members at Wilberforce in this era included W. E. B. Du Bois, the philologist and William S. Scarborough.

=== 20th century ===
==== Progressive Era and World War I: 1900-1929 ====
===== President Joshua Henry Jones =====
The Progressive Era marked a period of significant expansion at WU in terms of not only the curriculum but also the physical campus, and the size of both the student body and faculty. Bachelor programs were mainly housed at this time within the College of Liberal of Arts (CLA) and technical trade degrees within the state-funded Combined Normal and Industrial Department (CNI). In 1900 the CNI department offered multiple courses; including a normal school for teacher training, a commercial school for business, secretarial training, carpentry, sewing, printing, music, cooking, printing, shoemaking, and drawing. Most student in the CNI department in this era earned both a four year normal school degree and one of the technical degrees. Over the first decade of the 20th century the CNI department added additional courses in millinery, applied mechanics, blacksmithing, plumbing, and tailoring.

Joshua Henry Jones served as president of WU from 1900–1908. An 1887 graduate of WU who had achieved significant personal wealth as a businessman, he used university funds to purchase multiple farms that would provide income to the school. During his tenure, Howells Hall, a building to house the department of printing, was completed in 1900. A second women's dormitory, Arnett Hall, was completed in 1905, and in 1906 Galloway Hall opened on campus. This latter building contained a large auditorium for the school as well as serving as a trades building. Also completed in 1906 was Poindexter Hall which originally served as classroom space for both carpentry and drawing. Andrew Carnegie provided the funds to construct a library on campus which was built in 1906-1907, and was officially dedicated in June 1907.

While popular with both faculty and students during his tenure, president Jones was not well liked by WU's board of trustees. He attempted unsuccessfully to consolidate administrative power over WU's three schools: the CLA, the CNI, and Payne Theological Seminary (PTS). While technically the office of president was over all three schools, in reality the president had little administrative power over the state funded CNI or over the independent PTS. His ambition at power consolidation along with internal politics with the AME church ultimately led to his dismissal in June 1908.

Jones hired Theophilus Gould Steward, a politician, theologian and missionary, to join WU's faculty in 1907. He was a leading scholar at the university in the early 20th century and was prominent in the American Negro Academy, founded in 1897 to support the work of scholars, writers and other intellectuals.

===== President William Sanders Scarborough =====
WU classics professor William Sanders Scarborough succeeded Jones as president; serving in that role until 1920. Scarborough had been a teacher at WU for 31 years prior to his appointment as president in 1908, and was a well known and respected scholar of Greek and Latin outside of WU. His public standing as a lauded scholar provided him with many connections within wider academia, and he was an active member in many scholarly and learned societies. These connection provided him with greater access to philanthropic organizations and individuals than WU's previous presidents. He was able to successfully leverage his connections to bring in substantial donations and grants, and was effective at public relations for WU. While he was not able to completely pay off the university's debts, he did reduce the debt to $25,000 while simultaneously overseeing a period of expansion at the university.

Under Scarborough, the faculty at WU doubled in size, and student enrollment increased from 400 students to 1542 students. The curriculum underwent significant revisions to meet the standards set for universities by the Carnegie Foundation, and a financial accounting system was instituted. Additionally a concerted effort was made by CNI superintendent W. A. Joiner to weaken the technical trade programs while increasing the quality and prominence given to the normal school. In 1914 many of the industrial education staff of the CNI were laid off and their departments abolished. Later attempts to restore vocational education at WU all failed. In 1915 the CLA began offering both bachelor of arts and bachelor of science degrees in education. In 1916 the college preparatory division of the CLA was completely separated into a separate Academy, and the college professors were no longer teachers in this division. By 1918 the CLA was offering combined courses of study in arts-law, arts-journalism, pre-dentistry, pre-medicine, science-medicine, arts-medicine, arts-pharmacy, arts-agriculture, arts-engineering, and arts-home economics.

In 1910 a third women's dormitory, Mitchell Hall, was constructed. Scarborough was also able to raise the funds to build another women's dormitory, Kezia Emery Hall. It was constructed in 1913 using predominantly funds provided by Miss E. J. Emery and Andrew Carnegie; and was named for Emery's mother. The state funded CNI built Tawawa Hospital on campus in 1916 which served the medical needs of WU students in addition to providing space for training in nursing to CNI students. CNI also built Bundy Hall to relieve dormitory over crowding and provide administrative space for the CNI department. It was completed in 1917 along with the new Mechanics Art Building which housed CNI training classrooms for blacksmiths, auto-mechanics, and other technical trades.

WU's military department and prior existing relationship with the United States Army led the school to become a leader among universities in providing aid to the United States government during World War I. Shortly after the American entry into the war, the faculty of WU voted to offer the university and its resources to the US government. President Woodrow Wilson and Ohio governor James M. Cox personally thanked the institution for their offer, and WU rapidly became active in the war effort in multiple ways. President Scarborough was appointed a food commissioner in the service of the United States Food Administration, and was an Ohio representative to the Council of National Defense.

Many of WU's male students and at least six professors enlisted in the American armed forces and were sent to train at facilities like Camp Stanley, Camp Pike, Camp Hancock, Camp Leach, and Camp Gordon. A large percentage of them became officers with ranks of either captain, sergeant, or lieutenant. Additionally, an Army Training Corp was established on WU's campus in 1918 with the university taking on the responsibility of housing and feeding the 400 soldiers stationed at the camp. The WU community also were involved in supporting initiatives of the American Red Cross, and the selling of liberty bonds and war saving stamps.

===== President John Andrews Gregg =====
In spite of his success, Scarborough had an acrimonious relationship with Bishop Jones, the head of WU's executive board. His retirement in 1920 was largely due to internal politics with Bishop Jones attempting to have his son, Gilbert H. Jones, supplant Scarborough as president. That coup failed, and John Andrews Gregg, then president of Edward Waters College, was elected to succeed Scarborough.

Gregg paid off all of WU's debt in the Fall of 1920 when the school hosted the "Victory Rally of 1920". Student enrollment was at an all time high in the post-World War I era, and the university was struggling to find adequate housing both on and off campus. Additionally United States Army soldiers who served in Europe during the war were being sent to the school to be rehabilitated; further increasing the crowded population on campus. The housing shortfall was further compounded when Shorter Hall burned to the ground on December 7, 1922; displacing two hundred male students. In order to meet the worsening housing crises, Shorter Hall was rebuilt in a greatly expanded capacity and adjacent properties such as the Tawawa Hotel and the Griffin House were purchased, renovated, and expanded into dormitory spaces. Griffin House also included an assembly hall, a barber shop, a tailor shop, and a heating plant in addition to 71 dorm rooms. By the 1923-1924 school year the campus was able to house approximately 1000 students.

Gregg also made a concerted effort to improve WU's academic standing. In 1916 a United States Bureau of Education survey made in cooperation with the Phelps Stokes Fund had given the university a middling rating which had negatively impacted its student's abilities in obtaining entry into competitive graduate school programs elsewhere. In response to this report, Gregg worked to standardize the curriculum with the goal of obtaining accreditation from the North Central Association of Colleges and Schools (NCACS). Through his efforts, the school successfully became a member of the Association of American Colleges in 1924, but still lacked an NCACS accreditation.

In 1920 the CNI greatly expanded its teacher-training courses to include pedagogy for household arts, industrial arts, business, agriculture, and printing as well as offering more courses in the normal school.

===== President Gilbert H. Jones =====
In May 1924 Gregg was appointed a bishop of the AME Church and he resigned from his position as president. He was succeeded by WU's dean of the College of Liberal Arts, Gilbert H. Jones, who was also an alumnus of WU and son of WU's former president, Joshua Henry Jones. Gilbert Jones was also a scholar who had earned a doctorate from the University of Jena in Germany; an achievement uncommon at that time among black academics. Joshua Jones was elected president of WU's executive board during his son's presidency, and the father and son team were the major leaders of the university into the early 1930s.

Jones made several attempts to continue the work towards NCACS accreditation that Gregg had begun, but the financial debt incurred from rebuilding Shorter Hall proved to be a major hurdle to the school. Several ill-fated fund raising attempts were made in the late 1920s, and the funds necessary to do the work to reach accreditation were never raised. In 1927 WU began an initiative to improve faculty competence. They gave sabbaticals to a group of faculty so that they could obtain master degrees in their areas of instruction, and other faculty were provided support in taking additional graduate training in the summers or through extension courses. Ultimately nine faculty earned master degrees that year, and forty-eight of the seventy-two faculty participated in some form of furthering education. This initiative continued at the school into the 1930s.

In 1926 a building to house the WU's laundry facilities was completed, and in 1927 a new power plant was completed on campus.

==== Great Depression: 1930-1939 ====
In 1930 the CLA's bachelor of education programs were merged into the education program at CNI, and the school's curricular offerings overhauled. Degrees in social administration, library science, and journalism were added to the offerings within CLA at this time, and many of the prior combined degrees were abandoned. Simultaneously, CNI added four year degrees in home economics, commerce, and agriculture; taking over some of the curricular areas previously housed within CLA. CNI also offered the full range of elementary and secondary education programs at bachelor degree level then accredited in the state of Ohio. The only vocational program holdovers still available at the school were four year degrees in agriculture and commerce, and individual unit courses in the industrial branch of the department.

In June 1932 Charles H. Wesley was elected to replace Gilbert H. Jones as president. However, a month into his presidency he resigned for personal reasons. He would later serve as WU's president during World War II. Ultimately sociologist Richard R. Wright, Jr., the first African American to earn a PhD from the University of Pennsylvania, was appointed president in September 1932. Wright was the longtime editor of The Christian Recorder and an AME Church pastor in Philadelphia who had little previous experience as an educator or administrator. He had previously worked in education as an instructor in Hebrew at Payne Theological Seminary for the 1902-1903 academic year.

Like his predecessors, Wesley was occupied with the problem of accreditation. In 1934 Arthur J. Klein led a team of educators from Ohio State University and Muskingum College to survey the college and identify places for improvement. Curriculum and faculty committees were also established with WU to review the issue. The results of the institutional study led to structural and curriculum changes as well as a reworking of the school's financial and accounting structure in line with requirements of NCACS. In 1935 the school underwent inspection by NCACS, but failed to pass due to issues identified with the schools laboratories, library, and administrative structure.

In order to remedy the problems of the NCACS review, WU's Carnegie Library underwent a renovation and expansion in 1935-1936. Wesley left his post as president in June 1936, and he was succeeded by D. Ormonde Walker. Wesley's close advisor, Bland L. Stradley, proposed structural changes to the administration and curricular design in 1937, but most of these measures were not adopted by the school's boards. In 1938 WU made a bid to be accredited by the Ohio College Association, but was rejected.

In 1939, WU was finally given a provisional accreditation by NCACS. That same year the Ohio General Assembly passed the Gillespie Bill which significantly reduced the number of board seats the AME Church had on the CNI's board, and increased the number of seats appointed by the governor of Ohio. This was done in response to growing concerns that the AME Church wielded too much sectarian influence over CNI. It also reflected an on-going state of friction between the CNI department and its state appointed board with the WU administration and the AME church appointed board which oversaw the rest of the college.

==== World War II and split from College of Education and Industrial Arts: 1939-1947 ====
On May 13, 1941 the CNI's name was officially changed to the College of Education and Industrial Arts at Wilberforce University (CEIA). The name change was done in part to more clearly separate the department from the rest of WU. The CEIA continued to be governed by a board appointed by the Governor of Ohio, and the World War II era at WU was marked by an increasing amount of tension between this board and the AME church backed board which oversaw the CLA. Despite the administrative tensions, the 1940s marked a period of continued growth at WU, to the point that a record enrollment in 1946 of 1,480 students was deemed "overcrowded".

In 1942 the school's NCACS accreditation was threatened if the school did not improve its administration. Charles H. Wesley was persuaded to return to WU to meet this crises, and he assumed the office of president June 1942. In the first two years of his leadership, WU was able to bring pay equality for the first time for all of the faculty; ending a pay disparity between the state funded CEIA staff and the AME Church funded CLA staff. He also significantly increased the number of tenured faculty, and was able to first stabilize and then expand WU's accreditation status; ultimately achieving accretions from twelve different education organizations. WU's improved standing under Wesley led to the school's acceptance into the Inter-University Council of Ohio in 1944.

With Wesley's guidance a self-governed student council was established in June 1943. That same year Wesley obtained a million dollar grant for WU from the government Ohio which enabled the school to renovate many of its buildings, including the cafeteria and water supply unit. Other changes he made at WU included moving from a semester format to a quarter system, and establishing a graduate school of education which offered master's degrees. A summer school at WU was added for the purpose of offering courses to teachers wishing to pursue graduate studies.

Wesley had amiable relations with both WU's AME Church backed board and its government appointed state board during the first two years of his presidency. This changed in August 1944 when a group of AME Church bishops decided they wanted to replace him with WU's former president D. Ormonde Walker. A vote of the AME backed board approved this decision under Wesley's protest. Walker had originally agreed to return as president, but was unaware of the politics of the situation. When Walker learned about Wesley's objections, he contacted WU's board and told them he would no longer accept the offer.

Wesley remained as president, but his relationship the AME backed board had soured. His attempted firing by the AME board alarmed Ohio's politicians, and Senate Bill 293 was drafted in 1945 in the Ohio legislature in response to events of 1944. This proposed bill placed the hiring and firing of WU's president solely under the control of the board appointed by the governor of Ohio and eliminated the AME Church's control over that post. The bill became a contentious issue in the media; with papers taking sides with either the AME Church or the government of Ohio. Some paper's accused Wesley of courting political patronage and accused the state of Ohio of trying to arrest control of WU.

An attempt was made to smooth over the administrative tensions and end the power play by forming a Joint Executive Committee (JEC) that would oversee matters that were shared by the CLA and CEIA. This attempt ultimately failed when the AME backed board decided to unilaterally fire Wesley on June 9, 1947. The consequences of this act led to the state-backed WU board to vote that the AME board had enacted a "breach of agreement", and the state-backed WU board filed an injunction in the courts to prevent Wesley's dismissal. A series of court proceedings followed, which ultimately upheld the firing of Wesley but also led to the state legally being allowed to remove the CEIA from WU and create its own separate institution at Wilberforce.

On September 9, 1947 the CEIA officially separated from WU and became its own college titled the "College of Education and Industrial Arts at Wilberforce, Greene County, Ohio". The official name was not often used in common speech, and the school colloquially was referred to as the State College of Education or Wilberforce State College. Wesley was appointed this school's first president, and remained in that post for two decades. It was renamed as Central State College in 1951. With further development of programs and departments, in 1965 it achieved university status as Central State University.

==== Post-War era and construction of new campus in the 1960s ====
Growth of Wilberforce University after the mid-20th century led to construction of a new campus in 1967, located one mile (1.6 km) away. In 1974, the area was devastated by an F5 tornado that was part of the 1974 Super Outbreak, which destroyed much of the city of Xenia and the old campus of Wilberforce.

Older campus buildings still in use include the Carnegie Library, built in 1909 with matching funds from the Carnegie Foundation, and listed on the National Register of Historic Places; Shorter Hall, built in 1922; and the Charles Leander Hill Gymnasium, built in 1958. The former residence of Charles Young near Wilberforce was designated as a National Historic Landmark by the US Department of Interior, in recognition of his significant and groundbreaking career in the US Army.

==== Late 20th century: 1970s-1990s ====
In the 1970s, the university established the National Afro-American Museum and Cultural Center, to provide exhibits and outreach to the region. It is now operated by the Ohio Historical Society. The university also supports the national Association of African American Museums, to provide support and professional guidance especially to smaller museums across the country.

=== 21st century ===
In 2008, the US Department of Education, Office of the Inspector General (OIG) completed an audit of financial management, specifically the university's management of Title IV funds, which related to its work-study program. For the two-year audit period (2004–2005, 2005–2006) the audit found numerous faults. In summary, the OIG found that the university did not comply with Title IV, HEA requirements because of administrative problems, including staff turnover, insufficient financial aid staff, failure to have written procedures, and lack of communication with other offices. The university worked with auditors to set up appropriate staff and procedures.

In 2021, the university announced it was cutting tuition by 15% for Ohio residents.

=== Presidents ===
- John F. Wright, interim president, appointed 1857
- Richard Rust, 1858–1862, first elected president
- Daniel A. Payne, 1863–1876, first president of the college under AME operation
- Benjamin F. Lee, 1876–1884
- Samuel T. Mitchell, 1884–1900
- Joshua H. Jones, 1900–1908
- William S. Scarborough, 1908–1920
- John A. Gregg, 1920–1924
- Gilbert H. Jones, 1924–1932
- Richard R. Wright, Jr., 1932–1936, 1941–1942
- D. Ormonde Walker, 1936–1941
- Charles H. Wesley, 1942–1947
- Charles Leander Hill, 1947–1956
- Rembert E. Stokes, 1956–1976
- Charles E. Taylor, 1976–1984
- Yvonne Walker Taylor, 1984–1988
- John L. Henderson, 1988–2002
- Floyd Flake, 2002–2008
- Patricia Hardaway, 2009–2013,
- Wilma Mishoe, 2014, interim president
- Algeania Marie Warren Freeman, 2014–2016
- Herman J. Felton, Jr., 2016–2018
- Elfred Anthony Pinkard, 2018–2023
- Vann R. Newkirk, Sr., 2023–present

== Academics ==
According to US News and World Report, Wilberforce had a 29% four-year graduation rate in 2024.

Wilberforce requires most students to participate in cooperative education. The cooperative program places students in internships that provide practical work experience in addition to academic training. It has been a part of the curriculum at Wilberforce since 1966.

== Athletics ==
The Wilberforce athletic teams are called the Bulldogs. The university is a member of the National Association of Intercollegiate Athletics (NAIA), primarily competing as a member of the HBCU Athletic Conference since the 2024-2025 academic year. They previously competed as an NAIA Independent within the Continental Athletic Conference during the 2023–24 academic year; which they were a member on a previous stint from 2012–13 to 2021–22. The Bulldogs competed in the Mid-South Conference (MSC) during the 2022–23 school year, and in the defunct American Mideast Conference from 1999–2000 to 2011–12.

Men's sports include baseball, basketball, cross country, golf and track & field (indoor and outdoor); while women's sports include basketball, cross country, gymnastics, golf, volleyball, and track & field (indoor and outdoor).

=== Intramurals ===
Students also participate in the following intramural sports: basketball, softball, volleyball, flag football, and tennis.

== Notable alumni ==
Name	Class year	Notability	Reference(s)
Victoria Gray Adams		Pioneering civil rights activist	
Regina M. Anderson		Playwright, librarian, and member of the Harlem Renaissance	
Benjamin F. Bowles	1905	University president and founder	
Myron "Tiny" Bradshaw		Jazz and rhythm and blues bandleader, singer, pianist, and drummer	
Hallie Quinn Brown	1873	Educator, writer and activist	
Shontel Brown	2022	Congresswoman	
Isaac M. Burgan		president of Paul Quinn College 1883-1891, 1911-1914	
Richard H. Cain		Minister, abolitionist, and United States Representative from South Carolina from 1873–1875 and 1877-1879	
Floy Clements		First African-American woman to serve in the Illinois House of Representatives (1959-1960)	
William B. Derrick	1885	Minister, AME bishop	
Charity Adams Earley		First female African-American officer in the Women's Army Auxiliary Corps; commanding officer of the first battalion of African American women to serve overseas during WWII	
Nina Gomer Du Bois		Civil rights activist and Baháʼí faith activist, wife of W.E.B. Du Bois	
Wade Ellis	1928	Twelfth African-American to earn a Ph.D. in mathematics (University of Michigan, 1944). First African-American faculty member at Oberlin College. Former associate dean of graduate studies at the University of Michigan.	
Mary G. Evans	1924	Pastor at Cosmopolitan Community Church in Chicago from 1932 to 1966. First woman to graduate with a Doctor of Divinity from Wilberforce University.	
Floyd H. Flake		U.S. Congressman, Wilberforce President	
Frank Foster		Musician; member of the Count Basie Orchestra	
John R. Fox		Recipient of the Medal of Honor	
Raymond V. Haysbert		Business executive and civil rights leader	
Leon Quincy Jackson		American architect, professor at Tennessee State University, and an early African American architect in Oklahoma and Tennessee; he did not graduate from Wilberforce University but took classes	
Leon Jordan	1932	Politician and civil rights activist; considered one of the most influential African Americans in the history of Kansas City, Missouri	
Orchid I. Jordan		served in the Missouri House of Representatives from 1970 to 1984	
Florence LeSueur		The first female NAACP president in 1949, civil right leader and activist.	
James H. McGee		City commissioner and first African American mayor of Dayton, Ohio	
Arnett "Ace" Mumford	1924	Former college football coach at Southern University from 1936 to 1961. He also coached at Jarvis Christian College, Bishop College, Texas College; member of College Football Hall of Fame	
Demetrius Newton		Civil rights attorney	
Bill Powell		Owner and designer of Clearview Golf Club, the first integrated golf course in America and the first owned and designed by an African American	
Leontyne Price		Opera singer and first African American prima donna of the Metropolitan Opera	
Henry Richardson	1943	First African American state legislator in New Hampshire	
George Russell		Jazz composer and theorist	
Green Pinckney Russell	1913	American school administrator, college president, and teacher	
Jimmy Rushing		Blues musician	
Bayard Rustin		Labor leader, civil rights organizer	
Susie Lankford Shorter		writer, educator	
William Grant Still		Composer and conductor; the first African American to conduct a major American orchestra, the first to have a symphony performed by a leading orchestra, and the first to have an opera performed by a major opera company	
Ossian Sweet		African-American doctor notable for self-defense in 1925 against a white mob's attempt to force him out of his Detroit neighborhood, and acquittal at trial	
Dorothy Vaughan	1929	American mathematician whose work at the National Advisory Committee for Aeronautics (NACA), predecessor agency to NASA; inspired the 2016 biographical drama film Hidden Figures	
Ben Webster		American jazz musician	
Milton Wright	1926	Economist	

== See also ==
- Historically black colleges and universities
- 1931 Wilberforce Green Wave football team

== Representation in other media ==
- Dolen Perkins-Valdez's novel Wench (2010) explores the lives of several enslaved women of color brought to the Tawawa House resort during the summers by their Southern white masters. They were among the visitors in the years before the property was bought for use as the college.
