= Tony Allen (academic administrator) =

American academic administrator

12th President of Delaware State University
- Incumbent
- Assumed office 2020
- Preceded by: Wilma Mishoe

Personal details
- Children: 4
- Education: University of Delaware; Baruch College

Tony Allen is an American academic administrator working as the president of the Delaware State University since 2020.

== Early life and education ==
Allen was born to R. Leatha Allen. He moved to Delaware at the age of 3. Allen completed an undergraduate degree in political science at the University of Delaware. In March 1991, he was one of 200 black student activists who participated in a sit-in at Smith Hall.

Allen obtained a Bachelor of Arts degree in political science in 1993 and a Ph.D. in urban affairs & public policy from the University of Delaware, as well as a Master of Public Administration from Baruch College at the City University of New York.

== Career ==
After graduating from college, Allen worked for the Wilmington cluster against substance abuse at the Edgemoor community center. In March 1994, he joined the Wilmington chapter of Public Allies. A year later, Allen succeeded Suzanne Sysko as the executive director. At this time, he was 25 and oversaw the nonprofit organization's $300,000 annual budget.

In 1996, Allen became the first national urban fellow from Delaware. During this time, he worked a special assistant at the William Penn Foundation where he created financial forecasts of the Philadelphia family centers program. He took courses in public administration at Baruch College and was valedictorian of his national urban fellow class.

Allen oversaw public education reform initiatives for the Delaware school system.

Allen was the managing director of corporate reputation at the Bank of America. He cofounded the nonprofit organization, the Metropolitan Wilmington Urban League.

In July 2017, Allen became the provost and executive vice president of the Delaware State University. He became president in 2020. In 2021, he was appointed by U.S. president Joe Biden as the chair to the president's board of advisors on historically black colleges and universities.

== Personal life ==
Allen is the father of four children with his life partner Tara Anderson, who has been described as "his high school sweetheart".

In August 2025, Allen was charged with driving under the influence after being pulled over on July 21.
