= Martin University =

Private university in Indianapolis, Indiana, US

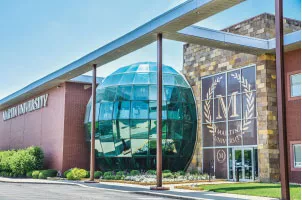
- Type: Private college
- Active: 1977–2025
- Founder: Boniface Hardin
- Students: 223 (as of 2023)
- Location: 2186 N. Sherman Dr., Indianapolis, Indiana, United States; 39.799°N 86.104°W
- Website: www.martin.edu

Martin University (originally Martin Center College) was a private college in Indianapolis, Indiana, United States. It was founded by Boniface Hardin and Jane Edward Schilling in 1977 to serve low-income, minority, and adult learners and it closed at the end of 2025. It was the only predominantly Black institution (PBI) of higher education in Indiana.

== History ==
Originally named Martin Center College, the institution was independent but grew out of the Martin Center, a nonprofit human services agency. It was named after both civil rights movement leader Martin Luther King Jr. and St Martin de Porres, patron saint of mixed-race people and all those seeking racial harmony. It was the only predominantly Black institution (PBI) of higher education in Indiana. (It is excluded from the designation Historically Black Colleges and Universities (HBCU) because it was founded after the cut-off date of 1964.)

The original campus was at 35th Street and College Avenue. It moved to its final location on Avondale Place in the Martindale-Brightwood neighborhood in 1987. Housed initially in a former church and school, the campus grew to include many other structures in the immediate area.

A $10-million Educational Center and adjoining Peace Garden opened in the summer of 2001. The brick-and-stone Educational Center contained nine classrooms, faculty and staff offices, an 800-seat Gathertorium, a two-story, glass-and-steel globe, a Frederick Douglass Room, student and staff lounges, and a smoking-cessation center.

On December 9, 2025, the institution's leaders announced that it was suspending operations at the end of the month due to enrollment and financial difficulties. A few days later, all college employees were laid off. On December 31, the institution's leaders announced that the college was closed and teach out plans were being established with other colleges and universities so that Martin University students could transfer to them.

== Academics ==
Martin University offered 14 undergraduate degree programs along with 2 master's degree programs. It also had special programs in long-term care and medical coding. The college was accredited by the Higher Learning Commission.

== List of presidents ==
- Boniface Hardin
- Algeania Freeman
- Charlotte Westerhaus (acting)
- Eugene G. White
- Sean L. Huddleston
