= Allen Sessoms =

American physicist, diplomat, and academic administrator

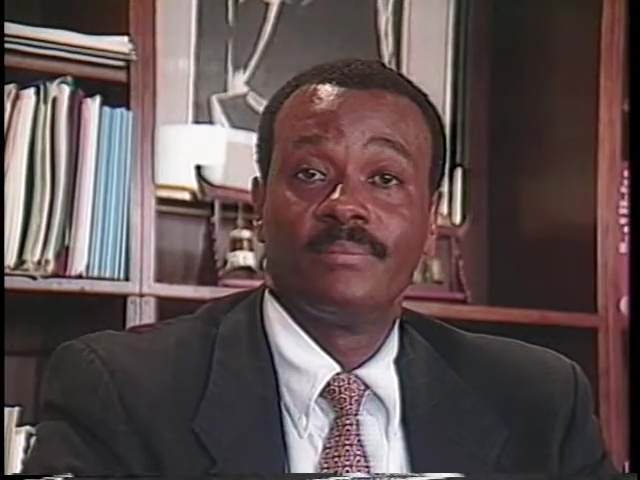
Sessoms on CUNY TV's Education Forum, 1999

Allen Lee Sessoms (born November 17, 1946) is an American physicist, diplomat, and academic administrator. His scientific research focused on quarks and related subatomic particles at CERN and Harvard University. Sessoms worked in the United States Department of State for 12 years, rising to the position of deputy ambassador at the Embassy of the United States, Mexico City. He later served as president of Queens College, City University of New York, Delaware State University, and the University of the District of Columbia.

== Education ==
Sessoms was born on November 17, 1946. He completed a B.S. in physics at Union College in 1968. He earned a M.S. in physics at University of Washington in 1969, and a D.Sc. in physics at Yale University in 1972. Sessoms was a postdoctoral researcher at the Brookhaven National Laboratory working on computer programs, and the production of quarks at the Fermilab.

== Career ==
In 1973, Sessoms became a scientific associate at the CERN researching quarks and related subatomic particles. He became an assistant professor of physics at Harvard University while working for CERN.

Sessoms was the senior technical advisor for the Bureau of Oceans and International Environmental and Scientific Affairs from 1980 to 1982, where he served as director of the Office of Technology Safeguards from 1982 to 1987. He was counselor for scientific and technological affairs at the Embassy of the United States, Paris from 1987 to 1989. Sessoms was minister-counselor of political affairs at the Embassy of the United States, Mexico City from 1989 to 1991, and served as deputy chief minister of missions (deputy ambassador) from 1991 to 1993.

Sessoms became executive vice president at University of Massachusetts in 1993 and served in the role until 1995. He was also the institutions vice president of academic affairs from 1994 to 1995. Sessoms was president of Queens College, City University of New York from 1995 to 2000. He raised academic standards, tripled annual alumni giving, and oversaw $160 million in building renovations. He established international programs. Sessoms left amid debate about lack of funding for an AIDS research center. From 2000 to 2003, Sessoms was a fellow and lecturer of public policy at the Belfer Center for Science and International Affairs.

Sessoms became the 9th president of Delaware State University in 2003, serving in the role until 2008 when he became president of the University of the District of Columbia (UDC). He was terminated from UDC in December 2012.

== Awards and honors ==
Sessoms was a Ford Foundation Fellow and a Sloan Research Fellow. The Union College and Sōka University presented him with honorary doctorates. He won the Wilbur Lucius Cross Medal in 1999. Sessoms is an Officier of the Ordre des Palmes Académiques. In 2008, he was elected Fellow of the American Physical Society.

== Personal life ==
Sessoms speaks English, Spanish, French, and German.
