= John L. Henderson =

American university administrator (1932–2026)

John Leroy Henderson (April 10, 1932 – March 21, 2026) was an American university administrator. He was President of Wilberforce University from 1988 to 2002, and the first black president of the Council of Independent Colleges.

From 2007 to 2010, Henderson served as President (Interim) of Cincinnati State Technical and Community College, during which enrollment surpassed 10,000 students for the first time.

His papers are held at the Johnnie Mae Berry Library, Cincinnati State Technical and Community College.

Henderson died on March 21, 2026, at the age of 93.
