= D. Ormonde Walker =

President of Wilberforce University (1890–1955)

10th President of Wilberforce University
- In office 1936–1941

Personal details
- Born: Dougal Ormonde Walker; January 5, 1890 British Virgin Islands
- Died: June 28, 1955 (aged 65) Kansas City, Kansas
- Children: Yvonne Walker-Taylor

Dougal Ormonde Walker (January 5, 1890 in the British Virgin Islands – June 28, 1955 in Kansas City, Kansas) was the 10th president of Wilberforce University, serving from 1936 to 1941. He was the 66th bishop of the African Methodist Episcopal Church.

His daughter, Yvonne Walker-Taylor, served as the 16th president of Wilberforce University, becoming the first female African American college president in the United States.
