= Payne Theological Seminary =

African Methodist Episcopal seminary in Wilberforce, Ohio, US

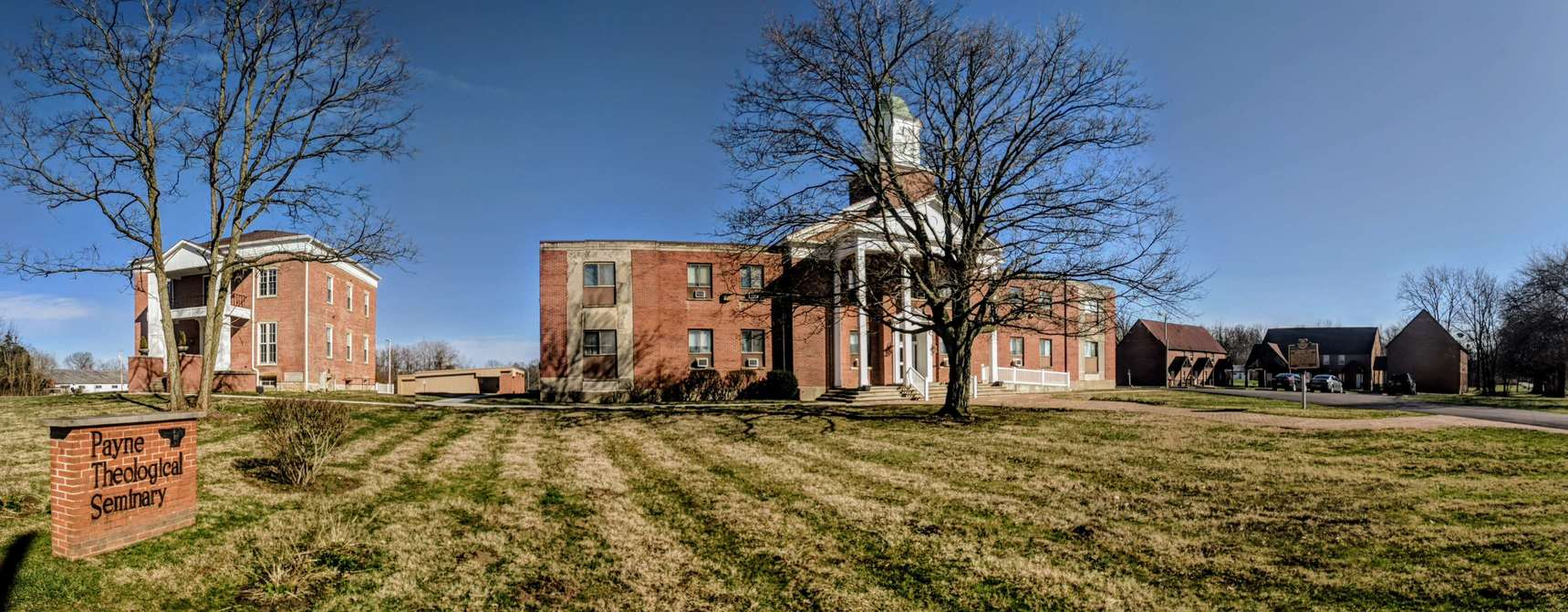
The seminary in 2019

Payne Theological Seminary is an African Methodist Episcopal seminary in Wilberforce, Ohio. One of the Historically Black Colleges and Universities, it is the oldest free-standing African-American seminary in the United States. Incorporated in 1894 by the African Methodist Episcopal Church (AME Church), it was named after Daniel Alexander Payne, the founder of Wilberforce University. Payne was Senior Bishop of the AME Church at the time of the Seminary’s founding and served as its first dean. He was the first African-American college president.

== History ==
=== Early history ===
Payne Seminary traces its origins to 1844 when the Ohio Conference of the AME Church was authorized to build a seminary and manual training school. As a result Union Seminary opened in 1847, which led to the establishment of Wilberforce University in 1862 and Payne Seminary in 1891.

The seminary’s path towards becoming a free-standing institution began in June 1890, when the board of trustees of Wilberforce University, on the motion of Bishop Abraham Grant, appointed Bishop Benjamin Arnett to chair a committee to “consider the propriety and feasibility of establishing a Theological Seminary at Wilberforce, to be part of, but not to be controlled by, a peculiar arrangement, so that it would be made more efficient than now.” The board's plan for a seminary was presented to the AME Church Council of Bishops and approved unanimously on February 28, 1891.

Once the board of trustees' organizational plans were endorsed by Wilberforce's Financial Board, it was recommended the homestead of Rev. John G. and Fannie A. Mitchell be purchased for $8,500 as the seminary's future site. This plan was presented to Wilberforce's Board of Trustees and adopted with some modifications. Daniel Payne was selected as the Seminary's first dean. The Seminary was officially dedicated on the Mitchell homestead on September 20, 1892.

On June 19, 1894, "Payne Theological Seminary of Wilberforce University" was incorporated by Alexander Wayman, Benjamin Arnett, James Handy, Benjamin Lee (Bishops of the AME Church), John Mitchell, James Shorter, and William Scarborough. The first Bachelor of Divinity graduates were: E. T. Demby, Charles Henry Johnson, and William Polk, Jr.; C. H. Colemen was awarded an English Theological certificate.

Reverend John G. Mitchell served as the seminary's second dean, from 1893 to November 1900. Bishop Benjamin T. Tanner, founder of The Christian Recorder newspaper, was dean from 1900 to 1902, but he was only on campus during commencement due to his duties as Bishop.

Discussing the necessity for Payne Seminary, the Catalogue of 1893–94 states:

The growing demands of the Church, the imperative requirements and demands of the age for trained and tried [persons] to be the moral and spiritual leaders, were weighed by the committee, who came to the unanimous conclusion that unless the Church put forth some organized effort to perpetuate an intelligent ministry, it would have to go to the rear of the procession of progress, and eventually lose its place as the leader of the advanced guard of race redeemers.

Richard R. Wright, Jr. — who taught Hebrew and New Testament Greek at Payne — reflects on the Seminary's impact in his autobiography: "As I look back, it seems marvelous that Payne Seminary could have done so well with such poor equipment and poorly prepared students. The school has furnished several bishops of the Church, college presidents and deans, teachers and many pastors of large responsibility."

=== 1902 – 1968 ===
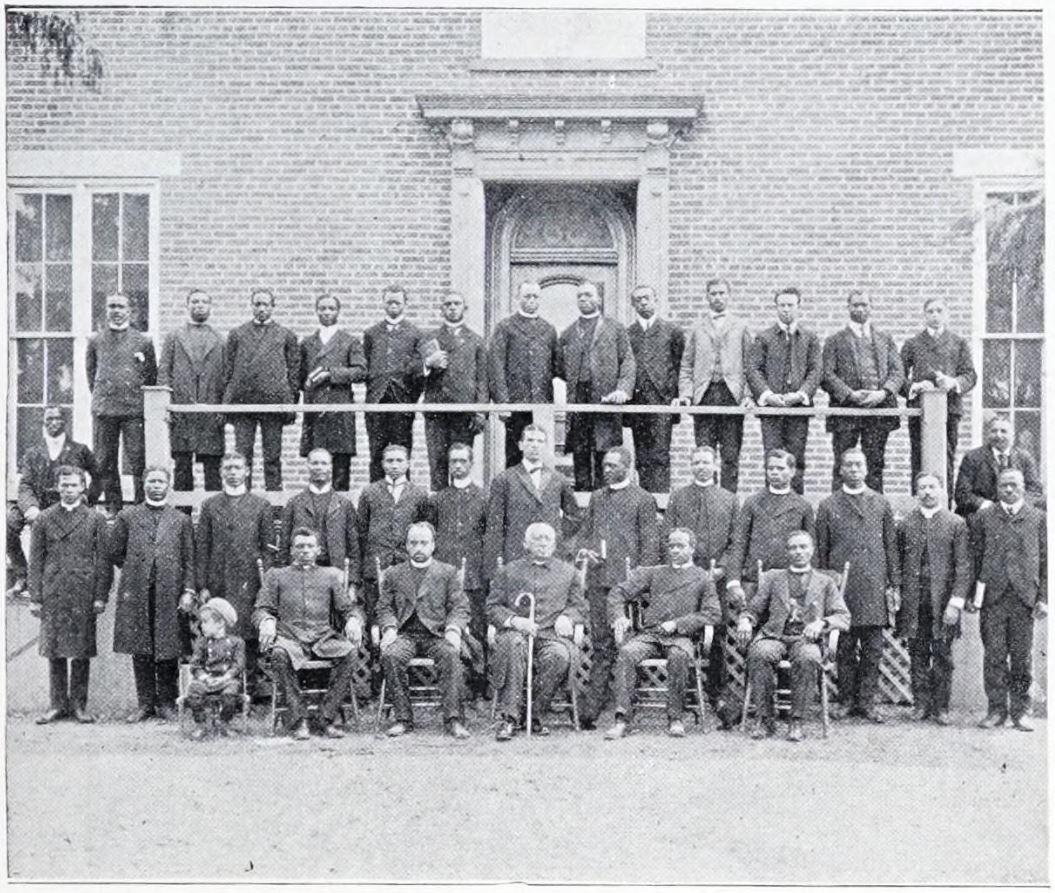
Faculty members, c. 1910

As a part of its “peculiar arrangement” with Wilberforce University, Payne Seminary’s dean assumed institutional leadership.

During his tenure from 1902 to 1937, Dean Reverend George F. Woodson increased curriculum diversity. Dean Charles S. Spivey, Sr., serving from 1937 to 1944, emphasized the need for an educated clergy. Dougal Ormonde B. Walker became the interim-dean in 1944, and despite his short tenure, began Payne's development towards becoming an accredited institution.

Dean John H. Lewis held the office from 1944 to 1951, during which he continued the accreditation process that Walker initiated. Lewis emphasized the need to renovate the campus' buildings and grounds by appealing for the construction of a new administrative building.

During the 1951 to 1956 tenure of Dean Rembert E. Stokes, enrollment increased, the administration building was completed, and the stained glass windows of The Chapel of the Living Savior were installed. Stokes commissioned experts to produce stained-glass windows for the Chapel, which featured Biblical heroes (Jesus, Moses, Amos, St. Paul, and Martin Luther) and AME Church heroes (Wesley, Wilberforce, Allen, and Payne). The nine glass windows are acclaimed for their conceptual and artistic design. Stokes left Payne Seminary to become president of Wilberforce University in 1956. Payne’s chapel currently serves as the congregational home for Holy Trinity AME Church.

Dean Charles S. Spivey, Jr. served from 1957 to 1967, when he raised funds to furnish the academic building and the Chapel of the Living Savior. Alvia A. Shaw served as interim-Dean in 1968.
