= Boniface Hardin =

American monk, social activist and university president

The Rev. Boniface Hardin OSB
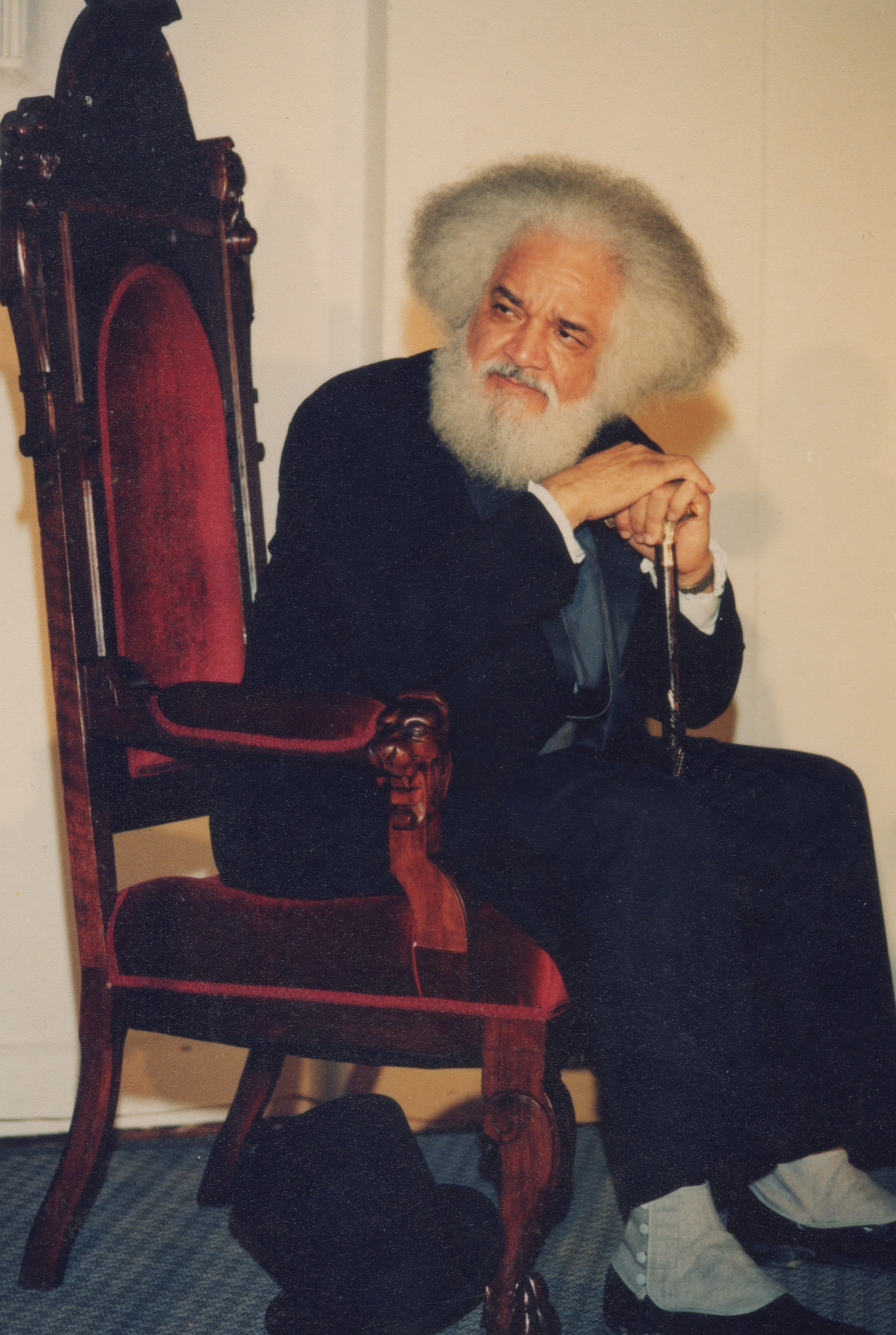
- Boniface Hardin depicting Frederick Douglass
- Born: James Randolph Hardin; November 18, 1933
- Died: March 24, 2012 (aged 78); Indianapolis, Indiana, USA
- Occupation: University President
- Known for: Social activism, education

Boniface Hardin, OSB (born James Dwight Randolph "Randy" Hardin; November 18, 1933 – March 24, 2012), was a Benedictine monk, social activist and founding president of Martin University in Indianapolis, Indiana.

== Early years ==
Born James Randolph Hardin on November 18, 1933, in the Louisville, Kentucky General Hospital, Hardin was the oldest surviving son of Elizabeth Hansbro Hardin and Albert Augustin Hardin; an older brother, Albert Arthur, died in infancy. His parents were both graduates of the normal school at Kentucky State Industrial College for Colored Persons, which eventually became Kentucky State University. Although his mother remained a teacher in New Haven, Kentucky for her whole career, his father turned to jobs that brought more income, including waiter, shopkeeper, and shipyard laborer.

Hardin's middle name, Randolph, honored A. Philip Randolph, the founder of the Pullman Porters Union, who was a frequent visitor to the home of Albert Hansbro, Hardin's grandfather and a train porter. Known as Randy in his youth, which was spent in Bardstown, Kentucky, Hardin was a serious student and devout Catholic. Early on, he memorized the words to the Latin Mass and became known as a bright and dependable altar boy. As part of the World War II war effort, his father had to work at the Jeffersonville Boatworks in southern Indiana, relocating the family from Bardstown to the Smoketown section of Louisville, Kentucky. Here, Hardin attended St. Peter Claver elementary school.

At age 13, Hardin proclaimed a vocation to the priesthood. His mentors, Fr Michael Lally from St. Monica's, Fr Simon Griesam, and the school principal, Sr Inez, supported his goal, only to learn that Archbishop John A. Floersh rejected Hardin's admission to the Louisville seminary on the basis of his race. Hardin's family learned that St. Meinrad Seminary in Indiana had just begun to take African-American students into their high school program. The family and the parish community pooled their resources to send Hardin to St. Meinrad, since the Archbishop refused to support him financially.

During his time at St. Meinrad, Hardin decided to become a monk rather than a diocesan priest, and was given the name Boniface. He was ordained in 1959, on what he called, "the most important day of my life."

Hardin's first assignment as a priest was as assistant treasurer at St. Meinrad; he completed studies in business at the University of Notre Dame to prepare him for this role. After six years, he became increasingly restless, feeling isolated and unable to use his talents and knowledge. In 1965, he responded to the invitation of Father Albert Ajamie of Holy Angels Church in Indianapolis to serve as his associate pastor.

== Holy Angels years ==
By the mid-1960s, Holy Angels Parish was one of three African American majority Catholic churches in Indianapolis. From the onset of his time there, Hardin was attuned to racism in the Catholic Church as well as in the broader society. He quickly became involved in protests opposing police brutality, segregation, poverty, and the construction of a highway, Interstate 65, that threatened to cut the neighborhood surrounding Holy Angels in two. He became increasingly radical, calling public officials to task, and exchanging his Roman collar and close cropped hair for a dashiki and Afro. When the existing prelate of the Archdiocese of Indianapolis, Archbishop Paul Schulte, was pressured to silence Hardin, he ordered him to return to St. Meinrad. Holy Angels parishioners and other supporters responded by staging a walkout during the Easter Sunday services conducted by Archbishop Schulte in Saints Peter & Paul Cathedral on April 6, 1969. The Archbishop subsequently rescinded his order, but Hardin decided that he could no longer serve effectively and resigned his post at Holy Angels in December 1969 to found the Martin Center.

== The Martin Center years ==
With the help of a sympathetic priest, Father Bernard Strange, of St. Rita's parish in Indianapolis, as well as Holy Angels parishioners and other supporters, Hardin bought a property on College Avenue in Indianapolis and founded the Martin Center. Named for Martin Luther King and St. Martin de Porres, the center was described in 1970 brochure as a "biracial and ecumenical effort to overcome the polarization brought about by ignorance, injustice and hostility between blacks and whites in the metropolitan area of Indianapolis."

Hardin was soon joined by Sister Jane Schilling, a sister of St. Joseph of Carondolet, who had been principal at Holy Angels School. Their partnership, with Hardin as the idea generator and public figure and Sister Jane as researcher and administrator, was to last through his life. To raise funds for the Martin Center, Hardin served as a consultant with major corporations, school systems, and others on race relations training. As he traveled and brought in income, Sister Jane managed the programs that Martin Center offered to the local community on African American history and culture, race relations, and other topics.

In 1971, Hardin and Dr. Raymond Pierce received a grant to establish the Sickle Cell Center to test for the disease and to educate families. The grant enabled them to purchase another building on College Avenue. A third building was added when Martin Center opened the Afro-American Institute, devoted to research and education about African history and African American culture. The Institute maintained a library of resources and offered leadership and educational programs.

Hardin and Sister Jane used a variety of media to disseminate their educational programs. They produced and co-hosted a weekly radio program, The Afro-American in Indiana, which ran from 1971 to 1991 on WIAN, the local public schools station, eventually affiliated with National Public Radio; served as editors of a journal, The Afro-American Journal, begun in 1973; produced and co-hosted the television program, Afro-American, for public television station WFYI from 1974 to 1979; and narrated two full-length TV documentaries, The Kingdom Builders, and For Love of Freedom, for WRTV, the local NBC affiliate.

As Hardin became increasingly concerned about the lack of good higher educational options for African-American adults in the community, he developed plans to establish a university. In 1977, Martin Center College was established and given state accreditation. It was formally accredited in 1987 by the North Central Association of Colleges and Schools. The educational philosophy of the institution, championed by Sister Jane Schilling, rested on Paulo Freire's ideas of emancipatory education, the adult learning principles of Malcolm Knowles, and credit for prior life experience as promoted by the Council for Advancement and Evaluation of Learning. These approaches, tailored to the adult learner who had not completed college earlier in life, earned Martin the nickname, "the Second Chance School."

== Martin University years ==
As Martin Center College increased in size and reputation and moved in 1987 to a larger campus on the east side of Indianapolis, Hardin was recognized as a key educational leader. He was a frequent speaker and received many awards. He became known for his ecumenism, social justice orientation, and humility. He continued to perform priestly responsibilities at local area churches on a regular basis. Thought by many to resemble orator and abolitionist, Frederick Douglass, Hardin was closely identified with Douglass through his popular reenactments of incidents in Douglass's life. These were offered annually at the university and at other locales in the community.

As President, Hardin was successful in gaining significant external funding for the institution, primarily from the Lilly Endowment. The college became a separate entity from Martin Center in 1979 and, with the addition of two master's degrees, became Martin University in 1989. The Lady Elizabeth program, located in the nearby women's prison, was established in 1988 and ran until 2003 when prisoners were moved from Indianapolis to Rockville, Indiana. In 2000, the Martin University Education Center, the first newly constructed building, was opened.

Over the course of Hardin's presidency, enrollment went from a handful of students to almost 1,000. By the time of his retirement in December 2007, 1,370 bachelor's and master's degrees had been awarded by Martin. The student body consisted of primarily African American students, a large proportion of which were women, with an average student age hovering around 38 years old.

In addition to his achievements at Martin University, Hardin became a leading community figure in Indianapolis. He was consultant for Affirmative Action Programs and Training of Affirmative Action Officers, Co-chairperson of the Indianapolis Black Coalition Advocate of Reforms in Police Community Relations; and member of several organizations, including the Mayor's Task Force and Board of Directors for the Indianapolis Project against AIDS for Minorities, Board of Directors of the Benjamin Harrison Home, Indiana State Penal Reform Committee, Tuskegee Airmen, the Downtown Rotary Club of Indianapolis, the Indiana Association of Women in Education, and the National Council of Negro Women.

Hardin experienced a number of health challenges during his life, the most serious of which was prostate cancer in 2002. He became an outspoken advocate for cancer awareness, diabetes, and other health issues.

== Retirement and death ==
Although he planned to write several books following his 2007 retirement, Hardin was troubled by turmoil that ensued at Martin University with the advent of his successor, who made rapid changes. He suffered a stroke in September, 2011, and died on March 24, 2012. He is buried at St. Meinrad Archabbey in southern Indiana.

== Awards and recognitions ==
2002 International Citizen of the Year by the International Center of Indianapolis

2002 "Living Legend" by the Indiana Historical Society

2002 Living Legends in Black by the Hoosier Minority Black Chamber of Commerce.

2001 NUVO Cultural Vision Award for Lifetime Achievement

"Living the Legacy" Award for Exemplifying the Principles of Dr. King for the Citizens of this Community from The Martin Luther King Jr., Multi-Service Center

Dr. Martin Luther King Jr. Legacy Award from Perry Township Schools

Spirit of Justice award from the Indiana Civil Rights Commission

Outstanding Community Service to Children and Youth and the Empowerment of the Community from Boys and Girls Clubs of Indianapolis

Indiana Black Expo President Image Award, Urban League of Madison County, Inc.

Advanced Opportunities and Education Award, City of Indianapolis

Distinguished and Valuable Service to Humankind Award, Eta Chi Chapter, Psi Eta Chi Sorority

Who's Who in Black Indianapolis

The Spirit of Indy Award

Scroll of Merit Award, National Medical Association

Sagamore of the Wabash

1997 Distinguished Alumnus Award from Saint Meinrad Seminary

Honorary Doctorates: Indiana University, Ancilla College, Manchester University, the University of Indianapolis, Governor's State University, Oakland City University, Marian University, Franklin College, and Christian Theological Seminary.
