= Harry L. Williams =

American educator

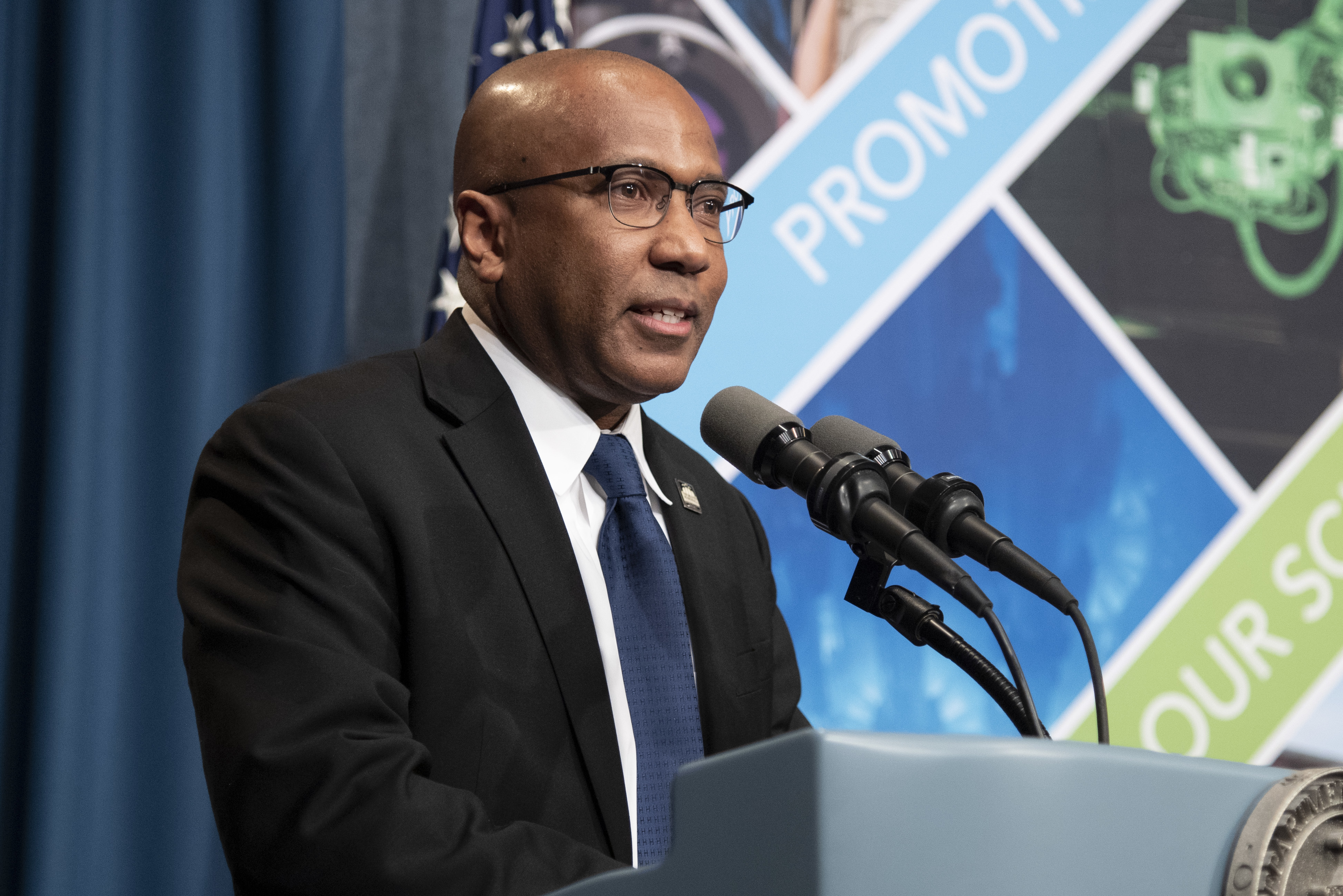
- Williams in 2020
- Born: Harry Lee Williams; Greenville, North Carolina, U.S.
- Education: Appalachian State University, B.S.; East Tennessee State University, Ed.D.
- Occupations: President & CEO of Thurgood Marshall College Fund
- Spouse: Robin S. Williams
- Children: 2
- Website: www.tmcf.org

Harry L. Williams is an American educator who is president and CEO of the Thurgood Marshall College Fund (TMCF), an organization representing the Black College Community. Williams oversees its 53 member-schools. Williams has held positions within the University of North Carolina General Administration, Appalachian State University, North Carolina A&T State University, and Delaware State University.

== Personal life and education ==
Williams was born and raised in Greenville, North Carolina. He and his wife, Robin S. Williams are the parents of two sons. After earning his Bachelors of Science in Communications Broadcasting, and his Masters of Art in Educational Media from Appalachian State University, Williams earned his Doctorate of Education, Educational Leadership and Policy Analysis from East Tennessee State University.

== Career ==
Williams was president of Delaware State University (DSU) where he worked for eight years.

In 2017, Williams was selected by the TMCF board of directors to be the next president and CEO.

Williams has written opinion-editorials on higher education, diversity, partnerships, HBCU sustainability, and advocacy.
