= Frances Murphy Draper =

American teacher, newspaper executive and pastor

- Born: December 18, 1947; Baltimore
- Alma mater: Morgan State University; Johns Hopkins University; University of Maryland; Loyola University Maryland
- Employer: Baltimore Afro-American (1973–1976); Baltimore Afro-American (1986–1999)

Frances Murphy Draper also known as Toni, is an American teacher, newspaper executive and pastor. She was President of the Baltimore Afro-American from 1988 to 1999, and subsequently pastor of Freedom Temple African Methodist Episcopal Zion Church in Baltimore. In 2018 she became chairman of the board and publisher of AFRO-American Newspapers.

== Life ==
Frances Mary Draper was born on 18 December 1947 in Baltimore. Her great-grandfather, John H. Murphy Sr., founded the Baltimore Afro-American in 1892, and established the Murphy family as a Baltimore newspaper clan. Draper's grandfather Carl J. Murphy edited the paper from 1922 to 1967; her grandmother Vashti Turley Murphy was one of the founding members of Delta Sigma Theta; and her aunt Elizabeth Murphy Moss was the first black woman to be certified as an overseas war correspondent in World War II. Her mother, Frances L. Murphy II, served as publisher and chairman of the AFRO-American board in the 1970s.

After a BA in Spanish education at Morgan State University in 1969, Draper worked as a teacher, gaining a M.Ed. from Johns Hopkins University in 1973. From 1973 to 1976 she managed the New Jersey edition of the Afro-American. From 1976 to 1978 she worked as an account executive at Merrill Lynch, Pierce, Fenner & Smith, before joining Morgan State University in 1978 as an assistant vice president of development. In 1986 she rejoined the Afro-American as the paper's president. She remained in that role until 1999, combining her newspaper activity with further study. She earned an M.B.A. from the University of Maryland, Baltimore in 1981, and an M.S. in pastoral counseling in 1996 from Loyola College in Maryland.

Draper left the paper again in 1999. In 2002 she became pastor of the John Wesley AME Zion Church in Baltimore, later renamed the Freedom Temple African Methodist Episcopal Zion Church. In 2006 she gained a D.Min. from United Theological Seminary. In 2018 she returned to AFRO-American Newspapers as chairman of the board.

== Works ==
- Relationship Theology: a Model for Producing Healthy Marriages in the African American Context. United Theological Seminary, 2006.
- No Ordinary Hook Up: The Courtship of Vashti Turley and Carl Murphy 1915-1916. CreateSpace Independent Publishing Platform, 2016.
