= The Washington Afro-American =

Washington D.C. newspaper

Coordinates: 38.911631°N 77.032166°W

The Washington Afro American
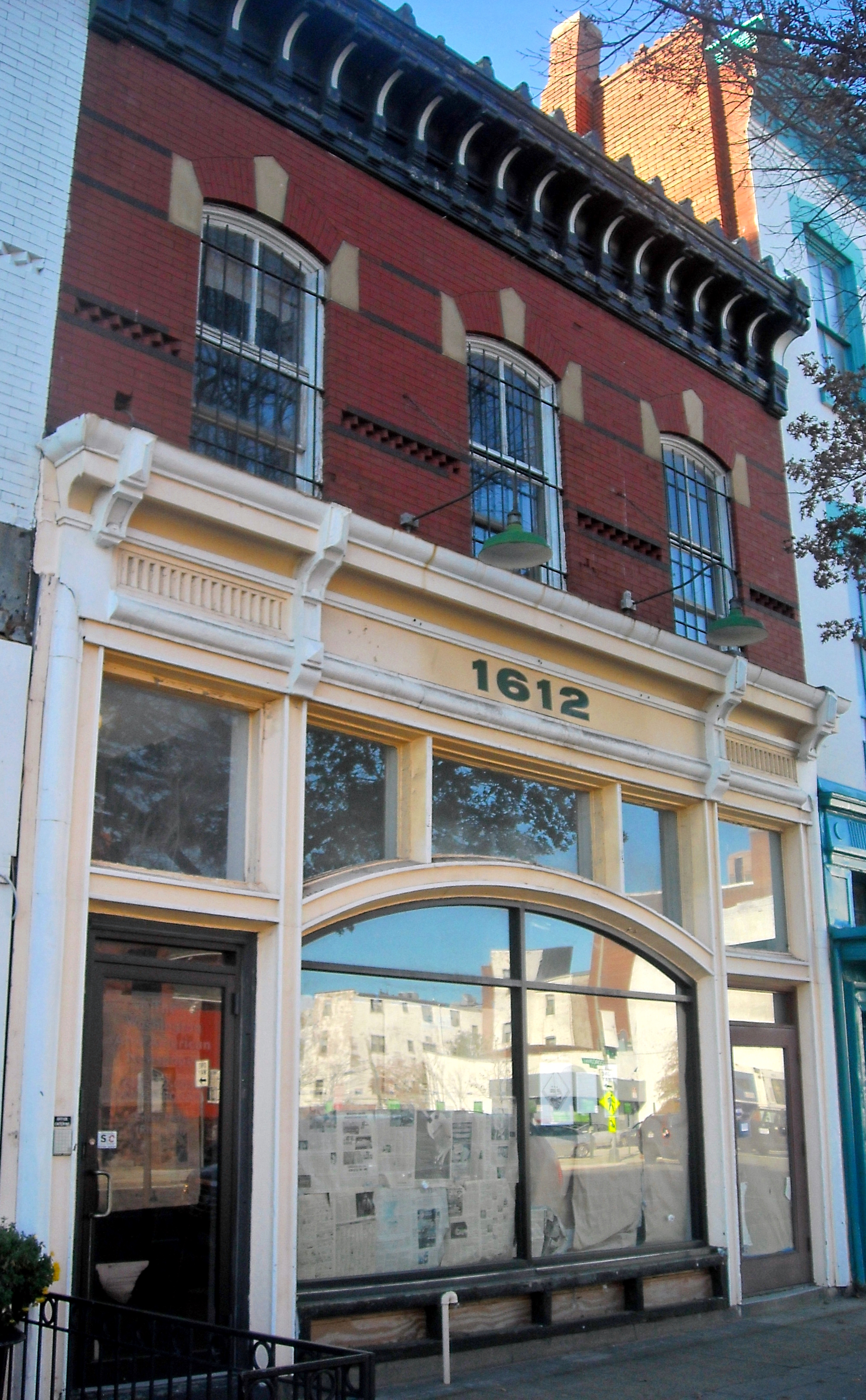
- The Washington Afro-American Newspaper Office Building, former site of The Washington Afro American newsroom, located in the Logan Circle neighborhood (2009)
- Type: Weekly newspaper
- Founder: John H. Murphy, Sr.
- Publisher: Frances Draper
- President: Benjamin M. Phillips
- Editor: Micha Green, Washington D.C. Editor
- Founded: August 13, 1892; 133 years ago
- Language: English
- Headquarters: 1531 S. Edgewood St. Suite B, Baltimore, MD 21227 U.S.
- Circulation: 25,000 (as of 2019)
- ISSN: 0276-6523
- OCLC number: 34404244
- Website: www.afro.com
- Free online archives: Google News Archive

The Washington Afro-American newspaper is the Washington, D.C. edition of The Afro-American Newspaper.

== History ==
The newspaper was founded in 1892 by Civil War veteran Sgt. John H. Murphy Sr.. Murphy merged his church publication, The Sunday School Helper, with two other church publications, The Ledger and The Afro-American, and the publication rose to prominence under the control of his tenth-born child, Carl J. G. Murphy, who served as its editor for 45 years. Followed by his grandson, George B. Murphy Jr., who served as editor in chief.

There have been as many as 13 editions of the newspaper in major cities across the country; today, there are just two: one in Baltimore, the other in Washington, D.C.

== Call numbers ==
Because of its varied titles over the years, The Washington Afro-American has received numerous different call numbers from the Library of Congress and OCLC:

- The Afro-American (1936–1937):
  - LCCN sn96095001
  - OCLC 34404244
- Washington Afro American (1937–1964):
  - LCCN sn87062261
  - OCLC 16156417
- Washington Afro-American (1930s–1964):
  - ISSN 0043-0447
  - LCCN sn84025928
  - OCLC 2269349
- Washington Afro-American and The Washington Tribune (1964–1984):
  - LCCN sn81003305, sn87062260
  - OCLC 7383870, 16156425
- The Afro-American (1988):
  - LCCN sn92057030
  - OCLC 17795690
- Washington Afro-American and Washington Tribune (1984–2015):
  - ISSN 0276-6523
  - LCCN sn92003332
  - OCLC 26136335

== See also ==
- List of African-American newspapers in Washington, D.C.
