= Laura W. Murphy =

American lobbyist and civil rights activist

- Born: October 3, 1955 (age 70); Baltimore, Maryland, U.S.
- Education: Wellesley College (BA)
- Occupations: activist, lobbyist
- Spouse: Bill Psillas
- Parent(s): William H. Murphy Sr. Madeline Wheeler Murphy
- Relatives: Billy Murphy Jr. (brother); George B. Murphy Jr. (uncle), John H. Murphy Sr. (great-grandfather); Chris Rabb (nephew}
- Website: lwmurphy.com

Laura W. Murphy (born October 3, 1955) is an American lobbyist and civil rights activist. She served as the director of the Washington Legislative Office for the American Civil Liberties Union from 1993 to 2005.

== Early life, family, and education ==
Murphy was born on October 3, 1955 in Baltimore to Madeline Wheeler Murphy, a community activist, and judge William H. Murphy Sr., one of the first African-American judges to serve on Baltimore's district court. She is the sister of Judge Billy Murphy Jr. Murphy's uncle, George B. Murphy Jr., was a prominent African-American journalist. She is a great-granddaughter of John H. Murphy Sr., a publisher who founded the Baltimore Afro-American newspaper. She is a direct descendent of Philip Livingston, a signatory of the United States Declaration of Independence.

Murphy grew up in the Cherry Hill neighborhood in Baltimore. She graduated from Wellesley College with a bachelor of arts degree in 1976.

== Career ==
After graduating from Wellesley, Murphy became one of the youngest legislative assistants on Capitol Hill, working for Rep. Parren Mitchell, the first African-American congressman from Maryland. She also worked for Rep. Shirley Chisholm, Mayor Willie Brown, Mayor Sharon Pratt Kelly, and Rev. Jesse Jackson.

After working for Congresswoman Chisholm, Murphy was recruited by the American Civil Liberties Union to be a lobbyist on civil and women's rights. In 1982, she pushed for an extension to the Voting Rights Act. Murphy served as the director of the Washington Legislative Office for the American Civil Liberties Union from 1993 to 2005. With ACLU, Murphy helped pass the Fair Sentencing Act and the USA Freedom Act and testified over a dozen times before the United States Congress.

Murphy is the president of the law firm Laura Murphy & Associates. She led civil rights audits of Airbnb in 2016 and Facebook in 2020.

In 2016, she was named a Harvard University Advanced Leadership Fellow.

She was a supporter of the legalization of same-sex marriage in Maryland.

== Personal life ==
Murphy is married to Bill Psillas. She is the aunt of Pennsylvania politician Chris Rabb.

She is a member of the Ruth Brewster Chapter of the Daughters of the American Revolution in Washington, D.C. In 2012, she attended the DAR's annual Continental Congress in Washington, D.C. and read from the Declaration of Independence at an Independence Day celebration.
