= John H. Murphy III =

American newspaper executive (1916–2010)

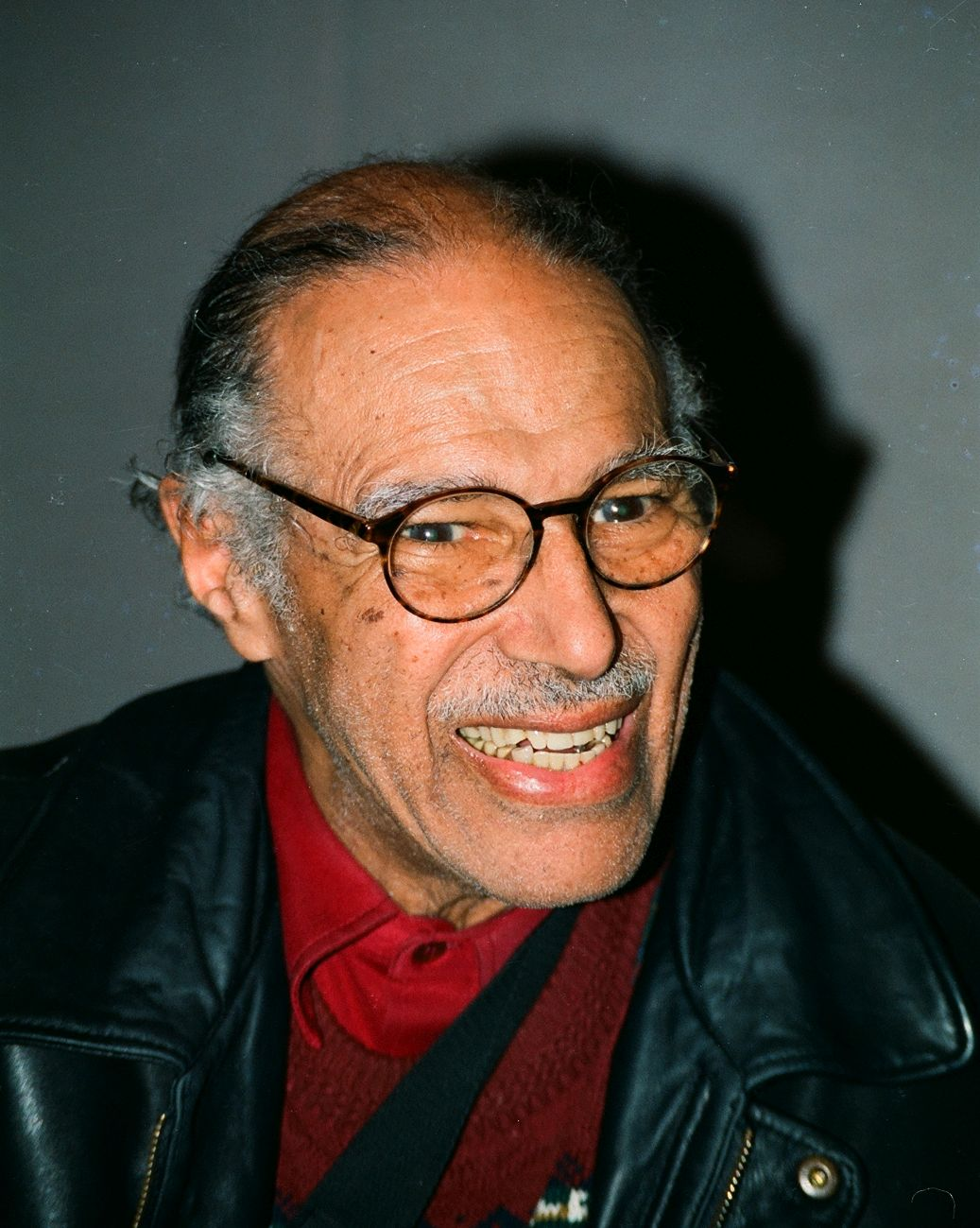
- Murphy in 1995
- Born: March 2, 1916; Baltimore, Maryland, U.S.
- Died: October 16, 2010 (aged 94); Timonium, Maryland, U.S.
- Education: Temple University (BA)
- Occupations: newspaper publisher, newspaper executive
- Spouse(s): Alice Quivers (m. 1940–1979; her death); Camay Calloway Brooks (m. 1980–2010; his death)
- Children: 2
- Relatives: Carl J. Murphy (uncle), John H. Murphy Sr. (grandfather), William H. Murphy Sr. (cousin), George B. Murphy Jr. (cousin)

John Henry Murphy III (March 2, 1916 – October 16, 2010), was an American newspaper publisher and executive, head of the family-owned enterprise of the Afro-American newspaper based in Baltimore, Maryland. At its peak, it had nine national editions, published in 13 major cities. Murphy was the grandson of the paper's founder, former slave and Civil War veteran John H. Murphy Sr. After working from 1937 as manager of the paper's Washington, D.C., edition, and in other positions, Murphy succeeded his uncle Carl J. Murphy in 1967 as president of the Afro-American papers, and in 1974 as chairman of the board and publisher.

== Life and career ==
John Henry Murphy III was born on March 2, 1916, to Daniel H. Murphy and Sara Murphy Neely in Baltimore, Maryland. He was named for his father and grandfather; the latter had founded the Baltimore Afro-American at the end of the 19th century. After his parents separated, John moved with his mother to Philadelphia, where he graduated from Overbrook High School.

He earned his bachelor's degree in business administration from Temple University in 1937.

After graduation, Murphy joined the family newspaper business. He was assigned to work as office manager at the Washington Afro-American, based in the capital.

Murphy worked in a variety of positions to learn the family newspaper business, which his uncle Carl J. Murphy expanded to 13 major cities at its peak during his 45 years of leadership. In 1967 Murphy III was named president of the Afro-American papers, succeeding his uncle. One of his innovations was a weekly supplement, Dawn magazine, which attracted advertising and addressed issues of interest to middle-class readers. The business still published a national edition and local versions in several East Coast and Southern cities.

In 1974, Murphy became board chairman and publisher. Through these years, the business faced increasing competition for advertising dollars from television, and later the Internet. It has reduced the number of editions it publishes. In 1986, Murphy retired as chairman of the board of the newspaper company.

Murphy was also a photographer, taking family pictures, as well as pictures for the Baltimore Times. He retained connections in Washington, D.C., after working there for years. He was a member of St. James Episcopal Church in West Baltimore, Maryland for about 60 years.

Murphy died at the age of 94 on October 16, 2010, in a nursing home in Timonium, Maryland. He was survived by his wife Camay Calloway Murphy; and two children, Sharon V. Moore and Daniel H. Murphy.

== Personal life ==
In 1940, he married Alice Quivers, and they had two children, Daniel and Sharon.

Murphy remarried to educator Camay Calloway Brooks in 1980, a year after his first wife died. She is the daughter of Cab Calloway, the noted jazz musician raised in Baltimore, who was associated as having one of the house bands at the Cotton Club in Harlem, New York. She was also one of the first African-Americans to teach in white schools in Virginia.
