= Louise Kerr Hines =

Civil rights activist (1916–2007)

Louise Kerr Hines (born Louise Lyles Kerr) (born March 15, 1916 – April 9, 2007) was an African American Civil Rights activist. In 1945, Hines, along with her father, Dr. T. Henderson Kerr, were plaintiffs in a lawsuit against the Enoch Pratt Free Library for their denial of her application for their library training course.

Hines was born in Baltimore and graduated Frederick Douglass High School. After graduating from Coppin Normal School (now Coppin State University), Hines was employed as a teacher in segregated Baltimore schools. In 1943, after working as a teacher for five years, Hines saw an advertisement in the Baltimore Sun for a position for a "colored" assistant for the library, but she was denied due to her race. The Pratt had previously hired two African-American library assistants to work at a branch located in a predominantly African-American neighborhood, however they did not receive training through the library course. After being persuaded by Carl J. Murphy of the Baltimore Afro-American newspaper and Lillie Mae Carroll Jackson of the Baltimore branch of the NAACP, Hines, along with her father, sued the library. They were represented by William A.C. Hughes and Charles Hamilton Houston.

Hughes and Houston argued that the library, as public institution which received funds from the city, were in violation of the law for barring tax-paying African-Americans from the course. The case was initially dismissed because the judge argued that the library was a private corporation, not a governmental agency. However, after the case was appealed to the 4th U.S. District Court of Appeals, the court ruled that the library was an "instrumentality of the State of Maryland" and had violated Hines' Fourteenth Amendment rights. The library appealed the case to the U.S. Supreme Court, but it was dismissed. The library training course as subsequently opened to all applicants, but was later disbanded.

During the case, Hines worked as a secretary for the Baltimore NAACP and a reporter for the Afro-American. She would ultimately work as a claims examiner for the Maryland Department of Human Resources, where she retired in 1978. Hines was later honored in 1986 at the centennial celebration of the library. She died of cancer on April 9, 2007 in Baltimore at the age of 91.
