= Vashti Murphy McKenzie =

Former AME bishop

The Right Reverend Vashti Murphy McKenzie
- President and General Secretary of the National Council of Churches
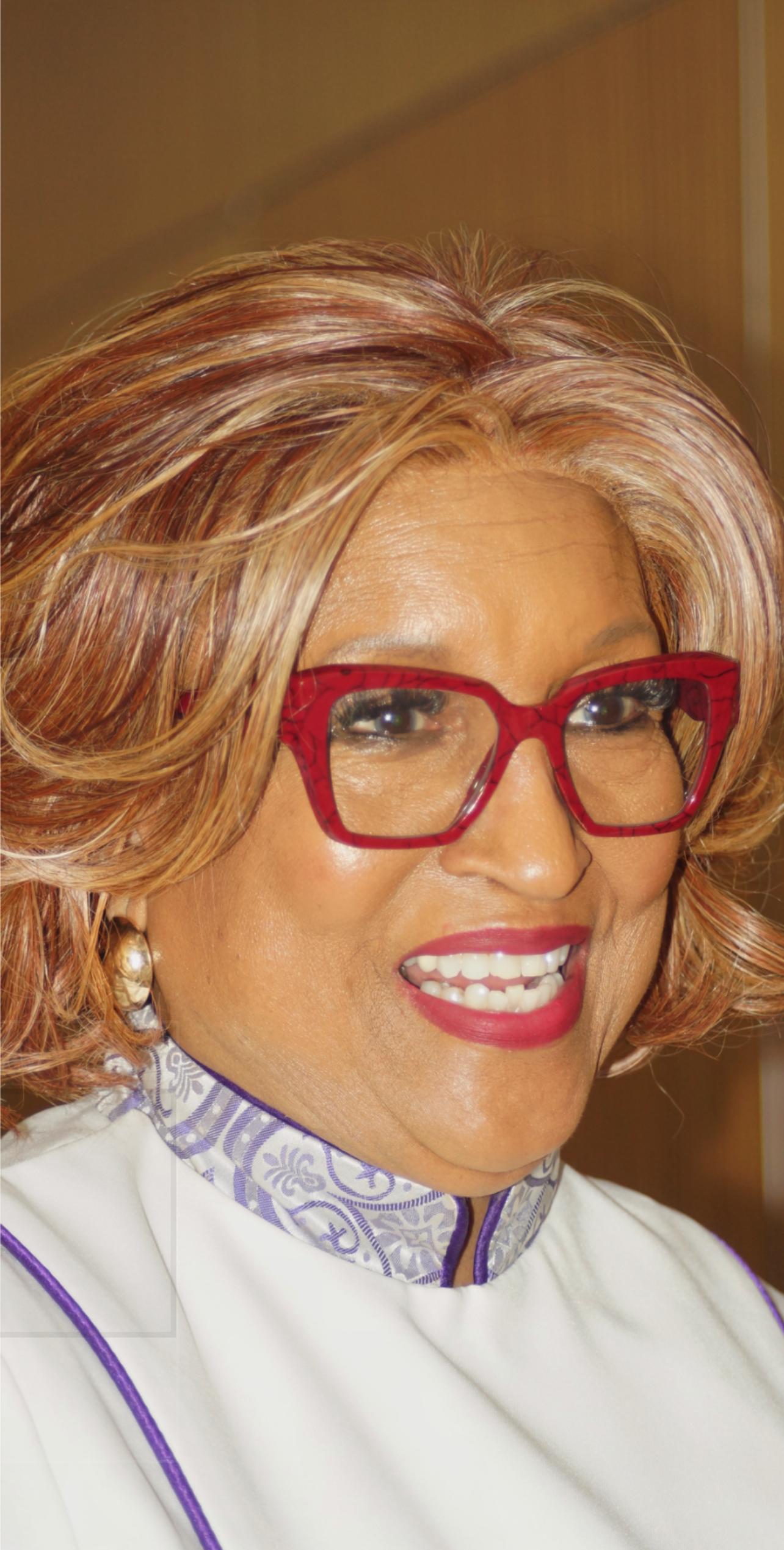
- McKenzie in 2026 at Howard University's Andrew Ranken Chapel
- Previous posts: President of the Council of Bishops, African Methodist Episcopal Church

Personal details
- Born: May 28, 1947 (age 79) Baltimore, Maryland
- Parents: Ida Murphy Peters and Edward Smith
- Spouse: Stan McKenzie

Vashti Murphy McKenzie (born May 28, 1947) is the President and General Secretary of the National Council of Churches of Christ in the USA. She is also a retired bishop of the African Methodist Episcopal Church, and author of six books. In 2000, McKenzie became the first woman to be elected as bishop in the denomination's history. She later served as President of the Council of Bishops, becoming the first woman to serve as Titular head of the AME Church.

== Early life and education ==
Vashti was born on May 28, 1947, in Baltimore, Maryland. She is the daughter of Samuel Edward Smith and Ida Murphy Smith Peters. She was named after her maternal grandmother, Vashti Turley Murphy, who was one of 22 women who founded the Delta Sigma Theta sorority in 1913, while a student at Howard University.

McKenzie's maternal grandfather, Carl J. Murphy, was the publisher and chief editor of the Baltimore Afro-American, a black newspaper started by his father, John H. Murphy, Sr. The newspaper was a family enterprise, and Murphy's five daughters were involved as publishers, editors, journalists, and board members. McKenzie began writing for publication at an early age; she recalls that her first journalism opportunity was writing obituaries at age 16.

McKenzie attended high school at Eastern High School, an all-female public high school in Baltimore City. She was one of only six black students in the school, which had been desegregated in the wake of the Brown vs. Board of Education decision in 1954. McKenzie graduated from Eastern High in 1965.

Following her graduation from high school, McKenzie studied at the Blair School of Journalism for one summer, before matriculating at Morgan State University, where she studied history. In her junior year, she left school to marry Stan McKenzie, who was playing for the Baltimore Bullets in the NBA. The couple moved to Arizona when Stan McKenzie was traded to the Phoenix Suns. Later, the McKenzies moved back to Baltimore. Vashti McKenzie went back to school, and earned a Bachelor of Arts in journalism at the University of Maryland.

== Career ==
After graduating with her degree, McKenzie pursued journalism as a career. She worked at WYCB Radio, and was host of an R&B show. She later was promoted to Station Manager, which was a position few women held at the time. She continued in broadcasting for several years. She also wrote a column for the Afro-American, entitled "The McKenzie Report."

However, McKenzie felt a calling to the ministry, and began studies at Howard University School of Divinity where she obtained a Masters of Divinity. She was ordained as an itinerant deacon in 1981, and ordained as a full minister in 1984. She later completed a Doctorate in Ministry from United Theological Seminary in Ohio.

McKenzie's first pastorate was Bethel AME Church located in Chesapeake City, which is on Maryland's upper Eastern Shore. A few years later she was appointed to Oak Street AME church in Baltimore. In 1990, she became the first woman to serve as the pastor at Payne Memorial AME Church in Baltimore, Maryland. During the ten years she served in this role, she helped grow the church, and also expand its ministry in the community. In 1996, she offered the closing prayer on the first night of the Democratic National Convention. In 1998, Ebony named McKenzie as one of the "15 Greatest Black Woman Preachers" in the US. She tied for first in the balloting, along with Rev. Prathia Hall and Rev. Carolyn Knight.

In 2000, McKenzie made the decision to run for election to the position of bishop in her denomination. As a first time candidate, McKenzie had to explain to church leaders and members why she was qualified to be the first woman bishop. In an interview for a Christian Post article in 2019, she noted that running for bishop meant '"[h]elping people to take a look at your ministerial track record in your pastorate. The kinds of things that you have done,' she explained. 'Being able to get that message out, being able to show people that it’s not just me being female, that I have had experiences, I'm qualified, and take a look at how God has blessed our ministry as an indication of what we can do in the future.'”

There were 42 candidates for bishop in the election, two of whom were women. In addition to McKenzie, Rev. Carolyn Tyler Guidry, the first woman to serve as presiding elder in the Fifth District of AME Church, also ran for election. (Guidry was later elected as the 122nd Bishop of the AME Church in 2004.) McKenzie received the second-highest number of votes when the General Council of the AME Church voted in July at the national convention in Cincinnati. In her acceptance speech, she is quoted as saying, "Because of God’s favor, the stained-glass ceiling has been pierced and broken.” She was consecrated as the 117th bishop in the AME Church, and became the first woman to be elevated to the episcopacy .

In her first post as bishop, she was named to the 18th district, which has oversight for AME churches in Africa, mainly in Botswana, Lesotho, Mozambique and Swaziland. She later served as presiding prelate for the Thirteenth District AME, which covers Tennessee and Kentucky. While serving in this role, she was invited by President Barack Obama to join the inaugural President's Advisory Council of the White House Faith-Based and Neighborhood Partnerships. In 2012, she moved to the Tenth Episcopal District in Texas, where she presided until her retirement in 2021 at the 51st General Conference in Orlando, FL.

In 2005, she became the titular head of the AME Church, again making history, this time as the first woman to lead the denomination. She was the host Bishop for the 2012 AME General Conference held in Nashville, TN.

She has written several books on leadership for women in ministry, including Not Without A Struggle, and Strength in the Struggle. She is also the national chaplain of Delta Sigma Theta sorority, Incorporated.

In 2014, she was listed as one of 50 "Powerful Women Religious Figures Around The World" by the Huffington Post.

McKenzie was among a number of African American women from around the United States who endorsed Hillary Rodham Clinton for President in 2016.

== Personal life ==
Vashti Murphy McKenzie and her late husband have three children: Jon-Mikael McKenzie, Vashti-Jasmine Saint-Jean, and Joi-Marie McKenzie Lewis. She also has three grandchildren, Vashti-Gracia Saint-Jean, Blake Lewis, and Brenton Lewis.

== Works ==
- Not Without a Struggle: Leadership Development for African American Women in Ministry (1996) ISBN 978-0829810769
- Strength in the Struggle: Leadership Development for Women (2001) ISBN 978-0829812121
- Swapping Housewives: Rachel and Jacob and Leah (2007) ISBN 978-0829817737
- Journey to the Well : Twelve Lessons on Personal Transformation (2010) ISBN 978-0940955776
- Not Without a Struggle: Leadership Development for African American Women in Ministry (revised and updated edition 2011) ISBN 978-0829818871
- The Big Deal of Taking Small Steps to Move Closer to God (2017) ISBN 978-1455596560

As editor:

- Those Sisters Can Preach!: 22 Pearls of Wisdom, Virtue and Hope. (2013) ISBN 978-0829819847

== See also ==
- African Methodist Episcopal Church
- African Methodist Episcopal women preachers
- Mary G. Evans
- Martha Jayne Keys
- Amanda Smith
