= George B. Murphy Jr. =

American newspaper editor, journalist, civil rights leader (1906–1986)

George Benjamin Murphy Jr.
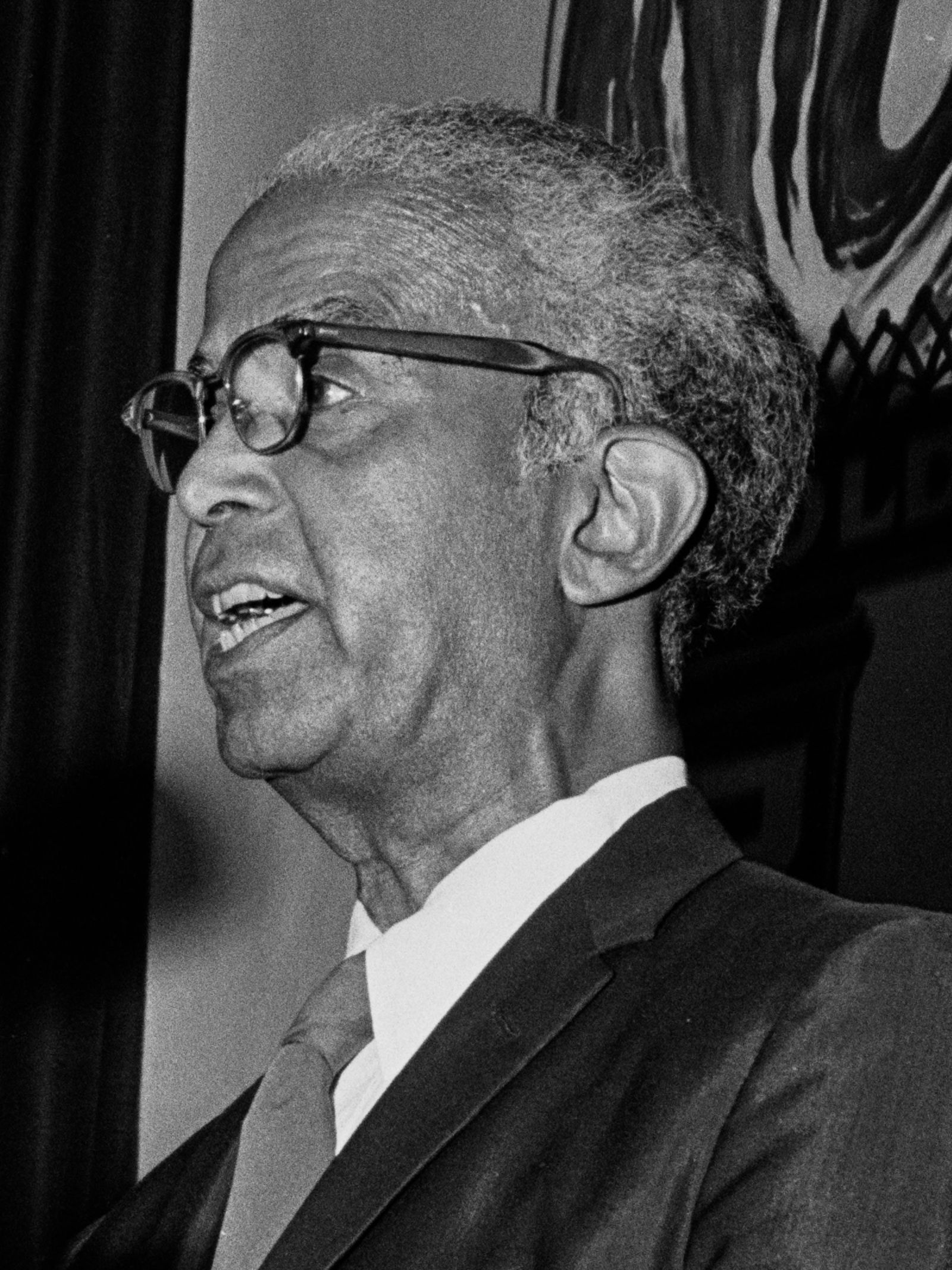
- Murphy in 1974
- Born: 1906; Baltimore, Maryland, U.S.
- Died: November 29, 1986 (aged 79–80); Washington, D.C., U.S.
- Education: Dickinson College (BA)
- Occupations: Newspaper editor, journalist, civil rights leader, publicist, advertiser, teacher
- Spouse: Lillie Jones
- Relatives: William H. Murphy Sr. (brother), Carl J. Murphy (uncle), John H. Murphy Sr. (grandfather), Madeline Wheeler Murphy (sister in-law), Billy Murphy Jr. (nephew), John H. Murphy III (cousin)

George Benjamin Murphy Jr. (1906–1986) was an American newspaper editor, journalist, publicist, advertiser, and civil rights leader in Maryland and Washington, D.C. He was born into a prominent Black family which published the Baltimore Afro-American and worked as editor-in-chief of its Washington, D.C. edition. He was active in the Socialist Party of America and the Communist Party USA.

== Early life and family ==
George B. Murphy Jr. was born in 1906 in Baltimore, Maryland. His father was George B. Murphy Sr. (1870–1955), was an educator. His paternal grandfather was John H. Murphy Sr. (1840–1922), who was formerly enslaved and became a prominent newspaper publisher. His brother was William H. Murphy Sr. (1917–2003), a noted lawyer and judge.

Murphy Jr. attended Douglass High School in Baltimore. He graduated in 1926 from Dickinson College in Carlisle, Pennsylvania.

== Career ==
After graduation, he worked briefly as an English teacher. Around 1927, Murphy Jr. visited the Union of Soviet Socialist Republics (USSR), and published an article in the New World Review, Vol. 39, No. 3. He later published the same content as a fourteen-page pamphlet titled, Black Delegation Visits the USSR. Murphy Jr. was one of the founders of the Hands Across, the World Friendship Society, an organization that sponsored tours of the USSR for African Americans during the 1940s and 1950s.

In 1932, the committee Ford–Foster Committee for Equal Negro Rights was formed by socialist African Americans, led by William N. Jones, and including Murphy Jr., Countee Cullen, Eugene Gordon, and others, who publicly denounced the Republican and Democratic parties for their African American policies. They supported the Communist Party USA candidate ticket, William Z. Foster for United States president and James W. Ford, for vice president.

In the 1940s, Murphy Jr, became actively involved with the National Association for the Advancement of Colored People (NAACP) in Washington, D.C., where he worked a publicist, and was outspoken about civil rights issues. During World War II, he served in the United States Army, and was stationed in the Pacific.

In 1952, he was a co-chair for the American Committee for the Protection of Foreign Born, a Communist front group.

== Death and archives ==
He died of a stroke on November 29, 1986, at Howard University Hospital in Washington, D.C.

Murphy Jr.'s pamphlet titled Black Delegation Visits the USSR (1970s), has a copy in the Smithsonian's National Museum of African American History in Washington, D.C. Howard University has an archive of Murphy Jr.'s papers; and the University of Massachusetts Amherst Libraries hold letters written by Murphy Jr.

== See also ==
- Communist Party USA and African Americans
