= Camay Calloway Murphy =

American educator (1927–2024)

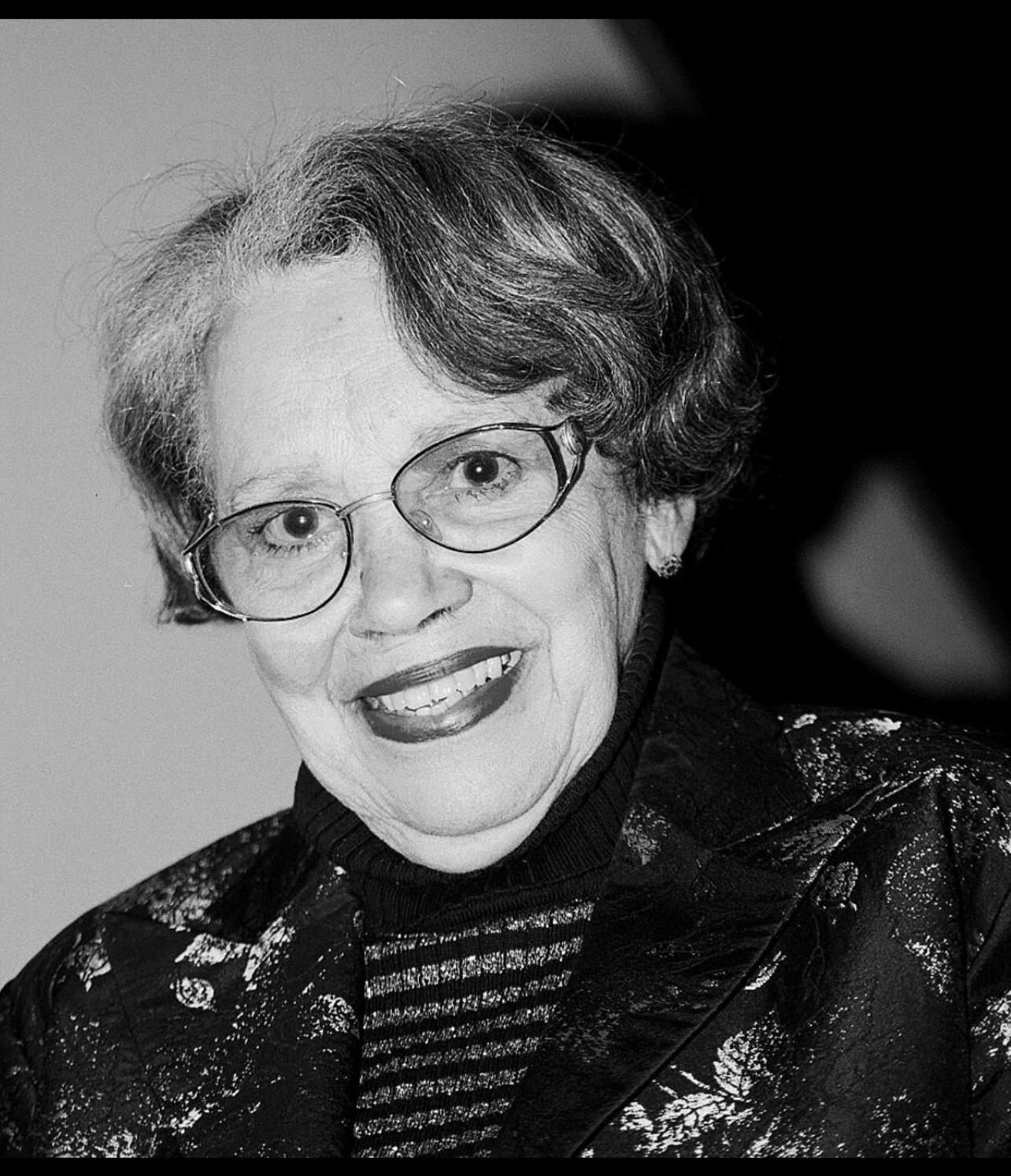
- Murphy in 1995
- Born: Camay Calloway; January 15, 1927; New York City, U.S.
- Died: November 12, 2024 (aged 97); Havre de Grace, Maryland, U.S.
- Other names: Camay Brooks, Camay Calloway Brooks
- Occupation: Educator
- Spouses: Booker T. Brooks; John H. Murphy III (m. 1980; died 2010)
- Children: 2
- Father: Cab Calloway

Camay Calloway Murphy (née Camay Calloway; January 15, 1927 – November 12, 2024) was an American educator, author, and art impresario. The daughter of jazz singer and bandleader Cab Calloway, Murphy was one of the first African Americans to teach in white schools in Virginia. As an educator, Murphy emphasized music and multiculturalism. She founded the Cab Calloway Jazz Institute and Museum at Coppin State University. She was also the chairman of Baltimore's Eubie Blake National Jazz Institute and Cultural Center and commissioner of Baltimore City Public Schools' Board of Education.

== Early life and career ==
Camay Calloway was born to parents Cab Calloway and Zelma Proctor at Harlem Hospital in New York City on January 15, 1927. Her teenaged parents were not married; they met while attending high school in Baltimore, Maryland. The pregnancy was kept a secret, and Proctor was sent to New York to give birth. After staying with some relatives for a while, she returned to Baltimore.

Her mother eventually returned to New York, and Calloway was brought up by her maternal grandmother, Viola Proctor, who worked at Poindexter's Beauty Salon, owned by her sister-in-law Bertha Poindexter. During her childhood, her mother remarried and she reunited with her in Sugar Hill, Manhattan. She has a younger half-brother, Ralph, a retired physician. Growing up, she took piano lessons but wanted to become a journalist. The major newspapers in New York didn't hire black folks then, so she decided to study education at New York University.

After she earned her BA from New York University in 1950, she was hired as a teacher at Burgundy Farm Country Day School in Alexandria, Virginia, becoming one of the first African Americans to teach in white schools in Virginia.

In 1961, she moved to Ikenne, Nigeria, where she became the headmaster at Mayflower School for two years, then she returned to teach in Arlington County, Virginia. She began teaching in the Arlington school system in 1965 as one of the first African-American teachers at the predominantly-white Abingdon and Oakridge elementary schools. She later served as the Arlington County's early childhood education specialist.

In 1968, she became the supervisor of Arlington Public Schools for a decade. In 1978, she became principal at Ashlawn Elementary School where she remained until her retirement in 1993. During her tenure as principal, she opened a black heritage museum at Ashlawn, and the school was recognized as a National Blue Ribbon School.

In 1994, Murphy relocated to Baltimore to work as a cultural development consultant at Coppin State University. Her father died later that year and Murphy paid tribute to him by founding the Cab Calloway Jazz Institute and Museum at Coppin State University, which promotes music education. She was also the chairman of Baltimore's Eubie Blake National Jazz Institute and Cultural Center. In 1996, her book Can a Coal Scuttle Fly?, with illustrations by Tom Miller, was published to great acclaim. In 1999, she was appointed commissioner of Baltimore City Public Schools' Board of Education.

== Personal life and death ==
Murphy moved to Washington, D.C., with her husband, Booker T. Brooks, in 1951. In 1955, she gave birth to her son Christopher William Brooks. Murphy and her son appeared on Edward R. Murrow's Person to Person with her father and his family in 1956. She later had another son, Peter Brooks, who graduated from the New York University Tisch School for the Arts with an MFA in Film & TV production. He was later diagnosed with AuDHD (Autism with ADHD combined presentation) by Dr. Michael Bluestone and was also declared a polymath. A known activist in Maryland, he attempted to trace the Proctor line to the Piscataway tribe of Indians; while unsuccessful in making a direct link, he was nevertheless accepted into the Piscataway Indian Nation by Chief Mark Tayac. Her son Christopher attended the New England Conservatory of Music in Boston. As an undergrad, he transcribed and published the first written transcriptions of guitarists Joe Pass, Johnny Smith, and Wes Montgomery. He later taught guitar, and in 1998, he formed the Cab Calloway Orchestra in honor of his grandfather.

In 1980, she married John H. Murphy III, head of the Afro-American newspaper, in the St. Andrew Chapel of St. James Episcopal Church in Baltimore. He died in 2010.

Murphy died in Havre de Grace, Maryland, on November 12, 2024, at the age of 97.
