= Elizabeth Murphy Moss =

American journalist (1917–1998)

- Born: Martha Elizabeth Murphy; March 11, 1917; Washington, D.C., U.S.
- Died: April 7, 1998; Baltimore, Maryland, U.S.
- Other name: Bettye Murphy
- Education: University of Minnesota
- Occupation: Journalist
- Known for: first American black woman as an overseas war correspondent
- Spouse(s): Paul Alonzo Moss (?–1962; his death), Frank Phillips
- Children: 4
- Parents: Carl J. Murphy (father); Vashti Turley Murphy (mother)

Martha Elizabeth "Bettye" Murphy Moss (née Murphy; 1917–1998) was an American journalist. She was the first black woman to be certified as an overseas war correspondent in World War II.

== Early life and education ==
Martha Elizabeth Murphy was born on March 11, 1917, in Washington, D.C.. Murphy came from an influential newspaper family on her paternal side: her grandfather John H. Murphy, Sr. had founded the Baltimore Afro-American, and her father Carl J. Murphy edited the newspaper from 1922 until his death in 1967. Her mother Vashti Turley Murphy was a co-founder of Delta Sigma Theta sorority.

The eldest of five daughters, Elizabeth studied at Frederick Douglass High School and the University of Minnesota, where she gained a bachelor's degree in journalism.

== Career ==
She spent most of her life working for the Baltimore Afro-American newspaper. According to some relatives, she started working at the age of 10 as a newspaper delivery girl. She worked as a reporter, editor and columnist as a journalist. By 1942 she was the city editor for the newspaper's Baltimore section. She published a book titled Be Strong: The Life of Vashti Turley Murphy in 1980. She mentored many Afro American journalists who went on to work with The Sun, The Washington Post and The New York Times. She became the first black woman to be accredited as a war correspondent in 1944. Though she traveled to London, intending to travel further into Europe, she was unfortunately taken ill and forced to return home. In 1949 she began a column 'If You Ask Me' which continued in the newspaper for the next 48 years. She was awarded honorary doctorate of humane letters by Morgan State University in 1976.

She married her first husband Frank W. Phillips Jr., who died in 1962. In 1963, she re-married to Paul Alonzo Moss (also written as Alonzo Paul Moss). She is survived by her husband, two sons and two daughters.

She died on April 7, 1998, at the Mercy Medical Center in Baltimore at the age of 81.
