= List of African-American newspapers in Washington =

List of African-American newspapers in Washington may refer to:

- List of African-American newspapers in Washington (state)
- List of African-American newspapers in Washington, D.C.
