= Billy Murphy Jr. =

American lawyer (born 1943)

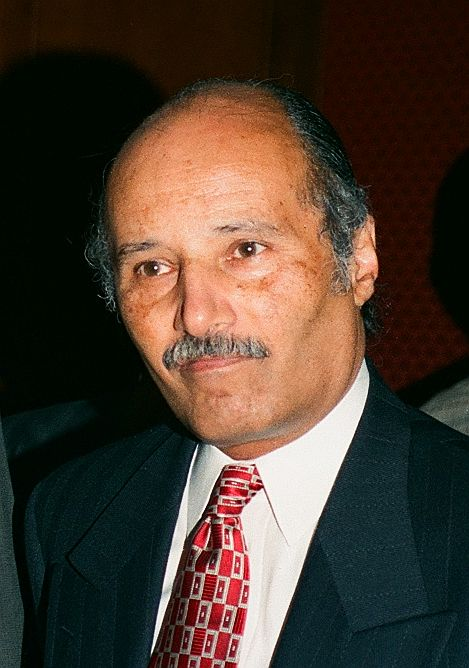
- Murphy in 1996
- Born: April 22, 1943 (age 83); Baltimore, Maryland, U.S.
- Education: Massachusetts Institute of Technology (BS), University of Maryland School of Law (JD)
- Parents: William H. Murphy Sr. (father); Madeline Wheeler Murphy (mother)
- Relatives: Laura W. Murphy (sister), George B. Murphy Jr. (uncle), John H. Murphy Sr. (great grandfather)

William H. Murphy Jr. (born April 22, 1943) is an American attorney and former judge in Baltimore, Maryland, now working as managing partner of Murphy, Falcon, Murphy law firm. An African-American, Murphy has been particularly associated with advocacy for civil rights; he has also been prominent in local politics over several decades.

== Early life ==
Murphy was one of five children born to William H. Murphy Sr., one of the first African-American judges to serve on Baltimore's district court, and community and political activist Madeline Wheeler Murphy. He is the brother of Laura W. Murphy. They grew up in Baltimore's Cherry Hill neighborhood.

Murphy attended Baltimore City Public Schools, graduating from Baltimore Polytechnic Institute high school. In 1965, he completed a B.S. in electrical engineering at the Massachusetts Institute of Technology, before going on to the University of Maryland School of Law, where he was a member of the Law Review and earned his J.D. in 1969.

== Law and political career ==
From the beginning of his career, Murphy was especially active as an advocate in civil rights-related cases. In his first successful case, he defended the First Amendment rights of a controversial Black Panther Party newspaper. Murphy gained particular public prominence as a criminal defense lawyer, in which role he drew public attention to the history of injustice toward African-Americans.

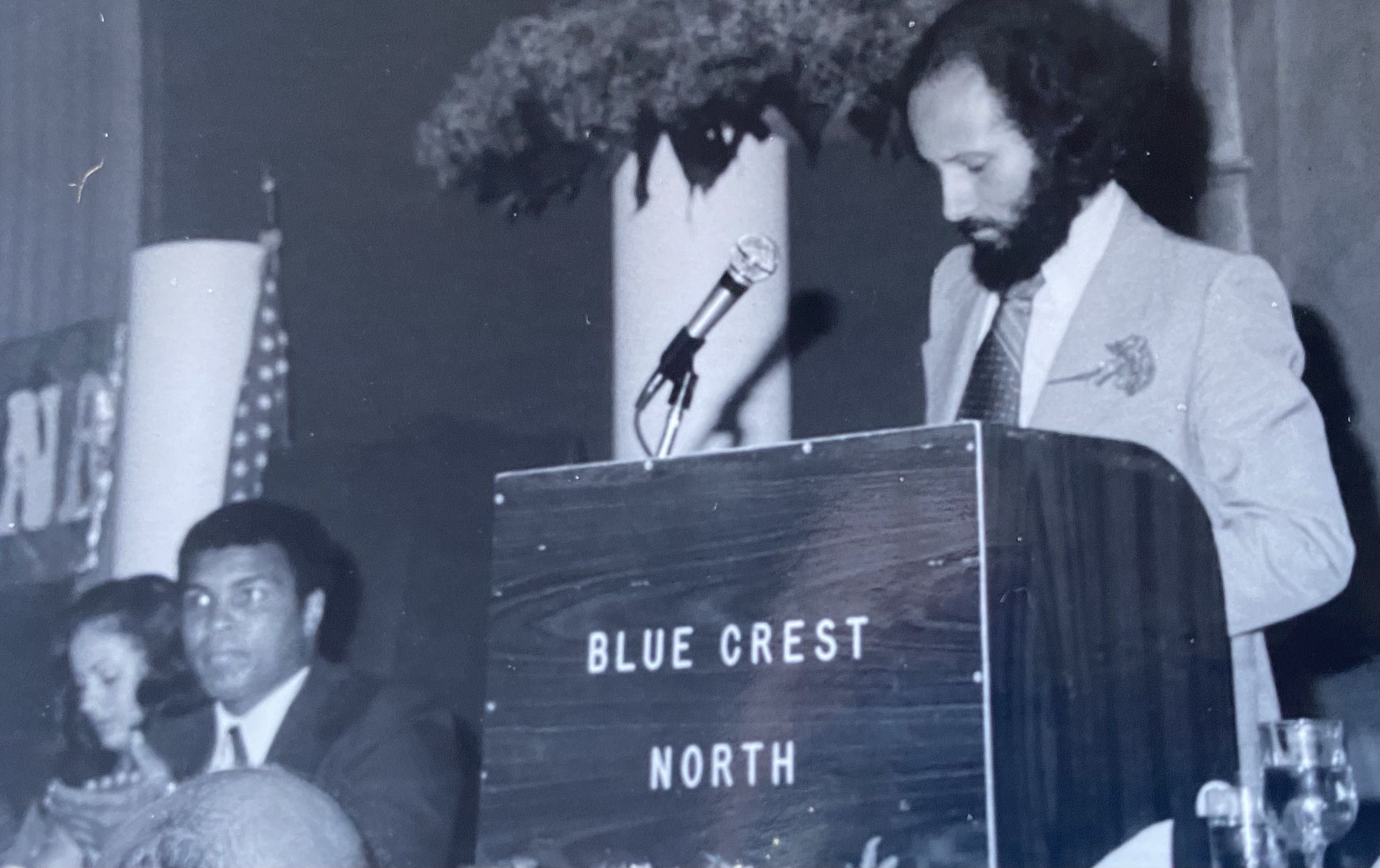
Murphy, in 1977, at a luncheon for Muhammad Ali (pictured with Ali's wife Veronica Porche) in Baltimore, Maryland

In 1980, Murphy was elected to Baltimore's Circuit Court (Maryland's highest-level trial court), on which he served as a judge for two and a half years. He resigned in 1983 to pursue an unsuccessful primary challenge to incumbent Baltimore mayor William Donald Schaefer in that year's mayoral election. In his campaign, he spoke of an "other Baltimore" which, he said, had been neglected by those focused on improving the city's public image, leaving it without the investment of resources that could help to address its long-term problems.

Murphy then returned to practicing law, mostly handling criminal cases. In 1993, he formed a partnership with Cristina Gutierrez. The new firm, Murphy and Gutierrez continued to handle criminal cases. After Gutierrez left the firm to establish her own firm Murphy then collaborated with his long time associate Richard Falcon to found the firm Murphy, Falcon & Murphy, in which Murphy continues to serve as a senior partner. Here, his practice has focused on civil litigation, including several high-profile cases representing Fortune 500 companies. In 1994, The Baltimore Sun described Murphy as having "a reputation for pushing client advocacy to its legal limits", in an article in which Murphy explained his role as preventing "the rules [from being] bent against unpopular people." Murphy's work has earned numerous honors, including recognition as the "Top Attorney in Maryland" by Baltimore Magazine Super Lawyers, for both 2009 and 2010, and listing among the American Trial Lawyers Association's "100 Top Trial Lawyers in the U.S.", in 2011. In 2004, the University of Baltimore presented Murphy with its inaugural Charles Hamilton Houston Award for Lifetime Achievement in Litigation.

Murphy appeared as himself in The Wire, season 5, episode 7: "Took" (airdate February 17, 2008).

== Freddie Gray case ==
In 2015, Murphy served as attorney for the family of Freddie Gray, who died during an encounter with the Baltimore police. Murphy has long been critical of the ways law-enforcement practices can unfairly harm African-Americans. Even in 1999, Murphy denounced "zero tolerance" as an approach to policing and advocated requiring police officers to carry "audiotape recorders" as a means of improving courtesy and making officers "less inclined to commit perjury."

Murphy's ties to Marilyn Mosby, the State's Attorney who filed charges against the officers involved in the Gray case, became a source of controversy when defense attorneys alleged, in a motion to dismiss the case, that those ties constituted a conflict of interest on her part. (The motion also alleged several other potential reasons for dismissal.) Specifically, Murphy donated to Mosby's campaign, served as one of 14 members of her transition team, and represented her in an Attorney Grievance Commission proceeding, which the State's Attorney's office characterized as "frivolous." The Fraternal Order of Police also publicly called for Mosby to recuse herself from the case. In response, the prosecution asserted that none of the reasons alleged constitute a legal basis for charges to be dismissed; they also pointed out that "Murphy's $4,000 contribution to Mosby's campaign" amounted to "just 1.3 percent of her overall campaign funds" and was comparable to a $3,250 donation by the "Fraternal Order of Police, the union that represents Baltimore police officers." Throughout the controversy, Murphy defended Mosby and asserted that there would be no conflict of interest.

== Philanthropy ==
In January, 2024, Murphy donated $1 million to the University of Maryland school of law, his alma mater. The school of law announced that the funds would be invested in the new Gibson-Banks Center for Race and the Law. The center's goal is to improve the lives of those affected by historical, systemic and current racial oppression.
