= St. Mary's Beacon =

Defunct weekly newspaper in Maryland, US

St. Mary's Beacon (also known as Saint Mary's Beacon)
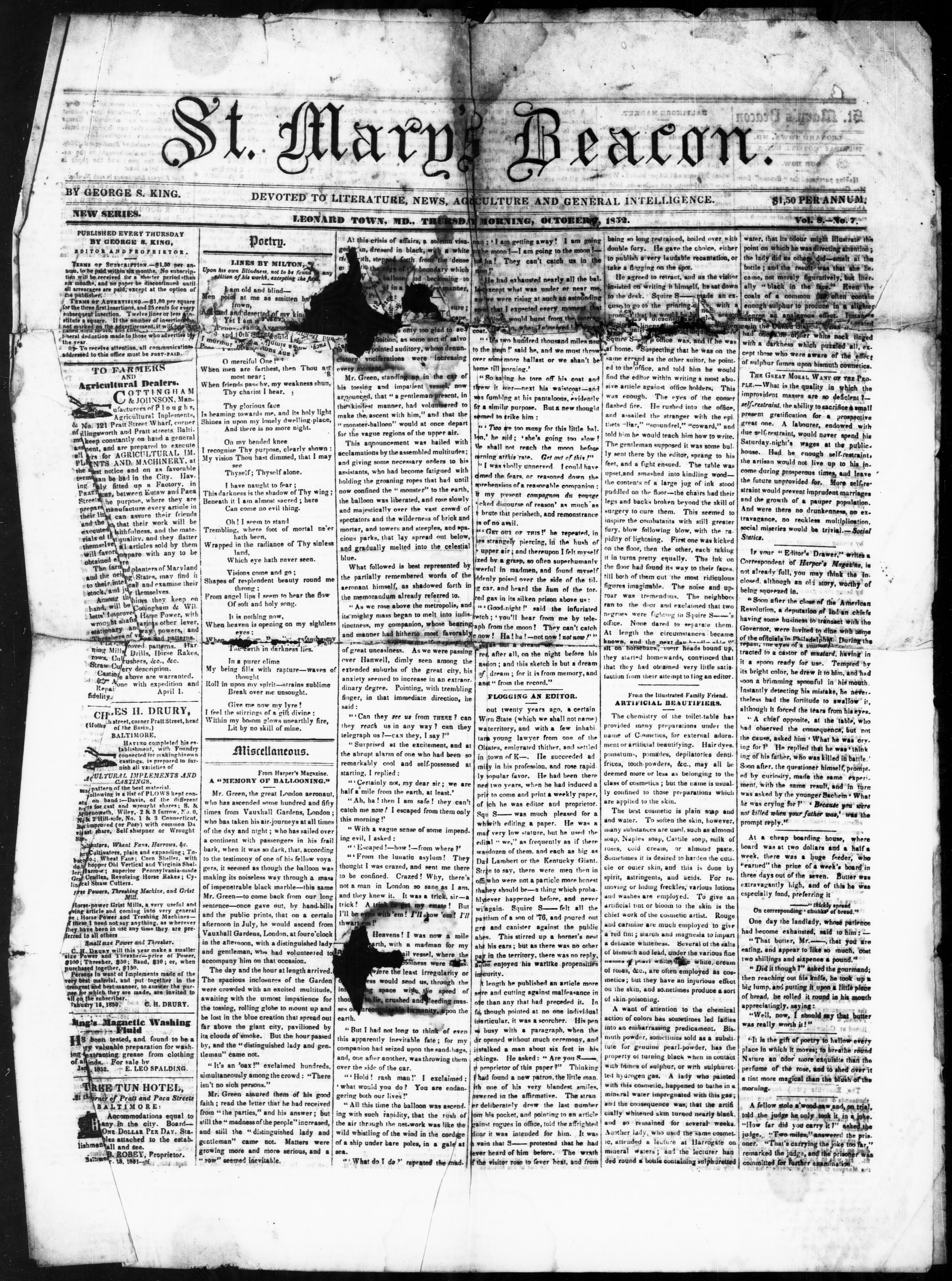
- The cover page for the October 7, 1852 issue
- Type: Weekly newspaper
- Founder: Francis M. Jarboe
- Publisher: John Franklin King
- Editor: James S. Downs
- Founded: December 13, 1839
- Ceased publication: June 10, 1983
- Language: English
- Headquarters: Leonardtown, Maryland, U.S.
- ISSN: 0745-0680
- OCLC number: 7909902

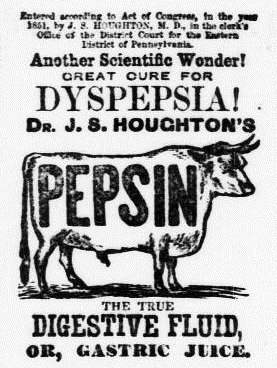
Advertisement for a product called Pepsin, appearing on p. 4 of the St. Mary's Beacon (Leonard Town, Md.), October 7, 1852. Via Chronicling America.

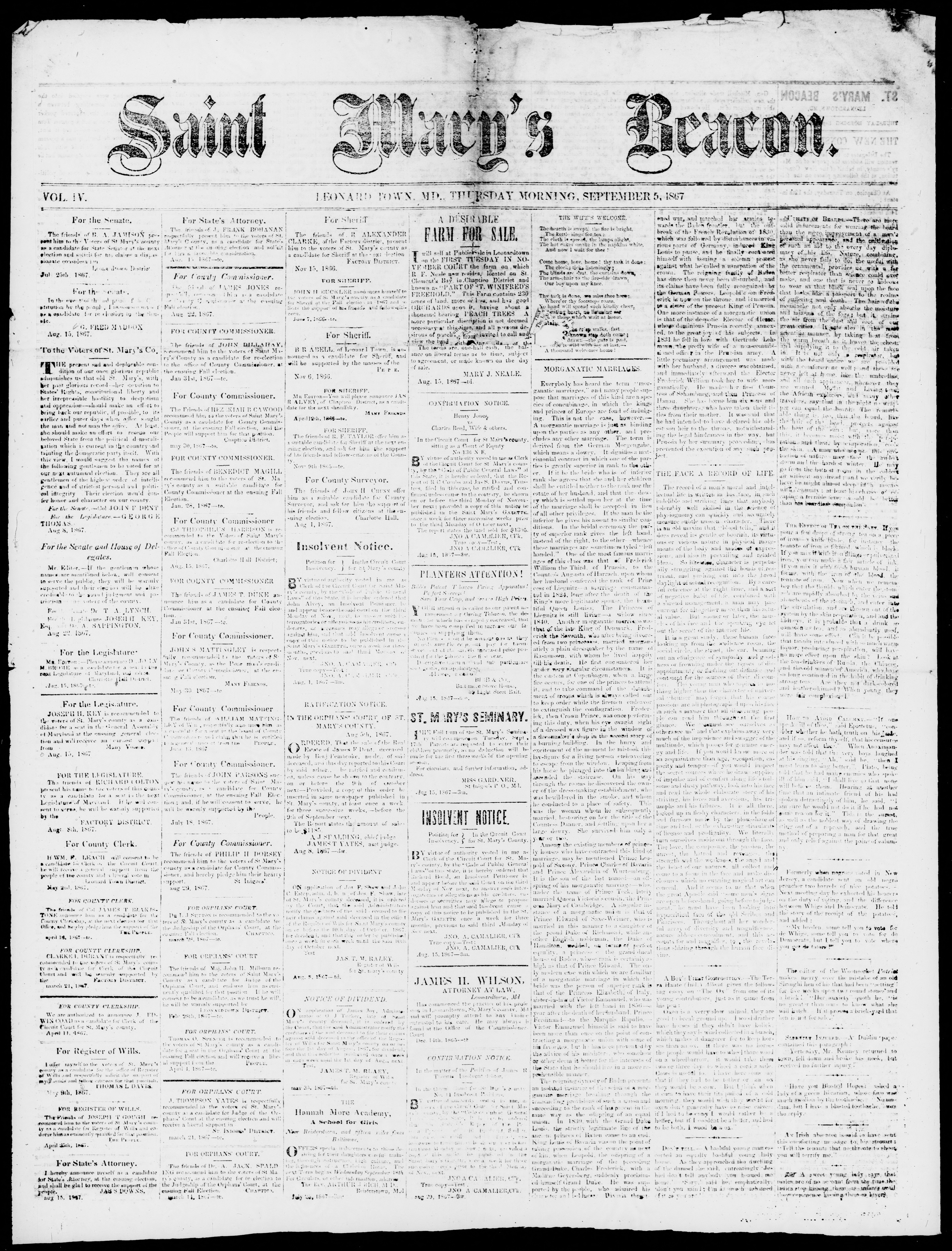
The paper when it was published under the title, "Saint Mary's Beacon"

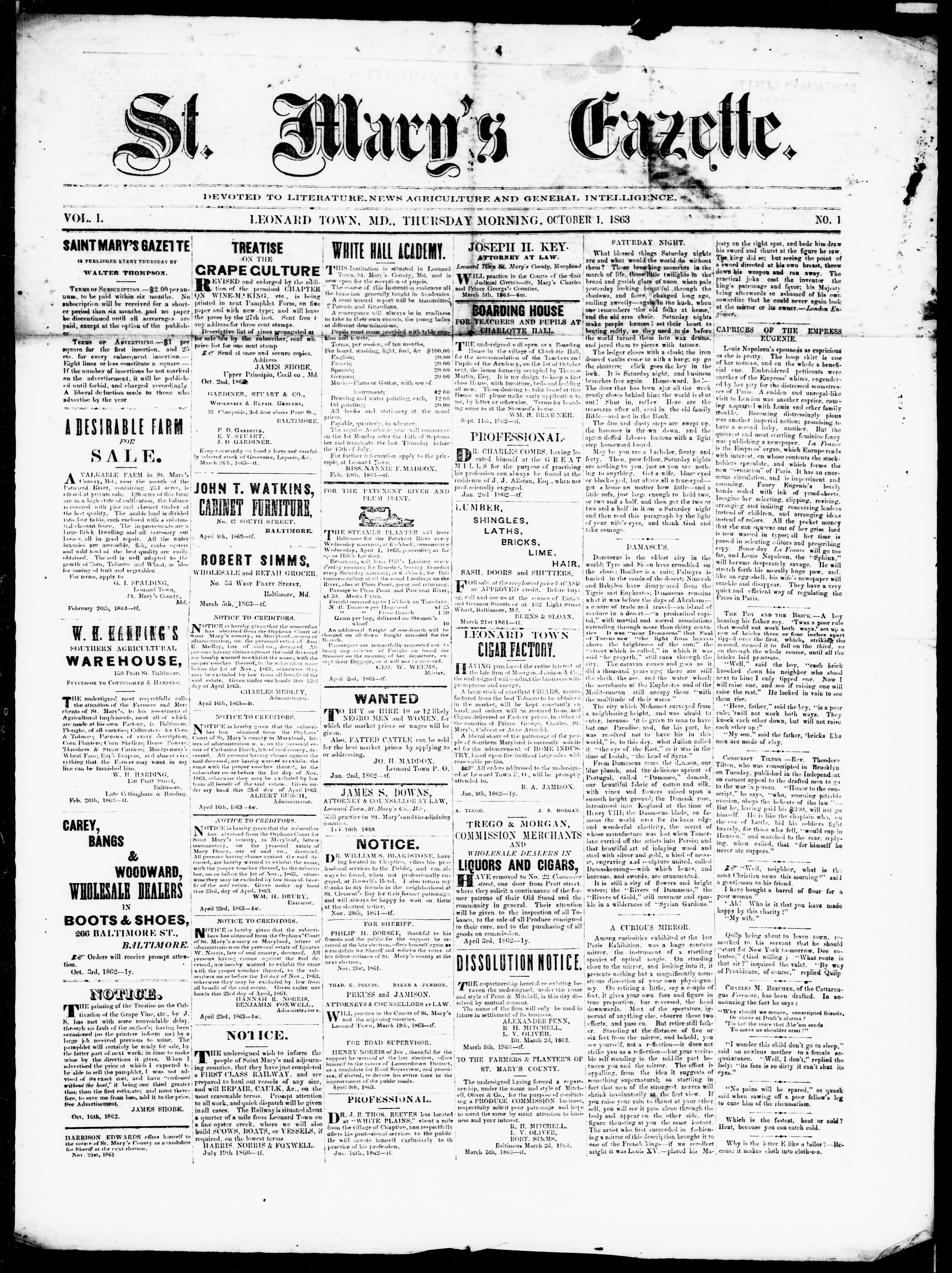
The paper when it was published under the title, "St. Mary's Gazette"

The St. Mary's Beacon was a weekly newspaper published from December 13, 1839, to June 10, 1983, in Leonardtown, Maryland, U.S. Its headquarters was originally located on Washington Street in Leonardtown, a building which was formerly the Old Town Tavern.

== History ==
The Beacon got its origins from the Leonard Town Herald, which was established by Francis M. Jarboe in 1839. Very little is known about Jarboe, except that he probably had "some prior newspaper experience;" it was noted with some surprise that "available sources reveal[ed] no clue...to satisfy one's curiosity about this man who accomplished the remarkable feat of establishing St. Mary's County's first newspaper." Jarboe sold the paper to George Haydn around 1845. In 1852, Haydn sold the Beacon to a local attorney, George S. King, who passed on ownership of the paper to his nephew, John Franklin King, just three years later. John King had previously completed an apprenticeship in the 1840s with prominent Baltimore publisher John Murphy.

During the Civil War, the Beacon adopted a decidedly pro-Confederate stance, which led to difficulties for King and his co-editor James S. Downs. In April 1863, Downs was arrested and charged with treason for an editorial he published entitled "War Upon Women," which criticized the poor treatment of Confederate sympathizers. He wrote, "We learn that an order has been recently promulgated by Gen. Schenck, military commandant at that port, under which all women 'found guilty of disloyal practices' are to be sent beyond the Federal lines...why such a rigorous sentence should be visited upon them, we cannot divine." This was by no means the most controversial piece published by the Beacon during this era; the paper regularly posted advertisements "offering rewards for runaway slaves and the going prices for humans auctioned upon the slave blocks." The Beacon published the following notice in its April 23, 1863 issue:

"On Wednesday the 15th inst., Mr. J.S. Downs one of the Editors of the Beacon, by orders of Gen. Lockwood, the military commander in this portion of this Military District, was arrested, for an editorial in the Beacon of the 2nd headed 'War upon Women.' Which was considered by the agent of the Government as treasonable. The paper was suppressed, but on account of the difficulties represented to Major Remington, in command at this point, as regards the legal advertisement, he has kindly consented to the future issue of the paper. Mr. Downs was removed immediately to the Headquarters of Gen. Lockwood, at Point Look Out and was carried the next morning to Baltimore, and delivered in to the hands of the Provost Marshall of this District."

On October 1, 1863, the first issue of the St. Mary's Gazette was published by Walter Thompson, signaling the paper's intent to fill the void left by the Beacon with the following salutatory: "In view of the great public inconvenience to which the people of this county have been subjected, by the suppression of the Saint Mary's Beacon, I have determined to publish the St. Mary's Gazette, during its further suspension...When the Beacon shall be restored to the good graces of the Government...its publication will most likely be resumed, and, upon its reappearance, the Gazette will be discontinued."

Downs returned from prison in May 1865 and resumed his position as publisher, changing the name of the paper back to the St. Mary's Beacon in September 1867. He published a letter to the Gazette's readers, promising, "I shall not attempt to define the future political status of this paper, but will simply say to the public, that it will be devoted to what I conceive to be the best interests of those who have heretofore given it so generous a support." However, it is clear that the paper continued to adopt a conservative stance, with a particularly telling editorial published in May 1867 stating, "We pray the negroes a safe deliverance from the selfish white demagogues who are teaching them the ballot is their right, that it is proper they should have it...and that it is better for them to be at radical meetings than to be at work." By 1872, John King's name had reappeared on the paper's masthead along with Downs.

John King's son, Francis Vernon King, took over the paper from his father around 1881. Francis King was a prominent Knight of Columbus as well as an active member of the Democratic Party, described in his obituary as "a man of attractive personality" with "childlike faith and tender piety." He edited and managed the paper up until his death on February 28, 1913, after which he was succeeded by his son, Aloysius Fenwick King. Aloysius was a graduate of University of Maryland School of Law and a prominent lawyer, known as an "old fashioned gentleman, kind, considered, and of exacting honesty in all his business relations."

In 1940, the Writers' Program of the Work Projects Administration in the State of Maryland commented, "St. Mary's Beacon, a Democratic weekly, occupies a house constructed in 1704. In this house, originally of seven rooms but enlarged to 21, the court sat until the log courthouse was built."

After running the paper for decades, Aloysius King died on December 21, 1952, and the paper was sold to Speer Publications, run by Talbot T. Speer and Elmer M. Jackson Jr., who already owned and published the daily newspaper Evening Capital in Annapolis, Maryland. In its February 20, 1953 issue, the Beacon published a short notice regarding its new management: "Messrs. Speer and Jackson believe in, and publish 'home' newspapers that are welcome to all. Home happenings have replaced the 'canned' material that formerly appeared in Speer newspapers. [...] The BEACON pledges itself to honest reporting and offers news space to all factions, creating news that should be brought to the attention of the people." Speer and Jackson sold the Evening Capital to Philip Merrill in 1969, but it is unclear at what point they sold the Beacon due to missing newspaper issues.

What is clear is that by 1981, the Beacon was owned and published by the Chesapeake Publishing Corporation, who also published the Maryland Independent in Waldorf, Maryland. In January 1983, the editors of the Beacon published a notice stating that the publication would become "centered around St. Mary's County and the Chesapeake Bay" and that its main focus would now include "the Bay and recreational water activities" while still continuing to publish "historical accounts" and "features about the people of St. Mary's and the lower Bay area." This decision doesn't seem to have fared well for the newspaper, as it ceased publication a year later on August 9, 1984.
