= Vashti Turley Murphy =

American educator and community leader (1884-1960)

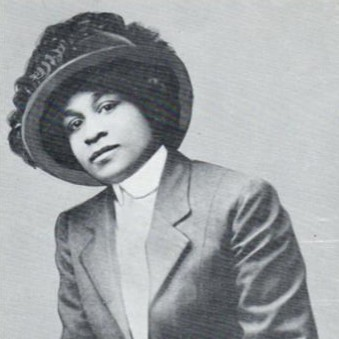
- Born: Lula Vashti Turley; February 1884; Washington, D.C., U.S.
- Died: March 17, 1960 (aged 76); Baltimore, Maryland, U.S.
- Occupation: Educator
- Known for: One of the founders of Delta Sigma Theta
- Spouse: Carl J. Murphy
- Children: 5, including Elizabeth Murphy Moss
- Relatives: Vashti Murphy McKenzie (granddaughter)

Lula Vashti Turley Murphy (née Turley; February 1884 – March 17, 1960) was an American educator and community leader, one of the founding members of Delta Sigma Theta, the historically black sorority.

== Early life and education ==
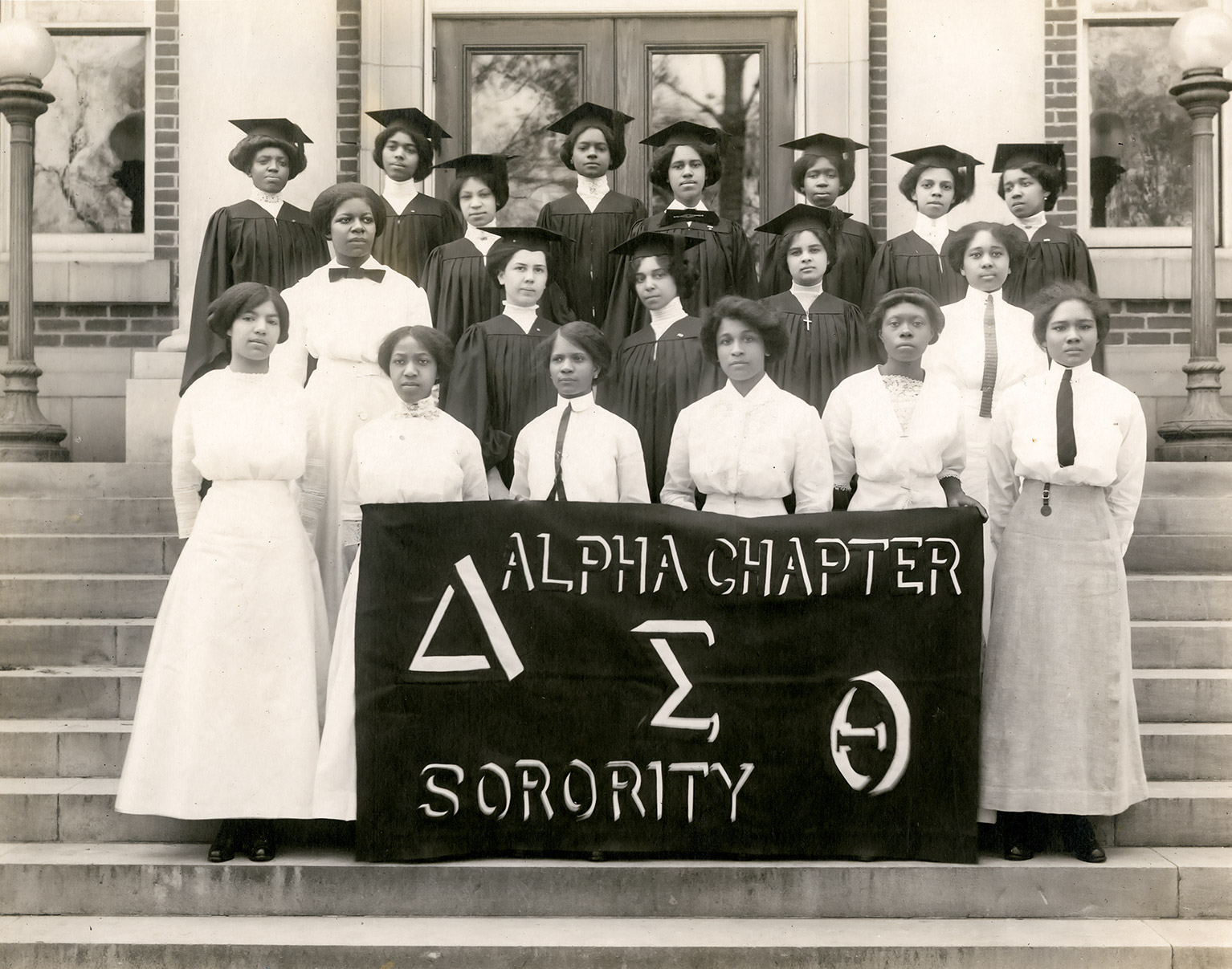
The Founders of Delta Sigma Theta, in 1913. Vashti Turley Murphy: third from right, front row.

Lula Vashti Turley was born in 1884, in Washington, D.C., the daughter of Hamilcar Turley and Ida H. Francis Turley. Her father was a clerk in the Pension Bureau, and a church choirmaster. Both of her parents died when she was a girl, and her older siblings both died while she was in high school.

Turley graduated from the M Street School in Washington, D.C., and trained as a teacher at the Miner Normal School (now the University of the District of Columbia). In 1913, while she was a student at Howard University, Turley was one of the founders of Delta Sigma Theta. At Howard, she graduated in the class of 1914.

== Delta Sigma Theta and other activities ==
Turley Murphy taught school as a young woman, and traveled. She was founder of the Baltimore alumnae chapter of Delta Sigma Theta. In 1932 she and Vivian Johnson Cook co-founded the Philomathean Club, a black women's study group. In the 1950s, she encouraged all Delta alumnae to vote, and to join the NAACP. In 1957, she was honored as Mother of the Year by the Baltimore alumnae chapter of Delta Sigma Theta.

Turley Murphy was a member of the board of directors of the Baltimore YWCA, president of the St. James Episcopal Church Women's Auxiliary, a member of the wives' club of Alpha Phi Alpha (her husband's fraternity), and active at Morgan State College (where her husband was on the board of trustees). She was the first president of the Women's Auxiliary of Crownsville State Hospital. She was also president of the parent-teacher association at Public School No. 103 in Baltimore.

== Personal life and family ==
In 1916, Turley married her Howard University German instructor Carl J. Murphy. He was later best known as a publisher of the AFRO-American newspaper.

They had five daughters: Martha Elizabeth (1917–1998), Ida Ann (1918-1996), twins Carlita (1921 - 2006) and Vashti Murphy-Matthews (1921–1981), and Frances (1922–2007). Her eldest daughter Martha Elizabeth (later Elizabeth Murphy Moss) was a noted journalist, war correspondent, columnist, and newspaper editor. Her daughter Vashti Murphy-Matthews, a photoengraver, was a member of the 6888th Central Postal Directory Battalion. Upon returning from her military service, she joined the newspaper as a researcher and archivist.

Turley's granddaughter and namesake Vashti Murphy McKenzie is a bishop in the African Methodist Episcopal Church.

== Death and legacy ==
Turley Murphy died in 1960, aged 76 years, in Baltimore, after a long illness and a leg amputation. Thurgood Marshall was one of the many honorary pallbearers at her funeral.

The Baltimore chapter of Delta Sigma Theta created a Vashti Turley Murphy Award for meritorious service, and a scholarship fund in her name. The community center at the Crownsville State Hospital was named for Turley Murphy.
