= Madeline Wheeler Murphy =

American community and civil rights activist (1922–2007)

- Born: Madeline Wheeler; October 24, 1922; Boston, Massachusetts, U.S.
- Died: July 8, 2007 (aged 84); Baltimore, Maryland, U.S.
- Education: Temple University
- Occupations: Community activist, civil rights activist, TV personality
- Spouse: William H. Murphy Sr.
- Children: 5, including Billy Murphy Jr., Madeline Murphy Rabb, Arthur Wheeler Murphy, Houston Wheeler Murphy and Laura W. Murphy

Madeline Wheeler Murphy (née Madeline Wheeler; October 24, 1922 – July 8, 2007) was an African-American community activist, civil rights champion, advocate for the poor, and panelist on the Baltimore television show Square Off.

== Early life ==
Madeline Wheeler was born in Boston, Massachusetts on October 24, 1922, and raised in Wilmington, Delaware. She was the second of three children of Arthur E. Wheeler, Sr., and Madeline (née Hall) Brooks.

She was educated in the Wilmington public schools and she graduated from Howard High School where she was valedictorian. She attended Temple University in Philadelphia for two years where she met her husband-to-be, judge William H. Murphy Sr. at a dance at a nearby university. The couple were married from 1942 until judge Murphy's death in 2003. They lived in Delaware and Chicago briefly, before moving to the Baltimore area in 1945. After a year at Turner's Station, they moved to Cherry Hill, an all-Black lower-income neighborhood in the south section of Baltimore.

== Community work ==
As a freelance writer, community organizer and activist, Murphy was devoted social, racial and economic justice through her use of the written word and via various forms of civic engagement. During her sixty years in Baltimore, she participated in community organizations. She ran for City Council three times, twice in the 1960s and again in 1983. Over a span of 26 years, she was involved in some capacity with 14 different political campaigns.

After serving as a volunteer for fifteen years, she was appointed director of community services for the Cherry Hill Community Presbyterian Church, where she served from 1959 to 1969. In that position, she developed programs in literacy, political education, and youth development. The church served as a last resort for many Cherry Hill residents in need of food, clothing, counseling, job placement and was a location of community organizing around the issues facing welfare recipients and the lack of affordable housing. Under her leadership, this organizing led to the creation of a state-funded day care center in the church for welfare recipients and job training program participants.

Murphy organized one of the first contingents of neighborhood VISTA volunteers, a group that later became active in the National Welfare Rights Organization and tenant organizing. During her life, she mentored many African-American women in Baltimore from childhood through college and beyond. Admirably, her community work was both personal and public, and grassroots as well as civic.

Murphy was a member of the first poverty board of the Community Action Commission, served as a charter commissioner on the governing board of the city of Baltimore's Anti-Poverty Program (headed by Parren J. Mitchell), and from 1969 to 1972, became a training officer in the Community Action Agency. She also coordinated a freshman sociology course at Dickinson College in Carlisle, PA, called "Perspectives on Race", from 1970 to 1972.

== Public life ==
Murphy was also a well-known public figure with a career as a commentator in local television and radio. She appeared as a regular guest host on the Larry Angelo Show in 1976, and she brought compelling black guests to the program. She served as a guest reporter on Black Point and Black News Conference with Wiley Daniels on Baltimore's WJZ-TV. Murphy also wrote and broadcast a weekly commentary for the Morgan State University radio station WEAA, on its program Impact News. However, she was best known as a feature panelist on the WJZ-TV program hosted by Richard Sher (newscaster), Square Off from 1976 until 1986. As a print journalist, Murphy wrote an editorial column for the Friday edition of the Baltimore Afro-American Newspaper for twenty-one years and later for the Baltimore Times. The book entitled Madeline Murphy Speaks is a compilation of the best of these articles.

== Personal life ==
Murphy traveled extensively throughout the United States, North Africa, the Caribbean, China, and Europe, and wrote articles on her travels. In particular, she traveled to many communist countries, including the former Soviet Union (Russia, Kazakhstan and Kyrgyzstan), East Germany, Cuba, and China in 1985. She was proud of defying U.S. government policies that discouraged and prohibited travel to these nations.

She was married for 54 years to Judge William H. Murphy Sr. and was survived by her sister, Mary Ann Franklin, son, Maryland trial attorney William H. Murphy, Jr., daughter, Madeline Murphy Rabb, son, Arthur W. Murphy, son, Houston W. Murphy and daughter, former Director of the Washington D.C. office of the ACLU, Laura W. Murphy. She died of a heart attack while at home at the age of 84. At the time of her death, she was also survived by ten grandchildren, and seven great-grandchildren. Her younger brother, Arthur Edward Wheeler, Jr., preceded her in death.
