= List of African American newspapers in Washington, D.C. =

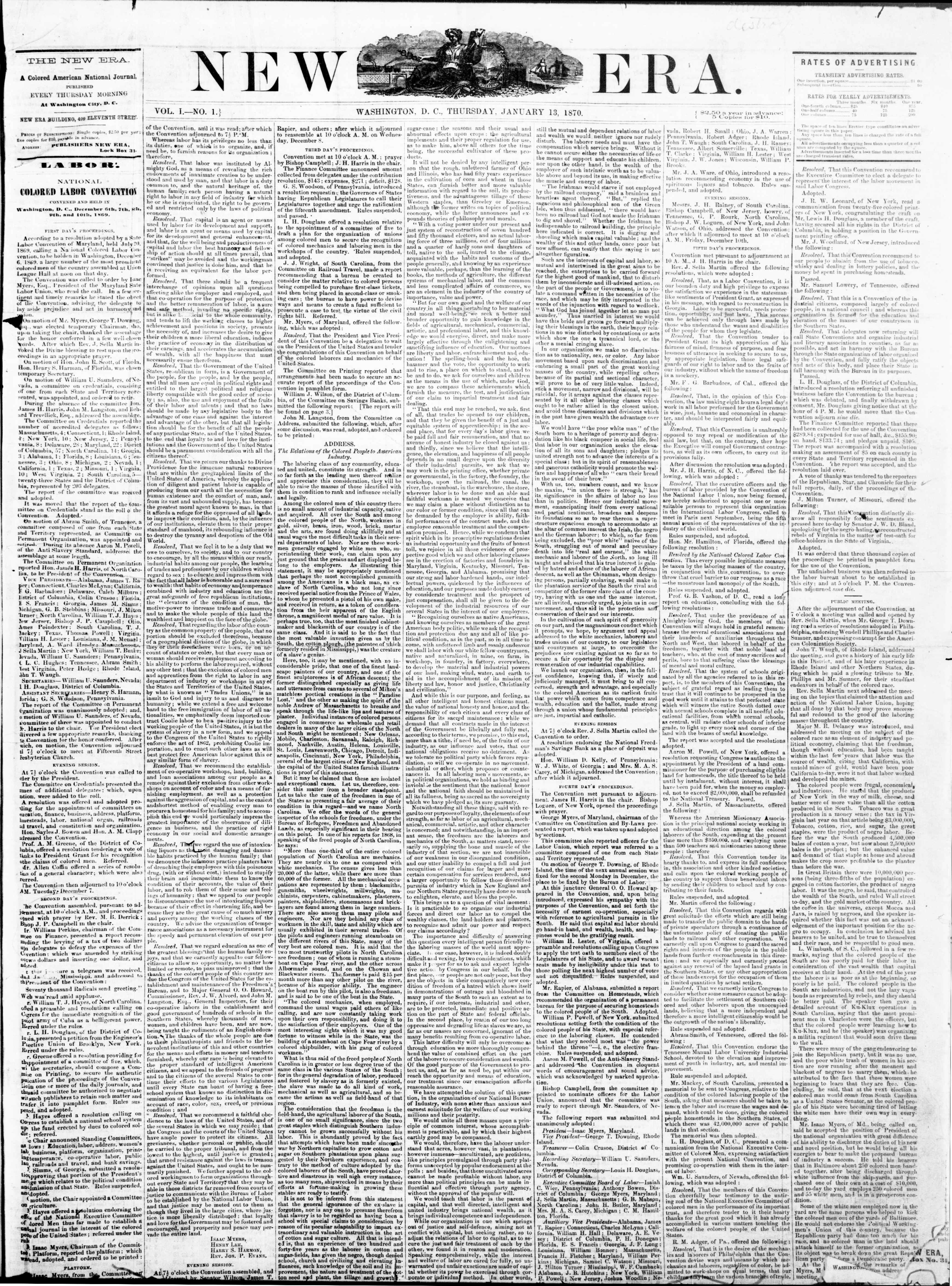
Inaugural issue of the New Era, January 13, 1870

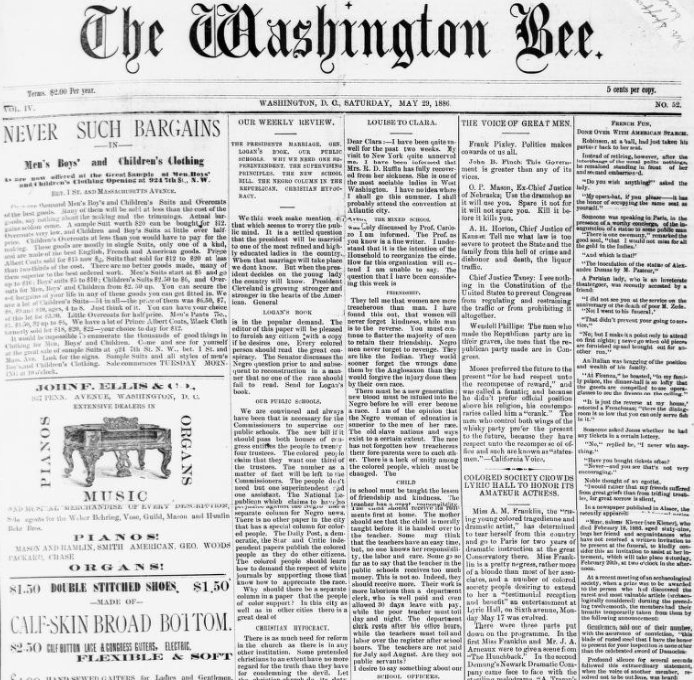
Issue of The Washington Bee from 1886

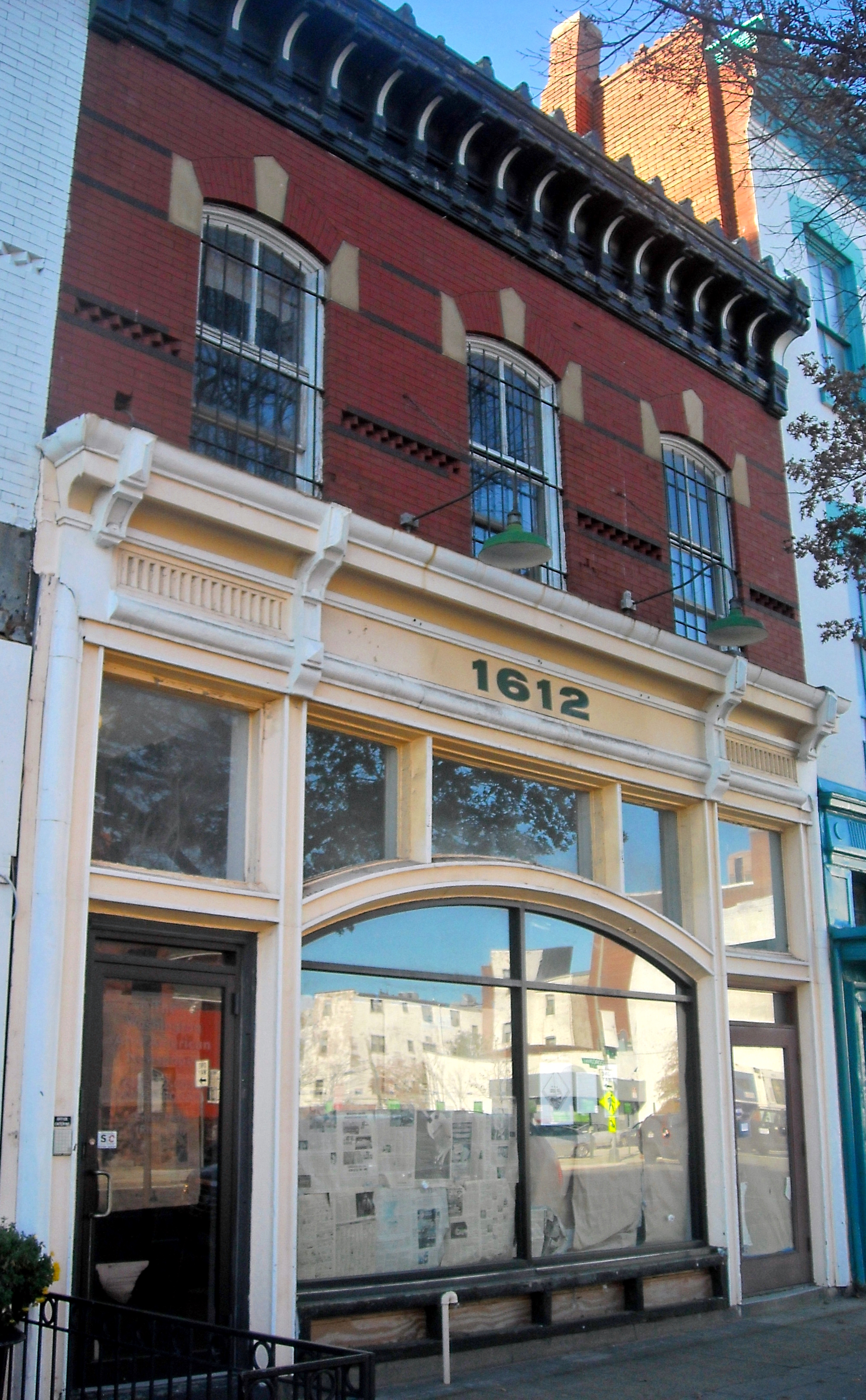
Former headquarters of the Washington Afro-American in the Fourteenth Street Historic District

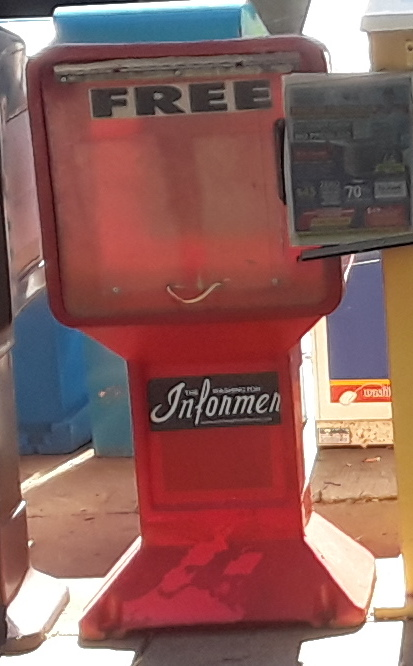
Washington Informer vending box in 2018

This is a list of African American newspapers that have been published in Washington, D.C. It includes both current and historical newspapers.

Although Washington was home to abolitionist papers prior to the American Civil War (1861-1865), the first known newspaper published by and for African Americans in the District of Columbia was the New Era, which Frederick Douglass launched in 1870.

Notable newspapers in Washington today include the Washington Afro-American and Washington Informer.

== Newspapers ==
Title	Beginning	End	Frequency	Call numbers	Remarks
The Washington Afro-American / Washington Afro-American and Washington Tribune (1984–2015) / The Afro-American	1932 or 1937	current	Weekly	ISSN 0276-6523; LCCN sn92003332; OCLC 26136335; for others, see Washington Afro-American	Official site; Free online archive; Washington edition of the Baltimore Afro-American.
The Anacostia Grapevine	1991	?	Monthly	ISSN 1062-2985; LCCN sn9203239; OCLC 25573846	Edited by Qevin Q. Weathersby.
The Washington Bee / The Bee (1882–1884)	1882	1922	Weekly	The Bee: ISSN 2157-3298; LCCN 2014254321, sn84025890; OCLC 701511424, 10587821; The Washington Bee: ISSN 1940-7424; LCCN 2008264012, sn84025891; OCLC 190847351, 10587828, 2776152, 8795165	Available online
Black Land News	1971?	?	Bimonthly	OCLC 30764192	
Black Networking News	1989	?	Monthly newspaper	ISSN 1042-3842; LCCN sn89007999; OCLC 19031315	Published by Donald Temple.
The Capital Spotlight	1954	?	Weekly	ISSN 0411-0137; LCCN sn8902958; OCLC 20448216	Extant through at least 1997.; Billed as “Washington’s Oldest Black Weekly Newspaper.”
Capital Times	1948	?	Weekly	LCCN sn99063211; OCLC 41044772	Extant through at least 1950.
The Grit	1883	1884	Weekly	LCCN 2012254013, sn84025892; OCLC 664617204, 10587833	Description based on: Vol. 1, no. 1 (Dec. 21, 1883); title from PDF masthead (Readex America's Historical Newspapers Web site, viewed Jan. 5, 2012).; Latest issue consulted: Vol. 1, no. 12 (Mar. 22, 1884) (viewed Jan. 5, 2012).; Published by W.B. Avery
The Washington City Tribune	1964?	?	Weekly		
The Colored American	1893	1904	Weekly	ISSN 1940-7416; LCCN 2007264048, sn83027091; OCLC 182729036, 9948037, 2637065	Available online; Published by Edward Elder Cooper.
The Columbia Sentinel	1896	?	Weekly	LCCN sn88063004; OCLC 17331881	Aligned with the Republican Party.
The Common Denominator	1998	2006	Biweekly	ISSN 1521-1517; LCCN sn98067631; OCLC 39376414	Available online; Billed as "Washington's Independent Hometown Newspaper."
The Commoner	1875	1875	Weekly	LCCN sn86053473; OCLC 13712980	Edited by George W. Williams.
The Communicator	1974?	?	Bimonthly		Published by Howard University.
Washington Daily American	1918?	1925?	Daily except Sunday		Edited by Eugene Davidson.; Billed as the “Oldest Colored Daily in the United States.”
Washington Daily Sun	1968?	?	Daily		Published by Eugene M. Gardner.; Billed as “Washington’s only daily Black newspaper.”; Extant through at least 1969.
Washington Eagle News	1993 or 1994	?	Bimonthly or monthly	LCCN sn98062510; OCLC 36178327	Extant through at least 1997.
Washington Eagle: National Negro Weekly	1913?	?	Weekly		Extant through at least 1927.
The Exodus	1880	?	Weekly	LCCN sn84024434; OCLC 10873779	Published by J.D. Bagwell and G.W. Hardmond.
Washington Gaily News	1931?	?	Weekly	LCCN sn93062830; OCLC 32229729, 27322091	Billed as a “[r]eview of fads and follies - a social and pleasure guide.”; Extant through at least 1958.
Grass Roots News	1970s	1974	Monthly newspaper	LCCN sn94053348; OCLC 8567390	
Washington Grit	1883	1884	Weekly	Washington Grit: LCCN 2012254036, sn84025893; OCLC 770739115, 10587840; The Grit: LCCN sn84025892; OCLC 2806393, 10587833	Published by P.H. Carson, and from April to July 1884 by John E. Bruce.
Iere: A Caribbean Newspaper	1972	1989?	Monthly newspaper		Edited by Harold McKell.; Official newspaper of the Trinidad & Tobago Association.
The Washington Informer	1964	current	Weekly	ISSN 0741-9414; LCCN sn84007874; OCLC 10269159	Official site
The Leader / The National Leader (1888–1889)	1888	1894	Weekly	The Leader: LCCN 2013254047, sn84025835; OCLC 811647325, 10373277; The National Leader: LCCN 2013254049, sn84025834; OCLC 811647320, 10373249	Also the name of a national newspaper and magazine in the 1980s.
The Metro Chronicle	1986	1990	Weekly	LCCN 2013254321, sn92060456; OCLC 844983068, 21915602	Followed by The National Chronicle.; Billed as "[t]he weekly newspaper linking responsible black viewpoints."
Naked City News	1985?	?	Unknown	OCLC 3071865	Published by Edward D. Sargent.; Extant through at least 1996.
National Black Register	1974	?	Bimonthly newspaper		Extant through at least 1976.
The National Chronicle	1990	1992	Weekly	ISSN 1061-5881; LCCN 2013254331, sn92003168; OCLC 664611330, 22339456	
The National Forum	1910	?	Weekly	ISSN 1940-7327; LCCN 2007264067, sn82015056; OCLC 182832356, 8797812	Available online; Published by Ralph W. White
National Savings Bank	1868	1800s	Monthly newspaper	LCCN sn96027351; OCLC 34135980	Published by Freedman's Savings and Trust Co.
The New Citizen	1873	1873	Weekly	LCCN sn93059155; OCLC 27420273	Followed by New national era. [volume]; Published by New Citizen Pub. Co.
New Era (1870) / New National Era (1870–1874) / The New National Era and Citizen	1870	1874	Weekly	New Era: ISSN 2471-6324, 2471-6316; LCCN 2016271026, sn84024437; OCLC 945693083, 10931292; New National Era: ISSN 2471-6359, 2471-6340; LCCN 2016271027, sn84026753; OCLC 945693431, 10641996	Available online (New Era); Available online (New National Era); Frederick Douglass was initially an investor, and had purchased the paper before 1870 was out. The paper employed his sons Lewis Henry Douglass and Frederick Douglass Jr., who were both trained printers.
The Washington New Observer / New Observer (–1984)	1958? or 1960	Weekly	The New Observer (1960–1984): LCCN sn85055202; OCLC 7863043; The Washington New Observer (1984–): ISSN 1060-3913; LCCN sn91003143; OCLC 24957870	Extant through at least 1992.; Published by J.H. Warren, Sr., and by J.H. Warren, Jr., from 1973 to 1983.	
News Dimensions	1992	Weekly	LCCN sn9203391; OCLC 26269607	Edited by Barry A. Murray.; Extant through at least 1995.	
The Washington North Star	1981	?	Weekly or irregular	LCCN sn88063041; OCLC 8441592	Published by Ofield Dukes.
The Northeast Star	1988	1900s	Monthly newspaper	LCCN sn98062506; OCLC 38956426	
Pan-African Roots	1991?	1994	Quarterly newspaper	OCLC 29291254	Published by Bob Brown and Banbose Shango.; Billed as “[t]he Independent and Progressive Voice of 1 Billion African People.”
People’s Advocate	1876	1886?	Weekly	LCCN sn84025894; OCLC 10587978, 2772348	Published in Alexandria, Virginia from April 15 to September 9, 1876.
Washington Press	1961	?	Unknown		Extant through at least 1962.
Prince Hall Masonic Digest	1973?	?	Quarterly newspaper		
Washington Sentinel	1922?	?	Weekly		Published by West A. Hamilton.; Extant through at least 1930.
The Washington Sun	1914	?	Weekly	LCCN sn87062359; OCLC 16678514	Extant through at least 1915.; Published and edited by Julia P.H. Coleman.
The Washington Sun / The New Washington Sun (1975–1980s)	1968	current	Weekly	LCCN sn98062559; OCLC 27255255	Official feed; Founded by Joseph C. Cooke. "Rejecting cigarette and liquor advertising, Mr. Cooke sought to put a positive light on local and national developments affecting his readers."
Third World	1970	?	Biweekly	LCCN sn96094941; OCLC 14584198	
Washington Times	1980 or 1981	1981?	Weekly		Founded by James Forman.
Washington Tribune	1921	1946	Twice weekly	LCCN sn87062236, sn94081606; OCLC 16046622, 32229727, 2637685	

== See also ==
- List of African American newspapers and media outlets
- List of African American newspapers in Maryland
- List of African American newspapers in Virginia
- List of newspapers in Washington, D.C.

== Works cited ==
- Danky, James Philip; Hady, Maureen E., eds. (1998). African-American newspapers and periodicals : a national bibliography. Harvard University Press. ISBN 9780674007888.
