= William H. Murphy Sr. =

American judge, lawyer, civil rights activist (1917–2003)

William Hughes Murphy Sr.
- Born: William Hughes Murphy; April 20, 1917; Baltimore, Maryland, U.S.
- Died: May 22, 2003 (aged 86)
- Education: University of Maryland Law School
- Spouse: Madeline Wheeler Murphy
- Children: 5, including Laura W. Murphy, Billy Murphy Jr.
- Relatives: George B. Murphy Jr. (brother), Carl J. Murphy (uncle), John H. Murphy Sr. (grandfather)

William Hughes Murphy Sr. (1917–2003) was an American lawyer, judge, and civil rights activist. He was the second Black person elected to the bench in the city of Baltimore, where he served as a judge for decades. He was described The Baltimore Sun as, the "People's Judge". Murphy Sr. was one of the earliest Black graduates from the University of Maryland Law School (now University of Maryland Francis King Carey School of Law). He was born into a prominent Black family which published, the Baltimore Afro-American.

Murphy Sr. was married to Madeline Wheeler (1922–2007), a noted civil rights activist, and together they had five children. His children include Billy Murphy Jr. (born 1943), a lawyer and judge; and Laura W. Murphy (born 1955), a lobbyist and civil rights activist.
