= 1983 Baltimore mayoral election =

- November 8, 1983
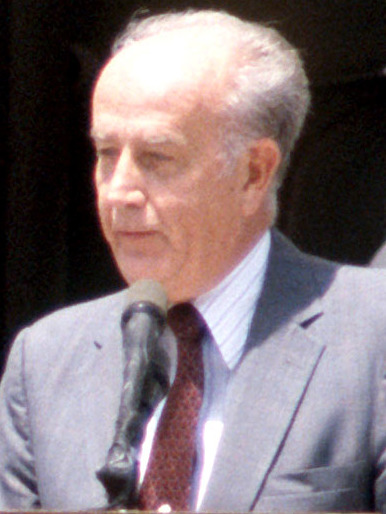

Candidate	William Donald Schaefer	Samuel A. Culotta
Party	Democratic	Republican
Popular vote	130,741	8,771
Percentage	93.71%	6.29%
Mayor before election
William Donald Schaefer
Democratic
Elected mayor
William Donald Schaefer
Democratic

The 1983 Baltimore mayoral election saw the reelection of William Donald Schaefer to a fourth consecutive term.

== Nominations ==
Primary elections were held September 13.

=== Democratic primary ===
Democratic primary results
Party	Candidate	Votes	%
Democratic	William Donald Schaefer (incumbent)	165,986	71.78%
Democratic	William H. Murphy Jr.	60,353	26.10%
Democratic	Monroe Cornish	4,033	1.74%
Democratic	Lawrence Freeman	866	0.38%
Total votes		231,238	

=== Republican primary ===
Republican primary results
Party	Candidate	Votes	%
Republican	Samuel A. Culotta	5,586	64.92%
Republican	Byron P. Roberts Jr.	1,636	19.01
Republican	Melvin C. Perkins	1,383	16.07%
Total votes		8,605	

== General election ==
The general election was held November 8.

Baltimore mayoral general election, 1983
Party	Candidate	Votes	%
Democratic	William Donald Schaefer (incumbent)	130,741	93.71%
Republican	Samuel A. Culotta	8,771	6.29%
Total votes		139,512	
Democratic hold			
