= Cherry Hill, Baltimore =

Neighborhood of Baltimore, Maryland, United States

Coordinates: 39.24940°N 76.62346°W

Cherry Hill
- Neighborhood of Baltimore
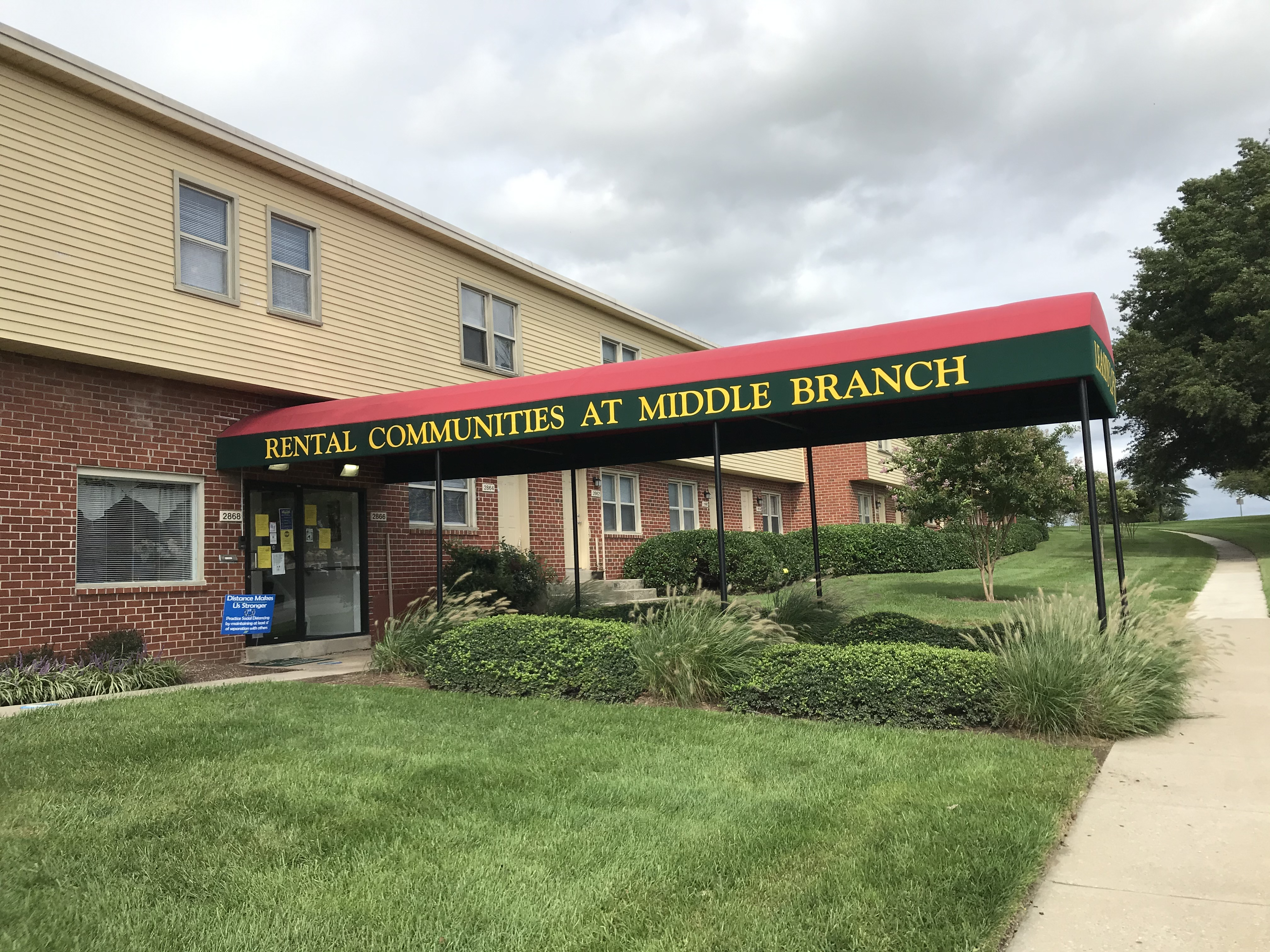
- Middle Branch Manor Apartments on 2800 block of Potee Street in Cherry Hill, Baltimore

- Location within Baltimore
- Country: United States
- State: Maryland
- City: Baltimore
- Time zone: UTC-5 (Eastern)
  - Summer (DST): EDT
- ZIP code: 21225
- Area code: 410, 443

Cherry Hill is one of the southernmost neighborhoods in Baltimore, Maryland. It has a population of 11,977 as of May 2026. It is a historically significant neighborhood in southern Baltimore, known as the first planned suburban community for African Americans in the U.S. and home to the city's largest public housing project. It is a relatively isolated peninsula located south of downtown, bounded by the Middle Branch of the Patapsco River. Limited access points include Hanover Street and the Cherry Hill Light Rail stop.

Cherry Hill developed in the 1940s to house African American veterans of WWII and the Korean War and was home to a community of Roma people in the early 1900s. In the 2015–2016 school year, the Maritime Industries Academy moved to Cherry Hill to provide a local high school option for teenagers, which then officially closed in 2023 due to health hazards and low attendance rates.

Cherry Hill is largely affected by the incinerators and landfills located in South Baltimore, and the residents have some of the highest cancer and asthma rates in the country. Cherry Hill is also a major food desert and has a large minority population. There are several initiatives being taken to better the community, including implementing recycling and composting programs, as well as ecological restoration activities. The neighborhood is home to Harbor Hospital and the bakery that makes the famous local Berger Cookies. It includes the Cherry Hill Homes (over 1,000 public housing units), private homes, and other low-income apartments.

== Geography ==
Its southern geographic location from the city's center, bounded by the Middle Branch of the Patapsco River to the north, the river's main channel to the east, and railroad tracks, including the tracks of the Baltimore Light Rail system, to the west and Baltimore Highlands, Maryland to the south. Cherry Hill is home to Baltimore's largest public housing project, Cherry Hill Homes, with over 1000 units, private homes, and several other low-income apartments throughout the community.

In 2014, Baltimore City Public Schools announced that Maritime Industries Academy, a high school in northeast Baltimore, was moving to Cherry Hill. This was done in part to revamp the Herring Run recreational center in Frankford, the school's neighborhood. Most Cherry Hill residents agreed with the decision to move the high school to the area, as they needed a high school for teenage residents to attend, so they can avoid long transportation hours. The high school moving took action for the start of the 2015–2016 school year.

As of 2023, Maritime Industries Academy is closed. In 2016, several schools faced closures proposed by city schools' CEO Gregory Thornton, with Maritime Industries Academy being one of them. Its attempt to move from Northeast Baltimore to Cherry Hill had failed. This was due to low enrollment and attendance rates, as well as poor academic performance and issues with the facility. These issues included many safety and health hazards, such as broken windows and mold.

== Transportation ==
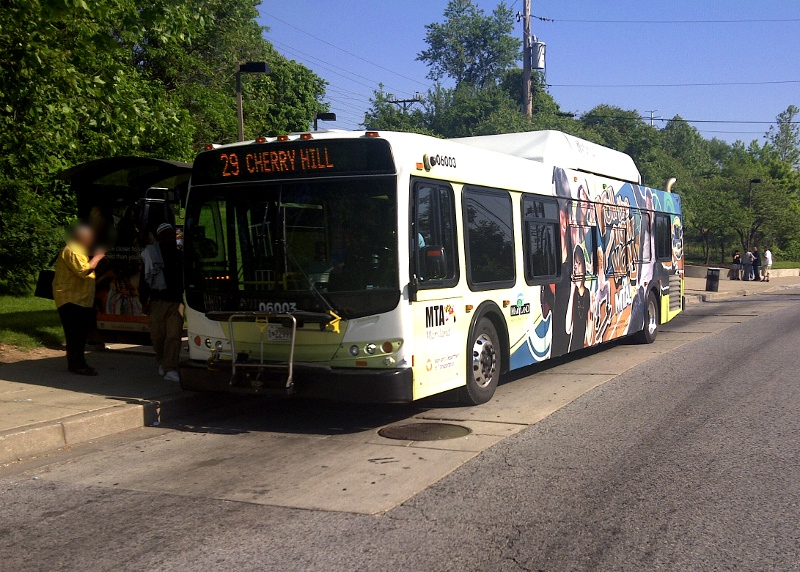
Route 26 and 71 bus at the Cherry Hill Light Rail Station.

The only roads leading in or out of the neighborhood are Hanover Street, Potee Street, Cherry Hill Road and Waterview Avenue. The Maryland Transit Administration (MTA) serves the highly populated area with the need for public transportation by bus 26, 71, and the already noted Baltimore Light Rail at the Cherry Hill light rail stop located on the northwest edge of the neighborhood. There are only two bus lines in Cherry Hill, and only about 40% of the community has cars.

== History ==
The Cherry Hill neighborhood was developed fairly recently in Baltimore's history. Like Armistead Gardens, the community was founded as a home for African-American veterans returning from both World War II and the Korean War. In the early and mid-1900s, Cherry Hill was home to an encampment of Roma of Romanian descent. The Roma settled in Cherry Hill because it was undeveloped and on the outskirts of the city. Many of the Roma were in fortune telling and traveled up and down the East Coast, with Baltimore as a central location on the carnival circuit. Due to a series of antiziganist laws passed in the 1920s and 1930s that banned fortune-telling and required a $1,000 fee for nomads to enter the city of Baltimore, the Roma community left Cherry Hill, but soon returned because the laws were rarely enforced. The laws were repealed in 1976. There was still a small Romanian population as of 1994. Many members of that community still felt unaccepted in their Baltimore community.

Cherry Hill is home to numerous incinerators and landfills. The Baltimore Refuse Energy Systems Company (BRESCO) trash incinerator was established in April 1985. The incinerator burns about 700,000 tons of trash annually and has around 70 employees. It is responsible for 36% of all air emissions in Baltimore, and the incinerator costs Maryland and nearby states $55 million in human health problems. The BRESCO incinerator cannot function properly without the amount of trash it consumes, meaning that having a goal of true waste disposal is not possible. The city of Baltimore has also committed over $100 million to expand the Quarantine Road Landfill. The landfill was created in 1986 to be used to dispose of the incinerator ash. About half the weight of what is disposed of in the landfill is incinerator ash, which is toxic and detrimental to the health of the community. In 2031, the BRESCO contract will end.

== Environmental justice ==
Cherry Hill was established as a housing project for African American veterans due to protests from wealthy White communities in Lakeland and Morrell Park. It became the nation’s first planned “black” suburb.

The racial diversity of Cherry Hill is: Black- 65%, White- 17%, Hispanic- 11%, Asian- 2%, Other- 3%, Two or more races- 2%. As for the education levels of the residents, 7% have a master’s degree or higher, 8% have a bachelor’s degree or higher, 23% have some college or associate's degree, 43% have a high school diploma or equivalent, and 19% have less than high school diploma.

Around 36% of household incomes are under $25,000, with the median household income being $33,000 (the national median household income is around $80,000), and several thousands of people suffer from some of the worst social and health inequities in Baltimore. Cherry Hill is also a very isolated neighborhood and has no grocery stores, only a dollar store. It has been labeled as a “food desert”. COVID-19 largely impacted Cherry Hill. Many did not have access to proper healthcare, and it took a huge toll on the community- especially due to the lack of food access- as well as taking a toll on mental health. However, due to many volunteering efforts, Cherry Hill was able to provide fresh produce to those in need by delivering over 100,000 pounds of food to the residents. The community was able to avoid a food crisis, and this volunteering left a positive impact on the community. Volunteers continue to help the community today by participating in these efforts.

According to Maryland's Department of the Environment, Cherry Hill is both an underserved and overburdened community. Their Environmental Justice score falls in the >75-100 percentile. This means that the community has a higher pollution and vulnerability burden than at least 75% of the state’s population. Cherry Hill, along with many other South Baltimore communities, suffer from air contamination. This contamination is caused by several problems, including incinerators, coal terminals, and chemical plants in the area. This has led to South Baltimore having some of the highest asthma and cancer rates in the country.

Marvin Hayes, founder of the Baltimore Compost Collective, states that much of what these incinerators burn- about 85%- can be recycled or composted, and about 25% of what can be composted is food. There are collection processes that are done regularly which gather this organic waste and are turned into compost for the community to use. Additionally, recycling programs, such as through The Recycling Partnership, have been set up, which have increased recycling rates by a large amount.

Other initiatives are being taken to transform Cherry Hill. One example is the Middle Branch Resiliency Initiative. This project is the largest coastal resilience initiative in Maryland. The goal is to provide better water quality, establish habitats for native species, and improved protection for the community. Some of this improved protection includes increased habitat value and nutrient uptake, sediment reduction, and greater defense against storm surges. It will also help to prevent flooding and shoreline erosion, as well as removing invasive plants and planting native species. The initiative could also act as a demonstration for other urban watersheds and similar restoration projects.

== Economy ==
Harbor Hospital is based in the eastern edge of the neighborhood.

Cherry Hill is also home to DeBaufre Bakeries, the maker of local icon Berger Cookies.

== Notable residents ==
- Billy Murphy Jr., judge
- Laura W. Murphy, lobbyist and civil rights activist
- Madeline Wheeler Murphy, civil rights activist
