= Carl J. Murphy =

American journalist, publisher, civil rights activist (1889–1967)

- Born: January 17, 1889; Baltimore, Maryland, U.S.
- Died: February 25, 1967 (aged 78)
- Education: Friedrich Schiller University Jena, Howard University, Harvard University
- Occupation(s): Journalist, publisher, civil rights leader, educator
- Spouse: Lula Vashti Turley
- Children: 5, including Elizabeth Murphy Moss
- Father: John H. Murphy Sr.
- Relatives: George B. Murphy Jr. (nephew), William H. Murphy Sr. (nephew), John H. Murphy III (nephew)

Carl J. Murphy (January 17, 1889 – February 25, 1967) was an African-American journalist, publisher, civil rights leader, and educator. He was publisher of the Afro-American newspaper chain of Baltimore, Maryland, expanding its coverage with regional editions in several major cities of the Washington, D.C., area, as well as Newark, New Jersey, a destination of thousands of rural blacks in the Great Migration to the North.

Murphy completed a doctorate in 1913 at the Friedrich Schiller University Jena (FSU) in Jena, Germany after earning bachelor's and master's degrees at Howard University and Harvard University universities, respectively. He became chairman of the German department at Howard University, before the United States entered World War I. In 1918, he started working at the Baltimore Afro-American newspaper, founded by his father, which he led it for 45 years.

== Early life, family, and education ==
Carl Murphy was born on January 17, 1889, in Baltimore, Maryland. His parents were John Henry Murphy Sr. and Martha (Howard) Murphy.

He graduated from Howard University in 1911, earning a master's degree at Harvard University in 1913, and a doctorate at the University of Jena in Germany in 1913.

== Career ==
Murphy served as a professor of German and chairman of the German department at Howard University between 1913 and 1918. In 1918, he joined the staff of the Baltimore Afro-American newspaper, founded and run by his father John H. Murphy, Sr.

In 1922, upon his father's death, Murphy assumed control of the paper. During the next four decades, he established the Afro as a major African-American newspaper of national importance. At its peak, the Afro-American published nine national editions, in a total of 13 major cities including Baltimore; Washington, D.C.; Richmond, Virginia; and Newark, New Jersey. Murphy built up the Afro-American from a journal with 14,000 circulation to more than 200,000; and he employed more than 200 workers.

In addition to managing the Afro, Murphy became actively involved with the Baltimore branch of the NAACP. In December 1932, he declared the NAACP's intention to challenge racial segregation at the state's flagship University of Maryland. By 1935, with the help of NAACP attorneys Charles Hamilton Houston and Thurgood Marshall, the NAACP forced open the university's law school to black students. Their legal challenge was used at other universities across the Jim Crow South.

Murphy supported the election in 1935 of Lillie Mae Carroll Jackson to the presidency of the local NAACP branch. She was straightforward and tireless, a counterpoint to Murphy's tendency to work behind the scenes. Jackson served in this post until 1970.

With Murphy's leadership, the Afro was deeply involved in helping organize Martin Luther King Jr.'s August 1963 "March on Washington for Jobs and Freedom". The paper designated a team of columnists and reporters to aid in the demonstration's promotion, and dispatched another team of journalist to detail its progress. In its 80th anniversary issue, the Afro called Murphy "a man with a purpose." Murphy ran the paper for 45 years.

He was a lifelong Mason. In addition, Murphy was prominent in the Republican Party: he was appointed as a member of President Herbert Hoover's 1930 Commission to Haiti. Later he was a member of the Electoral College for the 1960 Presidential election. His influence was felt far beyond his home in Baltimore, Maryland.

As a result of Baltimore's segregated public education, Murphy and the Afro staff were very concerned about the unsatisfactory education being provided to black children and the complicity of Baltimore's white power structure. During the 1920s the newspaper intensified its campaign for a first-rate school system, in order to provide black children with upward mobility in American society as well as fulfilling and fairly paid employment for black educators. These efforts served as the foundation for a stable and prosperous black middle class.

To peers and contemporaries, the diminutive Murphy was a giant in action. His grandson Ben Phillips described him as about 5'3" in height. Following the landmark U.S. Supreme Court Decision in Brown v. Board of Education (1954), Thurgood Marshall publicly acknowledged a debt of gratitude to Murphy.

Murphy died on February 25, 1967, the day the Maryland General Assembly repealed a 306-year-old state law banning interracial marriage. The Afro publisher and civil rights leader had waged a battle for decades to have this law repealed.

=== Murphy Family ===
Murphy met his future wife, Vashti Turley (née Lula Vashti Turley), while she was a student in his German class at Howard University. Murphy and Turley married in Washington, D.C. on June 20, 1916.

Soon after their marriage, they returned to Baltimore, where he started working with his father in 1918, at the Baltimore Afro-American. By the late 1930s, the Murphy family was prosperous and expanding. By then, the couple had five daughters—Elizabeth, Ida, Carlita, Vashti and Frances.

Four of their five daughters held positions at the paper. Their youngest daughter, Frances L. Murphy II, served as publisher and chairman of the board in the 1970s. She succeeded John H. Murphy III who was Carl's nephew, the son of Daniel Murphy. Their granddaughter, Frances Murphy Draper, serves as publisher and CEO she succeeded her cousin in 2018, John J. Oliver, who is publisher emeritus.

== Legacy ==
- In 2015, Murphy was posthumously inducted into the Hall of Fame of the MDDC Press Association
- The first female Bishop of the A.M.E. Church, Vashti Murphy McKenzie, is Murphy's granddaughter
