= John H. Murphy Sr. =

American publisher (1840–1922)

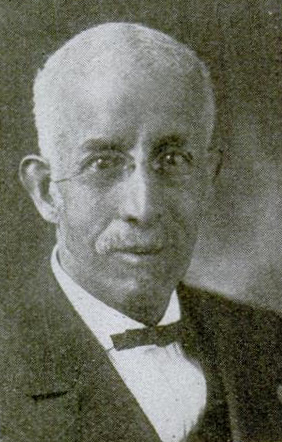
- Born: John Henry Murphy; December 25, 1840; Baltimore, Maryland, U.S.
- Died: April 5, 1922 (aged 81)
- Occupations: Publisher, journalist
- Known for: "The Afro-American" (Baltimore)
- Spouse: Martha Elizabeth Howard
- Children: 11, including Carl J. Murphy
- Relatives: William H. Murphy Sr. (grandchild), George B. Murphy Jr. (grandchild)

John Henry Murphy Sr. (25 December 1840 – 5 April 1922) was an African-American newspaper publisher based in Baltimore, Maryland. Born into slavery, he is best known as the founder of the Baltimore Afro-American (also known colloquially/for short as The AFRO), published by the AFRO-American Newspaper Company of Baltimore, Inc. This newspaper is one of the oldest operating black family-owned newspapers in the U.S.A.

== Early life and military service ==
John Henry Murphy was born into slavery in Baltimore, Maryland on Christmas Day 1840. His parents were Benjamin Murphy III, who was a whitewasher, and his wife, Susan Colby (or Coby). He is believed to have been enslaved until age 24, when he mustered into the newly organized United States Colored Troops, 30th Infantry Regiment, forming in Camp Stanton, Maryland, in February 1864. He eventually served as a non-commissioned officer, reaching the rank of sergeant. (Only whites were allowed to be commissioned officers at the time.)

Little is known about young Murphy before his service in the American Civil War. He was among the more than 8,000 Black Marylanders and other states' residents who mustered into various Black regiments throughout the State of Maryland, after 1863 and emancipation, when the Federal Government decided to accept black recruits in the Army. President Abraham Lincoln announced the "Emancipation Proclamation" in September 1862, giving freedom to all slaves still held within then rebelling Confederate States, and taking effect on New Year's Day, January 1, 1863. Afterward, the U.S. War Department and state militia officials actively recruited freedmen, free men of color, and fugitive slaves into the Union Army in the U.S.C.T., to serve along with the previous recruited units of various Northern states, such as the famous 54th Massachusetts Regiment.

== Post-war years ==
=== Marriage and family ===
In 1868, Murphy married Martha Elizabeth Howard, a daughter of the well-to-do African-American farmer, Enoch George Howard of Montgomery County, Maryland, who was a free man of color before the war. They met in church. Murphy and his wife Martha settled in Baltimore and had 11 children together; 10 of them survived to adulthood. Among them was their son Carl J. Murphy, who began to work formally with his father on the paper in 1918.

=== Career ===
After the war, Murphy returned home and worked as a whitewasher, a trade he learned from his father. The development of wallpaper at prices available to the middle class made whitewashing obsolete. Murphy was appointed to the federal civil service in the postal service. He later worked in various jobs: as a porter, janitor, manager of a feed store, and manager of the printing department of the Afro-American, published by Rev. Harry Bragg Sr. for his church.

During these years, Murphy became active with Bethel African Methodist Episcopal (AME) Church, founded in Philadelphia in the early 19th century as the first black denomination in the United States. After being appointed as a District Sunday School Superintendent, Murphy used a manual printing press to produce a weekly church publication, the Sunday School Helper, to make copies of materials for students. In 1897 Murphy purchased the printing presses of the Afro-American at auction with $200 borrowed from his wife, who had sold land inherited from her father. He merged the Sunday School Helper with the Afro. In 1900, he acquired another newspaper, The Ledger, and renamed his paper as The Afro-American Ledger.

Murphy helped build the African-American community in Baltimore by sharing its news, pressing for civil rights, and reporting on abuses. At first his family worked unpaid for the paper. Later he had up to 100 employees. "He crusaded for racial justice while exposing racism in education, jobs, housing, and public accommodations. In 1913, he was elected president of the National Negro Press Association."

Due to the economic and political power of blacks in Baltimore, who comprised a large community, and the activism of people like Murphy, the Maryland state legislature did not follow the example of other southern states and disenfranchise black voters at the turn of the century. African Americans struggled with discrimination in the city but maintained more freedom and political power than blacks in most other southern states.

His son Carl Murphy, by then having a doctorate from the University of Jena in Germany and serving as head of the German department at Howard University, returned to Baltimore in 1918 to work on the paper in his father's last years.

=== Death and Murphy Family Legacy ===
Murphy died at the age of 81, at home, on April 5, 1922 of acute nephritis. He was interred at Mount Auburn Cemetery. His son, Carl J. Murphy was named as editor and publisher of the paper and went on to lead it for 45 years. Murphy's descendants continued to lead the newspaper over the course of the next generations, with his granddaughter Francis L. Murphy leading the paper in the 1970s, and his grandson and namesake, John H. Murphy, III leading the paper in the 1970s and 1980s.

== Legacy and honors ==
- 2008, Murphy was named posthumously to the Hall of Fame, Maryland-Delaware-DC Press Association, established in 1947.
