= Baltimore Afro-American =

Newspaper in Baltimore, Maryland

The AFRO American Newspaper Company
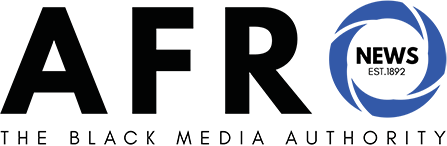

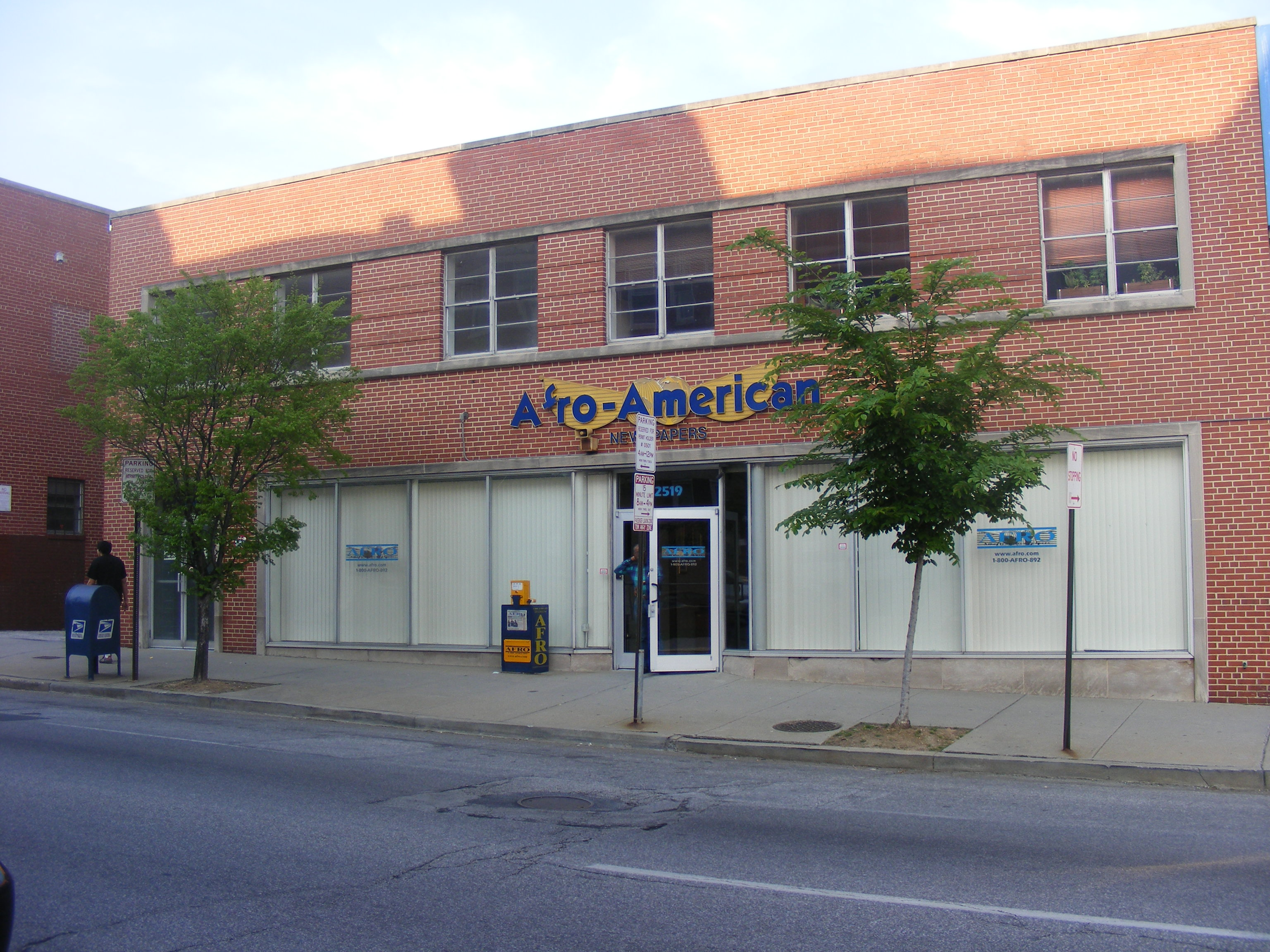
- Type: Weekly newspaper
- Format: Broadsheet
- Publisher: Frances M. Draper
- Managing editor: Dorothy S. Boulware
- News editor: Jessica Dortch
- Founded: 13 August 1892 (133 years ago)
- Language: English
- Headquarters: 145 W. Ostend Street; Suite 600. Office #536; Baltimore, Maryland 21230
- Country: United States
- ISSN: 2473-5973
- OCLC number: 7642696
- Website: afro.com

The Baltimore Afro-American, commonly known as The Afro or Afro News, is a weekly African-American newspaper published in Baltimore, Maryland. It is the flagship newspaper of the AFRO-American chain and the longest-running African-American family-owned newspaper in the United States, established in 1892.

== History ==
Nameplate of The Afro-American Ledger, September 6, 1913

Initially the Afro-American was known as the Home Protector which was established and edited by Reverend William Alexander in 1889. With the help of a group of investors, including John R. Cole, Charles H. Richardson, James E. Johnson, and William H. Daly, the Home Protector became the Afro-American on August 13, 1892.

In the spring of 1895, the Northwestern Family Supply Company (NFSC), assumed control of the Afro-American. Although this seemed to be a turn for the best, that prominent business firm went bankrupt leading to near end of the newspaper. In 1897, the machinery used to print the Afro-American went up for sale. John H. Murphy Sr., then the head of the printing press at the paper, purchased the newspaper's printing equipment for $200, which he borrowed from his wife, Martha Howard Murphy. Since then, the Afro-American has been owned and operated by the Murphy family.

John H. Murphy Sr. was born into slavery and served in the Civil War in the United States Colored Troops, reaching the rank of sergeant (NCO). He worked a variety of jobs after the war. Active with the Bethel African Methodist Episcopal Church in Baltimore, a denomination founded in the early 19th century in Philadelphia as the first independent Black religion in the United States. Murphy merged his church publication, The Sunday School Helper, with two other church publications, The Ledger and The Afro-American. With The Afro-American, Murphy promoted unity in the Black community of Baltimore, as well as combating racial discrimination in the city and working for children's education. "He crusaded for racial justice while exposing racism in education, jobs, housing and public accommodations. In 1913, he was elected president of the National Negro Press Association."

In 1905, the Afro-American urged its readers to vote against the Poe Amendment, a piece of legislation meant to disenfranchise black voters. When the Strauss Amendment followed in 1908, the paper persisted, attacking advocates of the amendment.

The publication began to grow to reach more cities and to rise in national prominence after his son Carl J. Murphy took control in 1922, serving as its editor for 45 years. He expanded the paper to have nine national editions, with papers published in 13 major cities. At its peak, the paper published two weekly editions in Baltimore and regional weekly editions in cities including Washington, DC; Philadelphia; Richmond, Virginia; and Newark, New Jersey, the latter a destination northern city for many Blacks from the rural South during the Great Migration to the North in the first half of the 20th century. In the early 21st century, the AFRO-American has two city editions: one in Baltimore, and the other for Washington, D.C.

During the 1924 presidential election, the Afro-American threw their support behind the Progressives established at the Baltimore Federation of Labor Offices and led by Elisabeth Coit Gilman and Broadus Mitchell.

Through the summer of 1932, the Baltimore AFRO-American published revealing personal letters from prominent African-American scientist and Howard University professor Percy Lavon Julian. This led to a scandal and the pressure forced Julian to resign from Howard.

Carl Murphy used the editorial pages of The AFRO-American to push for the hiring of African Americans by Baltimore's police and fire departments; to press for Black representation in the legislature; and for the establishment of a state supported university to educate African Americans.

In the 1930s The AFRO-American launched a successful campaign known as “The Clean Block” campaign which is still in existence today. The campaign developed into an annual event and was aimed at improving the appearance of, and reducing crime in, inner-city neighborhoods. The AFRO-American also campaigned against the Southern Railroad's use of Jim Crow cars, and fought to obtain equal pay for Maryland's Black schoolteachers.

During World War II, The AFRO-American deployed several of its reporters to Europe, the Aleutians, Africa, Japan, and other parts of the South Pacific, and provided its readers with firsthand coverage of the war. One of its reporters (and Carl Murphy's daughter), Elizabeth Murphy Phillips Moss, was the first Black female correspondent.

The AFRO-American collaborated with The National Association for the Advancement of Colored People (NAACP) on numerous civil rights cases. In the 1930s the newspaper joined forces with the NAACP in the latter's suit against the University of Maryland Law School for its segregationist admission policies. Their combined efforts eventually led to the U.S. Supreme Court's 1954 decision outlawing segregated public schools. The AFRO-American also supported actor/singer Paul Robeson and sociologist W.E.B. DuBois during the anti-Communist campaigns of the Joseph McCarthy era.

The AFRO-American has employed many notable Black journalists and intellectuals, including Langston Hughes, William Worthy and J. Saunders Redding. In the mid 1930s, it became the first Black newspaper to employ a female sportswriter, when it hired Lillian Johnson and Nell Dodson to serve on its staff. Renowned artist Romare Bearden began his career as a cartoonist at The AFRO-American in 1936.

Sam Lacy, who was hired as the paper's sports editor in 1943 and who, at the age of 94, still wrote a weekly column for the paper, used his weekly ”A to Z” column to campaign for integration in professional sports. Using their writing to protest racial inequities in professional sports, Lacy and sports writers such as Wendell Smith of The Pittsburgh Courier helped to open doors for Black athletes. Following the death of Carl Murphy in 1967, his daughter Frances L. Murphy II served as chairman and publisher. In 1974, John Murphy III, Carl's nephew, was appointed chairman and eventually became the publisher.

Both John H. Murphy Sr. and his son Carl J. Murphy have been posthumously inducted into the MDDC Press Association's Hall of Fame in recognition of their contributions to journalism and publishing, in 2008 and 2015, respectively.

Today, the AFRO is led by 4th and 5th generation descendants of John H. Murphy Sr. It is in partnership with the Strategic Communications and Journalism Departments of Morgan State University's School of Global Journalism and Communication to provide real-time experience for those who would be journalists and/or public relations specialists.

== University collaborative archival project ==
In November 2007, five students were selected from Baltimore institutions, Johns Hopkins University, Morgan State University and Goucher College, to begin work under an Andrew W. Mellon Foundation grant "to uncover and describe the content" of the newspaper's archives, held at its headquarters. These included manuscripts, articles, photographs, and clippings that date to the founding of the paper. "The objectives of the project are to identify important unprocessed collections at the newspaper, inventory and organize the collection, and ultimately create an online database for searching the material."

== See also ==
- Media in Baltimore
- List of newspapers in Maryland
