= Free African Society =

African-American mutual aid organization

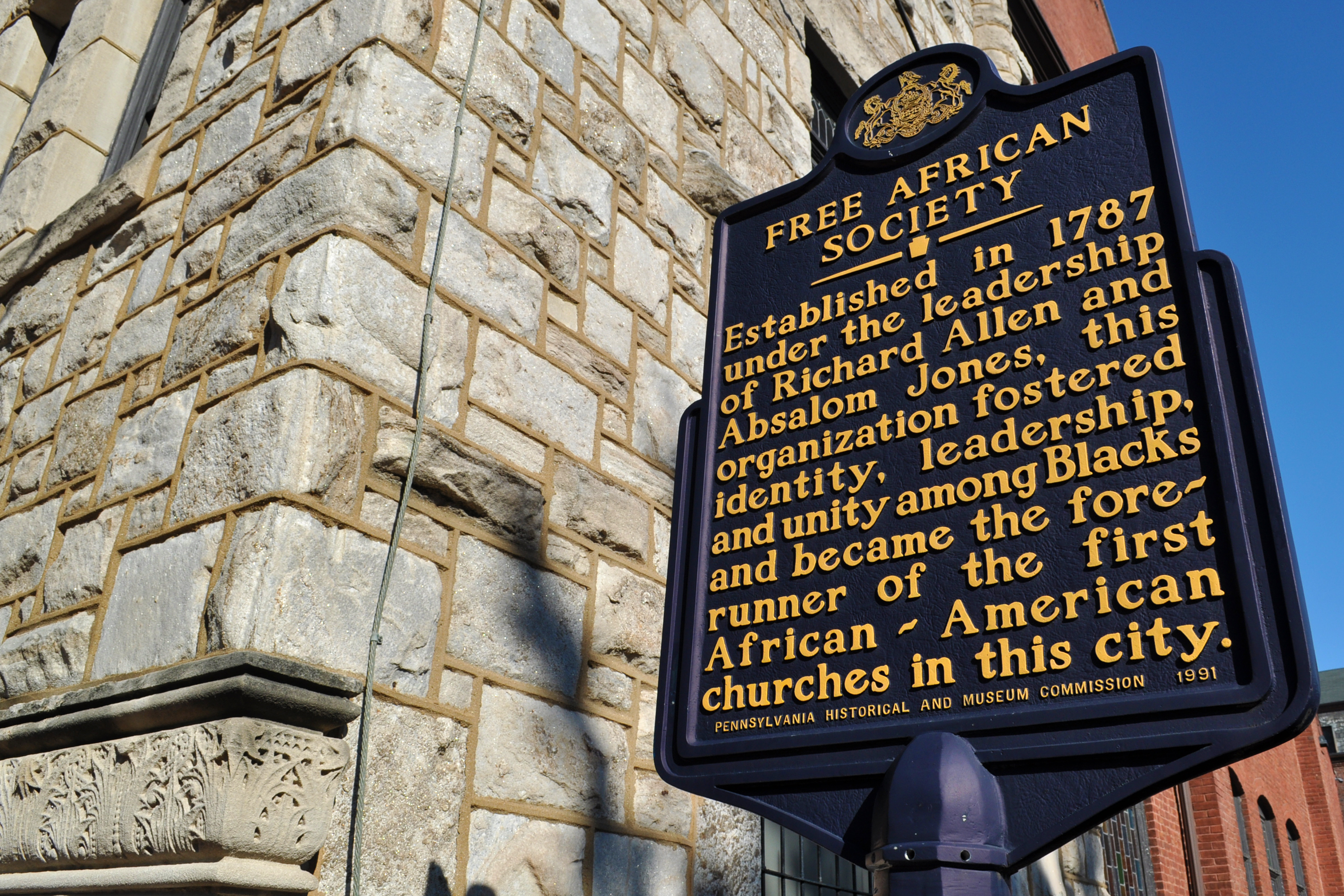
Free African Society Historical Marker, 6th and Lombard Sts. Philadelphia

The Free African Society (FAS), founded in 1787, was a benevolent organization that held religious services and provided mutual aid for "free Africans and their descendants" in Philadelphia. The Society was founded by Richard Allen and Absalom Jones. It was the first Black religious institution in the city and led to the establishment of the first independent Black churches in the United States.

Founding members, all free Black men, included Samuel Baston, Joseph Johnson, Cato Freedman, Caesar Cranchell, James Potter and William White. Notable members included African-American abolitionists such as Cyrus Bustill, James Forten, and William Gray.

== Background ==
The Free African Society (FAS) developed as part of the rise in civic organizing following American independence in the 1776 to 1783 Revolutionary War; it was the first black mutual aid society in Philadelphia. The city was a growing center of free blacks, attracted to its jobs and other opportunities. By 1790, the city had 2,000 free black residents, a number that continued to increase. In the first two decades after the war, inspired by revolutionary ideals, many slaveholders freed their slaves, especially in the Upper South. Northern states largely abolished slavery. Numerous freedmen migrated to Philadelphia from rural areas of Pennsylvania and the South; it was a growing center of free black society. In addition, their number was increased by free people of color who were refugees from the Haitian Revolution in Saint-Domingue, as well as fugitive slaves escaping from the South.

== Early years: 1787 to 1822 ==
The FAS was founded in the spring of 1787 in Philadelphia, shortly before the Constitutional Convention was held in the city.

Richard Allen, a Methodist preacher, and Absalom Jones rejected the second-class status blacks were forced into at their white-dominated Methodist church. As their numbers had increased, the church congregation had built a gallery where it asked them to sit separately from the white congregation. The men and their supporters wanted to create an independent group to meet African-American needs. They designed the Free African Society as a mutual aid society to help support widows and orphans, as well as the sick or unemployed. They supported the education of children, or arranged apprenticeships if the children could not attend one of the free schools that were developed.

The FAS provided social and economic guidance, and medical care. It also helped new citizens establish their new sense of self-determination. While teaching thriftiness and how to save to build wealth, it became the model for banks in the African-American community. It sought to improve the morals of its members by regulating marriages, condemning drunkenness and adultery. Working with the city, it acquired land at Potter's Field for a burying ground; it began to perform and record marriages and also to record births for the people of its community.

To encourage responsibility and create a common aid fund, the FAS asked members to pay dues of one shilling per month. If they failed to pay dues for three months, they were cut off from the society, no longer able to share in its benefits. The dues collected were the fund for the community service projects that the FAS organized. Among these was a food program to help support the community's poor and widowed.

== Yellow fever epidemic of 1793 ==
In aid to the sick, the FAS became famous for its members' charitable work as nurses and aides during the Yellow Fever Epidemic of 1793, when many residents abandoned the city. The doctor Benjamin Rush believed African Americans were immune to the disease. He wrote an open letter in the newspaper, under the pseudonym of a well-known Quaker who helped educate blacks, and appealed to blacks to aid others in the city during the epidemic. Allen and Jones decided to respond, together with other members of the FAS who served both black and white residents as nurses and aides during those terrible months.

After all their work, Allen and Jones wrote a memoir about the events, which they published the following year, A Narrative of the Proceedings of the Black People during the late awful calamity ... They were trying to set the record straight and defend themselves against an accusatory pamphlet published by Mathew Carey, after he had fled the city for much of September 1793. He accused blacks of charging high prices for nursing, taking advantage of whites, and even of stealing from them during the epidemic. His pamphlet was entitled A Short Account of the Malignant Fever (1793). Allen and Jones noted that it was whites who charged high rates for nursing during the crisis.

== 1794 to early 1800s ==
Many members who wanted more religious affiliation followed Absalom Jones when he founded African Episcopal Church of St. Thomas. Mother Bethel A.M.E. Church opened its doors in 1794. In 1803, Cyrus Bustill opened a school for black children in his home, and a year later, Absalom Jones opened another school. By 1837, with financial help from the Quakers and the Pennsylvania Abolition Society, ten private schools for blacks were operating in Philadelphia.

== Preamble and articles of the association ==
PREAMBLE OF THE FREE AFRICAN SOCIETY

Philadelphia

[12th, 4th mo., 1778]-- Whereas, Absalom Jones and Richard Allen, two men of the African race, who, for their religious life and conversation have obtained a good report among men, these persons, from a love to the people of their complexion whom they beheld with sorrow, because of their irreligious and uncivilized state, often communed together upon this painful and important subject in order to form some kind of religious society, but there being too few to be found under the like concern, and those who were, differed in their religious sentiments; with these circumstances they labored for some time, till it was proposed, after a serious communication of sentiments, that a society should be formed, without regard to religious tenets, provided, the persons lived an orderly and sober life, in order to support one another in sickness, and for the benefit of their widows and fatherless children.

ARTICLES.

[17th, 5th mo., 1787] — We, the free Africans and their descendants, of the City of Philadelphia, in the State of Pennsylvania, or elsewhere, do unanimously agree, for the benefit of each other, to advance one shilling in silver Pennsylvania currency a month; and after one year's subscription from the date hereof, then to hand forth to the needy of this Society, if any should require, the sum of three shillings and nine pence per week of the said money: provided, this necessity is not brought on them by their own imprudence.

And it is further agreed, that no drunkard nor disorderly person be admitted as a member, and if any should prove disorderly after having been received, the said disorderly person shall be disjointed from us if there is not an amendment, by being informed by two of the members, without having any of his subscription money returned.

And if any should neglect paying his monthly subscription for three months, and after having been informed of the same by two of the members, and no sufficient reason appearing for such neglect, if he do not pay the whole the next ensuing meeting, he shall be disjointed from us, by being informed by two of the members its an offender, without having any of his subscription money returned.

Also, if any person neglect meeting every month, for every omission he shall pay three pence, except in case or sickness or any other complaint that should require the assistance of the Society, then, and in such a case, he shall be exempt from the fines and subscription during the said sickness.

Also, we apprehend it to be just and reasonable, that the surviving widow of a deceased member should enjoy the benefit of this Society so long as she remains his widow, complying with the rules thereof, excepting the subscriptions.

And we apprehend it to be necessary, that the children of our deceased members be under the care of the Society, so far as to pay for the education of their children, if they cannot attend the free school; also to put them out apprentices to suitable trades or places, if required.

Also, that no member shall convene the Society together; but, it shall be the sole business of the committee, and that only on special occasions, and to dispose of the money in hand to the best advantage, for the use of the Society, after they are granted the liberty at a monthly meeting, and to transact all other business whatsoever, except that of Clerk and Treasurer.

And we unanimously agree to choose Joseph Clarke to be our Clerk and Treasurer; and whenever another should succeed him, it is always understood, that one of the people called Quakers, belonging to one of the three monthly meetings in Philadelphia, is to be chosen to act as Clerk and Treasurer of this useful Institution.

The following persons met, viz., Absalom Jones, Richard Allen, Samuel Baston, Joseph Johnson, Cato Freeman, Caesar Cranchell, and James Potter, also William White, whose early assistance and useful remarks we found truly profitable. This evening the articles were read, and after some beneficial remarks were made, they were agreed unto.

== See also ==
- Benefit society
- Free African Union Society, Newport, Rhode Island
- Garrison Literary and Benevolent Association, New York City, USA
