= St. George's United Methodist Church (Philadelphia) =

Historic church in Pennsylvania, United States

- St. George's Methodist Church
- U.S. National Register of Historic Places
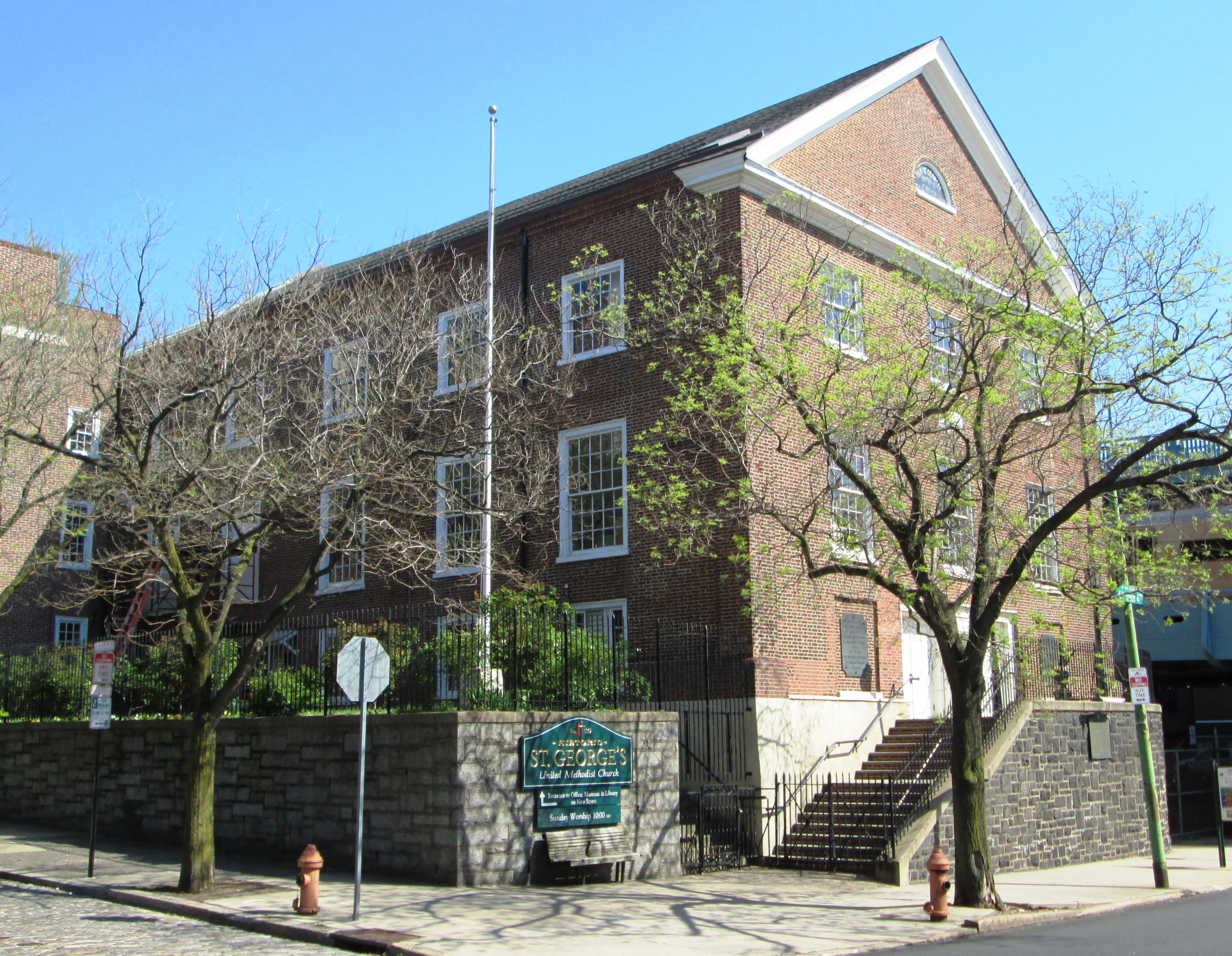
- (2013)

- Location within Philadelphia Location within Pennsylvania Location within the United States
- Location: 324 New Street, Philadelphia, Pennsylvania
- Coordinates: 39°57′17.9″N 75°8′46.82″W
- Built: 1763
- NRHP reference No.: 71000064
- Added to NRHP: May 27, 1971

St. George's United Methodist Church, located at the corner of 4th and New Streets, in the Old City neighborhood of Philadelphia, is the oldest Methodist church in continuous use in the United States, beginning in 1769. The congregation was founded in 1767, meeting initially in a sail loft on Dock Street, and in 1769 it purchased the shell of a building which had been erected in 1763 by a German Reformed congregation. At this time, Methodists had not yet broken away from the Anglican Church and the Methodist Episcopal Church was not founded until 1784.

Richard Allen and Absalom Jones became the first African Americans licensed by the Methodist Church. They were licensed by St. George's Church in 1784. Three years later, protesting racial segregation in the worship services, Allen led most of the black members out of St. George's. Allen's camp founded the Mother Bethel A.M.E. Church and the African Methodist Episcopal denomination, while Jones became an Episcopal priest, founding the African Episcopal Church of St. Thomas.

In the 1920s a court case saved the church from being demolished to make way for the Benjamin Franklin Bridge. The case resulted in the bridge being relocated.

St. George's has experienced many changes during its 249-year history. From 100 members in 1769, the church grew to a peak membership of 3,200 congregants in 1835. The Civil War and industrialization changed the neighborhood; the congregation was reduced to 25 by 1900.

Today the church is a Methodist congregation, tracing its roots back to its founding in 1769. The current pastor of St. George's is Reverend Dr. Bill Wilson. St. George's is one of the more than 500 churches in the Eastern PA Conference of the United Methodist Church

St. George's is committed to a theology of love and inclusion, to personal transformation by faith, and to putting God's love to work in the community – the same core values as the first Methodists who met there. St. George's is also continuing with the ongoing work of reconciliation with African-American brothers and sisters for the racial injustices of the past.

== Early Philadelphia Methodist Society ==
The congregation was founded in 1767 and initially met in a sail loft on Dock Street. After meeting at the sail loft for a few years the fledgling Philadelphia Society moved on to their second meeting place which was a “public” house located at 8 Loxley Court, two blocks south of St. George's. This house was owned by prominent Philadelphian Benjamin Lowley who also owned and lived at the house at 177 South 2nd Street, which had a balcony upon which George Whitefield had famously preached to thousands in years prior.

At the Methodist conference in England on August 16, 1768, Methodist founder John Wesley had presented the idea of sending preachers to America. At the conference the following year in Leeds on August 1–4, 1769, Joseph Pilmore and Richard Boardman volunteered to go to America to assist the Methodist societies already forming there and to build upon the years of work done by George Whitefield and others in the Great Awakening.

Joseph Pilmore and Richard Boardman volunteered to preach to the fledgling Methodist movement in the new world colonies. Pilmore and Boardman arrived in Philadelphia October 21, 1769. Boardman then moved on to New York to establish a base there and Pilmore stayed in Philadelphia. They then traded places every four months after that.

In Philadelphia Pilmore and Boardman were welcomed by John Hood and Lambert Wilmer of the Philadelphia Society and soon after they met fellow Methodist preachers Robert Williams and the charismatic Captain Thomas Webb. The society grew rapidly under the guidance of the popular Pilmore and they were soon ready for a new meeting place to accommodate their growing numbers.

== Purchase of the building and grounds ==
On Thursday, November 23, 1769, Joseph Pilmore wrote in his journal:

We met to consult about getting a more convenient place to preach in. That we had would not contain half of the people who wished to hear the word and the winter was approaching, so that they could not stand without. Several places were mentioned, and application was made, but to no purpose. Though the ministers in general were pretty quiet, they did not approve of our preaching in their pulpits. In this, I could not blame them, especially as we form a society of our own, distinct from them and their congregations. What we should do, I could not determine: ground to build upon, might have been easily purchased, but we had no money; and besides we wanted the place immediately. At length we came to an agreement to purchase a very large Shell of a Church, that was built by the Dutch Presbyterians, and left unfinished for want of money. As the poor people had ruined themselves and families by building it, they were obliged to sell it to pay their Creditors. It was put up at public Auction, and sold for seven hundred pounds, though it cost more than two thousand! The circumstances that have attended this place, are very remarkable. The Church was built to support a Party-they spent their fortunes, and were thrown into gaol for debt-the Church was appoint to be sold be an Act of the Assembly-a Gentleman’s son, who was non compos mentis happened to step into the Auction room, and bought it-his Father, wanted to be off of the bargain, but could not, without proving the insanity of his son-rather than attempt this, he was willing to lose fifty pounds by the job. Thus the Lord provided for us-our way was made plain and we resolved to purchase e the place which we did for six hundred and fifty pound. How wonderful the Dispensations of Providence! Surely the very hairs of our heads are all numbered.

The building was purchased for 650 pounds by Miles Pennington, a member of the Philadelphia Methodist Society. On the day of the purchase, the Methodists took possession of the building and began worshiping there, which continues to this day. On Friday, November 24, 1769, the day after the purchase, Pilmore dedicated the unfinished building with a sermon to 100 worshipers upon the text, "Who are thou, O great mountain? Before Zerubbabel thou shalt become a plain, and he shall bring forth the headstone thereof with shoutings, crying grace, grace upon it." (Zechariah 4:7 KJV)

The purchase price did not include the grounds, which were owned by a Dr. Shippen, which was rented to the Society at 70 pounds sterling annually, redeemable within ten years by the payment of 400 pounds. In late 1782 Francis Asbury began an effort to pay off the rest of the grounds and accomplished this task by June 25, 1802.

The corner stone of the building is dated 1763. The building was "a mere shell" when purchased with no paint, plaster, or interior finishing. It originally stood about two feet above the street and took several steps to enter. The construction of the interior developed slowly over the next several years, in 1784 the walls were plastered, and in 1790 the church was floored with more comfortable seats installed. The galleries were built in 1792.

In 1800 a portico was built for the front door. In 1836 the shallow cellar was excavated to allow a vestibule and a room below for a Sunday School, the portico was removed and the center window above the front door was inserted.

== Francis Asbury and The First American Conference ==
Francis Asbury, later one of the first two bishops of the Methodist Episcopal Church, arrived in America on October 27, 1771, after a fifty-three-day ocean voyage from England and received at St. George's. Asbury wrote in his journal, "...we were brought in the evening to a large church, where we met a considerable congregation. Mr. Pilmore preached. The people looked on us with pleasure, hardly knowing how to show their love sufficiently, bidding us welcome with fervent affection, and receiving us as the angels of God." Asbury preached for the first time at St. George's the next day, his first American sermon out of approximately 16,500 that he preached over 270,000 miles of traveling back and forth across the colonies. He served St. George's as pastor but also spent a great deal of time traveling around the colonies. Asbury worked tirelessly to bring Methodism to the new American nation as one of its leading itinerant ministers, traveling 270,000 miles on horseback and ordaining more than 4,000 ministers over the course of 45 years. The first conference at which Asbury presided in Philadelphia was held at St. George's on September 22–26, 1788.

In the spring of 1773 Thomas Rankin, who had been appointed by Methodist founder John Wesley as superintendent of the American Methodists, called the first American Methodist conference. Asbury and Rankin did not have a good relationship and at this conference Asbury was appointed to Baltimore. Maryland was an important bastion of Methodism at the time with 500 of its 1,600 members in that colony. Rankin then had a series of appointments to New York, Pennsylvania, and Delaware.

== American Revolution ==
The outbreak of the American Revolution signaled the beginning of a difficult time for the fledgling American Methodist Church. Church founder John Wesley spoke out against the colonial uprising and lost a great deal of influence in the colonies. Asbury declined to take the loyalty oath to the new revolutionary government and was fined. During a 20-month period during the revolution, Asbury retired at the home of Methodist Judge Thomas White near Dover, Delaware. With the colonies in disarray due to the impacts of war and the accompanying social upheaval, Asbury convened a conference of the northern preachers and virtually assumed control of the American Methodist societies.

In 1776 the Revolution was erupting across the colonies. Thomas Rankin had a premonition about the battle of Long Island Battle of Long Island. John Wesley had written "A Calm Address to the American Colonists", which created antipathy towards the Methodists by supporters of the revolution. Francis Asbury was harassed on several occasions, including being fined for preaching near Baltimore and once have his Chaise shot through, after which he went into hiding. Methodists were imprisoned and beaten for not supporting the rebellion.

In 1777, while the British army occupied Philadelphia, St. George's was occupied for a time as a hospital and then as a riding school for the cavalry. During this time the St. George's community worship at First Baptist Church on Front Street. For years after the war was over British military implements lay around the building. After the war the membership was reorganized with 50 people and Freeborn Garretson was appointed as preacher. The British army left the building in worse shape than they found it and following the war the church members began to build up the church, installing floorboards, seats, and a pulpit. The church was plastered in 1784. The galleries were added in 1790.

During the revolution a controversy had erupted over the issue of the American Methodists being required to receive ordinances and communion from Church of England clergy. This eventually let to the complete separation of the American Methodists from Wesley and Great Britain and the organization of a separate independent church. Wesley recognized the situation and sent Dr. Thomas Coke to America to consecrate Asbury as American church superintendent but Asbury refused until the office until he received the unanimous election of the preachers. This led to the assembling of the Christmas Conference in Baltimore from December 24, 1784 – January 3, 1785. At this conference Asbury and Coke were both elected as Superintendents, a title that was later changed to Bishop.

== African Methodist Episcopal split ==
Early Methodists advocated on behalf of the marginalized black members of their society, both slaves and freed people. John Wesley, just six days before his death and after reading the testimony of former slave Gustavus Vassa wrote a letter to William Wilberforce in an unsuccessful attempt to pass abolition legislation that stated: "I see not how you can go through your glorious enterprise in opposing that execrable villainy, which is the scandal of religion, of England, and of human nature." Joseph Pilmore openly accepted and administered to the black community in Philadelphia and elsewhere in his ministry.

St. George's licensed Richard Allen and Absalom Jones, the first black lay preachers in Methodism in 1784. Born a slave, Richard Allen purchased his freedom two years later in 1786, he then organized a "class" with 42 people, becoming its leader. In 1799 Allen was ordained by Asbury.

The successful outreach of Allen and Jones drew a large community of black worshipers to the congregation. However, racial tensions flared, most notably in a seating policy segregating black members into a newly constructed upstairs gallery, without notification. The next Sunday in 1787, white ushers attempted to forcibly drag a black member of the church, Absolem Jones, to a different pew. They were unsuccessful in removing him, but Allen, Jones, and the other black worshipers walked out of St. George's in a body at the end of the service and refused to return. This led to the formation of the African Episcopal Church of St. Thomas, with Jones as the first pastor, and Mother Bethel African Methodist Episcopal Church, with Allen as its first pastor, and eventually to the formation of the AME denomination.

On October 25, 2009, "The Great Gathering" took place at St. George's in which the community of Mother Bethel AME and St. George's congregations gathered for Sunday worship at St. George's for the first time since the historic walkout. The Rev. Dr. Mark Kelly Tyler preached for this service.

== Church name ==
The building was designed to be a German Reform Church called “Georg Kirchen” in honor of the then reigning King George III of Great Britain. At first the Methodists referred to it as “our new meeting house”, but most likely at Pilmore's suggestion the name was changed to St. George's after the patron saint of England, who was martyred in the Diocletian Persecution in the year 303.

== Timeline ==
1769 October 7 - First Methodist Hymnal published in America; printed at St. George's November 24 - Joseph Pilmore conducts and preaches The Dedication Service and first sermon in this building. St. George's has been in continuous service to God and Methodism ever since. December 3 - Pilmore delivers the rules, statement of faith and principles for American Methodists for the first time. December 8 - The first formal Intercession or Prayer Meeting organized by American Methodists.

1770 March 23 - First Love Feast for Methodists conducted by Pilmore (see cups below) November 1- America's first Watch Night Service December 31- First New Year's Eve Watch Night Service in St. George's, possibly America's first.

1771 October 28- Francis Asbury preaches his first American sermon at St. George's

1773 July 14 - First Conference of American Methodism takes place at St. George's; also the second (May 25, 1774 and third, May 17, 1775)

1775 Thomas Rankin records that many members of the Continental Congress, including George Washington, John Adams and Benjamin Franklin; and other prominent Philadelphians, such as Betsy Ross and Dolly Madison, came to St. George's to worship. John Adams wrote home to his wife, Abigail, that he enjoyed attending St. George's because he was able "to worship with the ladies." Betsy Ross was a member of St. George's after she married outside of the Quaker faith in 1773.

1776 Robert Morris, banker & merchant, attended St. George's New Year's Eve Watch Night Service and goes forth the next morning to successfully raise funds for Washington's army.

1784 November 7 - At St. George's, Dr. Thomas Coke presents Wesley's plan for the government of the Methodist Episcopal Church in America to the public for the first time.

1785 St. George's licensed Richard Allen and Absalom Jones, the first African American Lay Preachers of Methodism. Their successful evangelistic leadership drew a large community of African Americans to the church. As a result, racial tensions flared and after a time a progressively segregated seating policy for blacks brought Allen and Jones to lead the African congregation in a historic walkout leading to the formation of the African Episcopal Church of St. Thomas and Bethel African Methodist Episcopal Church.

1789 August 17 - Rev. John Dickins opens the first Methodist Bookstore at St. George's, laying the foundation for the Methodist Publishing House and the current Cokesbury Book Stores.

1791 Participated in organizing the first Interdenominational Sunday School Association.

1794 November - Officially recognized the African Zoar M.E. Church, led by Harry Hosier.

1851 November - “The Philadelphia Movement” was organized, which contributed significantly to the present day Lay Activities of the UMC.

1863 Robert Henry Pattison served as St. George's pastor in the midst of the Civil War. His son, Robert E. Pattison, a life-long member of St. George's, was elected Pennsylvania's 20th governor.

1952 June 17 - Birthplace of the Northeastern Jurisdictional Board of Lay Activities.

1959 June 23 - President Dwight Eisenhower signs into law P.L. 86–54, 16 U.S.C. § 407m-1, which incorporates St. George's into Independence National Historical Park. The Federal Government acquired and demolished the building on New Street adjacent to the Church for fire prevention purposes in exchange for the Church to be maintained as it existed in colonial times.

November, 24 - First St. George's Banquet, honoring service in the building of our Lord's kingdom.

1971 March 29 - St. George's placed on the National Register of Historic Places.

1976 July 4 - Dr. Norman Vincent Peale, renowned author and pastor of Marble Collegiate Church, leads St. George's Bicentennial Services.

1979 December 31 - St. George's resumes Robert Morris' custom of a New Year's Eve's Watch Night Service in prayer of a national crisis, which was the Iranian Hostage crisis.

1985 January 20 - President Ronald Reagan resumes the Presidential Inaugural Prayer that Bishop Asbury and President Washington initiated by exchanging prayers with St. George's Pastor Dr. Robert Lord Curry. President George H.W. Bush (1989) and George W. Bush (2005) continue the custom.

March 10 - Cardinal John Krol becomes the first Roman Catholic prelate to speak from the Asbury Pulpit in a memorial service for Bishop Fred Pierce Corson.

1986 December 7 - St. George's hosts the Nation's observation of the 250th anniversary of the establishment of the fire service (Benj. Franklin's organization of the Union Fire Co.).

1991 July 10 - U.S. Rep. Thomas Foglietta rises in the House to recognize the retirement of St. George's 140th pastor, Robert Lord Curry, who served from 1972 to June 30, 1991, acknowledging Dr. Curry's contribution to the preservation of all of Philadelphia's historic churches.

1993 January 20 - Ecumenical gathering of Philadelphia clergy at St. George's, where white clergy repented of the sin of racism in marginalizing Mother Bethel AME's founders before the black clergy of Philadelphia.

2009 October 25 - “The Great Gathering”: Mother Bethel AME and St. George's congregations gather for Sunday worship at St. George's for the second time since the historic walkout of 1787.

2019 November 24 - UMC President Bishop Thomas J. Bickerton, joined by EPC Bishop Peggy Johnson and renowned Methodist historian and former St. George's Pastor Alfred Fred Day III and current pastor Mark I. Salvacion, Esq., in St. George's 250th-anniversary service. Afterward, PA State Rep. Mary Isaacson and Philadelphia City Councilman Mark Squilla recognized St. George's two longest-serving members, Dr. Frank Renshaw (1974) and Hon. Peter J. Wirs (1977).
