= A Short Account of the Malignant Fever =

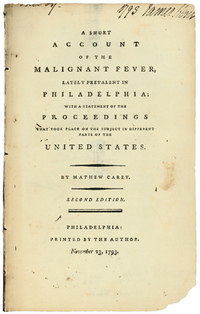
A Short Account of the Malignant Fever

A Short Account of the Malignant Fever (1793) was a pamphlet published by Mathew Carey (January 28, 1760 – September 16, 1839) about the outbreak of the Yellow Fever epidemic Yellow Fever Epidemic of 1793 in Philadelphia in the United States. The first pamphlet of 12 pages was later expanded in three subsequent versions. Local black leaders Absalom Jones and Richard Allen thought that Carey's account did not give sufficient credit to black residents who volunteered as nurses during the outbreak, and published a counter-narrative, “A Narrative of the Proceedings of the Black People During the Late Awful Calamity in Philadelphia (1794). This was all due to Carey's accusations against African Americans in his publication which contained theft and extorting wages from people. Carey agreed with their assessment and revised his pamphlet a fourth time to present that view.

== Background ==
Thomas Jefferson wrote to James Madison in the beginning of September, advising him of the disaster the epidemic would cause throughout the city. At the time, the population of Philadelphia was about 45,000. (Other estimates are 50,000.) Of the residents, an estimated 17,000 were said to have been ill, and nearly 5,000 died.

According to numerous scholars, Dr. Benjamin Rush wrote to Richard Allen, a black preacher and leader of the Free African Society, appealing to him and his people for help. This was due to the lack of white volunteers at the time. Rush also believed that blacks might have immunity to the disease, as he had read accounts by another doctor of a yellow fever in epidemic in Charleston, in which they were reported as surviving at higher rates than whites. He appealed to Allen for aid in the epidemic.
