= Sarah Allen (missionary) =

First missionary woman of the AME (1764–1849)

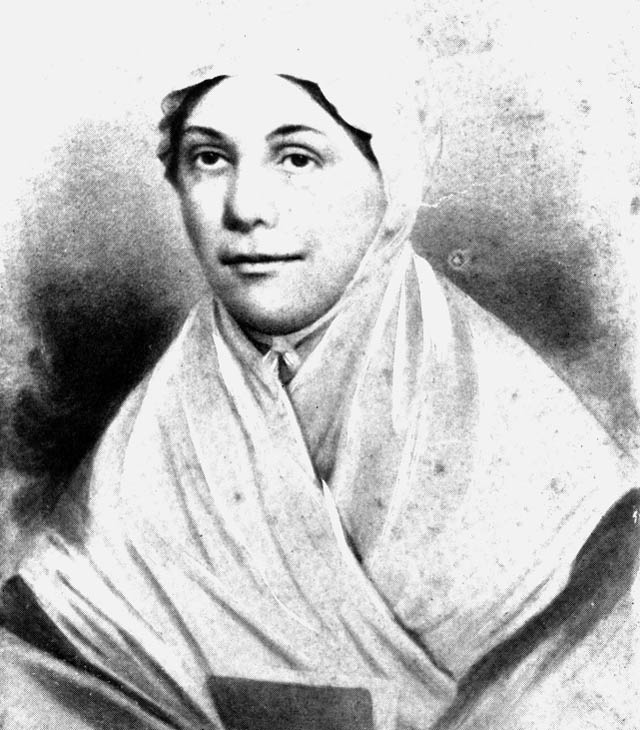
- Sarah Bass Allen
- Born: 1764; Isle of Wight County, Virginia
- Died: July 16, 1849 (aged 84–85); Philadelphia, Pennsylvania
- Other names: Sara Allen and Mother Allen
- Occupation: Abolitionist

Sarah Allen (also known as Sara Allen and Mother Allen; née Bass; 1764 – July 16, 1849) was an American abolitionist and missionary for the African Methodist Episcopal Church. She is known within the AME Church as The Founding Mother.

== Early life ==
External videos
- Rev. Mark Kelly Tyler on Sarah Bass' Sense of Human Rights, 1:43, Philadelphia:The Great Experiment

Sarah Bass was born in 1764 in Isle of Wight County, Virginia, as a slave. When she was eight she was sent to Philadelphia, Pennsylvania. She was no longer enslaved as of 1800. That year she met Richard Allen, and they married by 1802. They had six children: Richard Jr., James, John, Peter, Sara, and Ann. Allen maintained the family finances and general homemaking tasks.

== Life in Philadelphia and founding of the AME Church ==
The family purchased property for $35 in Philadelphia that housed a blacksmith shop. The shop was planning to relocate following the purchase and the Allens used their team of horses to transport the shop to its new location. The property was eventually renovated and made into a church, which would become the founding African Methodist Episcopal Church.

Allen was highly involved in the AME Church, which her husband Richard founded. The family hid and cared for runaway slaves and their home was a part of the Underground Railroad. The couple used their home and the church to house enslaved people. By 1827, she had founded the Daughters of the Conference. The Daughters supported the male ministers of the AME Church. The women fed and cared for the generally poor and untidy ministers. The women also had a sewing circle to help mend and make clothes for the ministers.

== Later life ==
Allen died on July 16, 1849, at the house of her younger sister in Philadelphia. She is buried alongside her husband at Mother Bethel A.M.E. Church. The Daughters of the Conference was renamed Sarah Allen Women's Missionary Society.
