= Richard Allen Schools =

Charter school system in Ohio

Richard Allen Schools (RAS) is a charter school system headquartered in Dayton, Ohio. It operates schools in Dayton and Hamilton.

It was named after the founder of the African Methodist Episcopal Church (AME) and a former slave, Richard Allen.

== History ==
Jeanette Harris and Reverend Earl Harris established Richard Allen in August 1999 in Dayton. The first campus was in the Edgemont neighborhood. The former became the president and CEO of the school system.

For a period , the Institute of Management and Resources (IMR) operated the school, and Michelle Thomas served as the superintendent.

In 2008, the school system gave more than $1 million to consultancy firms established by Jeanette Harris; state taxpayers sent over $6.5 million to the system that year.

Dave Yost, the Ohio Auditor of State, ruled that Richard Allen paid $1.5 million in money to IMR in excess of what it should have; IMR sued Yost, but the 10th Ohio District Court of Appeals, on December 10, 2015, upheld the decision. A new audit in 2013 stated that IMR had overcharged an additional $452,281, meaning the total overspent funds were now $2.2 million.

In the summer of 2017, IMR stopped its operations of the schools, and IMR filed for bankruptcy in March 2018. Richard Allen became the sole charter school system operated by EDMG, established in April 2017.

In 2018, the Ohio Department of Education stated that it would no longer sponsor the school system.

In 2019, legal proceedings had been opened against both Thomas and IMR.

In 2025, an allegation was reported against Richard Allen Prep campus 3-8 stating that a male middle school teacher was inappropriately touching the female students and was placed on administrative leave until further notice. The district decided not to open an investigation in the school and left it up to the Dayton Police department to investigate the incident.

== Schools ==
- Richard Allen Preparatory (Dayton) – One K–3 campus and one 4–8 campus
  - As of 2018, the Dayton campuses had a total of about 500 students. The two buildings were both on Salem Avenue, with about 0.5 miles (0.80 km) between them. Previously the Dayton schools were organized as Richard Allen I, II and Prep.
- Richard Allen Academy (Hamilton) – K–6
  - As of 2018, it had 160 students. It was previously known as Richard Allen III.

== Student body ==
As of 2019, the school system had a total of 525 students. Previously it had a total enrollment of 964; its 2013 enrollment was around that size.

== Academic performance ==
In 2013, the Dayton campuses had academic performances superior to those of schools of Dayton Public Schools while the Hamilton campus had academic performances inferior to those of schools of the Hamilton City School District. In 2011, Christopher Magan and Margo Rutledge Kissell of the Dayton Daily News stated that the school system was "known for the type of strong academic performance that would make any urban educator envious."
