= Richard S. Newman =

American historian

Richard Newman is an American educator, author and historian of African American Studies. He is Professor of History at Rochester Institute of Technology and biographer of African Methodist Episcopal Church founder Richard Allen. His scholarly interests include African-American History, Atlantic History, environmental history and technology and history.

== Black Founding Fathers ==
Newman's work has reshaped both African-American History and Early American History by unpacking the ways in which revolutionary era blacks, in particular AME Church founder Richard Allen, contributed as "founding fathers." The major thrust of his biography of Richard Allen was to describe how Allen was able to create lasting black institutions, initiate a tradition of black prophetic leadership and precipitate civic institutions that came to define the Early American Republic. This historiographical emphasis coincides with a resurgence in scholarly interest in the white founders—those figures normally associated with the founding of the United States of America—challenging assumptions about the role of blacks in that process. Alan Taylor praised Freedom's Prophet for rescuing black agency and casting "African Americans as active makers of the American republic." On top of receiving high praise in reviews, Freedom's Prophet won ForeWord’s Book of the Year Gold Award for Biography in 2009.

== Books ==
- Love Canal: A Toxic History from Colonial Times to the Present, Oxford University Press, 2016
- Freedom’s Prophet: Richard Allen, the AME Church, and the Black Founding Fathers, New York University Press, 2008
- The Transformation of American Abolitionism: Fighting Slavery in the Early Republic, University of North Carolina Press, 2002
- Race in the Atlantic World, 1700-1900, University of Georgia Press, series 2007–present, with Patrick Rael and Manisha Sinha
- Pamphlets of Protest: An Anthology of Early African-American Protest Literature, 1790-1860, Routledge, 2001, with Phillip Lapsansky and Patrick Rael
- "The Palgrave Environmental Reader", Palgrave Macmillan, 2001, with Dan Payne.

== Articles ==
- "Black Founders in the New Republic: Introduction", The William and Mary Quarterly, 2007, with Roy E. Finkenbine.
