= Mother Bethel A.M.E. Church =

Historic church in Pennsylvania, United States

- Mother Bethel African Methodist Episcopal Church
- U.S. National Register of Historic Places
- U.S. National Historic Landmark
- Pennsylvania state historical marker
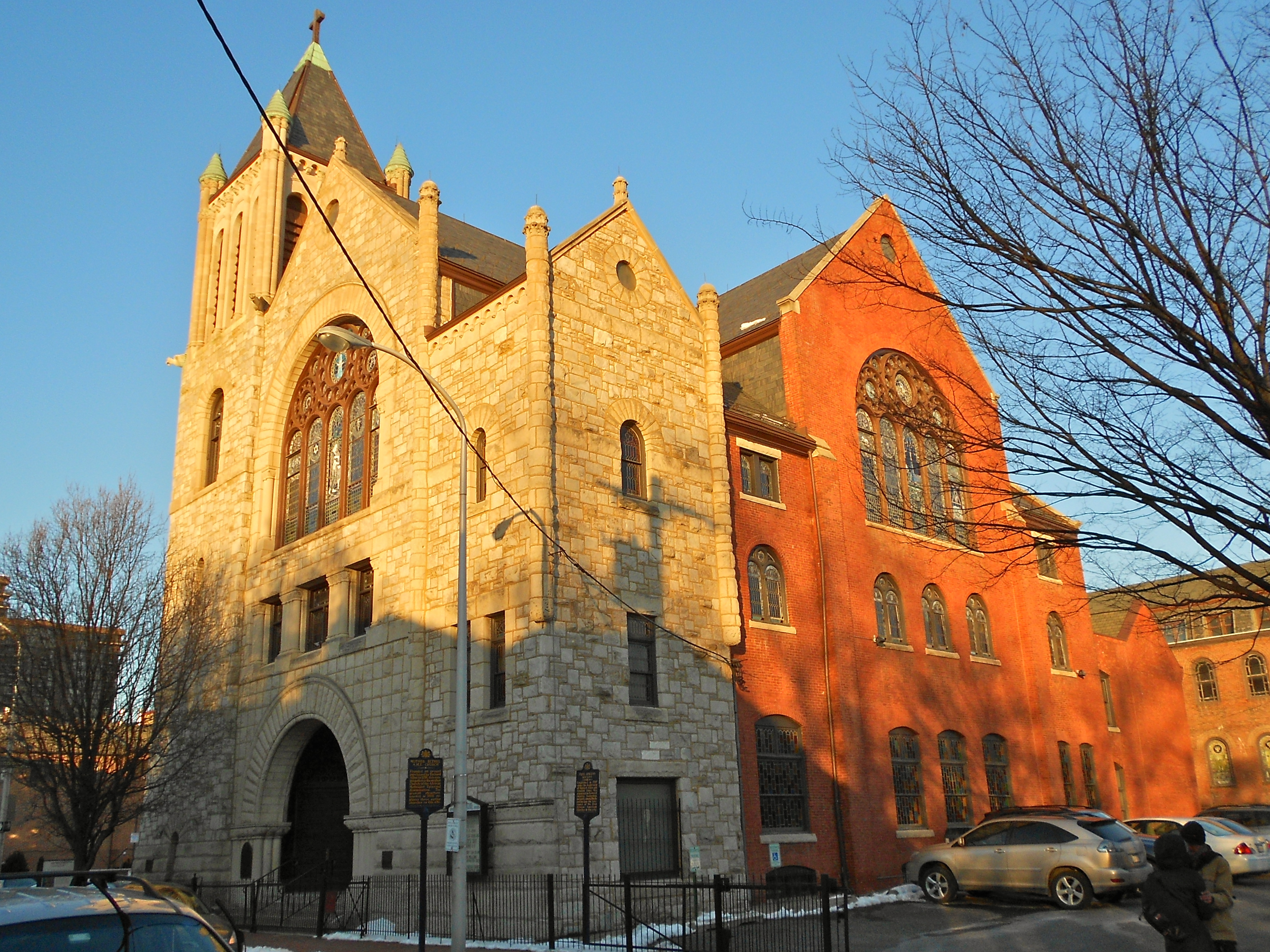

- Location within Philadelphia Location within Pennsylvania Location within the United States
- Location: 419 S. 6th Street, Philadelphia, Pennsylvania
- Coordinates: 39.94332°N 75.15186°W
- Built: 1890
- Architectural style: Romanesque
- NRHP reference No.: 72001166

Significant dates
- Added to NRHP: March 16, 1972
- Designated PHMC: March 19, 1991

The Mother Bethel African Methodist Episcopal Church is a historic church and congregation which is located at 419 South 6th Street in Center City Philadelphia, Pennsylvania, USA. The congregation, founded in 1794, is the oldest African Methodist Episcopal congregation in the nation.

Its present church, completed in 1890, is the oldest church property in the United States to be continuously owned by African Americans. It was designated a National Historic Landmark in 1972.

== History of the congregation ==
External videos
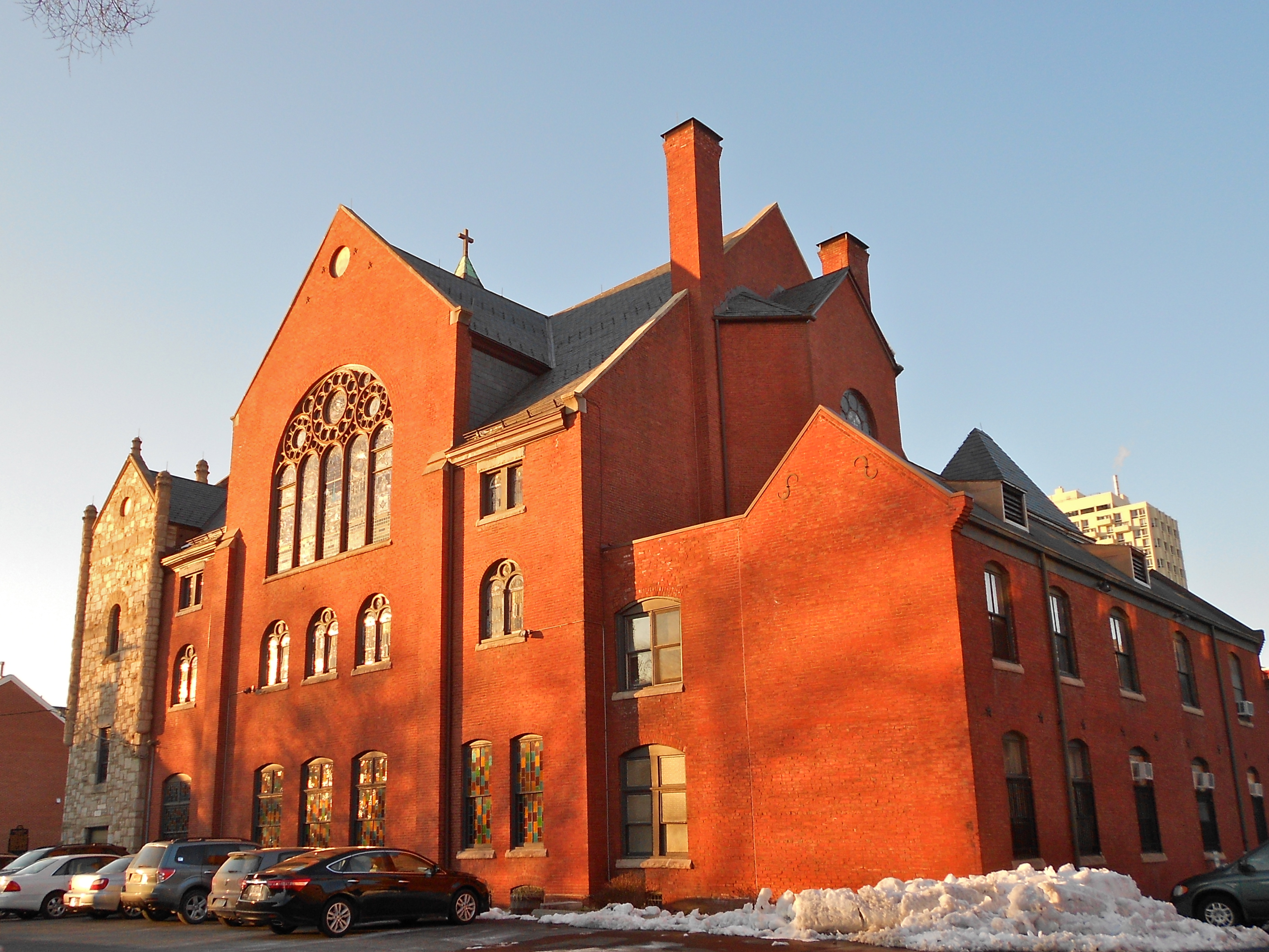
- Mother Bethel AME Church - Philadelphia, PA, Wanda Kaluza, 2:54

The church was proposed in 1791 by members of the Free African Society of Philadelphia, including Absalom Jones, out of a desire to create a space for autonomous African-American worship and community in the city. The desire to create the church was strengthened in 1792, after African-American members of St. George's Methodist Church walked out due to racial segregation in the worship services. Leading roles in the founding were played by Richard Allen, who arranged the purchase of the church's site and its construction, and Absalom Jones, who raised funds among both black and white Philadelphia residents (including then-President George Washington). Mother Bethel was one of the first African-American churches in the United States, dedicated July 29, 1794, by Bishop Francis Asbury.

On October 12, 1794, Reverend Robert Blackwell announced that the congregation was received in full fellowship in the Methodist Episcopal Church.

In 1816, Rev. Richard Allen brought together other black Methodist congregations from the region to organize the new African Methodist Episcopal Church denomination. He was elected bishop of this denomination. After the American Civil War, its missionaries went to the South to help freedmen and planted many new churches in the region.

In 1838, the building was damaged during the riots that followed the destruction of Pennsylvania Hall.

Allen and his wife, Sarah Allen are both buried in the present church's crypt. The current church building was constructed in 1888–1890, and it has been designated a National Historic Landmark.

On October 25, 2009, "The Great Gathering" took place at St. George's Church in which the community of Mother Bethel AME and St. George's congregations gathered for Sunday worship at St. George's for the first time since the historic walkout. The Rev. Dr. Mark Kelly Tyler preached for this service.

== Building history ==
The property was acquired for the new congregation in 1794. Its first building was a frame structure originally used as a blacksmith's shop, which was hauled to the site.

This building was later replaced by frame structures in 1805 and 1841. The 1841 church was reported to have a tunnel connecting it with a nearby Quaker meetinghouse to facilitate the movements of fugitive slaves.

The present building, which was completed in 1890, is a three-story masonry structure with Romanesque styling. Its large round-arch windows are adorned with stained glass from Germany.

== Gallery ==
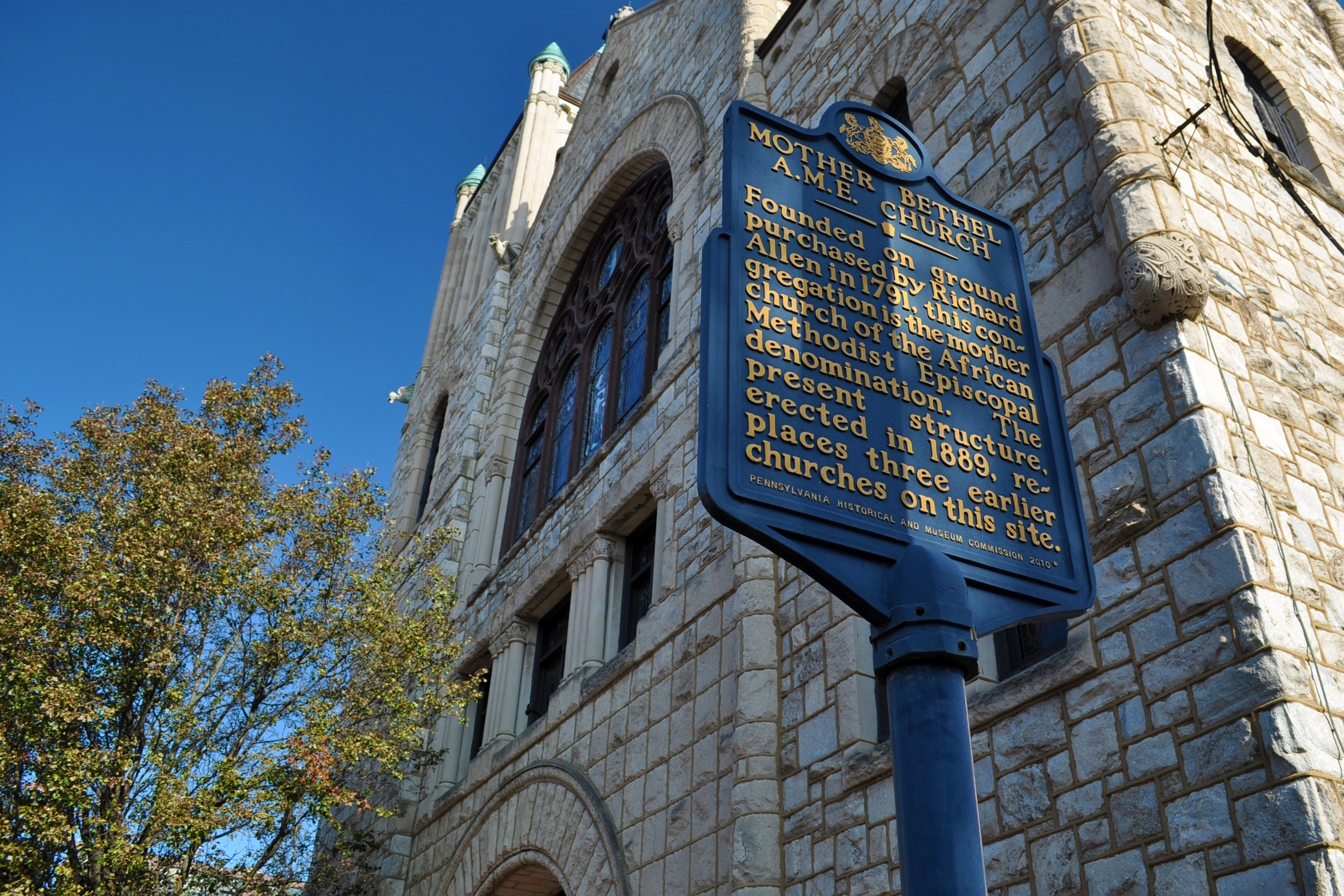
Mother Bethel A.M.E. Church Historical Marker

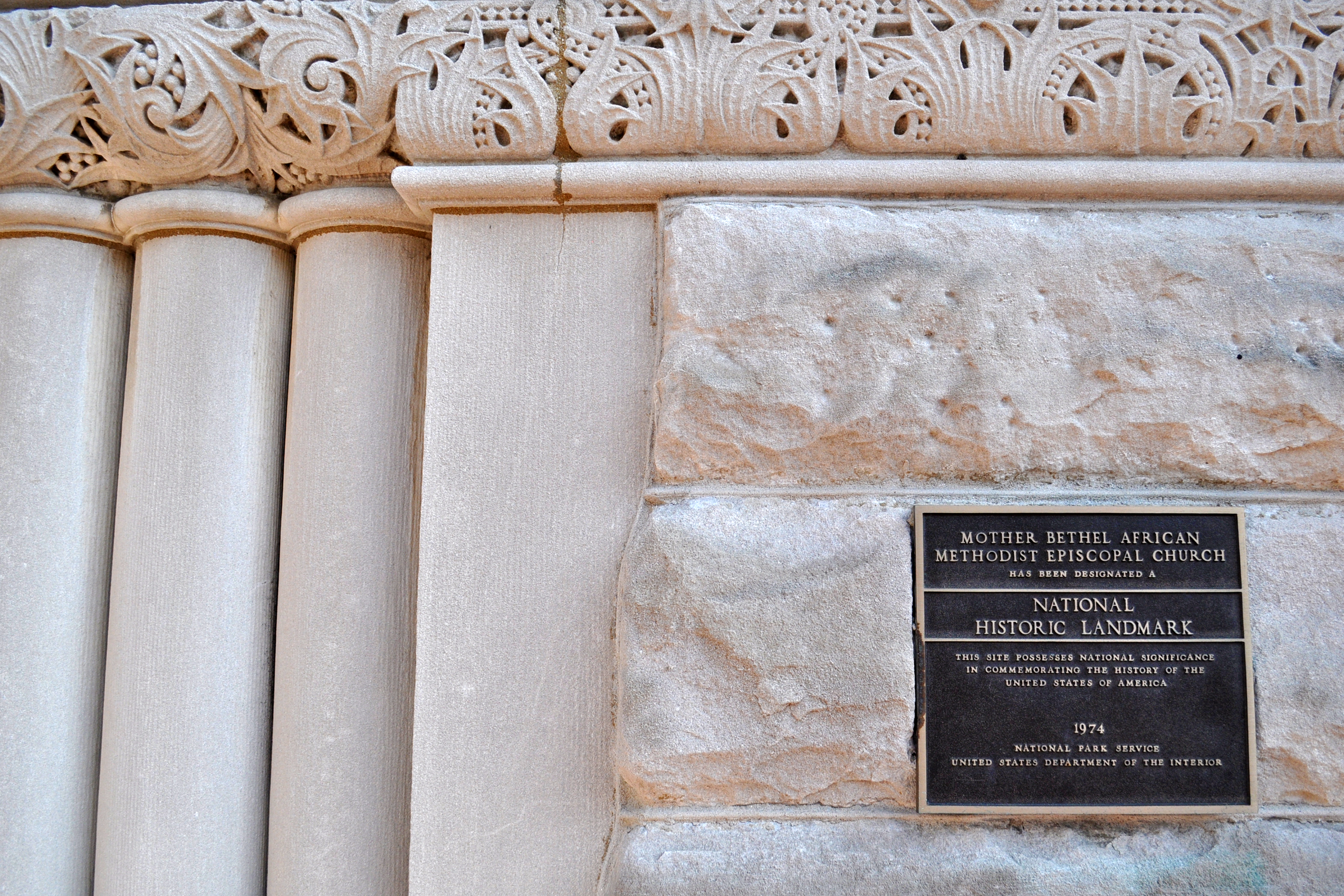
National Historic Landmark Plaque

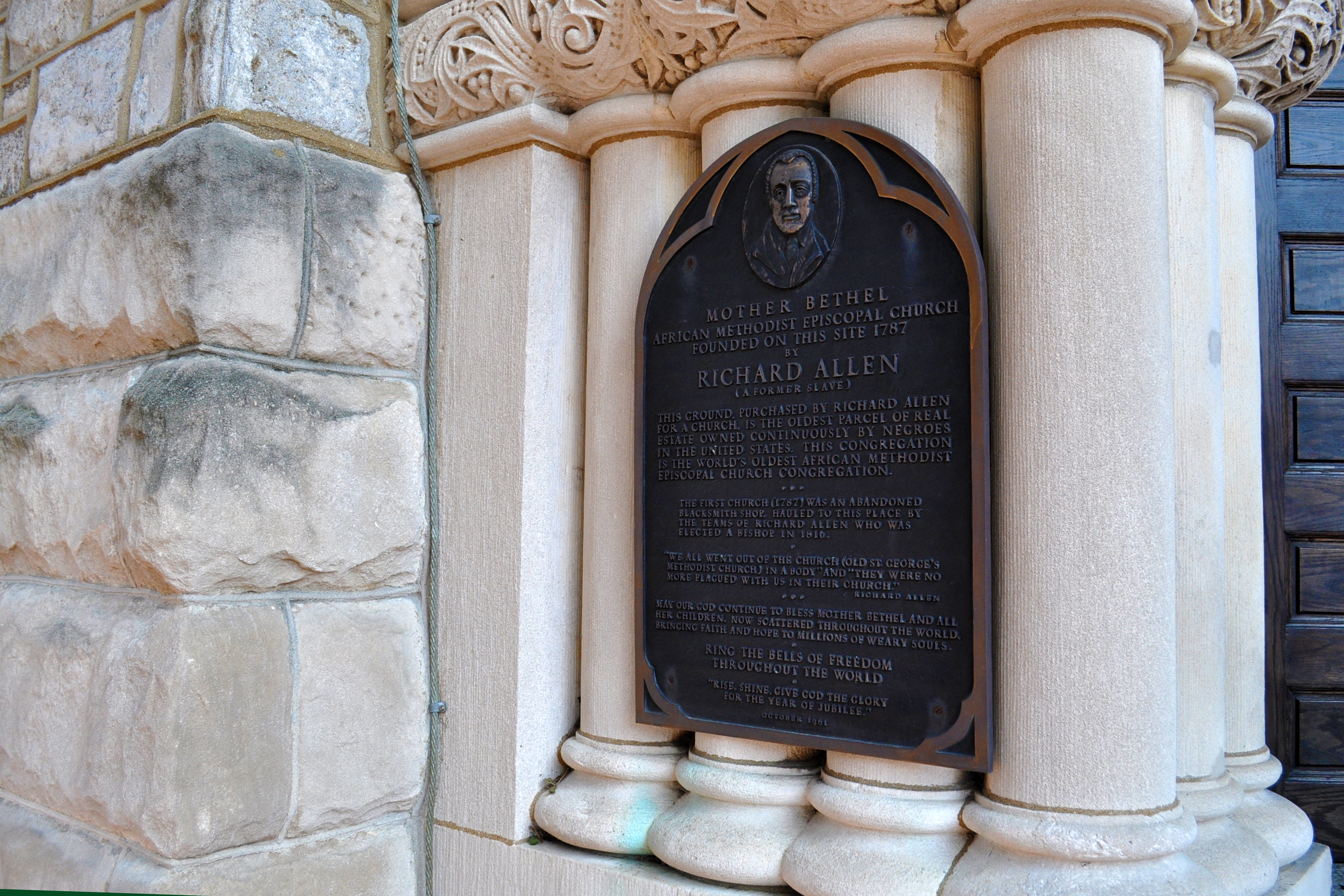
Richard Allen Historic Plaque

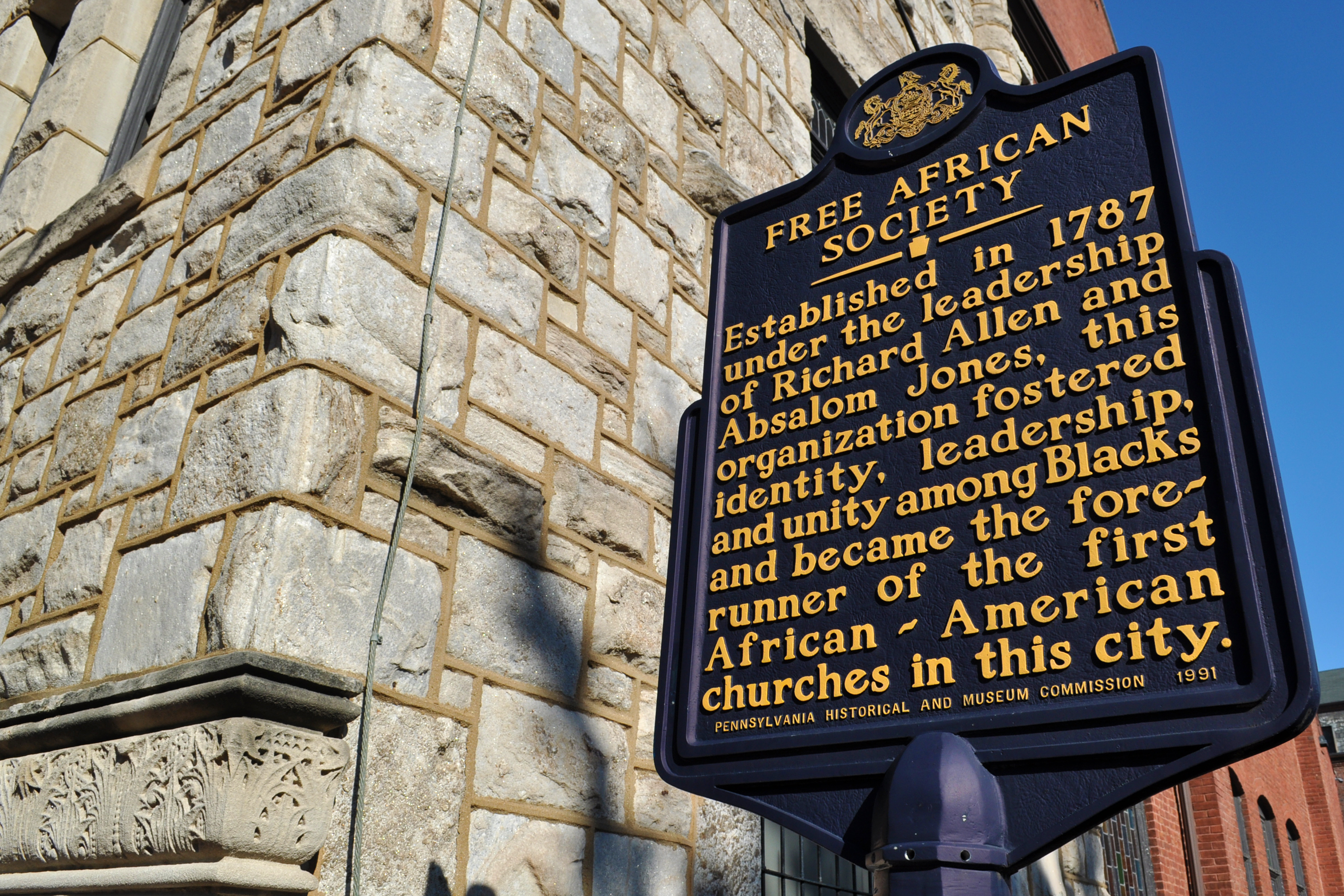
Free African Society Historical Marker

== See also ==
- List of African-American firsts
- List of Pennsylvania firsts
- Daniel Coker
- List of National Historic Landmarks in Philadelphia
- National Register of Historic Places listings in Center City, Philadelphia
- History of African Americans in Philadelphia

== Relevant literature ==
- Singler, John Victor. 2022. "African American language and life in the antebellum North: Philadelphia’s Mother Bethel Church." In Bettina Migge & Shelome Gooden (eds.), Social and structural aspects of language contact and change, 67–101. Berlin: Language Science Press. DOI: 10.5281/zenodo.6979331. Open access online.
