= Richard Allen (bishop) =

American educator, author, minister, and black leader (1760–1831)

The Right Reverend Richard Allen
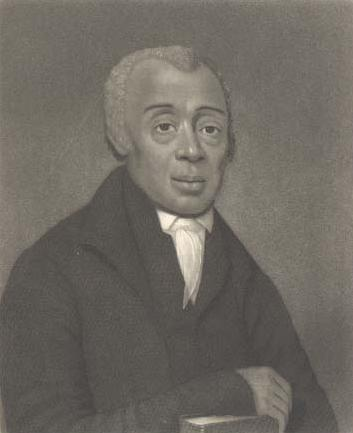
- Church: African Methodist Episcopal Church
- Installed: April 10, 1816
- Term ended: March 26, 1831
- Predecessor: Formed denomination
- Successor: Morris Brown

Orders
- Ordination: 1799 by Francis Asbury

Personal details
- Born: February 14, 1760 Delaware Colony, British America
- Died: March 26, 1831 (aged 71) Philadelphia, Pennsylvania, U.S.
- Buried: Mother Bethel AME Church, Philadelphia, Pennsylvania, United States
- Denomination: African Methodist Episcopal Church
- Spouse: Flora, Sarah Bass
- Children: Richard Jr., James, John, Peter, Sara, and Ann
- Occupation: Founder of the African Methodist Episcopal church, minister, abolitionist, educator, writer, and one of America's most active and influential black leaders

Richard Allen (February 14, 1760 – March 26, 1831) was an American minister, educator, writer, and one of the United States' most active and influential black leaders. One of America's Black Founding Fathers, he is known for having founded the African Methodist Episcopal Church (AME), the first independent Black denomination in the United States in 1794.

Elected the first bishop of the AME Church in 1816, Allen focused on organizing a denomination in which free black people could worship without racial oppression and enslaved people could find a measure of dignity. He worked to upgrade the social status of the black community, organizing Sabbath schools to teach literacy and promoting national organizations to develop political strategies. Allen said, "We will never separate ourselves voluntarily from the slave population in this country; they are our brethren, and we feel there is more virtue in suffering privations with them than a fancied advantage for a season." The AME Church proliferated among the freed blacks in the Southern United States.

== Early life and freedom ==
He was born into slavery on February 14, 1760, on the Delaware property of Benjamin Chew. When he was a child, Allen and his family were sold to Stokley Sturgis, who had a plantation. Because of financial problems, he sold Richard's mother and two of his four siblings. Allen had an older brother and sister left with him, and the three began to attend meetings of the local Methodist Society, which was welcoming to enslaved and free Black people. They were encouraged by their enslaver, Sturgis, although he was unconverted. Richard taught himself to read and write. He joined the Methodists at 17. He began evangelizing, attracting criticism and anger from local enslavers.

Allen and his brother then redoubled their efforts for Sturgis to deflect criticism of religion's influence on enslaved people.

The Reverend Freeborn Garrettson, who, in 1775, had freed the people he had enslaved, began to preach in Delaware. He was among many Methodist and Baptist ministers who encouraged enslavers to emancipate the people they enslaved after the American Revolutionary War. When Garrettson visited the Sturgis plantation to preach, Allen's master was persuaded that slavery was wrong, and offered enslaved people an opportunity to buy their freedom. Allen performed extra work to earn money and bought his freedom in 1780. He then changed his name from "Negro Richard" to "Richard Allen".

== Marriage and family ==
Allen's first wife was named Flora. They were married on October 19, 1790. She worked very closely with him during the early years of establishing the church, from 1787 to 1799. They attended church school and worked together, purchasing land donated to the church or rented out to families. Flora died on March 11, 1801, after a long illness. Scholars do not know if they had any children. After moving to Philadelphia, Allen married Sarah Bass, a formerly enslaved person from Virginia. She had moved to Philadelphia as a child, and the couple met around 1800. Richard and Sarah Allen had six children. Sarah Allen was highly active in what became the AME Church and is called the "Founding Mother".

== Ministry ==
Allen was qualified as a preacher and admitted in December 1784 at the famous "Christmas Conference", the founding and considered to be the first General Conference of the Methodist Episcopal Church in North America. Held at the old original Lovely Lane Chapel meeting house on the narrow lane off modern South Calvert and German (now Redwood) Streets in old Baltimore Town, (now Downtown Baltimore), largest town/city and port in Maryland. He was one of the two Black attendees of the Conference along with legendary Harry ("Black Harry") Hosier, (c. 1750 – 1806), but neither could vote during deliberations in Lovely Lane. Allen was then allowed to lead services at 5 a.m., mainly attended by Black people. But as preacher Allen had family responsibilities, eschewing future Bishop Francis Asbury (1745–1816), Irishman Robert Strawbridge (c. 1732 – c. 1781?), and "Black Harry" Hosier's practices of horseback circuit riding routes to rural country churches and "Bible stations", visiting far off parsons and "living in the saddle", so he moved northeast to Philadelphia, a center of free Black people and the biggest city in the new United States and second only to London in the English-speaking world.

Two years later, in 1786, Allen became a preacher and leader among African-American believers who attended St. George's Methodist Episcopal Church in Philadelphia but was restricted to the early-morning services and advocated to his hearers for a separate congregation. As he attracted more Black congregants and differences in worship practice developed, the church vestry ordered them to sit in the gallery instead of along the wall of the prayer hall. The following year his followers formed the 'Free African Society' and with the aid of a couple of sympathetic white believers commenced the fund-raising for a new building. Allen regularly preached on the commons (central park) near the church, slowly gaining a congregation of nearly 50 and supporting himself with a variety of odd jobs.

Allen and Absalom Jones, also a Methodist preacher, resented the white congregants' leaders' segregation of blacks for worship and prayer. They left St. George's to create an independent, self-reliant worship place for African Americans in the large cosmopolitan capital city. Unfortunately, that brought on some opposition from the white church as well as the more established Black people of the community who wanted to merely "fit in" or not stir up any hard feelings.

In protest in 1787 (the same famous summer with the Constitutional Convention holding locked-in sessions in the old Pennsylvania State House, now frequently called "Independence Hall", with delegates from the "13 Original States"), Allen and Jones led the Black members out of the St. George's Methodist Episcopal Church. They formed the Free African Society (F.A.S.), a non-denominational mutual aid society that assisted fugitive enslaved people from the Southern United States and new migrants coming into the city of Philadelphia. Allen and Absalom Jones, William Gray, and William Wilcher found an available lot on Sixth Street near Lombard Street. Allen negotiated a price and purchased this lot in 1787 to build a church, but it was several years before they had a building. Now occupied by Mother Bethel African Methodist Episcopal Church, it is the oldest parcel of real estate in the United States that has been owned continuously by African Americans. This sequence is depicted in the landmark short docudrama "Apostle of Freedom" starring actor Leonard Dozier and produced by Mother Bethel AME Church and History Making Productions.

Over time, most of the F.A.S. members chose to return to the spiritual home of their youth and forefathers and affiliate with the neighborhood parishes of the former Church of England as it slowly recovered from the wartime bitterness of the Revolution after the British ministry government ending the War in the Treaty of Paris ratified in 1783 by the Confederation Congress in Annapolis. The Anglicans, which had reorganized themselves in a newly independent America now after the Peace in 1785 with nine dioceses on the East Coast / Atlantic Ocean shores meeting and uniting in their first General Convention as renamed "The Protestant Episcopal Church in the United States of America" (later known simply today as "The Episcopal Church, U.S.A."), with the old familiar Elizabethan era old English texts in the "Book of Common Prayer", with some minor revisions in the first American edition of 1789, replacing prayers for His Royal Majesty, the King, and ministers to those for the new president, members of the Congress, Governors and lawful state Commonwealth officials. Many Black people and "Methodists" in Philadelphia had been Anglicans since the 1740s. It was only during the American Revolutionary War (1775–1783) and with the part-time occupation of Philadelphia as the "Patriots" / rebels' capital by the British Army that drove out most of the old English/British ministers of the old Anglican faith (priests)

External audio
- "Calamity in Philadelphia", Distillations podcast about Richard Allen and his work in the 1793 Yellow Fever epidemic.

During the 1793 yellow fever epidemic, Richard Allen and Absalom Jones helped to organize free blacks as essential workers to care for the sick and deal with the dead. They were appealed to by respected physician Benjamin Rush. Amid fierce debates over the causes of the disease and its potential for contagion, Rush incorrectly believed that yellow fever was not contagious and that it would be less likely to affect people of color. Allen himself worked with the sick and dying, caught yellow fever, and nearly died. In the fall of 1793, the epidemic eased as temperatures dropped and the mosquitoes that carried the disease died. In 1794, Allen and Jones published and copyrighted the pamphlet A narrative of the proceedings of the black people, during the late awful calamity in Philadelphia, in the year 1793: and a refutation of some censures, thrown upon them in some late publications. They confronted accounts of the epidemic that accused the black community of being greedy opportunists, and that perpetuated the myth that African Americans had not been affected by the disease.

Allen and others founded the African Church with Absalom Jones leading services and preaching the Word. It was accepted as a parish congregation and opened its doors on July 17, 1794, known as the "African Episcopal Church of St. Thomas". The following year, 1795, the now Rev. Mr. Absalom Jones was ordained as a Deacon (one of the earliest in American Episcopal/Anglican Church history), and nine years later, in 1804, he became the first Black person ordained in the United States as a Priest / Presbyter (Pastor) of The Episcopal Church, U.S.A.

Allen and others wanted to continue in the more straightforward and more evangelical Methodist practices inspired by George Whitefield, John Wesley, and his brother Charles Wesley. Practices and traditions that had initially been brought from England by Francis Asbury, Robert Strawbridge and interpreted in America by Daniel Coke, Daniel Alexander Payne. Allen called their congregation the African Methodist Episcopal Church (A.M.E.), and over time, it became known as "Mother Bethel" Church. Converting a blacksmith shop on Sixth Street, the leaders opened the doors of Bethel A.M.E. Church on July 29, 1794. At first, it was affiliated with the larger Methodist Episcopal Church, as organized in Baltimore in 1784. The Philadelphia congregation had to rely on visiting white ministers to consecrate the bread and wine / sacred elements in the Sunday worship service of Holy Communion / "Eucharist. Otherwise, as a Deacon, he could lead services reading the Scriptures, preaching sermons, and leading the assembled prayers and intercessions; in recognition of his leadership and preaching, Allen was ordained as the first Black Methodist minister/elder by Bishop Francis Asbury of the M.E. Church in 1799. He and the "Mother Bethel" congregation still had to continue to negotiate with white oversight and deal with white elders of the predominantly white Methodist Episcopal Church denomination. A decade after its founding, the Bethel A.M.E. Church of Philadelphia had 457 members, and by 1813, it had risen amazingly to 1,272.

In April 1816, 22 years after the organizing of "Mother Bethel" congregation in 1794, Rev. Allen called for a general conference meeting in Philadelphia and proposed the uniting of the five African-American congregations then existing in the eastern areas of the Methodist Episcopal Church in Philadelphia; Langhorne/Attleborough, Pennsylvania; Salem, New Jersey; Delaware and Baltimore, Maryland. Together, they founded the independent denomination of the A.M.E. Church, the first fully independent Black denomination in the United States. On April 10, 1816, the other ministers elected Allen as their first Bishop, and he served in the episcopal office for 15 years until his passing, but 37 years total ministering to "Mother Bethel" of Philadelphia. The African Methodist Episcopal Church is Black America's oldest and largest formal institution.

From 1797 until his 1831 death, Bishop Allen and his wife Sarah operated a station in the "City of Brotherly Love" on the Underground Railroad on the East Coast line for fugitive enslaved people fleeing from further south in the slave and border states of Delaware, Maryland, Virginia, North Carolina, and South Carolina.

== Preaching ==
The social themes of Bishop Allen's preaching were abolition, colonization, education, and temperance. The preaching style was rarely expository or written to be read, but the subject was delivered in an evangelical and extemporized manner that demanded action rather than meditation. The tone was persuasive, not didactic.

== Activism outside the church ==
Richard Allen was active in the Philadelphia abolitionist movement. In December 1799, Richard Allen, Absalom Jones, and sixty-nine other Black Philadelphians sent a petition to Congress urging the end of the international slave trade and a gradual emancipation plan. The petition also addressed the rights of free black men. The signers asserted the citizenship of Black Americans and demanded protection against kidnapping under the Fugitive Slave Act. As many states denied Black Americans the right to testify in court, those accused of being runaway slaves often had no legal redress. (Richard Allen himself had been accused of being a runaway slave in 1786, but fortunately had white Philadelphian allies who were willing to testify on his behalf.) Congress rejected their petition. Enslavers objected to emancipation, and some non-slave owners such as Harrison Gray Otis saw the petition itself as fraudulent, arguing that Black Americans were "incapable of writing their names, or of reading the petition..."

Also in 1799, Richard Allen and Absalom Jones co-published a pamphlet, considered the first Black publication in America, defending the prices Black caregivers had charged for nursing during the 1793 Philadelphia yellow fever epidemic. Allen promoted racial vindication, the idea that blacks needed to prove themselves equal. Racial vindication was positive for encouraging personal responsibility, but it shifted the responsibility to blacks to judge themselves by the standard decided by whites, even if that was unfairly negative, because Allen was optimistic that an appeal to reason could overcome prejudice. However, the yellow fever scandal showed that prejudice is not easily overcome, and Allen was genuinely incensed by the accusations that blacks were plundering the dead.

In September 1830, Black representatives from seven states convened in Philadelphia at the Bethel AME church for the first Negro Convention. The civic meeting was the first organized by African-American leaders on such a large scale. Allen presided over the meeting, which addressed both regional and national topics. The convention occurred after the 1826 and 1829 riots in Cincinnati when whites had attacked Black people and destroyed their businesses. After the 1829 rioting, 1,200 Black people had left the city to go to Canada. As a result, the Negro Convention addressed organizing aid to such settlements in Canada, among other issues. The 1830 meeting was the beginning of an organizational effort known as the Negro Convention Movement, part of 19th-century institution building in the Black community. Conventions were held regularly nationally.

Allen was a Prince Hall Freemason and served as the first Grand Treasurer of the Grand Lodge of Pennsylvania, Prince Hall.

== Death ==
Allen died at home on Spruce Street on March 26, 1831. He was buried at the church that he founded. His grave remains on the lower level.

== Legacy and honors ==
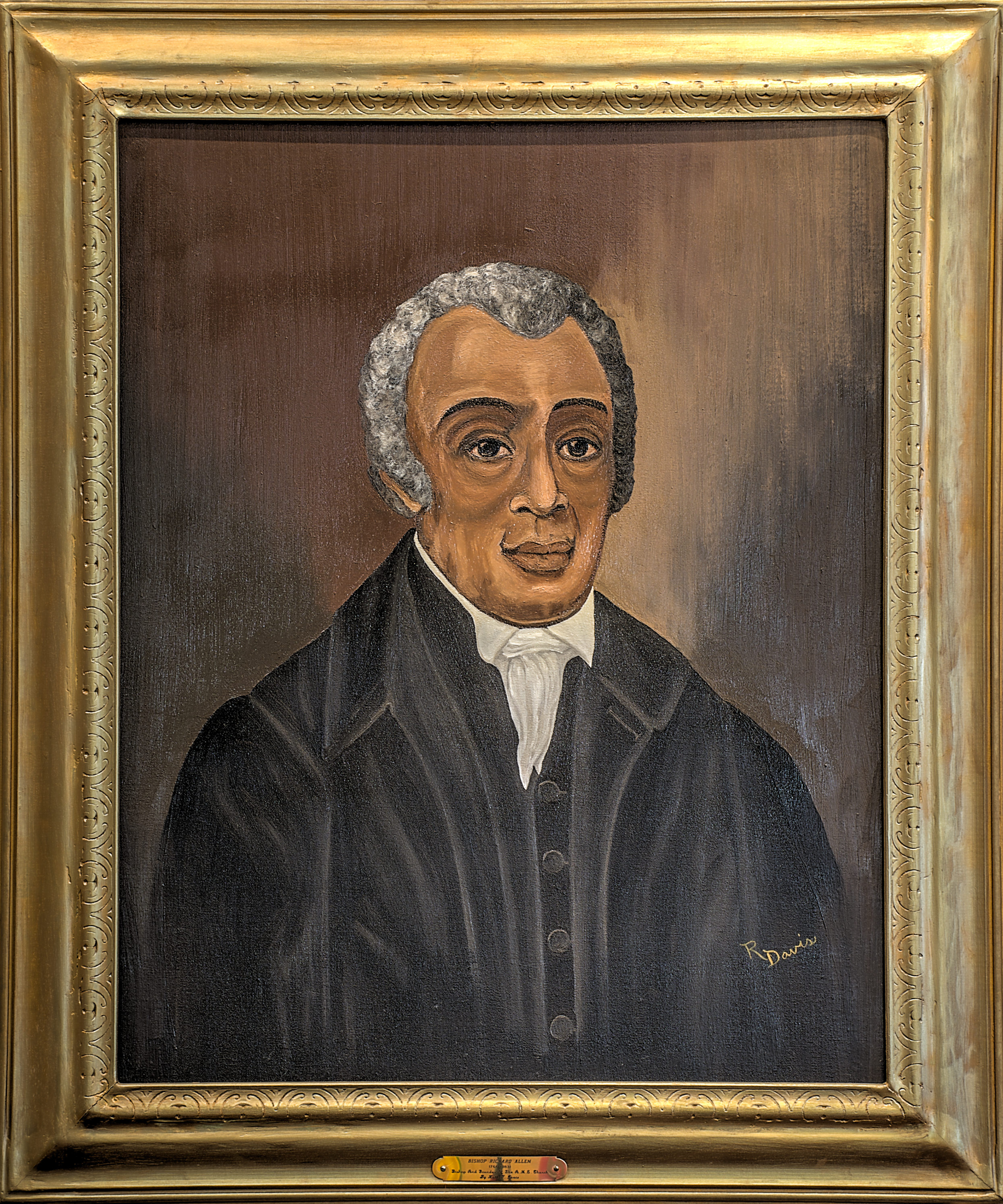
Painting of Allen on display at the World Methodist Museum, Lake Junaluska, North Carolina

- In 1949, Allen's story was featured in the radio drama Destination Freedom episode "Apostle of Freedom", written by Richard Durham.
- In 2001, the Richard Allen Preparatory School, a charter school, was opened in his name in southwestern Philadelphia.
- Richard Allen Schools, a charter school system in Ohio, is named after him
- In 2002, Molefi Kete Asante named Allen as one of the 100 Greatest African Americans.
- In 2010, a park in the Philadelphia suburb of Radnor Township was named for him.
- The Richard Allen Homes, a public housing project in Philadelphia, were named for him.
- A street in Cambridge, Massachusetts, is named after him, which in turn lent its name to indie rock band Bishop Allen.
- Allen University, a historically Black university in South Carolina, was renamed in Allen's honor when it moved from Cokesbury to Columbia in 1880.
- A stamp honoring Allen was issued by the United States Postal Service in February 2016, with a first-day ceremony in Philadelphia, as part of the ongoing Black Heritage Series.
- Mother Bethel Church erected a life-sized statue of Allen by Fern Cunningham-Terry on July 10, 2016.
- A mural, The Legacy of Bishop Richard Allen and AME Church Mural, was unveiled on July 4, 2016, at 38th and Market Streets in West Philadelphia.
- On February 14, 2022, Allens Lane in Philadelphia's Mt. Airy neighborhood was re-attributed to Richard Allen by resolution of the city's council, facilitated by the efforts of State Rep. Chris Rabb (PA House 200th). A re-attribution of Septa's Allen Lane station is also contemplated.
- On February 1, 2022, Penguin Random House published the audiobook of Dr.Richard Newman's official biography on Richard Allen titled "Freedom's Prophet," narrated by actor and voice actor Leonard Dozier.https://www.penguinrandomhouse.com/books/710129/freedoms-prophet-by-richard-s-newman/

== See also ==
- African American founding fathers of the United States – Activists for legal equality and human liberty
- Jarena Lee – American preacher (1783–1864)
- Second Great Awakening – 19th-century US religious revival

== Sources ==
- George, Carol V.R. (1973). Segregated Sabbaths; Richard Allen and the Emergence of Independent Black Churches 1760–1840. New York: Oxford University Press., scholarly biography
- Wesley, Charles H. (1935) Richard Allen: Apostle of Freedom, Associated Publishers, Inc.
- Who Was Who in America: Historical Volume, 1607–1896. Chicago: Marquis Who's Who, 1967.
- Newman, Richard S. (2008). Freedom's Prophet: Bishop Richard Allen, the AME Church, and the Black Founding Fathers. New York: New York University Press. ISBN 978-0-8147-5826-7.
