= Absalom Jones =

American abolitionist and clergyman (1746–1818)

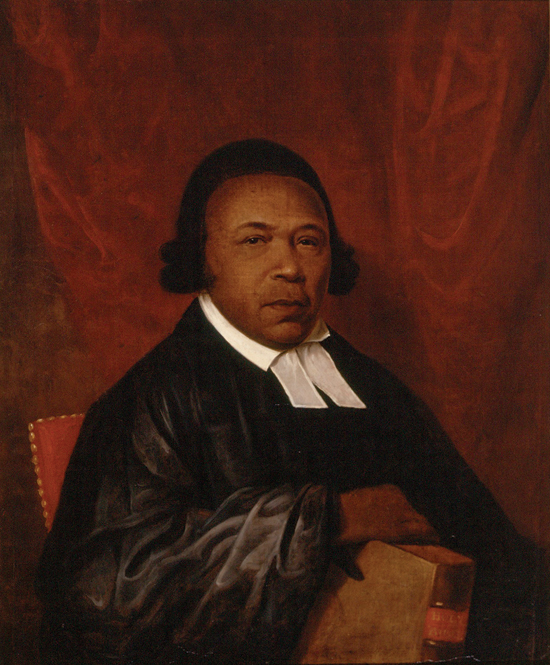
- 1810 portrait of Jones by Raphaelle Peale
- Born: November 7, 1746; Sussex County, Delaware Colony
- Died: February 13, 1818 (aged 71); Philadelphia, Pennsylvania, US
- Occupation: Clergyman (Anglican/Episcopal Church)
- Known for: Anti-slavery petitioner
- Spouse: Mary King
- Relatives: Julian Abele (architect)

Absalom Jones (November 7, 1746 – February 13, 1818) was an American abolitionist and clergyman who became prominent in Philadelphia, Pennsylvania. Disappointed at the racial discrimination he experienced in a local Methodist church, he founded the Free African Society with Richard Allen in 1787, a mutual aid society for black Americans in the city. The Free African Society included many people newly freed from slavery after the American Revolutionary War.

In 1794, Jones founded the first Black Episcopal congregation, and in 1802, he was the first African American to be ordained as a priest in the Episcopal Church of the United States. He is listed on the Episcopal calendar of saints. He is remembered liturgically on the date of his death, February 13, in the 1979 Book of Common Prayer as "Absalom Jones, Priest, 1818".

== Early life ==
Absalom Jones was born into slavery in Sussex County, Delaware, in 1746. When he was sixteen, his enslaver sold him, his mother, and his siblings to a neighboring farmer. That year, the farmer kept Absalom but sold his mother and siblings and moved to Philadelphia, Pennsylvania, where he became a merchant. Absalom was allowed to attend Benezet's School, where he learned to read and write. While still enslaved by Mr. Wynkop (who was a vestryman of Christ Church and later St. Peter's), Absalom married Mary King (an enslaved woman owned by S. King, a neighbor to the Wynkoops), on January 4, 1770. the Rev. Jacob Duché performed the wedding ceremony.

By 1778, Absalom had purchased his wife's freedom so their children would be free; he asked for aid by donations and loans. (According to colonial law, children took the status of their mother, so children born to enslaved women were enslaved from birth.) Absalom also wrote to his enslaver seeking his freedom but was initially denied. Later, Jones applied for his freedom for the second time. Finally, on October 1, 1784, inspired by revolutionary ideals, Wynkoop manumitted Absalom. Absalom adopted the surname "Jones" as an indication of his American identity.

After being released from slavery, Absalom was ordained as a priest in September 1802. This made him the first Black person to be ordained in America by a well-known religion.

== Methodist Church ==
Around 1780, a Methodist movement was sweeping through the colonies as part of the Second Great Awakening. It came at a time of revolutionary ferment in the closing period of the American Revolutionary War. The movement was especially popular in New York, Baltimore, and Philadelphia. Methodists had developed in Great Britain as evangelicals within the Church of England. In December 1784, Thomas Coke and Francis Asbury established the Methodist Episcopal Church as a new denomination, separate from the Church of England.

== Ministerial career ==
Pennsylvania abolished slavery and became a free state in the new United States. Jones became a lay minister of the interracial congregation of St. George's Methodist Episcopal Church in Philadelphia. The Methodist church admitted persons of all races and allowed African Americans to preach. Together with Richard Allen, Jones was one of the first African Americans licensed to preach by the Methodist Episcopal Church.

However, members of the church still practiced racial discrimination. In 1792, while at St. George's Methodist Episcopal Church, Absalom Jones and other African American members were told that they could not join the rest of the congregation in seating and kneeling on the first floor and instead had to be segregated first sitting against the wall and then in the gallery or balcony. After their prayer, Jones and most of the church's African-American members got up and walked out.

Jones and Allen founded the Free African Society (FAS), first conceived as a non-denominational mutual aid society, to help newly freed people in Philadelphia. Jones and Allen later separated, as their religious lives took different directions after 1794. They remained lifelong friends and collaborators as well as members of Prince Hall Freemasonry.

As 1791 began, Jones started holding religious services at FAS, which became the core of his African Church in Philadelphia the following year. Jones wanted to establish an African-American congregation independent of Caucasian control while remaining part of the Episcopal Church. After a successful petition, the African Episcopal Church of St. Thomas, the first Black church in Philadelphia, opened its doors on July 17, 1794. Jones was ordained as a deacon in 1795 and as a priest in 1802, became the first African-American priest in the Episcopal Church.

A month after St. Thomas church opened, the Founders and Trustees published "The Causes and Motives for Establishing St. Thomas's African Church of Philadelphia," saying their intent was "to arise out of the dust and shake ourselves, and throw off that servile fear, that the habit of oppression and bondage trained us up in."

Famous for his oratory, Jones helped establish the tradition of anti-slavery sermons on New Year's Day. His sermon for January 1, 1808, the date on which the U.S. Constitution mandated the end of the African slave trade, was called "A Thanksgiving Sermon" and published in pamphlet form. It became famous. Rumors persisted that Jones had supernatural abilities to influence the minds of assembled congregations. Caucasian observers failed to recognize his oratory skills, perhaps because they believed rhetoric to be beyond the capabilities of people of African descent. Numerous other African-American leaders were similarly said to have supernatural abilities.

== Fugitive Slave Act of 1793 ==
In 1775, the state of North Carolina had made it illegal to free enslaved people unless approved by a county court, a provision largely ignored by members of the Society of Friends (Quakers). They not only continued to free the people they enslaved but, in some cases, bought enslaved people from other men to free them. In 1788, the North Carolina legislature passed a law allowing the capture and sale of any formerly enslaved person freed without court approval, with twenty percent of the sale price going as a reward to the person who reported the illegal manumission. Many freed African Americans fled the state to avoid being captured and sold back into slavery.

After becoming the first Black and freedman to be ordained as a priest, and as the Constitution's deadline for abolition of the slave trade passed, Jones took part in the first group of African Americans to petition the U.S. Congress. Their petition related to the Fugitive Slave Act of 1793, which they criticized for encouraging cruelty and brutality, as well as supporting the continuing criminal practice of kidnapping free Blacks and selling them into slavery. Jones drafted a petition on behalf of four formerly enslaved people and asked Congress to adopt "some remedy for an evil of such magnitude."

The petition was presented on 30 January 1797 by U.S. Representative John Swanwick of Pennsylvania. Jones used moral suasion: trying to convince whites that slavery was immoral, offensive to God, and contrary to the nation's ideal. Although U.S. Representative George Thatcher of Massachusetts argued that the petition should be accepted and referred to the Committee on the Fugitive Law, the House of Representatives declined to accept the petition by a vote of 50 to 33. Jones submitted a similar petition two years later, which was also declined.

== African Methodist Episcopal Church ==
On a parallel path, Richard Allen (1760–1831) founded the African Methodist Episcopal Church (AME), the first independent Black church within the Methodist tradition. He and his followers converted a building and opened it on July 29, 1794, as Mother Bethel A.M.E. Church. In 1799, Allen was ordained as the first Black minister in the Methodist Church by Bishop Francis Asbury. In 1816, Allen gathered other Black congregations in the region to create a new and fully independent denomination, the African Methodist Episcopal Church. In 1816, Allen was elected as the AME's first bishop.

== Yellow Fever Epidemic of 1793 ==
Yellow fever repeatedly struck Philadelphia and other coastal cities in the 1790s, until sanitary improvements advocated by Dr. Benjamin Rush were adopted and completed. In the meantime, Allen and Jones assisted Rush in helping people afflicted by the plague, for people of African descent were initially rumored to be immune. Many Caucasians (including most doctors except for Rush and his assistants, some of whom died) fled the city, hoping to escape infection. Allen and Jones' corps of African-American Philadelphians helped nurse the sick, as well as bury the dead. Jones, in particular, sometimes worked through the night. However, Rush's reliance on bleeding and purging as a medical treatment proved misplaced.

When Mathew Carey published a popular pamphlet accusing African Americans of profiting from nursing sick Caucasian citizens but also Jones and Allen published a protest pamphlet in response. They described sacrifices that they and the Free African Society members made for the city's health. Philadelphia Mayor Matthew Clarkson, who had called upon them for help, publicly recognized that Jones and Allen acted upon their desires to improve the entire community. Jones' responses to the overall crisis strengthened ties between "free" African Americans and many progressive European Americans, aiding him later on when he established St. Thomas' Episcopal Church. Almost twenty times more black people helped the plague-struck than whites, which proved crucial in helping St. Thomas Church gain social acceptance.

== Death and legacy ==
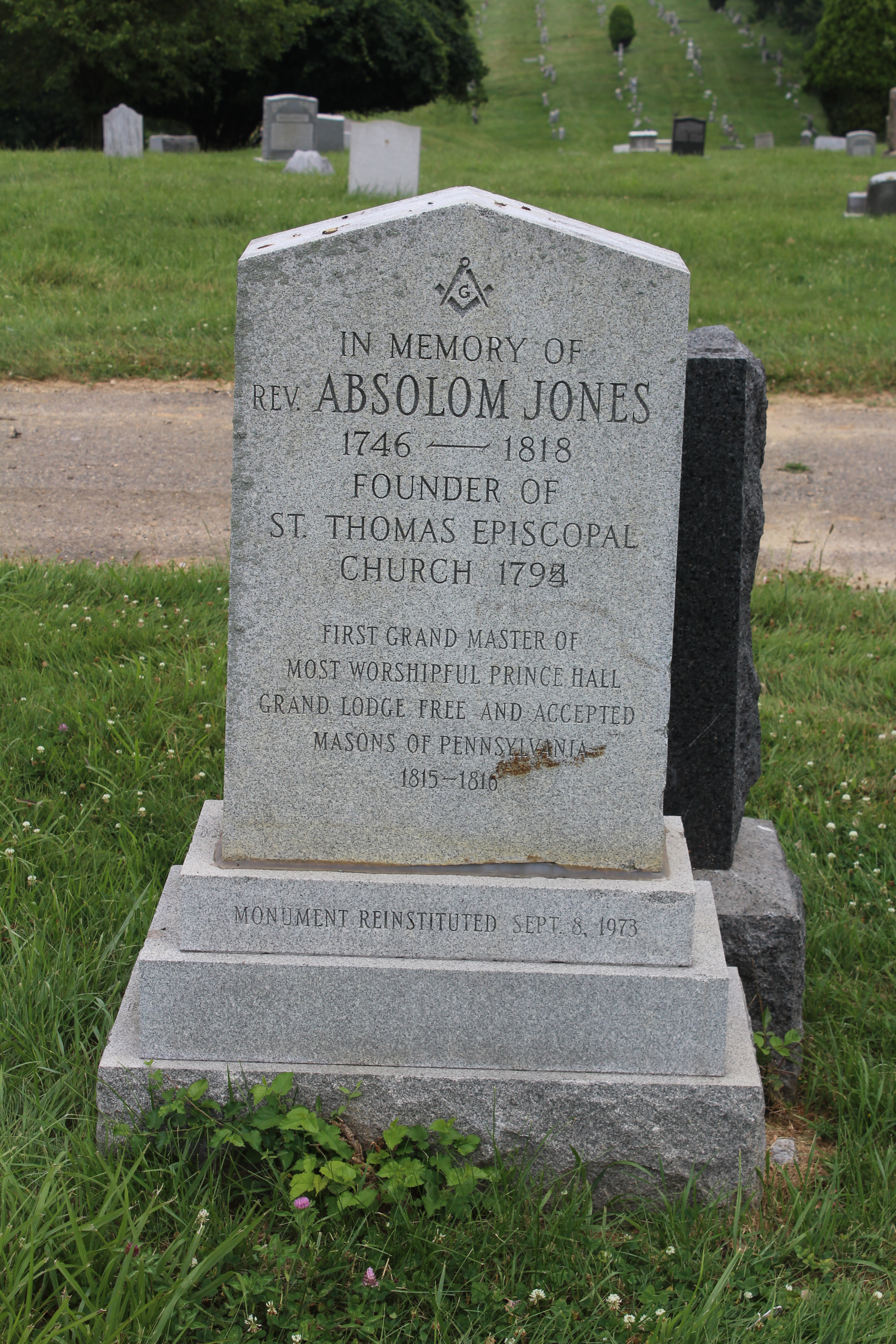
Absalom Jones Cenotaph in Eden Cemetery

Jones died on February 13, 1818, in Philadelphia. He was initially interred in the St. Thomas Churchyard in Philadelphia, Pennsylvania. His body was relocated to Lebanon Cemetery and then to Eden Cemetery. In 1991, his remains were exhumed, cremated and placed in a reliquary in the Absalom Jones altar of the current African Episcopal Church of St. Thomas (now located at 6361 Lancaster Avenue in Philadelphia). The chapel is named in his honor, as is the church's rectory.

On September 30, 1984, a State Historical Marker commemorating Jones and the founding of St. Thomas' African Episcopal Church was dedicated by the Pennsylvania Historical and Museum Commission.

The national Episcopal Church remembers his life and service annually with a Lesser Feast on the anniversary of his death, February 13.

The Episcopal Diocese of Pennsylvania honors his memory with an annual celebration and award.

== See also ==
- List of slaves
