= African Methodist Episcopal women preachers =

While Female preachers within the African Methodist Episcopal (AME) Church have existed since its founding, their formal ordination within the Church has been relatively recent. Throughout the Church's history, both men and women have worked to achieve the ordination of women.

== Early history ==
In the early days of the African Methodist Episcopal Church, women's roles paralleled their lives at home, primarily limited to domestic duties From the first General Conference in 1816, an informal Daughters of the Conference group mended the clergymen's clothing so they would not appear unkempt. The group was formalized in 1828.

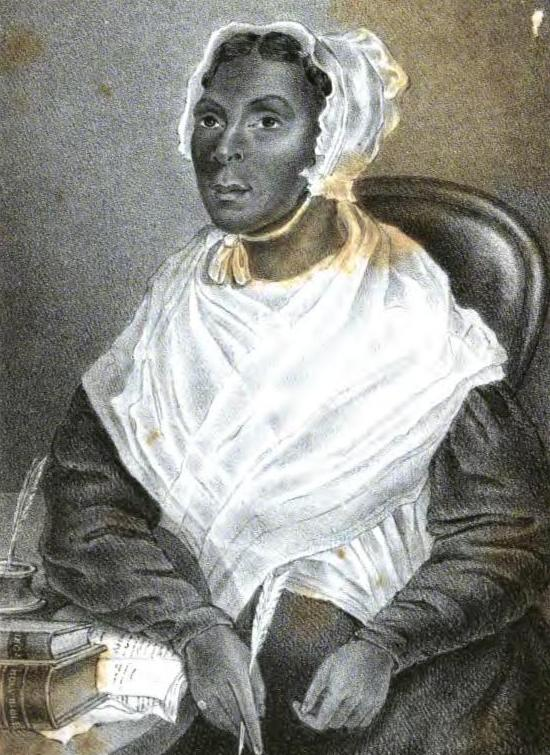
Jarena Lee

The first African Methodist Episcopal woman to preach, Jarena Lee, faced resistance to her calling. She was denied ordination by the founder of the AME Church, Richard Allen (bishop), who told her that the Church "did not call for women preachers." A few years after her husband died, Lee reapplied to Allen, requesting to be able to exhort and hold prayer meetings. This time, he granted her permission. Because she was unable to preach from a pulpit, she did so from her home. However, one day, when faced with a lackluster minister, she felt called to Preach and rose to do so; following this, Allen granted her permission to preach. However, her status as a preacher was never official.

In the ensuing decades, other women followed Lee in preaching. For example, Zilpha Elaw was cited as a traveling preacher in Maryland and Harriet Felson Taylor in Washington, D.C. Rachel Evans, in New Jersey, was recorded as a "preacheress of no ordinary ability." Rebecca Cox Jackson also served as a preacher, before entering a Shaker community. However, there were many doubts about allowing women to hold any official position in the Church.

In 1844, Nathan Ward and forty others petitioned the General Conference to license women to preach. Four years later, the Daughters of Zion also petitioned to do so. Both of these proposals were rejected. Other proposals were rejected in 1852 and 1864.

There was a, perhaps incorrect, belief that women had created an underground network that organized local preaching assignments. Though this story may have been fictional, it was discussed at the 1850 Philadelphia Conference. Leading bishop Daniel Payne addressed the threat of the organization, describing the woman as a "rope of sand" with no hope to last into the future.

== After the Civil War ==
Following the Northern victory in the American Civil War, the AME Church gained members amongst the newly emancipated southern Blacks. Most of these new church members were women. Women continued to serve less formally as preachers. Amanda Smith preached in the United States and Britain in the holiness movement following the Civil War. She evangelized at camp meetings in the northeast and was sanctioned as an AME Church preacher after leading a revival in Brownstown, Pennsylvania, where she converted seventy-two people. Other female preachers included Sarah A. Hughes, Margaret Wilson, Emily Calkins Stevens, and Lena Doolin Mason.

In 1868, the Church's General Conference created the position of stewardesses. While stewardess was a lay position, it was the first one open to women within the Church's hierarchy. Yet, the powers of stewardesses were limited. They were treated as assistants and did not hold equal authority as their male counterparts.

In 1872, the non-preacher roles of women expanded through the Women's Missionary Society. However, it did not have real authority and was largely made up of Northern women. A version in the South was founded in 1888, the Southern Women's Foreign and Home Missionary Society.

At the 1884 General Conference, delegates sanctioned the licensing of women as lay preachers, though formal ordination was still prohibited. At the same conference, a resolution was introduced to limit the roles of female preachers within the Church. It aimed to end the practice of appointing women as pastors. The next year, Bishop Henry McNeal Turner ordained Sarah A. Hughes as a Deacon in the North Carolina Conference as the first woman ordained within the AME Church. In 1887, at the North Carolina Annual Conference, Bishop Jabez Campbell, who presided over that year's conference, ruled that her ordination was against the church's law and removed her name from the list of deacons. At the General Conference in 1888, the church issued a resolution saying that "bishops of the African Methodist Episcopal Church be and are hereby forbidden to ordain a woman to the order of a deacon or an elder in our church." However, women continued to preach under licenses that had been permitted under the 1884 General Convention.

In 1888, the Church created the role of "deaconesses," a "quasi-ministerial" position with duties including ministering to the poor and sick. Each annual conference included a Board of Deaconesses made up of nine members, including at least three women, that certified deaconesses. While some deaconesses, like Mary Louise Brown, acted in a more formal ministerial capacity and considered themselves the equivalent of ordained ministers, most AME members considered deaconesses similarly to stewardesses. Women who pursued the ministry referenced a divine call to preach, and many attended a seminary in preparation for their careers. Some women were licensed as preachers, though they were not ordained.

== The 20th and 21st centuries ==
In 1898, Sara J. Duncan, the leader of the Women Foreign and Home Missionary Society, called on the General Conference to include more women. The General Conference of 1900 created the position of unordained deacons, opening a formal preaching role to women. This was the last expansion in the official roles open to women in the AME Church until 1948 when the Church reversed the decision of 1888 to ordain women as Local Deacons. It appears that Rebecca M. Glover, assistant pastor of the Metropolitan African Methodist Episcopal Church was the first woman to be ordained following the new resolution. In 1956, it began ordaining women as Local Elders, and in 1960 they were ordained to Itinerant orders.

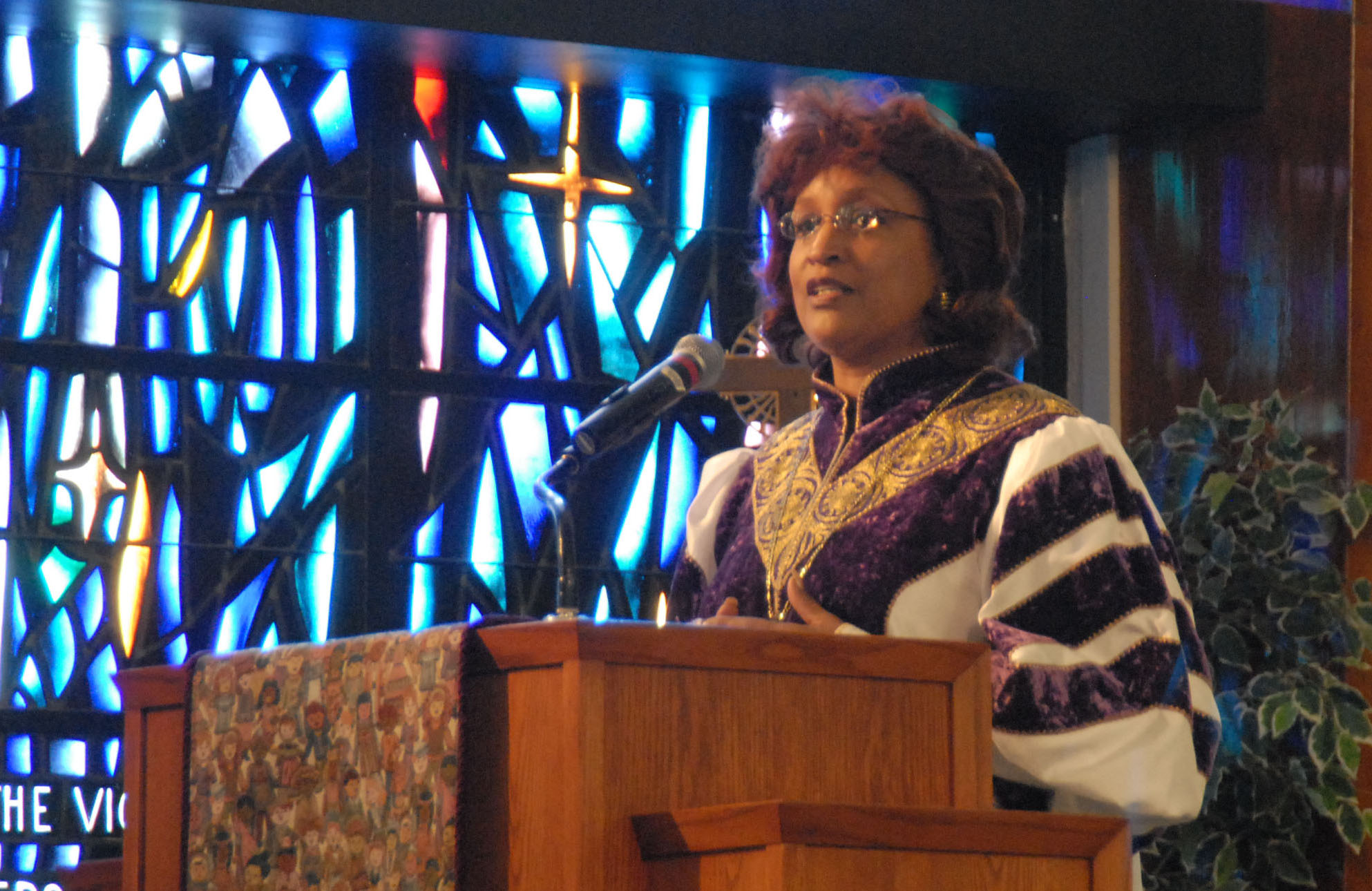
Vashti Murphy McKenzie

In 1964, Carrie T. Hooper ran for bishop at the General Conference. However, she received only 13 votes.

In 2000, the AME Church elected its first female bishop, Vashti Murphy McKenzie. In 2004, two more female bishops were elected, Carolyn Jackson Tyler-Guidry and Sarah Frances Davis. However, despite women rising to high positions within the Church, there have continued to be concerns over female preachers within the Church.
