= Alice Dugged Cary =

American educator and librarian

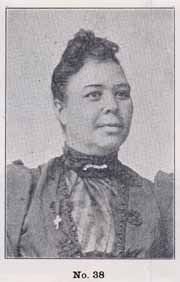
Alice Dugged Cary (1859–1941), as pictured in Sara J. Duncan’s Progressive Missions in the South and Addresses with Illustrations and Sketches of Missionary Workers and Ministers and Bishops' Wives, 1906

Alice Dugged Cary (also known as Alice Dugged Carey; September 1859 – September 25, 1941), was an American educator and librarian.

== Biography ==
Alice Dugged was born in New London, Indiana, in 1859. Her parents were John Richard Dugged and Josie A. (Gilliam) Dugged and she had two siblings.

She was educated in public schools in Marshall, Michigan, and graduated Wilberforce University in 1881. She began her teaching career in the public schools of Kansas in 1882. She became assistant principal at Lincoln High School, Kansas City, Missouri, in 1884, and the following year she married the Rev. Jefferson Alexander Carey Jr, a minister of the A.M.E. Church. They moved to Atlanta, Georgia, where she accepted an appointment in 1886 as the second principal of Morris Brown College. In 1887 she was the first principal of the Mitchell Street School, a position she held concurrently with her university role.

In 1921 she was appointed the first librarian of the Auburn Carnegie Library in Atlanta, the first library in the city accessible to African Americans under segregation. She also established the second branch of the Zeta Phi Beta sorority in that year. Cary was politically active, serving as the Georgia State Chairman of the Colored Woman's Committee, and as president of the Georgia State Federation of Coloured Women.

She died in Atlanta, Georgia, in 1941 and was buried at South-View Cemetery.

== Sources ==
- Bayne, John S. (2016). Atlanta's South-View Cemetery. Atlanta: Vanity Press. ISBN 978-1312735293. OCLC 962488589.
- Brown, Nikki L. M. (2006). Private Politics and Public Voices: Black Women's Activism from World War I to the New Deal. Bloomington: Indiana University Press. ISBN 9780253112392. OCLC 268793601.
- Dickerson, Dennis C. (2010). African American Preachers and Politics: The Careys of Chicago. Jackson: University Press of Mississippi. ISBN 9781604734287. OCLC 659591239.
- Khalayi, Tilu (2012). Finer Women: The Birth of Zeta Phi Deta Sorority, 1920-1935. Coral Springs, FL: Harambee Institute Press. ISBN 9780981802824. OCLC 875485507.
- Mason, Herman "Skip" (1997). Black Atlanta in the Roaring Twenties. Dover, N.H: Arcadia Publishing. ISBN 9780738567105. OCLC 38439821.
- Mason, Herman "Skip" (2000). Politics, Civil Rights, and Law in Black Atlanta, 1870-1970. Dover, N.H: Arcadia Publishing. ISBN 9780752409856. OCLC 47849033.
- Sewell, George A.; Troup, Cornelius V. (1981). Morris Brown College, the First Hundred Years, 1881-1981. Atlanta, Ga.: The College. OCLC 7976824.
- Smith, Jessie Carnie, ed. (1992). "Alice Dugged Cary "Mother Cary"". Notable Black American Women. Gale. pp. 167–168. ISBN 9780810347496. OCLC 24468213 – via Gale In Context: Biography.
