= Juliann Jane Tillman =

Preacher in the A.M.E. Church

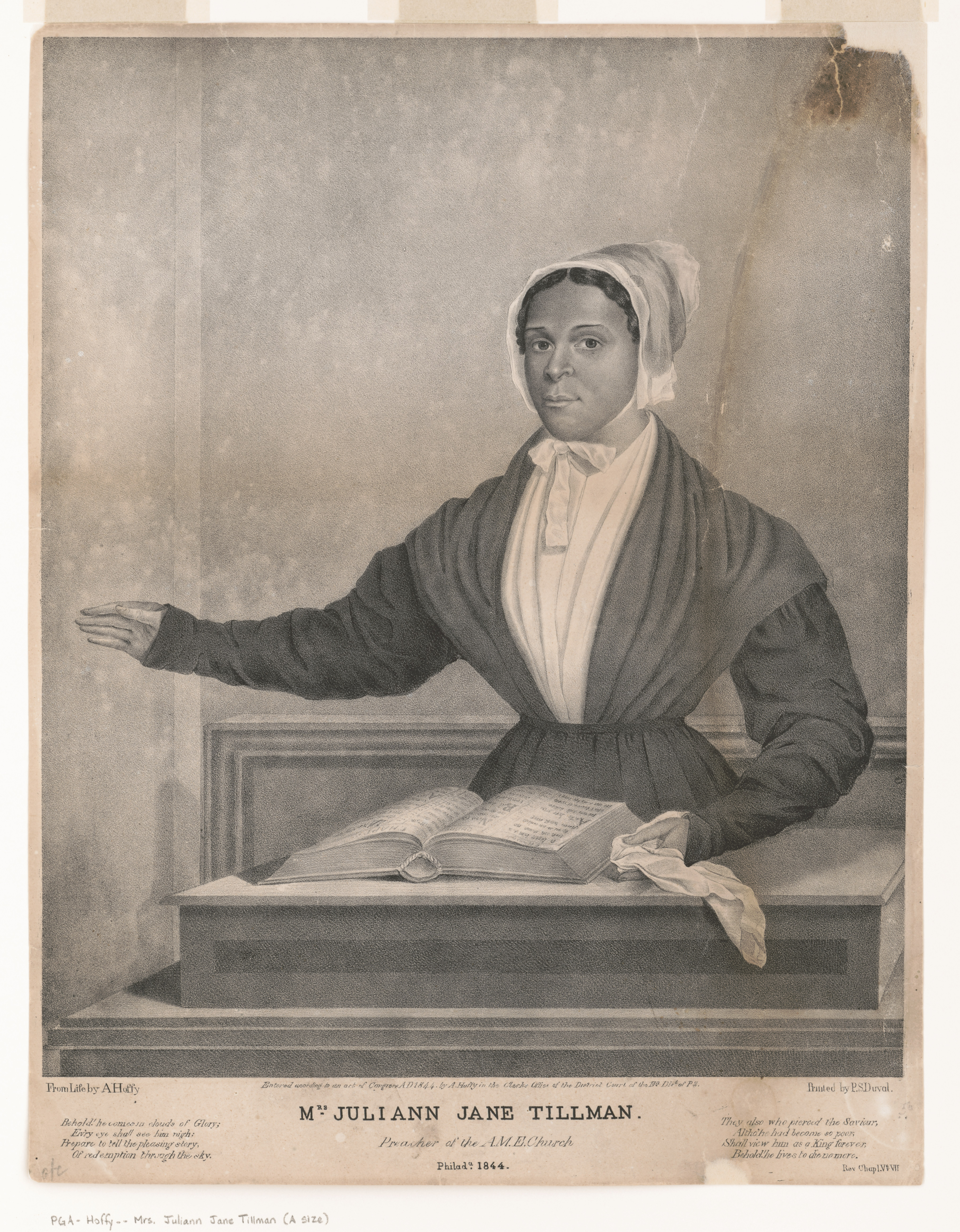
Lithograph of Juliann Jane Tillman (1844)

Juliann Jane Tillman was an American preacher in the African Methodist Episcopal Church. She is known for her lithograph portrait printed in 1844 in Philadelphia, which is held in the Library of Congress, and is often referenced by historians discussing 19th-century women preachers.

== Portrait ==
The portrait is labeled "Mrs. Juliann Jane Tillman, Preacher of the A.M.E. Church", and was engraved by Alfred Hoffy and printed by Peter S. Duval in Philadelphia. In the portrait, Tillman looks directly at the viewer and gestures, exhorting the viewer "to prepare for the second coming of Christ as prophesized [sic] in the Book of Revelation." The print itself was reproduced many times to help the AME Church reach a wider congregation, and is indicative of Tillman's popularity.

== Personal life ==
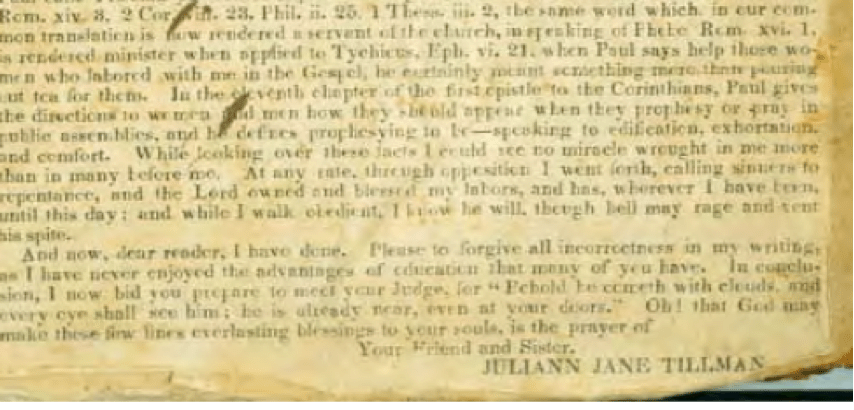
Article by Juliann Jane Tillman, found in a family Bible in Dayton, Ohio

Very little is known about Tillman herself. Tillman was quoted in an 1837 religious newspaper that she had overcome her own doubts – as well as the opposition of clergymen and laymen – after repeated visits by an angel holding a scroll that said, “Thee I have chosen to preach my gospel without delay.” She was never formally ordained.

== Historical context ==
In the decades after Jarena Lee became the first female preacher in the AME Church, other female evangelists such as Juliann Jane Tillman rose to positions of influence. Although they were initially regarded within the church with ambivalence, Lee, Tillman, Julia Foote, Rachel Evans, and others won over AME ministers such as Bishop Richard Allen and Bishop William Paul Quinn through their oratorical skills. Some clergymen welcomed women into their churches as itinerant preachers and even raised money to pay for their travel expenses. The women preachers played a major role in growing church membership prior to the Civil War.

While the AME Church allowed women to evangelize and teach, they were not allowed to become church leaders for over a century. Historian Aston Gonzalez has suggested that Tillman's portrait shows how she “created and preserved [her] religious leadership in the 1840s when male AME figures vociferously denounced their claims to preach.” Nevertheless, historian Curtis D. Johnson argues that in the North, a shared desire between African American men and women “to strengthen the black community and to destroy slavery” meant that there was less opposition to black evangelical women such as Lee, Foote, and Tillman entering the public sphere compared to their white counterparts.

== Legacy ==
As one of the few women of her time to employed as a preacher, Juliann Jane Tillman helped to pave the way for subsequent generations of African American women to build collaborative relationships between Christian churches and community organizations.

Tillman's portrait has been featured in several Library of Congress exhibits, including "The African American Odyssey: A Quest for Full Citizenship" and "Religion and the Founding of the American Republic". Her portrait was also featured in a touring Smithsonian exhibition called "Climbing Jacob's Ladder: The Rise of Black Churches in Eastern American Cities, 1740–1877". In 2007, her portrait was featured in the annual Library of Congress "Women Who Dare" calendar.

== See also ==
- Jarena Lee
- Julia Foote
- Zilpha Elaw
- Sarah E. Gorham
