= Sarah A. Hughes =

African Methodist Episcopal preacher (1847–1916)

- Born: 1847; Wake County, North Carolina
- Died: 1916 (aged 68–69); Raleigh, North Carolina
- Known for: preacher

Sarah Ann "Sallie" Copeland Hughes (1847–1916) was an African Methodist Episcopal preacher from Wake County, North Carolina.

The first reported woman of color to be ordained at the time, her ordination caused contention throughout the Church.

== Biography ==
Hughes was born in 1847 in Wake County, North Carolina. Hughes became a well-known evangelist in North Carolina. By the time she appears in AME records, she was married, though information is not known about her husband. In November 1861, the fourteen-year-old Hughes preached a service at the Church's Annual Conference Session.

In 1882, the North Carolina Annual Conference appointed Hughes to a church in Fayetteville, North Carolina. Hughes suffered pay discrimination, faced churches that unenthusiastic regarding a female pastor, and experienced discrimination from her colleagues. She left Fayetteville after a short time, of her request. The congregation had been restless while she was there and calmed upon a male preacher joining the community. Hughes then served in Wilson's Mills, North Carolina, where she oversaw the erection of the new church building's frame.

Although Hughes's colleagues excluded her from committee meetings at the 1883 North Carolina Conference, she was called before the altar to be accepted into full membership in the connection. Members, with few exceptions, were entitled to an annual pastoral appointment. Hughes was appointed to the Charlotte mission, where she was popular.

In 1884, Hughes attended the General Conference in Baltimore. She and five other women expected the Church to license them. However, a resolution was passed prohibiting female pastors, so she had to resign from her pastorate. Following this, her saddened congregation disbanded. Hughes was also pressured into returning the salary she had been provided for her work.

In 1885, Hughes was warmly received at the North Carolina Annual State Conference. She was asked to preach at a primary service and offer the closing prayer but was not given a pastoral assignment for 1886. On November 30, 1885, Bishop Henry McNeal Turner ordained Hughes and nine men as deacons. He boasted that he "had done something that had not been done in 1,500 years– that was the ordination of a woman to the office of a deaconess in the church." At the time, she was reported to be the "first colored woman preacher in the world." Hughes was not given a pastorate, following the letter of the 1884 General Conference's resolution, but she was generally well received at the Conference. However, the reporting following the conference created unrest surrounding the ordination of a woman.

In 1887, at the North Carolina Annual Conference, Bishop Jabez Campbell ruled that Hughes's ordination had been against church law. He removed Hughes's name from a list of deacons. In 1888, the Church resolved that bishops were forbidden to ordain women as deacons or elders. In 1888, this decision was unsuccessfully appealed at the General Conference.

After 1888, Hughes's name does not appear in any AME records.

Hughes was the last woman ordained in the AME Church until 1948 when the General Conference authorized the ordination of women as deacons.

== See also ==
- African Methodist Episcopal women preachers
