= Jarena Lee =

American preacher (1783–1864)

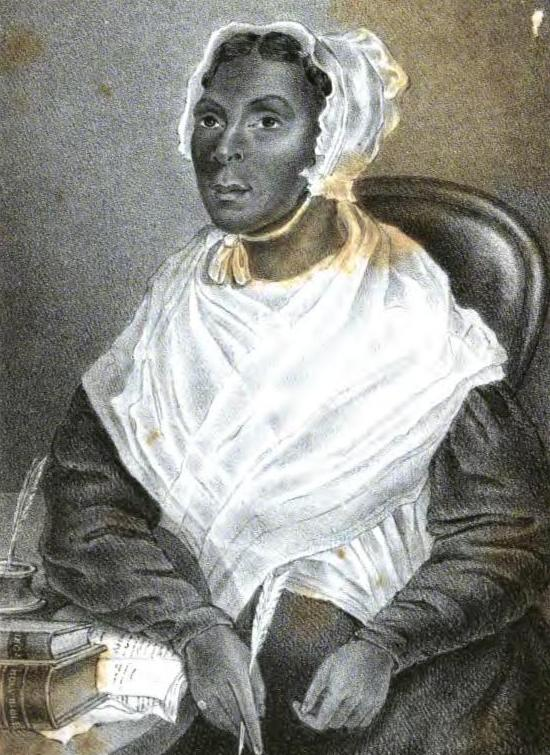

Personal life
- Born: 11 February 1783 Cape May, New Jersey
- Died: February 3, 1864 (aged 80)
- Spouse: Joseph Lee
- Known for: Preaching

Religious life
- Religion: Christian
- Denomination: African Methodist Episcopal
- Founder of: Wesleyan Holiness Movement

Jarena Lee (February 11, 1783 – February 5, 1864) was the first woman preacher in the African Methodist Episcopal Church (AME). Born into a free Black family in New Jersey, Lee asked the founder of the AME church, Richard Allen, to be a preacher. Although Allen initially refused, after hearing her preach in 1819, Allen approved her preaching ministry. A leader in the Wesleyan-Holiness movement, Lee preached the doctrine of entire sanctification as an itinerant pastor throughout the pulpits of the African Methodist Episcopal denomination. In 1836, Lee became the first African American woman to publish an autobiography.

== Early life ==
Jarena Lee was born on February 11, 1783, in Cape May, New Jersey, according to the details she published later in life in an autobiography. She recounts that she was born into a free black family, and that from the age of 7, she began to work as a live-in servant with a white family. Not much detail is known of her family or her early life. Lee later recalled that she did not receive religious instruction as a child. She was not formally educated, but taught herself to write.

In 1804, Lee was first introduced to Christianity by a Presbyterian missionary. In 1804, she moved from New Jersey to Philadelphia, Pennsylvania, where she continued in domestic service. While there, she was introduced to Christian teachings during religious revivals at Allen's church, and felt herself to be a "wretched sinner." Bishop Richard Allen's teachings inspired her to convert, but she continued to struggle in the male dominated church. She recounted that she struggled with suicidal thoughts and fantasized about drowning herself on at least several occasions. Through prayer, she finally felt justified and was baptized. After three months of constant prayer, she felt that she had been fully sanctified by the Holy Spirit.

In 1807, Lee began hearing voices telling her to "Go preach the Gospel! Preach the Gospel; I will put words in your mouth." Lee then told Richard Allen that God had spoken to her and commanded her to preach, but Allen said that there was no provision for women preachers in the Methodist Church.

== Marriage ==
Jarena married Joseph Lee in 1811, seven years after joining Philadelphia's Mother Bethel. Joseph Lee was a pastor of the African American Society at Snow Hill, six miles from Philadelphia. Lee moved to Snow Hill with her husband, but knew no one there besides her husband. She found at Snow Hill that she did not find the same closeness that she had in Philadelphia. During their marriage her husband did not want her to preach, so she felt forced to put her spiritual needs on hold for her marriage. It is said that her not being fully committed to her spiritual needs resulted in Lee becoming ill and a sense of discontent. Joseph Lee died six years into their marriage, after having two children with his wife. Soon after Lee was fully devoted to religious concerns, but her ill health never recovered.

== Call to preach ==
After her husband's death, Lee renewed her advocacy in the ministry. "If the man may preach, because the Savior died for him, why not the woman, seeing he died for her also? Is he not a whole Savior, instead of half of one?" In 1817, she again requested her ecclesial license to preach, but Allen refused again. Two years later, during a Sunday service at the Mother Bethel the preacher seemed to lose spirit. Lee stepped up and began to preach, the crowd was very intrigued to what she had to say. Following this, Bishop Allen was so impressed with Lee that he publicly endorsed her. Though he could not issue her a license to preach, he endorsed her as an official traveling exhorter. Lee went on to preach throughout the United States, including in the South, where she risked enslavement.

Religious belief became a source of self-empowerment for Lee. In rebuttal to questions on a female ministry, she responded, "Did not Mary first preach the risen Savior?". The idea that African Americans and women could preach was an element of the Second Great Awakening, which reached its peak as Lee began her missionary work.

Despite Richard Allen's blessing, Lee continued to face hostility to her ministry because she was black and a woman. She became a traveling minister, traveling thousands of miles on foot. In one year alone, she "travelled two thousand three hundred and twenty-five miles, and preached one hundred and seventy-eight sermons."

== Late life and death ==
In 1836, Lee became the first Black woman to publish an autobiography, which she titled The Life and Religious Experience of Jarena Lee. She published an extended version with a hired publisher in 1849, including 70 pages revealing names of those who had rejected the Spirit’s movement within her preaching. Much of the known information about Lee's life is from these sources. It is known as the first autobiography of a black woman, and was also pioneering in the theological genre.

In 1852, the African Methodist Episcopal Church officially ruled that women were not allowed to preach. Following this decision, Lee disappeared from the historical record. However, Dr. Frederick Knight identified her amongst the speakers at the 1853 American Anti-Slavery Society’s convention, at which she joined the Pennsylvania Female Anti-Slavery Society and supported the anti-colonization resolution.

Lee's date of death is unclear. Archival research by Dr. Knight suggests that Jarena Lee died penniless in Philadelphia and was buried at Olive Cemetery. However, records of Mount Pisgah AME Church Cemetery indicate that she died in 1855 and was buried there. Other sources list her death in 1857.

== Legacy ==
Lee is recognized as the first woman to preach in the African Methodist Episcopal (AME) Church. Her life story exemplifies the 19th-century American religious movement's focus on personal holiness and sanctification. She has been compared to influential African American women of her time, such as Maria W. Stewart and Sojourner Truth. In the decades after Jarena Lee became a preacher, other women such as Juliann Jane Tillman gained prominence as evangelists within the AME Church.

Jarena Lee was the subject of a research project at Harvard Divinity School entitled "The Resurrection of Jarena Lee." Womanist Biblical scholar Nyasha Junior is involved with this project.

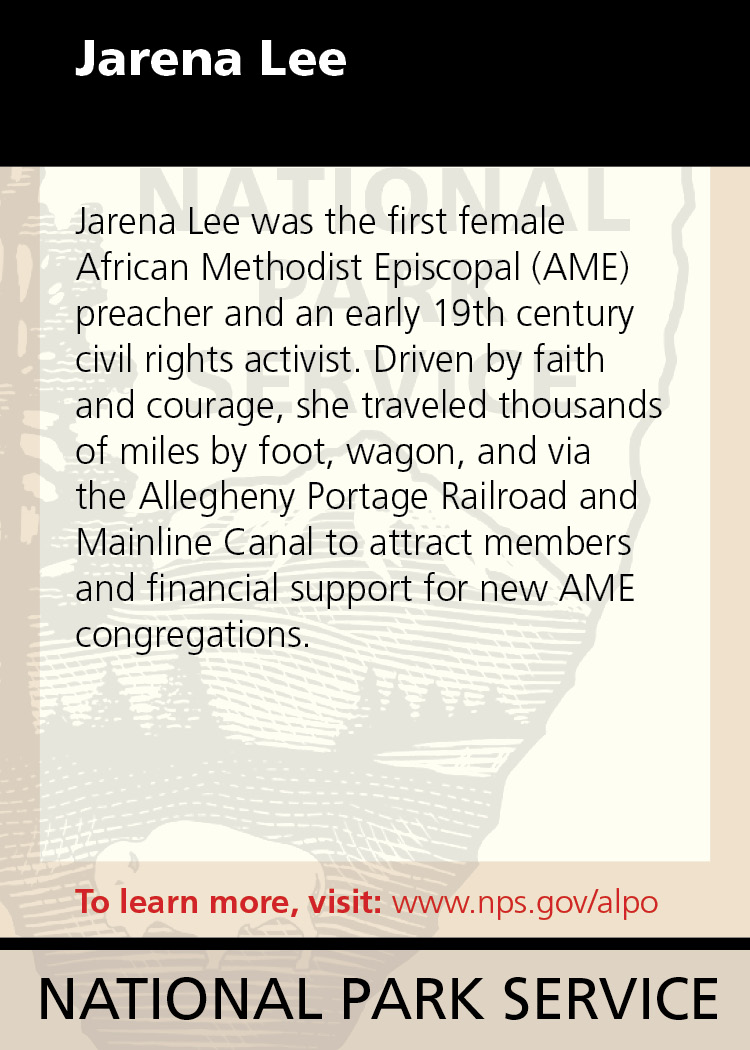
National Park Service panel on Jarena Lee.

== See also ==
- Richard Allen
- "Black Harry" Hosier
- Juliann Jane Tillman
- Mary G. Evans
- Martha Jayne Keys
- Amanda Smith
- African Methodist Episcopal women preachers

== Bibliography ==
- Peterson, Carla L. (1995). Doers of the Word: African American Women Speakers and Writers in the North (1830–1880). New York: Oxford University Press. ISBN 0813525144.
- Religious Experience and Journal of Mrs. Jarena Lee. 1849.
