= Martha Jayne Keys =

American clergy, writer (1892–1975)

Martha Jayne Keys (August 25, 1892 – December 22, 1975) was an American Christian minister. She was the first woman to be ordained in the African Methodist Episcopal Church and was president of the West Kentucky conference branch for five years. She was also the author of a 1933 gospel drama, The Comforter.

== Early life and education ==
Keys was born in Mayfield, Kentucky, United States, to Thomas J. and Lizzie A. Keys. In the 1910s, she graduated from Payne Theological Seminary. She earned her Doctor of Divinity from the same university in 1930. On April 12, 1933, she copyrighted the single act drama, The Comforter, [D 22176], under the name Evangelist Dr. Martha Jayne Keys Marshall.

== Career ==
=== Campaign for ordination of women ===
Keys campaigned and introduced a bill to the AME General Conference for the ordaination of women as itinerant elders in 1935 (and/or 1936) and again in 1940. At the 1936 AME General Conference where she was a delegate, she earned the support of her cohorts, prominent ministers, the presiding elder of Cleveland, Ohio, and the AME women's missionary societies to accomplish the goals of her bill. Though it was initially rejected, she vowed to continue reintroducing and recampaigning for the bill until it was enacted. Finally, in 1960, the AME subsequently removed all restrictions placed on women's advancement in leadership roles.

=== Church leadership roles ===
By 1947, she had been pastor of five churches. In 1951, after she was ordained, Keys became pastor of the Evangelical Rescue Mission at 2113 W. Walnut in Louisville, Kentucky.

== See also ==
- Mary G. Evans
- Vashti Murphy McKenzie
- Jarena Lee
- Amanda Smith
