= Sara Duncan =

Sara Duncan may refer to:

- Sara Jeannette Duncan (1861–1922), Canadian author and journalist
- Sara J. Duncan (1869–?), African American social activist
