= Bethel African Methodist Episcopal Church (Vicksburg, Mississippi) =

Historic church in Mississippi, United States

- U.S. National Register of Historic Places
- Mississippi Landmark
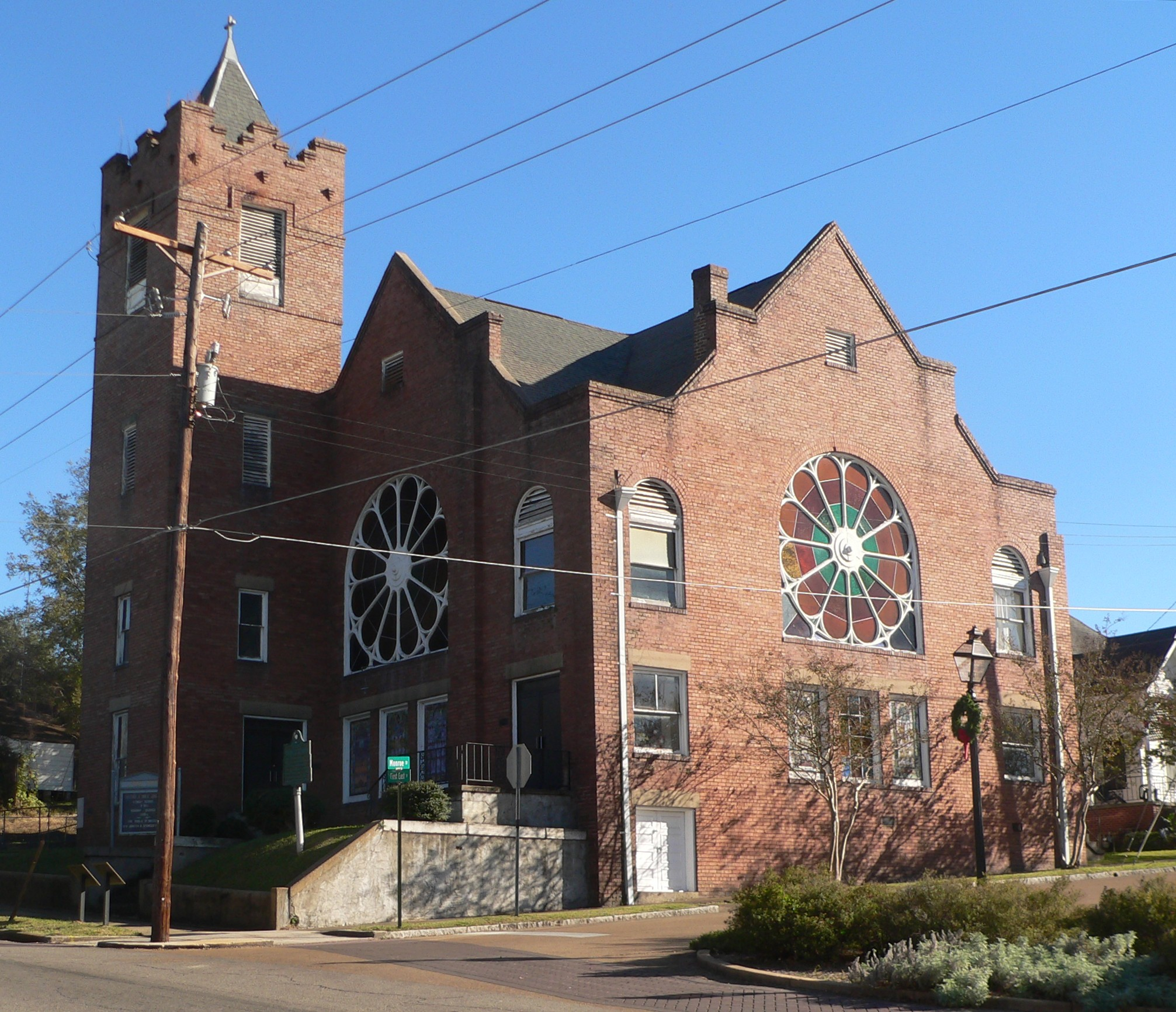

- Location within Mississippi Location within the United States
- Location: 805 Monroe St., Vicksburg, Mississippi
- Coordinates: 32.354565°N 90.878701°W
- Built: 1912
- Architectural style: Romanesque
- MPS: Vicksburg MPS
- NRHP reference No.: 92000858
- USMS No.: 149-VKS-4135.2-NR-ML

Significant dates
- Added to NRHP: July 30, 1992
- Designated USMS: November 10, 2005

Bethel African Methodist Episcopal Church is a historic African Methodist Episcopal (A.M.E.) church located at 805 Monroe Street in Vicksburg, Mississippi. The church was added to the National Register of Historic Places on July 30, 1992; and is listed as a Mississippi Landmark since November 10, 1992.

== History ==
The church's congregation was established in 1864, making it the first A.M.E. church in the state. Its first church was a preexisting church building built in 1828; this was demolished to make way for the present building, which was completed in 1912. The church has a Romanesque Revival design with an auditorium plan, a common style for church buildings built in Mississippi at the time. The building features a four-story tower on the north side topped by a crenellated pyramid roof, stained glass rose windows on three sides, and a cross gabled roof with a corbelled parapet.
