= Amanda Smith =

African-American evangelist

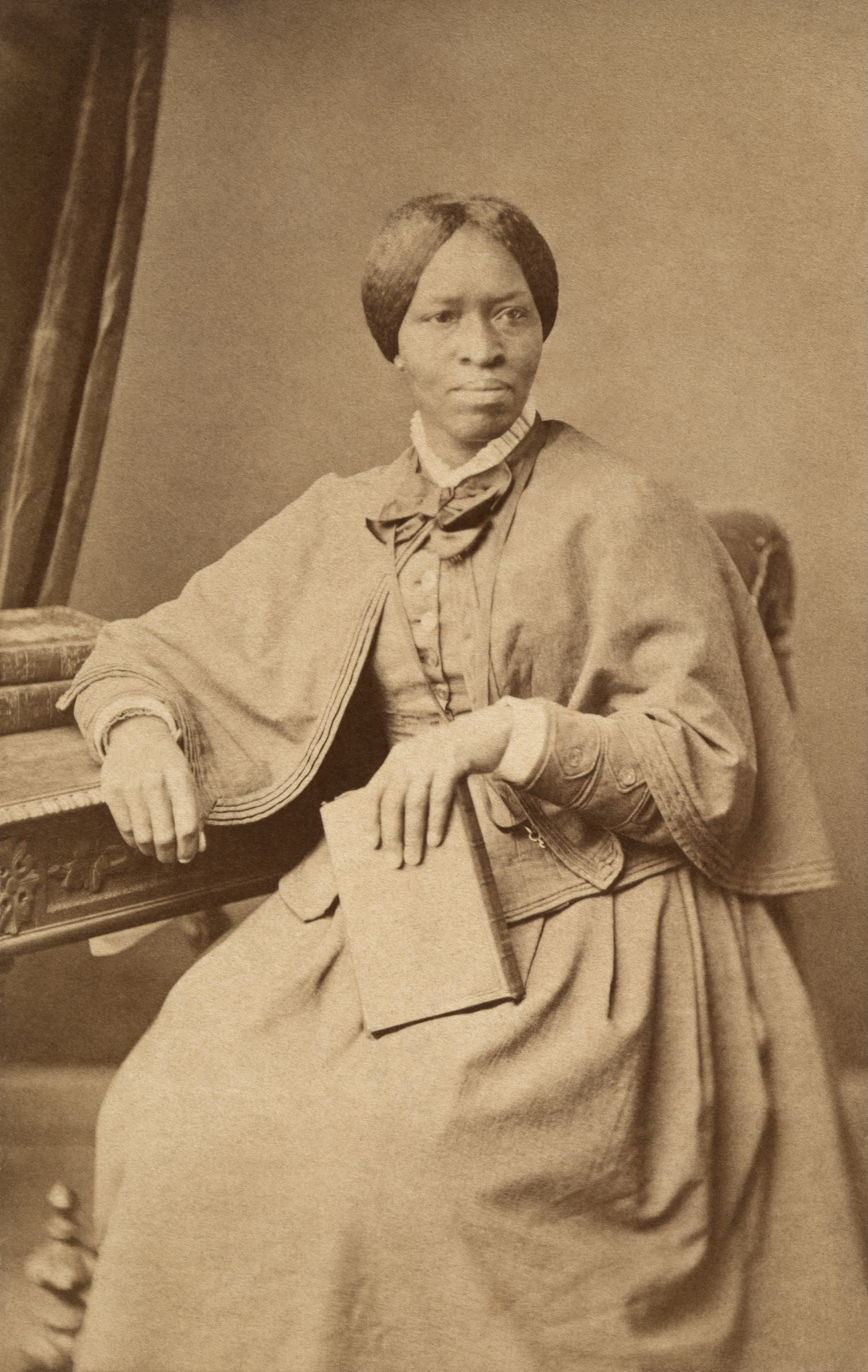
- Amanda Smith by T. B. Latchmore, circa 1885
- Born: Amanda Berry; January 23, 1837; Long Green, Maryland
- Died: February 25, 1915 (aged 78); Sebring, Florida
- Occupation: Evangelist
- Years active: 1837 - 1915
- Notable work: An Autobiography: The Story of the Lord's Dealings with Mrs. Amanda Smith the Colored Evangelist, 1893

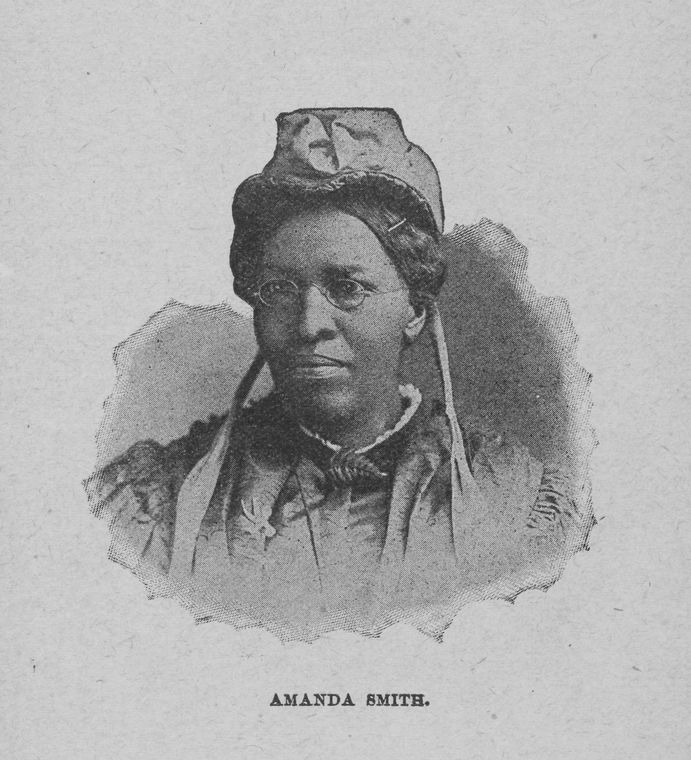

Amanda Smith (née Berry; January 23, 1837 – February 24, 1915) was an American Methodist preacher and former slave who funded the Amanda Smith Orphanage and Industrial Home for Abandoned and Destitute Colored Children in Harvey, Illinois (outside Chicago). She was a leader in the Wesleyan-Holiness movement, preaching the doctrine of entire sanctification throughout Methodist camp meetings across the world.

== Early life ==
Smith was the youngest of the thirteen children of enslaved parents Samuel Berry and Mariam Matthews in Long Green, Maryland, a small town in Baltimore County. Her father was a well-trusted man, and his master's widow trusted him enough to place him in charge of her farm. After his duties for the day were done, Mr. Berry was allowed to go out and earn extra money for himself and his family. Many nights he would go without sleeping because he was busy making brooms and husk mats for the Baltimore market. He purchased his own freedom, then that of his family; they then settled in Pennsylvania.

=== Childhood ===
Growing up, unlike many other enslaved children and adults, Smith had the advantage of learning to read and write: her father read to the family, and her mother taught her to read before she was eight, the age at which she and her younger brother were sent to school. After her sixth week of attending, the school was forced to close. Five years later they were able to attend a school five miles from their home, but were only taught if there was time after the white children's lessons; after two weeks of this they dropped out and were taught at home by their parents and sometimes taught themselves.

Having had only three and a half months of formal schooling, Amanda went to work near York, Pennsylvania, as the servant of a widow with five children. While there, she attended a revival service at the Methodist Episcopal Church.

== Adult life ==
Smith worked as a cook and a washerwoman to provide for herself and her daughter after her husband was killed in the American Civil War. By the time Smith was thirty-two, she had lost two husbands and four of her five children. Attending religious camp meetings and revivals helped her work through her grief and avoid depression. She immersed herself in the African Methodist Episcopal (AME) Church and met Phoebe Palmer, a Methodist preacher who led the Wesleyan-Holiness movement. In 1868, Smith testified that she had experienced entire sanctification.

In 1867, the National Camp Meeting Association for the Promotion of Holiness was organized and Smith began preaching the doctrine of entire sanctification at camp meetings. Opportunities to evangelize in the South and West opened up for her.

African-American women in the nineteenth century took the way they dressed very seriously and so did others. Smith always wore a plain poke bonnet and a brown or black Quaker wrapper, and carried a carpetbag suitcase.

In 1878, Smith arranged for her daughter, Mazie, to study in England, where they both stayed for two years. She next traveled to and ministered in India, where she stayed for eighteen months. Smith then spent eight years in Africa, working with churches and evangelizing. She traveled to Liberia and West Africa. Smith also expanded her family by adopting two African boys.

While in Africa she suffered from repeated attacks of "African Fever" but persisted in her work. She was a strong proponent of the temperance movement both in Africa and in the United States, and was invited by temperance advocate Rev. Dr. Theodore Ledyard Cuyler to preach at his Lafayette Avenue Presbyterian Church in Brooklyn, New York, then the largest church in its denomination, on her return to America. Methodist minister Phineas Bresee invited Smith to lead services of worship at Asbury Methodist Episcopal Church in May 1891.

Smith raised funds for the Amanda Smith Orphanage and Industrial Home for Abandoned and Destitute Colored Children in Harvey, a suburban community south of Chicago, that opened on June 28, 1899. Funds were sent by the Ladies Negro's Friend Society in Birmingham, U.K., with which she had established a relationship during her stay in England.

She faced conflict with the orphanage due to financial problems, as well as a fire that destroyed the building, conflict between Smith and the staff, complaints from neighbors, and failed inspections by the orphan home investigators. Two years after Smith's death another fire broke out in the home, killing two girls, and it was closed for good.

== Later life and death ==
Her autobiography was published in 1893, titled An Autobiography, The Story of the Lord's Dealing with Mrs. Amanda Smith, the Colored Evangelist Containing an Account of her Life Work of Faith, and Her Travels in America, England, Ireland, Scotland, India, and Africa, as An Independent Missionary.

She died in 1915 at the age of 78.

A. Louise Bonaparte continues with the family tradition of ministry through the international religious services and humanitarian efforts.

== See also ==
- African Methodist Episcopal Church
- Mary G. Evans
- Jarena Lee
- Martha Jayne Keys
