= Carolyn Tyler Guidry =

American bishop (1937–2025)

The Right Reverend Carolyn Tyler Guidry
- Church: African Methodist Episcopal Church
- Installed: 2004
- Term ended: 2012

Orders
- Ordination: 1977

Personal details
- Born: August 25, 1937 Jackson, Mississippi
- Died: May 3, 2025 (aged 87) Atlanta, Georgia
- Denomination: African Methodist Episcopal Church
- Spouse: Cary Tyler, Don Guidry
- Occupation: Bishop in the African Methodist Episcopal Church
- Education: Fuller Theological Seminary

Carolyn Tyler Guidry (sometimes spelled Tyler-Guidry), a bishop of the African Methodist Episcopal Church, was the first woman appointed to be a presiding elder in the Fifth Episcopal District of the AME Church and the second woman to become a bishop in the denomination.

== Biography ==
Tyler Guidry was born on August 25, 1937 in Jackson, Mississippi. She attended J.P. Campbell College in Jackson and received an Associate of Arts Degree in Business and Secretarial Science degree. She then began working for the National Association for the Advancement of Colored People. Tyler Guidry held the women's voter registration chair. In 1964, she was hired by the Security Pacific Bank in California where she worked for twelve years.

In 1977, she attended the Los Angeles Bible School to pursue the path of ministry, and was ordained as an itinerant Elder that year. She then served as the pastor of the First African Methodist Episcopal (A.M.E.) Church in Indio, California, where she oversaw renovations to the church and parsonage, and the creation of a day care center.

In 1983, she was appointed to the Cain Memorial A.M.E. Church in Bakersfield, California, where she served for five years. Cary B. Tyler, her first husband, died in 1988.

In 1989, Tyler Guidry became the first female to be appointed to a major metropolitan church when she was appointed to the Walker Temple A.M.E. Church, with 600 members, in Los Angeles.

In 1994, she became the first female appointed to presiding elder in the Fifth Episcopal District. In this role she oversaw 19 churches in Los Angeles. Tyler Guidry ran for election for bishop in 1996 and 2000; while her first two efforts were unsuccessful, her willingness to stand for election helped raise visibility for women clergy. In 2000, Vashti Murphy McKensie become the first woman elected bishop in the A.M.E. Church. In July 2004, Tyler Guidry became the second woman to be elected as bishop in the A.M.E. Church. That same year, she received her master's of theology from Fuller Theological Seminary.

Upon her election as bishop, she was appointed to serve as the presiding prelate of the 16th Episcopal district of the AME Church, comprising Suriname, Guyana, the Windward Islands, the Virgin Islands, the Dominican Republic, Haiti, Jamaica, Cuba and London, England. Not long after she was appointed, Hurricane Ivan caused severe damage in the region, especially in Jamaica and the Dominican Republic, which made her first months in office very hectic. In 2008, at the 48th Quadrennial Session of the General Conference of the AME Church, she was appointed to serve as bishop of the 8th Episcopal District, which comprises the US states of Louisiana and Mississippi. She retired in 2012.

In addition to her ministry in the church, she was actively involved in charitable and non-profit organizations. Tyler Guidry served as the secretary on the board of the John F. Kennedy Hospital in Indio, president of the Riverside County Board of Mental Health, and Treasurer of the national board of One Church One Child. She was also a member of Sigma Gamma Rho sorority.

Tyler Guidry was the widow of Donovan Guidry, a retired officer in the United States Army, who died in June 2007 after a lengthy illness. She was the mother of six children, grandmother of twelve and great-grandmother of thirteen.

Tyler Guidry died on May 3, 2025, in Atlanta, Georgia.
