= Jamye Coleman Williams =

American activist (1918–2022)

- Born: December 15, 1918; Louisville, Kentucky, United States
- Died: January 19, 2022 (aged 103); Atlanta, Georgia, U.S.
- Education: Wilberforce University, Fisk University (M.A.), Ohio State University (PhD)
- Occupations: professor, A.M.E. leader
- Known for: activist for social reform and justice
- Notable work: A Rhetorical Analysis of Thurgood Marshall’s Arguments Before the Supreme Court in the Public School Segregation Controversy, The Negro Speaks: The Rhetoric of Contemporary Black Leaders
- Spouse: McDonald Williams (m. 1943)
- Children: 1 daughter

Jamye Coleman Williams (December 15, 1918 – January 19, 2022) was an American activist for social reform and justice, a scholar, and a leader within academe and the African Methodist Episcopal Church (A.M.E.).

== Early life ==
Williams was born on December 15, 1918, in Louisville, Kentucky. Her father was an A.M.E. preacher and her mother a poet and musician. Williams credited her mother with inspiring her career: "I often tell people that if my mamma had the advantages they provided me, she really would have been a power" she told a reporter in 2005. "She wanted to be a missionary to Africa, but got married instead."

== University career ==
In 1938, Williams graduated with honors in English from Wilberforce University (the oldest private African American college in the U.S.). She received her M.A. in English in from Fisk University in 1939.

For the next two decades, Williams taught at Edward Waters College, Shorter College, Morris Brown College, and at her alma mater, Wilberforce, all A.M.E.-affiliated institutions. She completed her PhD in speech communication in 1959 at the Ohio State University and immediately joined the faculty of Tennessee State University. After being promoted to full professor of communications, in 1973, Williams became head of her department and served in that capacity until she retired in 1987.

Williams made contributions to rhetorical studies, a field long dominated by the study of white male orators. Her dissertation—A Rhetorical Analysis of Thurgood Marshall’s Arguments Before the Supreme Court in the Public School Segregation Controversy—was published by the Ohio State University in 1959. With her husband, she published a collection of speeches and addresses by African American orators in 1970, titled The Negro Speaks: The Rhetoric of Contemporary Black Leaders, that brought together the work of African Americans engaged in Black freedom struggles.

== Leadership ==
With her academic career on the rise, Williams took on leadership roles within the A.M.E. Church, serving as a delegate to the A.M.E. General Conference in 1964 and becoming a board member of the National Council of Churches in 1968. Williams became the first woman to hold a general office in the A.M.E. Church.

In 1984, Williams was appointed editor of The AME Church Review, an established literary journal, and served in that position until 1991. Williams was a mentor for other women in the church, supporting Vashti McKenzie’s election as the first woman to serve as an A.M.E. bishop. When asked if she was satisfied, Williams replied, "they hope we are satisfied, but we're not. . . . We need to keep working on it. I told them: 'One swallow does not a song make, and one bishop does not break the glass ceiling.'"

Williams also served as a member of the National Association for the Advancement of Colored People's Executive Committee. In 1999, she received the NAACP's Presidential Award.

== Personal life and death ==
Williams married McDonald Williams, a professor of English, in 1943. The couple had one daughter, Donna.

She lived in Atlanta, Georgia, where she died on January 19, 2022, at the age of 103.
