= 14th District of the African Methodist Episcopal Church =

The American-founded African Methodist Episcopal Church's 14th district covers Benin, Côte d'Ivoire, Ghana, Liberia, Nigeria, Sierra Leone and Togo. It has a significant presence in Nigeria. The bishop of the 14th district is since July 2016 Bishop E. Earl McCloud, Jr. from the United States.

== Nigeria ==
In Nigeria, the rise of Boko Haram has displaced churches of the AME Zion denomination and threatened their viability.

== See also ==
- Christianity in Nigeria
- Protestantism in Nigeria
- List of AME Churches
- African Methodist Episcopal Church
