= Julia A. J. Foote =

American deacon (1823–1901)

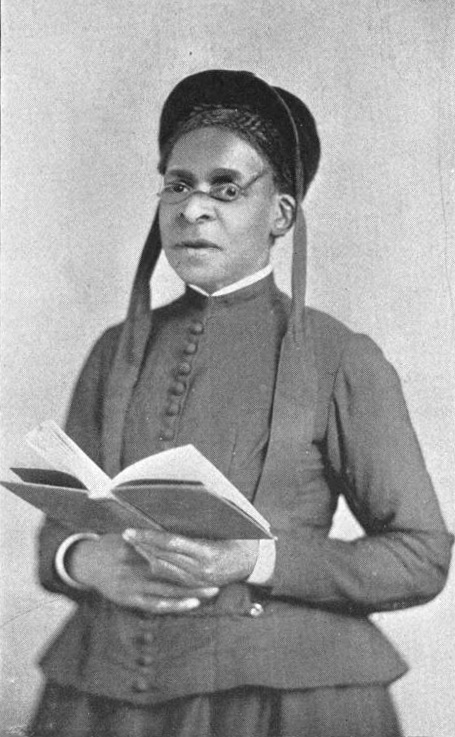
- Church: African Methodist Episcopal Zion Church

Orders
- Ordination: 1894 (deacon), 1900 (elder)
- Rank: Deacon, elder

Personal details
- Born: May 21, 1823 Schenectady, New York
- Died: November 1901 (78)
- Buried: Cypress Hills Cemetery

Julia A. J. Foote (born May 21, 1823 – November 1901) was ordained as the first woman deacon in the African Methodist Episcopal Zion Church and the second to be ordained as an elder. She was a leader in the Wesleyan-Holiness movement, preaching the doctrine of entire sanctification throughout the pulpits of the African Methodist Episcopal Zion connexion.

== Biography ==
Julia A. J. Foote was born to parents who were both former slaves. Her family moved to Albany in 1836. At age sixteen, she married George Tillman. They had one son Alonzo C Tillman. Ten years after George's death, in September 1859 she married Beverly Foot at Cleveland, Ohio and resided there.

She preached as an itinerant minister and Holiness evangelist for over fifty years. Her life is recounted in her autobiography, A Brand Plucked from the Fire: An Autobiographical Sketch.

Most of her life she faced discrimination and hardships due to her gender, race and spirituality. She found creative outlets for her spiritual calling and was eventually well received by both the Black and white communities. In 1851, Foote paused her evangelism due to losing her voice and needing to care for her ill mother. In 1869, she reported she had been healed divinely and resumed her work.

In 1878, Foote preached before an estimated 5,000 people at a holiness meeting in Lodi, Ohio. Church leaders such as Bishop Alexander Walters, Cicero R. Harris, and William Davenport wrote about her influence on the Holiness movement, on their spiritual development, and on their families as she was a dearly beloved evangelist, mentor, and friend.

In 1894, Foote was ordained as the first woman deacon in the African Methodist Episcopal Zion Church. In 1900, she was the second woman to be ordained as an elder.

Foote died in November 1901. She was living with Bishop Walters's family when she died. She was buried on Bishop Walters's family plot in the Cypress Hills Cemetery in Brooklyn on Jamaica Avenue, although there is no headstone. She was, as Bishop Walters wrote, a "renowned woman evangelist."

There is considerable evidence that Juliann Jane Tillman and Julia A J Foote are the same individual.

== Early life ==
Julia A.J. Foote, the daughter of former slaves, was born in Schenectady, New York in 1823. At the age of ten, Foote was sent to work for a farm family, and for just under two years she lived and worked for the Prime family as a domestic servant. It was under their employment that Foote received an education, despite having to eventually leave the Prime family. At twelve years old, she had to leave so that she could watch her siblings while her mother was away at work. Foote's experience with the Prime family is noted as mostly positive, however, there was a shift in attitudes when Mrs. Prime accused Foote of stealing food and whipped her as punishment. This also contributed to Foote's departure back to her family. Not long after her departure from the Prime family, Foote and her family moved to Albany, New York. This is where Foote first experienced an increased interest and passion for religion, as her family attended the African Methodist Episcopal church upon arrival.

== Family ==
Both of Foote's parents were slaves, however, her father was not born into slavery. Foote's father was born free and then was stolen during his childhood and sold into slavery. Her mother was born into slavery in the state of New York. Foote's mother endured treatment from a cruel master and then was sold from master to master until ending up with a master who treated her less cruelly. Foote's father experienced difficulty with consistent weather exposure during the time he spent enslaved. Eventually, Foote's father purchased himself, Foote's mother, and their first born child. Foote was born a free black woman, but her parents often told Foote of their times spent enslaved. The recollection of stories told by Foote's parents largely impacted Foote and added to her struggles with mental illness.

== Marriage ==
Around 1841, Foote married George (Tillman), who worked in Chelsea. They spent a significant amount of time apart, as George's job as a sailor required him to travel back and forth from Chelsea to Boston, where he and Foote moved to in 1841. Time apart from her husband gave Foote the space to explore her passion for religion, and she sought to preach at the local AME Zion church to which she belonged. George was not supportive of her desire to preach, as it was not common for women to be preachers. However, her husband's expostulations did not stop her from pursuing what she believed was God's calling for her to preach. Some time in the late 1840s, George died and Foote ended up traveling and preaching across the United States. Her marriage to George Tillman was by 1839. And some 10 years after his death she married Beverly Foot(e) at Cleveland, Cuyahoga, Ohio on September 29, 1859. A 11 year old son Alonzo C Tillman resided with Julia and Beverly Foote for the 1860 US Census of Ohio. Sadly local Newspaper reporting 13 year old Alonzo Tillman, only son of Beverly and Julia A Foot drowned in Lake Erie, 6 August 1862.

== Advocacy ==
Through her autobiography and her preachings, Foote shed light on the discrimination that African American people face in the United States, and also the prejudices against women that exist. She used her religious voice and impact to spread far-reaching messages about these major societal issues. She felt that if women read, heard, and grasped the power of the gospel they would be free from prejudices and discrimination, and she actively sought for women to be able to preach in churches. During her travels where she preached across the United States, she brought along other women, including Sister Ann M. Johnson, who she preached and traveled with for about seven years. Foote also spoke a lot about the issues that African Americans face in society, and discussed their spirituality and argued that people should strive to achieve Holiness. In her autobiography, she stresses slavery's impact on African American families, the financial hardships that African Americans face, and the evils of lynching.

== AME Zion Church ==
Foote began her spiritual journey during her childhood while she was living as an indentured servant. After leaving the Prime family, Foote and her parents moved to Albany where they joined the African Methodist Church. George, Foote's husband, spent time away from home, which gave Foote the opportunity to spend her time by reading and teaching the “poor and forsaken” ones about Jesus. Foote experienced several spiritual encounters throughout her life. This promoted her desire to be involved with the church. However, she was excommunicated from the African Methodist Church because she could not be a female minister. Her religious views created conflict between her and her mother and her husband. After George Foote's death, Julia Foote went on to be a traveling evangelical preacher for the A.M.E Zion Church. She was tied to the A.M.E Church in Ohio, the mid-Atlantic states, and southern New England.

== Autobiography ==
Foote's autobiography is titled, A Brand Plucked from the Fire: An Autobiographical Sketch. In thirty total chapters, Foote describes the events of her childhood, teenage years, and adulthood. Her autobiography places great emphasis on her commitment to religion. In Chapter VII, “My Conversion,” she describes how she was converted at the age of fifteen years old, highlighting the varying emotions she was experiencing during this crucial moment in her life. She later describes her intense urge to learn more and describes how she read the Bible every chance that she could. Foote also discusses her marriage to George and the timeline of their relationship. Two examples of where her commitment to religion is highlighted are in the chapters titled “My Call to Preach the Gospel” and “Heavenly Visitations Again”. The chapter titled “Women in the Gospel” is especially significant in that Foote emphasizes the struggles she faced as a woman in the Church.

The autobiography omits any details of her secular life in Cleveland, Ohio. As well no mention of the birth and death of her son, Alonzo C Tillman. Nor of her second marriage in 1859 at Cleveland to Beverly Foote.
