= Sara J. Duncan =

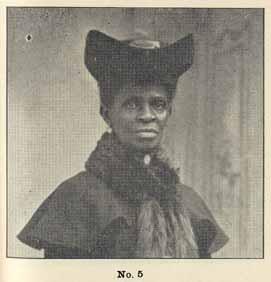
Sara J. Duncan in 1906

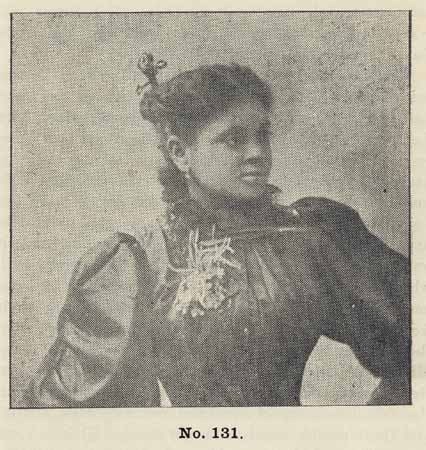
Sara J. Duncan in 1897

Sara J. Hatcher Duncan (born October 5, 1869, Cahaba, Alabama, died July 18, 1906, Selma, Alabama) was an African- American social activist who was appointed President of the African Methodist Episcopal Church's Women's Home and Foreign Missionary Society in 1900.

== Life ==
Duncan was born to a former slave, S. George Hatcher, as the youngest of four children. Her mother, Eliza English, was mixed-race and died shortly after Duncan's birth. Her family lived in relative prosperity and were of some local political importance; her grandfather Jordan Hatcher was the local postmaster, and had been a delegate at the 1868 Alabama Constitutional Convention.

Duncan was educated at the Presybeterian Knox Academy, Selma, Alabama, from 1881; she subsequently became a schoolteacher. In 1889 she married Robert H. Duncan, of Rome, Georgia. She continued her teaching career and became involved in missionary work. In 1896 she returned to Selma from Rome, and was involved in the foundation of the Women's Home and Foreign Missionary Society. Duncan served as superintendent between 1897 and 1900, and as president in 1900. She founded a newspaper, the Missionary Searchlight in 1898.

Her later life is obscure but she wrote a book about the missionary activity of the A.M.E. Church in 1906.

== See also ==
- African Methodist Episcopal women preachers
