= Mary G. Evans =

Christian minister who was pastor at Chicago's Cosmopolitan Community Church

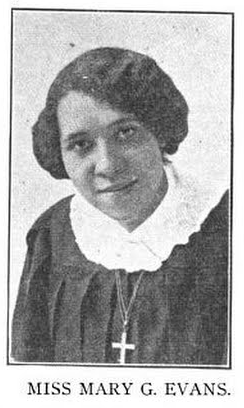
- Evans in a publication, 1916.
- Born: January 13, 1891; Washington, D. C., U.S.
- Died: April 12, 1966 (aged 75); Chicago, Illinois, U.S.
- Education: Wendell Phillips High School; D.D. Wilberforce University
- Occupation: Minister
- Years active: 1905–1966
- Known for: Minister of Chicago's Cosmopolitan Community Church.

Mary G. Evans (January 13, 1891 – April 12, 1966) was an American Christian minister. Evans is most known for serving as the pastor of Chicago's Cosmopolitan Community Church for 34 years, from 1932 until her death in 1966. She was the first woman to receive a Doctor of Divinity degree from Wilberforce University.

== Early life and education ==
Evans was born in Washington, D. C. Orphaned at an early age, she was raised by an aunt and uncle and educated in Chicago at Wendell Phillips High School. At age 14, Evans was licensed to preach in the African Methodist Episcopal Church. After high school, she attended Wilberforce University in Ohio as a young woman. In 1913, she traveled the world, visiting Europe, North Africa, and the Middle East, and attending the World's Seventh Sunday School Convention as a delegate. Evans pursued further studies in psychology and sociology at Columbia University, the University of Chicago, and Baylor University. She was the first black student to serve as National Student Secretary for the Young Women's Christian Association.

== Career ==
Evans served two churches in Indianapolis, Indiana, before becoming pastor of the interdenominational Cosmopolitan Community Church in Chicago in 1932. When she arrived at Cosmopolitan, the church was heavily in debt. Under her stewardship, the church paid its debts, refurbished its building, and in 1948 built a community center called Faith House which offered a health clinic, a gymnasium, food bank, and child care. The church later built a home for older women, opened in 1963, and Evans lived there in her last years. A colleague, the Rev. Clarence H. Hobbs, commented at her death, "She's the greatest administrator any church has ever had. I don't think any minister, any place, could have done better than Mary Evans." Evans was a strong supporter of the National Association for the Advancement of Colored People, and led successful membership drives at Cosmopolitan. She was especially moved by their anti-lynching campaign, explaining to her congregation that "If three Negroes can be lynched in one week in Mississippi, we Negroes should on our knees join the one organization that is fighting lynching." She served on the executive committee of the organization's Chicago branch and was a life member from 1955.

== Personal life and death ==
Evans never married or had children. To some people, Evans was considered "mannish" in her appearance; but she was also referred to as a "motherly presence" at Cosmopolitan Church. Evans lived with teacher Harriet Kelley in Indianapolis, Indiana, and with Edna Cook during her early years in Chicago. Evans died in 1966, aged 75 years.

== See also ==
- Martha Jayne Keys
