= Sarah E. Gorham =

African Methodist Episcopal Church missionary in Africa

Sarah E. Gorham (1832–1894) was the first woman to be sent out as a missionary from the African Methodist Episcopal Church. She has been described as a "missionary, church leader, social worker".

Gorham was born in either Maryland or Virginia, but her life is not documented until 1880, when she visited family members who had moved to Liberia, presumably via the American Colonization Society. While there, she became interested in the people of the area and the programs of the missionaries. After this visit, she returned to the United States and was involved at the Charles Street African Methodist Episcopal Church. In 1888, at the age of 56, she joined AME missionary John Frederick in Sierra Leone, travelling to the Magbelle mission in Sierra Leone (about 75 miles from Freetown), as the AME's first woman foreign missionary. At Magbele she established a school, now kown as the Sarah Gorham Mission School, which gave both religious and industrial training.

In July 1894 she was bedridden with malaria and died the next month. She was buried in the Kissy Road Cemetery in Freetown, Sierra Leone.
