= African Methodist Episcopal Church =

Predominantly African American Protestant denomination

- Classification: Protestant
- Orientation: Methodist
- Scripture: Protestant Bible
- Theology: Wesleyan-Arminian
- Polity: Connexionalism
- Associations: World Methodist Council; Wesleyan Holiness Consortium; National Council of Churches (1950); World Council of Churches (1948); Churches Uniting in Christ (formerly Consultation on Church Union of 1962); Conference of National Black Churches
- Headquarters: Nashville, Tennessee
- Founder: Richard Allen (1760–1831)
- Origin: 1787 (grew out of the Free African Society which was established in 1787) and Mother Bethel A.M.E. Church, (organized 1794); Philadelphia, Pennsylvania
- Separated from: Methodist Episcopal Church (organized 1784 in Baltimore to 1939) - (currently the United Methodist Church)
- Congregations: 7,000
- Members: 2.5–3.5 million
- Official website: ame-church.com

The African Methodist Episcopal Church, usually called the AME Church or AME, is a Methodist denomination based in the United States. It adheres to Wesleyan–Arminian theology and has a connexional polity. It cooperates with other Methodist bodies through the World Methodist Council and Wesleyan Holiness Connection.

Though historically a Black church and the first independent Protestant denomination to be founded by Black people, the African Methodist Episcopal Church welcomes and has members of all ethnicities.

The AME Church was founded by Richard Allen (1760–1831) in 1787 when he called together five African American congregations of the previously established Methodist Episcopal Church with the hope of escaping the discrimination that was commonplace in society, including some churches. It was among the first denominations in the United States to be founded for this reason (rather than for theological distinctions). Allen, a previously ordained deacon in the Methodist Episcopal Church, was elected by the gathered ministers and ordained as its first bishop in 1816 by the first General Conference of the five churches—extending from the three in the Philadelphia area in Pennsylvania to ones in Delaware and Baltimore, Maryland. The denomination then expanded west and through the South, particularly after the American Civil War (1861–1865). By 1906, the AME had a membership of about half a million, more than the combined predominantly black American denominations — the Colored Methodist Episcopal Church in America and the African Methodist Episcopal Zion Church – making it the largest major African-American denomination of the Methodist tradition.

The AME Church currently has 20 districts, each with its own bishop: 13 are based in the United States, mostly in the South, while seven are based in Africa. The global membership of the AME is around 2.5 million members, and it remains one of the largest Methodist denominations in the world.

== Name ==
African
The AME Church was created and organized by people of African descent (most descended from enslaved Africans taken to the Americas) as a response to being officially discriminated against by white congregants in the Methodist Episcopal Church. The church was not founded in Africa, nor is it exclusively for people of African descent. It is open and welcoming to people of all ethnic groups, origins, nationalities, and colors, although its congregations are predominantly made up of black Americans.
Methodist
The church's roots are in the Methodist tradition. Members of St. George's Methodist Church left the congregation when faced with racial discrimination, but continued with the Methodist doctrine and the order of worship.
Episcopal
The AME Church operates under an episcopal form of church government. The denomination leaders are bishops of the church.

== History ==
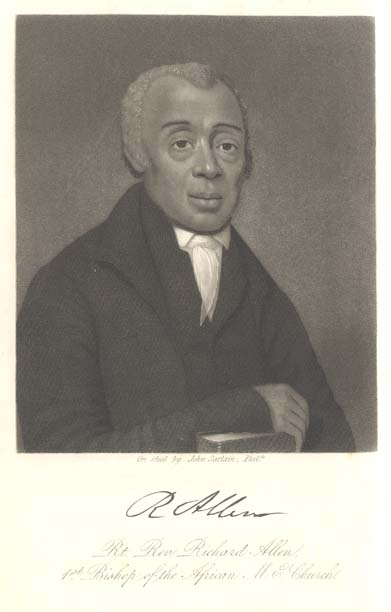
Richard Allen

=== Origins ===
The AME Church worked out of the Free African Society (FAS), which Richard Allen, Absalom Jones, and other free blacks established in Philadelphia in 1787. They left St. George's Methodist Episcopal Church because of discrimination. These members erected a site of worship to escape the "unkind treatment of their white brethren, who considered them a nuisance in the house of worship." They were told if they did not give up this space, they would be publicly expelled from the church. They resigned, an action that was supported by some white benefactors, including one who ordained Absalom Jones as their pastor.

Although Allen and Jones were both accepted as preachers, they were limited to black congregations. In addition, the blacks were made to sit in a separate gallery built in the church when their portion of the congregation increased. These former members of St. George's made plans to transform their mutual aid society into an African congregation. Although the group was originally non-denominational, eventually members wanted to affiliate with existing denominations.

Allen led a small group who resolved to remain Methodist. They formed the Bethel African Methodist Episcopal Church in 1793. In general, they adopted the doctrines and form of government of the Methodist Episcopal Church. In 1794 Bethel AME was dedicated with Allen as pastor. To establish Bethel's independence, Allen successfully sued in the Pennsylvania courts in 1807 and 1815 for the right of his congregation to exist as an institution independent of white Methodist congregations.

Because black Methodists in other middle Atlantic communities also encountered racism and desired religious autonomy, Allen called them to meet in Philadelphia in 1816 to form a new Wesleyan denomination. Sixteen representatives, from Bethel African Church in Philadelphia and African churches in Baltimore, MD, Wilmington, DE, Attleboro, PA, and Salem, NJ, met to form a church organization or connection under the title of the "African Methodist Episcopal Church".

=== Growth ===
It began with eight clergy and five churches, and by 1846 had grown to 176 clergy, 296 churches, and 17,375 members. Safe villages, like the village of Lima, Pennsylvania, were set up with nearby AME churches and were sometimes involved in the Underground Railroad. The 20,000 members in 1856 were located primarily in the North. AME national membership (including probationers and preachers) jumped from 70,000 in 1866 to 207,000 in 1876.

The church also expanded internationally during this period. The British Overseas Territory of Bermuda, 640 miles from Cape Hatteras, North Carolina, was settled in 1609 by the Virginia Company and retained close links with Virginia and the Carolinas (with Charleston settled from Bermuda in 1670 under William Sayle) for the next two centuries, with Bermudians playing both sides during the American War of Independence, being the point from which the blockade of southern Atlantic ports was maintained and the Chesapeake Campaign was launched during the American War of 1812, and being the primary port through which European-manufactured weapons and supplies were smuggled into the Confederacy during the American Civil War. Other Bermudians, such as First Sergeant Robert John Simmons of the 54th Massachusetts Volunteer Infantry Regiment, fought to end slavery in the United States. Among the numerous residents of the American South with ties to Bermuda was Denmark Vesey, who was brought to South Carolina from Bermuda as a slave before purchasing his freedom. Vesey was a founder of Mother Emanuel African Methodist Episcopal Church before his execution after conviction in a show trial resulting from white hysteria over an alleged conspiracy for a slave revolt in 1822.

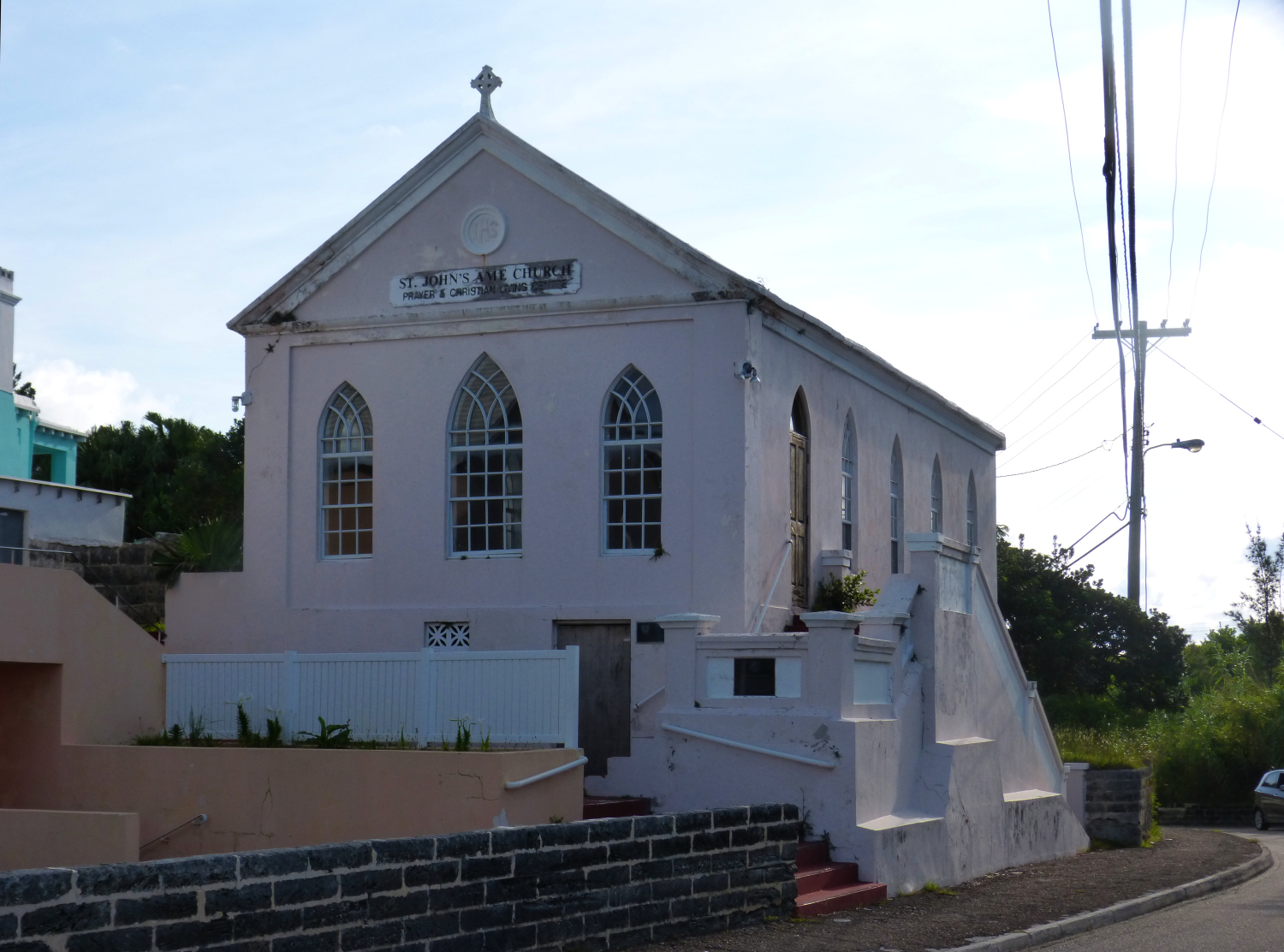
St. John African Methodist Episcopal Church Hamilton Parish, Bermuda

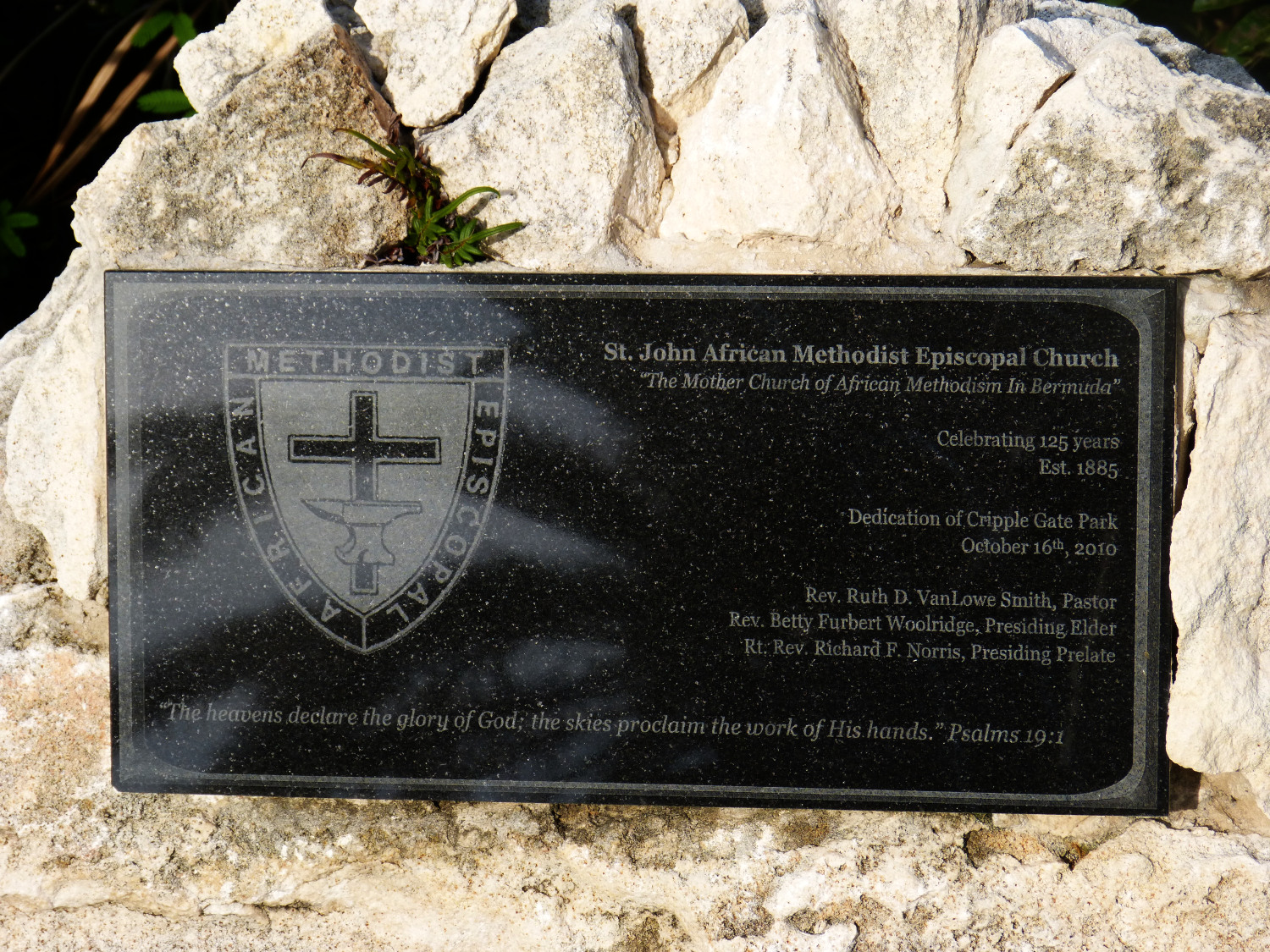
St. John AME Church 125th anniversary plaque

The majority of the population of Bermuda during the first century of settlement was European, with free and enslaved blacks primarily from the Spanish West Indies and Native Americans, primarily from New England (anyone not entirely of European ancestry was counted as coloured). As any child of a coloured and a white parent was counted as coloured, the ratio of the white to coloured population shifted during the course of the 18th century (4,850 whites and 3,514 coloured in 1721; but 4,755 whites and 5,425 coloured in 1811). The Church of England was the established church, and was the only church originally permitted to operate in Bermuda. Presbyterians were permitted to have a separate church and to conduct their own services during the 18th century. The Wesleyan Methodists sought to include enslaved blacks and a law was passed by the Parliament of Bermuda in 1800 barring any but Church of England and Presbyterian ministers from preaching. The Methodist Reverend John Stephenson was incarcerated in December, 1800, for six months for preaching to slaves. The law and attitudes changed during the course of the following century, but any church organised by blacks and organising blacks would not be welcomed by the white dominated Government. Stephenson was followed in 1808 by the Reverend Joshua Marsden. There were 136 members of the Society when Marsden left Bermuda in 1812.

Susette Harriet Lloyd travelled to Bermuda in company with the Church of England's Archdeacon of Bermuda Aubrey Spencer. Her visit lasted two years, and her "Sketches of Bermuda" (a collection of letters she had written en route to, and during her stay in, Bermuda, and dedicated to Archdeacon Spencer) was published in 1835, immediately following the 1834 abolition of slavery in Bermuda and the remainder of the British Empire (Bermuda elected to end slavery immediately, becoming the first colony to do so, though all other British colonies except for Antigua availed themselves of an allowance made by the Imperial government enabling them to phase slavery out gradually). Lloyd's book gives a rare contemporary account of Bermudian society immediately prior to the abolition of slavery. Among her many observations of the people of Bermuda, Lloyd noted of the coloured population:

The gleam of Christianity which penetrated the dreary dungeon of their African superstition, was at first so faint that it served rather to discover the gloom than to dispel the darkness which shrouded them; and having embraced the profession of the gospel, they adopted its name without receiving its influence in their heart. It is only within the last five or six years that any regular system has been adopted to give the coloured people instruction in schools connected with the church of England. This blessing is now imparted to nearly 1000 persons, in which number I do not include those who are educated in the schools under the dissenters, some of which are very flourishing.

Lloyd's negative comments on the dissenters was in reference to the Wesleyan Methodists. The degree of education of coloured Bermudians would be noted by later visitors, also. Christiana Rounds wrote in Harper's Magazine (re-published in an advertising pamphlet by A.L Mellen, the Proprietor of the Hamilton Hotel in 1876):

the colored people deserve some notice, forming, as they do, a large majority of the population. The importation of negroes from Africa ceased long before the abolition of slavery, which may account for the improved type of physiognomy one encounters here. The faces of some are fine, and many of the women are really pretty. They are polite, about as well dressed as anybody, attend all the churches, and are members thereof, are more interested in schools than the poor whites, and a very large proportion of them can both read and write.

The foundation stone of a Wesleyan Methodist Chapel was laid in St. George's Town on the 8 June 1840, the local Society (by then numbering 37 class leaders, 489 members, and 20 other communicants) having previously occupied a small, increasingly decrepit building that had been damaged beyond use in a storm in 1839. The inscription on the foundation stone included:

Mr. James Dawson is the gratuitous Architect; Mr. Robert Lavis Brown, the Overseer. The Lot of Land on which the Chapel is built was purchased, April 24th, 1839, from Miss Caroline Lewis, for Two hundred and fifty pounds currency. The names of the Trustees are, William Arthur Outerbridge, William Gibbons, Thomas Stowe Tuzo, Alfred Tucker Deane, James Richardson, Thomas Richardson, John Stephens, Samuel Rankin Higgs, Robert Lavis Brown, James Andrew Durnford, Thomas Argent Smith, John P. Outerbridge, and Benjamin Burchall.

The AME First District website records that in the autumn of 1869, three farsighted Christian men—Benjamin Burchall of St. George's, William B. Jennings of Devonshire and Charles Roach Ratteray of Somerset—set in motion the wheels that brought African Methodism to Bermuda. By the latter Nineteenth Century, the law in Bermuda specified that any denomination permitted to operate in the United Kingdom should also be permitted in the colony (although only the Church of England, the Presbyterian Church, and the Wesleyan Methodists were permitted to conduct baptisms, weddings and funerals until after the First World War). As the Imperial Government had ruled that the AME Church could operate in the United Kingdom, the first AME church in Bermuda was erected in 1885 in Hamilton Parish, on the shore of Harrington Sound, and titled St. John African Methodist Episcopal Church (the congregation had begun previously as part of the British Methodist Episcopal Church of Canada). Although the Church of England (since 1978, titled the Anglican Church of Bermuda) remains the largest denomination in Bermuda (15.8%), the AME quickly flourished (accounting for 8.6% of the population today), overtaking the Wesleyan Methodists (2.7% today).

The rise of the Wesleyan-Holiness movement in Methodism influenced the African Methodist Episcopal Church, with Jarena Lee and Amanda Smith preaching the doctrine of entire sanctification throughout pulpits of the connexion.

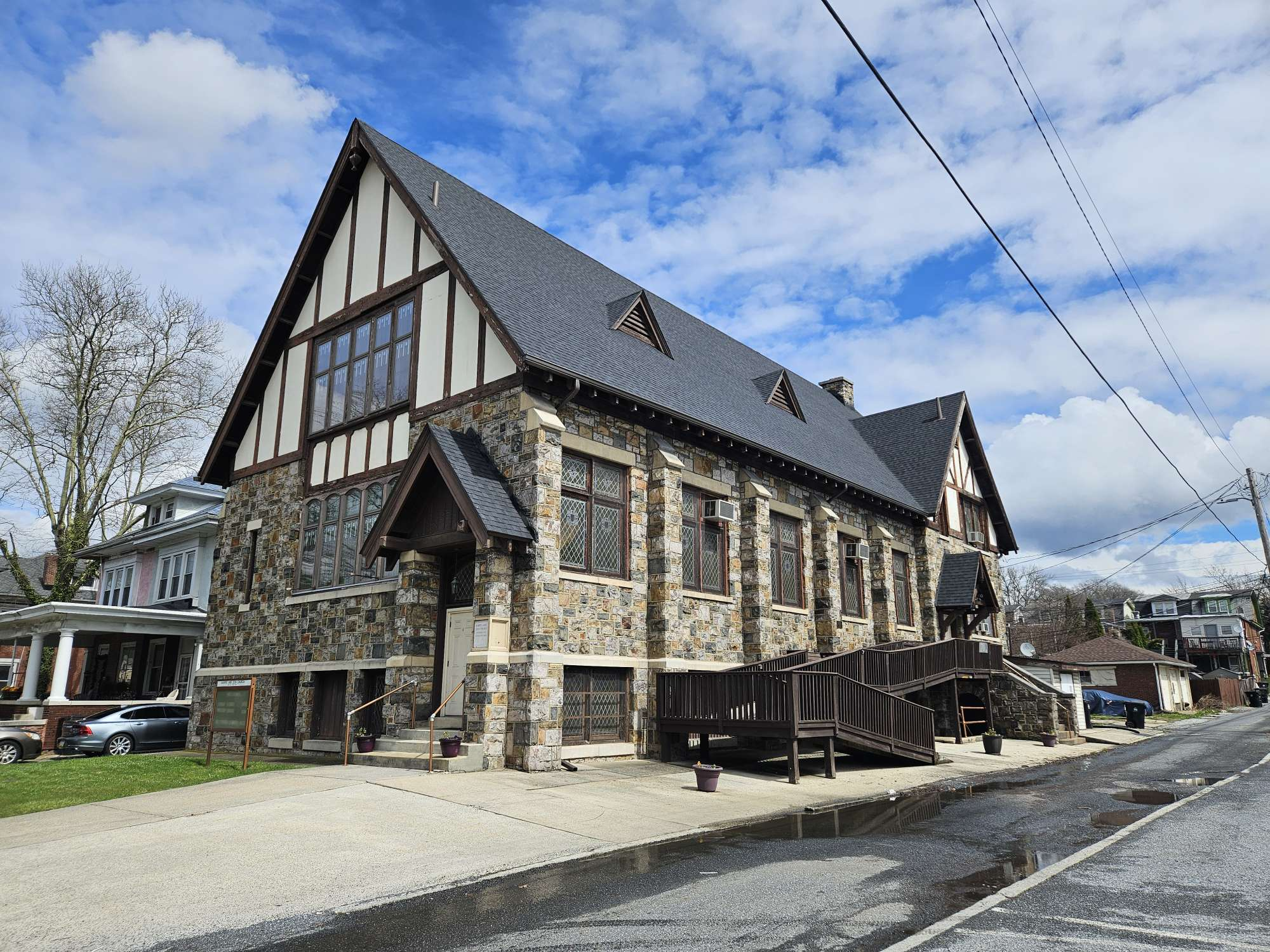
AME Zion Church in Harrisburg, Pennsylvania

=== Education ===
AME put a high premium on education. In the 19th century, the AME Church of Ohio collaborated with the Methodist Episcopal Church, a predominantly white denomination, in sponsoring the second independent historically black college (HBCU), Wilberforce University in Ohio. By 1880, AME operated over 2,000 schools, chiefly in the South, with 155,000 students. For school houses they used church buildings; the ministers and their wives were the teachers; the congregations raised the money to keep schools operating at a time the segregated public schools were starved of funds.

=== Bishop Turner ===
After the American Civil War, Bishop Henry McNeal Turner (1834–1915) was a major leader of the AME and played a role in Republican Party politics. In 1863 during the American Civil War, Turner was appointed as the first black chaplain in the United States Colored Troops. Afterward, he was appointed to the Freedmen's Bureau in Georgia. He settled in Macon, Georgia, and was elected to the state legislature in 1868 during Reconstruction. He planted many AME churches in Georgia after the war.

In 1880 he was elected as the first southern bishop of the AME Church after a fierce battle within the denomination. Angered by the Democrats' regaining power and instituting Jim Crow laws in the late nineteenth century South, Turner was the leader of black nationalism and proposed emigration of blacks to Africa.

=== Race ===
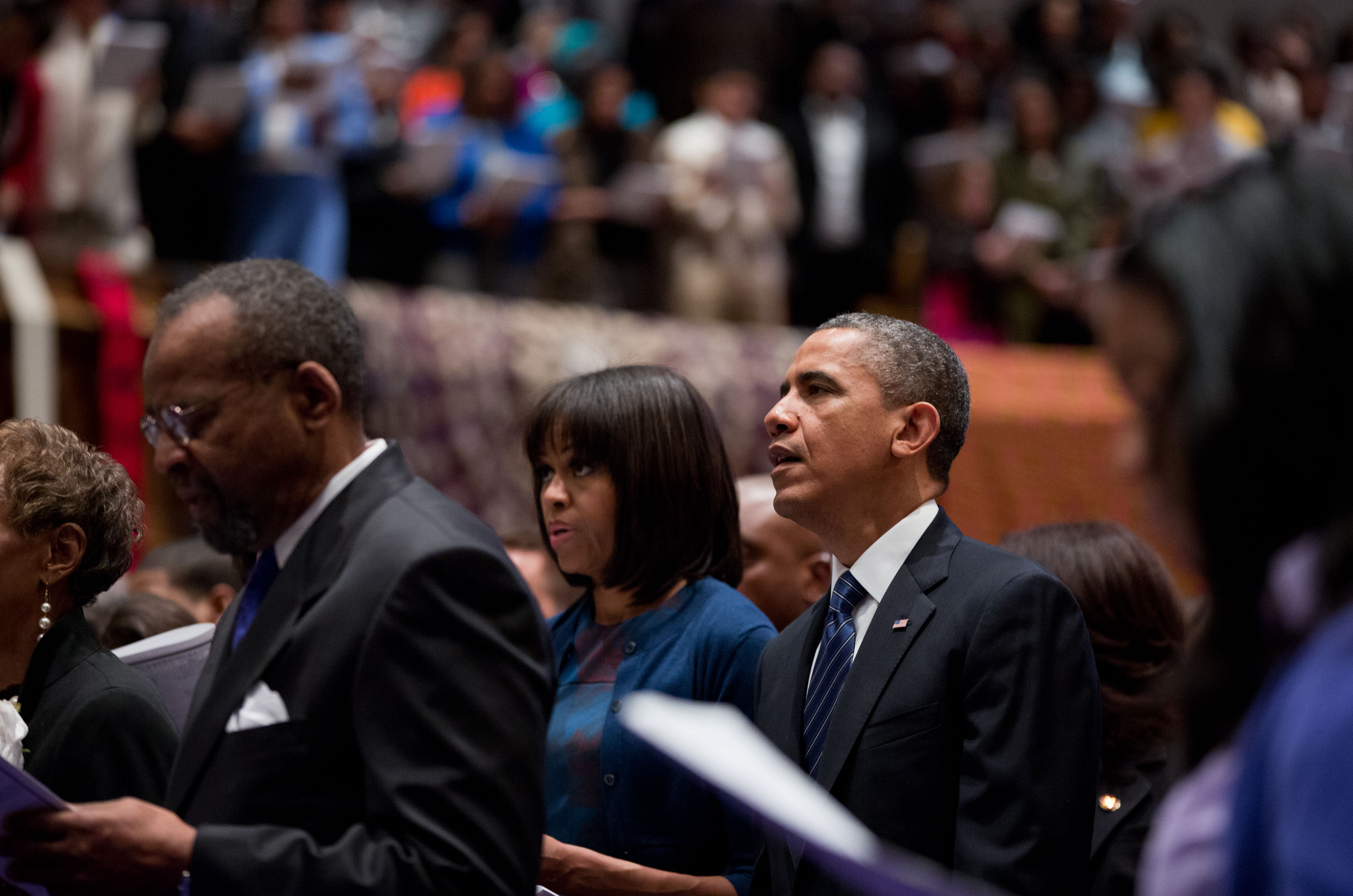
President Barack Obama and First Lady Michelle Obama attend a church service at Metropolitan African Methodist Episcopal Church in Washington, D.C., on January 20, 2013.

The African Methodist Episcopal Church has a unique history as it is the first major religious denomination in the western world that developed because of race rather than theological differences. It was the first African-American denomination organized and incorporated in the United States. The church was born in protest against racial discrimination and slavery. This was in keeping with the Methodist Church's philosophy, whose founder John Wesley had once called the slave-trade "that execrable sum of all villainies." In the 19th century, the AME Church of Ohio collaborated with the Methodist Episcopal Church, a predominantly white denomination, in sponsoring the second independent historically black college (HBCU), Wilberforce University in Ohio. Among Wilberforce University's early founders was Salmon P. Chase, then-governor of Ohio and the future Secretary of Treasury under President Abraham Lincoln.

Other members of the FAS wanted to affiliate with the Episcopal Church and followed Absalom Jones in doing that. In 1792, they founded the African Episcopal Church of St. Thomas, the first Episcopal church in the United States with a founding black congregation. In 1804, Jones was ordained as the first black priest in the Episcopal Church.

While the AME is doctrinally Methodist, clergy, scholars, and lay persons have written works that demonstrate the distinctive racial theology and praxis that have come to define this Wesleyan body. W. E. B. DuBois, who as Martin E. Marty points out was "hardly an admirer of organized religion," still called the AME "the greatest Negro organization in the world". In an address to the 1893 World's Parliament of Religions, Bishop Benjamin W. Arnett reminded the audience of blacks' influence in the formation of Christianity. Bishop Benjamin T. Tanner wrote in 1895 in The Color of Solomon – What? that biblical scholars wrongly portrayed the son of David as a white man. In the post-civil rights era, theologians James Cone, Cecil W. Cone, and Jacqueline Grant, who came from the AME tradition, criticized Euro-centric Christianity and African-American churches for their shortcomings in resolving the plight of those oppressed by racism, sexism, and economic disadvantage.

== Statistics ==
The World Council of Churches estimates the membership of the AME Church at around 2,510,000; 3,817 pastors, 21 bishops and 7,000 congregations.

== Organization ==
=== General Conference ===
The General Conference is the supreme body of the African Methodist Episcopal Church. It is composed of the bishops, as ex officio presidents, according to the rank of election, and an equal number of ministerial and lay delegates, elected by each of the annual conferences and the lay electoral colleges of the annual conferences. Other ex officio members are: the general officers, college presidents, deans of theological seminaries; and chaplains in the regular United States Armed Forces. The General Conference meets every four years, but may have extra sessions in certain emergencies.

At the General Conference of the AME Church, notable and renowned speakers have been invited to address the clergy and laity of the congregation. Such as in 2008, the church invited then Senator Barack H. Obama, and in 2012, the church invited then First Lady of the United States Michelle Obama.

=== Council of Bishops ===
The Council of Bishops is the executive branch of the church. It has the general oversight of the church during the interim between general conferences. The AME Council of Bishops shall meet annually at such time and place as the majority of the council shall determine and also at such other times as may be deemed necessary in the discharging its responsibility as the executive branch of the African Methodist Episcopal Church. This council shall hold at least two public sessions at each annual meeting. At the first, complaints and petitions against a bishop shall be heard, at the second, the decisions of the council shall be made public. All decisions shall be in writing.

=== Board of Incorporators ===
The Board of Incorporators, also known as the General Board of Trustees, has the supervision, in trust, of all connectional property of the church and is vested with authority to act in behalf of the AME Church wherever necessary.

=== General Board ===
The AME General Board is in many respects the administrative body and comprises various departmental commissions made up of the respective treasurer/CFO, the secretary/CIO of the AME Church, the treasurer/CFO and the members of the various commissions, and one bishop as presiding officer with the other bishops associating.

=== Judicial Council ===
The Judicial Council is the highest judicatory body of the African Methodist Episcopal Church. It is an appellate court, elected by the General Conference and is amenable to it.

=== Bishops ===
==== Four Horsemen: important bishops ====
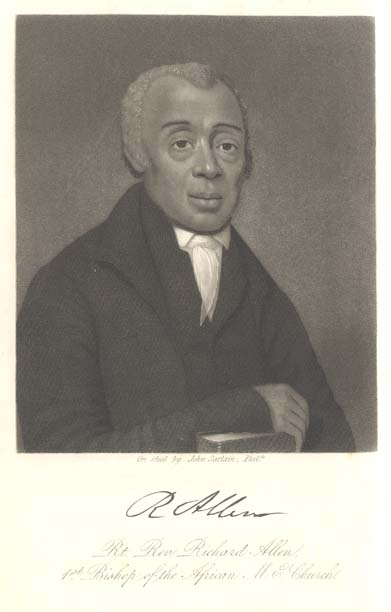
Richard Allen, founder and first bishop (1816–1841)

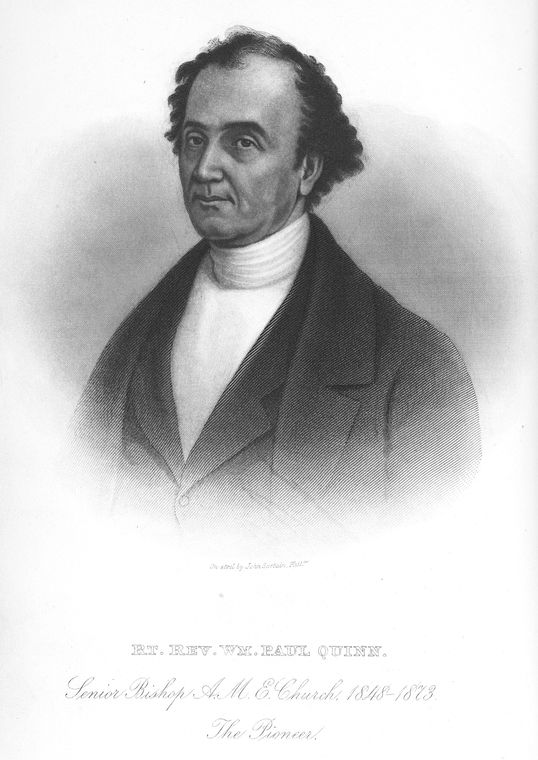
William Paul Quinn, fourth bishop (1849–1873)

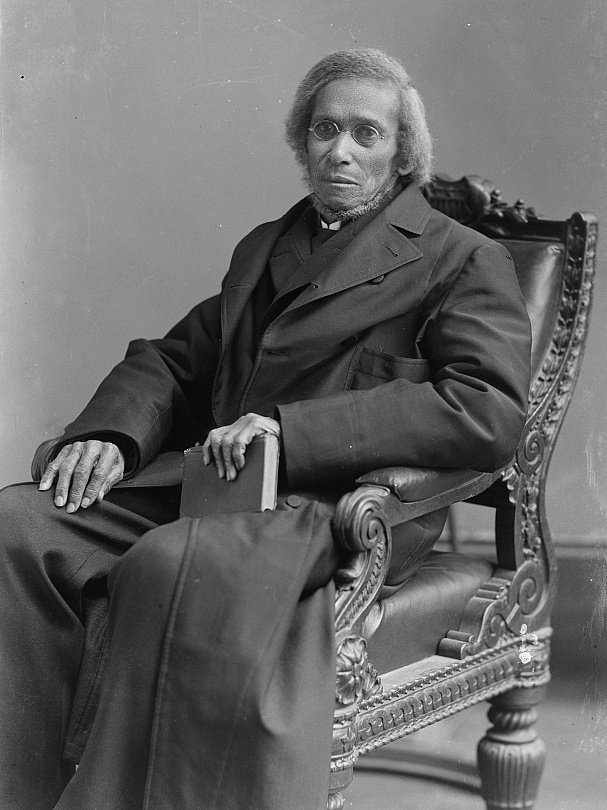
Daniel Payne, sixth bishop (1811–1893)

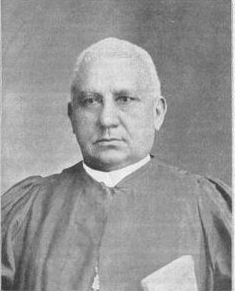
Henry McNeal Turner, twelfth bishop (1834–1915)

==== Current bishops and assignments ====
- 1st Episcopal District – Bishop Samuel L. Green, Sr.
- 2nd Episcopal District – Bishop Harry L. Seawright
- 3rd Episcopal District – Bishop Stafford J. N. Wicker
- 4th Episcopal District – Bishop Frederick A. Wright
- 5th Episcopal District – Bishop Francine A. Brookins, Esq.
- 6th Episcopal District – Bishop Michael L. Mitchell
- 7th Episcopal District – Bishop James L. Davis
- 8th Episcopal District – Bishop Erika D. Crawford
- 9th Episcopal District – Bishop Julius H. McAllister, Jr.
- 10th Episcopal District – Bishop Ronnie E. Brailsford, Sr.
- 11th Episcopal District – Bishop Marvin C. Zanders, II
- 12th Episcopal District – Bishop Silvester S. Beaman
- 13th Episcopal District – Bishop Jeffery B. Cooper, Sr.
- 14th Episcopal District – Bishop Paul J. M. Kawimbe
- 15th Episcopal District – Bishop Henry A. Belin, III
- 16th Episcopal District – Bishop Jeffrey N. Leath
- 17th Episcopal District – Bishop Vernon R. Byrd, Jr., Esq.
- 18th Episcopal District – Bishop Jeffery B. Cooper, Sr.
- 19th Episcopal District – Senior Bishop Wilfred J. Messiah
- 20th Episcopal District – Bishop Gregory V. Eason, Sr.
- Ecumenical Officer and Endorsing Agent– Bishop David R. Daniels, Jr.

==== Retired bishops ====
- Bishop Frank C. Cummings*
- Bishop Philip R. Cousin, Sr.
- Bishop John R. Bryant
- Bishop Robert V. Webster*
- Bishop T. Larry Kirkland
- Bishop Adam J. Richardson Jr.
- Bishop Vashti M. McKenzie
- Bishop Gregory G.M. Ingram
- Bishop Preston W. Williams, II
- Bishop Carolyn Tyler Guidry
- Bishop Julius H. McAllister, Sr.
- Bishop John F. White, Sr.
- Bishop Clement W. Fugh
- Bishop E. Anne Henning-Byfield*
- Bishop Frank M. Reid, III
- Bishop McKinley Young*

* Deceased

== Ecumenism ==
The African Methodist Episcopal Church cooperates with other Methodist bodies through the World Methodist Council and Wesleyan Holiness Connection.

In May 2012, the African Methodist Episcopal Church entered into full communion with the racially-integrated United Methodist Church, and the predominantly black/African American members of the African Methodist Episcopal Zion Church, African Union Methodist Protestant Church, Christian Methodist Episcopal Church, and Union American Methodist Episcopal Church, in which these churches agreed to "recognize each other's churches, share sacraments, and affirm their clergy and ministries", bringing a semblance of unity and reconciliation to those church bodies which follow in the footsteps of John and Charles Wesley.

== Doctrine ==
The AME motto, "God Our Father, Christ Our Redeemer, Holy Spirit Our Comforter, Humankind Our Family", reflects the basic beliefs of the African Methodist Episcopal Church.

The basic foundations of the beliefs of the church can be summarized in the Apostles' Creed, and the 25 Articles of Religion, held in common with other Methodist denominations. The church also observes the official bylaws of the AME Church. The "Doctrine and Discipline of the African Methodist Episcopal Church" is revised at every AME General Conference and published every four years. The AME Church also follows the rule that a minister of the denomination must retire at age 75, with bishops, more specifically, being required to retire upon the general conference nearest their 75th birthday.

=== Social issues ===
The AME Church is active regarding issues of social justice and has invested time in reforming the criminal justice system. The AME Church also opposes "elective abortion". On women's issues, the AME has supported gender equality and, in 2000, first elected a woman to become bishop.

While always being open to people of all racial backgrounds, the AME has advocated for the civil and human rights of ethnic minorities, such as African Americans, through social improvement, religious autonomy, and political engagement.

The African Methodist Episcopal Church unanimously voted to forbid ministers from blessing same-sex unions in July 2004. The church leaders stated that homosexual activity "clearly contradicts [their] understanding of Scripture" and that the call of the African Methodist Episcopal Church "is to hear the voice of God in our Scriptures". In the same year, the General Conference voted to "appoint a sexual ethics discernment committee to make recommendations to the denomination about LGBTQ matters." As of 2015, "the AME Church's Doctrine and Discipline [had] no explicit policy regarding gay clergy." Regarding LGBT clergy, in 2003, Bishop Richard Franklin Norris declared his position for his region of the African Methodist Episcopal Church and instructed pastors of the denomination to read it to their congregations:

The official position of the African Methodist Episcopal Church is not in favor of the ordination of openly gay persons to the ranks of clergy in our church. This position reaffirms our published position papers, public statements and prior rulings, all of which indicate that we do not support the ordination of openly gay persons.

In 2021, the AME General Conference voted against a motion to allow same-sex marriages in church, but confirmed that "it does not bar LGBTQ individuals from serving as pastors or otherwise leading the denomination." The same AME General Conference voted "to appoint a sexual ethics discernment committee to make recommendations to the denomination about LGBTQ matters." In 2024, the AME General Conference voted against allowing same-sex marriage, the vote was 896 to 722; following that vote, the Conference voted to continue the "sexual ethics discernment committee" through 2028.

The AME Church voted to take "a stand against climate change".

== Schools ==
The African Methodist Episcopal Church has been one of the forerunners of education within the African-American community.

Former colleges and universities of the AME Church:

- Bishop Ward Normal and Collegiate Institute (1883–1890), Huntsville, Texas
- Campbell College (Mississippi) (1890–1964), Jackson, Mississippi; now part of Jackson State University
- Turner Normal and Industrial School (1886–1932), Shelbyville, Tennessee, moved to Memphis in 1930
- Wayman Institute (1890–1919), Harrodsburg, Kentucky
- Western University (1865–1943), Quindaro, Kansas

Senior colleges within the United States:

- Allen University, Columbia, South Carolina
- Edward Waters College, Jacksonville, Florida
- Morris Brown College, Atlanta, Georgia
- Paul Quinn College, Dallas, Texas
- Wilberforce University, Wilberforce, Ohio

Junior colleges within the United States:

- Shorter College, North Little Rock, Arkansas

Theological seminaries within the United States:

- Dickerson-Green Theological Seminary
- Jackson Theological Seminary
- Payne Theological Seminary
- Turner Theological Seminary

Foreign colleges and universities:

- African Methodist Episcopal University, Liberia
- RR Wright Theological Seminary, South Africa

== Notable people ==
- Sarah Allen (1764–1849), Richard Allen's wife, who founded the Daughters of the Conference.
- Bishop Vinton Randolph Anderson (1927–2014), first African American to be elected President of the World Council of Churches, headquarters in Geneva, Switzerland (served 1991–1998); author of My Soul Shouts and subject of an edited work (Gayraud Wilmore & Louis Charles Harvey, editors), A Model of A Servant Bishop; first native Bermudian elected a bishop in any church/denomination.
- Harriet Baker (1829–1913), Pennsylvania evangelist and one of the earliest African American women authorized to preach in the AME Church.
- Daniel Blue (1796–1884), founder of the Saint Andrews African Methodist Episcopal Church in Sacramento, California; the first AME church on the West Coast and the first black church in California.
- H. H. Brookins (1925-2012), bishop and political power broker
- John M. Brown (1817–1893) bishop, leader in the Underground Railroad. He helped open a number of churches and schools, including the Payne Institute which became Allen University in Columbia, South Carolina and Paul Quinn College in Waco, Texas. He was also an early principal of Union Seminary which became Wilberforce University
- Jamal Harrison Bryant (born 1971), founded Empowerment Temple (AME Church) in Baltimore in 2000 with a congregation of 43 people. Today more than 7,500 members attend weekly services at this large influential congregation.
- Bishop Richard Harvey Cain, elected member of U.S. House of Representatives from South Carolina during Reconstruction era.
- Bishop William D. Chappelle (1857–1925), was president of Allen University in Columbia, South Carolina from 1897 to 1899.
- Daniel Coker (1780–1846), born "Issac Wright" in Baltimore, Maryland to mixed-race parents. Famous preacher and abolitionist. Ordained deacon in the new Methodist Episcopal Church by Bishop Francis Asbury in 1802 in Baltimore. Led Bethel AME Church in Baltimore. Participated in the organization of the national AME Church in Philadelphia in 1816. By 1820, sent as missionary to Sierra Leone, British colony in West Africa and considered founder of national Methodist Church there.
- Dennis C. Dickerson, Director of the Research and Scholarship and Professor at Vanderbilt University (retired).
- Bishop William Heard (1850–1937), AME minister and educator. Appointed by the U.S. government as "Minister Resident/Consul General" to Republic of Liberia, (1895–1898).
- King Solomon Dupont, AME clergy member who in the 1950s was the first African-American to seek public office in northern Florida since the Reconstruction era; in 1955, as Vice President of the Tallahassee Civic Association, he led a bus boycott, in which protesters lives were threatened, simultaneous to the Montgomery bus boycott led by Martin Luther King Jr. in Montgomery, Alabama.
- Orishatukeh Faduma, (1855–1946), African American missionary and educator.
- Floyd H. Flake (born 1945), former U.S. Congressman from New York State (1986–1998); senior pastor of the Greater Allen AME Cathedral in Jamaica, New York; former President of Wilberforce University
- Sarah E. Gorham, first female missionary from AME church, dying in Liberia in 1894.
- Bishop Carolyn Tyler Guidry (born 1937), second female AME bishop in church history.
- Bishop Vashti Murphy McKenzie, first female AME bishop in church history, best-selling author.
- Lyman S. Parks (1917–2009), Mayor of Grand Rapids, Michigan (1971–1976); Pastor of First Community AME Church in Grand Rapids.
- Bishop Daniel Payne (1811–1893), historian, educator and AME minister. First African-American president of an African-American university, Wilberforce University, in the U.S.
- Bishop Reverdy Cassius Ransom (1861–1959), one of the founders of NAACP via The Niagara Movement.
- T. W. Stringer (1815–1897), a freeman from Canada and first pastor of Bethel AME Church of Vicksburg in Vicksburg, Mississippi, founded in 1864 as Mississippi's first AME church. At Bethel AME in Vickbsurg, he established the T.W. Stringer Grand Lodge of Freemasonry, Mississippi's first Masonic Lodge.
- Frank M. Reid III (born 1951), Pastor of the Bethel AME Church in Baltimore from 1988 to 2016. Reid started The Bethel Outreach of Love Broadcast; Bethel was the first AME Church to have an international TV broadcast. Was selected as the 26th most influential person in Baltimore by local regional publication, Baltimore Magazine. His congregation's members include the mayor and city comptroller of Baltimore. He consulted for the TV show Amen, and guest starred several times on the popular HBO cable TV series The Wire. As of 2016, he was elevated to episcopal service as the 138th bishop of the AME Church.
- Hiram Rhodes Revels, first African American to serve in the United States Senate, representing Mississippi from 1870 to 1871.
- Calvin H. Sydnor III, the 20th Editor of The Christian Recorder, the official newspaper of the African Methodist Episcopal Church (www.the-Christian-recorder.org)
- Bishop Benjamin Tucker Tanner (1835–1923), author of An Apology for African Methodism (1867), editor of the Christian Recorder, AME publication, and founder of the AME Church Review. As a bishop, presided over AME parishes, first, in Canada, Bermuda, and the West Indies, later, in New England, New York, New Jersey, and eastern Pennsylvania.
- D. Ormonde Walker, 66th bishop of the AME Church and 10th president of Wilberforce University
- Thomas Marcus Decatur Ward (1823–1894), AME missionary, preacher, church leader, and abolitionist
- Bishop Alexander Walker Wayman (1821–1895), born free in Caroline County, Maryland, joined AME Church in 1840, ordained minister three years later. Served as minister of Bethel AME Church in Baltimore (founded 1785), then located on East Saratoga near North Charles, St. Paul Street/Place (currently Preston Gardens), and North Calvert Streets, led "Negro/Colored" delegation in President Abraham Lincoln's funeral procession through Baltimore during stop during train trip back to Springfield, Illinois, April 1865. Lived on Hamilton Street alley behind First Unitarian Church off North Charles and West Franklin Streets.
- Jamye Coleman Williams (1918–2022), educator, community leader. Former editor of the AME Church Review; recipient of the NAACP Presidential Award (1999).
- Rev Clive Pillay (born 1953): community leader. Field Reporter The Christian Recorder, Former Founder ICY: UDF – Inter Church Youth
- Jarena Lee (1783–1864): First woman preacher in the AME church given the blessing to do so by founder, Richard Allen. Prominent AME leader in the Wesleyan-Holiness movement. The First African American woman in the United States to have an autobiography published.
- Juliann Jane Tillman: woman preacher in the AME Church, was well known for her widely reproduced 1844 lithograph portrait.

== See also ==
- A.M.E. Church Review, quarterly journal of the African Methodist Episcopal Church
- Religion of Black Americans
- African Methodist Episcopal Zion Church
- Black church
- British Methodist Episcopal Church in Canada
- Christian Methodist Episcopal Church
- Churches Uniting in Christ (formerly the Consultation on Church Union [COCU] – founded 1960).
- List of African Methodist Episcopal churches
- Christianity in the United States
- Category:African Methodist Episcopal bishops
- Category:Universities and colleges affiliated with the African Methodist Episcopal Church
- 14th District of the African Methodist Episcopal Church
