= The Extra Mile =

National monument in Washington D.C.

Coordinates: 38.8955°N 77.0336°W

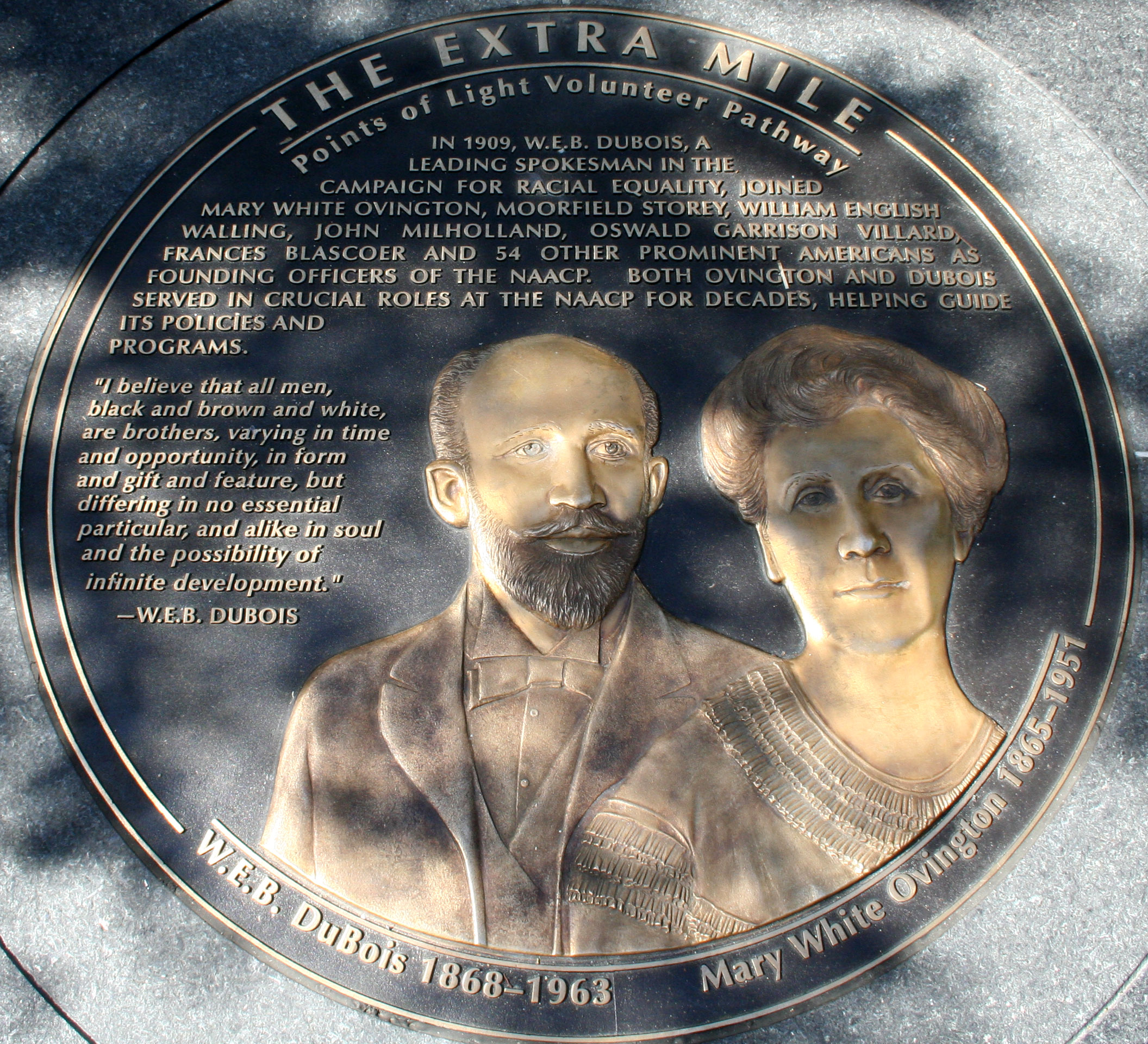
The marker on The Extra Mile, depicting W. E. B. Du Bois (left) and Mary White Ovington (right) in 2006

The Extra Mile – Points of Light Volunteer Pathway is a memorial in Washington D.C. Located adjacent to the White House, the monument is composed of 34 bronze medallions honoring people who "through their caring and personal sacrifice, reached out to others, building their dreams into movements that helped people across America and throughout the world". The medallions, every 42 inches in diameter, are embedded in sidewalks that form a one-mile walking path bounded by Pennsylvania Avenue, 15th Street, G Street, and 11th Street, NW. Each medallion includes a bas-relief likeness of one or more honorees, a description of their achievement and a quotation.

The Extra Mile was founded by John A. Johansen in 1992. Planning and development for the monument were managed by the Make a Difference Foundation until its merger with the Points of Light Foundation in 2002. The Extra Mile memorial was dedicated on October 14, 2005 in a ceremony attended by President George H. W. Bush and Barbara Bush.

== Extra Mile Honorees ==
- Jane Addams – Founder, Hull House
- Edgar Allen – Founder, Easter Seals
- Ethel Percy Andrus – Founder, AARP
- Susan B. Anthony – Suffragist
- Roger Nash Baldwin – Founder, American Civil Liberties Union
- Ruth Standish Baldwin / Dr. George Haynes – Founders, National Urban League
- Ida Wells-Barnett – Leader of the anti-Lynching movement
- Clara Barton – Founder, American Red Cross
- Clifford Beers – Founder of the modern mental healthcare movement
- Ballington & Maud Booth – Founders, Volunteers of America
- William D. Boyce – Founder, Boy Scouts of America
- Wallace Campbell – Founder, CARE
- Rachel Carson – Environmentalist
- Cesar Chavez – Co-founder, United Farm Workers of America
- Ernest Kent Coulter – Founder, Big Brothers/Big Sisters of America
- Dorothea Dix – Advocate of the Reform of Institutions for the Mentally Ill
- Frederick Douglass – abolitionist
- Millard & Linda Fuller – Founder and Co-founder, Habitat for Humanity
- Hector Garcia – Founder, American G.I. Forum
- Samuel Gompers – Founder, American Federation of Labor
- Charlotte & Luther Gulick – Founder, Camp Fire
- William Edwin Hall – President, Boys and Girls Clubs of America
- Paul Harris – Founder, Rotary International
- Dorothy Height – Civil Rights Leader
- Edgar J. Helms – Founder, Goodwill Industries
- Melvin Jones – Founder, International Association of Lions Clubs
- Helen Keller – Founder, American Foundation for the Blind
- Martin Luther King Jr. – Civil Rights Leader
- Juliette Gordon Low – Founder, Girl Scouts of the USA
- John Muir – Conservationist
- Mary White Ovington / W. E. B. Du Bois – Founders, NAACP
- Eunice Kennedy Shriver – Founder, Special Olympics
- Robert Smith/William Wilson – Co-founders, Alcoholics Anonymous
- Harriet Tubman – Leader of Underground Railroad Effort to Free Slaves
- Booker T. Washington – Civil Rights Leader
