= May Childs Nerney =

American civil rights activist

Executive Secretary of the NAACP
- In office 1912–1916
- Preceded by: Mary White Ovington
- Succeeded by: Mary White Ovington

Personal details
- Born: October 26, 1876 Troy, New York, U.S.
- Died: December 17, 1959 (aged 83) West Orange, New Jersey, U.S.
- Education: Cornell University (BA); Columbia University (BLS)

May Childs Nerney (also known as Mary; (Note: According to historian Melvyn Stokes, Nerney was inconsistent as to whether she signed her name as "May" or "Mary", but "used May as her Christian name on most occasions.") 1876/1877 – December 17, 1959) was an American civil rights activist and librarian. She was the secretary of the NAACP from 1912 to 1916, overseeing a large increase in the organization's size. She led protests against the segregation of federal government employees in Washington, D.C., and against the film The Birth of a Nation (1915). Nerney came into conflict with several members of the organization and resigned in 1916. She later worked on cataloging Thomas Edison's papers and published a 1934 biography on him, Thomas A. Edison, A Modern Olympian. She also worked with the League of Women Voters, the board of the Young Women's Christian Association, the Consumers Cooperative Services, and the New York Philharmonic Society.

== Early life ==
May Childs Nerney was born in 1876 or 1877. She received degrees from Cornell University in 1902, and, three years later, the New York State Library School of Columbia University. After graduation, she was employed at the New York State Library, running their book purchases and history section. In 1910, Nerney left the New York State Library and accepted a position at the California State Library. As an experienced and educated librarian, Nerney was offered a position by California's state librarian, James Louis Gillis, as part of his efforts to develop the state's library. At the time California had no library school. Nerney moved to California with her mother, but only remained a few months before moving to New Jersey in October 1911. She was hired by the Newark Public Library in 1911. Nerney worked there as a reference librarian until 1912.

== NAACP involvement ==
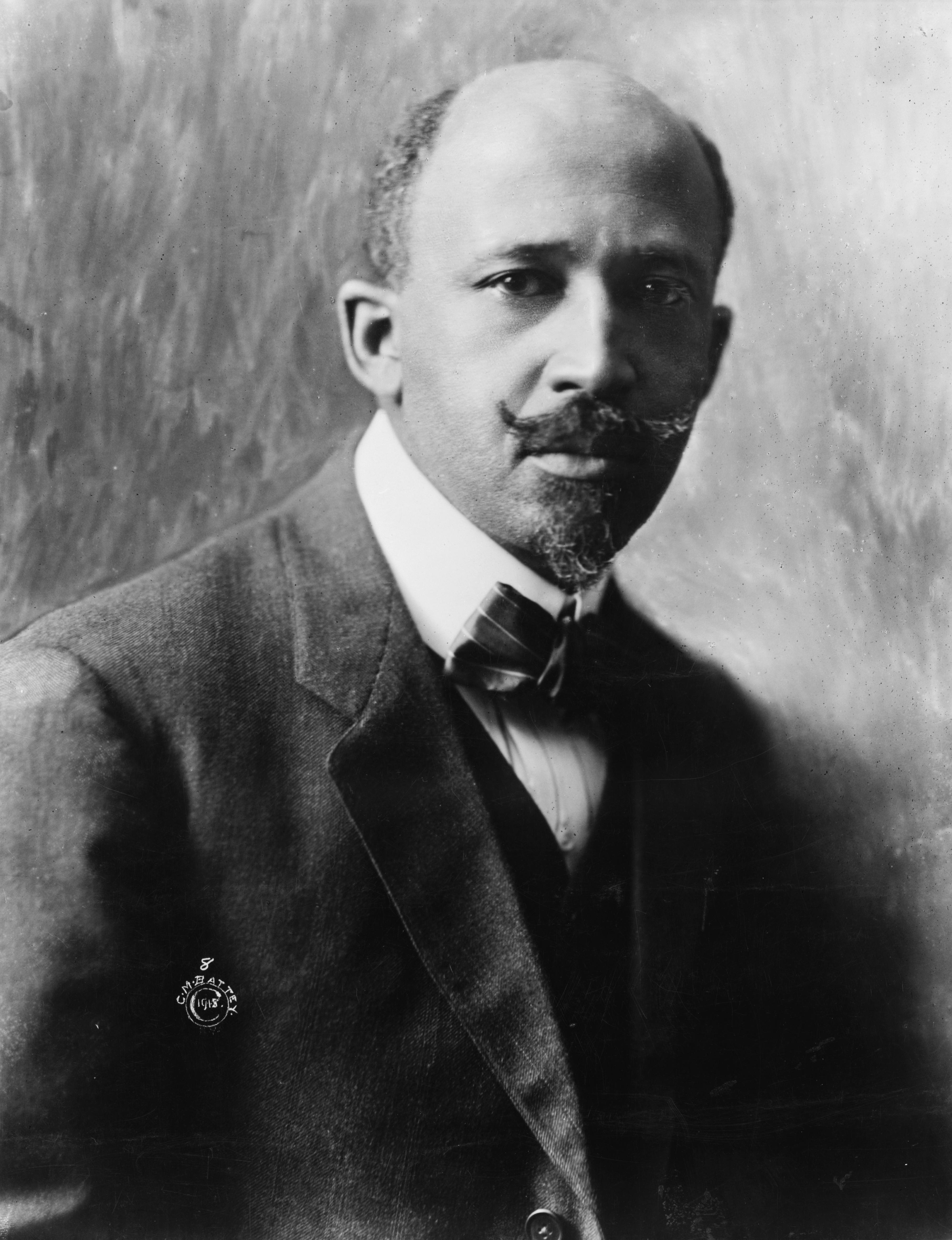
W. E. B. Du Bois in 1918

The National Association for the Advancement of Colored People (NAACP) was founded in 1909 as an organization to advocate for civil rights of African-Americans in the United States. Its board initially controlled the organization and generally was first led by white Progressives and W. E. B. Du Bois, a prominent Black intellectual. While the organization's secretariat shifted over the next several decades to become predominantly Black, the first four secretaries of the NAACP were white— a Black secretary was not permanently appointed until James Weldon Johnson in 1920.

In 1912 Nerney was hired as secretary of the NAACP on the basis of her "obvious executive ability." She worked to expand the NAACP through fundraising, growing its membership, expanding the branch system, and managing general organization and coordination. In 1967, historians Elliott Rudwick and August Meier described Nerney as one of the two most important white secretaries to hold the post of secretary of the NAACP before 1920, along with John R. Shillady, and the most effective. They describe her as "a prodigious worker ... also temperamental, tactless with colleagues, and inept at organizational infighting." She was very cognizant of the fact that she was white and led an organization aimed at improving the lives of Black people, and advocated for the NAACP to be predominantly led by Black people.

Historians Rudwick and Meier consider Nerney's most important work as secretary to have been her oversight of a dramatic increase in the NAACP's size. In her four-year stint as secretary, the organization grew from just 300 members across three branches, to 10,000 and 63 branches. She personally traveled around the country and was in communication with many members of the organization. Nerney also advocated for transitioning the group to fundraising predominantly from Black members rather than relying on large donations from white supporters, a move that was supported by members such as Joel Spingarn, who chaired the board.

Nerney worked to increase the NAACP's publicity as well, working on many press releases and drawing attention to events. She coordinated legal efforts and would discuss cases with lawyers and investigate happenings, for instance determining that residential segregation in Richmond, Virginia, would not make a good test case. Rudwick and Meier describe procedures that she and Arthur B. Spingarn, who chaired the legal committee, developed as becoming "standard operations" for the NAACP.

=== Campaigns and resignation ===
In 1913 Nerney led campaigns protesting segregation of clerks in the federal government, twice visiting Washington, D.C., and she published a report on the situation titled Segregation in the Government Departments at Washington, which included interviews she had conducted with Black government employees describing segregated working conditions in federal workplaces. She also managed a publicity campaign that included efforts to write letters to the government over the issue. The report was eventually widely publicized, including by the Associated Press—the NAACP later claimed it reached "600 dailies, the colored press and secret societies, 50 religious papers, the radical press [...] all members of Congress, except southerners, magazines, and [...] a list of individuals who might be interested."

When the controversial film The Birth of a Nation was released in 1915, the NAACP attempted to get it banned or have some scenes cut. Nerney supported attempts to organize a re-filming of the movie as well as state-wide protests, including in Ohio. At times she advocated for more power to be granted to the NAACP secretary role and sought to use her contacts on the board and in lower leadership to galvanize change. For instance, she successfully sought to award the first Spingarn Medal to a scientist, Ernest Everett Just, by pressuring Archibald Grimké and Charles Bentley. She frequently came into conflict with other leaders of the NAACP, including Oswald Garrison Villard, Mary White Ovington, and Du Bois. Nerney was described by Du Bois as having "excellent spirit and indefatigable energy" but wrote that she had "a violent temperature and [was] depressingly suspicious of motives."

As conflict between Nerney and Du Bois increased, she submitted a resignation in February 1913 over a disagreement about Du Bois's secretary. She remained secretary and by November was aligned with Du Bois in efforts to strip Villard, at the time the NAACP's chair, of his power. Villard resigned before their plans were actioned. Throughout 1913 and onwards, tensions over the white leadership of the NAACP became increasingly noticeable; Du Bois wrote that Nerney "hasn't an ounce of conscious prejudice, but her every step is unconsciously along the color line." The majority of NAACP members, including Grimké continued to support the interracialness of the NAACP.

In July 1914 tensions between Nerney and Du Bois came to a head after Nerney refused to support Du Bois presenting his opinions on laws restricting interracial marriage as NAACP policy. This convinced Du Bois that she had "discredited me behind my back." Rudwick and Meier suggest that Nerney in turn saw Du Bois's use of the NAACP magazine The Crisis as "a personal weapon" he was using to take control of the organization himself. She feared one person's control of the NAACP and instead proposed a three-person "executive committee". This was not successful.

A 1914 financial crisis impeded the NAACP's fundraising efforts and the organization was forced to cut its budget. Nerney continued to work for the organization, but became less convinced it was effective, and her rifts continued to grow with several members. In January 1916 she stepped down from the post. She requested that she be replaced by a Black person, offering several suggestions such as Jessie Fauset, but Roy Nash was instead placed in the role. Historian Adam Fairclough described Nerney in 2002 as a "driving force behind the NAACP's early development." A 2004 profile credited her with "laying the fundamental groundwork for what would arise as the most powerful organization battling racial injustice."

She also worked with the League of Women Voters, the board of the Young Women's Christian Association, the Consumers Cooperative Services, and the New York Philharmonic Society.

== Thomas Edison ==
In 1928 Nerney was hired to work at the Edison Laboratory where she was the secretary of historical research, and worked to catalog Thomas Edison's papers. She subsequently wrote a biography on Edison because she did not think an adequate biography of Edison had been written. The book, Thomas A. Edison, A Modern Olympian, was published in 1934 by Harrison Smith and Robert Haas and was 334 pages long. Nerney had interviewed Edison for the book, and spent two years preparing papers for the work before writing it, including many anecdotes about Edison. A contemporary review by Waldemar Kaempffert wished the book had more substance than anecdotes and was more revealing about Edison.

== Later life ==
Nerney left the Edison Laboratory to work at the Newark Library for a decade before her 1948 retirement. She died on December 17, 1959, at the age of eighty three.

== Bibliography ==
- Kellogg, Charles Flint (1967). NAACP : a history of the National Association for the Advancement of Colored People; volume I 1909–1920. Johns Hopkins Press. ISBN 978-0-8018-0331-4.
- Rudwick, Elliott; Meier, August (1976). "The Rise of the Black Secretariat in the NAACP, 1909-35". In Kellogg, Charles Flint (ed.). Along the color line, explorations in the Black experience : [essays]. University of Illinois Press. ISBN 978-0-252-00636-4.
- Fairclough, Adam (2002). Better Day Coming: Blacks and Equality, 1890-2000. Penguin. ISBN 978-1-4406-8416-6.
- Stross, Randall E. (2008). The Wizard of Menlo Park: How Thomas Alva Edison Invented the Modern World. Three Rivers Press. ISBN 978-1-4000-4763-5.
- Patler, Nicholas (2004). Jim Crow and the Wilson administration : protesting federal segregation in the early twentieth century. University Press of Colorado. ISBN 978-0-87081-760-1.
