= Big Brothers Big Sisters of New York City =

Big Brothers Big Sisters of NYC
- Abbreviation: BBBS of NYC
- Formation: 1904
- Type: Non-governmental organization
- Purpose: Mentoring
- Headquarters: New York, NY
- Region served: New York, NY
- Executive Director: Alicia D. Guevara
- Parent organization: BBBSA
- Website: www.bigsnyc.org

Big Brothers Big Sisters of NYC is a 501(c)(3) non-profit organization based in New York City whose mission is to help children reach their potential through professionally supported, one-to-one relationships with mentors that try to have a measurable impact on youth. Big Brothers Big Sisters of NYC is one of the oldest and largest youth mentoring organizations in the United States, and mentor over 2,500 children annually.

== History ==
In 1904, a young New York City court clerk named Ernest Kent Coulter was seeing many boys come through his courtroom. He recognized that caring adults could help many of these boys stay out of trouble, so in 1904, he set out to find volunteers and made his famous plea:

"There is only one possible way to save that youngster, and that is to have some earnest, true man volunteer to be his big brother. To look after him, to help him do right, to make the little chap feel that there is at least one human being in this great city who takes a personal interest in him, who cares whether he lives or dies. I call for a volunteer."

That marked the beginning of Big Brothers Big Sisters of New York City and the Big Brothers movement.

Coulter's audience, a New York City men's club of business and community leaders, immediately saw the strength of this idea. By the end of the day, 39 men had volunteered.

By 1916, Big Brothers had spread to 96 cities across the country.

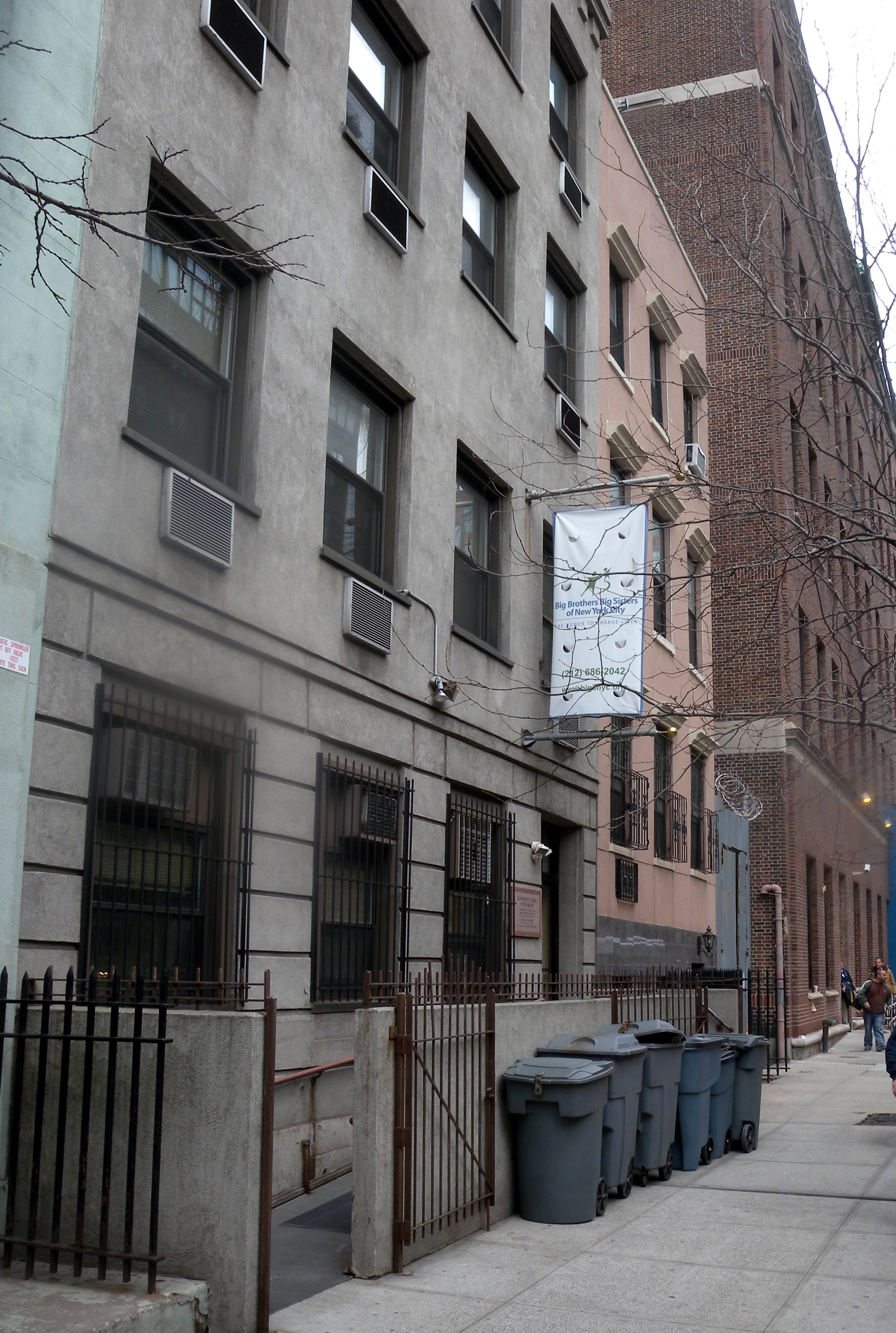
Headquarters

=== Historical Timeline ===
- 1902 Coulter, a court clerk, helps organize the first New York Children's Court, under Judge Julius Mayer; Ladies of Charity, later Catholic Big Sisters of New York, starts to befriend girls who come before the New York Children's Court
- 1904 Ernest Coulter founds the organized Big Brothers movement by obtaining 39 volunteers, who each agree to befriend one boy
- 1912 The New York Times reports Big Brothers activity in 26 cities
- 1914 Ernest Coulter embarks on a nationwide lecture tour on behalf of Big Brothers; planning begins for a national Big Brothers and Big Sisters organization
- 1916 Big Brothers work spreads to 96 cities
- 1917 The first national conference of Big Brothers and Big Sisters organizations is held in Grand Rapids, MI., leading to the later organization of the Big Brothers and Big Sisters Federation
- 1925 Big Brothers and Big Sisters Federation holds its first conference for agency executives; President Calvin Coolidge becomes patron of the Big Brothers and Big Sisters Federation
- 1930 Six hundred delegates attend a Big Brothers and Big Sisters Federation meeting in New York City
- 1934 President and Mrs. Franklin D. Roosevelt become patrons of Big Brothers and Big Sisters Federation
- 1940 National Committee on Big Brothers and Big Sisters service is created to continue to pursue the formation of a national group
- 1948 Norman Rockwell produces the sketch that becomes a symbol for the Big Brothers Association
- 1958 Big Brothers Association is chartered by Congress
- 1970 Big Sisters International is incorporated
- 1971 Big Brothers Association grows to 208 affiliates
- 1977 Big Sisters International and Big Brothers Association merge, forming Big Brothers Big Sisters of America with 357 agencies, mostly independent agencies with their own nonprofit
- 1990 Allan Luks takes over as executive director of Big Brothers Big sisters of NYC
- 2004 Big Brothers Big Sisters of New York City celebrates centennial anniversary
- 2008 The Honorable Michael Corriero takes over as executive director
- 2010 Jon May serves as interim executive director
- 2010 Hector Batista takes over as executive director
- 2019 Alicia Guevara joins as CEO
- 2020 BBBS of NYC launches virtual mentorship to continue assisting Littles during the COVID-19 pandemic

== Recent leadership ==
=== Alicia Guevara (2019–2024) ===
Alicia Guevara began serving on June 10, 2019, as the nonprofit's first woman CEO. With over 25 years of experience leading nonprofit organizations, she previously served as executive director of Part of the Solution, a neighborhood-based comprehensive human services agency.

Alicia expanded BBBS of NYC's reach and influence across New York City. One of her notable achievements was the launch of the College and Career Success program, which helped numerous young people pursue higher education and develop essential career skills. Additionally, she introduced an Open Gender Matching Policy, fostering inclusivity by ensuring that every child could be matched with the mentor best suited to their needs.

Alicia also played a key role in increasing BBBS of NYC's presence in the Bronx, her home borough. The "Be Big, Be Bronx" campaign significantly extended the organization's support in the area, connecting more Bronx youth with local mentors for guidance and support.

Alicia is a native New Yorker, a graduate of Columbia University, 2023 John Jay Award honoree, and holds an executive education certificate for senior leaders in nonprofit management from Columbia Business School.

=== Hector Batista (2010–2018) ===
In October 2010, Hector Batista was appointed as the new executive director of Big Brothers Big Sisters of New York City. He began his career in the Brooklyn Borough President's office, where he served as director of real estate for the Brooklyn Economic Development Corporation, director of economic development and director of development and finance. He was later appointed by New York City Mayor Rudolph W. Giuliani to serve as deputy commissioner and chief operating officer of the Department of Housing Preservation and Development. Batista also served as executive vice president of the New York Metropolitan Region of the American Cancer Society, where he provided strategic and operational leadership through nearly 200 employees, 2000 volunteers and 12 offices in Manhattan, the Bronx, Brooklyn, Queens, Staten Island and Westchester County. He was a powerful voice in the successful campaign to ban smoking in most New York City restaurants and public places. He was also a strong advocate for improving the health of the city's youth, by promoting better quality food in the schools and by reducing the sale of junk food. In 2011, Batista was named a recipient of the "EL Award" -– a recognition given annually by El Diario La Prensa to the most outstanding men in New York's Latino community.

=== Jon May (2010–2010) ===
Jon May is CFO and partner at The CarbonNeutral Company Holdings, Inc., one of the world's leading carbon offset and carbon management businesses. May joined The CarbonNeutral Company from carbon management business, GreenLife in 2008. Before GreenLife, May was the co-founder and managing director of Catalytic Capital LLC, venture capital and private equity firm. Previously he had been senior vice president of corporate development for Triarc Companies, Inc., where he was responsible for merger identification and execution, corporate finance and planning. While at Triarc, he held the position of chief executive officer of Arby's, Inc. from 1999 to 2001, and remained chairman of Arby's from 2001 to 2004. While CEO of Arby's he had the opportunity to present charitable gifts at Big Brothers Big Sisters sites across the country. May has been a board member of BBBS of NYC since 1999 and was the acting executive director during 2010.

=== Michael A. Corriero (2008–2010) ===
In July 2008, The Honorable Michael Corriero took over as executive director. Corriero served the people of New York for three decades, beginning as an assistant district attorney for New York County in 1969.

He was appointed to New York State Supreme Court (1989–90) and also served as a judge of the Criminal Court of the City of New York (1980–89). He lectured on criminal justice as an adjunct professor at Pace University (1976–94) and was an assistant district attorney for New York County (1969–73). He subsequently specialized as a private practitioner in all phases of criminal law (1973–80). Judge Corriero was also assistant general counsel to the Society of European Songwriters, Authors and Composers; a legislative assistant; and an associate at Schiffmacher, Rochford & Cullen, a firm that specialized in municipal law.

=== Allan Luks (1990–2008) ===
For more than two decades, Luks led major nonprofit institutions, receiving significant national and international recognition. He worked with the Alcoholism Council of New York, followed by The Institute for the Advancement of Health—focusing on how the mind affects the body, including the benefits experienced by helping others. In 1990, Luks became the executive director for Big Brothers Big Sisters of New York City, the oldest and largest mentoring organization, a post he held for 18 years.

Currently, Luks is a senior advisor for BBBS of NYC and is a member of several boards of trustees for nonprofit organizations. He has published "Healing Power of doing Good," with Peggy Payne, on the "helper's high" obtained by helping others.
