= American Society of African Culture =

Former cultural organization

The American Society of African Culture (AMSAC) was an organization of African-American writers, artists, and scholars. The society was founded as a result of the Congress of Negro Writers and Artists in 1956 based on the idea of the French fr:Société africaine de culture.

In June 1957, the American Society of African Culture (AMSAC) was officially founded by five African-American intellectuals: the political scientist and civil rights activist John A. Davis, historian and social scientist Horace Mann Bond (1904–1972), professor of French and future American ambassador Will Mercer Cook (1903–1987), philosopher William T. Fontaine (1909–1968) and James Ivy, editor of the NAACP's Crisis. Thurgood Marshall and Duke Ellington were also founding fathers.

During its heyday in the early 1960s, AMSAC had around four hundred members. One of the main goals of the organisation was to expose African Americans to their African heritage. This aim was pursued through organising exhibitions, lectures, music performances, and conferences in the United States (primarily New York) and Africa (occasionally). AMSAC published the volumes Pan-Africanism Reconsidered and Southern Africa in Transition, edited versions of the papers and discussions of AMSAC-sponsored international conferences in, respectively, I960 and I963. Earlier, AMSAC edited and published in Presence Africaine, Africa Seen by American Negro Scholars . AMSAC also published a quarterly journal, African Forum, beginning in the summer of 1965 with themes such as African unity, African socialism, the writer (in recognition of the opening of the First World Festival of Negro Arts), the military in Africa, and South Africa and her neighbors.

== Office in Lagos, Nigeria ==
In 1961, AMSAC opened an African office in Lagos, Nigeria. The opening was celebrated with a two-day festival of music performances, dancing, panel discussions, and art exhibited by Africans and African Americans in December 1961. It closed in 1966.

== CIA funding ==
AMSAC had received federal tax exemption the year prior and thus large grants became available to the organization for specific projects from various entities. This financial backing was how they were able to organize the large festival in Lagos. The grants were later revealed as CIA pass-throughs.

After 1967, AMSAC's membership sharply declined after it was named as one of the organizations that was funded by the Central Intelligence Agency (CIA). AMSAC ceased to exist in 1969.

== See also ==
- Pan-Africanism
- Cultural diplomacy
- Congress for Cultural Freedom
