= Big Brothers Big Sisters of Northern Nevada =

American non-profit

Big Brothers Big Sisters of Northern Nevada is a non-profit organization whose vision is "that all children achieve success in life." Their mission is "to provide children facing adversity with strong and enduring, professionally supported 1-to-1 relationships that change their lives for the better, forever."

BBBSNN is an affiliate of the national youth mentoring organization Big Brothers Big Sisters of America. They aim "to create and support one-to-one mentoring relationships that ignite the power and promise of youth."

== Need ==
According to a study done by Civic Enterprises, Littles felt that drug and alcohol abuse was the biggest obstacle they faced when attempting to accomplish their goals.

From 2001 to 2005, the percentage of children in Washoe County living in poverty increased from 10.6% to 13.7%. In 2008, the poverty level in Washoe County was 12.2%, higher than the state rate. Nevada ranks 11th in the nation for the rate of teen pregnancy. Washoe County’s teen birth rate for ages 15–19 is 41.9 per 1,000.

In 2005, a study conducted by the nonprofit organization Join Together Northern Nevada reported 22% of middle school students admitted to using marijuana in the last 30 days.

In 2006, the crime rate in Washoe County, 291.2 per 100,000 youths ages 10 to 17, was higher than the state average of 203.6 per 100,000 youths. In September 2009, the Regional Gang Unit Report of Monthly Gang Activity for the Past Twelve Months reported that juveniles comprise 27% of active gang members and associates. In the 2008 through 2009 academic school year, over 2,000 youths were suspended or expelled from school in Washoe County for acts of violence. 113 of which were weapon related and 627 involved substance abuse.

The graduation rate in Washoe County 2010 was 63%. In 2008, Nevada had the highest dropout rate of 10% among teens. In 2008 and 2009, the dropout rate for the state of Nevada for grades 9-12 was 4.7%. Washoe County’s dropout rate was 3.0% In 2008, 11% of Washoe County high school students indicated they probably/definitely won’t complete a post high school program.

=== Cost to Washoe County ===
According to the Washoe County Sheriff’s Department, it costs a minimum of $46,000 per year to incarcerate an adult in Nevada.

The Washoe County Department of Juvenile Services receives over 8,800 youth offender referrals in one year. In a 2008–2009 budget report, department officials estimated that "it costs communities between $4.2 million to $7.2 million in damages related to a troubled youth not getting the help he or she needs."

A child who becomes a career criminal costs $3.2 million to $5.7 million, a heavy drug user costs more than $1 million and a high school drop out costs $675,000 to $1 million. It costs $222.67 per day to detain a youth in juvenile detention in Washoe County.

Matching a child with a mentor through Big Brothers Big Sisters for one year costs approximately $1,500 in Northern Nevada.

== Services ==
Community-Based mentoring: The volunteer Big Brother or Big Sister, also known as a "Big," gets together with the child, also known as a "Little" once a week, doing mostly free and low cost activities in the community together. They build a friendship in which the Big recognizes the potential of the Little and helps them succeed. It has been proven over time that the Little will raise their own expectations of themselves and continue to improve.

School-Based mentoring: Once a week, at a local school, the Big visits their Little. They have lunch together and share activities during recess. The child's connection to their school, attitude towards school and academic performance all improve as a result.

=== Eligibility for children to be "Littles" ===
Children ages 6 to 18 (or as young as 4 with an incarcerated parent), living in poverty and in a "fractured family" such as single-parent households or being raised by another relative, in foster-care or having a sibling involved in juvenile services.

=== Eligibility for volunteers to be "Bigs" ===
Mentors must have lived in the area for at least 6 months prior to volunteering as a "Big." They must be 18 years old or in their second semester of college to mentor for the School-Based program and 21 or older for the Community-Based program.

In 2009, almost 20% of the current volunteers for BBBSNN were college students. At the end of the June 2010 Fiscal year, that number grew to 39%. Bigs are asked to get together with their Littles once a week for at least 12 months. Bigs and Littles are annually encouraged to continue in their match for another 12 months.

== Effectiveness ==
Littles in the mentoring program are 46% less likely to use illegal drugs, 52% less likely to skip school and 33% less likely to be physically aggressive.

A nationwide survey found that BBBS mentoring has a "significant and positive impact on the lives of children."

Public Private Ventures did an impact study on Big Brothers Big Sisters in 2007 and found that at the end of the first year, Littles in the School-Based program saw an improvement in: quality of classwork, overall academic performance, number of assignments turned in and a decrease in school infractions.

According to the June 2010 Civic Enterprises report, Littles said having adult role models they can look up to was very important in helping them achieve their goals.

== History ==
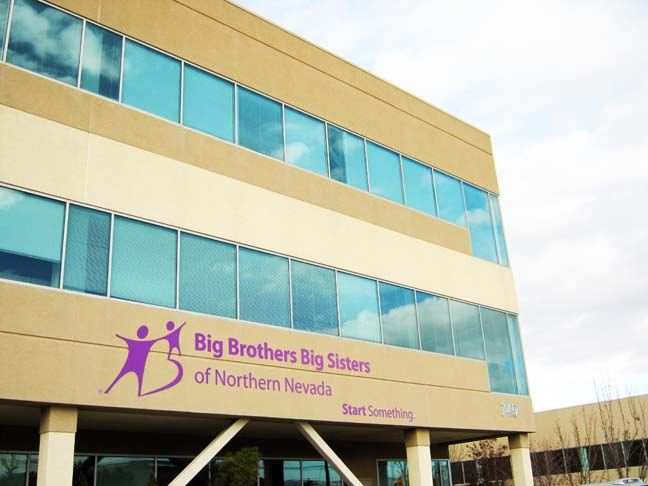
BBBSNN moved into this office building in 2010 on Moana Ln. from their previous residence on Apple St.

In January 2001, a local planning group composed of staff and volunteers from the Washoe County School District and Washoe County Department of Juvenile Services came together to begin planning for a BBSNN. The group approached Big Brothers Big Sisters of Southern Nevada with the idea of becoming one statewide organization. Washoe County Juvenile Services received approval by the local county commissioners and the US Office of Juvenile and Delinquency Prevention to pass through the last year of a federal "JUMP" grant to Big Brothers Big sisters as start up funds for the first year of operations.

The Northern Nevada office was founded in June 2001, initially as a branch of the Las Vegas-based Big Brothers Big Sisters of Nevada agency. In its first year, the Northern Nevada operation served 130 children by providing them with mentors. In 2004, the Northern Nevada branch incorporated and became a separate organization named Big Brothers Big Sisters of Northern Nevada. The advisory Board became the Board of Directors.

In 2006, a BBBSNN club was established at the University of Nevada, Reno to serve as peer support for college students who volunteer with Big Brothers and Big Sisters, as well as to assist in recruiting other students to become Bigs. In 2006, the donation center was opened. The Carson City office was opened in 2007 in order to serve children from the Carson City, Minden and Gardnerville areas. The first office was in rented space in a church. After a fire burned the church, the office was moved to the basement of the Children's Museum for two years. The current location is on Carson St. in a storefront location.

In March 2008, BBBSNN launched its '100 Good Men' volunteer recruitment campaign "to raise the visibility of the need for more men...to serve as Big Brothers." As part of the campaign, 12 billboards were put up around Reno with Mike Reed, then vice chancellor of the University of Nevada, who is also a Big Brother.

In 2010 BBBSNN launched a new marketing campaign called "Start Something" to replace the old campaign "Little Moments, Big Magic." The Reno office moved in August 2010 to Moana Lane and located a large sign with a call to action on the outside of the building using the agency's new tag line, "Start Something."

== Growth ==
Since being established in 2001, the local BBBSNN agency has seen an increase from 130 children served in 2001 to 956 children served in 2010.

== Special events ==
=== Grand Chef's Gala ===
The BBBS Grand Chef's Gala is an annual fundraiser that features top chefs who create special menus and cook tableside for small groups of guests. Each table has a chef. Each chef is paired with a special winery and each course is paired with a unique wine. There is a brief, live auction featuring special items up for bid to help raise funds, during the event.

=== Bowl for Kids' Sake ===
Bowl for Kids' Sake is an annual fundraising event that ends in a celebratory bowling party, with funds directed towards helping children have a successful future.

== Donation ==
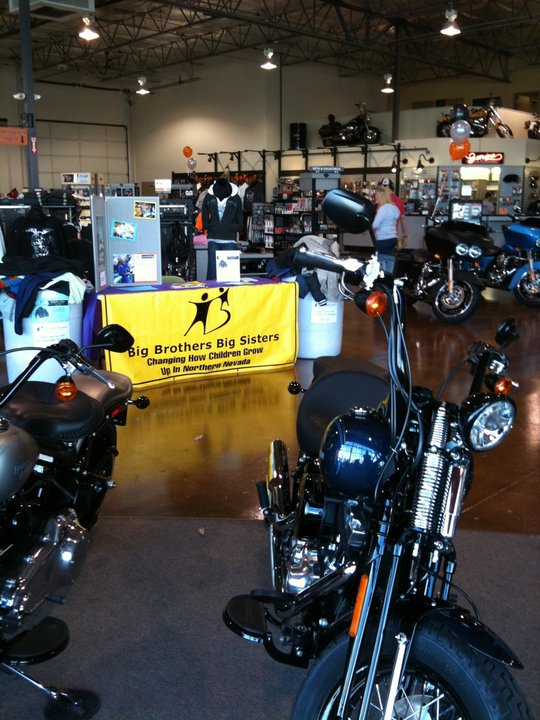
BBBSNN's 2010 coat drive at Reno Harley-Davidson

The BBBSNN donation center "gives residents the opportunity to recycle their clutter and reduce landfill accumulation by donating their used clothing and household items." There are 55 donation bins located throughout the Reno and Sparks area and they can be located via their website.

== Awards ==
In 2002, BBBSNN was awarded "Outstanding group performance for dedicated efforts in the field of Child Abuse & Neglect prevention & treatment" by CAN Prevention Task Force, Inc.

The Northern Nevada chapter was rated a top-3 finalist for mid-sized BBBS agencies in the United States in Sept. 2007 and was voted a finalist for best places to work in 2009.

In 2010, BBBSNN received the Ready for Life award.

== See also ==
- Big Brothers Big Sisters of New York City
