= Mary Dunlop Maclean =

Writer, journalist, and first managing editor (1873–1912)

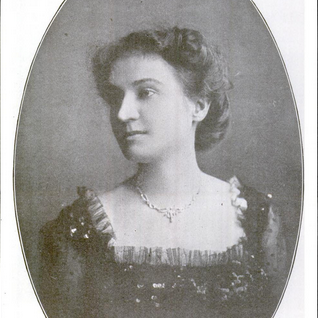
Mary Dunlop Maclean, from a 1912 publication.

Mary Dunlop Maclean (pseudonym, Judith Herz; September 27, 1873 – July 12, 1912) was a writer and journalist and the first managing editor of The Crisis from 1909 until her death.

== Early life ==
Mary Dunlop Johnson was born to white parents, Harriet Darling Johnson and Samuel Otis Johnson, in Nassau, Bahamas on September 27, 1873.

Her mother, who was a descendant of the Revolutionary War hero Paul Dudley Sargent and Governor John Winthrop, had been born in Maine, while her father had been born in Nassau to American parents.

Mary was sent to Boston, Massachusetts as a teenager to complete her education.

== Career ==
In 1907, Maclean edited a collection of Abraham Lincoln's letters and speeches. Soon after, Maclean volunteered as managing editor of The Crisis beginning in 1909, working with W. E. B. Du Bois as an editor, after the First National Negro Conference. She was the only woman on the magazine's initial six-person editorial board. She used her skills as a journalist to conduct interviews and report to the NAACP on a lynching in Coatesville, Pennsylvania.

Maclean worked simultaneously on the Sunday staff at the New York Times, writing features such as a report from Sicily after the 1908 Messina earthquake. She used the pseudonym "Judith Herz" for at least one article in The New Era (a profile of the Yiddish-language playwright, Jacob Gordin).

== Death and legacy ==
Maclean died, in 1912, from complications following surgery. She was 38 years old.

The staff of The Crisis established a memorial fund in her name, used to fund publications of the NAACP. Mary White Ovington chaired the memorial committee.
