= James W. Ivy =

James W. Ivy (1901 – 1974) was an African American educator and journalist. He edited the NAACP's magazine The Crisis from 1950 until retirement in 1966.

== Life ==
Ivy was born in Danville, Virginia on May 16, 1901, the son of William and Nannie Ivy. He was educated at public schools in Danville before gaining a B.Sc. from Virginia Union University in 1925. He later did graduate study at New York University.

In 1926 Ivy began teaching English and French at the all-black Union High School in Hampton, Virginia. He continued teaching at high schools in North Carolina and Virginia, and from 1934 to 1939 taught English at the Hampton Institute. Meanwhile, in 1930 he joined The Crisis as book review editor under W. E. B. Du Bois's' editorship. He continued working at the publication under Roy Wilkins as editor until 1942.

In 1944 he married Helen Marshall from Pittsburgh. They had no children. From 1945 to 1946 he was managing editor of the New York progressive monthly Common Sense. In 1946 he returned to The Crisis as assistant editor, and succeeded Wilkins as editor in 1950.

Ivy spoke several languages, and as Crisis editor was committed to coverage of the global black community. He later summarised his internationalist creed: "I believe American Negroes should recognise similarities between their problems and those of blacks in other parts of the world". Together with Horace Mann Bond, Mercer Cook, John A. Davis and William T. Fontaine, Ivy was amongst the African American delegates to the First Congress of Black Writers and Artists in Paris in 1956. The group, together with Thurgood Marshall and Duke Ellington, formed the American Society of African Culture in December 1956.

Ivy retired in May 1966. He died of cancer on April 11, 1974 at his home on La Salle Street, Morningside Heights, New York City.

== Writing ==
- 'Fifty years of progress in literature'. Pittsburgh Courier, 1950.
- 'The Wisdom of the Haitian Peasant: or some Haitian proverbs considered', Negro History Bulletin, Vol. 4, No. 9 (1951), pp. 197, 209-10.
- Present-day Brazilian Race Relations : a brief bibliography with an introduction. New York, 1958.
