= The Negro in Art =

1926 symposium

The Negro in Art: How Shall He Be Portrayed? was the title of a 1926 symposium hosted on the pages of The Crisis, the magazine of the National Association for the Advancement of Colored People (NAACP). Over seven issues, various figures in American literary culture answered seven questions posed by the editors. According to scholar A.B. Christa Schwarz, the symposium's articles are an enduring resource, with relevance to "attitudes toward the black−white literary marketplace on the crucial issue of representation."

== Background ==
The issue of the portrayal of African Americans in culture became an increasingly pressing one for the NAACP's leader, W. E. B. Du Bois, as what became known as the New Negro Movement (or Harlem Renaissance) began to take off. Black artists found it very difficult to overcome the predominance of racial stereotypes as they sought to portray the more vibrant black culture of the 20th century. Concerned with the direction cultural representation would take, Du Bois foresaw many issues arising.

== Description ==
The Crisis literary editor, Jesse Redmon Fauset, focused the discussion points and asked critic Carl Van Vechten to draft the final questionnaire. Seven questions were posed on the topics of artistic freedom, character choice, writer's responsibility, publisher's attitudes, misrepresentation (effects and responses), and influence. While broadly using the term 'art', the focus was specifically literature.

In addition to Fauset and Van Vechten, participants who responded included Charles W. Chesnutt, Georgia Douglas Johnson, Walter White, Countee Cullen and Langston Hughes. Also responding were Alfred A. Knopf, John C. Farrar, H. L. Mencken, Sherwood Anderson, Vachel Lindsay, Sinclair Lewis, DuBose Heyward, Julia Peterkin, and Joel Spingarn.

== Outcome ==
The white artists who responded to the questionnaire, led by Van Vechten, generally agreed that black artists should be allowed to choose any subject matter for their art without limitations. These respondents included Mencken, Lindsay, Heyward, and Peterkin. Black artists who responded to the questionnaire were "far less unified in their responses", some of them allowing for freedom of expression but agreeing with the implications of the seventh question: Is there not a real danger that young colored writers will be tempted to follow the popular trend in portraying Negro characters in the underworld rather than seeking to paint the truth about themselves and their own social class?

While the questions were aimed at fostering dialogue, the responses gravitated toward "rhetorical posturing", according to Kelley, who credits the diversity in responses to a larger debate being held in the Harlem Renaissance about "the responsibilities and freedoms of the African American artist and the proper roles of white critics and publishers".
