= The Crisis =

Official magazine of the NAACP

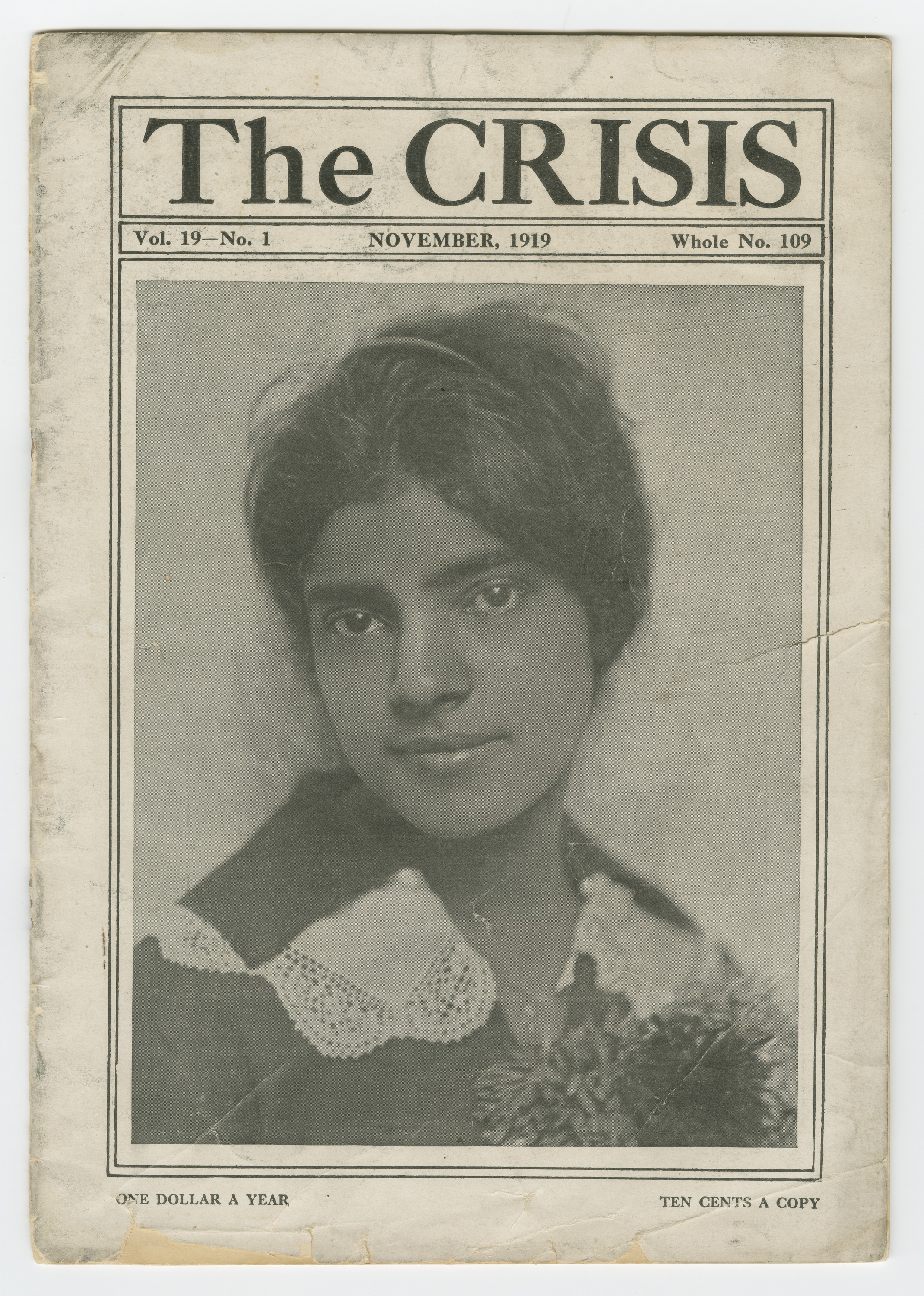
- The Crisis, Vol. 19, No. 1, November 1919
- Editor: Lottie Joiner
- Former editors: W. E. B. Du Bois, Roy Wilkins, James W. Ivy, Henry Lee Moon, Warren Marr II, Chester Higgins Sr., Maybelle Ward, Fred Beauford, Garland Thompson, Denise Crittendon, Gentry Trotter, Paul Ruffins, Ida E. Lewis, Phil Petrie, Victoria Valentine, Jabari Asim
- Frequency: Monthly
- Publisher: NAACP
- First issue: November 1910; 116 years ago
- Company: The Crisis Publishing Company
- Country: United States
- Based in: Baltimore, Maryland
- Language: English
- Website: www.thecrisismagazine.com
- ISSN: 1559-1573
- OCLC: 77079334

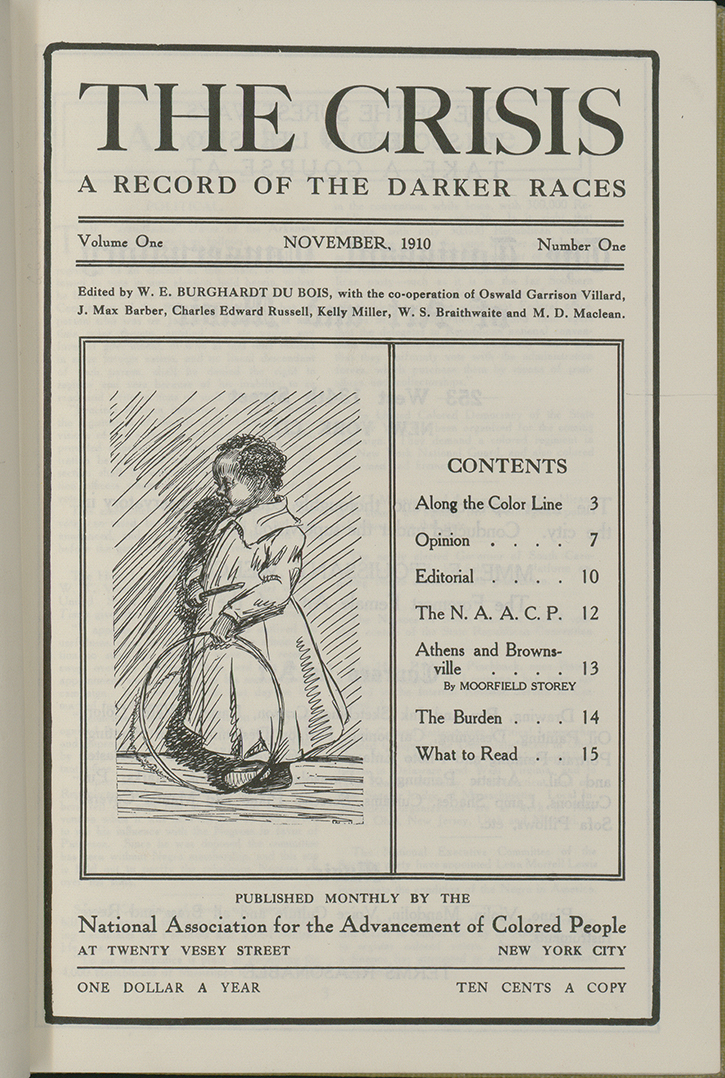
First issue, November 1910

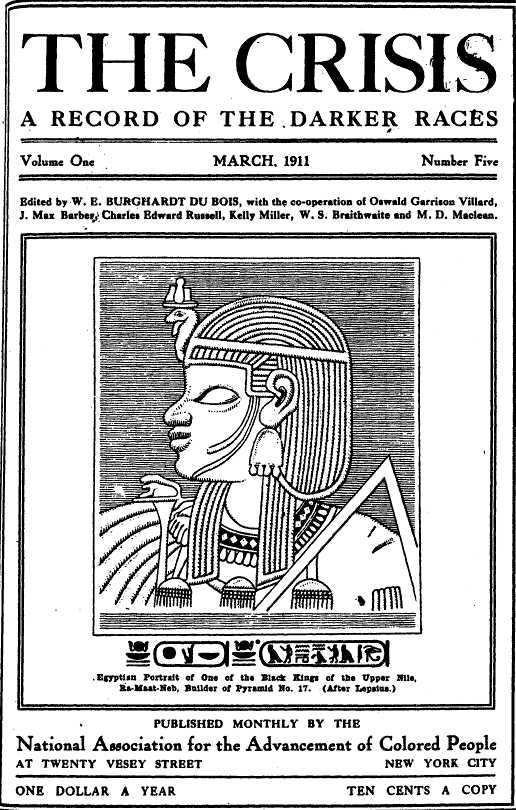
A 1911 copy of The Crisis depicting a copy of the relief of Nebmaatre I on Meroe pyramid 17

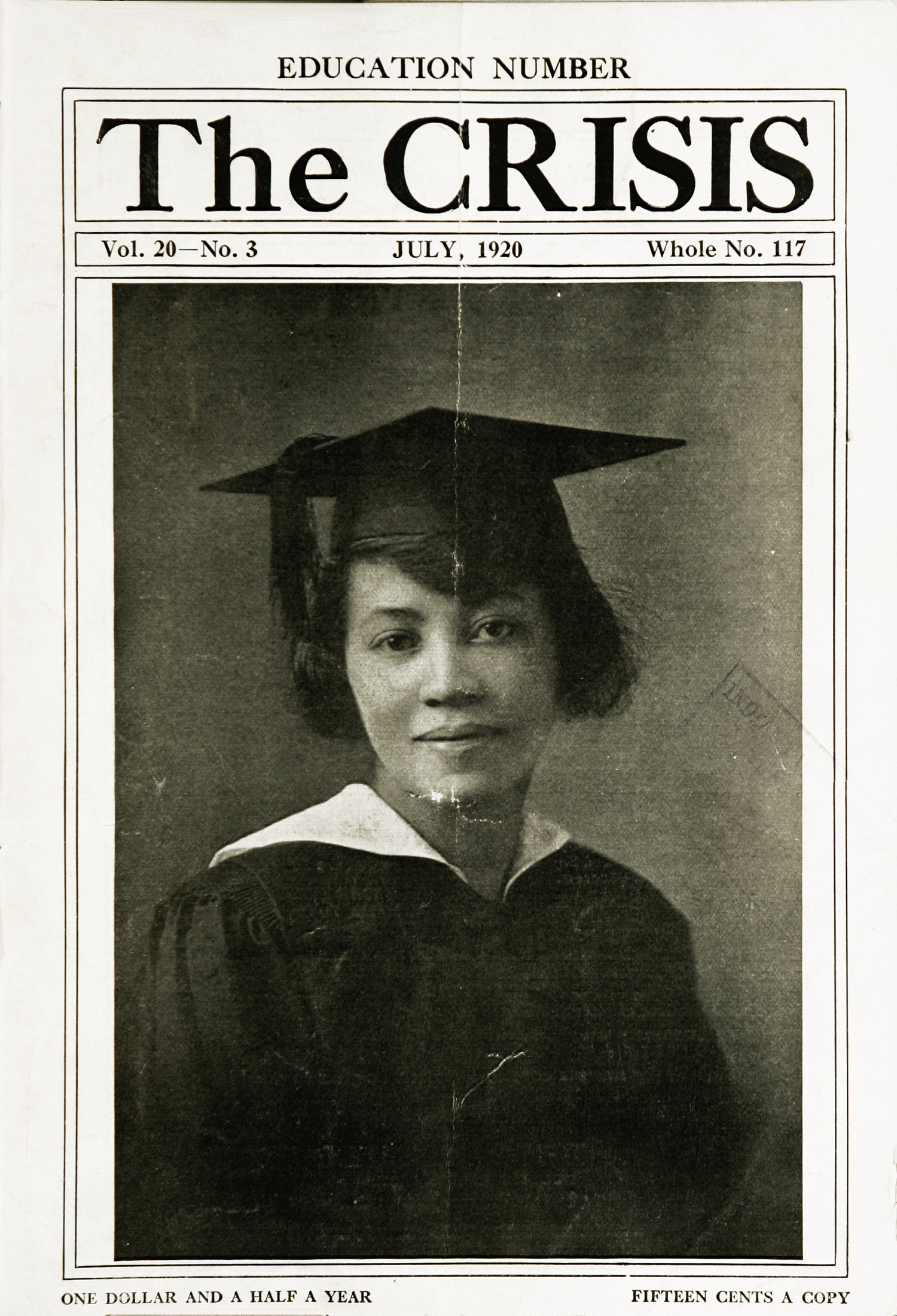
The August 1920 cover is a typical example of the annual education number under Du Bois's editorship.

The Crisis is the official magazine of the National Association for the Advancement of Colored People (NAACP). Founded in 1910 by W. E. B. Du Bois (editor), Oswald Garrison Villard, J. Max Barber, Charles Edward Russell, Kelly Miller, William Stanley Braithwaite, and Mary Dunlop Maclean, it has been in continuous print since then.

The Crisis is considered the oldest Black-oriented magazine in the world. Under Du Bois's editorship, it became an important forum for civil rights advocacy, political commentary, visual culture, and literary work associated with the Harlem Renaissance of the 1920s. Today, the magazine describes itself as "a quarterly journal of civil rights, history, politics and culture" that seeks to educate readers about issues affecting African Americans and other communities of color.

== History ==
=== The Du Bois era ===
==== Beginnings and the Du Bois era ====
The original title of the magazine was The CRISIS: A Record of The Darker Races. The magazine's name was inspired by James Russell Lowell's 1845 poem, "The Present Crisis". The suggestion to name the magazine after the poem came from one of the NAACP co-founders and noted white abolitionist Mary White Ovington. The first issue was typed and arranged by NAACP secretary Richetta Randolph Wallace.

As the founding editor of The Crisis, Du Bois proclaimed his intentions in his first editorial:

The object of this publication is to set forth those facts and arguments which show the danger of race prejudice, particularly as manifested today toward colored people. It takes its name from the fact that the editors believe that this is a critical time in the history of the advancement of men. ...Finally, its editorial page will stand for the rights of men, irrespective of color or race, for the highest ideals of American democracy, and for reasonable but earnest and persistent attempts to gain these rights and realize these ideals." (The Crisis, November 1910, 10)

Although The Crisis was officially an organ of the NAACP, Du Bois had a large degree of control over the periodical's expressed opinion. Du Bois wrote in Dusk of Dawn (1940) that he intended for The Crisis to represent his personal opinions:

I determine to make the opinion of the Crisis a personal opinion; because, as I argued, no organization can express definite and clear cut opinions... the Crisis would state openly the opinion of its editor, so long, of course, as that opinion was in general agreement with that of the organization.

==== Affiliation with the NAACP ====
The NAACP was founded in response to the Springfield Race Riots of Illinois in 1908, calling attention to the injustices that the black community was subjected to. After this riot, William Walling composed an article in the newspaper, prompting his audience to fight racism in a united fashion. Oswald Villard responded to Walling's article in one of his own titled "The Call", an article welcoming individuals to attend a national meeting dedicated to intersectional justice for all citizens despite race. There were 60 individuals that attended the call, seven of them were persons of color, including Mary Church Terrell, Ida B. Wells, and W. E. B. Du Bois. This meeting and signing of the call led to the formation of the NAACP in 1909.

The NAACP was largely recognized as a grassroots foundation, as it relied on the surrounding to community to sell subscriptions to the magazine, The Crisis. In its first year, the journal had a monthly circulation of 1,000. Ten years later, by 1918, it had more than 100,000 readers. It also grew in size, beginning at 20 pages and rising to as many as 68 pages; and in price, beginning at 10 cents per issue and later increasing to 15 cents. The Crisis would go on to become incredibly influential during the 1910s and 1920s and would take a large role in the Harlem Renaissance literature movement.

==== Literary and artistic impact during the Harlem Renaissance ====
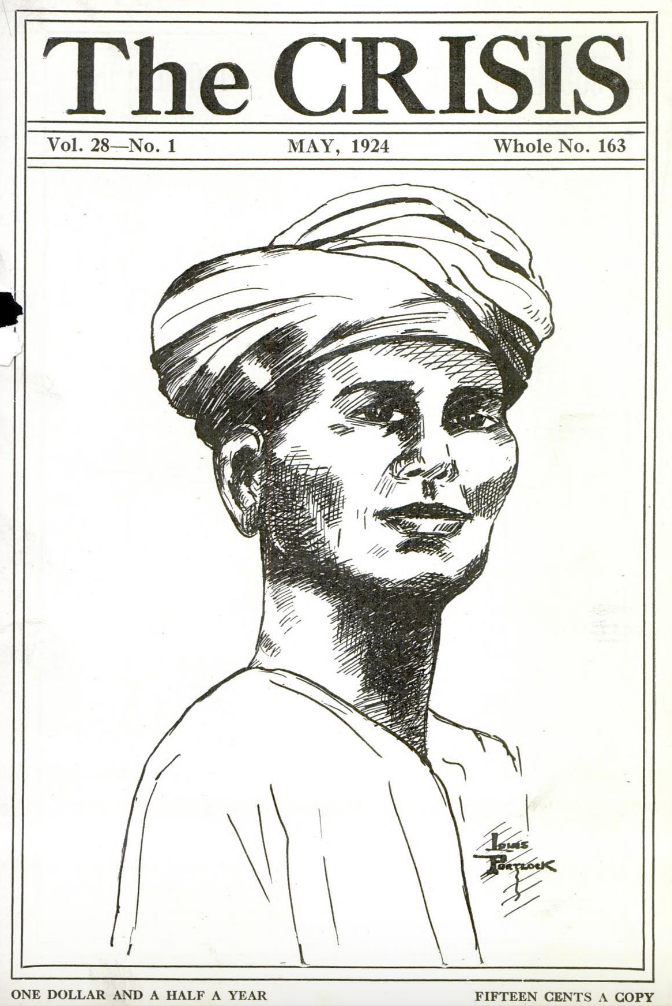
Cover of May 1924 issue

While the magazine was originally intended to be much more of a political and news publication than a literary publication, it had undeniable impact on the Harlem Renaissance literary and arts movement during the 1920s, especially from 1918 to 1926 when Jessie Redmon Fauset served as Literary Editor.

It was primarily during Jessie Fauset's tenure that literature abounded. Though not nearly as well-known today as Du Bois, Fauset's literary contributions were equal in importance. The poet Langston Hughes described Fauset as one of the "midwives of the Harlem Renaissance". Hughes wrote in his 1940 autobiography The Big Sea that the parties at Fauset's Harlem home were rather exclusive "literary soirees with much poetry but little to drink" (Hughes 244).

Some of the best-known writers of the Harlem Renaissance were first published or became well known by being published in The Crisis during Fauset's tenure, including Hughes, Countee Cullen, Arthur Huff Fauset (Jessie Fauset's younger half-brother), Jean Toomer, James Weldon Johnson, Claude McKay, Effie Lee Newsome, Zora Neale Hurston, Gwendolyn Bennett, Arna Bontemps, Charles Chesnutt, Marita Bonner, and Walter White. Despite Fauset's personal tastes and interests in her own writing, she featured poetry, prose, short stories, essays and plays in The Crisis. Fauset was also the primary force that kept the New York office going logistically between 1919 and 1926. Following her departure from The Crisis, the quality and quantity of the literature section of the magazine declined. In her biography of Fauset, Jessie Redmon Fauset, Black American Writer, Carolyn Wedin Sylvander writes that after Fauset's departure, several poets criticized Du Bois for neglecting literature, printing pieces the poets had specifically requested not be published, or printing old pieces.

In addition to literature, art played an important role in The Crisis's overall message and function. In his famous October 1926 essay "Criteria of Negro Art", which was delivered as an address at the Chicago conference of the NAACP in 1926, Du Bois stated one of his opinions on art:

Thus all art is propaganda and ever must be, despite the wailing of the purists. I stand in utter shamelessness and say that whatever art I have for writing has been used always for propaganda for gaining the right of black folk to love and enjoy. I do not care a damn for any art that is not used for propaganda. But I do care when propaganda is confined to one side while the other is stripped and silent.

This essay was published in conjunction with a seven-part series of responses to a symposium called The Negro in Art: How Shall He Be Portrayed?, which invited responses by black and white artists and intellectuals to seven questions on the freedoms and responsibilities of black artists.

In pursuing the use of art to positively portray the African-American race, Du Bois turned to photography as a favored medium. In Protest and Propaganda, Amy Helene Kirschke wrote: "Du Bois believed that art was in fact the embodiment of freedom of expression and that through art, truth could be expressed, creating something beautiful. Through the inclusion of art and poetry, creative writing, and photography, The Crisis could bring beauty into the home" (123). The arts were also used to capture current events. Political cartoons, illustrations and graphic photographs aligned with Du Bois' strong interest in social justice and in highlighting heinous crimes being committed against African Americans.

==== Educational impact under Du Bois ====
The Crisis magazine has played a major role in promoting the rise of African-American colleges and the rise of African-American studies. Early on, the magazine fostered an interest in higher education, reporting how the black universities were operating financially and administratively and on the hardships these colleges endured.

Children and education were two topics that mattered quite a bit to Du Bois, whose philosophy during that era was that a "Talented Tenth" of the African-American population should be bred, raised and trained to become elite intellectual and political leaders – a topic he first introduced in his 1903 book The Souls of Black Folk. Readers could see this reflected in the annual Children's and Education numbers, which came out in October and July, respectively, and which leaned heavily on photography as a medium for showing off the best of the best of African-American youth.

Fauset, who contributed articles to Crisis long before becoming the literary editor in 1918, also seemed to care deeply about children's literature, and contributed the large majority of content to The Brownies' Book, which was a monthly children's magazine that Du Bois, the Crisis business editor, Augustus Dill, and Fauset printed in 1920 and 1921. The Brownies' Book focused heavily on promoting standards of gender, class and racial behavior and pride, also using photographs to inspire young African-American children. Common themes in The Brownies' Book included doing well in school, taking pride in one's appearance, and learning about one's heritage, with many African folk tales and other African cultural issues mentioned.

Advertising also tended to focus heavily on education, with ads for various schools, institutions, training courses, and, of course, colleges and universities, featured in every issue during this time period, appearing before the table of contents in many cases.

==== Political impact under Du Bois ====
Du Bois used the magazine's opinion sections to advance his views on civil rights, racial violence, political leadership, labor, and Pan-Africanism. Common concerns in his writings included promoting a positive, dignified, progressive image of African-American people; calling for action, social justice and an end to violence against blacks. His editorials also engaged international questions, including Pan-Africanism, which scholar Brandon Kendhammer has described as central to Du Bois's broader anti-colonial political thought.

All of the issues between 1910 and 1934 feature an opinion section that was written by Du Bois (later renamed from "Opinion" to "Postscript"). Other Du Bois-authored columns included a "Men of the Month" column, which featured successful black men in various professions, a news column called "Along the Color Line", and a "Horizon" column, which read as more of a newsletter, detailing positive accomplishments by African Americans. Du Bois frequently included reviews of news articles from other publications that he felt were incorrect, and also tracked certain special causes. As an editor, Du Bois did not shy away from showing photographs of and writing about controversial issues, including lynching, racism in the U.S. military, labor issues, and political issues with as Booker T. Washington's views and Marcus Garvey's views.

The Crisis was also used to promote the production of black cinema. The center of their promotion was the Ethiopian Art Theatre, in Chicago. The theatre was a place that provided training and promotion of black actors as well as employment for black citizens of Chicago. It attracted thousands of blacks from the South, who saw it as evidence of success and pride within the black community.

However strongly Du Bois's opinions were expressed in the pages of The Crisis, he was certainly not the only contributor. During Fauset's tenure as literary editor, she wrote and edited a column entitled "The Looking Glass", which was primarily literature and art review, but also included other essays. The "Outer Pocket" column featured letters from readers. While Fauset's primary concern and duties were with the literature of the times, she shared other political outlooks with Du Bois, such as a concern for education and families. African cultural issues were also of concern to both Du Bois and Fauset in general, with their many trips overseas, their participation in several Pan-African Congresses and Conferences, and African-themed cover art and other art on the pages of The Crisis throughout the years.

=== After Du Bois ===
Du Bois's initial position as editor was in line with the NAACP's liberal program of social reform and racial equality, but by the 1930s Du Bois was advocating a form of black separatism. This led to disputes between Du Bois and the NAACP, resulting in his resignation as editor in 1934. He was replaced by Roy Wilkins. However, financial issues were also at play. In his 1940 memoir Dusk of Dawn, Du Bois wrote that the periodical suffered during the Great Depression as the "circulation dropped steadily until by 1933 it was scarcely more than ten thousand paid subscriptions."

While The Crisis has been published continually since 1910, its years under Du Bois are arguably far better-known than any of its other years. There have been 15 editors at the magazine's helm since Du Bois's departure. Roy Wilkins remained editor after Du Bois until 1949, when he became the acting NAACP secretary. James W. Ivy subsequently became the editor of the magazine until his retirement in 1966. The magazine continued to print news articles and opinion columns on current events and social concerns.

After Ivy's retirement, other persons who served as editor included Henry Lee Moon, Warren Marr II, Chester Arthur Higgins Sr. (1917–2000), Maybelle Ward, Fred Beauford, Garland Thompson, Denise Crittendon, Gentry Trotter, Paul Ruffins, Ida E. Lewis, Phil Petrie, and Victoria Valentine.

From 1997 to 2003, it appeared as The New Crisis: The Magazine of Opportunities and Ideas, but the title has since reverted to The Crisis.

On August 7, 2007, Jabari Asim was named editor of The Crisis by then publisher Roger Wilkins. Asim came to The Crisis from The Washington Post, where he was Book World deputy editor.

The Chicago Tribune named The Crisis one of its "50 Favorite Magazines" in 2008, stating: "This venerable publication of the National Association for the Advancement of Colored People has continued to evolve and illuminate since its premiere issue in November 1910 (one year after the creation of the NAACP)."^{[11]}

== Advertisement ==
The magazine carried advertisements for jobs, schools, books, businesses, cultural events, and services aimed at African-American readers. During Du Bois's editorship, educational institutions and publications were especially prominent among its advertisers. Some of the schools advertised are Howard University, Fisk University, Paine College, The Cheyney Training School for Teachers and many others. The number one thing these schools had in common was they were all only for colored students. Another popular advertisement under Du Bois was job advertisements. Some of the jobs advertised were teachers, vendors, nurses, dentists, civil service and stenographers. There was always a need for advertising agents. The Crisis even had its own ad for agents specifically for the magazine. The advertisement section also includes ads for other magazines and books to read. One of these magazines is The Brownies' Book, a magazine for children; a double subscription to The Brownies' Book and The Crisis for a special price is even offered. Another was Locoma Magazine, an adult magazine featuring such topics as marriage, divorce, eugenics, and birth control. The Crisis also advertised books that claimed to be necessary reading for all African Americans; among these books were Darkwater: Voices from Within the Veil by Du Bois, Scott's Official History of the American Negro in the Great War by Emmett Jay Scott, and As Nature Leads by J. A. Rogers. As the magazine continued its growth and influence, they added a table of books readers could buy from the magazine, which was called "The Crisis Book Mart". This range of books featured influential writers including Langston Hughes, Alain Locke, Claude McKay and others. Many of the books and magazines advertised in The Crisis are aimed to showcase culture as well as to educate African Americans. Real estate was also included in the magazine's advertisements, as well as plots of land for building homes and even for vacationing in various locations such as Orchardville, Idlewood, Pleasantville, and Atlantic City. This showed the spread of African Americans across different cities, as well as their prospering wealth.

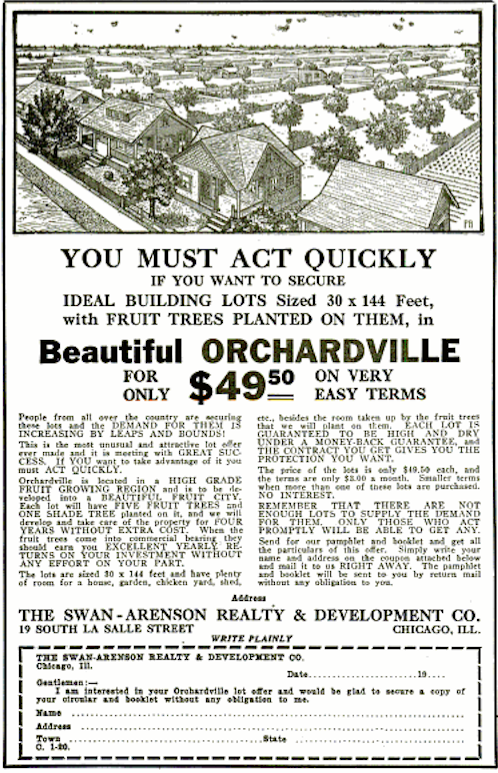
A 1920 advertisement in The Crisis for a plot of land

Other types of advertisements in The Crisis promoted music as well as vocalists and musicians. Some of those promoted were lyric soprano Cleota Collins, concert violinist Wesley I. Howard, and high-class entertainers Invincible Concert Co. There were also advertisements for phonograph records as well as hymn books, and plays.

Other advertisements of The Crisis magazine covered a variety of topics: a Booker T Washington bust, colored dolls, hair grower/preparation (Madam C. J. Walker's preparations for the hair/ Nile Queen), wigs (fashion book), tooth polish (Dr. Welters antiseptic tooth powder), tuxedos, NAACP membership, Christmas Seals (for the NAACP/ protecting against tuberculosis), "On Health's Highway" to support cancer patients, laundry, Negro art photo calendar, undertaking and embalming, life health and accident insurance. Many of these advertisements showed the push for African Americans, women especially, to focus on their looks. One such advertisement even stated: "It is the duty of human beings to be attractive."

== Editors ==
- 1910–1934: W. E. B. Du Bois
- 1919-1926: Jessie Redmon Fauset (Literary Editor)
- 1934–1949: Roy Wilkins
- 1949–1966: James W. Ivy
- 1967–1974: Henry Lee Moon
- 1974–1980: Warren Marr II
- 1981–1984: Chester Higgins Sr.
- 1984–1985: Maybelle Ward
- 1985–1992: Fred Beauford; 1991–1998: Walter Morrison, Associate Editor
- 1992–1994: Garland Thomas
- 1994: Denise Crittendon
- 1995–1997: Eric Clark, Managing Editor; Tsitsi Wakhisi, Contributing Editor
- 1997–1998: Paul Ruffins
- 1998–2000: Ida E. Lewis
- 2001 and 2007: Phil Petrie (interim)
- 2001–2007: Victoria Valentine
- 2007–2017: Jabari Asim
- 2017–: Lottie Joiner

== See also ==
- Opportunity: A Journal of Negro Life
- Phylon
