= Ida E. Lewis =

American journalist (born 1934)

Ida Elizabeth Lewis (born September 22, 1934) is a Black American journalist and teacher. She was editor-in-chief of the magazines Essence and The Crisis, and founder of Encore.

== Career ==
Lewis began her career in 1957 as a reporter for the Amsterdam News and then for The New York Age. From 1963 to 1969 she lived in Paris, where she wrote for Le Monde, Le Figaro Magazine, Life and Jeune Afrique. She conducted interviews for the BBC. Her first essay collection, The Deep Ditch and The Narrow Pit, was published in 1964. She moved back to the US in 1969, where she was a correspondent for Jeune Afrique. In 1970 she was named editor-in-chief of Essence magazine, but she left the next year to start Encore. She was the first black woman to launch a national publication.

In 1979, Lewis joined the faculty of Columbia University's Graduate School of Journalism. During the 1980s she worked as a political consultant and press agent; her clients included Ross Perot, Abraham Hirschfeld and Adam Clayton Powell IV. In 1998 Lewis became editor-in-chief of the NAACP's The Crisis magazine.

She was an adjunct professor of journalism at Boston University College of Communication and was a member of the Dean's Executive Advisory Board, the Alumni Council, and the College of Communication's National Alumni Committee. She established the Ida E. Lewis Scholarship Fund to support minority students in journalism.

== Awards and recognition ==
Lewis received the Award for Excellence in Journalism from the Association for the Study of African American Life and History, and the Woman of Distinction Award from Kingsborough Community College at the City University of New York.
