= Clifford W. Beers =

American mental health advocate (1876–1943)

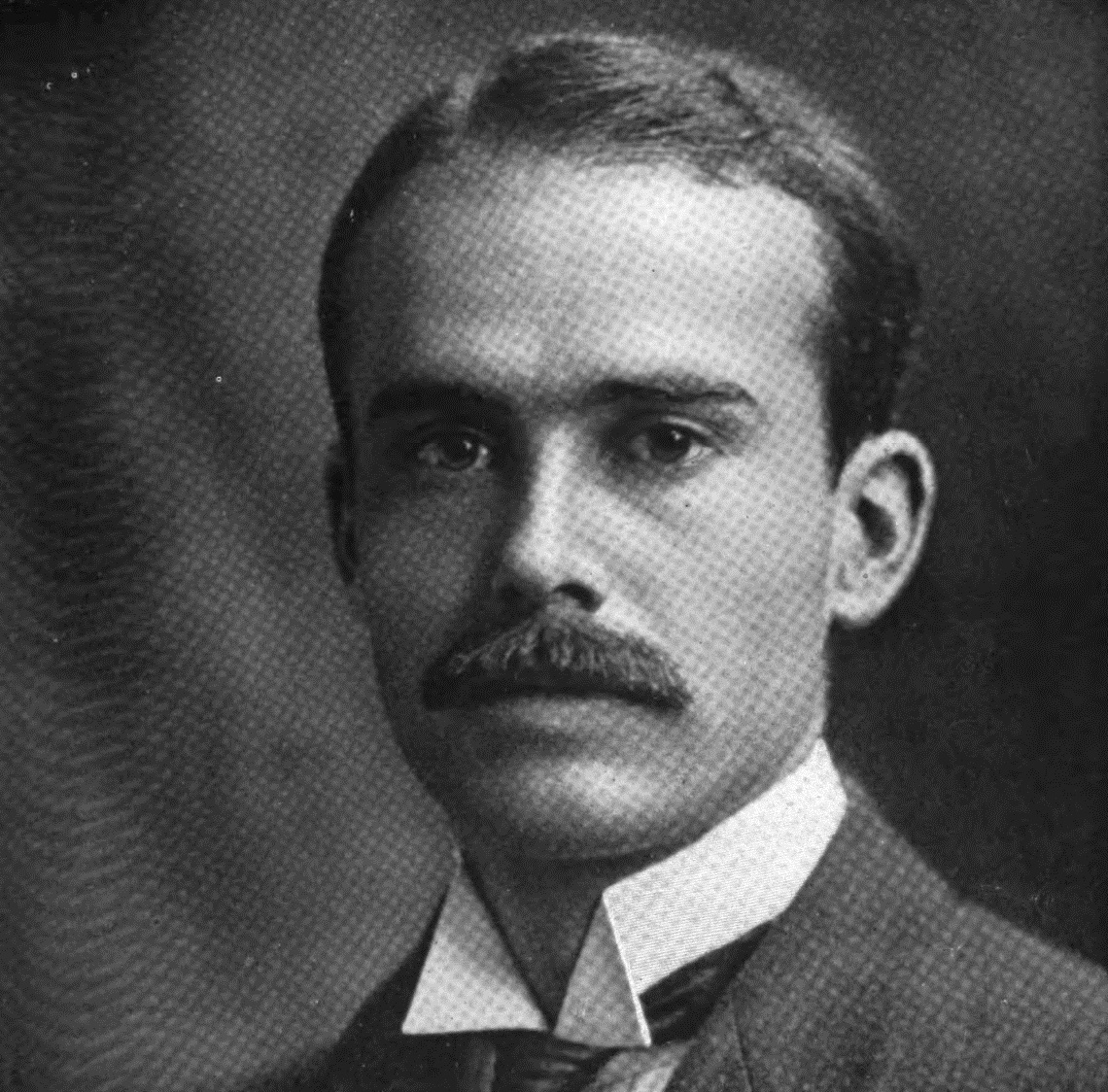
- Beers, c. 1912
- Born: Clifford Whittingham Beers; March 30, 1876; New Haven, Connecticut, U.S.
- Died: July 9, 1943 (aged 67); Providence, Rhode Island, U.S.
- Education: Yale University
- Occupations: Founder of the "National Committee for Mental Hygiene" (1909); Founder of New Haven's Clifford Beers Clinic (1913), the first outpatient mental health clinic in the United States
- Known for: Founder of the American Mental Health Movement; Author of A Mind That Found Itself (1908)
- Spouse: Clara Jepson (m. 1912)
- Parent(s): Robert Anthony Beers; Ida (Cooke) Beers
- Honors: Honorary President of the World Federation for Mental Health; Chevalier Legion d'Honneur (1933)

Signature
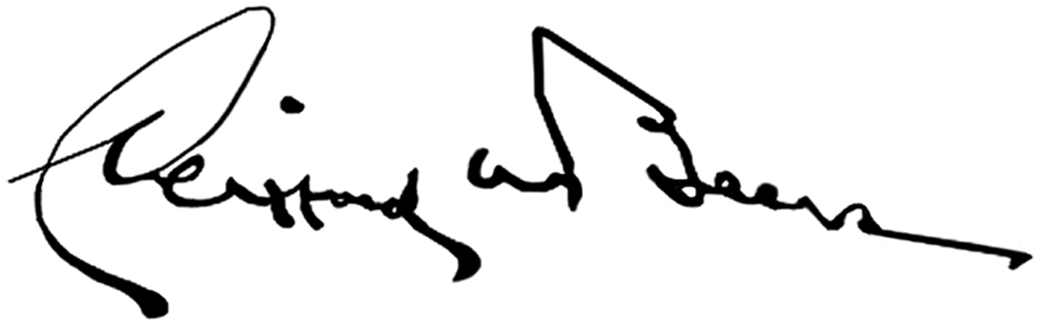

Clifford Whittingham Beers (March 30, 1876 – July 9, 1943) was an American author and psychiatric patient, best known as the founder of the American mental hygiene movement.

== Biography ==
Beers was born in New Haven on March 30, 1876. He was one of five children, all of whom suffered from psychological distress and spent time in mental institutions, including Beers himself. He graduated from the Sheffield Scientific School at Yale in 1897, where he was business manager of The Yale Record and a member of Berzelius.

In 1900 he was first confined to a private mental institution for depression and paranoia. He would later be confined to another private hospital as well as a state institution. During these periods he experienced and witnessed serious maltreatment at the hands of the staff. His book A Mind That Found Itself (1908), an autobiographical account of his hospitalization and the abuses he suffered, was widely and favorably reviewed, became a bestseller, and is still in print.

Beers gained the support of the medical profession and others in the work to reform the treatment of the mentally ill. In 1908 Beers founded the "Connecticut Society for Mental Hygiene", now named Mental Health Connecticut. In 1909 Beers founded the "National Committee for Mental Hygiene", renamed "National Mental Health Association", now named "Mental Health America", in order to continue the reform for the treatment of the mentally ill. On June 26, 1912, Beers married his childhood friend and confidant Clara Jepson. The couple had no children.

He also started the Clifford Beers Clinic in New Haven in 1913, the first outpatient mental health clinic in the United States.

Beers became Honorary President of the World Federation for Mental Health.

Beers was a leader in the field until his retirement in 1939. He died at Butler Hospital in Providence, Rhode Island, on July 9, 1943.

The Extra Mile in Washington, D.C., selected Beers as one of its 37 honorees. The Extra Mile pays homage to Americans like Beers who set their own self-interest aside to help others and successfully brought positive social change to the United States.
