= Artis Stevens =

American businessman

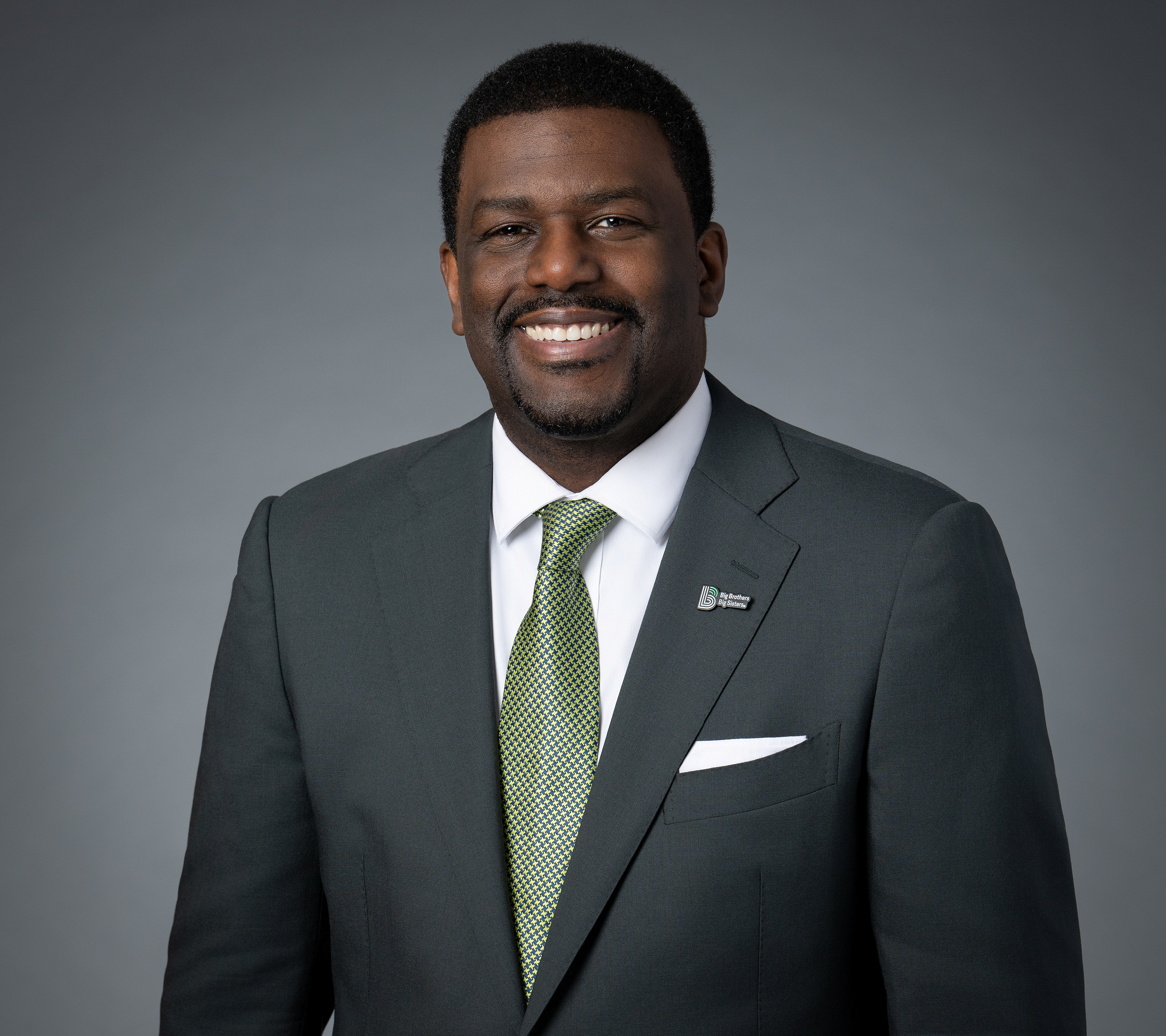
- Born: Jacksonville, Florida
- Education: University of Georgia; Valdosta State University (MPA)
- Occupations: President and CEO of Big Brothers Big Sisters of America

Artis Stevens is an American executive and the president and CEO of Big Brothers Big Sisters of America. Prior to that, he was senior vice president and chief marketing officer at the National 4-H Council.

== Education and early life ==
Stevens was born in Jacksonville, Florida, and grew up in Brunswick, Georgia. He is the son and grandson of pastors and the youngest child of a large family. He attended the University of Georgia, where he joined the Alpha Phi Alpha fraternity and became the first in his family to graduate college. He earned a Master of Public Administration degree in marketing at Valdosta State University.

== Career ==
=== Early career ===
Stevens began his career in his hometown at the Brunswick Housing Authority; he then worked for the Atlanta Public Housing Agency. At Boys & Girls Clubs of America (BGCA), he was national vice president for marketing, strategy, and operations. While at BGCA, he led the launch of the Great Futures Start Here campaign and tagline. In 2014, he became senior vice president and chief marketing officer at the National 4-H Council. During his time there, he helped grow the organization's fundraising streams and brand visibility.

=== Big Brothers Big Sisters of America ===
Big Brothers Big Sisters of America (BBBSA) named Stevens as its president and CEO in November 2020, after then-CEO Pam Iorio announced her retirement. He officially assumed the role in January 2021, becoming the organization's first Black CEO.

During his tenure, the organization expanded its group mentoring and workplace mentoring programs. The expansion was partially funded by a $122.6 million donation from MacKenzie Scott, the largest gift from an individual donor in BBBSA's history. With a priority on volunteer recruitment, Stevens spearheaded the Game Changers initiative and formalized partnerships with Alpha Phi Alpha and Lambda Theta Phi to increase mentor registration. By 2025, his efforts reduced the waitlist for mentors by one third and reversed a 10-year trend of declining membership.

== Personal life ==
Stevens is married and has two daughters. He is based in Atlanta.

== Recognition ==
In 2018, while Stevens was working at 4-H, the American Marketing Association named him Nonprofit Marketer of the Year. Valdosta State University named Stevens a distinguished alumnus in 2023. In December 2024, Forbes included Stevens in the ForbesBLK 50 list of influential Black Americans. Stevens was featured in the inaugural Time 100 list of the most influential leaders in philanthropy in 2025.
