= Ethel Percy Andrus =

American educator who founded AARP (1884–1967)

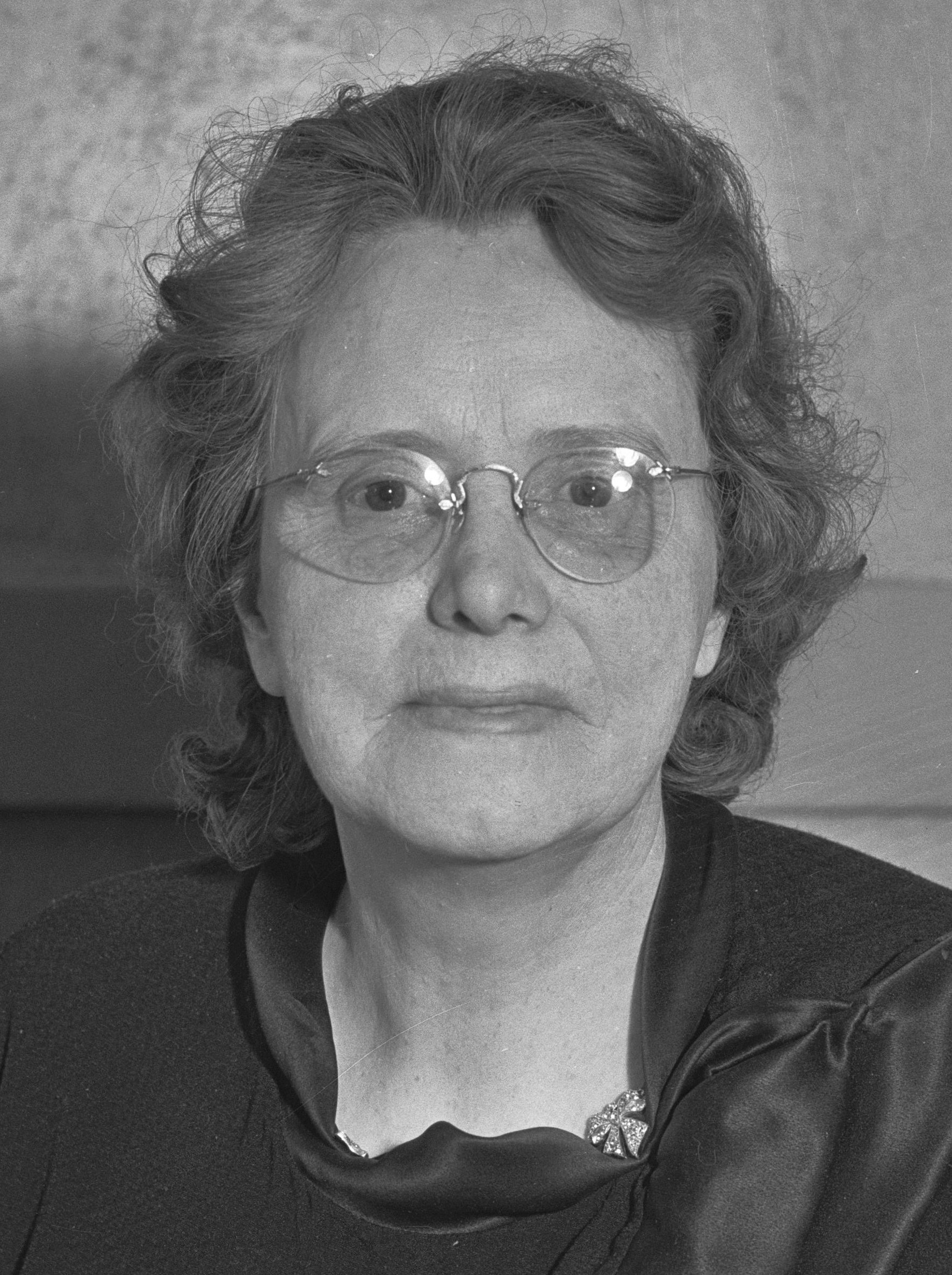
- Andrus in 1936
- Born: September 21, 1884; San Francisco, California, U.S.
- Died: July 13, 1967 (aged 82); Long Beach, California, U.S.
- Education: University of Chicago; Lewis Institute; University of Southern California
- Occupation: Educator
- Known for: First woman high school principal in California; founder of AARP

Ethel Percy Andrus (September 21, 1884 – July 13, 1967) was a long-time educator and the first female high school principal in California. She was also an elder rights activist and the founder of AARP in 1958.

In 1993, she was inducted into the National Women's Hall of Fame. In 1995, she was designated a Women's History Month Honoree by the National Women's History Project.

== Early life and education ==
Andrus earned a Bachelor of Philosophy degree from the University of Chicago in 1903 and a Bachelor of Science degree from Lewis Institute, now Illinois Institute of Technology, in 1918. She then went on to receive her master's and doctoral degrees from the University of Southern California in 1928 and 1930, respectively.

== Career ==
While teaching at the Lewis Institute, she volunteered at Jane Addams' Hull House.

Andrus founded a separate organization, the National Retired Teachers Association (NRTA) in 1947. She realized that retired teachers were living on very small pensions, often without any health insurance. She approached more than 30 companies to offer health insurance to retired teachers before she found someone willing to take a chance on NRTA members in 1956. The organization expanded its membership to all retirees and became AARP in 1958.

In 1954, she moved to Ojai, California, to start Grey Gables of Ojai, an NRTA sponsored retirement community. She ran both NRTA and AARP from her offices in Ojai until 1964 when she moved the administrative branch of AARP to Long Beach. It was while living in Ojai that she founded AARP in 1958. Today, the NRTA is still a division of AARP and serves as its educator community.

== Death and legacy ==
Andrus died July 13, 1967, in Long Beach, California, and is buried at Ivy Lawn Memorial Park in Ventura, California.

The Ethel Percy Andrus Gerontology Center is named after her at the University of Southern California Leonard Davis School of Gerontology, the oldest and largest existing professional school of gerontology.

Among Andrus' many accomplishments is a stint as a faculty member at Chicago's Lewis Institute, a predecessor of Illinois Institute of Technology, and being the first woman principal of a major urban high school in the state of California at Abraham Lincoln High School in Los Angeles. She was inducted into the National Women's Hall of Fame in 1993. The Extra Mile National Monument in Washington, D.C., selected Andrus as one of its 37 honorees. The Extra Mile pays homage to Americans like Andrus who set their own self-interest aside to help others and successfully brought positive social change to the United States.
