= Mollie Moon =

American founder and civil rights fundraiser (1912–1990)

- Mollie Moon, 1956 by Carl Van Vechten
- Born: Mollie Lewis; July 21, 1907; Cleveland, Ohio
- Died: June 22, 1990 (aged 82); New York, New York
- Education: Meharry Medical College
- Spouse: Henry Lee Moon (m. 1938)

Mollie Moon (July 21, 1912 – June 22, 1990) was the founder and president of the National Urban League Guild, the fundraising branch of the National Urban League. She served as president of the Guild for almost 50 years, from its founding until her death.

== Early life ==
Moon was born Mollie Lewis in Cleveland, Ohio on July 21, 1907. Her parents were Telious and Beulah (Rogers) Lewis. She studied pharmacy at Meharry Medical College. She also studied in the Teachers College of Columbia University, as well as the New School for Social Research and the University of Berlin. She was a member of Alpha Kappa Alpha sorority.

== Career ==
=== Early career ===
Moon worked as a pharmacist in several states, before moving to New York City to work as a social worker for the Department of Social Services.

=== National Urban League Guild ===
Moon served as secretary to the board of trustees of the National Urban League. She founded the National Urban League Guild in 1942 in order to raise funds in support of the League's racial equality programs. Lester B. Granger, then director of the Urban League, challenged Moon personally to help the league become 'financially stable.' At first an informal group, it eventually developed bylaws and held elections, with Moon serving as president until her death 1990.

The Guild's most well-known fundraising event was its annual Beaux Arts Ball, a charity gala with a different theme each year. The Ball was held in various locations in New York City, starting in the Savoy Ballroom, moving to Rockefeller Center in 1948, and then to the Waldorf Astoria in 1960. Winthrop Rockefeller, also a board member of the National Urban League, signed the invitations to the 1948 event along with Moon, when the move to Rockefeller Center proved controversial.

=== Later career ===
Moon served on the national advisory council for Department of Health, Education, and Welfare's Food and Drug Committee from 1972 to 1976. Moon received recognition for her decades of service to the Guild in later life, receiving both the Equal Opportunity Award from the National Urban League and the President's Volunteer Action Award from President George H. W. Bush. She also founded the Henry Lee Moon Civil Rights Library, housed in the National Association for the Advancement of Colored People's headquarters in Baltimore, which is named after her husband. Moon was also known to have been active with the Catholic Interracial Council.

== Personal life and death ==
In 1938, she married Henry Lee Moon, who became the public relations director of the National Association for the Advancement of Colored People.

Moon died of a heart attack on June 22, 1990, at her home in Long Island City, Queens, New York. Her funeral was held at the Church of Saint Ignatius Loyola in Manhattan.
