= Richetta Randolph Wallace =

American administrator

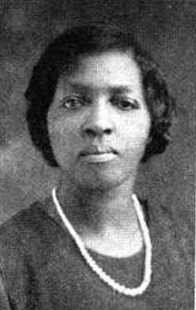
- Richetta Randolph Wallace, from a 1923 publication.
- Born: Richetta G. Randolph; May 12, 1884; Chesterfield County, Virginia
- Died: March 1, 1974 (aged 89); Brooklyn, New York
- Occupations: secretary, administrator
- Years active: 1905-1950s
- Known for: longtime staff member at the NAACP

Richetta Randolph Wallace (May 12, 1884 – March 1, 1974) was an American administrator, and the first staff member hired by the NAACP.

== Early life ==
Richetta G. Randolph was born in Chesterfield County, Virginia, and raised in Plainfield, New Jersey, the daughter of Richard E. Randolph and Martha Jane Chapman Randolph. Her father was choirmaster at Fillmore Avenue Baptist Church in Bridgewater Township, New Jersey. She attended Gaffey's Business School in New York City. She was related to labor leader A. Philip Randolph, but their specific relationship is unclear.

== Career ==
Richetta Randolph began working for white suffragist and journalist Mary White Ovington in 1905, as her private secretary. In 1912, she became the first member of the administrative staff at the NAACP. She was the organization's office manager; "it was her machine that in 1909 typed the original 'Call' to organize the N. A. A. C. P.", recalled Ovington, of Randolph's involvement. "More than anyone else, she knows the history of the Association and we turn to her with questions of the past as well as the present." She served as clerk of the annual NAACP conferences, and served as personal secretary of James Weldon Johnson and Walter Francis White. She "arranged and typed" the first issue of The Crisis, and corresponded with W. E. B. Du Bois. "It would have been difficult to have secured a more efficient person to do the exacting clerical work of the young N. A. A. C. P.", commented George Schuyler in a 1942 profile. She worked for the NAACP for over thirty years, until her retirement in 1946.

Before and during retirement, Randolph Wallace worked for the Rev. O. Clay Maxwell, pastor of the Mt. Olivet Baptist Church in Harlem. She was the first woman to serve on the church's board of trustees. She performed in a 1928 church pageant, and wrote a historical pageant, "Mount Olivet Yesterday and Today" (1953), about the church's founding.

== Personal life ==
Richetta G. Randolph married Frank E. Wallace in 1914, and was widowed when he died in 1921. She died in 1974, in Bedford–Stuyvesant, Brooklyn, where she had lived since 1933. Her papers are archived in the Brooklyn Historical Society.
