= Attack on John Shillady =

Mob attack in 1919

John Shillady

Executive Secretary of the NAACP
- In office 1918–1920
- Preceded by: James Weldon Johnson
- Succeeded by: James Weldon Johnson

Personal details
- Born: John Rhode Shillady; November 1, 1875 County Down, Ireland, UK
- Died: September 6, 1943 (aged 67) Ogdensburg, New York, U.S.

Attack on John Shillady
- Part of Red Summer
- Date: April 21, 1919
- Location: Austin, Texas
- Participants: Mob of 8 to 10 white men, including county judge David Pickle, constable Charles Hamby, and Ben Pierce
- Injuries: John Shillady

John Rhode Shillady (1875-1943) was an Irish-American political activist who was Executive Secretary of the National Association for the Advancement of Colored People (NAACP) from 1918 to 1920. He was attacked and badly beaten by a mob in Austin, Texas, on August 22, 1919. The attack occurred in broad daylight in downtown Austin, and the perpetrators bragged publicly about it. Shillady's injuries left long-lasting physical and emotional effects.

== Background ==
Shillady went to Texas, which was the fastest-growing state branch of the NAACP, after the Texas Attorney General said that the NAACP had no state charter and could not operate in Texas. He also said that the group's opposition to segregation violated state law.

Shillady arrived by train late on August 20. The next day, after meeting with various officials, he was confronted by a mob of 8 to 10 white men, including county judge David Pickle, constable Charles Hamby, and Ben Pierce. They served him with a subpoena, and hauled him to a secret "court of inquiry", "for discovering the object of his visit." The judge was M. M. Johnson. "The proceedings were dignified by such questions as: 'If you're a "nigger" lover why don't you go and stay in a "nigger" hotel?', and similar questions concerning the witness and his family." "Effort was made to show that the National Association was attempting to violate the laws of Texas by…favoring equal and unsegregated accommodations on railroad cars." While Shillady "read into the record" information about the Association and the National Conference on Lynching, this record has never been found. Pickens berated him and demanded that he leave Texas immediately, which he refused to do.

== The attack ==
The next day, he noted he was being shadowed. At 10 AM, outside the Driskill Hotel where he was staying, the group confronted him again. When Shillady said "You don't see my point of view," constable Hanly "struck him squarely in the right eye and said 'I'll fix you so you can't see'". (Hanly's hand was subsequently bandaged; some reports say it was Pickle who punched him.) The others joined in, and he was "severely beaten"; in addition to a black eye, he was bleeding from the head, and his body as well as his face was "badly bruised." After a doctor stitched his face, the mayor of Austin sent a police officer as escort, at Shillady's request, and he and his attackers accompanied him to the train station and remained until he got on the next train north, to St. Louis. He was warned not to get off the train in Texas. Visits to him in the Waco and Dallas stations verified that he did not leave the train.

== Afterwards ==
Judge Pickle bragged about his participation. The names of all three appeared later the same day in a front-page article in the Austin Statesman. Pickle made a statement to a reporter:

Shillady was warned by several persons in the county that his agitation didn't sit well with the people of the neighborhood and that it would be wise for him to desist.
When we heard of his going downtown…we decided to go down, meet him, and as private citizens and not in our official capacity, to give him a good thrashing on general principles.
Shillady was advocating the doing away of all Jim Crow laws, the establishment of racial equality as far as use of hotels, restaurants, theaters, passenger trains, pullman sleepers and similar stuff.

In response to an inquiry by Mary White Ovington, chairman of the Board of the NAACP, Deputy Sheriff Gene Barbisch replied:

Your secretary, John R. Shilladay, reached Austin and was received by red blooded white men.
As we did need any of his kind (negro-loving white men) we have sent him back home to you.
We attend to our own affairs down here, and suggest that you do the same up there.

"Governor William P. Hobby blamed Shillady"; he was quoted in the press saying "I believe in sending any narrow-brained, double-chinned reformer who comes here with the end in view of stirring up racial discontent back to the North where he came from, with a broken jaw if necessary."

The NAACP published a 12-page pamphlet on the "mobbing".

In addition to the physical injuries, he was "emotionally crushed". "Broken in spirit", the year afterwards he resigned his NAACP post.
