= William Fontaine =

American philosopher

William Thomas Valerio Fontaine (English: /fɒnˈteɪn/; born William Thomas Fontaine; December 2, 1909 – December 29, 1968) was an American philosopher. Teaching at the University of Pennsylvania from 1947 to 1967, he was an American professor of philosophy in the Ivy League. He was African American and advocated for African American rights.

== Early life and career ==
Fontaine was born in Chester, Pennsylvania, an industrial town southwest of Philadelphia. His father worked in a steel mill on the Delaware River. Enrolling in Chester High School at the age of 12, Fontaine graduated in the top third of his class. After his parents died in the 1930s, his aunt raised his younger siblings and funded their continued education.

In 1926 Fontaine enrolled in Lincoln University, a school about 30 miles west of Chester. He wrote poems and analytic essays for the school newspaper, in which he argued that African Americans needed to show "ability, aggressiveness, and cooperation" to succeed. He graduated first in his class in 1930.

Over the next six years, Fontaine taught Latin, history and government at Lincoln. He also pursued an M.A. in Philosophy from the nearby University of Pennsylvania, which he earned in 1932. He earned his Ph.D. in Philosophy from Penn in 1936.

He worked as a professor of philosophy and history at Southern University in Louisiana from 1936 to 1942. Fontaine married an acquaintance from Philadelphia in 1936, Willabelle Hatton of Iva, South Carolina; they had two daughters, Jean and Vivian.

Fontaine returned to Penn in 1943 and audited graduate courses until 1946. Drafted during World War II, he worked at Holabird Signal Depot in Baltimore, Maryland. He taught basic education to illiterate soldiers.

Fontaine joined the University of Pennsylvania faculty in 1947 as a lecturer and was promoted to Assistant Professor two years later.

== Philosophy ==
Influenced by emotivist philosopher C. L. Stevenson, Fontaine called his own position a "modified ethical relativism". When a group desired a certain state of affairs, he argued, it might alter the attitudes fundamental to its ethical stance. For example, politicians offered employment to blacks during World War I not in order to achieve occupational racial equality, but to avert defeat by Germany. Blacks may not have been as interested in the latter, but they certainly were in the better jobs.

== Political views ==
Raised in an unusually Democratic household in Chester, Fontaine was a strong supporter of the New Deal. During the Truman and later McCarthy eras, Fontaine supported the presidential candidacy of socially liberal Republican governor Harold Stassen, who served as President of Penn from 1948 to 1953.

Fontaine was considerably more opposed to Communism than even to the racism in some Western democracies. As a result, he became a liberal internationalist during the Cold War. He supported Presidents Truman, Eisenhower, and Kennedy in their anti-Communist agendas. At the same time, he strongly supported the growing Civil Rights Movement.

Fontaine expounded his civil rights views in Reflections on Segregation, Desegregation, Power, and Morals, published in 1967. While he supported racial equality, he argued that the growing Black Power movement contained the same intellectual defects that existed in white racism, in that it sought preferential treatment for blacks and the non-participation of whites in black life. Considered too unfocused by contemporaries, the text received no reviews until 40 years after its publication.

== Later life, travels, and Penn career ==
Fontaine was diagnosed with tuberculosis in 1949. After working only one half-time and two years of medical leave, he returned to his normal Penn position in 1955. He received an assistant professorship in 1956, tenure in 1957, and an associate professorship in 1963.

Interested in growing African nationalism in the era of decolonization, Fontaine traveled worldwide to discuss Pan-African issues. In 1959, he attended Pope John XXIII’s address of thanks to those who promoted black culture. The next year, he traveled to Lagos, Nigeria, where he celebrated the inauguration of his classmate, Nnamdi Azikiwe as Governor General. Two years later, as secretary of the American Society of African Culture, he attended a conference on socialism called by Senegalese President Léopold Sédar Senghor.

With the worsening of his tuberculosis, Fontaine finished Reflections in 1967 and went on indefinite medical leave. After being confined to an apartment for more than a year, he died on December 29, 1968 in Philadelphia.

== Legacy ==
In his honor, the University of Pennsylvania established the Fontaine Fellowships in 1970, awarded to "provide the additional funds necessary to students from underrepresented minority groups to pursue full-time doctoral study".

== See also ==
- American philosophy
- List of American philosophers
