= Mary White Ovington =

American activist, NAACP founder (1865–1951)

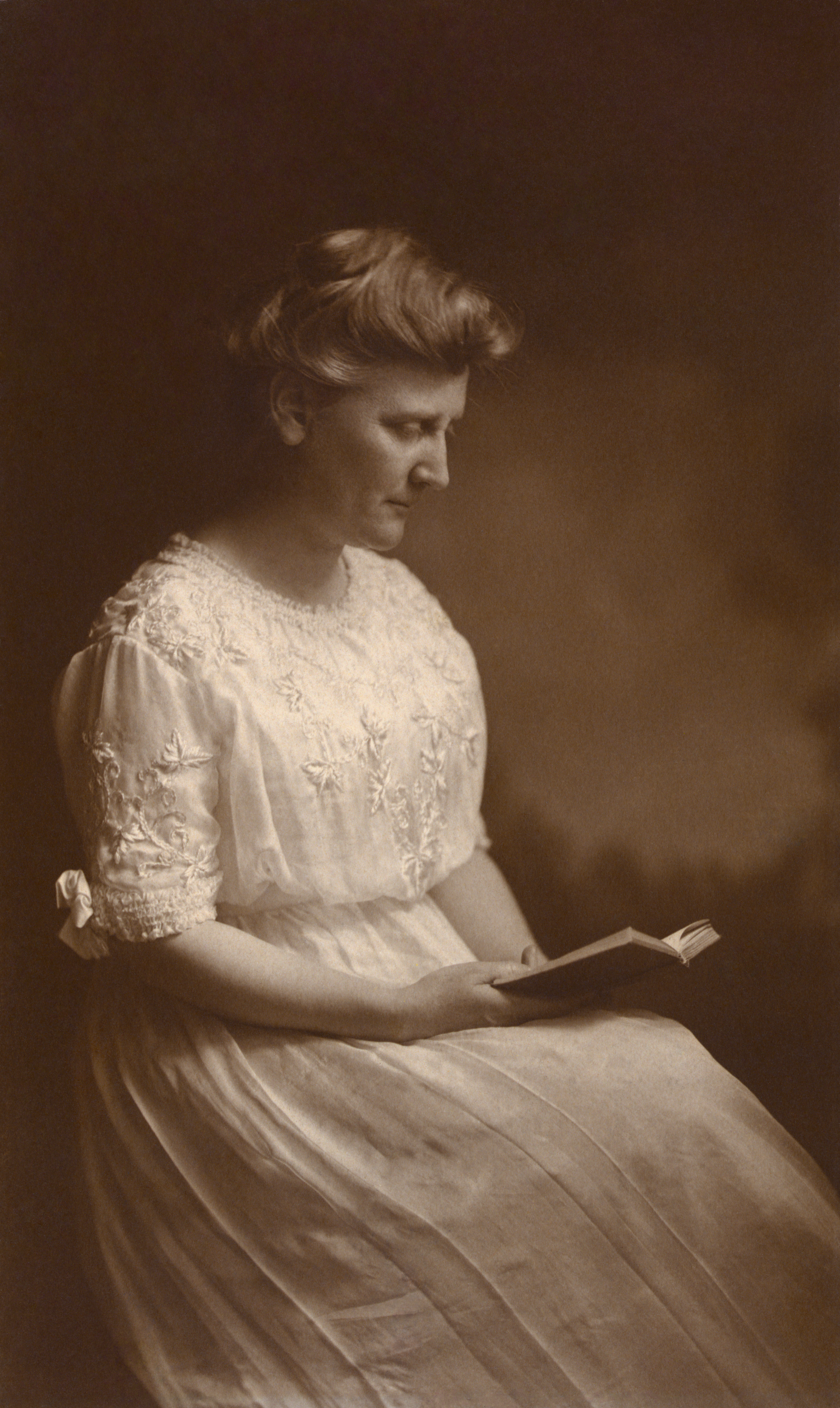
- Ovington, c. 1890–1900

Chair of the National Association for the Advancement of Colored People
- In office 1919–1934
- Preceded by: Joel Elias Spingarn
- Succeeded by: Louis T. Wright

Executive Secretary of the NAACP
- In office 1916
- Preceded by: May Childs Nerney
- Succeeded by: Royal Freeman Nash
- In office 1911–1912
- Preceded by: Frances Blascoer
- Succeeded by: May Childs Nerney

Personal details
- Born: Mary White Ovington; April 11, 1865 Brooklyn, New York, U.S.
- Died: July 15, 1951 (aged 86) Newton Highlands, Massachusetts, U.S.
- Education: Harvard University

Mary White Ovington (April 11, 1865 – July 15, 1951) was an American socialist, suffragist, journalist, and co-founder of the National Association for the Advancement of Colored People (NAACP).

== Biography ==
Mary White Ovington was born April 11, 1865, in Brooklyn. Her grandmother attended the Connecticut congregation of Samuel Joseph May. Her parents, members of the Unitarian Church, were supporters of women's rights and had been involved in the anti-slavery movement. Educated at Packer Collegiate Institute and Radcliffe College of Harvard University, Ovington became involved in the campaign for civil rights in 1890 after hearing Frederick Douglass speak in a Brooklyn church and a 1903 speech by Booker T. Washington at the Social Reform Club.

In 1894, Ovington met Ida B. Wells, while taking Christmas presents to Ida's sister's children. Mary was so appalled by their living conditions that she started working with Wells to force the city to update the tenements. In 1895, she helped found the Greenpoint Settlement in Brooklyn. Appointed head of the project the following year, Ovington remained until 1904, when she was appointed a fellow of the Greenwich House Committee on Social Investigations. Over the next five years, she studied employment and housing problems in black Manhattan. During her investigations, she met W. E. B. Du Bois and was introduced to the founding members of the Niagara Movement.

In 1905, Ovington joined the Socialist Party of America, influenced by the ideas of William Morris. There she met A. Philip Randolph, Floyd Dell, Max Eastman and Jack London, who argued racial problems were as much a matter of class as of race. Ovington wrote for journals and newspapers such as The Masses, New York Evening Post, and the New York Call. She also worked with Ray Stannard Baker and influenced the content of his 1908 book, Following the Color Line.

On September 3, 1908, she read an article written by Socialist William English Walling, entitled "Race War in the North", in The Independent. Walling described a massive race riot directed at black residents in Springfield, Illinois, the hometown of Abraham Lincoln, that led to seven deaths, the destruction of 40 homes and 24 businesses, and 107 indictments against rioters. Walling ended the article by calling for a powerful body of citizens to come to the aid of blacks. Ovington responded to the article by writing to Walling and meeting at his apartment in New York City, along with social worker Dr. Henry Moskowitz. The group decided to launch a campaign by issuing a call for a national conference on the civil and political rights of African Americans on the centennial of Lincoln's birthday, February 12, 1909.

The National Negro Committee held its first meeting in New York on May 31 and June 1, 1909. By May 1910, the National Negro Committee and attendants, at its second conference, organized a permanent body known as the National Association for the Advancement of Colored People (NAACP). Ovington was appointed as its executive secretary. Early members included Josephine Ruffin, Mary Talbert, Mary Church Terrell, Inez Milholland, Jane Addams, George Henry White, W. E. B. Du Bois, Charles Edward Russell, John Dewey, Charles Darrow, Lincoln Steffens, Ray Stannard Baker, Fanny Garrison Villard, Oswald Garrison Villard, and Ida B. Wells-Barnett. The following year, Ovington attended the Universal Races Congress in London. Richetta Randolph Wallace, who had worked with Ovington as a secretary for several years, was hired as the first office staff at NAACP headquarters in 1912.

Ovington remained active in the struggle for women's suffrage. In 1921, she wrote to Alice Paul asking that a black woman be invited to the National Woman's Party celebration of the passing of the nineteenth amendment. Ovington was also a pacifist who opposed the United States's involvement in the First World War. During the war Ovington supported A. Philip Randolph and his magazine The Messenger, which campaigned for black civil rights.

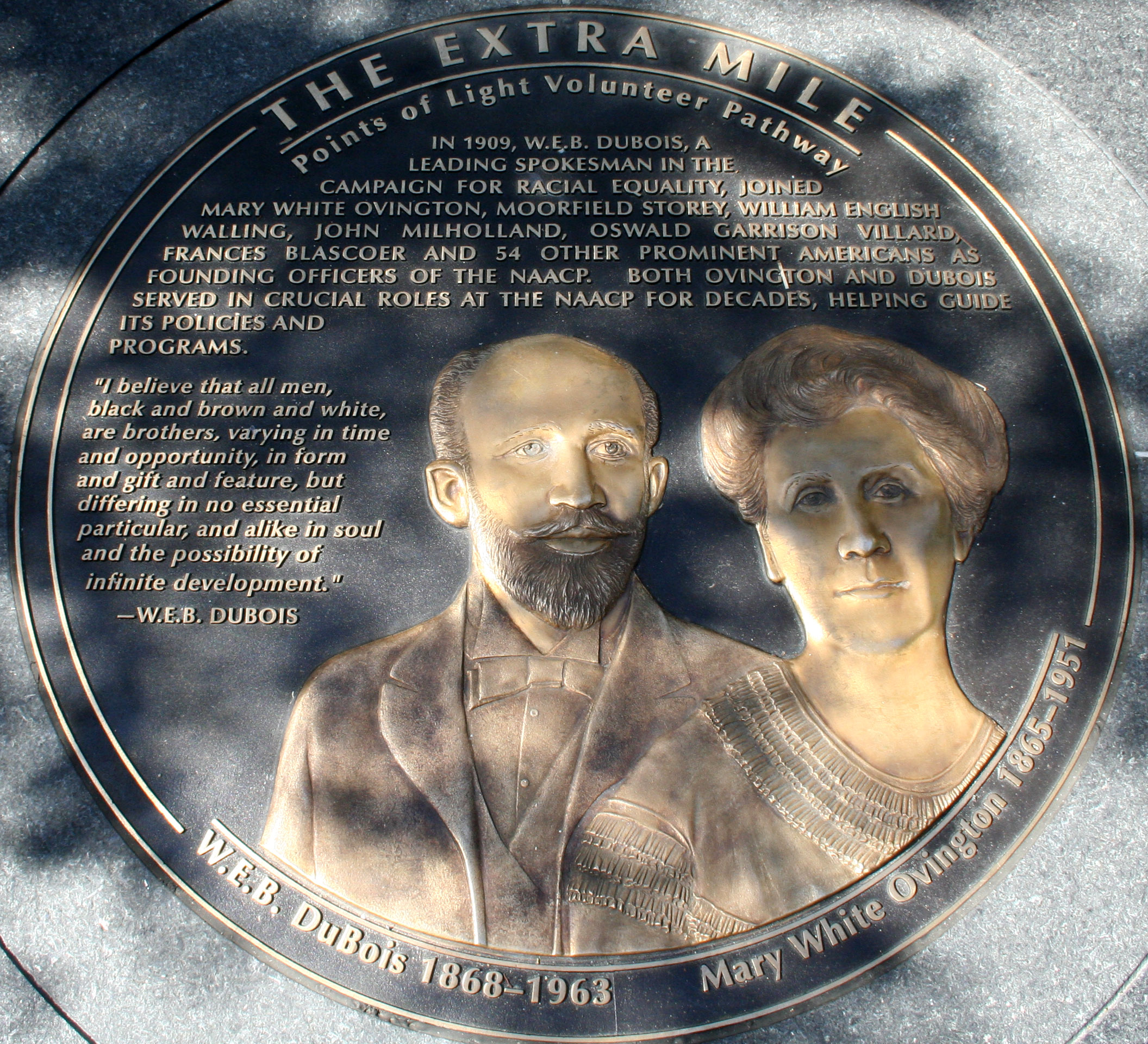
Mary White Ovington's plaque on the National Volunteer Pathway

After the war, Ovington served the NAACP as a board member, executive secretary, and chairman. She inspired other women to join the NAACP, and in so doing, made a significant contribution to the multi-cultural composition of the organization. NAACP fought a long legal battle against segregation and racial discrimination in housing, education, employment, voting, and transportation. They appealed to the Supreme Court to rule that several laws passed by Southern states were unconstitutional and won three important judgments between 1915 and 1923 concerning voting rights and housing.

In June 1934, Ovington gave speeches to 14 different colleges. Her goal was to show the youth that the NAACP association was made up of blacks and whites, specifically to show black youth that there were whites who hated race oppression. During her speeches, Ovington would show the geography of all the NAACP location branches and how far the association has come, saying "They should know the power the race has gained".

The NAACP was criticized by some members of the African-American community. Members of the organization were physically attacked by white racists. John R. Shillady, executive secretary of the NAACP, was badly beaten up when he visited Austin, Texas, in 1919.

Ovington wrote several books and articles, including a study of black Manhattan, Half a Man (1911); Status of the Negro in the United States (1913); Socialism and the Feminist Movement (1914); an anthology for black children, The Upward Path (1919); biographical sketches of prominent African Americans, Portraits in Color (1927); an autobiography, Reminiscences (1932); and a history of the NAACP, The Walls Came Tumbling Down (1947).

== Final years and death ==
In 1947, Ovington was forced to resign from the NAACP due to poor health, ending 38 years of service with the organization. In her eighties, she spent her final years with her sister in Massachusetts and died on July 15, 1951, in Newton Highlands, at the age of 86. Ovington also wrote novels and children's books, including Hazel (1913), which told the story of a young Boston Black girl spending a winter in Alabama at the turn of the century.

== Legacy ==
Mary White Ovington Middle School (Intermediate School 30) in Brooklyn was named in her honor. Ovington is one of the persons named on The Extra Mile—Points of Light Volunteer Pathway National Memorial in Washington, D.C. In 2009, she was depicted on a United States postage stamp with Mary Church Terrell.
