= Ernest Kent Coulter =

American nonprofit leader (1871–1952)

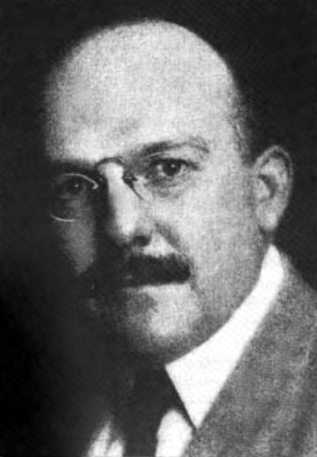
- Born: November 14, 1871; Columbus, Ohio, US
- Died: May 1, 1952 (aged 80); Santa Barbara, California, US
- Burial place: Arlington National Cemetery
- Education: Ohio State University
- Occupations: Journalist, lawyer, civil servant

Ernest Kent Coulter (November 14, 1871 – May 1, 1952), was an American journalist, lawyer, public administrator, and developer of civil society and human welfare programs most notably through his work in child advocacy. During World War I, he rose to the rank of lieutenant colonel in the Army's American Expeditionary Force in Europe.

== Biography ==
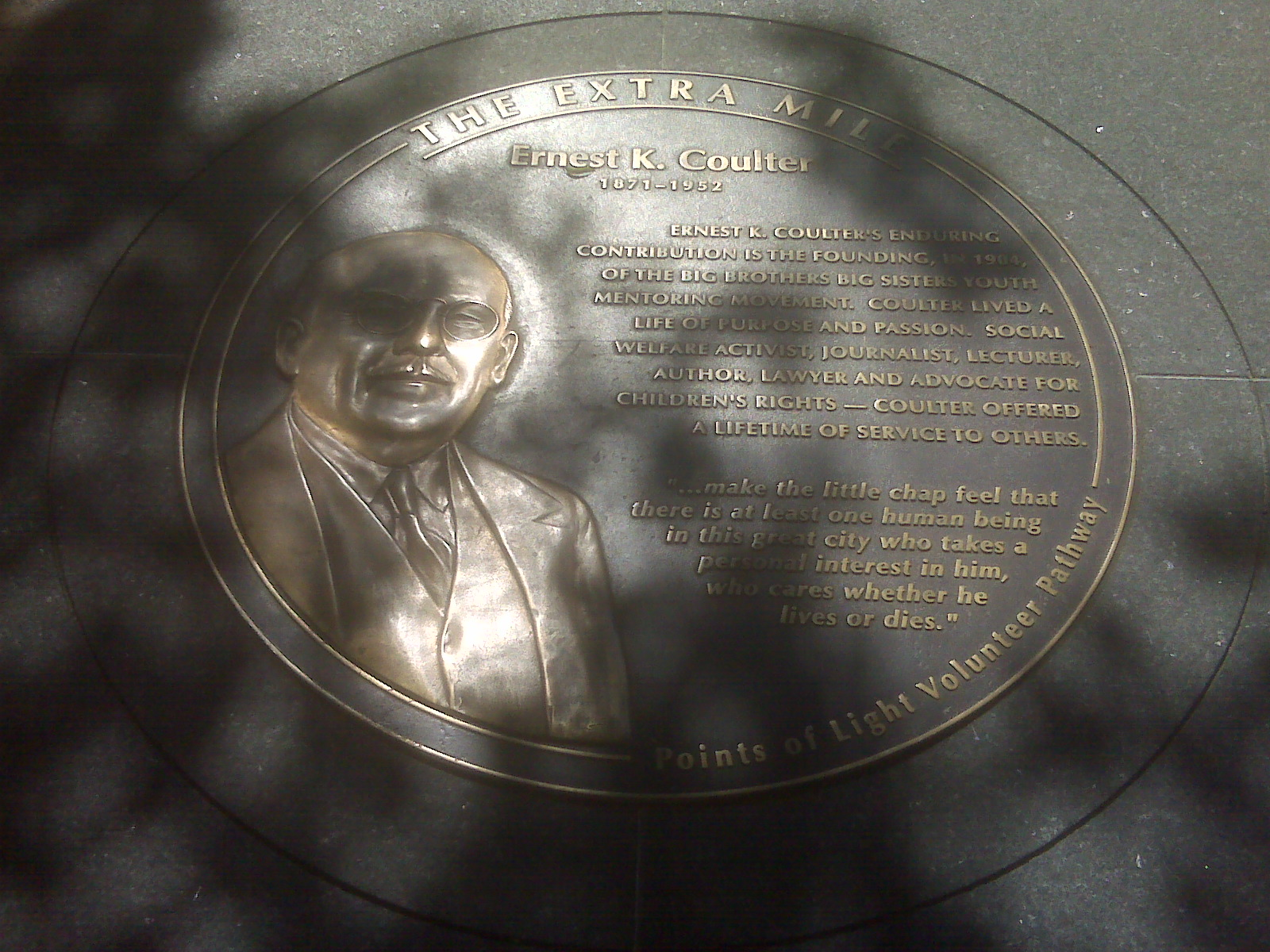
Ernest K Coulter honoree medallion, Washington, DC

Born in Columbus, Ohio, Coulter graduated from Ohio State University, where he was a member of Beta Theta Pi. In 1904 he became a clerk in New York Children's Court. In this capacity he spoke to a local men's club on behalf of the children appearing before the court. Forty volunteers responded resulting in what would become Big Brothers of America and Big Sisters of America, an organization for which he was a lifelong leader and advocate.

The Extra Mile National Monument in Washington, DC honored Coulter when he was chosen as one of its 37 honorees. The Extra Mile pays homage to Americans like Coulter who set their own self-interest aside to help others and successfully brought positive social change to the United States.

He died in Santa Barbara, California in May 1952, and is buried at Arlington National Cemetery.
