= Big Brothers Big Sisters of America =

American youth mentoring organization

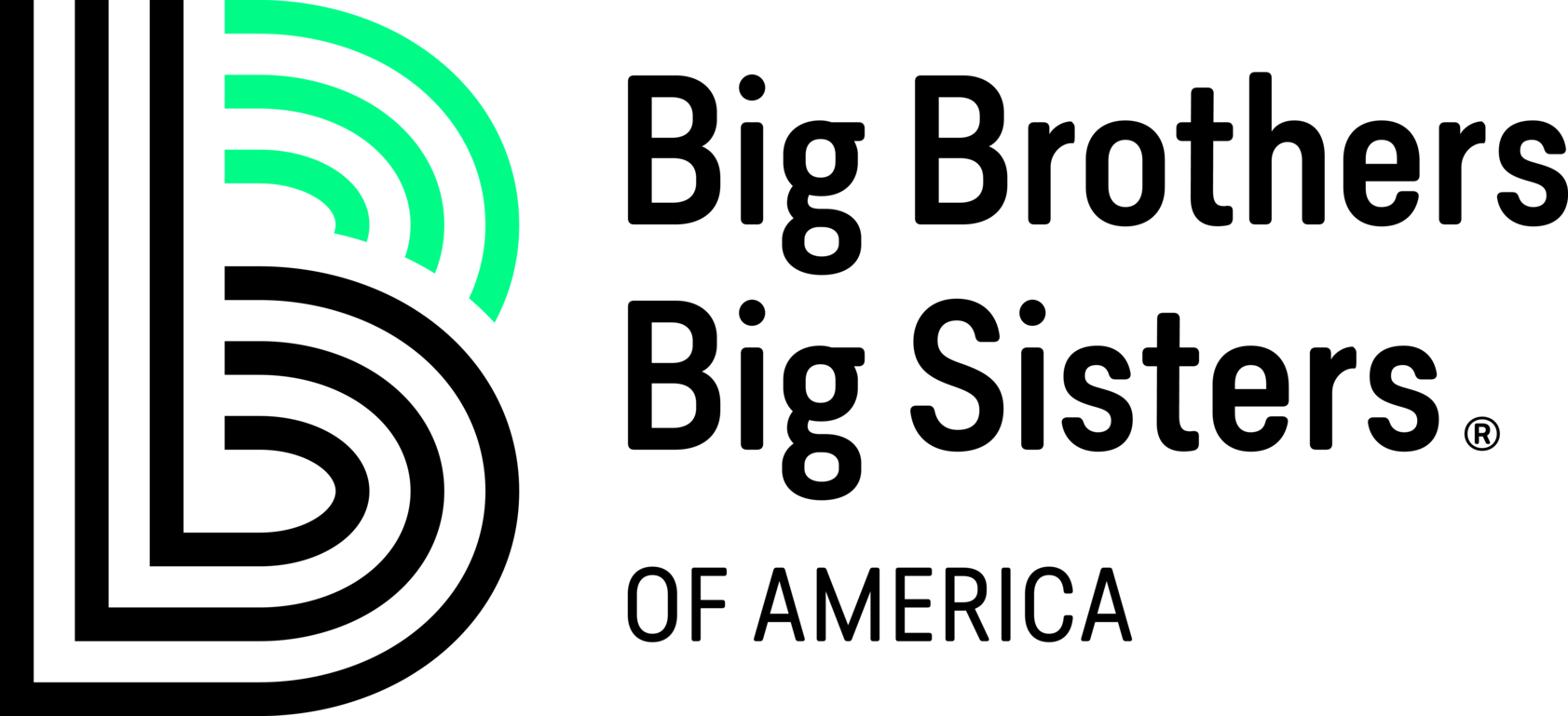
- Founded: 1904; 122 years ago Cincinnati, Ohio; New York
- Founder: Ernest Kent Coulter
- Type: Non-governmental organization
- Headquarters: Tampa, Florida, United States
- Region served: United States
- Key people: Artis Stevens, President and CEO
- Revenue: US$21 million (2019)
- Website: bbbs.org

Big Brothers Big Sisters of America is an American 501(c)(3) non-profit organization whose mission is to "create and support one-to-one mentoring relationships that ignite the power and promise of youth". Adult volunteers are matched with children from age 5 to young adulthood. It was founded by Ernest Kent Coulter.

BBBSA provides guidance, resources, and support to its network of local BBBS agencies.

Local BBBS agencies operate under BBBSA and implement mentoring programs in their communities. These agencies match adult volunteers (Bigs) with children (Littles) ages 5 through young adulthood.

The mentoring programs focus on education, social skills, and personal development.

== Congressional charter ==
The organization holds a congressional charter under Title 36 of the United States Code.

== Impact ==
Public/Private Ventures, an independent Philadelphia-based national research organization, conducted a study from 1994 to 1995, monitoring 950 participants nationwide to study the effects of Big Brothers Big Sisters.

Public/Private Ventures conducted another study in 2011 that evaluated the school-based Big Brothers Big Sisters Program.

In 2025, Big Brothers Big Sisters of America released a study conducted in collaboration with researchers from Harvard University and the U.S. Department of Treasury, examining the long-term effects of their mentorship programs. The study analyzed three decades of data across educational, economic, and social dimensions.

The research revealed economic benefits for participants. Participants showed a 15% increase in earnings between ages 20-25. The program demonstrated cost-effectiveness, with government investment recovery occurring within seven years through increased lifetime earnings and related tax revenue. The annual program costs ranged from $2,000 to $3,000 per youth annually.

The study reported improvements in educational achievement. Mentored youth showed 20% higher college attendance rates compared to non-mentored peers. Additionally, mentored youth demonstrated reduced absenteeism and fewer school suspensions.

The research identified several social outcomes. Participants showed changes in behavioral patterns and stronger social bonds. Mentored youth exhibited reduced dependency on social services. Additionally, the program showed effectiveness for reducing socioeconomic disparities without requiring complete environmental change.

The 2025 study built upon a 1991 randomized control trial conducted by Public/Private Ventures and Mathematica Policy Research. The research methodology involved analyzing participants aged 10-14 who applied to BBBSA's community-based mentoring program in the early 1990s. The demographic composition included 60% male participants and over 50% racial minorities. Data collection combined BBBS administrative records with U.S. tax records, and the study analyzed long-term impact assessment.

== History ==
=== Establishment (1904–1948) ===
The Big Brothers movement began in 1904 when Ernest Coulter, a clerk at the New York Children's Court, noticed an increasing number of young boys appearing before the court. Coulter theorized that providing positive adult mentorship could help prevent youth delinquency. He recruited volunteers from local civic organizations to serve as mentors to these boys, leading to the establishment of Big Brothers of New York City. A similar effort focused on young women was established by the Catholic Ladies of Charity, forming the Catholic Big Sisters organization. In Cincinnati, businessman Irvin F. Westheimer introduced a mentoring initiative after noticing a young boy searching for food near his office.

By 1912, Big Brothers programs had expanded to 26 cities in the United States. The program was supported by Theodore Roosevelt Jr., President Calvin Coolidge, and President Franklin D. Roosevelt, who recognized mentorship as a valuable support system for youth. In 1948, artist Norman Rockwell created an illustration for the Big Brothers Association. Rockwell's illustration helped raise awareness of the mentorship movement.

=== Growth and unification (1951–2003) ===
In 1951, the Big Brothers of the Year program was established to honor outstanding mentors, with recipients including Supreme Court Justice Tom Clark and FBI Director J. Edgar Hoover. In 1958 Congress granted a federal charter to the Big Brothers Association. In 1970, Big Sisters International was incorporated, and in 1977, the two organizations merged to form Big Brothers Big Sisters of America. In the 1980s, the organization established a national headquarters in Philadelphia and was recognition through a U.S. postal stamp. In 1995, a study examined the impact of mentoring on youth development.

=== Modernization and innovation (2004–onwards) ===
Big Brothers Big Sisters of America (BBBSA) marked its centennial in 2004. In 2006, First Lady Laura Bushpublicly supported the organization. A 2007 Super Bowl PSA featuring competing coaches promoted the program. In 2011, BBBSA received the American Institute of Philanthropy's A+ rating, and Philanthropedia ranked it as the #1 nonprofit for at-risk youth. In 2012, BBBSA released its first nationwide Youth Outcomes Survey, providing data on the program's impact across multiple areas of child development. In 2013, BBBSA had an audit by the U.S. Department of Justice that identified non-compliance with grant requirements. The audit led to the freezing of grant disbursements. The organization implemented reforms, including replacing its management team and introducing stricter financial oversight policies. In a settlement with the Justice Department, the organization paid $1.6 million and agreed to enhanced compliance measures, including regular audits, a compliance team, an employee code of conduct, whistleblower protections, and disciplinary policies for financial misconduct. The claims resolved by this settlement were allegations only, with no determination of liability. In 2015, BBBSA relocated its national headquarters to Tampa, Florida.

In November 2020, Big Brothers Big Sisters of America appointed Artis Stevens as its first Black CEO.

== See also ==
- Big Brothers Big Sisters of Northern Nevada
