= Spingarn =

Spingarn is a surname. Notable people with the surname include:

- Joel Elias Spingarn (1875-1939), American educator, literary critic and civic activist
- Arthur B. Spingarn (1878-1971), brother of Joel Elias Spingarn
- Stephen J. Spingarn (1908–1984), son of Joel, American politician during Truman administration

== See also ==
- Spingarn Medal, an annual award for outstanding achievement by an African American
