= Jews in the civil rights movement =

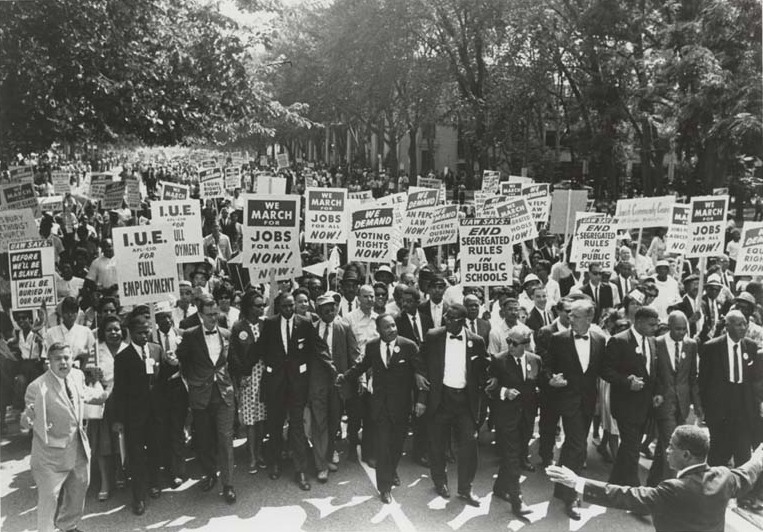
Joachim Prinz with Martin Luther King Jr. at the 1963 March on Washington for Jobs and Freedom. Prinz spoke just before King's "I Have a Dream" speech.

During the civil rights movement (1954–1968), American Jews and African Americans formed strategic alliances to challenge racial inequality and injustice across the country. This built on earlier solidarity between the two communities, which had resulted in, among other things, Jewish activists taking many of the leadership positions within the early NAACP. Jewish individuals and organizations provided financial support, legal expertise, and grassroots activism to support the growing movement nationwide. Prominent Jewish organizations involved in this "Grand Alliance" included the Anti-Defamation League and the American Jewish Congress. Prominent Jewish leaders such as Rabbi Abraham Joshua Heschel and Jack Greenberg marched alongside figures like Martin Luther King Jr. and contributed significantly to landmark legal victories.

While this period is sometimes remembered as a "golden age" of African American–Jewish relations, modern scholars point out that there were still disagreements and tensions between Black people and Jews at the time. The reasons for collaborating were also diverse, and often motivated by politics as much as moral, ethical and religious concerns. Since the 1960s, despite disagreements on issues such as affirmative action in higher education, both Black and Jewish communities and community leaders have collaborated on general and specific campaigns to tackle discrimination.

== Background ==
=== Overview of the civil rights movement ===
From the mid-1950s to the late 1960s, the civil-rights movement organized to obtain legalized racial equality and justice in the United States. Rooted in the aftermath of slavery and segregation, the movement sought to highlight, discuss, and dismantle legalized discrimination based on race by, amongst other things, studying and applying the words of the Sermon on the Mount, the documents of America's Founding Fathers, and the words and techniques of Mohandas Gandhi.

Led by prominent figures like Martin Luther King Jr. and James Bevel, activists employed nonviolence, civil disobedience, protests, and legal challenges to peacefully address legalized racial inequality. Landmark events, such as the Montgomery bus boycott, the Birmingham children's crusade, the March on Washington, the Selma to Montgomery marches; and the passage of the Civil Rights Act of 1964, Voting Rights Act of 1965, and Fair Housing Act of 1968, marked significant milestones in ending legalized segregation, antisemitism, and institutionalized racism. The Civil Rights Movement laid the groundwork for subsequent social justice movements, shaping the national dialogue on equality, civil liberties, and the ongoing pursuit of a more just and inclusive society.

=== Overview of Jews and Jewish organizations in the civil rights movement ===
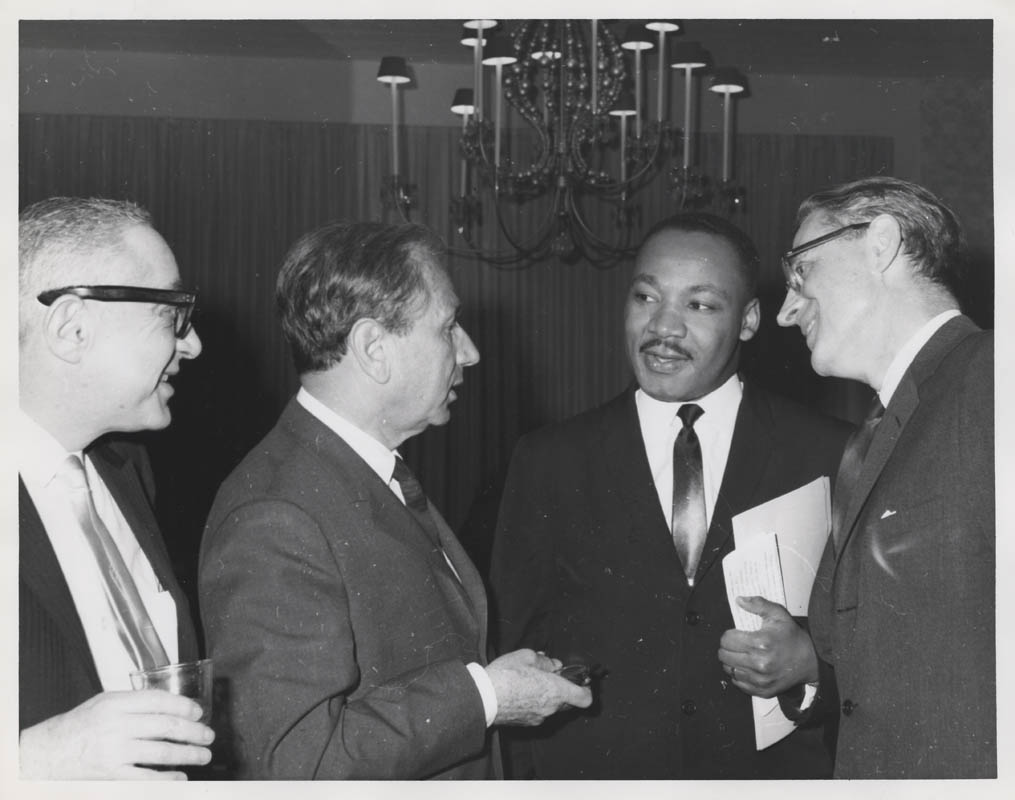
Joachim Prinz, Martin Luther King Jr., and Shad Polier at American Jewish Congress fundraising event

Several major Jewish organizations, and many Jewish individuals, openly supported and worked with the civil rights movement and the organizations which preceded it. In 1909, Jewish activists such as Julius Rosenthal, Lillian Wald, Rabbi Emil G. Hirsch, Stephen Wise, and Henry Moskowitz were among those who formed the National Association for the Advancement of Colored People (NAACP), along with African-American activists such as W. E. B. Du Bois, Ida B. Wells-Barnett, and Mary Church Terrell. Collaboration continued in 1912 when Julius Rosenwald and Booker T. Washington worked together to improve Southern black education. These early partnerships laid the groundwork for future alliances between black and Jewish communities, such as the bipartisan Congressional Caucus on Black–Jewish Relations.

In the 1960s, among attorneys serving the civil rights movement in the South, 50% were Jews. Jews also accounted for more than 50% of the White people who challenged the Jim Crow laws in Mississippi. Many Jews, perceiving a shared history of persecution, identified with the struggles of African Americans and were motivated by a commitment to social justice. Many African Americans similarly identified with the struggles of the Jews in the Bible. Within organizations like the NAACP, Jewish leaders such as Joel Elias Spingarn and his brother Arthur B. Spingarn were instrumental in shaping legal strategies and advocating for equal rights. The Anti-Defamation League (ADL) expanded its mission beyond combating antisemitism to address all forms of discrimination. Among the American Jewish Congress, leaders like Rabbi Joachim Prinz actively participated in key civil rights events, including the historic March on Washington in 1963.

On an individual level, figures like Rabbi Abraham Joshua Heschel marched alongside Martin Luther King Jr.; both individuals emphasized the commonalities between their struggles. In the late 1950s, racist attacks on Jews and Jewish institutions were also increasing, including two notable attacks in 1958: on The Temple Reform synagogue in Atlanta, Georgia and the Temple Beth El Conservative synagogue in Birmingham, Alabama. This spurred many Jews to join the civil rights movement to oppose racism and segregation. During the Freedom Summer, the deaths of Jewish activists Michael Schwerner and Andrew Goodman, alongside Black activist James Chaney, resulted in many more American Jews joining the movement.

== Jews and civil activism in the United States ==
=== Jews as a minority in the United States ===
Major waves of Jewish immigration to the United States commenced in the 19th century, with the first notable wave featuring German-speaking Jews seeking economic opportunities and religious freedoms. In the latter part of the 19th century and the early 20th century, a large number of Eastern European Jews arrived in America to flee persecution and economic hardships. These immigrants, primarily Ashkenazi Jews, settled in urban areas such as New York City, often forming communities near Black neighborhoods. Black communities also formed in Jewish neighborhoods due to cheaper rent and less antagonism toward the black population. Having faced antisemitism and now encountering Black people in their daily life, many Jews recognized and empathized with the struggles of African Americans. Jews during this period faced social antisemitism, which included barriers to Jews in higher education, and exclusion from administrative mechanisms, hotels and more.

=== Jews in social justice movements prior to the civil-rights movement ===
In the early 20th century, Jewish immigrants, particularly those from Eastern Europe, faced harsh working conditions in industries such as garment manufacturing. This led to Jewish participation in labor movements, advocating for fair wages and improved working conditions. The Triangle Shirtwaist Factory fire in 1911, which claimed the lives of predominantly Jewish and Italian immigrant garment workers, galvanized the Jewish community's involvement in workers' rights. Jewish labor activists such as Clara Lemlich and Rose Schneiderman organized labor strikes and pushed for legislative reforms.

During the Progressive Era, Jewish reformers like Lillian Wald were instrumental in establishing settlement houses and social welfare organizations aimed at addressing the socio-economic challenges faced by immigrants in urban centers. Jews were also actively involved in the women's suffrage movement, with figures like Rose Schneiderman advocating for women's rights and suffrage alongside their broader commitment to social justice causes. This early 20th-century Jewish community activism paved the way for broader Jewish involvement in the civil rights movement.

== Civil rights organizations ==
=== National Association for the Advancement of Colored People ===
The National Association for the Advancement of Colored People (NAACP) was established in 1909 in response to the widespread racial violence and discrimination against African Americans. At its inception, the NAACP aimed to dismantle institutionalized racism and secure civil rights for African Americans through legal means. Jewish individuals played a role in the formation and early leadership of the NAACP. Joel Elias Spingarn — a prominent Jewish scholar, educator, and civil rights advocate — served as the organization's chairman from 1913 to 1919, where he shaped the organization's strategies and contributed to its future growth, according to the NAACP. His brother, Arthur B. Spingarn, chaired the organization for two decades from 1919. The Spingarn brothers actively contributed to legal initiatives within the NAACP: Arthur worked pro bono as head of the NAACP's legal committee and Joel was instrumental in advancing key NAACP legal efforts, such as its focus on anti-lynching legislation and educational equality.

Jewish lawyers within the NAACP, such as Jack Greenberg (who succeeded Thurgood Marshall as the head of the NAACP Legal Defense Fund) played critical roles in landmark cases like Brown v. Board of Education, which declared state laws establishing separate public schools for black and white students to be unconstitutional. Herbert Hill was the NAACP labor secretary from 1951 to 1977. He played a significant role in advancing the cause of economic justice and equality for African American workers.

=== Anti-Defamation League ===
The Anti-Defamation League's involvement in the civil rights movement included partnerships, legal interventions, opposition to hate groups, and educational initiatives. Established in 1913, the Anti-Defamation League (ADL) originally focused on combatting antisemitism and defending the rights of Jews in the United States. As its mission evolved, the ADL expanded its commitment to fighting all forms of discrimination. During the Civil Rights Movement, the ADL supported African American leaders and organizations, including Dr. Martin Luther King Jr. It initiated educational initiatives aimed at promoting tolerance and cooperation as a way to end racism.

The ADL also offered financial and legal support to the civil rights movement. In a landmark move, the ADL filed an amicus curiae brief in the historic case of Brown v. Board of Education (1954). This was pivotal in ending racial segregation in public schools. The ADL also actively opposed segregationist organizations like the Ku Klux Klan, monitoring and exposing hate groups that promoted discrimination and violence against African Americans.

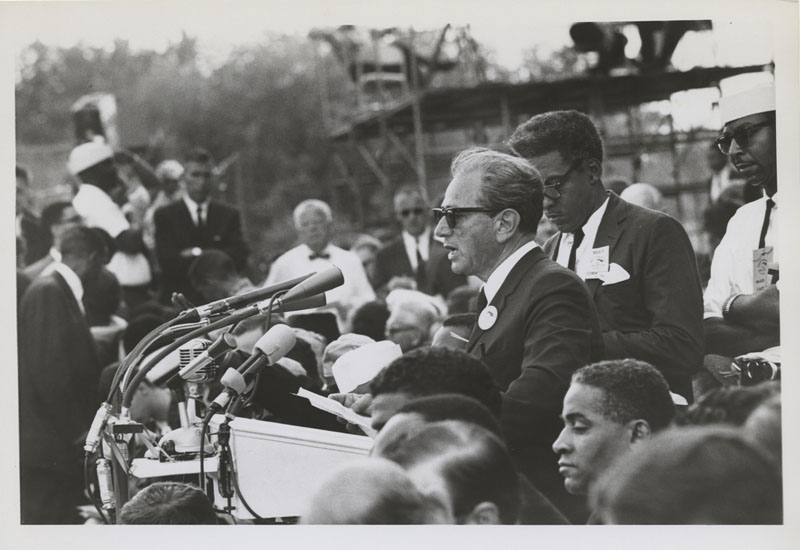
Joachim Prinz speaking at March on Washington, with Bayard Rustin pictured, 1963

=== American Jewish Congress ===
Founded in 1918, the American Jewish Congress (AJC) was committed to promoting social justice and equality, and actively engaged in various civil rights initiatives. Stanley Levison, a close friend and advisor to Martin Luther King Jr., served on the Manhattan board of the AJC. The two men met when Levinson began fundraising for the Montgomery bus boycott in 1956.

In January 1957, King Jr. reached out to the AJC's then-president, Israel Goldstein, looking to broaden support for the Southern Negro Leaders Conference. In response, Goldstein publicly condemned the bombing of Black churches and parsonages that same month. In 1958, King Jr. was invited by Levinson to speak to the AJC's Miami conference — one of the few anti-segregationist organizations to convene in the South — and highlighted the shared impact of racism and segregation upon Blacks and Jews alike.

Rabbi Joachim Prinz, who served as the AJC's president after Goldstein (1958–1966), emphasized the shared commitment to justice among diverse communities — most notably in his speech at the historic March on Washington for Jobs and Freedom in 1963, delivered just before King's iconic "I Have a Dream" address.

=== American Jewish Committee ===
The American Jewish Committee, formed in 1906, took the position that the rights of Jews in the United States could be best protected by pursuing equality of all Americans. AJC commissioned the social science research of black psychologist Kenneth Clark, which demonstrated how segregation affected black children. AJC cited Clark's research in its amicus curiae brief in support of Oliver Brown during the 1954 U.S. Supreme Court case Brown v. Board of Education. The court cited Clark's research in its decision establishing racial segregation in public schools were unconstitutional.

AJC, along with the ADL and American Jewish Congress, believed that racial quotas were unconstitutional, and Jewish groups opposed their use in determining admission in higher education in the United States. For this reason, AJC celebrated the landmark 1978 U.S. Supreme Court decision in Regents of the University of California v. Bakke that struck down racial quotas in university admissions. Despite the Bakke decision, AJC supported affirmative action programs for disadvantaged groups. By 2003, the organization's opposition to affirmative action had tempered. The AJC's director of public policy Jeffrey Sinesky said that "It's the quota concept that's anathema" after the organization submitted a brief in defense of the University of Michigan's affirmative action program.

According to the New York Times, the AJC had taken a leading role in the struggle for equal rights for African Americans in the United States by the early 1990s.

== Prominent Jewish activists ==
=== Rabbi Abraham Joshua Heschel ===
Rabbi Abraham Joshua Heschel, born in 1907 in Poland, was a prominent Jewish theologian and philosopher. Fleeing the Nazis, Heschel immigrated to the United States in 1940, where he became a noted Jewish scholar. He emphasized the spiritual and ethical dimensions of Judaism, advocating for social justice and interfaith understanding. In the 1960s, Rabbi Heschel marched alongside his friend Dr. Martin Luther King Jr. at key events in the civil rights movement such as the Selma to Montgomery march. Heschel emphasized the moral and spiritual duty to confront injustice, once saying, "I felt my legs were praying" during the marches.

=== Murder of Michael Schwerner and Andrew Goodman in Mississippi ===
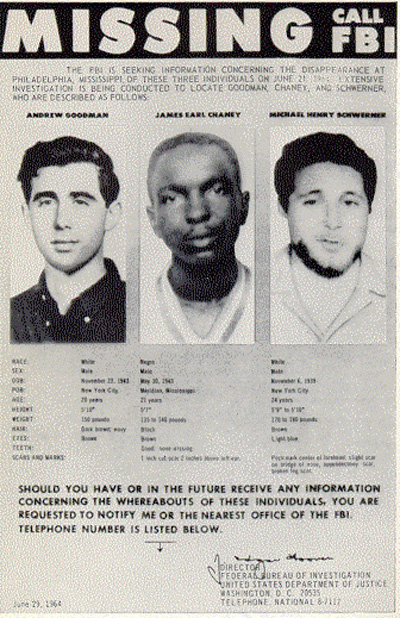
FBI poster of missing

Michael Schwerner and Andrew Goodman were Jewish civil rights activists who were murdered, along with Black activist James Chaney, during the Freedom Summer campaign in Mississippi in 1964. The three young men were involved in efforts to register African American voters in the segregated South.

On June 21, 1964, the trio were investigating the burning of a Black church when they were arrested by local law enforcement. Later that evening, they were released but were ambushed by members of the Ku Klux Klan. The activists were brutally beaten and murdered, their bodies buried in an earthen dam.

The deaths of Schwerner, Goodman and Chaney shocked the nation, and intensified the urgency of the Civil Rights Movement. Outrage over the murders contributed to increased national attention on the struggles in the South and support for the Civil Rights Act of 1964 and the Voting Rights Act of 1965 — both aimed at dismantling segregation and ensuring the right to vote for African Americans. In 1967, seven men, including Klan leader Edgar Ray Killen, were convicted. Despite the convictions, it took decades for everyone responsible to face justice.

=== Jack Greenberg ===
Jack Greenberg was a distinguished American attorney and civil rights champion known for his leadership at the NAACP Legal Defense and Educational Fund (LDF) from 1961 to 1984. Succeeding Thurgood Marshall, Greenberg's tenure marked a continuation of the LDF's commitment to strategic litigation for social change. Greenberg contributed to several landmark cases, including the successful defense of James Meredith's right to attend the University of Mississippi in 1962, and Alexander v. Holmes County Board of Education (1969), which compelled the immediate desegregation of public schools.

=== Joachim Prinz ===
Rabbi Joachim Prinz, drawing from his experiences in Germany during Hitler's regime, empathized with the African-American struggle in the United States. During an exploratory visit in 1937 and upon his return to Germany, Prinz expressed his solidarity with African-Americans, emphasizing parallels between their plight and that of German Jews. Settling in Newark, a city with a significant minority community, Prinz spoke against discrimination from his pulpit, participated in protests across the U.S., and advocated against racial prejudice in various aspects of life. At the 1960 AJC Convention, he said:

[As Jews], we work for freedom and equality. This is the heart of what we call the civil rights program....These are not mere words. These are the ideas which...have come to mean so much from the days when the author of third book of Moses coined that great sentence about liberty which is engraved upon the Liberty Bell in Philadelphia.

As president of the American Jewish Congress (AJC), Prinz sought to position the organization prominently in the civil rights movement. He met with Martin Luther King Jr. in 1958, requesting support for a conference on integration at the White House. Speaking at the March on Washington in 1963, Prinz stressed the importance of speaking out against discrimination based on his experiences in Nazi Germany. His address preceded Martin Luther King Jr.'s famous "I Have a Dream" speech. In it, he stated: "the most urgent, the most disgraceful, the most shameful and the most tragic problem is silence." Prinz remained involved in civil rights afterwards, and attended King's funeral in 1968 after his assassination.

== Criticism ==
Historically, the Civil Rights Era-collaboration between African American and Jewish leaders has been portrayed as a significant and positive development, marking a critical alliance against racial segregation and discrimination in the United States. This "Grand Alliance" is sometimes portrayed as a "golden age" of cooperation. The achievements of this partnership include legislative victories like the Civil Rights Act of 1964 and the Voting Rights Act of 1965, which helped dismantle legal barriers to equality.

Despite the successes of the Civil Rights Era, however, tensions and challenges between the two communities still existed. Political activist and philosopher Cornel West has argued that even during the Civil Rights Era there was not a time "free of tension and friction" between the two communities. In 2001, he argued that Black people tended to downplay the collaboration, while Jews tended to romanticize it as a "golden age".

Jeff Melnick, professor of American studies at UMass Boston, has argued that "the Black–Jewish alliance" is mostly a myth and that it sometimes leads to the assumption that African Americans "owe a debt for Jewish advocacy." Hannah Labovitz argued against the romanticization of the era, claiming it was not "a story about white Jews intervening to save the day after experiencing their own challenges, but rather one damaged community doing what it could to help another."

Historian Melanie Kaye/Kantrowitz argued that only a few hundred non-Southern Jews took part in activism in the South, that both sides often failed to understand each other's point of view, and that the relationship was "frequently out of touch". Political scientist Andrew Hacker pointed to a disparity between Blacks' and Jews' perceptions of events, highlighting the differences in tone and focus between the two communities. Julius Lester, an African American convert to Judaism, argued that some African Americans may have rejected the perceived paternalism of some Jews within the civil rights movement, which Hacker labelled a form of "benevolent racism".

== Legacy ==
As the Civil Rights Movement progressed, differences in approach, priorities, and perspectives arose between African American and Jewish leaders. Some tensions were rooted in varying historical and cultural contexts, as well as differences in socio-economic status. As the 1960s unfolded, political and ideological shifts contributed to strains in the relationship, such as the rise of the Black power movement, increasing pro-Palestinian solidarity among African Americans, increasing support among American Jews for Israel after the Six-Day war, and Israeli support for South Africa during apartheid.

As Black people continued to face widespread discrimination and struggled to make progress in society, many Black activists became increasingly outspoken about issues such as affirmative action that Jews often opposed because of their similarity to quotas. Many Jews preferred meritocracy, which Black activists often distrusted, feeling it had historically been used to exclude them.

Many liberal Jews also began to move out of areas with increasing Black populations. Cheryl Greenberg attributes this to the perceived "deterioration of their schools and neighborhoods" and fears of violence due to civil rights protests. Some Jewish leaders also faced criticism from within their own communities for their perceived alignment with movements critical of Israel. Meanwhile, some Black leaders felt that Jewish support for the civil rights movement was paternalistic or condescending, or that Jewish racism was taken less seriously than Black antisemitism.

Despite the challenges and tensions faced between Black activists and their Jewish allies during the civil rights movement, however, collaborations continued between both communities. In 1982, Representative John Lewis, a civil rights icon, joined forces with concerned citizens from Atlanta's Black and Jewish communities to campaign for the renewal of the Voting Rights Act. Lewis marched alongside Jewish community members and co-established the Atlanta Black-Jewish Coalition, emphasizing open dialogue and partnership. Throughout his career, Lewis consistently spoke out against antisemitism, advocated for Israel, and supported the Soviet Jewry movement in the 1970s and 1980s. His longstanding relationship with AJC included receiving various honors, and he served as a founding co-chair for the Congressional Caucus on Black–Jewish Relations.

More recently, groups such as Rekindle, the Black/Jewish Justice Alliance, the Black Jewish Entertainment Alliance, and the Black and Jewish Leaders of Tomorrow have aimed to establish new cooperations between Black and Jewish Americans. In 2020, Georgia Senators Raphael Warnock (who preached at the same church as Martin Luther King Jr.) and Jon Ossoff both won their seats through a political alliance seen as a continuation of the "Grand Alliance". They were the first Black and first Jewish Senators in the state, respectively.

In 2024, the Jewish Community Relations Council (JCRC) of the Jewish Federation of Greater Philadelphia and the Culture Changing Christians announced a new partnership called New Golden Age. The collaboration aims to strengthen links between the Black and Jewish communities, combat hate, and strengthen the local social security net.

== See also ==
- African American history
- African American–Jewish relations
- Antisemitism in the United States
- Antisemitism in the United States in the 21st century
- History of antisemitism in the United States
- History of the Jews in the United States
- Jews in the Southern United States
- Joseph Gelders (1898–1950), a Jewish civil rights activist
- Lynching of American Jews, an aspect of lynching in the United States
- Racism against African Americans
- Racism in the United States
- Religious discrimination in the United States
