= The Killer That Stalked New York =

1950 film by Earl McEvoy

- Theatrical release poster
- Directed by: Earl McEvoy
- Screenplay by: Harry Essex
- Based on: "Smallpox, the Killer That Stalks New York"; 1948 Cosmopolitan article by Milton Lehman
- Produced by: Robert Cohn
- Starring: Evelyn Keyes; Charles Korvin; William Bishop
- Narrated by: Reed Hadley
- Cinematography: Joseph F. Biroc (as Joseph Biroc)
- Edited by: Jerome Thoms
- Music by: Hans J. Salter (as Hans Salter)
- Production company: Robert Cohn Productions
- Distributed by: Columbia Pictures
- Release date: December 1, 1950 (United States)
- Running time: 79 minutes 76 minutes (Encore-Mystery Library Print)
- Country: United States
- Language: English

The Killer That Stalked New York (also known as Frightened City) is a 1950 American film noir directed by Earl McEvoy and starring Evelyn Keyes, Charles Korvin and William Bishop. The film, shot on location and in a semi-documentary style, is about diamond smugglers who unknowingly start a smallpox outbreak in the New York City of 1947. It is based on the real threat of a smallpox epidemic in the city, as described in a story taken from a 1948 Cosmopolitan magazine article by Milton Lehman.

== Plot ==
Arriving at New York City's Pennsylvania Station after a trip to Cuba, Sheila Bennet, who is smuggling $50,000 worth of diamonds into the country, realizes that she is being followed by the authorities. She mails the diamonds to her husband Matt Krane instead of carrying them around, and then tries to shake the Treasury agent following her.

Feeling sick, Sheila nearly faints on the street, and a police officer takes her to a local clinic. While there, she encounters a little girl and inadvertently infects her. Sheila is misdiagnosed as having a common cold, and she returns home. When the girl is admitted to the hospital, she is diagnosed with smallpox.

Matt, who has been cheating on Sheila with her sister Francie, attempts to abscond without either of them when the diamonds finally arrive through the mail. However, his fence cannot buy the diamonds because the police are searching for them. Matt will have to wait for ten days for the cash, so he cannot leave New York. Sheila confronts Francie, who later kills herself because of Matt's betrayal, and Sheila seeks revenge.

Finding a growing number of smallpox victims, city officials attempt to vaccinate everyone in New York to prevent an epidemic, but they quickly exhaust their supply of serum, causing a panic in the city. Tracking the victims, agents realize that the disease carrier and the diamond smuggler are the same person. Sheila, increasingly sick but unaware that she has smallpox, continues to elude capture. She returns to the doctor at the clinic for more medicine. After the doctor explains her illness and tries to convince her to surrender, she shoots him in the arm and escapes.

Sheila eventually finds Matt, who tries to escape from the police but falls from a building ledge to his death. Sheila nearly attempts to drop herself from the ledge until the doctor informs her that the little girl whom she had met has died. Sheila surrenders to the authorities and, before succumbing to the disease, provides information on the people whom she had contacted.

== Cast ==
- Evelyn Keyes as Sheila Bennet
- Charles Korvin as Matt Krane
- William Bishop as Dr. Ben Wood
- Dorothy Malone as Alice Lorie
- Lola Albright as Francie Bennet
- Barry Kelley as Treasury Agent Johnson
- Carl Benton Reid as Health Commissioner Ellis
- Ludwig Donath as Dr. Cooper
- Art Smith as Anthony Moss
- Whit Bissell as Sid Bennet
- Roy Roberts as Mayor of New York
- Connie Gilchrist as Belle – the Landlady
- Dan Riss as Skrip
- Harry Shannon as Police Officer Houlihan
- Jim Backus as Willie Dennis, the nightclub owner

== Release ==
In March 1950, Columbia Pictures announced that it had retitled the film Frightened City, but the amended title was only used for international release. When the film opened in the United States in December 1950, it still bore the title The Killer That Stalked New York.

== Reception ==
The Killer That Stalked New York has a On the review aggregator website Rotten Tomatoes, 33% of 6 critics' reviews are positive, with an average rating of 3.33/10. The website's consensus reads: "."

=== Critical response ===
In a contemporary review for The New York Times, critic Bosley Crowther called the film "potentially but not sufficiently intriguing" and wrote: "By bringing his cameras to New York and filming realistic hospital scenes, mass vaccinations and local details, Director Earl McEvoy has achieved a respectable simulation of the anxiety of a community when confronted with a possible plague. And he has managed to get some fascination into the desperate devices by which the health authorities, headed by a young physician, attempt to pinpoint the fatal carrier. But, unfortunately, the script of Harry Essex, based on a factual magazine piece, has a bad tendency to ramble and to confuse two separate hunts. And the performances of the principal characters, while adequate, have little punch."

Reviewer Wanda Hale of the New York Daily News wrote: "'The Killer' is not as dramatic, realistic or as brilliantly directed as 'Panic in the Streets,' the 20th Century-Fox film based on such a predicament. However, it has a reasonable amount of suspense ... The story that holds this frantic search together is more imaginative than realistic but it is interesting to see how such a situation is controlled by the health department."

Critic Mae Tinée of the Chicago Tribune also compared the film negatively against Panic in the Streets, writing: "While authentic background provides a touch of the genuine, the film in over-all skill does not compare with its predecessor. The script writers are included to belabor their points and to introduce a maximum of complications into the plot."

== See also ==
- Panic in the Streets, a 1950 film about pneumonic plague spread by criminals in New Orleans
- 80,000 Suspects, a 1963 film concerning an outbreak of smallpox in Bath, England
- Variola Vera, a 1972 film concerning an outbreak of smallpox in Yugoslavia
