= CBHA =

CBHA may refer to:

- CBHA-FM, a radio station (90.5 FM) licensed to Halifax, Nova Scotia, Canada
- Community-based Housing Association
- chiral bishydroxamic acid - used in asymmetric synthesis
- Consortium of British Humanitarian Agencies
- Canadian Ball Hockey Association, the governing body of the sport of ball hockey in Canada
- Chicago Better Housing Association
