= Althea T. L. Simmons =

US civil rights activist and attorney

- Born: April 17, 1924
- Died: September 13, 1990 (aged 66); Washington D.C.
- Education: Southern University; Howard University; University of Illinois
- Occupations: Attorney, civil rights activist
- Employer: NAACP

Althea T. L. Simmons (April 17, 1924 – September 13, 1990) was a civil rights activist and attorney with the NAACP for over 35 years. Simmons was the head of the NAACP's Washington D.C. office and its chief lobbyist from 1979 to 1990. She was well known for her effective lobbying, close monitoring of lawmakers' voting habits, and her commanding presence.

== Early life ==
Simmons was born in Shreveport, Louisiana to M.M. Simmons and B.E. Simmons. As a teen, she lived with her family in Winnsboro, Louisiana. She attended college at Southern University, a historically Black university in Baton Rouge, and earned a law degree from Howard University. Simmons also earned a marketing degree from the University of Illinois.

== Career ==
Simmons joined the NAACP in the mid-1950s and worked in various capacities. She joined NAACP's West Coast division in 1961 and worked on issues related to voter registration. In NAACP's New York branch, she was the associate director of branch and field services, and she was also National Education Director, National Training Director, and Director of Special Voter Registration Drives.

As chief lobbyist for the NAACP in Washington D.C. from 1979 to 1990, Simmons exerted her influence on federal civil rights legislation. She helped to pass the 1982 extension and amendment of the Voting Rights Act, worked to make Dr. Martin Luther King Jr.'s birthday a holiday, and also advocated for legislation imposing sanctions on South Africa due to apartheid. Simmons noted that the observance of the Martin Luther King Jr. holiday was an opportunity for white people to learn about race relations, as the history books provided scant information about civil rights.

Simmons also argued against the appointment of William Rehnquist as Chief Justice of the United States Supreme Court, as she alleged that Rehnquist engaged in activities aimed at thwarting voter participation by African Americans and Latinos in the 1960s in Arizona. She also stated Rehnquist's subsequent record as an attorney and judge reflected a very narrow interpretation of the scope of the 14th Amendment and consistent opposition to civil rights laws. In her Senate testimony against Rehnquist's confirmation as chief justice, Simmons noted that "even though a person is a genius, if he lacks compassion, it distorts reality and cripples objectivity."

Simmons closely monitored the voting records of lawmakers, as she observed that "[i]t's not enough to just listen to the politicians at election time. Start monitoring how they vote. Often they will say something on the floor of the House or Senate just to get into the Congressional Record, but they vote just the opposite."

While hospitalized prior to her death, Simmons continued her work and helped lobby for the Civil Rights Act of 1990, which was passed by the United States Congress. It was vetoed by then-President of the United States George H. W. Bush about one month after her death.

On September 17, 1990, four days after her death, U.S. Senator Ted Kennedy read a tribute to Simmons into the Senate's Congressional Record, where he referred to her as the "101st Senator on civil rights" and a "great champion in the continuing struggle to fulfill the constitutional promises of equal justice for all."

== Personal ==
Simmons was an active member of the Asbury United Methodist Church in Washington D.C. She also served as a committee member at the United Methodist Church Board of Pensions. She was a member of the Delta Sigma Theta sorority, which named its Social Action Award after her. Awardees of the Althea T. L. Simmons Social Action Award include Hazel N. Dukes, a member of the NAACP National Board of Directors, and voting rights activist Melanie L. Campbell.

She died at the age of 66 from respiratory failure after hip surgery.

== Selected honors ==
- President's Award of Washburn University
- Howard University Alumni Award for Postgraduate Achievement in Law and Public Service
- Gertrude E. Rush Award of the National Bar Association
- Patricia Roberts Harris Award of Delta Sigma Theta sorority

== Selected publications ==
- Althea T. L. Simmons. From Brown to Detroit: Blueprint for Education, Theory Into Practice, vol. 17, no. 1, 1978, pp. 67–71
- Althea T. L. Simmons. Review of Maggie's American Dream, The Journal of Negro Education, vol. 59, no. 2, 1990, pp. 220–222
- Althea T. L. Simmons. Civil Rights and Reaganomics, The Crisis, vol. 91, no. 4, 1984, pp. 8–10
