= Kivie Kaplan =

American philanthropist and president of the NAACP (1904–1975)

President of the NAACP
- In office 1966–1975
- Preceded by: Arthur B. Spingarn
- Succeeded by: W. Montague Cobb

Personal details
- Born: April 1, 1904 Boston, Massachusetts, U.S.
- Died: May 5, 1975 (aged 71) New York City, New York, U.S.

Kivie Kaplan (April 1, 1904 – May 5, 1975) was an American businessman and philanthropist. He served as president of the National Association for the Advancement of Colored People (NAACP) from 1966 until his death.

== Early life and education ==
Kivie Kaplan was born in Boston, Massachusetts, the youngest of three sons of Benjamin and Celia Kaplan, Lithuanian Jewish immigrants. In 1924, he and his brothers, Joseph and Archie, took over their father's leather business; he helped run the tanneries until 1962 when he retired to devote his time to philanthropic work. In 1925, Kivie Kaplan married Emily Rogers, whom he was married to until his death. They had three children, Sylvia, Jean, and Edward.

== NAACP ==
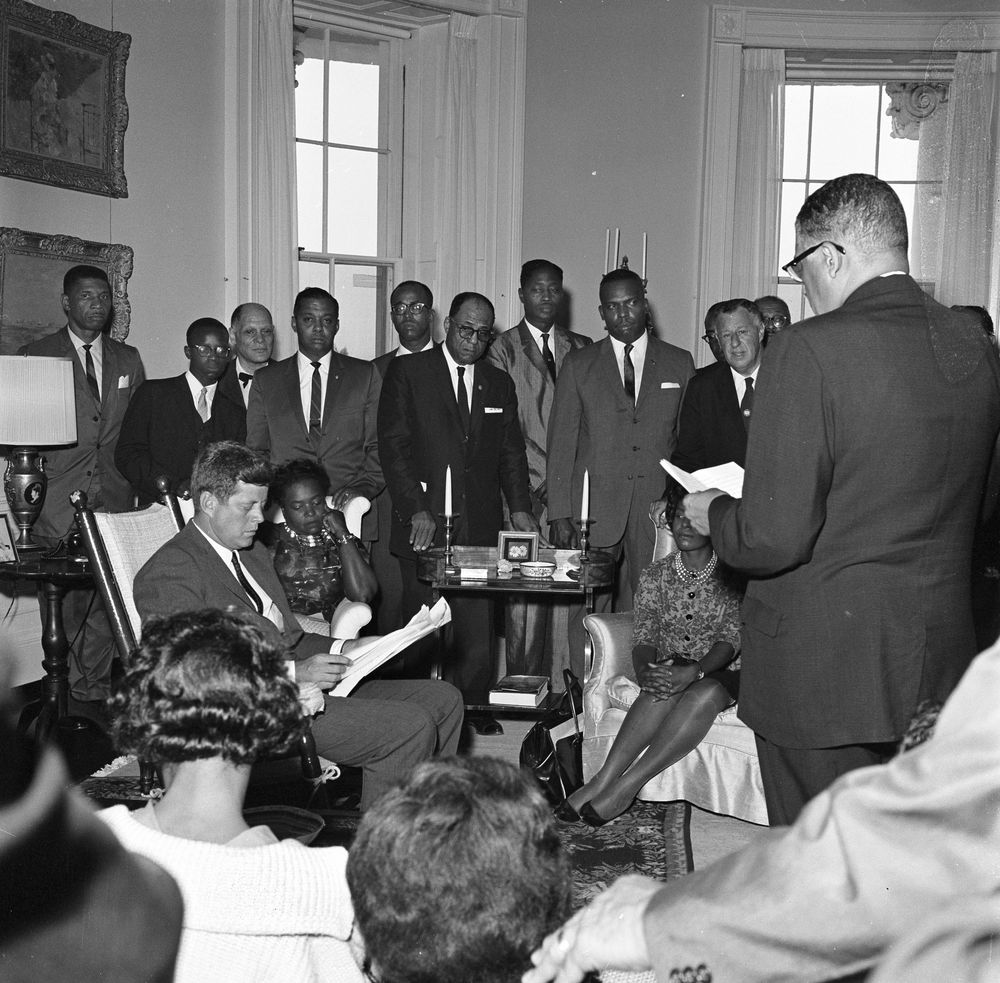
President John F. Kennedy meets with representatives from the National Association for the Advancement of Colored People (NAACP).

Kaplan joined the National Association for the Advancement of Colored People (NAACP) in 1932 and was elected to the National Board in 1954. In 1966, he was elected its President and held that post until his death. As president, Kaplan spoke throughout the United States on the organization's behalf and sought financial contributions. Kaplan was a trustee of two black colleges, Lincoln University and Tougaloo College, and treasurer of The Crisis magazine.

== Philanthropic activities ==
Kaplan was also involved in Jewish affairs and was a member of the Board of Trustees of the Union of American Hebrew Congregations. He contributed substantial sums of money to the Jewish Memorial Hospital in Boston and Brandeis University. He received numerous awards and honorary degrees, including the Amistad Award of the American Missionary Association and honorary degrees from Wilberforce University, Hebrew Union College, and Lincoln University.

== Personal life ==
He and his wife, Emily, fought for civil rights for all. He was one in a long line of American Jews who held a leadership role in African American civil rights groups.

== Bibliography ==
- S. Norman Feingold and William B. Silverman, Kivie Kaplan: A Legend in His Own Time, Union of American Hebrew Congregations, 1976, ISBN 0-8074-0006-8.
