= Roslyn Brock =

American businessman and activist

Chair of the National Association for the Advancement of Colored People
- In office 2010–2017
- Preceded by: Julian Bond
- Succeeded by: Leon W. Russell

Personal details
- Born: Roslyn McCallister; May 30, 1965 (age 59); Fort Pierce, Florida, U.S.
- Spouse: Randall Brock (died 1995)
- Education: Virginia Union University (BS, MDiv); George Washington University (MHA); Northwestern University (MBA)

Roslyn McCallister Brock (born May 30, 1965) is an African-American civil rights leader, healthcare executive, and health activist. She was selected to succeed Julian Bond as chairman of the National Association for the Advancement of Colored People on February 20, 2010, becoming the fourth woman and the youngest person to serve in the position.

== Early life and education ==
Brock was born in 1965 in Fort Pierce, Florida. She received her bachelor's degree from Virginia Union University, graduating magna cum laude in 1987. She also earned three master's degrees: the first in healthcare administration from George Washington University in 1989, the second in business administration from the Kellogg School of Management at Northwestern University in 1999, and the third in divinity from the Samuel DeWitt Proctor School of Theology at Virginia Union University in 2009.

== Career ==
Brock worked for ten years in healthcare management at the W. K. Kellogg Foundation in Battle Creek, Michigan. She has served as the vice-president of Advocacy and Government Relations for Bon Secours Health System in Marriottsville, Maryland.

=== NAACP involvement ===
Brock joined the NAACP in 1984 as a freshman at Virginia Union University, and she was named a Youth Board Member the following year. Her 1989 master's thesis, under the supervision of NAACP executive director Benjamin Hooks, was entitled "Developing a NAACP Health Outreach Program for Minorities". Beginning in 1991, she initiated health symposia at the annual NAACP National Conventions. She also served as Vice Chairman of the NAACP Health Committee. She was appointed Chair of the Convention Planning Committee in 1999.

In February 2001, aged 35, she was unanimously elected Vice Chairman of the NAACP National Board of Directors. She was the youngest person named to the position and the first woman to serve.

Julian Bond, who had served as NAACP Chairman from 1998, stayed on in the position through 2009 as the organization celebrated its 100th anniversary. Brock was chosen as Bond's successor on February 20, 2010, at the age of 44. She is the youngest person ever to serve as NAACP Chairman.

== Memberships ==
Brock is a member of the Board of Trustees of The George Washington University, and past chair of the Board of Advisors of the Milken Institute School of Public Health at The George Washington University, as well as being a member of the Kellogg School of Management Global Advisory Board at Northwestern University, and Interfaith Center for Corporate Responsibility (ICCR), the American Public Health Association and Alpha Kappa Alpha sorority.

== Personal life ==
Brock was married to Randall Eugene Brock, who died in 1995. She currently resides in Elkridge, Maryland.
