= Stephen J. Spingarn =

American lawyer

Commissioner of the Federal Trade Commission
- In office October 25, 1950 – September 25, 1953
- President: Harry S. Truman; Dwight D. Eisenhower

Personal details
- Born: September 1, 1908 Bedford, New York
- Died: August 6, 1984 (aged 75)

Stephen J. Spingarn (September 1, 1908 – August 6, 1984) was a mid-20th-century American lawyer and civil servant in the Franklin Delano Roosevelt, Harry S. Truman, and (briefly) Dwight D. Eisenhower administrations, including Special Counsel (1949) and Administrative Assistant to Truman (1950) and lastly commissioner on the Federal Trade Commission (1950–1953) during the transition to the Eisenhower administration.

Writings on the mid-20th-Century often cite his official writings during office; less often, they describe him in text.

== Background ==
Stephen Joel Spingarn was born on September 1, 1908, in Bedford, New York. His father, Joel Elias Spingarn, was a professor of comparative literature at Columbia University, co-founder of Harcourt, Brace & Co., Republican Party supporter who ran for Congress in New York with an endorsement from President Theodore Roosevelt, and later chairman of the board of the NAACP. His uncle was Arthur B. Spingarn (1878-1971). Lewis Mumford was a close family friend: he bought their family home in Leedsville, New York.

He attended Phillips Exeter Academy. He started studies at Yale University but, after working summers as a U.S. National Park ranger in the Mesa Verde National Park, decided to stay West and settled on the University of Arizona in Tucson, where he graduated in the mid-1930s and passed the Arizona State Bar.

== Career ==
Spingarn served three presidential administrations from 1934 to 1953.

Under Roosevelt in the New Deal, he served as an attorney in the U.S. Treasury (1934–1941): "In '36, I was a young Treasury lawyer, a legislative lawyer." He also served as assistant to U.S. Attorney General Homer Stille Cummings (1937–38). He became special assistant to the general counsel at Treasury (1941-1942).

In January 1941, while working as a lawyer for the Department of the Treasury, Spingarn and his colleague Ernest Feidler wrote the original draft of the bill which would later become Lend-Lease.

During World War II, he served as a colonel in the 5th Army Counter Intelligence Corps (1943-1945). He later recalled:

I was a counterespionage officer during the war and I was commanding officer of the 5th Army Counter Intelligence Corps for two years, from the end of the African and throughout the Italian campaign. I was in the Salerno invasion, I was at Anzio and at Cassino and at many other places, and while I was not a combat officer I saw a lot of people get killed, close by. We went into new cities with the assault troops and did the initial counterintelligence work, grabbing the human targets of whom we had advance information, and trying to grab the documents too, at the intelligence centers and places like that, and other things. And we captured, the counterintelligence personnel at 5th Army in the Italian Campaign, captured approximately 525 German spies and saboteurs. They were mostly Italians, but they were working for the German intelligence services, Abwehr and SD, which I believe is more than any other allied army captured during World War II. I don't have any figures on the Russians, but as far as I know it was better than any of the Western allies, and we often modestly stated that it was more than the FBI had caught in the whole forty years of its history.

Later, he wrote articles for the Saturday Evening Post about these exploits.

In 1946, after the war, he returned to Treasury as assistant general counsel (1946-1949), which meant operatively as legislative counsel on the non-tax side. He helped write a 1937 Anti-Smuggling Act. He was also legal counsel to the U.S. Secret Service and coordinator of Treasury enforcement agencies (a committee of the six heads of the enforcement bureaus, with Spingarn as legal member).

He served on President Truman's Temporary Commission on Employment Loyalty (1946 – 1947), about which he said later:

I had been the principal 'borer inner' at the meetings of the Loyalty Commission. I had tried to get J. Edgar Hoover before the Commission. I had prepared a list of questions for Hoover. My thesis had been, then, that before the Loyalty Commission comes up with a program we ought to know how big a war this is. Is it a one division war, a five division war, or a twenty division war. We therefore need to know the real facts, the secret information of the Department of Justice, on how widely infected with subversives, they believed, the Government is. Facts, not speculation – facts.

He also served as Deputy Director in the Office of Contract Settlement (1947 – 49).

I know I made some enemies in this process, by boring in. That I assume was one reason that Tom Clark was not prepared to tell me and even aside from that frankly I doubt if there's anybody more prima donnish than intelligence people – and in this capacity, the Attorney General is an intelligence guy, dealing with an intelligence function. This has been my experience everywhere. Every intelligence man with information won't give it to anyone else. That's one of the troubles. It was true in the war, you know. We spent more time fighting each other sometimes than we did the enemy, really.

In Spring 1948, Spingarn questioned former Soviet spy Whittaker Chambers for one or two hours about Harry Dexter White:

Whittaker Chambers had had something to say on the subject, but I don't believe that he ever met Harry White either. Actually, Whittaker Chambers said later, and he told me this, because I interrogated him once in '48, I think it was, '47 or '48, one or the other. I interrogated Whittaker Chambers up in New York in the offices of Time magazine about these Treasury cases, and as I recall he told me that he didn't believe Harry White was a Communist; he believed that he was a man who thought he was smarter than the Communists, and he could use them, but really they used him. That was just about the way that Whittaker Chambers expressed it to me, as I recall it. And when I said "me," it was also to Mal Harney – Malachi L. Harney – who was then the chief coordinator of Treasury Enforcement activity. There was a Treasury Enforcement Coordination Committee, and I was the legal member of that committee...
And Chambers said he had never met this man, but there was one reference, way back, in the thirties, to a name, which was unusual, a first name, mind you, an unusual name, that someone had said to Chambers that there was a fellow with this unusual first name in the Treasury, who was one of ours, a Communist. A very tenuous, thin thing, not even a last name just a first name, and this was – now we're talking about events ten years or more later, you see.

On August 3, 1948, Chambers would appear under subpoena before HUAC and name White among more than half a dozen former federal officials as part of the Ware Group ring he ran. He provided details about his meetings with White, also included in his 1952 memoir, Witness. Among those named was also Alger Hiss (friend of Max Lowenthal – see below.) Having submitted three articles written for the Saturday Evening Post with journalist Milton Lehman on "How We Caught Spies" during World War II, Spingarn had New York City Mayor Bill O'Dwyer and producer Ray Stark, help him pitch his articles for a movie in Hollywood. Leaving Washington as the Hiss Case started, Spingarn landed meetings Buddy Adler at Columbia Studios, Sam Briskin at Paramount Studios, and Armand Deutsch at MGM Studios but failed to close a deal. In early September, President Truman's secretary called him to come home and work on the presidential election.

In 1949, Spingarn became Special Counsel to the President. In 1950, he became Administrative Assistant to the President. In 1950, he became a commissioner of the Federal Trade Commission (FTC), where he served until 1953.

After leaving government service, in 1956 he served on the Small Business Advisory Committee of the Democratic National Committee.

In 1967, during an oral history interview with Jerry N. Hess of the Truman Library, he said that rival Truman associates Max Lowenthal and Matthew J. Connelly "knifed him":

Max Lowenthal was a good friend of the President's from the days in the '30s... They became friends at that time, and he had total access to the White House. During the McCarthy period he was there all the time, almost daily; he used to hang out in Matt Connelly's rear office. I had had an encounter early in my White House career with Max Lowenthal. Clark Clifford told me that Max was worried about an Internal Security bill (of 1950).

However, Spingarn also suspected that Lowenthal (and Connelly) "stuck the knife in me." Phileo Nash told Spingarn it was Connelly, influenced by Lowenthal:

I mentioned that Max Lowenthal had once told Niles, and possibly others that I was a Fa[s]cist, that was in 1949, because I told Lowenthal I favored wiretapping under proper controls... Nash said it was quite possible that Max Lowenthal was very vindictive, and he mentioned that Max Lowenthal is currently spending much time in Matt’s office with L’s son.

Spingarn further recalled:

There was an operation run, more or less, under the supervision of Max Lowenthal in the basement of the White House which was to prepare answers to the charges that McCarthy was hurling so freely during all that period and get them ready in a hurry, not wait until the lie had gone around the world before the truth has gotten its pants on. I remember Herb Maletz–good man–worked in that thing and one or two others whose names I can't remember at the moment.
Max Lowenthal was very much involved in that, and in his book The Truman Presidency, Cabell Phillips has me teamed up with Max Lowenthal in running that operation, which is not correct. I did an awful lot of work on the McCarthy stuff, but I did it in terms of trying to devise some machinery, or system, or operation.

== Personal life and death ==
Truman held Spingarn in high regard, as evinced by his letter to him dated December 29, 1952, which opens "You are performing a public service..." even as both the president and Spingarn were readying to leave office in the advent of the new Eisenhower administration.

Spingarn died on August 6, 1984.

== See also ==
- Joel Elias Spingarn
- Arthur B. Spingarn
- List of former FTC commissioners
- New Deal

== External sources ==
- Marist University: FDR Library Digital Collection: Stephen J. Spingarn Papers, 1943-1969
