= Leon W. Russell =

American human rights activist

Leon Russell
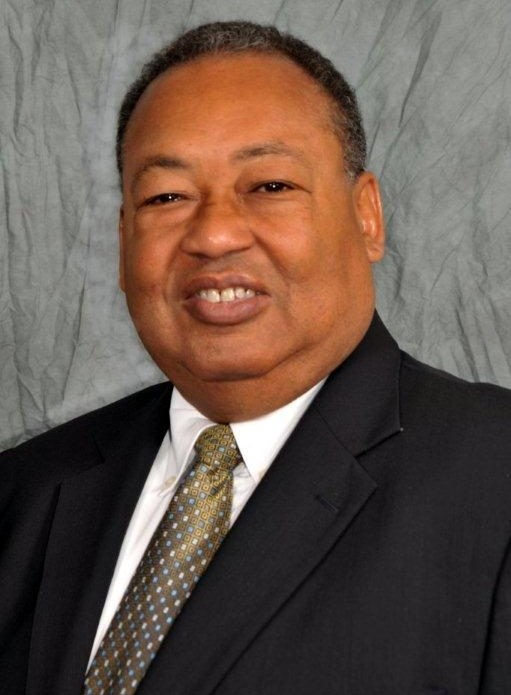

Chair of the National Association for the Advancement of Colored People
- Incumbent
- Assumed office February 18, 2017
- Preceded by: Roslyn Brock

Personal details
- Born: 1949 or 1950 (age 76–77)

Leon W. Russell (born 1949/1950) is an American civil rights leader and human rights executive. He was elected to succeed Roslyn Brock as chairman of the National Association for the Advancement of Colored People board of directors on February 18, 2017.

== Professional career ==
Russell spent nearly four decades as the Director of the Office of Human Rights for Pinellas County in Clearwater, Florida, retiring in 2012. For his contributions to the improvement of equality and equity across the United States, Russell has received numerous civic awards and citations.

== NAACP ==
Russell has spent over four decades in various leadership capacities with the NAACP. Under his leadership, the NAACP has taken on environmental and climate justice as civil and human rights issues. In 2023, Russell presented Congressman Bennie Thompson with the NAACP Image Award – Chairman's Award. In 2022, Russell presented Samuel L. Jackson with the NAACP Image Award – Chairman's Award. In 2021, He presented Rev. James Lawson with the NAACP Image Award – Chairman's Award. Russell presented the NAACP Image Award – Chairman's Award to congressman John Lewis in 2020. Russell believes in the well-being of America's children, serving on various boards to ensure their rights are protected. He led a campaign, with the assistance of former National presidents of the NAACP, to focus on bringing young adults into the organization to change the mindset of how people view the NAACP. As Chairman of the NAACP National board of directors, Russell is charged with setting policy for the National NAACP President and CEO to implement. He outlined the strategy in 2017. He spent time in Ohio urging young adults to get engaged in the Civil Rights movement.
