= Ernest R. Feidler =

US Coast Guard admiral (1910–1976)

Ernest R. Feidler was a rear admiral and Judge Advocate General of the United States Coast Guard.

== Biography ==
A native of Superior, Wisconsin, Ernest Reynold Feidler was born on April 15, 1910. He graduated from the University of Wisconsin Law School in 1934 and shortly thereafter took a faculty position at Yale Law School. Working as a lawyer for the Department of the Treasury, Feidler and his colleague Stephen Spingarn wrote the original draft of the bill which would later become Lend-Lease.

After joining the Coast Guard, Feidler served in the Mediterranean Theater and the North African campaign of World War II. He later also served during the Korean War and was named as the acting Judge Advocate General of the Coast Guard. Among his other assignments was being the Coast Guard aide to U.S. Treasury Secretaries John Wesley Snyder and George M. Humphrey.

Feidler retired from the military in 1970 as the highest-ranking member of the United States Coast Guard Reserve. As a civilian, he was an official at the United States Department of the Treasury in a variety of other capacities. In addition, he was the Secretary and the General Consul of the National Gallery of Art.

Feidler died on September 4, 1976, in Arlington, Virginia. He had married Lydia Keown in 1936, and she died in 1994. The couple are buried together at Arlington National Cemetery.
