= Arthur B. Spingarn =

American civil rights activist (1878–1971)

Arthur Spingarn

President of the National Association for the Advancement of Colored People
- In office 1940–1965
- Preceded by: Joel Elias Spingarn
- Succeeded by: Kivie Kaplan

Personal details
- Born: Arthur Barnette Spingarn; March 28, 1878 New York City, New York, U.S.
- Died: December 1, 1971 (aged 93) New York City, New York, U.S.
- Relatives: Joel Elias Spingarn (brother); Stephen Spingarn (nephew)
- Education: Columbia University (BA, LLB)

Arthur Barnette Spingarn (March 28, 1878 – December 1, 1971) was an American leader in the fight for civil rights for African Americans.

== Early life ==
He was born into a well-to-do Jewish family. His older brother was the educator Joel Elias Spingarn, and his nephew was Federal Trade Commission Commissioner Stephen J. Spingarn.

He graduated from Columbia College in 1897 and from Columbia Law School in 1899.

== Career ==
Spingarn was one of the few White Americans who decided in the 1900s decade to support the radical demands for racial justice being voiced by W. E. B. Du Bois, in contrast to the gradualist views of Booker T. Washington. He served as head of the legal committee of the National Association for the Advancement of Colored People (NAACP) and was one of its vice presidents from 1911.

He interrupted his legal career to serve for several years as a United States Army captain in the Sanitary Corps during World War I and protested racial discrimination treatment of African Americans in the US military. He was very interested in furthering the cause of civil rights and improving the condition of black Americans. He succeeded his brother, Joel, as president of the NAACP in 1940 when the legal arm of the organization was spun off into the NAACP Legal Defense and Educational Fund and served as the NAACP's president until 1965.

== Collector ==
Spingarn avidly amassed collections. One of them was of books, newspapers, and manuscripts on the black American experience worldwide that was "unique in its depth, breadth, and quality." He sold it to Howard University, where it was incorporated into the renamed Moorland-Spingarn Research Center, the largest and most valuable research library in America for the study of black life and history.

His other collections were sold at auction in 1966.

== Death and legacy ==
He died at home in New York City on December 1, 1971. At his memorial service, he was eulogized by Associate Supreme Court Justice Thurgood Marshall and Roy Wilkins, executive director of the NAACP. Buell C. Gallagher, retired president of the City College of New York, called him "the rallying center of the aggressive forward movement" of the NAACP.

== Works ==
- Laws Relating to Sex Morality in New York City (1915, revised 1926)
- Legal and Protective Measures (1950), co-authored with Jacob A. Goldberg

== Sources ==
- New York Times: Farnsworth Fowle, "Arthur Spingarn of N.A.A.C.P. Is Dead", December 2, 1971
- Francis H Thompson, Arthur Barnett Spingarn: Advocate for Black Rights (1987)
- Patricia Sullivan, Lift Every Voice: The NAACP and the Making of the Civil Rights Movement (2009)
