= Milton Lehman =

20th-century American journalist and biographer

- Born: 1917; Pittsburgh, Pennsylvania
- Died: October 13, 1966 (aged 48–49); Rockville, Maryland
- Education: University of Pittsburgh
- Alma mater: Columbia University
- Occupations: journalist, biographer
- Spouse: Mildred Lehman
- Children: three
- Writing career
- Notable work: This High Man: The Life of Robert H. Goddard (1963)

Milton Lehman (1917–1966) was an American freelance journalist and book author, best known for his 1963 biography of rocket scientist Robert Goddard.

== Background ==
Milton Lehman was born in 1917 in Pittsburgh. He attended the University of Pittsburgh as an undergraduate and completed a master's in journalism at Columbia University.

== Career ==
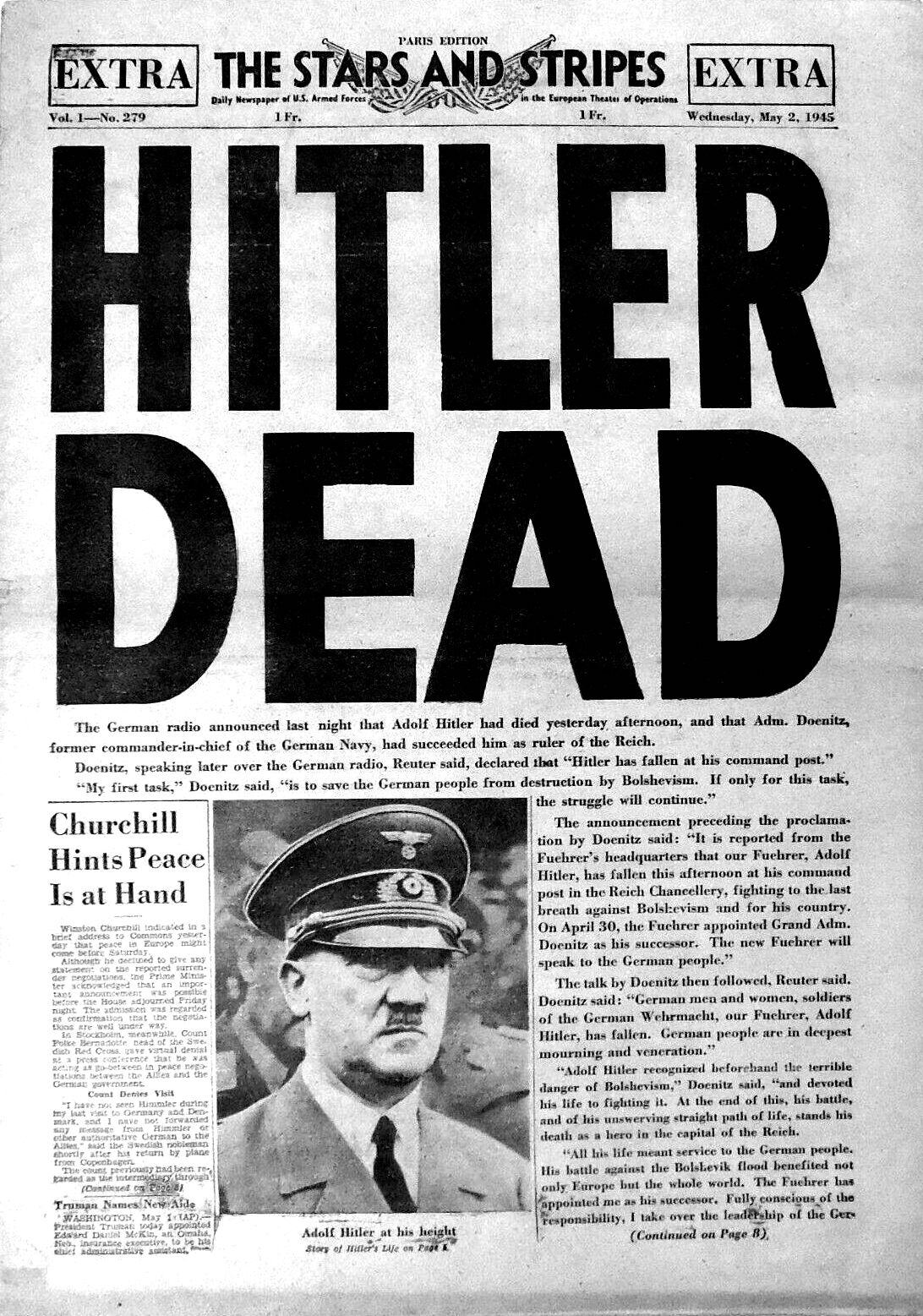
Lehman worked in WW2 for Stars and Stripes (here, May 2, 1945, cover on Hitler's death)

Lehman served as a "special assistant" to Francis Keppel, former United States Commissioner of Education. In the early 1940s, he served as a "special assistant" to the late Eric Johnston when he was president of the Motion Picture Association of America.

During World War II, Lehman served as an Army combat correspondent for the Mediterranean edition of Stars and Stripes newspaper.

In 1948, Lehman co-wrote a three-part article for the Saturday Evening Post with Stephen J. Spingarn about Spingarn's time in the war as a colonel in the 5th Army Counter Intelligence Corps (1943–1945).

In 1963, Lehman published the first biography of rocket scientist Robert Goddard, for which aviator Charles A. Lindbergh wrote a preface.

When he died, Lehman was serving as a writer and editor for the United States Department of Health, Education and Welfare.

== Personal life and death ==
Lehman married Mildred Kharfen, a fellow journalist; they had three children.

Milton Lehman died age 48 on October 13, 1966, of a heart attack at his home in Rockville, Maryland; he was buried in Pittsburgh.

== Works ==
Lehman wrote about Robert Goddard (here, with launching frame of 1st liquid-fueled rocket – March 16, 1926)

Lehman wrote some 250 articles, contributed to national magazines including the Saturday Evening Post, Reader's Digest, Look, and New York Times.

Books:

- This High Man: The Life of Robert H. Goddard (1963)
- Republished as Robert H. Goddard: Pioneer of Space Research (1963)

Articles:

- "Smallpox, the Killer That Stalks New York," Cosmopolitan (1948)
- "The White House Shudders," Collier's Weekly (November 13, 1948)
- "How We Caught Spies in World War II" (three parts), Saturday Evening Post (November 27, December 4, December 12, 1948)

== Legacy ==
Milton's papers concerning Robert Goddard reside in the archives of Clark University in Worcester, Massachusetts.

== See also ==
- Robert Goddard
