= Chicago Better Housing Association =

Housing organization to counter discrimination in housing in the US

The Chicago Better Housing Association (CBHA) is an open housing organization created in the 1950s to counter discrimination in the allocation of housing in the United States. The group campaigned for open housing legislation, and later planned and commissioned several affordable housing schemes and other improvements in the Chicago area.

== History ==
CBHA was founded as part of the fledgling civil rights movement that followed the Brown v. Board of Education decision by the Supreme Court in 1954. It was created by a coalition of civil rights groups including the National Association for the Advancement of Colored People (NAACP), Congress of Racial Equality (CORE) and advocates for equal housing.

Later in the early 1960s, the group joined forces with the Southern Christian Leadership Conference (SCLC), headed by Dr. Martin Luther King Jr., the Chicago Chapter of the NAACP, headed by the Rev. Herbert C. Martin, and the local black church community, and Operation Breadbasket to push for legislation for open housing. When federal and state open housing legislation was passed, they were one of the groups that worked with the Equal Employment Opportunity Commission (EEOC), the local successor to the SCLC which after Dr King's death became Operation PUSH, along with CORE and the NAACP, and the Lawyers' Committee for Civil Rights Under Law, to provide "testers" to trap unwary and unscrupulous landlords and real estate firms that block busting and were steering blacks, Hispanics and Asians away from or to certain neighborhoods.

After a ruling in the early 1990s by the Supreme Court making it harder for testers to be used as a weapon against civil rights violations, and after the cumulative effect of 12 years of conservative, anti-civil rights judges being appointed to the federal courts by the Reagan and Bush (Snr.) administrations, the CBHA shifted its focus away from litigation and toward the development of affordable housing and redevelopment work in blighted underprivileged communities.

The CBHA gained recent momentum with a $100,000 Illinois housing grant from the Department of Economic Commerce and Economic Opportunity (DECO) to create a botanic garden out of a vacant lot in South Side Englewood as a demonstration project. The CBHA was subsequently awarded an additional $20,000 supplemental in 2007 at the request of then Illinois State Senator Barack Obama. Those awards were to be part of a broader plan that did not involve state money that was to encompass a 12-block area that was going to create neighbor space along an elevated train line which would have involved the construction of up 50 townhouses along with bike paths, light shopping, park areas, etc. The plan failed to materialize fully when federal funds were diverted to the second Gulf War and budget deficits soared due to war-time efforts.

The "Englewood Botanic Garden Project" involving the one city block development also became the subject of political controversy since it involved then State Senator and the eventually US Senator and then US Presidential Candidate Barack Obama, and the volunteer who had agreed to see the project through to the end, a former Englewood resident, Kenny Smith. Smith worked with his cousin in the automobile repossession business for a time. As announced at a January 2000 news conference at Englewood High School. The garden, which only involved one city block, was eventually to be part of a broader federal program that eventually would lead to the development of "an oasis of trees and paths" instead of a series of debris-filled lots and this particular vacant lot full of weeds and garbage under the Chicago "L" mass transit tracks. The state grant was for this one-block area where a gazebo and park area was to be constructed as part of a larger and more ambitious plan that did not involve state funding which was to consist of trees and paths to run between 59th Place and 62nd Place. Organizers promised to raise $1.1 million for that and similar lots. The garden site is situated near where Smith was developing affordable housing.

The Chicago Sun-Times, acting on information fed to them by political operatives of Senator John McCain, and the Illinois Green Association which was actually the Illinois Nurserymens' Association, a for-profit lobby group run by a former industry lobbyist, encouraged the Sun-Times to run a series of stories claiming that the Chicago Better Housing Association didn't do any work for the grant money except getting paid for it. In fact, the work they were paid for was done. The Sun-Times article carried a number of false claims in it that were disproven by pictures and documents and still they refused to retract the previous articles. Instead, they reran the early articles in the subsequent stories repeating the false claims when they knew better the second and third times through.

The CBHA sued the Sun-Times and its parent corporation, Hollinger International, for libel, claiming the information in the published articles is false. Claims have also been filed against the New York Daily News and Illinois Green. The claim stated that the work was done and the proof was submitted to the state and municipal agencies showing invoices, progress photos and paid checks. However, even after the CBHA demanded a retraction, after showing the reporters proof that their story contained false statements, the Sun-Times not only re-ran the story (twice subsequently) but also expanded on it. The lawsuit had to be dropped because the Sun-Times declared bankruptcy so all lawsuits against it were enjoined by the bankruptcy court. The CBHA resolved its claims against the Daily News which, as part of the settlement, published a retraction.

== Affordable housing ==
On November 7, 2002, the City of Chicago Empowerment Zone/Enterprise Community Coordinating Council voted and recommended to Mayor Richard M. Daley to award a grant of $250,000 to the CBHA for the purpose of constructing new single-family and "two-flat" homes in the Englewood district of Chicago, as part of an Enterprise Community Zone. The homes were to be constructed in the area "bounded by Princeton Avenue on the east, Stewart Avenue on the west, 61st Street on the south and 59th Place on the north. These were Community Development Block Grant funds, and were part of an effort to construct up to 50 homes. A dozen units were built before construction of new housing collapsed in 2008 due to the lending crisis caused by mortgage lending in the subprime markets.

== Campaign 2008 ==
Some individuals made note during the campaign of the association between Democratic Presidential Candidate Barack Obama and the CBHA. This association is in dispute, despite the reporting from the Chicago Sun-Times.
