= NAACP =

American civil rights organization

National Association for the Advancement of Colored People
- Abbreviation: NAACP
- Formation: February 12, 1909; 117 years ago
- Founders: W. E. B. Du Bois; Mary White Ovington; Moorfield Storey; Ida B. Wells; Lillian Wald; Henry Moskowitz
- Tax ID no.: 38-4108034
- Legal status: 501(c)(4) Civic Leagues and Social Welfare Organizations
- Headquarters: Baltimore, Maryland, U.S.
- Members: 300,000
- Chairman: Leon W. Russell
- President and CEO: Derrick Johnson
- Main organ: Board of directors
- Publication: The Crisis
- Budget: $24,800,000 (2019)
- Website: www.naacp.org

The National Association for the Advancement of Colored People (NAACP) (Note: NAACP is usually pronounced "N-double-A-C-P.") is an American civil rights organization formed in 1909 as an interracial endeavor to advance justice for African Americans by a group including W. E. B. Du Bois, Mary White Ovington, Moorfield Storey, Ida B. Wells, Lillian Wald, Emil G. Hirsch and Henry Moskowitz. Over the years, leaders of the organization have included Thurgood Marshall and Roy Wilkins. The NAACP is the largest and oldest civil rights group in the United States of America.

Its mission in the 21st century is "to ensure the political, educational, social, and economic equality of rights of all persons and to eliminate race-based discrimination". NAACP initiatives include political lobbying, publicity efforts, and litigation strategies developed by its legal team. The group enlarged its mission in the late 20th century by considering issues such as police misconduct, the status of black foreign refugees and questions of economic development. Its name, retained in accordance with tradition, uses the once common term colored people, referring to those with some African ancestry. The NAACP publishes a quarterly magazine, The Crisis. Du Bois was the magazine's editor for the first 24 years, starting in 1910.

The NAACP bestows annual awards on African Americans in three categories: Image Awards are for achievements in the arts and media, Theatre Awards are for achievements in theatre and stage, and Spingarn Medals are for outstanding achievements of any kind. Its headquarters are in Baltimore, Maryland.

== Organization ==
The NAACP is headquartered in Baltimore, with additional regional offices in New York, Michigan, Georgia, Maryland, Texas, Colorado, and California. Each regional office is responsible for coordinating the efforts of state conferences in that region. Local, youth, and college chapters organize activities for individual members.

In the U.S., the NAACP is administered by a 64-member board led by a chairperson. The board elects one person as the president and one as the chief executive officer for the organization. Julian Bond, civil rights movement activist and former Georgia State Senator, was chairman until replaced in February 2010 by healthcare administrator Roslyn Brock. For decades in the first half of the 20th century, the organization was effectively led by its executive secretary, who acted as chief operating officer. James Weldon Johnson and Walter F. White, who served in that role successively from 1920 to 1958, were much more widely known as NAACP leaders than were presidents during those years.

The organization has never had a woman president, except on a temporary basis, and there have been calls to name one. Lorraine C. Miller served as interim president after Benjamin Jealous stepped down. Maya Wiley was rumored to be in line for the position in 2013, but Cornell William Brooks was selected.

Departments within the NAACP govern areas of action. Local chapters are supported by the "Branch and Field Services" department and the "Youth and College" department. The "Legal" department focuses on court cases of broad application to minorities, such as systematic discrimination in employment, government, or education. The Washington, D.C., bureau is responsible for lobbying the U.S. government, and the Education Department works to improve public education at the local, state, and federal levels. The goal of the Health Division is to advance health care for minorities through public policy initiatives and education.

As of 2007, the NAACP had approximately 425,000 paying and non-paying members.

The NAACP's non-current records are housed at the Library of Congress, which has served as the organization's official repository since 1964. The records held there comprise approximately five million items spanning the NAACP's history from the time of its founding until 2003. In 2011, the NAACP teamed with the digital repository ProQuest to digitize and host online the earlier portion of its archives, through 1972 – nearly two million pages of documents, from the national, legal, and branch offices throughout the country, which offer first-hand insight into the organization's work related to such crucial issues as lynching, school desegregation, and discrimination in all its aspects (in the military, the criminal justice system, employment, housing).

== Predecessor: The Niagara Movement ==
The Pan-American Exposition of 1901 in Buffalo, New York, featured many American innovations and achievements, but also included a disparaging caricature of slave life in the South as well as a depiction of life in Africa, called "Old Plantation" and "Darkest Africa", respectively. A local African-American woman, Mary Talbert of Ohio, was appalled by the exhibit, as a similar one in Paris highlighted black achievements. She informed W. E. B. Du Bois of the situation, and a coalition began to form.

In 1905, a group of thirty-two prominent African-American leaders met to discuss the challenges facing African Americans and possible strategies and solutions. They were particularly concerned by the Southern states' disenfranchisement of blacks starting with Mississippi's passage of a new constitution in 1890. Through 1908, Southern legislatures, dominated by white Southern Democrats, ratified new constitutions and laws creating barriers to voter registration and more complex election rules. In practice, this and the Lily-white movement caused the exclusion of most blacks and many poor whites from the political system in southern states. Black voter registration and turnout dropped markedly in the South as a result of such legislation. Men who had been voting for thirty years in the South were told they did not "qualify" to register. White-dominated legislatures also passed segregation and Jim Crow laws.

The first meeting was held at the Erie Beach Hotel on the Canadian side of the Niagara River in Fort Erie, Ontario. As a result, the group came to be known as the Niagara Movement. A year later, three non-African-Americans joined the group: journalist William English Walling, a wealthy socialist; and social workers Mary White Ovington and Henry Moskowitz. Moskowitz, who was Jewish, was then also Associate Leader of the New York Society for Ethical Culture. They met in 1906 at Storer College, Harpers Ferry, West Virginia, and in 1907 in Boston, Massachusetts.

The fledgling group struggled for a time with limited resources and internal conflict and disbanded in 1910. Seven of the members of the Niagara Movement joined the Board of Directors of the NAACP, founded in 1909. Although both organizations shared membership and overlapped for a time, the Niagara Movement was a separate organization. Historically, it is considered to have had a more radical platform than the NAACP. The Niagara Movement was formed exclusively by African Americans. Four European Americans were among the founders of the NAACP, they included Mary White Ovington, Henry Moskowitz, William English Walling and Oswald Garrison Villard.

== History ==
=== Formation ===
The Race Riot of 1908 in Springfield, Illinois, the state capital and Abraham Lincoln's hometown, was a catalyst showing the urgent need for an effective civil rights organization in the U.S. In the decades around the turn of the century, the rate of lynchings of blacks, particularly men, was at an all-time high. Mary White Ovington, journalist William English Walling and Henry Moskowitz met in New York City in January 1909 to work on organizing for black civil rights. They sent out solicitations for support to more than 60 prominent Americans, and set a meeting date for February 12, 1909. This was intended to coincide with the 100th anniversary of the birth of President Abraham Lincoln, who emancipated enslaved African Americans. While the first large meeting did not occur until three months later, the February date is often cited as the organization's founding date.

The NAACP was founded on February 12, 1909, by a larger group including African Americans W. E. B. Du Bois, Ida B. Wells, Archibald Grimké, Mary Church Terrell, and the previously named whites Henry Moskowitz, Mary White Ovington, William English Walling (the wealthy Socialist son of a former slave-holding family), Florence Kelley, a social reformer and friend of Du Bois; Oswald Garrison Villard, and Charles Edward Russell, a renowned muckraker and close friend of Walling. Russell helped plan the NAACP and had served as acting chairman of the National Negro Committee (1909), a forerunner to the NAACP.

On May 30, 1909, the Niagara Movement conference took place at New York City's Henry Street Settlement House; they created an organization of more than 40, identifying as the National Negro Committee. Among other founding members were Lillian Wald, a nurse who had founded the Henry Street Settlement where the conference took place.

Du Bois played a key role in organizing the event and presided over the proceedings. Also in attendance was Ida B. Wells-Barnett, an African-American journalist and anti-lynching crusader. Wells-Barnett addressed the conference on the history of lynching in the United States and called for action to publicize and prosecute such crimes. The members chose the new organization's name to be the National Association for the Advancement of Colored People and elected its first officers:

- National President: Moorfield Storey of Boston
- Chairman of the executive committee: William English Walling
- Treasurer: John E. Milholland, a prominent New York Republican
- Disbursing Treasurer: Oswald Garrison Villard
- Executive Secretary, Frances Blascoer
- Director of Publicity and Research, W. E. B. Du Bois.

The NAACP was incorporated a year later in 1911. The association's charter expressed its mission:

To promote equality of rights and eradicate caste or race prejudice among citizens of the United States; to advance the interest of colored citizens; to secure for them impartial suffrage; and to increase their opportunities for securing justice in the courts, education for their children, employment according to their ability, and complete equality before the law.

The larger conference resulted in a more diverse organization, where the leadership was predominantly white. Moorfield Storey, a white attorney from a Boston abolitionist family, served as the president of the NAACP from its founding to 1915. At its founding, the NAACP had one African American on its executive board, Du Bois. Storey was a long-time classical liberal and Grover Cleveland Democrat who advocated laissez-faire free markets, the gold standard, and anti-imperialism. Storey consistently and aggressively championed civil rights, not only for blacks but also for Native Americans and immigrants (he opposed immigration restrictions). Du Bois continued to play a pivotal leadership role in the organization, serving as editor of the association's magazine, The Crisis, which had a circulation of more than 30,000.

The Crisis was used both for news reporting and for publishing African-American poetry and literature. During the organization's campaigns against lynching, Du Bois encouraged the writing and performance of plays and other expressive literature about this issue.

=== Involvement of members of Jewish Community ===
In addition to Henry Moskowitz the Jewish community contributed greatly to the NAACP's founding and continued financing. Julius Rosenwald, the founder and president of Sears Roebuck and Company and board member of the Tuskegee Institute, contributed several thousand dollars in the early days. He arranged for the 1912 meeting in Chicago to be held at his synagogue, Temple Sinai and spoke at the opening. Later the Rosenwald Fund contributed over thirty thousand dollars for legal defense and education.

Jewish historian Howard Sachar's book A History of Jews in America notes "In 1914, Professor Emeritus Joel Spingarn of Columbia University became chairman of the NAACP and recruited for its board such Jewish leaders as Jacob Schiff, Jacob Billikopf, and Rabbi Stephen Wise." Jewish attorneys and activists were involved in legal cases and many Jews were involved in the Civil Rights movement.

=== Membership and chapters ===
In 1912, the organization added its first branches in Boston and Chicago. Seven more were added in 1913 as the NAACP began to welcome new members. By 1915, there were 50 branches with 6,000 members. World War I saw a surge in membership. By 1920, there were 395 branches and more than 90,000 members.

The geography was also changing. Initially there were few chapters in the South but by 1920, there were 74 in that region including every state. Membership fell off in the later 1920s and during the Great Depression but resumed during the 1940s. In 1945, the NAACP claimed 894 branches and 351,000 members. Virtually every town or city where Black folks lived also had an NAACP chapter. This included southern communities although Jim Crow violence made this much riskier in the South than elsewhere and kept membership lower on a per capita basis than in other regions.

That changed in the 1950s. In 1958, the South accounted for well over half of the NAACP's 1,230 chapters and 302,000 members.

=== Jim Crow and disenfranchisement ===
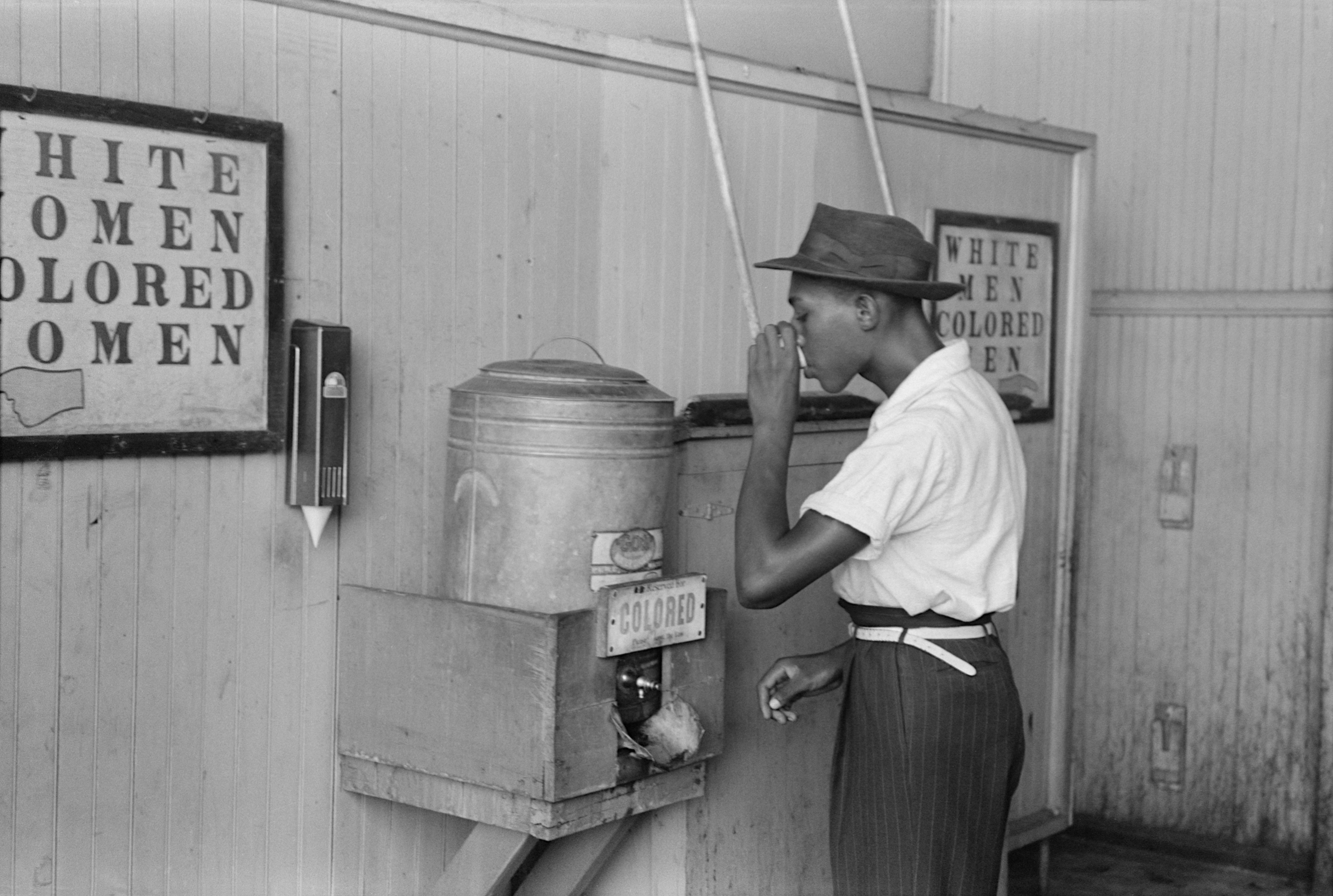
An African American drinks out of a segregated water cooler designated for "colored" patrons in 1939 at a streetcar terminal in Oklahoma City.

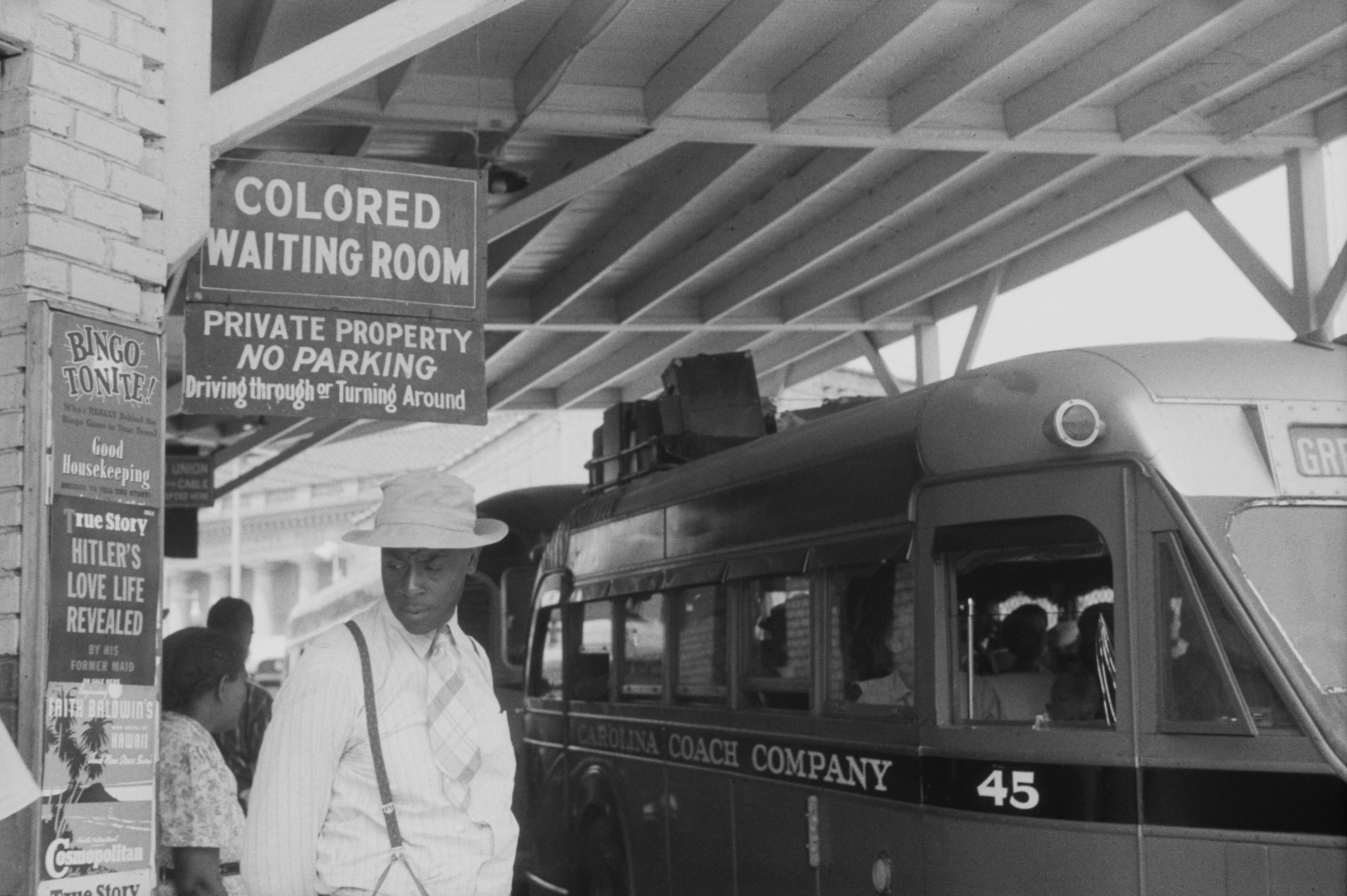
Sign for the "colored" waiting room at a bus station in Durham, North Carolina, 1940

In its early years, the NAACP was based in New York City. It concentrated on litigation in efforts to overturn disenfranchisement of blacks, which had been established in every southern state by 1908, excluding most from the political system, and the Jim Crow statutes that legalized racial segregation.

In 1913, the NAACP organized opposition to President Woodrow Wilson's introduction of racial segregation into federal government policy, workplaces, and hiring. African-American women's clubs were among the organizations that protested Wilson's changes, but the administration did not alter its assuagement of Southern cabinet members and the Southern bloc in Congress.

By 1914, the group had 6,000 members and 50 branches. It was influential in winning the right of African Americans to serve as military officers in World War I. Six hundred African-American officers were commissioned and 700,000 men registered for the draft. The following year, the NAACP organized a nationwide protest, with marches in numerous cities, against D. W. Griffith's silent movie The Birth of a Nation, a film that glamorized the Ku Klux Klan. As a result, several cities refused to allow the film to open.

The NAACP began to lead lawsuits targeting disfranchisement and racial segregation early in its history. It played a significant part in the challenge of Guinn v. United States (1915) to Oklahoma's discriminatory grandfather clause, which effectively disenfranchised most black citizens while exempting many whites from certain voter registration requirements. In 1916, Spingarn and Arthur and Charles Studin established a national Redress Legal Committee under the auspices of the organization's Harlem branch with the aim of dealing "with injustice in the courts as it affects the Negro.” Arthur Studin, who chaired the committee until 1939 and served as NAACP president from 1939 to 1966, coordinated pro bono legal assistance. The committee focused on using the "proper presentation of the legal fight against segregation" and careful selection of test cases to demonstrate how the legal system operated.

The NAACP subsequently persuaded the Supreme Court of the United States to rule in Buchanan v. Warley in 1917 that state and local governments cannot officially segregate African Americans into separate residential districts. The Court's opinion reflected the jurisprudence of property rights and freedom of contract as embodied in the earlier precedent it established in Lochner v. New York. It also played a role in desegregating recreational activities via the historic Bob-Lo Excursion Co. v. Michigan after plaintiff Sarah Elizabeth Ray was wrongfully discriminated against when attempting to board a ferry.

In 1916, chairman Joel Spingarn invited James Weldon Johnson to serve as field secretary. Johnson was a former U.S. consul to Venezuela and a noted African-American scholar and columnist. Within four years, Johnson was instrumental in increasing the NAACP's membership from 9,000 to almost 90,000. In 1920, Johnson was elected head of the organization. Over the next ten years, the NAACP escalated its lobbying and litigation efforts, becoming internationally known for its advocacy of equal rights and equal protection for the "American Negro".

The NAACP devoted much of its energy during the interwar years to fight the lynching of blacks throughout the United States by working for legislation, lobbying, and educating the public. The organization sent its field secretary Walter F. White to Phillips County, Arkansas, in October 1919, to investigate the Elaine massacre. Roving white vigilantes killed more than 200 black tenant farmers and federal troops after a deputy sheriff's attack on a union meeting of sharecroppers left one white man dead. White published his report on the riot in the Chicago Daily News. The NAACP organized the appeals for twelve black men sentenced to death a month later based on the fact that testimony used in their convictions was obtained by beatings and electric shocks. It gained a groundbreaking Supreme Court decision in Moore v. Dempsey 261 U.S. 86 (1923) that significantly expanded the Federal courts' oversight of the states' criminal justice systems in the years to come. White investigated eight race riots and 41 lynchings for the NAACP and directed its study Thirty Years of Lynching in the United States.

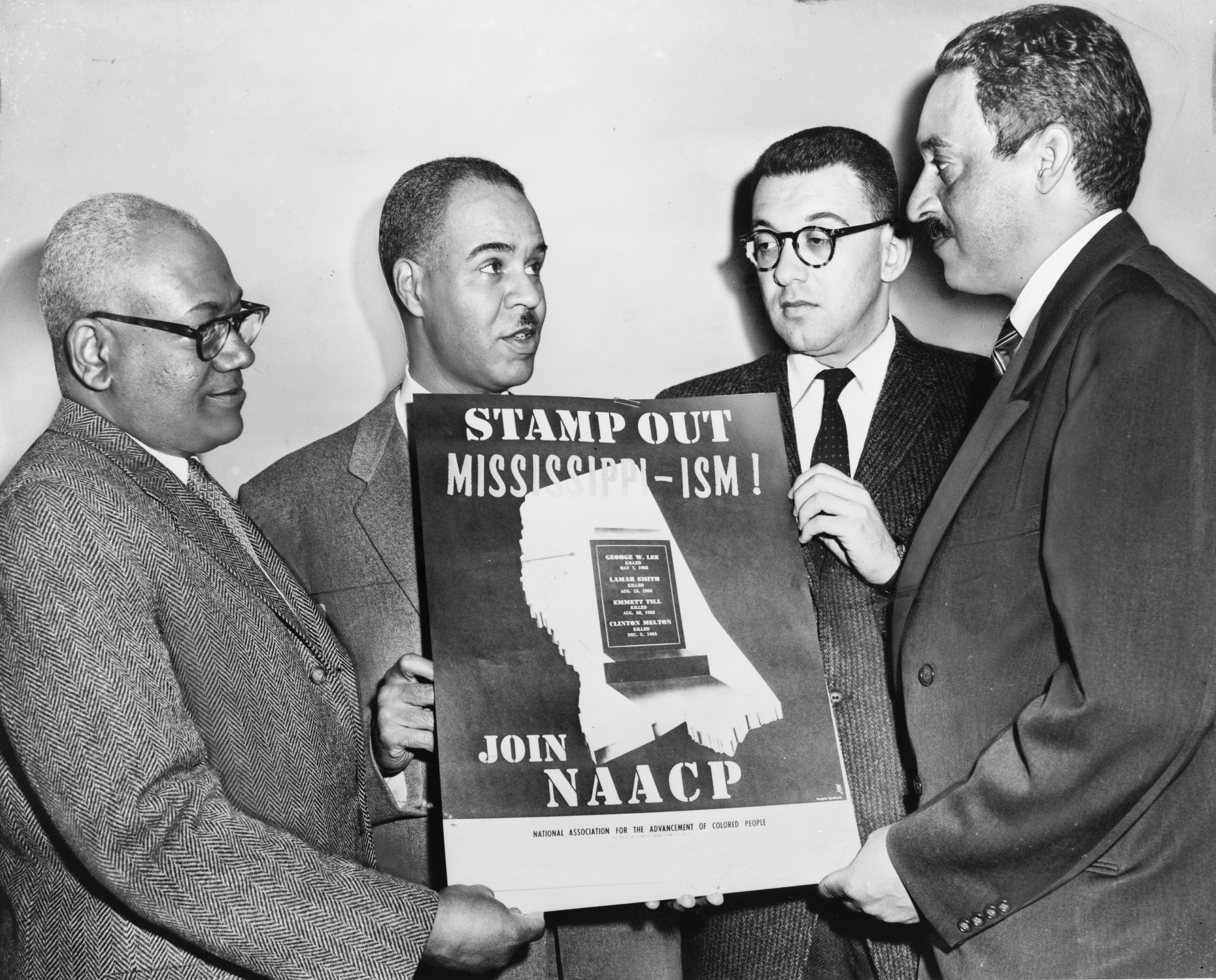
NAACP leaders Henry L. Moon, Roy Wilkins, Herbert Hill, and Thurgood Marshall in 1956

The NAACP also worked for more than a decade seeking federal anti-lynching legislation, but the Solid South of white Democrats voted as a bloc against it or used the filibuster in the Senate to block passage. Because of disenfranchisement, African Americans in the South were unable to elect representatives of their choice to office. The NAACP regularly displayed a black flag stating "A Man Was Lynched Yesterday" from the window of its offices in New York to mark each lynching.

It organized the first of the two 1935 New York anti-lynching exhibitions in support of the Costigan–Wagner Bill, having previously widely published an account of the Lynching of Henry Lowry, as An American Lynching, in support of the Dyer Anti-Lynching Bill.

Throughout the 1930s the NAACP revitalized its youth organization. In 1933, Walter F. White released a memo to the NAACP Board of Directors critiquing the lack of a standardized youth program in the NAACP, saying that one of their biggest problems was that energized young people's ideas were often stifled. Juanita Jackson Mitchell was appointed the national director of a new Youth and College Division in 1936. Its goals were to form new activists and leaders, educate youth on black history, build pride and cooperation, and support national goals of the NAACP. Youth were frequently mobilized to support national legal and political campaigns.

In alliance with the American Federation of Labor, the NAACP led the successful fight to prevent the nomination of John Johnston Parker to the Supreme Court, based on his support for denying the vote to blacks and his anti-labor rulings. It organized legal support for the Scottsboro Boys. The NAACP lost most of the internecine battles with the Communist Party and International Labor Defense over the control of those cases and the legal strategy to be pursued in that case.

The organization also brought litigation to challenge the "white primary" system in the South. Southern state Democratic parties had created white-only primaries as another way of barring blacks from the political process. Since the Democrats dominated southern states, the primaries were the only competitive contests. In 1944 in Smith v. Allwright, the Supreme Court ruled against the white primary. Although states had to retract legislation related to the white primaries, the legislatures soon came up with new methods to severely limit the franchise for blacks.

During the Second Red Scare the NAACP was often linked to Communism by right-wing politicians. The House Un-American Activities Committee, the United States Senate Subcommittee on Internal Security, and security agencies sought to prove to the NAACP had been infiltrated by Communists. To distance themselves from these accusations, the NAACP purged suspected Communists from its membership, according to the Student Nonviolent Coordinating Committee's website.

=== Legal Defense Fund ===
The board of directors of the NAACP created the Legal Defense Fund in 1939 specifically for tax purposes. It functioned as the NAACP legal department. Intimidated by the Department of the Treasury and the Internal Revenue Service, the Legal and Educational Defense Fund, Inc., became a separate legal entity in 1957, although it was clear that it was to operate in accordance with NAACP policy. After 1961 serious disputes emerged between the two organizations, creating considerable confusion in the eyes and minds of the public.

=== Desegregation ===
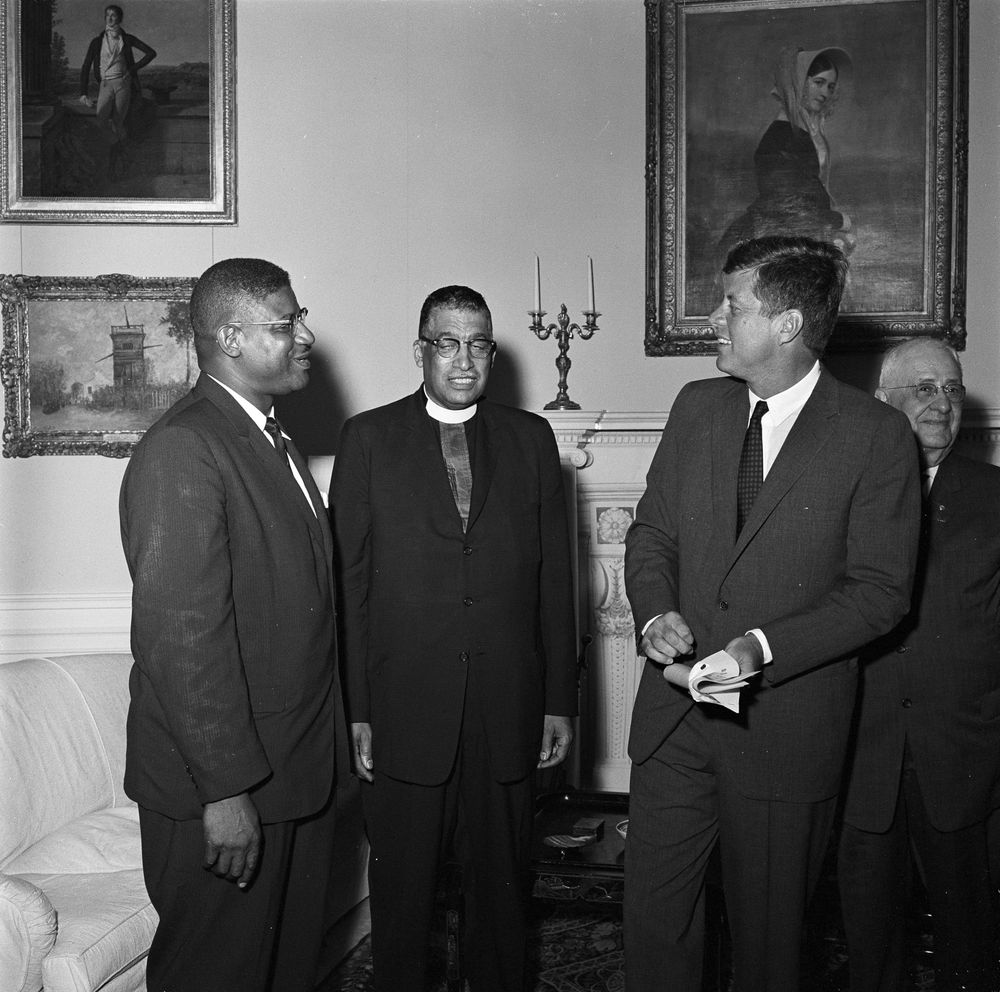
NAACP representatives E. Franklin Jackson and Stephen Gill Spottswood meeting with President Kennedy at the White House in 1961

By the 1940s, the federal courts were amenable to lawsuits regarding constitutional rights, against which Congressional action was virtually impossible. With the rise of private corporate litigators such as the NAACP to bear the expense, civil suits became the pattern in modern civil rights litigation, and the public face of the Civil Rights Movement. The NAACP's Legal department, headed by Charles Hamilton Houston and Thurgood Marshall, undertook a campaign spanning several decades to bring about the reversal of the "separate but equal" doctrine announced by the Supreme Court's decision in Plessy v. Ferguson.

The NAACP's Baltimore chapter, under president Lillie Mae Carroll Jackson, challenged segregation in Maryland state professional schools by supporting the 1935 Murray v. Pearson case argued by Marshall. Houston's victory in Missouri ex rel. Gaines v. Canada (1938) led to the formation of the Legal Defense Fund in 1939.

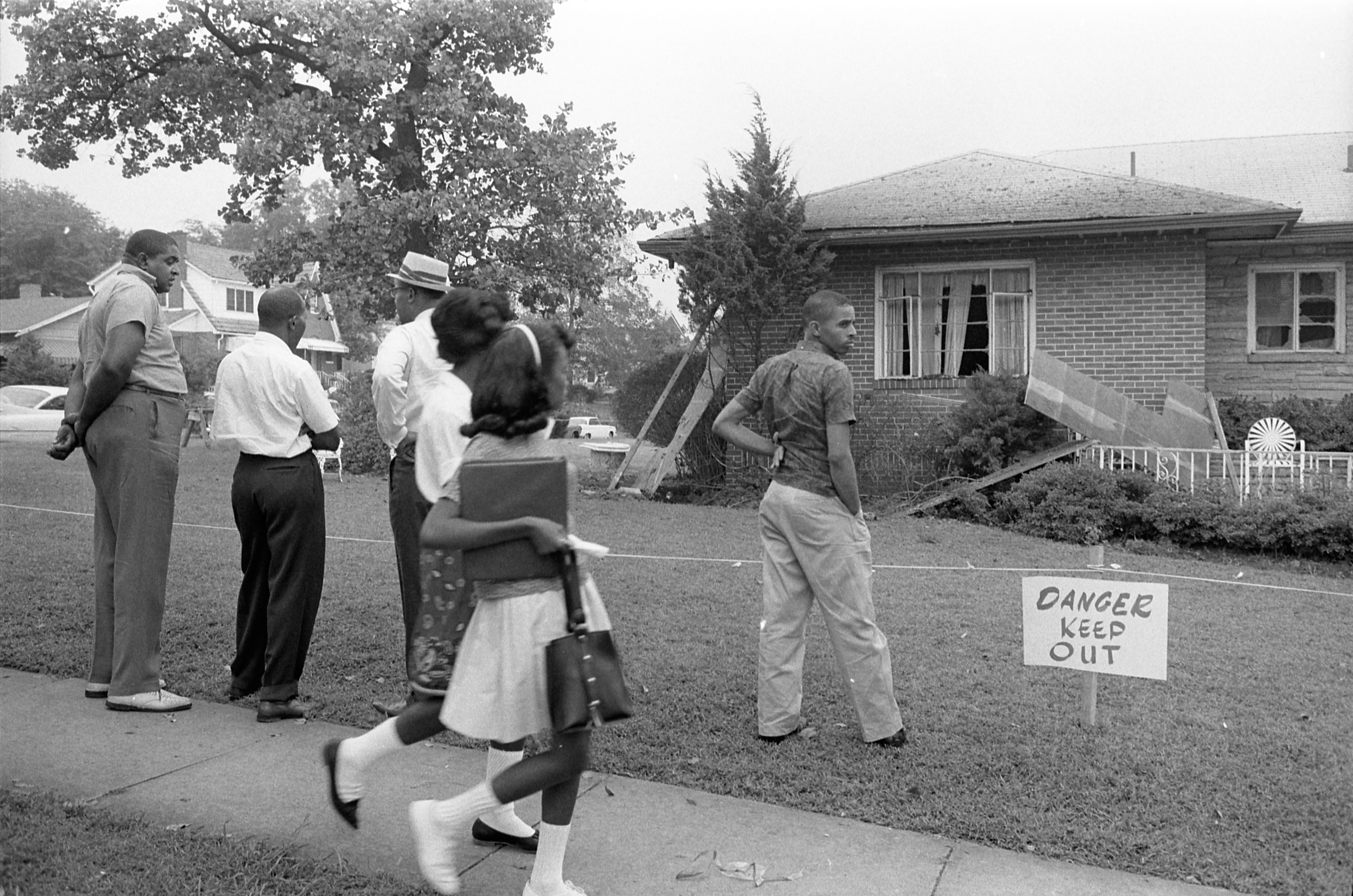
Locals viewing the bomb-damaged home of Arthur Shores, NAACP attorney, Birmingham, Alabama, on September 5, 1963. The bomb exploded on September 4, the previous day, injuring Shores' wife.

The campaign for desegregation culminated in a unanimous 1954 Supreme Court decision in Brown v. Board of Education that held state-sponsored segregation of public elementary schools was unconstitutional. Bolstered by that victory, the NAACP pushed for full desegregation throughout the South. NAACP activists were excited about the judicial strategy. Starting on December 5, 1955, NAACP activists, including Edgar Nixon, its local president, and Rosa Parks, who had served as the chapter's Secretary, helped organize a bus boycott in Montgomery, Alabama. This was designed to protest segregation on the city's buses, two-thirds of whose riders were black. The boycott lasted 381 days. In 1956 the South Carolina legislature created an anti-NAACP oath, and teachers who refused to take the oath lost their positions. After twenty-one Black teachers at the Elloree Training School refused to comply, White school officials dismissed them. Their dismissal led to Bryan v. Austin in 1957, which became an important civil rights case. In Alabama, the state responded by effectively barring the NAACP from operating within its borders because of its refusal to divulge a list of its members. The NAACP feared members could be fired or face violent retaliation for their activities. Although the Supreme Court eventually overturned the state's action in NAACP v. Alabama, 357 U.S. 449 (1958), the NAACP lost its leadership role in the Civil Rights Movement while it was barred from Alabama.

New organizations such as the Southern Christian Leadership Conference (SCLC, in 1957) and the Student Nonviolent Coordinating Committee (SNCC, in 1960) rose up with different approaches to activism. Rather than relying on litigation and legislation, these newer groups employed direct action and mass mobilization to advance the rights of African Americans. Roy Wilkins, NAACP's executive director, clashed repeatedly with Martin Luther King Jr. and other civil rights leaders over questions of strategy and leadership within the movement.

The NAACP continued to use the Supreme Court's decision in Brown to press for desegregation of schools and public facilities throughout the country. Daisy Bates, president of its Arkansas state chapter, spearheaded the campaign by the Little Rock Nine to integrate the public schools in Little Rock, Arkansas.

By the mid-1960s, the NAACP had regained some of its prominence in the Civil Rights Movement by pressing for civil rights legislation. The March on Washington for Jobs and Freedom took place on August 28, 1963. That fall, President John F. Kennedy sent a civil rights bill to Congress before he was assassinated.

President Lyndon B. Johnson worked hard to persuade Congress to pass a civil rights bill aimed at ending racial discrimination in employment, education and public accommodations, and succeeded in gaining passage in July 1964. He followed that with passage of the Voting Rights Act of 1965, which provided for protection of the franchise, with a role for federal oversight and administrators in places where voter turnout was historically low.

Under its anti-desegregation director J. Edgar Hoover, the FBI's COINTELPRO program targeted civil rights groups, including the NAACP, for infiltration, disruption and discreditation.

Kivie Kaplan became NAACP President in 1966. After his death in 1975, scientist W. Montague Cobb took over until 1982. Roy Wilkins retired as executive director in 1977, and Benjamin Hooks, a lawyer and clergyman, was elected his successor.

=== The 1990s ===
In 1990, Esther Rolle became the first woman to earn the NAACP Chairman's Civil Rights Leadership Award.

In the 1990s, the NAACP ran into debt. The dismissal of two leading officials further added to the picture of an organization in deep crisis. After such, Rupert Richardson began her term as president of the NAACP in 1992.

In 1993, the NAACP's Board of Directors narrowly selected Reverend Benjamin Chavis over Reverend Jesse Jackson to fill the position of executive director. A controversial figure, Chavis was ousted eighteen months later by the same board. They accused him of using NAACP funds for an out-of-court settlement in a sexual harassment lawsuit. Following the dismissal of Chavis, Myrlie Evers-Williams narrowly defeated NAACP chairperson William Gibson for president in 1995, after Gibson was accused of overspending and mismanagement of the organization's funds.

In 1996, Congressman Kweisi Mfume, a Democratic Congressman from Maryland and former head of the Congressional Black Caucus, was named the organization's president. Three years later strained finances forced the organization to drastically cut its staff, from 250 in 1992 to 50.

In the second half of the 1990s, the organization restored its finances, permitting the NAACP National Voter Fund to launch a major get-out-the-vote offensive in the 2000 U.S. presidential elections. 10.5 million African Americans cast their ballots in the election; this was one million more than four years before. The NAACP's effort was credited by observers as playing a significant role in Democrat Al Gore's winning several states where the election was close, such as Pennsylvania and Michigan.

=== Lee Alcorn controversy ===
During the 2000 presidential election, Lee Alcorn, president of the Dallas NAACP branch, criticized Al Gore's selection of Senator Joe Lieberman for his vice-presidential candidate because Lieberman was Jewish. On a gospel talk radio show on station KHVN, Alcorn stated, "If we get a Jew person, then what I'm wondering is, I mean, what is this movement for, you know? Does it have anything to do with the failed peace talks? ... So I think we need to be very suspicious of any kind of partnerships between the Jews at that kind of level because we know that their interest primarily has to do with money and these kind of things."

NAACP President Kweisi Mfume immediately suspended Alcorn and condemned his remarks. Mfume stated,

I strongly condemn those remarks. I find them to be repulsive, anti-Semitic, anti-NAACP and anti-American. Mr. Alcorn does not speak for the NAACP, its board, its staff or its membership. We are proud of our long-standing relationship with the Jewish community and I personally will not tolerate statements that run counter to the history and beliefs of the NAACP in that regard.

Alcorn, who had been suspended three times in the previous five years for misconduct, subsequently resigned from the NAACP. He founded what he called the Coalition for the Advancement of Civil Rights. Alcorn criticized the NAACP, saying, "I can't support the leadership of the NAACP. Large amounts of money are being given to them by large corporations with which I have a problem." Alcorn also said, "I cannot be bought. For this reason I gladly offer my resignation and my membership to the NAACP because I cannot work under these constraints."

Alcorn's remarks were also condemned by Jesse Jackson, Jewish groups and George W. Bush's rival Republican presidential campaign. Jackson said he strongly supported Lieberman's addition to the Democratic ticket, saying, "When we live our faith, we live under the law. He [Lieberman] is a firewall of exemplary behavior." Al Sharpton, another prominent African-American leader, said, "The appointment of Mr. Lieberman was to be welcomed as a positive step." The leaders of the American Jewish Congress praised the NAACP for its quick response, stating that: "It will take more than one bigot like Alcorn to shake the sense of fellowship of American Jews with the NAACP and black America ... Our common concerns are too urgent, our history too long, our connection too sturdy, to let anything like this disturb our relationship."

=== George W. Bush ===
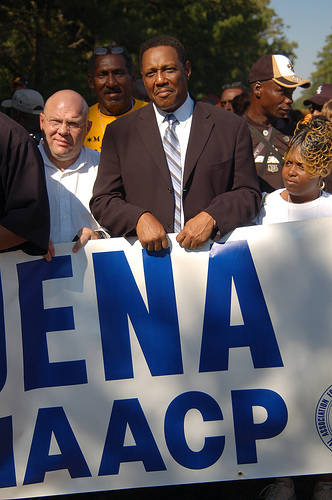
Louisiana NAACP leads Jena March 6

In 2004, President George W. Bush declined an invitation to speak to the NAACP's national convention. Bush's spokesperson said that Bush had declined the invitation to speak to the NAACP because of harsh statements about him by its leaders. In an interview, Bush said, "I would describe my relationship with the current leadership as basically nonexistent. You've heard the rhetoric and the names they've called me." Bush said he admired some members of the NAACP and would seek to work with them "in other ways".

On July 20, 2006, Bush addressed the NAACP national convention. He made a bid for increasing support by African Americans for Republicans, in the midst of a midterm election. He referred to Republican Party support for civil rights.

=== Tax exempt status ===
In October 2004, the Internal Revenue Service informed the NAACP that it was investigating its tax-exempt status based on chairman Julian Bond's speech at its 2004 Convention, in which he criticized President George W. Bush as well as other political figures. In general, the US Internal Revenue Code prohibits organizations granted tax-exempt status from "directly or indirectly participating in, or intervening in, any political campaign on behalf of (or in opposition to) any candidate for elective public office." The NAACP denounced the investigation as retaliation for its success in increasing the number of African Americans who were voting. In August 2006, the IRS investigation concluded with the agency's finding "that the remarks did not violate the group's tax-exempt status."

=== LGBT rights ===
As the American LGBT rights movement gained steam after the Stonewall riots of 1969, the NAACP became increasingly affected by the movement to gain rights for lesbian, gay, bisexual and transgender people. While chairman of the NAACP, Bond became an outspoken supporter of the rights of gays and lesbians and stated his support for same-sex marriage. He boycotted the 2006 funeral services for Coretta Scott King, as he said the King children had chosen an anti-gay megachurch. This was in contradiction to their mother's longstanding support for the rights of gay and lesbian people. In a 2005 speech in Richmond, Virginia, Bond said:

African Americans ... were the only Americans who were enslaved for two centuries, but we were far from the only Americans suffering discrimination then and now. ... Sexual disposition parallels race. I was born this way. I have no choice. I wouldn't change it if I could. Sexuality is unchangeable.

In a 2007 speech on the Martin Luther King Day Celebration at Clayton State University in Morrow, Georgia, Bond said, "If you don't like gay marriage, don't get gay married." His positions have pitted elements of the NAACP against religious groups in the civil rights movement who oppose gay marriage, mostly within the Southern Christian Leadership Conference (SCLC). The NAACP became increasingly vocal in opposition against state-level constitutional amendments to ban same-sex marriage and related rights. State NAACP leaders such as William J. Barber II of North Carolina participated actively against North Carolina Amendment 1 in 2012, but voters passed it.

On May 19, 2012, the NAACP's board of directors formally endorsed same-sex marriage as a civil right, voting 62–2 for the policy in a Miami, Florida quarterly meeting. Benjamin Jealous, the organization's president, said of the decision, "Civil marriage is a civil right and a matter of civil law. ... The NAACP's support for marriage equality is deeply rooted in the 14th Amendment of the United States Constitution and equal protection of all people." Possibly significant in the NAACP's vote was its concern with the HIV/AIDS crisis in the black community; while AIDS support organizations recommend that people live a monogamous lifestyle, the government did not recognize same-sex relationships as part of this. As a result of this endorsement, Keith Ratliff Sr. of Des Moines, Iowa, resigned from the NAACP board.

=== Travel warning regarding Missouri ===
On June 7, 2017, the NAACP issued a warning for African-American travelers to Missouri:

Individuals traveling in the state are advised to travel with extreme CAUTION. Race, gender and color based crimes have a long history in Missouri. Missouri, home of Lloyd Gaines, Dred Scott and the dubious distinction of the Missouri Compromise and one of the last states to lose its slaveholding past, may not be safe. ... [Missouri Senate Bill] SB 43 legalizes individual discrimination and harassment in Missouri and would prevent individuals from protecting themselves from discrimination, harassment, and retaliation in Missouri.

Moreover, over-zealous enforcement of routine traffic violations in Missouri against African Americans has resulted in an increasing trend that shows African Americans are 75% more likely to be stopped than Caucasians.

Missouri NAACP Conference president Rod Chapel Jr., suggested that visitors to Missouri "should have bail money."

=== Censorship ===
The NAACP led protests of the 1915 film The Birth of a Nation. In 2019, the NAACP called for a ban of all Dr. Seuss books from public schools and libraries, citing discriminatory depictions of Blacks, Jews, Indigenous peoples, Muslims, and Asians. In 2023, the group sued to block a book from being banned from school libraries.

=== Travel warning regarding Florida ===
In May 2023 in response to new laws targeting people of color and LGBTQ+ individuals, the American Civil Liberties Union, the NAACP, the League of United Latin American Citizens, and Equality Florida issued travel advisories for visitors to Florida.

Under its current Governor, the State of Florida has engaged in an all-out attack on Black Americans, accurate Black history, voting rights, members of the LGBTQ+ community, immigrants, women's reproductive rights, and free speech, while simultaneously embracing a culture of fear, bullying, and intimidation by public officials. In his effort to rewrite American history to exclude the voices, contributions of African Americans and the challenges they overcame despite the systemic racism that African Americans have faced since first arriving in this country, Governor DeSantis has signed various controversial anti-civil rights measures into law; including the Combatting Violence, Disorder and Looting and Law Enforcement Protection Act Florida HB 1, Stop Wrongs against Our Kids and Employees Act ("Stop W.O.K.E. Act") Florida HB 7, Constitutional Carry Act Florida House HB 543, Florida Senate Bill 266, and Florida Senate Bill 7066.

== Local branch impact ==
The organization's national initiatives, political lobbying, and publicity efforts were handled by the headquarters staff in New York and Washington, D.C. Court strategies were developed by the legal team based for many years at Howard University.

NAACP local branches have also been important. When, in its early years, the national office launched campaigns against The Birth of a Nation, it was the local branches that carried out the boycotts. When the organization fought to expose and outlaw lynching, the branches carried the campaign into hundreds of communities. And while the Legal Defense Fund developed a federal court strategy of legal challenges to segregation, many branches fought discrimination using state laws and local political opportunities, sometimes winning important victories.

Those victories were mostly achieved in Northern and Western states before World War II. When the Southern civil rights movement gained momentum in the 1940s and 1950s, credit went both to the Legal Defense Fund attorneys and to the massive network of local branches that Ella Baker and other organizers had spread across the region.

Local organizations built a culture of black political activism.

== Current activities ==
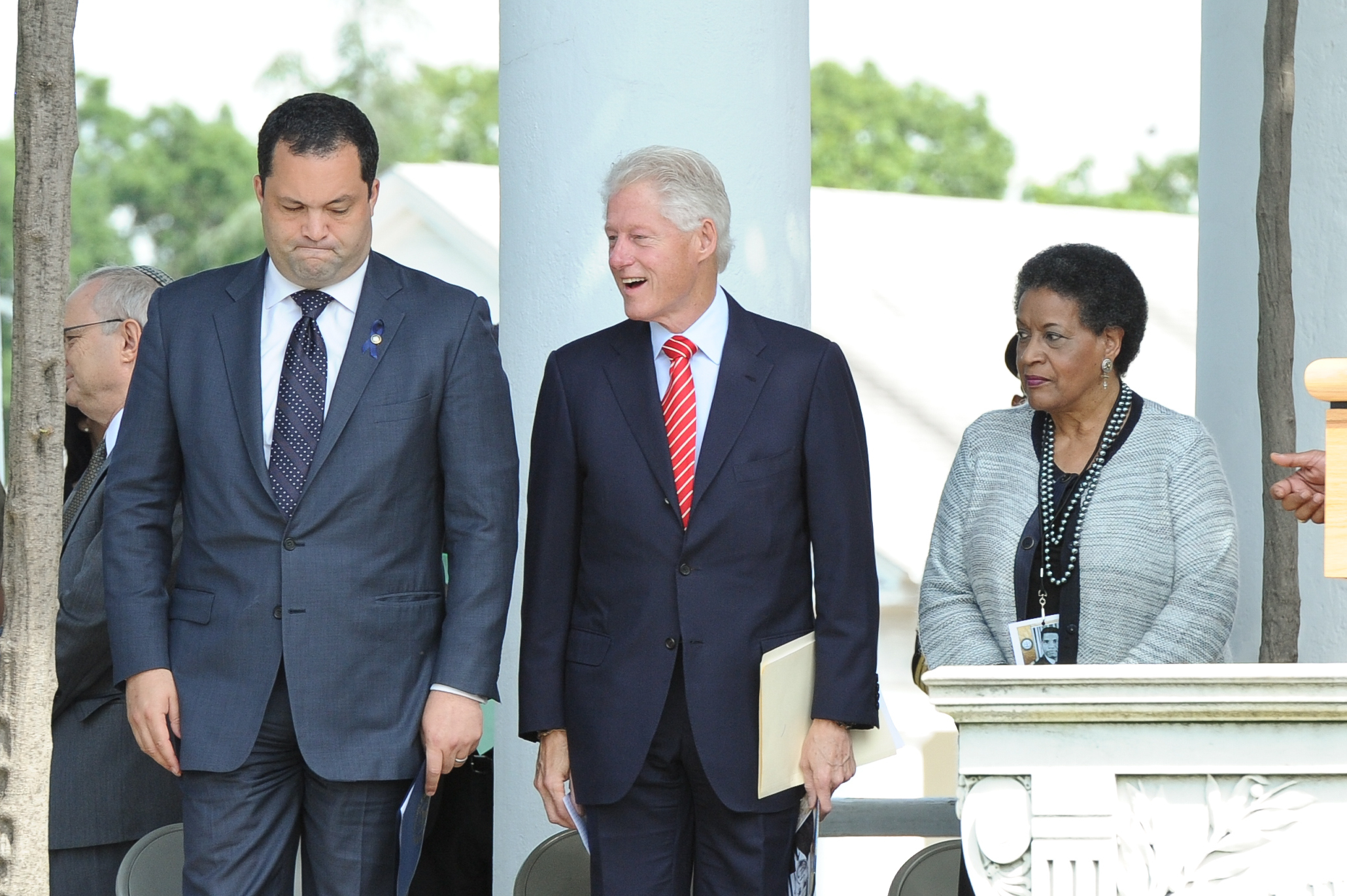
NAACP President and CEO Benjamin Jealous and former president Bill Clinton during the Medgar Evers wreath-laying ceremony in Arlington, June 5, 2013

=== Youth ===
Youth sections of the NAACP were established in 1936; there are now more than 600 groups with a total of more than 30,000 individuals in this category. The NAACP Youth & College Division is a branch of the NAACP in which youth are actively involved. The Youth Council is composed of hundreds of state, county, high school and college operations where youth (and college students) volunteer to share their opinions with their peers and address local and national issues. Sometimes volunteer work expands to a more international scale.

==== Youth and College Division ====
"The mission of the NAACP Youth & College Division shall be to inform youth of the problems affecting African Americans and other racial and ethnic minorities; to advance the economic, education, social and political status of African Americans and other racial and ethnic minorities and their harmonious cooperation with other peoples; to stimulate an appreciation of the African Diaspora and other African Americans' contribution to civilization; and to develop an intelligent, militant effective youth leadership."

==== ACT-SO program ====
Since 1978, the NAACP has sponsored the Afro-Academic, Cultural, Technological and Scientific Olympics (ACT-SO) program for high school youth around the United States. The program is designed to recognize and award African-American youth who demonstrate accomplishment in academics, technology, and the arts. Local chapters sponsor competitions in various categories for young people in grades 9–12. Winners of the local competitions are eligible to proceed to the national event at a convention held each summer at locations around the United States. Winners at the national competition receive national recognition, along with cash awards and various prizes.

=== Environmental justice ===
The environmental justice group at NAACP is headed by Abre' Conner and has 11 full-time staff members. In April 2019, the NAACP published a report outlining the tactics used by the fossil fuel industry. The report claims that "Fossil fuel companies target the NAACP for manipulation and co-optation." The NAACP has been concerned about the influence of utilities which have contributed massive amounts of money to NAACP chapters in return for chapter support of non-environmentally friendly goals of utilities. In response, the NAACP has been working with its chapters to encourage them to support environmentally sound policies.

==== Headquarters ====
On June 29, 2020, WTOP-FM, a Washington, D.C. news radio station, reported that the NAACP intended to relocate its national headquarters from its longtime home in Baltimore to the Franklin D. Reeves Center of Municipal Affairs, a building owned by the Government of the District of Columbia, located at U and 14th Streets in Northwest Washington, D.C. Derrick Johnson, the NAACP's president and CEO, emphasized that the organization will be better able to engage in and influence change in D.C. than in Baltimore.

== National convention ==
The NAACP's national convention has been held annually in the following cities:

- 1909: New York City
- 1910: New York City
- 1928: Los Angeles
- 1929: Cleveland
- 1954: Dallas
- 1980: Miami Beach, Florida
- 1981: Denver
- 1982: Boston
- 1983: New Orleans
- 1984: Kansas City, Missouri
- 1985: Dallas
- 1986: Baltimore
- 1987: New York City
- 1988: Washington, D.C.
- 1989: Detroit
- 1990: Los Angeles
- 1991: Houston
- 1992: Nashville, Tennessee
- 1993: Indianapolis
- 1994: Chicago
- 1995: Minneapolis
- 1996: Charlotte, North Carolina
- 1997: Pittsburgh
- 1998: Atlanta
- 1999: New York City
- 2000: Baltimore
- 2001: New Orleans
- 2002: Houston
- 2003: Miami
- 2004: Philadelphia
- 2005: Milwaukee
- 2006: Washington, D.C.
- 2007: Detroit
- 2008: Cincinnati
- 2009: New York City
- 2010: Kansas City, Missouri
- 2011: Los Angeles
- 2012: Houston
- 2013: Orlando, Florida
- 2014: Baltimore
- 2015: Philadelphia
- 2016: Cincinnati
- 2017: Baltimore
- 2018: San Antonio
- 2019: Detroit
- 2020: Virtually
- 2021: Virtually
- 2022: Atlantic City, New Jersey
- 2023: Boston
- 2024: Chicago
- 2025: Charlotte, North Carolina
- 2026: Chicago

== Awards ==
- NAACP Image Awards – honoring African-American achievements in film, television, music, and literature
- NAACP Theatre Awards – honoring African-American achievements in theatre productions
- Spingarn Medal – honoring general African-American achievements
- Thalheimer Award – for achievements by NAACP branches and chapters
- Montague Cobb Award – honoring African-American achievements in the field of health
- Nathaniel Jones Award for Public Service – first awarded to public servants in 2018
- Foot Soldier In the Sands Award – awarded to attorneys who have contributed legal expertise to the NAACP on a pro bono basis
- Juanita Jackson Mitchell Award for Legal Activism – awarded to an NAACP unit for "exemplary legal redress committee activities"
- William Robert Ming Advocacy Award – awarded to lawyers who exemplify personal and financial sacrifice for human equality

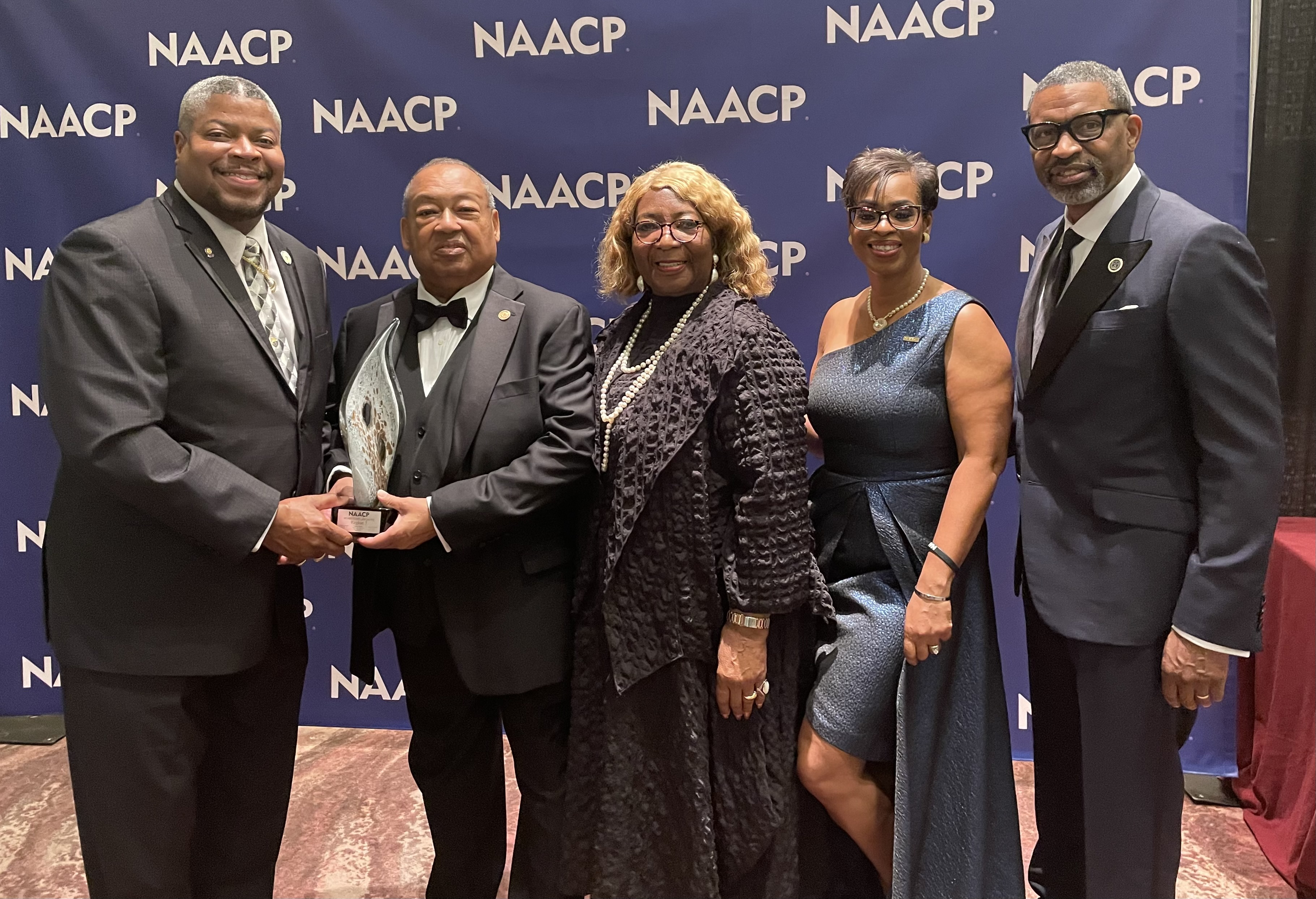
Dayton (OH) NAACP President Derrick L. Foward Receives Thalheimer Award for Publications in Atlantic City, New Jersey in July 2022

== See also ==
- Althea T. L. Simmons, NAACP attorney
- Civil rights movement (1896–1954)
- Chicago Better Housing Association
- The Crisis, official magazine
- National Independent Political League
- NAACP New Orleans Branch
- NAACP Theatre Award – President's Award
- Niagara Movement
- Racial integration
