= Back River Wastewater Treatment Plant =

Wastewater treatment plant in Maryland, USA

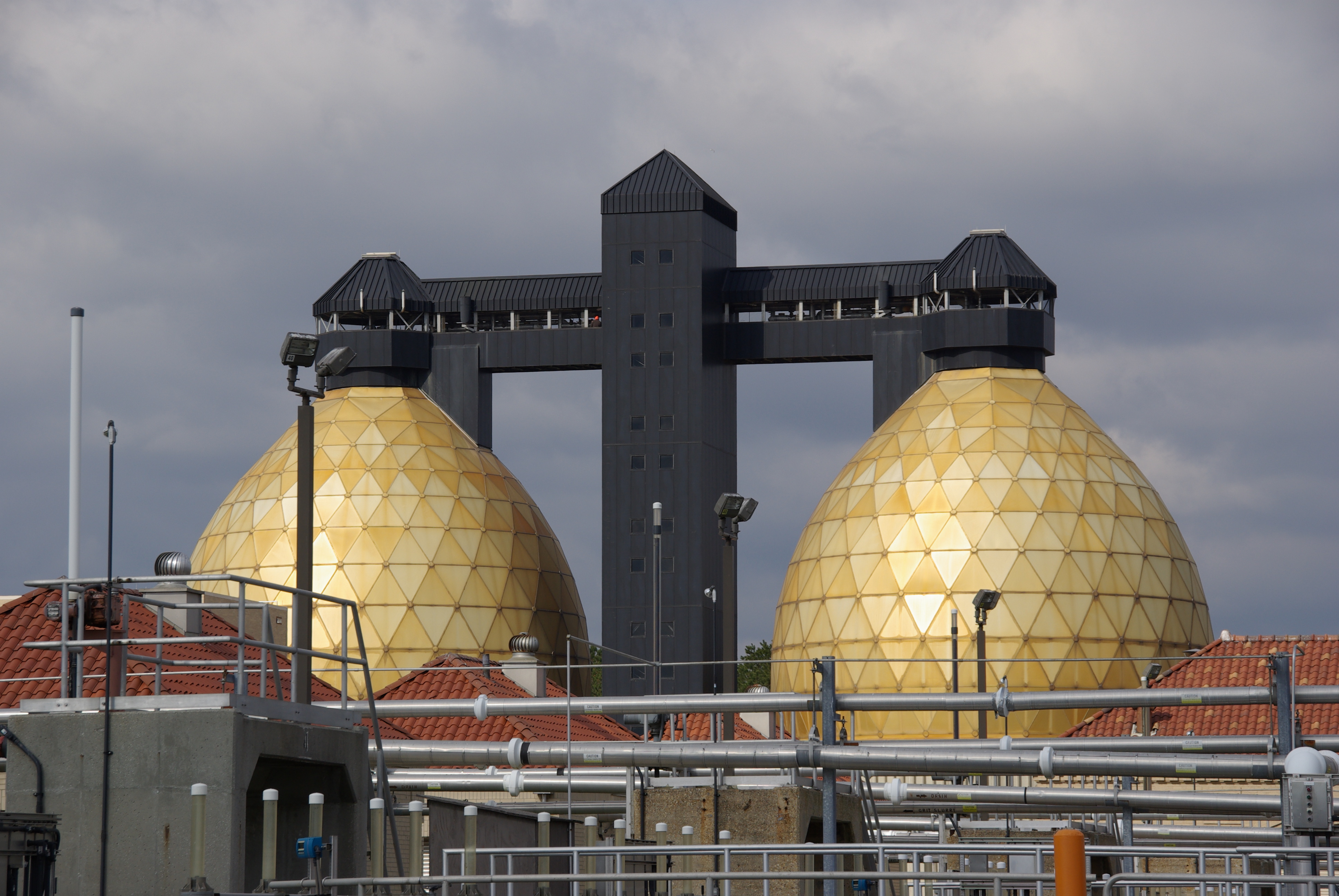
- Back River in 2008

General information
- Status: Operational
- Location: 8201 Eastern Ave, Baltimore, Maryland, U.S.
- Coordinates: 39°17′36.3″N 76°29′35.7″W
- Groundbreaking: October 23, 1906
- Opened: October 27, 1911
- Cost: $23 million (Note: This amount is roughly equivalent to $681 million in 2025 when taking into account inflation.)
- Owner: City of Baltimore

Technical details
- Grounds: 466 acres (189 ha)

The Back River Wastewater Treatment Plant is a wastewater treatment plant in Baltimore, Maryland, United States. It serves the city of Baltimore, which owns and operates the facility, as well as Baltimore County, Maryland, and discharges treated water into the Back River and the Patapsco River.

== History ==
=== Early proposals ===
Several proposals to build a wastewater treatment system in Baltimore were made leading up to the 20th century as the city experienced explosive growth in population and economic production. In the absence of storm sewers, winter storms would cause ice pileups in the city's streets and alleys, impeding the movement of business vehicles and emergency services and thereby increasing the cost of transportation and business in the city. This issue limited Baltimore's ability to attract outside business, as business owners told local officials that they would not move to Baltimore until sewage and other improvements were made to the city's physical plant. National efforts to quarantine people with communicable diseases, especially during smallpox epidemics, contributed to calls to build a sewer system in the city and spurred the creation of the 1893 Baltimore Sewerage Commission.

Baltimore's political systems largely ignored calls to build a city-wide sewer system. The city government was organized along geographic rather than functional lines up until 1898, which contributed to fragmentation in government and limited the mayor's ability to spur the city council to act on behalf of the whole city. Proposals to build a city-wide sewer system also saw opposition from local interest groups, wealthy communities, and the Maryland General Assembly, with the Baltimore City Delegation clashing with other legislators on how much eminent domain power to give to the city to build the sewer system and on the makeup of the sewerage commission board. Other opposition came from those concerned about the estimated $10 million cost of the project and how the city would afford to build the sewer system. Property owners pushed against any changes to the city's tax code to pay for a city-wide sewer system, with wealthier residents fearing that tax code changes may close loopholes that allowed them to evade city taxes by listing their permanent residence in Baltimore County. Proposals to build a city-wide sewer system did not appear viable until 1903, when both gubernatorial and mayoral candidates pledged to support the project.

=== 1905 referendum and construction ===
1905 Baltimore sewer loan referendum
Choice	Votes	%
For	37,177	59.55
Against	25,253	40.45
Total	62,430	100.00

The Great Baltimore Fire in February 1904 triggered a downtown rebuilding campaign that proved Baltimore's willingness to pursue large projects and renewed a sense of urgency among city officials to compete with other cities for economic development through infrastructure improvements. In April 1905, Baltimore voters approved a referendum permitting a $10 million bond issue to build a municipal sewer system, with 59.6 percent of residents approving the measure. No major organization publicly opposed the referendum, with many newspapers, ministers, businesspersons, and politicians rallying behind the vote. Shortly after it passed, Mayor E. Clay Timanus appointed a commission to determine how the sewer system should be designed; the commission eventually decided on a plan of dual and connected sewers, with one carrying stormwater and the other carrying human and industrial wastes.

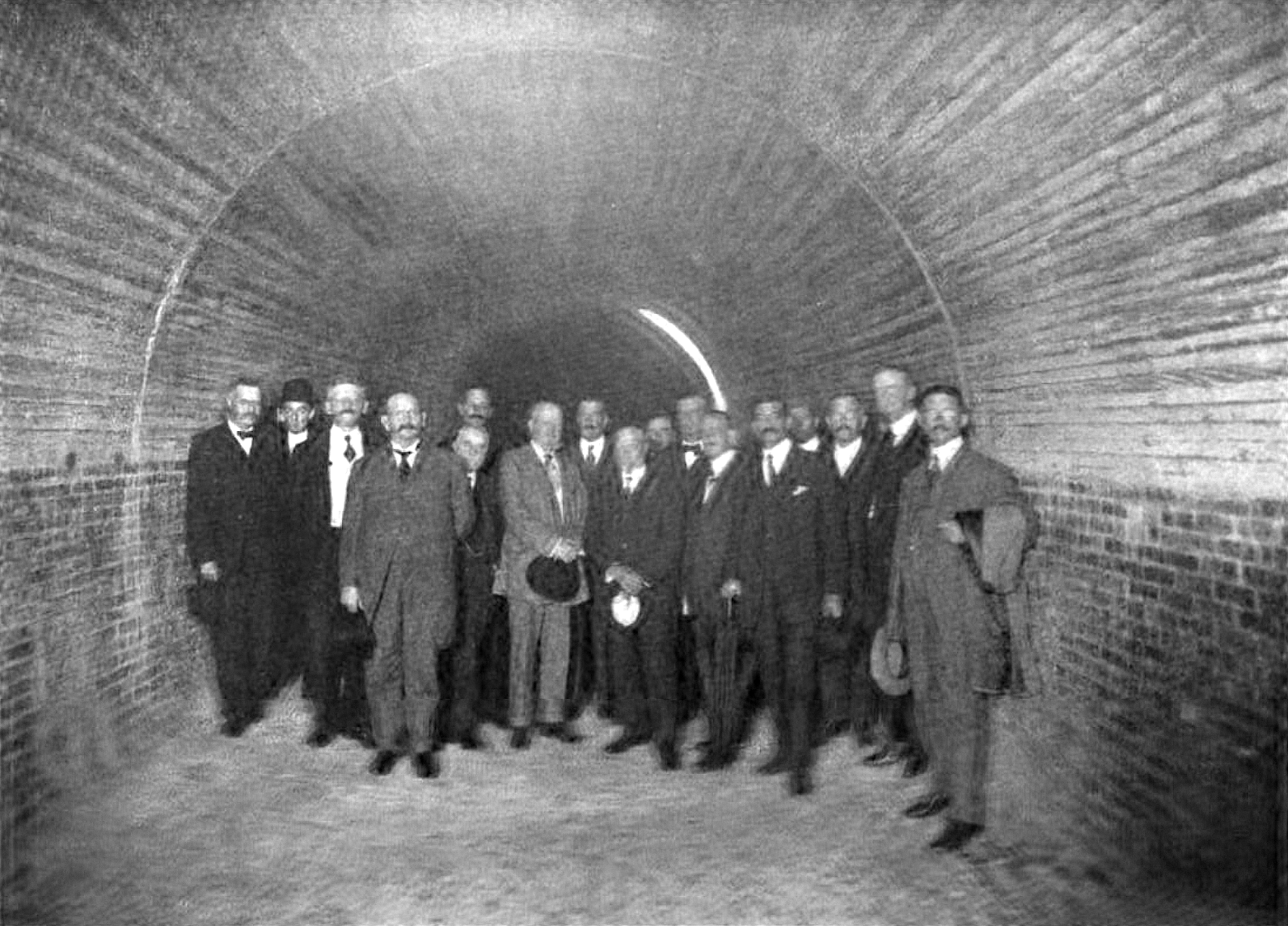
Maryland governor John Walter Smith, the Baltimore Sewerage Commission, financiers and engineer Hendrick in Outfall Sewer (c. 1909)

On November 4, 1905, Calvin W. Hendrick was unanimously elected as chief engineer for the construction of the Baltimore sewage system. Surveying work for the sewer system started on January 15, 1906, and construction began on October 23, 1906. The sewerage system went into service on October 27, 1911, initially serving about 2,500 homes in northeast Baltimore. Approximately 800 miles of sewer drains were built and more than 100,000 houses were connected to the system by August 1916, at a cost of $23 million.

== Function ==
The Back River Wastewater Treatment Plant is designed to treat 180 million gallons of wastewater per day, but can receive up to 400 million gallons daily with decreased treatment. The plant includes six fine screens to remove large objects from wastewater flowing into the plant, which then makes its way into grit removal basins to settle out sand and other particles; debris removed from the wastewater are taken to the Quarantine Road Landfill in south Baltimore. Next, the wastewater is distributed among eleven primary sedimentation tanks, wherein approximately 65% of organic material settles, which is taken to solid processing while the wastewater continues to Secondary Treatment. In Secondary Treatment, wastewater is transferred into three fine bubble-activated sludge facilities—where microorganisms metabolize organic pollutants and compromise activated sludge, which is separated from the affluent through sedimentation—before making its way to Advanced Treatment, where water is distributed between 48 sand beds, each containing 11 inches of sand, which traps most of the remaining suspended solids. The wastewater finally makes its way into the Final Treatment stage, where it is disinfected, dechlorinated, and aerated before flowing into Back River.

In March 2023, an explosion and fire damaged a building used by contractor Synagro to convert waste into agricultural pellets. Another fire occurred at this building in September 2025. In April 2026, the city of Baltimore agreed to pay $38.5 million over the next three years to Synagro as a result of a breakdown in its sewage sludge processing as a result of the fire damage, which has forced Synagro to ship Baltimore's sewage out of state at a cost of millions of dollars a month to the city.

== Spiders ==
In 2009, a massive volumetric structure of spider webs occupying 4,100 cubic meters was discovered in a building at the plant. Researchers estimate that over 100 million orb-weaver spiders lived in the building.

== Environmental issues ==
Back River was selected to receive effluent from the adjacent wastewater treatment plant in the early 1900s because it was in a sparsely populated area and would function as a polishing system for the plant's effluent from its trickling filter process. As time went on and the Baltimore metropolitan area continued to grow, flows increased and the water quality suffered from silt build-ups in the upper tidal portion of the river, especially after the area's post-World War II growth explosion. Despite lawsuits and other environmental actions, water quality in the Back River remained poor with odors, algal blooms, and floating solids. Before upgrades were completed on the wastewater treatment plant in 1998, algal blooms would sometimes turn the river a shade of iridescent green that would accumulate along the shoreline on windy days. In addition, chlorophyll concentrations in the river would sometimes exceed 200 μg/L and occasionally 300 μg/L; today, chlorophyll concentrations now average 50 to 75 μg/L, which is still above the ideal range of 25 to 35 μg/L.

In 2002, the city of Baltimore entered into a consent decree with the U.S. Environmental Protection Agency, the U.S. Department of Justice, and the Maryland Department of the Environment (MDE), which required the city to upgrade its sewage system and eliminate sewage overflows by 2016. This deadline was later moved back to 2030. In February 2010, MDE identified the Back River plant as the primary contributor to nutrient inputs to the river, as well as a contributor to water quality degradation in the Back River. Enhanced nutrient removal improvements were made to the Back River plant to reduce nutrient inputs through a denitrification process that converts filtered nutrients to nitrogen gas.

According to a June 2022 MDE report, the Back River plant has suffered from severe staffing shortages and persistent repair and maintenance issues since 2019, worsened by the impact of the COVID-19 pandemic in Maryland and a 2019 ransomware attack against Baltimore City. In January 2022, MDE and Maryland attorney general Brian Frosh filed a lawsuit against the city of Baltimore, seeking civil penalties against the city and an order requiring the city to take steps that would make the plant comply with the state's environmental laws. In November 2023, the city and MDE reached a settlement that included $4.75 million in civil penalties against the city and required city officials to adopt a timeline for improvements at the Back River plant.

In March 2022, MDE conducted an inspection of operations at the Back River plant, during which state inspectors found malfunctioning nitrogen filters, heavy amounts of scum at different parts of the plant, and "unacceptable algae and vegetation growth" on equipment meant to treat sewage. Following this, the department issued an order giving the city 48 hours to end illegal discharges of water pollution into the Back River, and a few days later, the department announced that the Maryland Environmental Service (MES, a non-profit environmental management company established by the Maryland General Assembly) would temporarily take control of the Back River plant. The MES was tasked with overseeing the operation, maintenance, and improvements to the plant, ensuring that the city complies with the terms of its discharge agreement, and ceasing all illegal discharges from the plant into the river. By September 2022, the plant was once again complying with federal and state environmental regulations, according to city and state environmental officials. In April 2025, the MDE announced that it had awarded grants to make further improvements to the Baltimore treatment plants, and to install a trash interceptor on the Back River.
