= Bread and Cheese =

Bread and Cheese may refer to:

- Bread and Cheese Club, art and literary society in Melbourne, Australia
- Bread and Cheese Creek, Maryland, USA
- Bread and Cheese Revolt, 1491—92 folk uprising in North Holland
- Bread and Cheese Day, a Six Nations celebration in Canada
