= Belford Lawson Jr. =

American attorney and civil rights activist (1901–1985)

- Born: July 9, 1901; Roanoke, Virginia, U.S.
- Died: February 23, 1985 (aged 83); Washington, D.C., U.S.
- Education: Howard University; Yale Law School; University of Michigan
- Occupation: Lawyer
- Known for: New Negro Alliance v. Sanitary Grocery Co. President of Alpha Phi Alpha; President of the YMCA

Belford Vance Lawson Jr. (July 9, 1901 – February 23, 1985) was an American attorney and civil rights activist who made at least eight appearances before the U.S. Supreme Court. He was the first African-American man to win a case before the Supreme Court and the first African-American president of YMCA. His wife, Marjorie McKenzie Lawson, was also an attorney who served as the first African-American female judge to receive senatorial confirmation to the newly created Juvenile Court of the District of Columbia

== Early life ==
Belford Lawson was born and grew up in Roanoke, Virginia. He was a student at Hampton Institute in Virginia from 1916 until 1919, and Michigan's Ferris Institute from 1919 to 1920. He attended the University of Michigan and was the school's second African-American varsity football player. He was the only African American on the varsity during Fielding H. Yost's coaching tenure.

After graduating from college in 1924, Lawson taught at Morris Brown College and worked in the life insurance industry. He then attended Yale Law School, followed by enrollment at Howard University School of Law, from which he graduated in 1932.

== Career ==
In 1933, Lawson founded the New Negro Alliance (NNA) in Washington, D.C., along with John A. Davis Sr. and M. Franklin Thorne, to challenge white-owned businesses in black neighborhoods that would not hire black employees. The NNA instituted a Don't Buy Where You Can't Work campaign, considered radical at the time, and organized or threatened boycotts against white-owned businesses that did not hire blacks. In response, some businesses arranged for an injunction to stop the picketing. Lawson, the lead attorney, with assistance by Thurgood Marshall, fought back – all the way to the United States Supreme Court in New Negro Alliance v. Sanitary Grocery Co. (1938). The court ruled that the organization and residents had a right to boycott. This became a landmark case in the struggle by African Americans against discriminatory hiring practices. Don't Buy Where You Can't Work groups multiplied throughout the nation. The NNA estimated that by 1940, the group had secured 5,106 jobs for blacks because businesses could not afford to lose sales of black customers during the Great Depression.

In 1934, Lawson encouraged National Association for the Advancement of Colored People (NAACP) special counsel Charles Houston to authorize Thurgood Marshall to file the case of Murray v. Maryland (1935) to challenge the state law requiring segregation in the University of Maryland School of Law. Marshall won the case, and Donald Murray was admitted to the university's law school.

Lawson was part of the legal team that won Henderson v. Southern Railway Company (1950), challenging the Interstate Commerce Commission's approval of railroad racial segregation practices. The lawsuit resulted in the abolition of segregation in railroad dining cars.

Lawson was the 16th General President of Alpha Phi Alpha fraternity. The fraternity sponsors an annual Belford V. Lawson Oratorical Contest. Collegiate members compete in oratorical skills at the chapter level, with the winner competing at the state, regional, and general conventions. The fraternity says "the purpose of the Belford V. Lawson Oratorical Contest is to identify problems or special topics of interest within society and determine how the problem or topic relates to the goals and objectives of Alpha Phi Alpha Fraternity, Incorporated."

In 1973, Lawson was elected president of YMCA of the USA. He continued to be active in law and civic activities but reduced his activities in later years. He died in Washington, D.C., in 1985, after having battled age-related dementia and stomach cancer.

Preceded by Rayford Logan	General President of Alpha Phi Alpha; 1946–1951	Succeeded by Antonio M. Smith
