= John Aubrey Davis Sr. =

John Aubrey Davis Sr. (May 10, 1912 – December 17, 2002) was an African-American political science professor and activist of the Civil Rights Movement. He served as the head academic researcher on the historic Brown v. Board of Education (1954) case, in which the United States Supreme Court ruled that racial segregation of public schools, including universities, was unconstitutional. He had taught at Howard University, Lincoln University of Pennsylvania, and became chair of the department of political science at City College of New York.

== Early life, education and marriage ==
Davis was born in the Washington, D.C. area in 1912 to John Abraham Davis and Gabrielle Dorothy (Beale) Davis. He and his two older siblings (anthropologist Allison Davis and sister Dorothy Davis Lucas) were raised on a farm in Virginia. They attended and graduated from Dunbar High School (Washington, D.C.), a top academic high school for black students, which their father had also attended.

Like his older brother Allison, Davis attended Williams College, where he graduated in 1933. Upon graduation from Williams, he continued in postgraduate studies, earning a master's degree in political science from the University of Wisconsin–Madison in 1934, and a doctorate degree in political science from Columbia University in 1949, which was funded with a Rosenwald Fund Fellowship.

Davis married Mavis Wormley. They had two sons together, John A. Davis Jr. and Smith W. Davis.

== Academic career ==
Davis taught at Howard University in the mid-1930s and after receiving his doctorate. He later was selected for a position as a full professor in political science at Lincoln University (Pennsylvania), a historically black college.

In 1953, Davis was named an associate professor at City College of New York. There he was promoted to professor of government in the graduate faculty, and then to chairman of the department of political science at City College.

== Civil rights work ==
Davis had become active in civil rights in 1933, when he formed the New Negro Alliance with Belford Lawson Jr. and M. Franklin Thorne. They challenged a white-owned business operating in African-American neighborhoods of Washington, DC that fired black workers to replace them with white, although most of their customers were black. To protest this practice, the Alliance organized the "Don't Buy Where You Can't Work" campaign in the height of the Great Depression, calling for boycotts and picketing of these businesses by neighborhood customers. Most businesses, afraid of losing revenue in a shaky economic period, caved in to the protests. Others fought back and sought an injunction against the group.

Initially, the lower courts sided with the businesses, but the case reached the Supreme Court, which in 1938 sided with The Alliance. Future Supreme Court Justice Thurgood Marshall represented The Alliance in the case, which was known as New Negro Alliance vs. Sanitary Grocery Company Inc.. In the process, he formed a close lifelong friendship with Davis.

In 1953, Marshall appointed Davis to head the academic research task force for the historic Brown v. Board of Education of Topeka case. Working with a team of more than 200 scholars, who included Horace Mann Bond (father of Julian Bond, a future NAACP president), historian C. Vann Woodward, William Robert Ming Jr., Alfred Kelly, and historian John Hope Franklin, Davis compiled the factual evidence that was presented in Marshall's arguments against the "separate but equal" doctrine, proving that the Fourteenth Amendment prohibited racial discrimination.

Following this project, Davis was appointed in 1957 to the New York State Commission on Discrimination by Governor W. Averell Harriman.

== American Society of African Culture ==
Davis was one of the founders of the American Society of African Culture (AMSAC), which was founded to promote of African-American culture, though was later found to be a pass-through organization for the CIA. As president of AMSAC, he served as vice chair of the United States Committee for the First World Festival of Negro Art (1966).

== Later years ==
After years in Washington, DC, Davis lived in New Rochelle, New York while teaching at City University. He retired in 1980 and later moved to Scottsdale, Arizona, where he died in December of 2002.
