= Back River (Maryland) =

River in Maryland, United States

Location
- Country: United States
- State: Maryland
- City: Essex

Physical characteristics
- Source
  - location: Rosedale
  - coordinates: 39.3076074°N 76.519408°W
- Mouth: Chesapeake Bay
  - location: Edgemere
  - coordinates: 39.2437193°N 76.4002369°W
  - elevation: 0 ft (0 m)
- Length: 9 mi (14 km)
- Basin size: 61 mi^{2} (160 km^{2})

Basin features
- Tributaries
  - left: Moore's Run, Northeast Creek, Deep Creek
  - right: Herring Run, Bread and Cheese Creek

Back River is a tidal estuary in Baltimore County, Maryland, located about 2 miles (3 km) east of the city of Baltimore. The estuary extends from Essex, Maryland, southeast for about 8.8 miles (14.2 km) to the Chesapeake Bay. The watershed area is 39,075 acres (15,813 ha) and includes Essex Skypark Airport and the Back River Wastewater Treatment Plant. The river is shared between Essex, Dundalk, and Edgemere, Maryland.

== Water quality ==
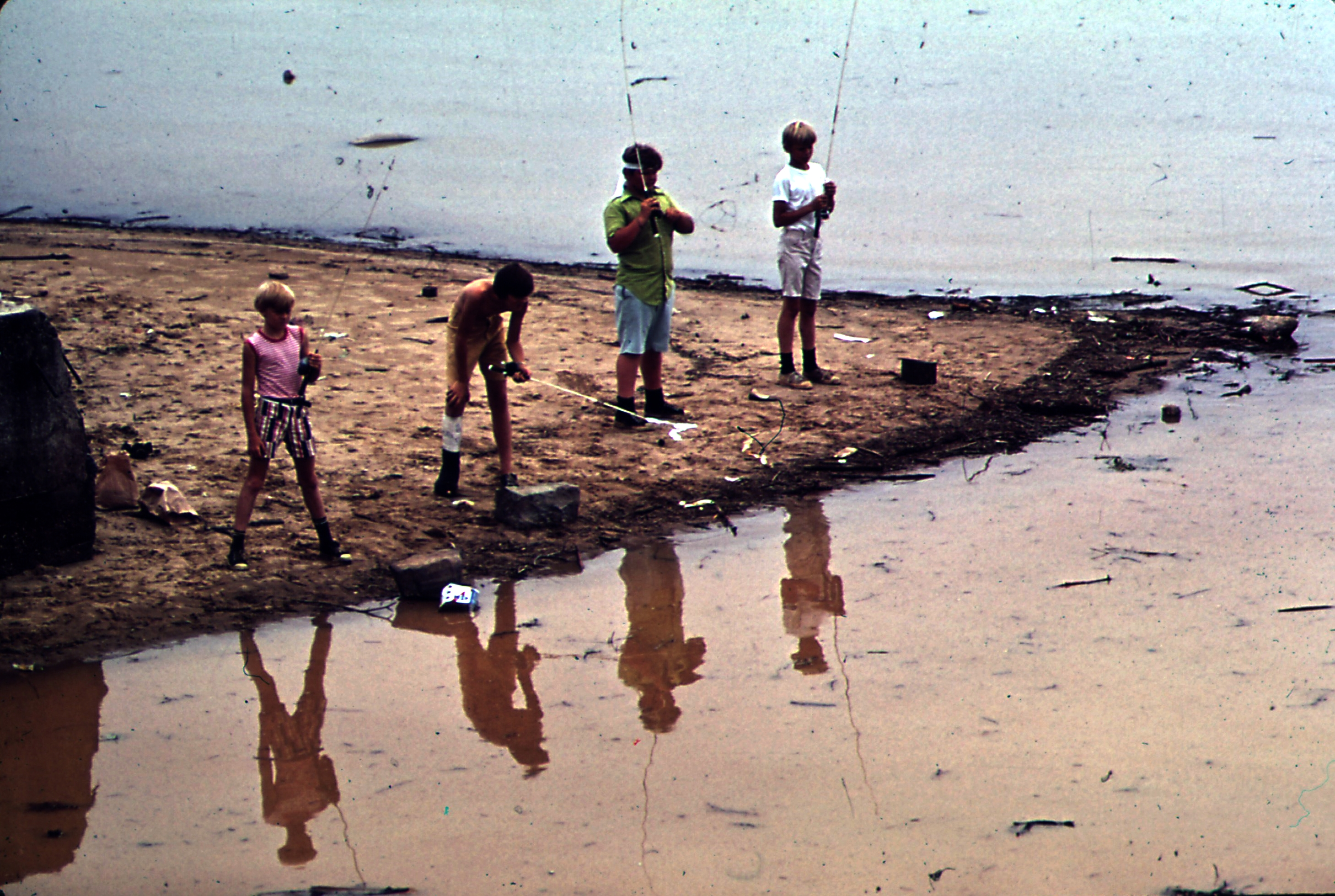
Fishing on the Back River, near the sewage treatment plant, in 1973

Back River is in a highly urbanized area and is subject to extensive urban runoff and other forms of water pollution. The Maryland Department of the Environment (MDE) has listed water quality impairments in the mainstem river for chlordane (a pesticide), and nutrients (nitrogen and phosphorus). The Herring Run tributary is listed as impaired due to high levels of bacteria. The Baltimore County Department of Environmental Protection and Resource Management (DEPRM) has classified Bread and Cheese Creek as having a “Very High Priority” for stormwater management actions, due to the large amount of trash and sediment found in it. The county recommends implementing a number of remedial activities to control urban runoff pollution, including "downspout disconnection, storm drain marking, buffer improvement, alley retrofit, street sweeping, tree planting and public education."

Back River receives discharges of treated sewage from the Back River Wastewater Treatment Plant, one of two large treatment plants that serve Baltimore City and Baltimore County. The plant contributes to treating 132 million gallons of waste water from the city of Baltimore every day. In 2021, water samples in Back River showed signs of high levels of bacteria. Adjustments were made to the plants treatment system under the Headworks Project in 2021, which costed approximately 430 million dollars and which allowed for underground storage of wastewater that could not currently be handled.

The plant is designed to meet state and federal standards, but occasionally the city sewage collection system experiences sanitary sewer overflows (SSOs) during large rainstorms, which can cause excessive pollutant discharges into the river. The plant has also experienced severe staffing shortages and persistent repair and maintenance issues since 2019, which can lead to sewage spills and leaks. Issues at the plant were again discovered in 2022, when the river showed high levels of bacteria. Advisories were published to have locals avoid contact with the water. State inspectors found a general lack of maintenance of the plant; specifically, pumps and tanks were clogged with solid buildup and vegetation. Plants known as phragmites grew in secondary clarifiers, further jamming the treatment process. In 2022 MDE ordered that the Maryland Environmental Service (MES, a non-profit environmental management company established by the Maryland General Assembly) would temporarily take control of the Back River plant, overseeing operations, maintenance, and plant improvements. After a lawsuit was filed in 2022 against Baltimore City by the MDE and Blue Water Baltimore, a settlement was reached in 2023, requiring a fee of $4.75 million to be paid as well as the creation of a timeline of changes moving forward.

Although improvements have been made to the plant, a major overflow of Back River plant in 2024 led to the overflow of 14 million gallons of untreated water into the local area. Restoration efforts continue, with Maryland governor Wes Moore allotting $600 million in his 2026 fiscal year budget for the upgrades to Maryland's wastewater issues. Approximately, $80,000 has also been put forward to continuous monitoring of Back River. In 2025 MDE awarded grants to make further improvements to the Back River plant, and to install a trash interceptor on the river.

== Tributaries ==
The Back River watershed consists of 73 miles (117 km) of streams in Baltimore County and Baltimore City.

- Armistead Run
- Biddison Run
- Bread and Cheese Creek
- Brien’s Run
- Chinquapin Run
- Deep Creek
- Duck Creek
- Herring Run
- Moore’s Run
- Northeast Creek
- Redhouse Run
- Stemmers Run
- Tiffany Run

== See also ==
- List of rivers of Maryland
