= 1911 Baltimore mayoral election =

Baltimore mayoral election, 1911
- May 2, 1911
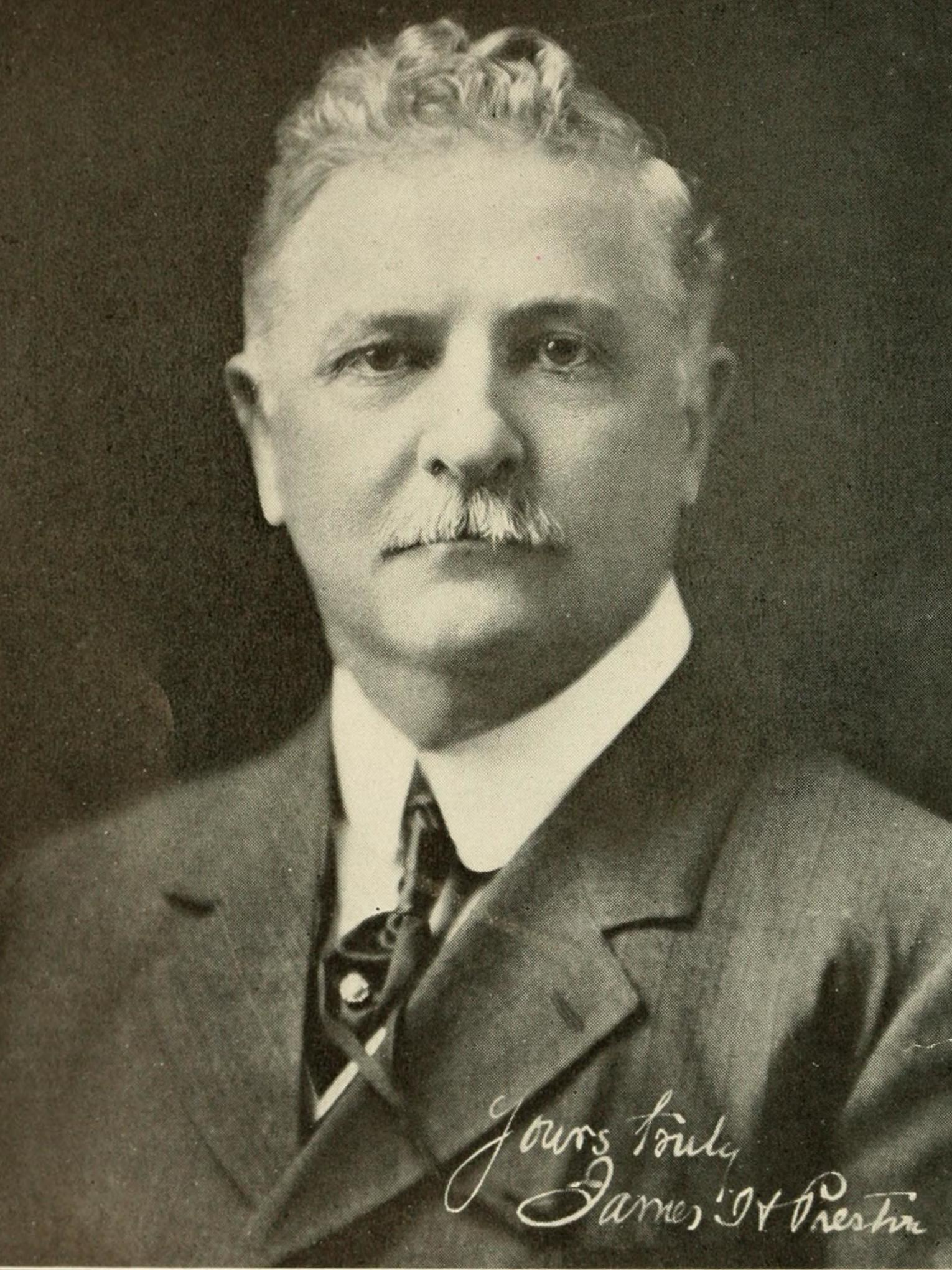

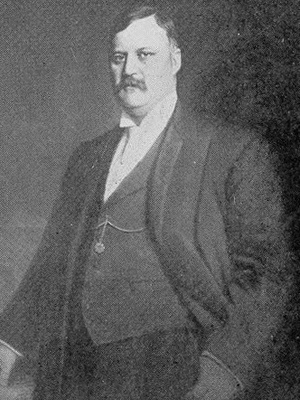
Candidate	James H. Preston	E. Clay Timanus
Party	Democratic	Republican
Popular vote	47,508	46,809
Percentage	50.37%	49.63%
Mayor before election
J. Barry Mahool
Democratic
Elected mayor
James H. Preston
Democratic

The 1911 Baltimore mayoral election saw the election of James H. Preston.

== Nominations ==
Incumbent Democratic mayor J. Barry Mahool lost reelection in the Democratic primary to James H. Preston.

Former mayor E. Clay Timanus won the Republican nomination.

== General election ==
The general election was held May 2.

Baltimore mayoral general election, 1911
Party	Candidate	Votes	%
Democratic	James H. Preston	47,508	50.37%
Republican	E. Clay Timanus	46,809	49.63%
Total votes		94,317	
