= 1907 Baltimore mayoral election =

Baltimore mayoral election, 1907
- May 7, 1907
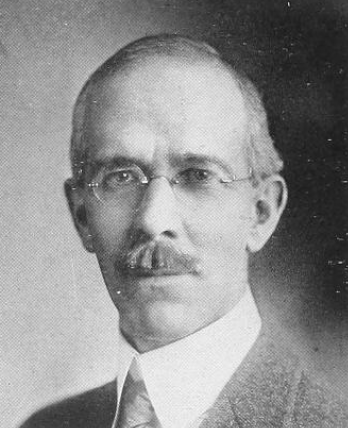

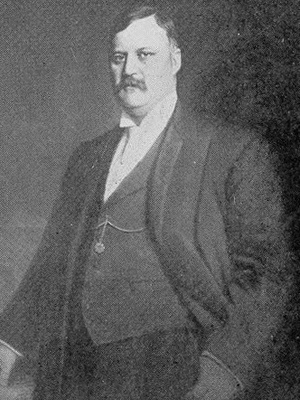
Candidate	J. Barry Mahool	E. Clay Timanus
Party	Democratic	Republican
Popular vote	48,254	43,584
Percentage	52.54%	47.46%
Mayor before election
E. Clay Timanus
Republican
Elected mayor
J. Barry Mahool
Democratic

The 1907 Baltimore mayoral election saw the election of J. Barry Mahool.

== General election ==
The general election was held May 7.

Baltimore mayoral general election, 1907
Party	Candidate	Votes	%
Democratic	J. Barry Mahool	48,254	52.54%
Republican	E. Clay Timanus (incumbent)	43,584	47.46%
Total votes		91,838	
