= Carey Law School =

Carey Law School or Carey Law may refer to:

- University of Maryland Francis King Carey School of Law
- University of Pennsylvania Carey Law School
