= Flash Weekly Newspicture Magazine =

Former magazine

Flash Weekly Newspicture Magazine (also written as Flash!) was a photojournalism magazine created by and for African Americans. The magazine ran between 1937 and 1939. Flash was produced weekly by editor Dutton Ferguson and was based in Washington, D.C. and New York. The first issue came out on March 6, 1937. The power of photography to depict Black life was central to the mission of Flash magazine. Graphic design and cartoons were also important to the magazine, and a young Georg Olden served as an art director.

Notable contributors included:

- Charles Harris.
- Robert H. McNeill.
- Robert Scurlock.
