= Robert H. McNeill =

American photographer (1917–2005)

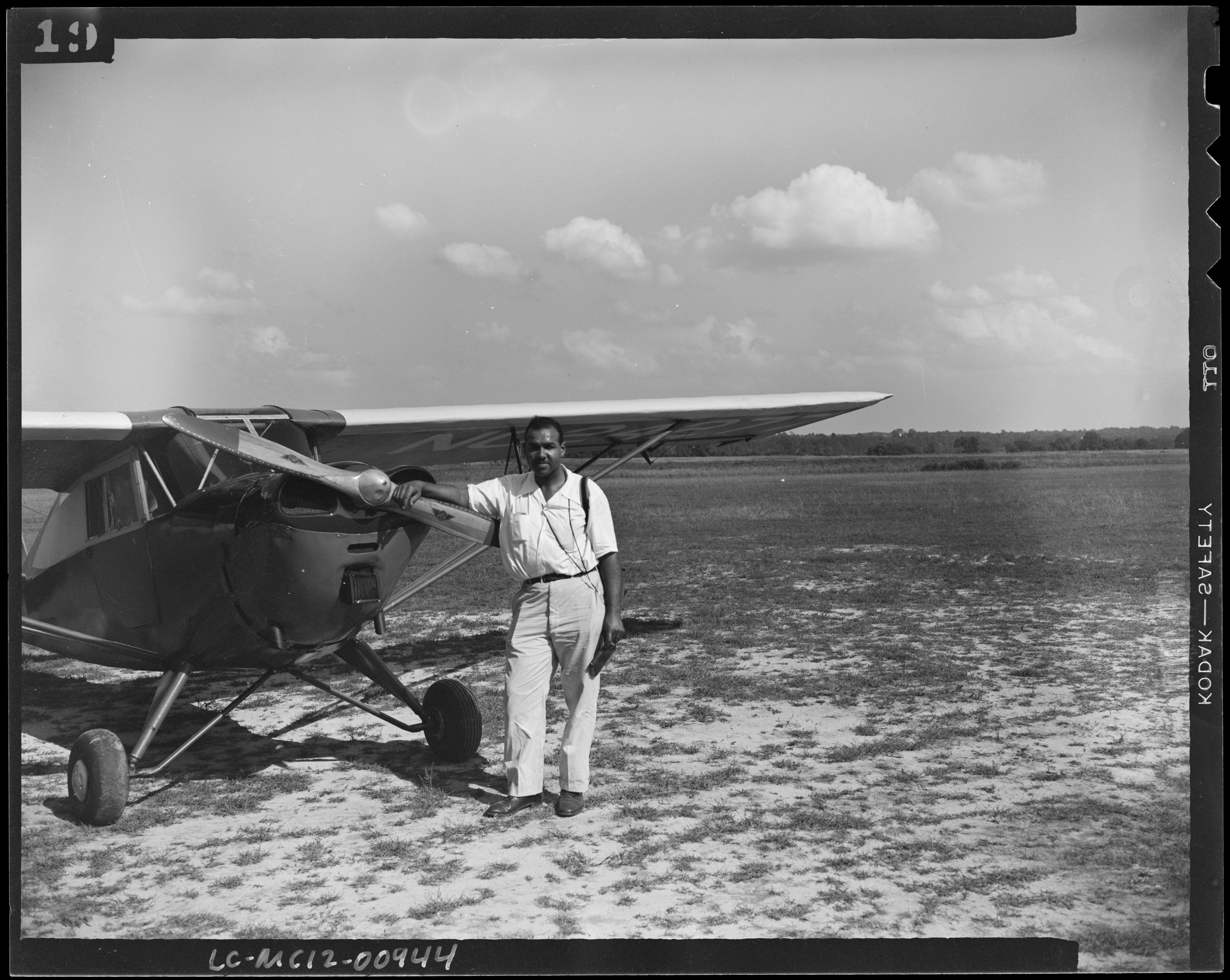
- McNeill in 1947
- Born: December 19, 1917; Washington, D.C., U.S.
- Died: May 27, 2005 (aged 87)
- Occupation: Photographer

Robert H. McNeill (December 19, 1917 – May 27, 2005) was an American photographer who documented African-American life. "In the 1930s and 40s, any time there was a political, social, religious or community event in Washington's black community, Robert H. McNeill was there to photograph it."

== Early life and education ==
McNeill was born in Washington, D.C.: his father William C. McNeill was a physician and medical educator, and his mother Mary Alice (née Wheeler) McNeill was a DC school teacher and member of the Board of Education. He discovered his interest in photography as a high school student at Dunbar High School, where his aunt Bertha Clay McNeill taught. She gave him his first camera and encouraged his career.

== Career ==
=== Education ===
As an 18-year-old sophomore at Washington's Howard University, McNeill photographed the 1936 Olympics hero Jesse Owens during his post-Olympics visit to the campus. He sold the photograph to the two local African-American newspapers and to all four of the daily "mainstream" DC newspapers, whose coverage of the African-American community had generally been very limited. That was a pivotal moment in his career. After attending Howard University for two years as a pre-medical student, he entered the New York Institute of Photography where he graduated in 1938.

=== New York ===
New York City was a fertile field for photographic subjects and an inspiration for McNeill. He photographed dancers at the Savoy Ballroom, cartoonist E. Simms Campbell and Lionel Hampton and Benny Goodman (rehearsing for the famous Carnegie Hall Concert of 1938) among others.

While at the institute, McNeill learned that Fortune magazine was looking for photographs of the "domestic workers, mostly black, who assembled on designated street corners each day to sell their labor to the highest bidder." McNeill was developing his own style of documentary photography as he juxtaposed images of the black workers with their surroundings; for example, three women and a man standing beneath a movie poster that reads, "Make a Wish". As part of the project, McNeill was able to follow Bessie Windstown as she stood waiting on a corner for a prospective job, through her negotiations with a white housewife from the Bronx for her hourly wage to the employer's home, where he was able to photograph her scrubbing the floor on her hands and knees. In the end, Fortune did not use McNeill's pictures; their final story, "The Servant Problem", portrayed the story from the employers’ viewpoint. McNeill was able to publish the essay "The Bronx Slave Market" in Flash!, a Washington and NYC-based, black-edited magazine. He returned to Washington in 1938 and established himself as a free-lance photographer.

=== Virginia ===
That same year, McNeill's work came to the attention of Sterling Brown, a faculty member at Howard University and the Negro Affairs editor for the Federal Writers' Project. Brown was launching what was to be known as the Negro in Virginia study. The project was unique in that it had "an all-black research staff led by Hampton Institute scientist Roscoe Lewis"; the mission was to document "three centuries of black history through sources as varied as ex-slave narratives, economic statistics, and photographs."

McNeill spent most of September 1938 traveling as an uncompensated consultant through the state of Virginia alone in a black coupe with USA license plates. With 160 images for his Speed Graphic camera and a few rolls of 35 mm for a borrowed Leica, the young photographer had to be very judicious about his shots. During those three weeks, he filmed workers at their jobs from the most menial to the black middle class. He encountered the tobacco workers, the longshoremen, and bankers.

Only a few of McNeill's epic photographs of black life in the state were eventually published in Virginia: A Guide to the Old Dominion and that world invisible to most of America, The Negro in Virginia, in 1940.

=== Washington, D.C. ===
During the 1930s and 1940s, McNeill chronicled the lives of African Americans in Washington, DC. He photographed events for the Boy and Girl Scouts, the black YMCA and YWCA, and the African American Junior League. He recorded weddings, cotillions, graduations, meetings, awards ceremonies, and baptisms; one of his famous photographs is of a multiple baptism by Pentecostal minister Daddy Grace. He paid particular attention to people going about their daily lives—an iceman, a hairdresser, workers at a corner market, movers, and boys reading comic books on a street corner.

After his success with the Jesse Owens photograph, McNeill continued to contribute to black newspapers throughout the country. He had an eye for significant events in the African American community, and he had an ear for learning where things were happening. "People would give me tips and leads; knowing that I was a photographer, they’d call me up," said McNeill.

McNeill photographed the famous and the ordinary. He met "his subjects head on they take up the entire frame of the picture. Nothing distracts from the main event. The list of the famous includes Joe Lewis, Duke Ellington, Hattie McDaniel, Ella Fitzgerald, Eleanor and Franklin Roosevelt. He caught Bill "Bojangles" Robinson in action from the wings of the Earle Theater because he could not purchase a ticket in the front row. He captured the opening of the T Street Post Office in Washington, the first with an all-black staff, and the opening of the Washington bureau of the National Association for the Advancement of Colored People. He was present and recorded the confirmation of William Hastie as governor of the Virgin Islands. He documented the growing civil rights movement in the 1940s.

During World War II, McNeill served in an ammunition ordinance company (594th Am Ord Co), which was a very common posting for African American troops; he was stationed in Alabama and Guadalcanal much of which time he spent as the First Sergeant of his all African-American company. He left the Army in 1945 as a Second Lieutenant having been commissioned at the very end of the war. He also compiled a personal photographic record of his experiences in the Army.

When he returned to Washington, he resumed his photo business, McNeill News Photo Service. He was commissioned by the United Negro College Fund to document the post-war veterans’ education programs at eleven Negro colleges.

=== Government employment ===
In 1950, McNeill became a government photographer for the Department of Defense. In 1956, James Steven “Steve” Wright brought McNeill to the U.S. Department of State as a portrait photographer. Wright had started as a chauffeur-messenger in the Federal Emergency Administration of Public Works, but Hyman Greenberg, recognizing his talent as a photographer, hired Wright first as a “photographic assistant” and quickly changed it to assistant photographer. Greenberg and others helped break down racial barriers for Wright and by 1954, Wright had become Photographic Branch Chief of Audio Visual Division, at the Department of State. McNeill was a direct beneficiary of Wright's policy of giving out assignments to whoever was available at any given time, which gave all of the photographers equal opportunity in the department. McNeill eventually succeeded Wright as Photographic Branch Chief and retired from the Department of State in 1978 in that position. As a portrait photographer at State, McNeill is credited with creating the official portraits of Secretaries of State Dean Rusk, Henry Kissinger, and Cyrus Vance.

In 1997, McNeill was selected as Photographer of the Year by the Fotocraft Camera Club of Washington. In 1998 he received the Maurice Sorrell Lifetime Achievement Award from the EXPOSURE GROUP, African American Photographers Association.

== Exhibitions ==
In recent years, McNeill's photographs have been widely exhibited due largely to the efforts of MacArthur Fellowship Award Winner Deborah Willis, who, while working with the Smithsonian's African-American Museum Project, recognized McNeill's artistry and vision.

His work was presented in 1983 and 1984 in A Century of Black Photographers, a national traveling exhibit sponsored by the Rhode Island Institute of Design.

In 1985, his photographs were shown in Chicago and Los Angeles as a part of the exhibit The Black Photographer: An American View. In Washington, DC, his work was exhibited at the Sumner School in 1989 and at the Smithsonian Institution's Anacostia Museum in 1991.

His work was also a part of the 1992 exhibit To Achieve These Rights, a photographic essay on desegregation in Washington.

In 1994 and 1995, his photographs were featured in the exhibit Free Within Ourselves, at the National Museum of American Art.

In 1996, a large body of his work was featured in Visual Journal, a major exhibition of the Smithsonian's Center for African American History and Culture.

In fall 1997, McNeill's photographs of his boyhood neighborhood formed a major part of the Washington Historical Society's Remembering “U” Street street arts project.

His photographs of Washington in the 1930s and 40s have been featured in local television documentaries and on Black Entertainment Television, and were the focus of a German public television documentary in early 1998. His 1938 photograph “Make a Wish” and a 1938 photograph of a farmer worker, which was taken for the WPA project The Negro in Virginia, are part of the Smithsonian's “Oh Freedom! Teaching African American Civil Rights through American Art at the Smithsonian” Web site. These and other McNeill photographs can be seen in the catalog of the Smithsonian American Art Museum.

McNeill's photographs were a significant resource for The Washington Post Magazine's feature Backlight, which highlights unique moments in Washington history.

McNeill spoke and lectured on Washington during the 1930s and 40s, including an appearance on National Public Radio. He had also been a lecturer and photo competition judge for the Greater Washington Council of Camera Clubs.

The most recent projects featuring his photography are:

- Posing Beauty: African American Images from the 1890s to the Present, Deborah Willis’ book and traveling exhibit, which opened at the Tish School of the Arts, New York University (October 2009) and closed at the Virginia Museum of Fine Arts (July 2014).
- Smithsonian Museum of American Art: African-American Art: Harlem Renaissance, Civil Rights Era, and Beyond, April 27 – September 3, 2012

His photographs are also featured in the Museum of Modern Art's exhibit One-Way Ticket: Jacob Lawrence’s Migration Series and other Visions of the Great Movement North, April 3–September 7, 2015.

A selection of McNeill's work is on exhibit at the Virginia Museum of Fine Arts in Richmond. The show is Robert McNeill 1938: A Collective Portrait of African American Life in Virginia and runs from November 16, 2019 to May 26, 2020.

== Personal life ==
Robert H. McNeill died on May 25, 2005, of complications of diabetes. McNeill was married three times. His first marriage ended in divorce and he was widowed twice. He had two children, Robert McNeill Jr. and Susan McNeill.
