= New Negro Alliance =

Former civil rights group

The New Negro Alliance (NNA) was a civil rights group based in Washington, D.C. and formed in 1933. Founded by John Aubrey Davis Sr., members continued to use direct and legal action to demand equal employment opportunities into the late 1940s.

== History ==
After a small hamburger restaurant in Washington, D.C. fired all its Black employees in 1933, activists picketed the restaurant. John Aubrey Davis organized the first picket and boycott which led to a quick rehiring of the fired Black workers. The New Negro Alliance was created out of this initial action. The goal of the organization was to challenge Jim Crow laws.

Founders of the new group included Davis, Dutton Ferguson, William H. Hastie and James Nabrit Jr. The organization attracted members of the professional class, with "leading school teachers, administrators, lawyers, and doctors carrying picket signs." Other influential members of the NNA included Mary McLeod Bethune, Mary Church Terrell and Walter Washington.

Members of the organization continued to use economic pressure and negotiation tactics to force businesses to hire Black workers. The peaceful pickets and boycotts were not segregated and anyone who was sympathetic to the cause were welcome to take part. Some of the campaigns were: "Don't Buy Where You Can't Work," and "Jobs for Negroes."

Legal methods were used by business owners to prevent the NNA from picketing in front of their stores. The NNA pursued a legal battle that led to the 1938 Supreme Court decision, New Negro Alliance v. Sanitary Grocery Co.

The NNA also held mass meetings which featured keynote speakers discussing civil rights topics. The organization published a weekly newspaper, New Negro Opinion, between 1933 and 1937.

After 1940, the NNA was less successful in using boycotts to put pressure on businesses. These losses led to the eventual end of the NNA. Efforts to picket continued through 1948.

== See also ==
- New Negro Alliance v. Sanitary Grocery Co.
