= Calvin W. Hendrick =

American engineer (born 1865)

Calvin Wheeler Hendrick
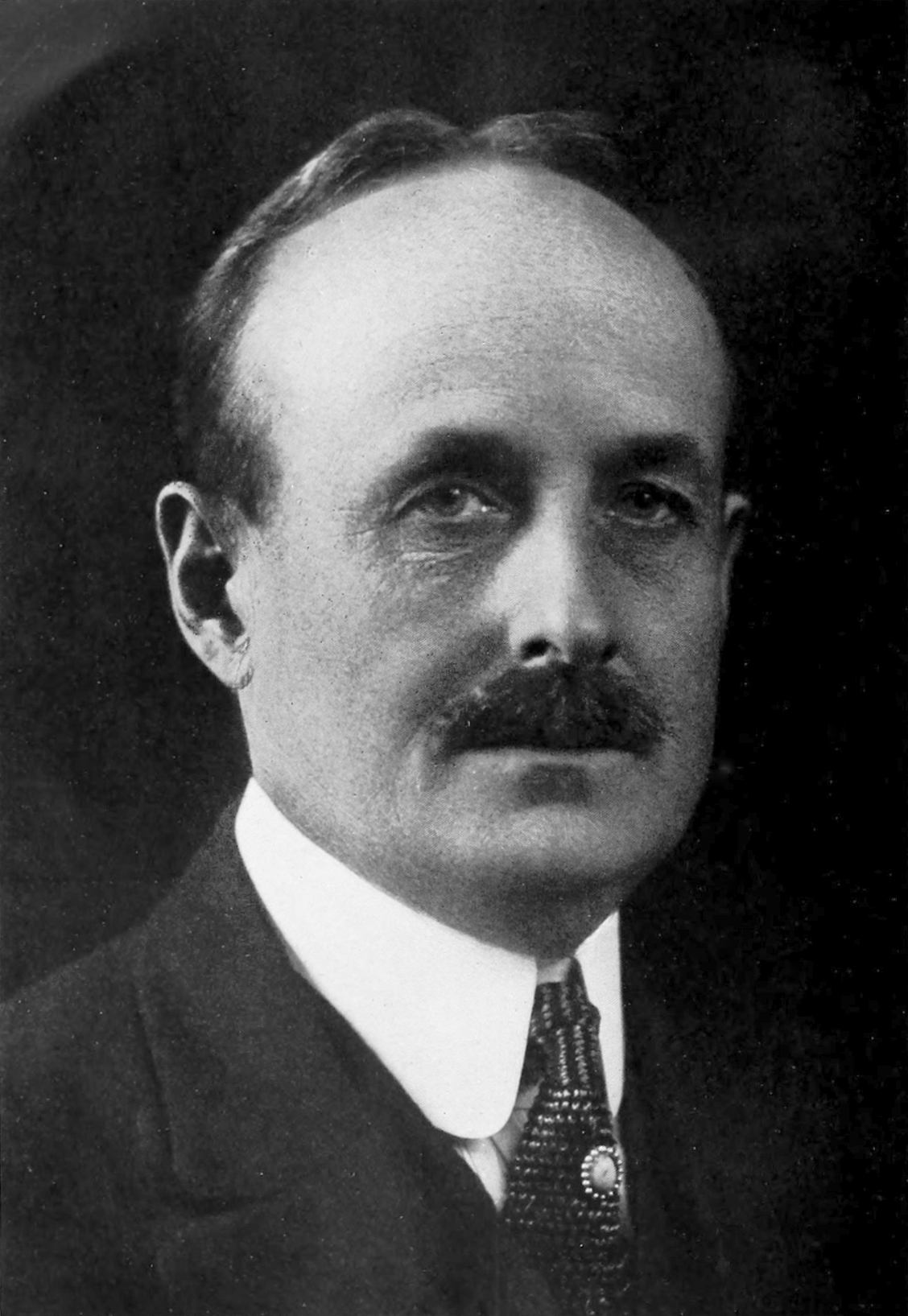
- Hendrick in 1914 publication
- Born: June 21, 1865; Paducah, Kentucky, U.S.
- Died: June 22, 1940 (aged 75); Miami, Florida, U.S.
- Occupation: Engineer
- Known for: Building sewage systems of New York City and Baltimore
- Spouse: Sarah Rebecca Herring (m. 1893)
- Children: 3

Signature
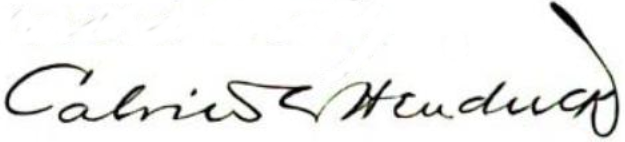

Calvin Wheeler Hendrick (June 21, 1865 – June 22, 1940) was an American engineer known for his work building the sewage systems of New York City and Baltimore.

== Early life ==
Calvin Wheeler Hendrick was born on June 21, 1865, in Paducah, Kentucky, to Elizabeth Winston (née Campbell) and Calvin Stiles Hendrick. His father was a Presbyterian minister and died when Hendrick was an infant. Edmund Winston was one of his ancestors. At the age of sixteen, Hendrick joined the rodman engineer corps on the Chesapeake, Ohio and Southwestern Railroad. He served in this role from 1881 to 1883. He was promoted from transit man to assistant engineer, and served in that role from 1883 to 1885. After the railroad was completed, Hendrick continued under instruction of Collis P. Huntington. Hendrick then worked at the engineering department, building granite pavements, in Louisville, Kentucky, as an assistant city engineer from 1883 to 1885.

== Career ==
Hendrick served as an engineer of Chess-Carley Oil Company of Kentucky from 1885 to 1886. Hendrick was appointed assistant to the chief engineer of the Georgia Southern and Florida Railway and worked on the construction of the line from 1886 to 1887. In 1888, Hendrick was elected city engineer of Macon, Georgia. He remained in that role for five or six years. While in Macon, Hendrick served as director of the Macon Construction Company, engineer for the city railway, director of the St. Augustine and North Beach Railroad and co-receiver of the Macon, Dublin and Savannah Railroad from 1887 to 1892. While in Macon, Hendrick was appointed receiver of the Savannah and Western Railroad by Judge Emery Spear. Hendrick declined a reappointment to the role of city engineer and moved to New York City to form a partnership with William Henry Wells as a consulting engineer at 4 Wall Street. He also worked with Samuel B. Schieffelin with milling property.

Hendrick was selected by William Barclay Parsons, the engineer-in-chief of the New York City Subway, to assist in making surveys and sewer studies. He worked as a consulting engineer and division engineer from 1892 to 1898. In 1900, Hendrick was appointed engineer of sewers, the individual in charge of all sewer construction. He was the youngest division engineer on the staff. In November 1903, the construction began. Hendrick, at one point, declined the opportunity to construct the US$10,000,000 sewage system in Havana, Cuba.

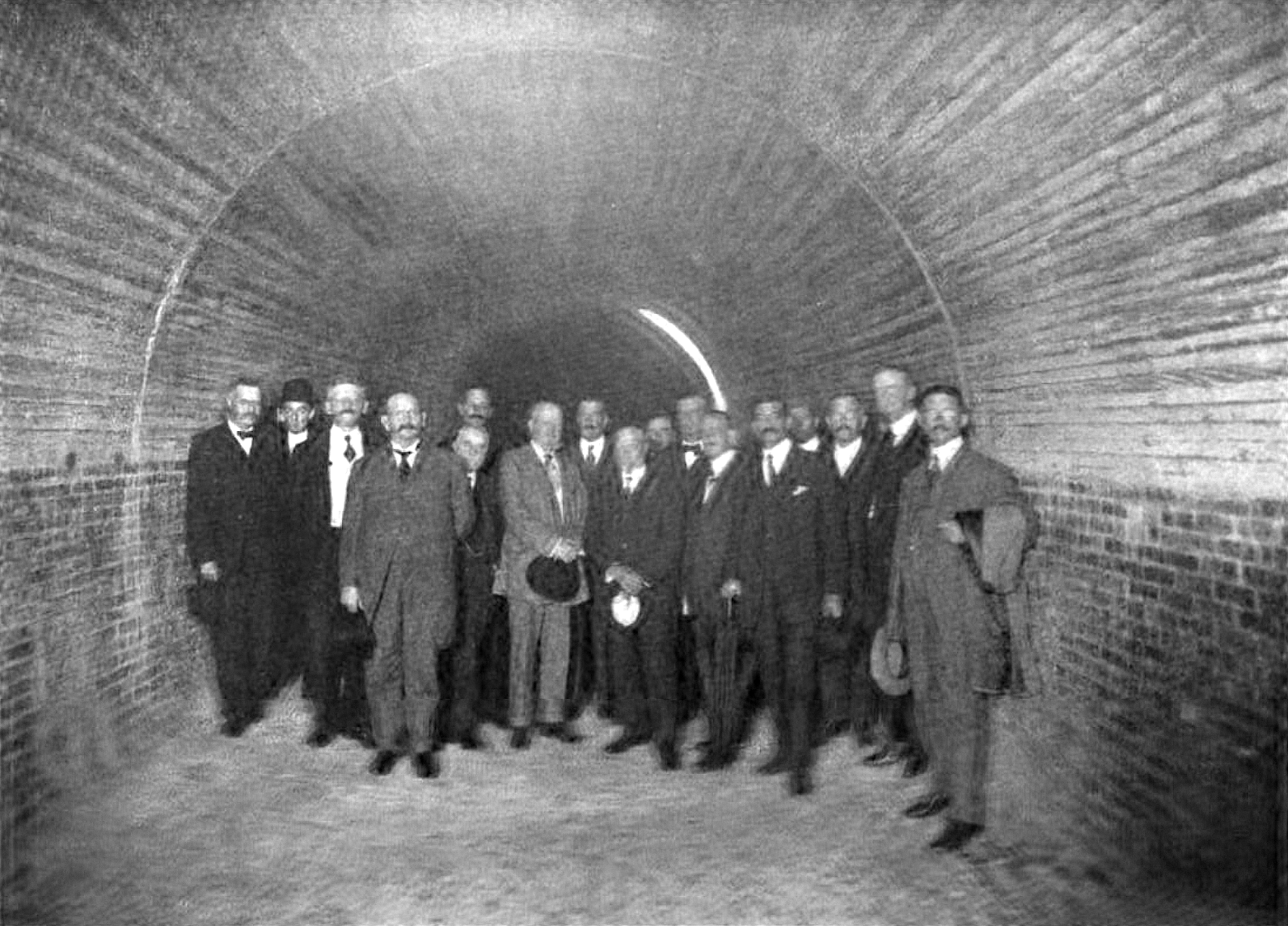
Maryland Governor, Sewage Commission, financiers and Hendrick in Outfall Sewer in Baltimore (c. 1909)

On November 4, 1905, Hendrick was elected unanimously as chief engineer for the construction of the Baltimore sewage system. He was awarded an annual salary of US$10,000. Hendrick drew plans for a union station of all trains in Baltimore. Mayor E. Clay Timanus appointed Hendrick a member of the commission to plan the facility. Hendrick also proposed using Jones Falls as a storm water drain system. In 1908, Hendrick was appointed by Governor Edwin Warfield to serve on the National Drainage Association. He was a member on the Smoke and Abatement Commission and the Commission on City Plan of Baltimore. Hendrick served as city engineer of the city sewer commission. He oversaw the work done by Noel Construction Company for the city sewage system. The construction of the Eastern Avenue Pumping Station began in 1908 and it was postponed for four months while Hendrick, Mayor James H. Preston and the city's building inspector argued about the material for the building's foundation and its depth. The city sewer system cost US$1,600,000 and included three huge pipes and a tunnel. Four people died on the project and it was completed on June 4, 1914.

Hendrick worked as city sewerage and city consulting engineer for Baltimore. His combined salary was US$14,000 a year, the highest paid city official in Baltimore at that time. He then entered private business in Baltimore.

Hendrick was chairman of the National Association for the Prevention of the Pollution of Rivers and Waters. He was also a member of the Commission of One Hundred on National Health of New York City, the American Society of Civil Engineers, the American Association for the Advancement of Science, the Southern Society of New York and the Society of Colonial Wars. He was also a member and served as chairman of the American Public Health Association.

=== Selected works ===
- "Colossal Work in Baltimore", National Geographic, 1909
- "Activated-Sludge Experiments at the Sewage Disposal Plant, Baltimore", The Journal of Industrial and Engineering Chemistry, July 1916

== Personal life ==
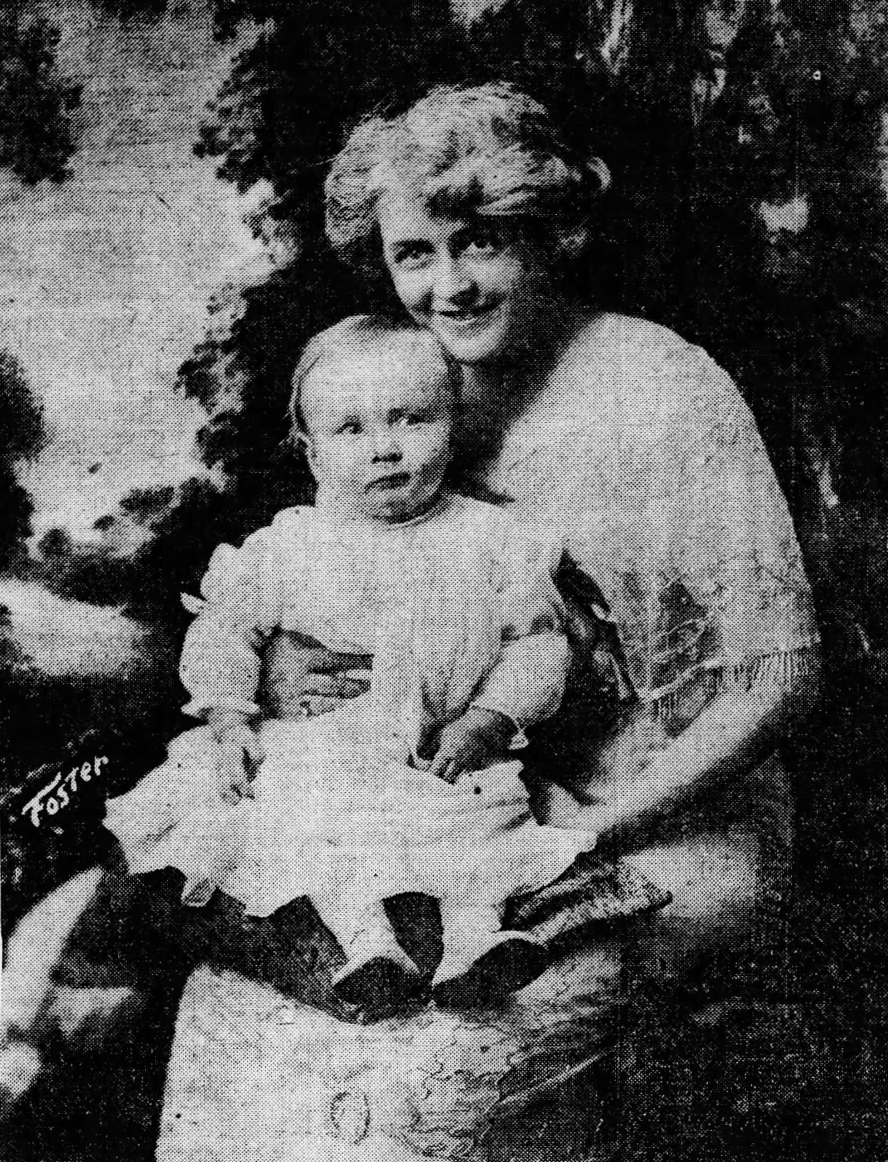
Mrs. Hendrick and son John Vivian Hendrick

Hendrick married Sarah Rebecca Herring, daughter of William F. Herring, of New York in Macon on November 28, 1893. They had three sons, Calvin Jr., Herring de la Porte and John Vivian.

While in Macon, Hendrick was a deacon of the First Presbyterian Church. Hendrick was an elder at First Presbyterian Church on Fifth Avenue in New York City and elder at First Presbyterian Church in Baltimore. Hendrick had a home at 1024 North Calvert Street in Baltimore and a summer home in Brooklandville, Maryland.

He died at his home in Miami on June 22, 1940.

== Legacy ==
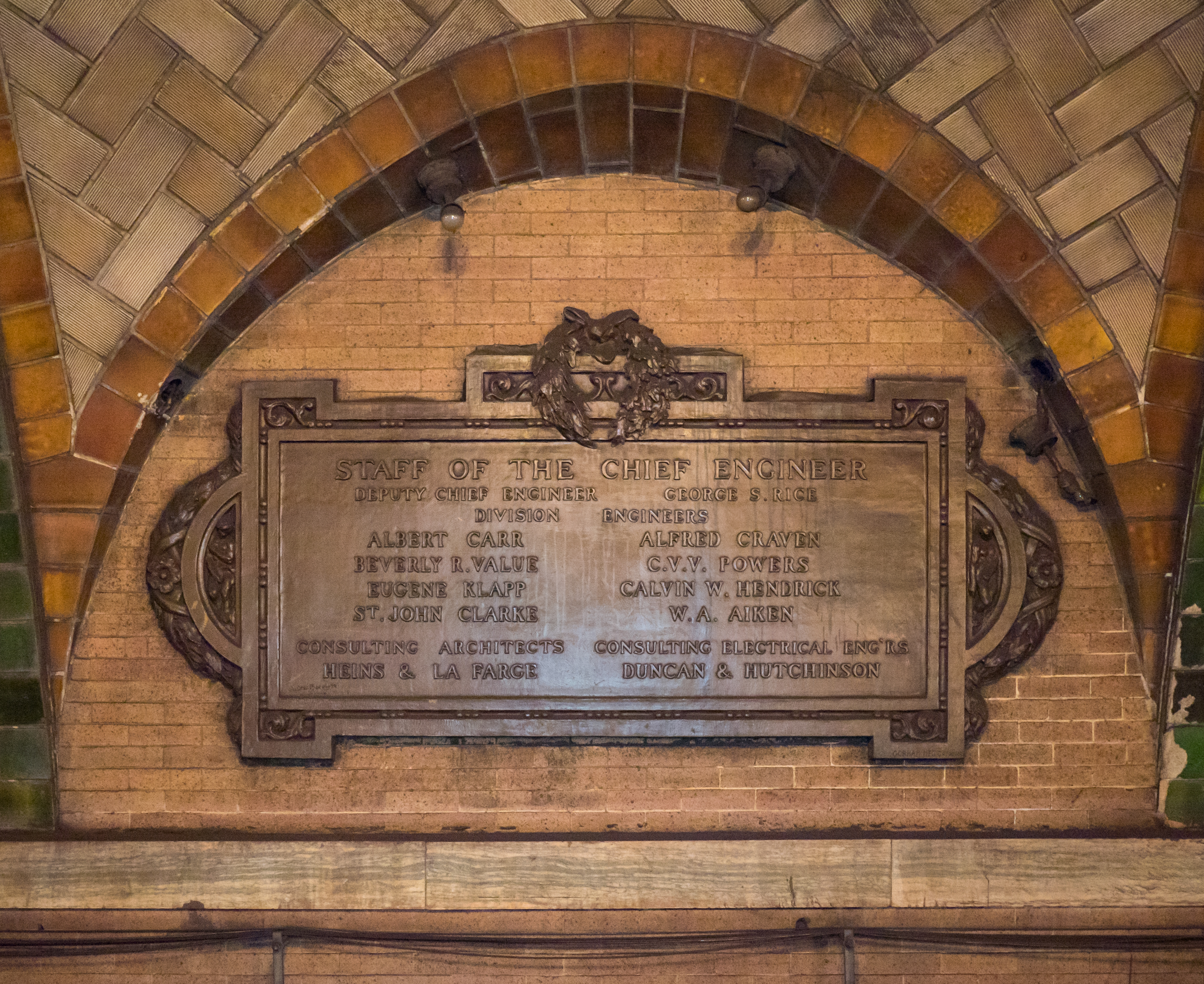
Plaque in City Hall station

Hendrick's name is on a bronze tablet in the City Hall subway station in New York City commemorating his work.
