= George W. F. McMechen =

African-American lawyer (1871–1961)

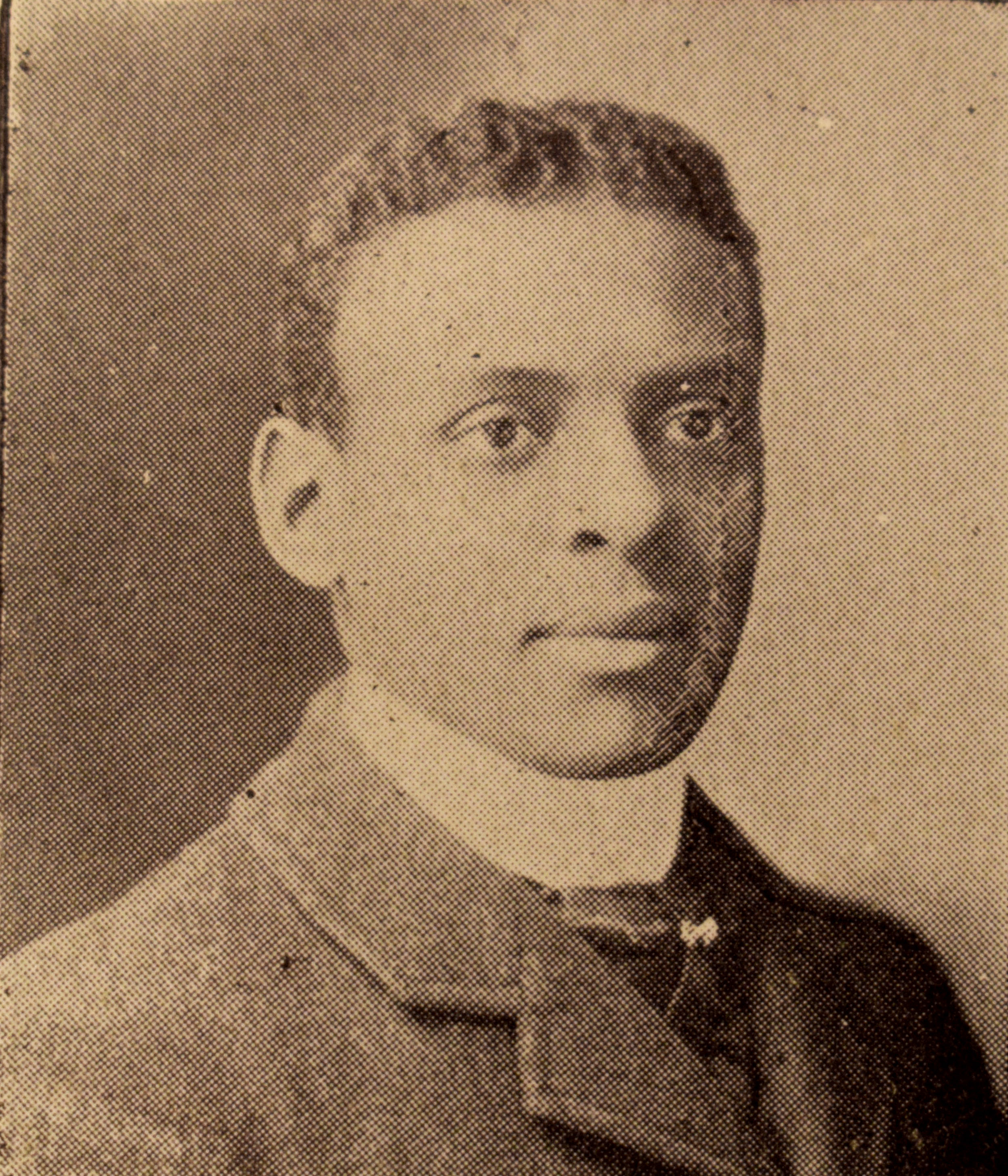
Image of George McMechen

George W. F. McMechen (October 29, 1871 - February 22, 1961) was a prominent African-American lawyer in Baltimore, Maryland. Along with his brother-in-law William Ashbie Hawkins he was a leading advocate for African-American civil rights.

McMechen was born in Wheeling, West Virginia on October 29, 1871, to George and Mildred McMechen. He had five sisters - Ada, Emma, Mary, Lelia and Ethel, and one brother, Harry Blaine.

In 1891, McMechen enrolled in the first class of what is now Morgan State University where he received his bachelor's degree. In 1895, he enrolled in and received a law degree from Yale Law School. He first began his law practice in Evansville, Indiana.

He married Anna Lee Mason of Sparta, Illinois in 1900 and they had four daughters: Mildred, Edythe, Katherine, and Georgeanna. In 1904 he moved to Baltimore and was admitted to the Maryland bar, where he ran a practice with William Ashbie Hawkins until Hawkins died in 1941. Hawkins purchased the residential property of 1834 McCulloh Street in northwest Baltimore. Thrusting himself into the national spotlight as a civil rights activist working towards gains in equal access to quality neighborhoods, more modernly recognized as Fair Housing, the McMechen family, in May 1910, took up residence there by leasing the property from his partner Hawkins. The McMechens became the first family of African ancestry to move onto a block where European immigrants had previously been the majority. Despite constant threats, harassment, violence and repeated acts of vandalism perpetrated by some of their intolerant neighbors, which included forming a neighborhood improvement association, the McMechen family, and four others of African ancestry, refused to cower or leave their residences.

McMechen's own words in a December 1910 New York Times Sunday Magazine article entitled, Baltimore Tries Drastic plan Of Race Segregation:

"As for property deteriorating on account of our advent into that neighborhood, I know it cannot be so, because all of us are paying higher rentals than the white occupants who immediately preceded us, and there is no better criterion of value than the rent a property brings. I have lived now for several months with white people next door to me on either hand, and we have never had the slightest difficulty. I do not try to associate with them socially any more than they with me, and I am sure none of us have any such desire, nor will any attempt be made on my part."

"This new ordinance, whether constitutional or not, will do more to injure the white man then the colored man, because as I say, we colored people only rent the houses in the white districts which it has been found impossible to rent to white people. The landlords must needs to have their houses vacant hereafter -- unless they can compel the framers of the ordinance to fill them!"

"As to the ordinance in question, it is my opinion as a lawyer that it is clearly unconstitutional, unjust and discriminating against the negro, although on its face it appears equally fair to white and black. But there never has been and there never will be any houses erected here in Baltimore exclusively for negro occupancy -- outside of some small hovels in the alleys. The consequence is that we, who desire comfortable quarters, and have the ability to pay for them, are compelled to seek the houses abandoned by the whites. This is all that is left for us to do."

Using a special and broad provision found in Baltimore's founding Charter of 1796, designed to grant police powers to the city, Baltimore City Councilman, Samuel L. West sponsored, and Mayor J. Barry Mahool signed into law, Baltimore City legislation in the form of the Segregation Ordinance, forbidding citizens of African ancestry from moving to blocks that were more than 50% white, and vice versa. The city government pioneered statutes that legally sanctioned segregation in housing. Hawkins sued the city of Baltimore and won, and eventually in 1917 the Supreme Court ruled the Segregation Ordinance to be illegal.

In 1915, McMechen ran the Baltimore City Council seat for the 14th district, however, he lost. From 1921 to 1939, he was on the governing board of Morgan State University. He was also the first African-American on the board of school commissioners of Baltimore, serving from 1944 to 1950. McMechen also served as a board member of the Morgan Corporation upon the state takeover of the college in 1939. Mayor Thomas D'Alesandro III appointed him to the Advisory Committee to the Baltimore Charter Revision Committee.

McMechen retired in 1955 and died on February 22, 1961. The business and economics building at Morgan State University is named for him. There is also a high school in Baltimore City named for him.

== Sources ==
- Smithsonian article on his nephew Red Thunder Cloud
- Maryland government article on McMechen
