= Murray v. Pearson =

Maryland Court of Appeals decision

- Court: Maryland Court of Appeals
- Decided: January 15, 1936
- Citation: 169 Md. 478, 182 A. 590 (1936)

Court membership
- Judges sitting: Bond, C. J., and Urner, Offutt, Parke, Sloan, Mitchell, Shehan, and Johnson, JJ

Case opinions
- Bond, joined by unanimous
- Decision by: Carroll Bond

Keywords
- Segregation

Murray v. Pearson was a Maryland Court of Appeals decision which found "the state has undertaken the function of education in the law, but has omitted students of one race from the only adequate provision made for it, and omitted them solely because of their color." On January 15, 1936, the court affirmed the lower court ruling which ordered the university to immediately integrate its student population, and therefore created a legal precedent making segregation in Maryland illegal.

== Circuit court case ==
Donald Gaines Murray sought admission to the University of Maryland School of Law on January 24, 1935, but his application was rejected on account of his race. The rejection letter stated, "The University of Maryland does not admit Negro students and your application is accordingly rejected." The letter noted the university's duty under the Plessy v. Ferguson doctrine of separate but equal to assist him in studying elsewhere, even at a law school located out-of-state. Murray appealed this rejection to the Board of Regents of the university, but was refused admittance.

The nation's oldest black collegiate fraternity, Alpha Phi Alpha, initiated Murray v. Pearson on June 25, 1935, as part of its widening social program, and retained Belford Lawson to litigate the case. By the time the case reached court, Murray was represented by Charles Hamilton Houston and Thurgood Marshall of the Baltimore National Association for the Advancement of Colored People (NAACP). Houston and Marshall used Murray v. Pearson as the NAACP's first case to test Nathan Ross Margold's strategy to attack the 'separate but equal' doctrine using the Equal Protection Clause of the Fourteenth Amendment to the U.S. Constitution. Margold concluded "such laws administering such a system were denying equal protection of law under the Yick Wo v. Hopkins ruling of 1886 and therefore were unconstitutional.

At the circuit court hearing, Marshall stated that Maryland failed to provide a 'separate but equal' education for Murray as required by the Fourteenth Amendment (using the legal standard at that time). Since laws differ from state to state, a law school located in another state could not prepare a future attorney for a career in Maryland. Marshall argued in principle that "since the State of Maryland had not provided a comparable law school for blacks that Murray should be allowed to attend the white university" and stated

What's at stake here is more than the rights of my client. It's the moral commitment stated in our country's creed.

The circuit court judge issued a writ of mandamus ordering Raymond A. Pearson, president of the university, to admit Murray to the law school.

== Appeal to Maryland Court of Appeals ==
The ruling was appealed to Maryland's highest court, the Court of Appeals. This court, in a unanimous decision, affirmed the lower court ruling in 1936. The decision did not outlaw segregation in education throughout Maryland, but noted the state's requirement under the Fourteenth Amendment, as it was understood at that time, to provide substantially an equal treatment in the facilities it provides from public funds. Since Maryland chose to only provide one law school for use by students in the state, that law school had to be available to all races.

== Impact of the decision ==
The decision of the Court of Appeals was never taken to the U.S. Supreme Court, and as such the ruling was not binding outside of Maryland; the Supreme Court addressed the same issue in 1938 in Missouri ex rel. Gaines v. Canada. The NAACP's legal strategy of attacking segregation by demanding equal access to public facilities that could not be easily duplicated was followed in later lawsuits with mixed results. In Williams v. Zimmerman, a case appealed to the Maryland Court of Appeals, Marshall in 1937 failed in an effort to desegregate a high school in Baltimore County, which had no public high schools for black teenagers. The legal strategy was successful in the desegregation of Baltimore's Baltimore Polytechnic Institute in 1952. It was not until 1954 that Brown v. Board of Education mandated desegregation across the whole of the United States. Brown also overturned the Plessy v. Ferguson 'separate but equal' standard as comporting with the Equal Protection Clause of the Fourteenth Amendment as used in Murray.

== See also ==
- Yick Wo v. Hopkins
- Missouri ex rel. Gaines v. Canada
- Brown v. Board of Education
- Hocutt v. Wilson
