= Ashbie Hawkins =

American lawyer (1862–1941)

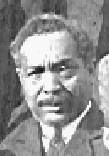
- Born: William Ashbie Hawkins; August 2, 1862; Lynchburg, Virginia, United States
- Died: April 3, 1941 (aged 78); Baltimore, Maryland, United States
- Education: Morgan State University; University of Maryland, College Park; Brown University
- Occupation: Lawyer
- Known for: African American lawyer, counsel for the Baltimore Branch of the NAACP
- Relatives: "Red Thunder Cloud" (grandson; born Cromwell Ashbie Hawkins West)

William Ashbie Hawkins (August 2, 1862 – April 3, 1941) was a lawyer in Baltimore, Maryland, who litigated prominent civil rights cases and was one of Baltimore's first African American lawyers.

== Early life and education ==
Hawkins was born in Lynchburg, Virginia, on August 2, 1862, to Reverend Robert and Susan Cobb Hawkins.

On March 14, 1885, he married Ada M. McMechen (b. 1867), also Virginia-born, in Baltimore with the Rev. Benjamin Brown officiating. They had two daughters, Aldina (Haynes; 1885-1940) and Roberta (West; b. 1891).
He graduated in 1885 from Centenary Biblical Institute (later to become Morgan College). He attended the University of Maryland School of Law, and was expelled in 1891 when the school resegregated. He completed his law degree at Howard University in 1892. After seven years as a public school teacher (1885-1892), Hawkins was admitted to the Maryland bar on January 29, 1897, and quickly set up his own law practice.

== Legal career ==
In about 1905, Hawkins joined forces with George W. F. McMechen (brother of his wife Ada M. McMechen) in the firm of Hawkins and McMechen which was headquartered initially at 327 St. Paul Street. The firm later moved to 21 E. Saratoga Street, and finally settled at 14 E. Pleasant Street beginning around 1920. The partnership lasted until Hawkins died in 1941.

=== Baltimore Chesapeake and Atlantic Railway Company ===
In 1910, the state of Maryland established the Maryland Public Service Commission and granted it power over common carriers. Similar in nature to the federal Interstate Commerce Commission, "...the primary concern of the Maryland Public Service Commission was rate regulation, but it also had power to hear complaints about service." Shortly after its establishment, W. Ashbie Hawkins represented several plaintiffs before the Public Service Commission protesting against the segregated conditions both in boats and trains under the Jim Crow law. In October 1911, Hawkins, outraged at poor sleeping and eating conditions for blacks on Chesapeake Bay ferryboats, took the Baltimore, Chesapeake and Atlantic Railway Company to court. Though his complaint was dismissed, the Public Service Commission did recommend, on February 13, 1912, that the company upgrade its facilities for blacks.

=== Baltimore Residential Segregation Ordinances of 1910–1913 ===
On May 15, 1911, Baltimore Mayor J. Barry Mahool, who was known as an earnest advocate of good government, women's suffrage, and social justice, signed into law, city ordinance No. 610 prohibiting African-Americans from moving onto blocks where whites were the majority, and vice versa. The two lawyers were central figures in battling the city's landmark segregation law, which was initially established in 1910. McMechen had moved into the 1800 block of McCulloh Street in northwest Baltimore, in a section that was still predominantly white. This perceived incursion was partially responsible for an effort by white Baltimoreans to institute a municipal, racial segregation law that was the first of its kind.

Hawkins' biggest professional mark came in 1917 before the U.S. Supreme Court in Buchanan v. Warley. He served as counsel to the Baltimore chapter of the National Association for the Advancement of Colored People and the Afro-American newspapers.

== Political career ==
In 1920, Hawkins was nominated by an independent group of African-American Republicans for United States Senate.

== Death ==
Hawkins died from heart disease on April 3, 1941, at Provident Hospital. He had been confined there for seven months, and his terminal sickness lasted for four years. He was buried at Mount Auburn Cemetery.

== Additional sources ==
This article draws extensively from the public domain information resources of the Maryland State Archives.
Maryland State Archives SPECIAL COLLECTIONS (Robert W. Schoeberlein Collection), "An Early History of the Baltimore Branch of the NAACP: 1912-1936." by George Derek Musgrove, May 1997. MSA SC 5354-2-1. Paper filed in Juanita Jackson Mitchell file, MSA SC 3520-2306, 2/11/11/38.
