= Renée H. Laurent =

American lawyer and academic administrator

- Laurent in 2021
- Other name: Renée McDonald Hutchins

Academic background
- Education: Spelman College (BA); Yale University (JD)

Academic work
- Discipline: Public interest law, criminal procedure
- Institutions: University of Maryland Francis King Carey School of Law; David A. Clarke School of Law

Renée Hutchins Laurent, formerly known as Renée McDonald Hutchins, is an American lawyer and academic administrator serving as the dean of the University of Maryland Francis King Carey School of Law since August 1, 2022.

== Life ==
Hutchins earned a bachelor's degree in mathematics from Spelman College. She earned a J.D. from Yale Law School. Afterwards, Hutchins clerked for the U.S. Court of Appeals for the Sixth Courth's Hon. Nathaniel R. Jones.

She worked as a lawyer in trials and appellate litigation. She joined the faculty at the New York University. She specializes on the Fourth Amendment to the United States Constitution, especially as it has been applied to people of color in the conduction of Terry stops. In 2004, Hutchins joined the faculty at the University of Maryland Francis King Carey School of Law. She served as its Jacob A. France Professor of Public Interest Law. In April 2019, she became the dean of the David A. Clarke School of Law at the University of the District of Columbia in 2019. In 2017, she was elected to the American Law Institute. On August 1, 2022, she returned to the Carey School of Law as dean. As dean, she helped not only the law students, but her community understand how the law system works and how the inside of the court room functioned.

== Selected works ==
- Simmons, Ric; Hutchins, Renée McDonald (2015). Learning Criminal Procedure. West Academic Publishing. ISBN 978-0-314-28670-3.
- Hutchins, Renée McDonald (2017). Developing Professional Skills, Criminal Procedure. West Academic. ISBN 978-1-63460-277-8.
