= Marjorie McKenzie Lawson =

First black female judge in Washington D.C.

- Born: 1912; Pittsburgh
- Died: October 11, 2002; Bethesda
- Education: University of Michigan, Terrell Law School, Columbia Law School
- Occupations: Lawyer, columnist, judge
- Spouse: Belford Lawson Jr.

Marjorie McKenzie Lawson (March 2, 1912 – October 11, 2002) was an African American attorney and judge who served on multiple federal commissions. Lawson's work as a lawyer focused on real estate development for urban renewal. She worked as the civil rights director for John F. Kennedy's 1960 presidential campaign, garnering endorsements from prominent Black community leaders and advising his policy decisions. In 1962 she was appointed by President Kennedy as an associate judge for the Juvenile Court of the District of Columbia, making her the first Black woman judge in the District. She was also appointed as the U.S. representative to the United Nations Economic and Social Council in 1965.

== Early life and education ==
Marjorie Alice McKenzie was born in Pittsburgh, Pennsylvania in 1912. Her parents were T. Wallace McKenzie and Gertrude Stiver McKenzie.

She earned two degrees at the University of Michigan: a bachelor's degree in 1933 and a Master of Social Work in 1934. After graduating from the University of Michigan, McKenzie moved to Washington, D.C. to attend the historically Black Terrell Law School, going on to graduate in 1939. After a white lawyer with an Ivy League education received a job she had also applied for, she went back to get another law degree at Columbia Law School, saying she wanted there to be no doubts about her legal credentials. She graduated from the Columbia Law School in 1950.

== Partnership with Belford Lawson Jr. ==
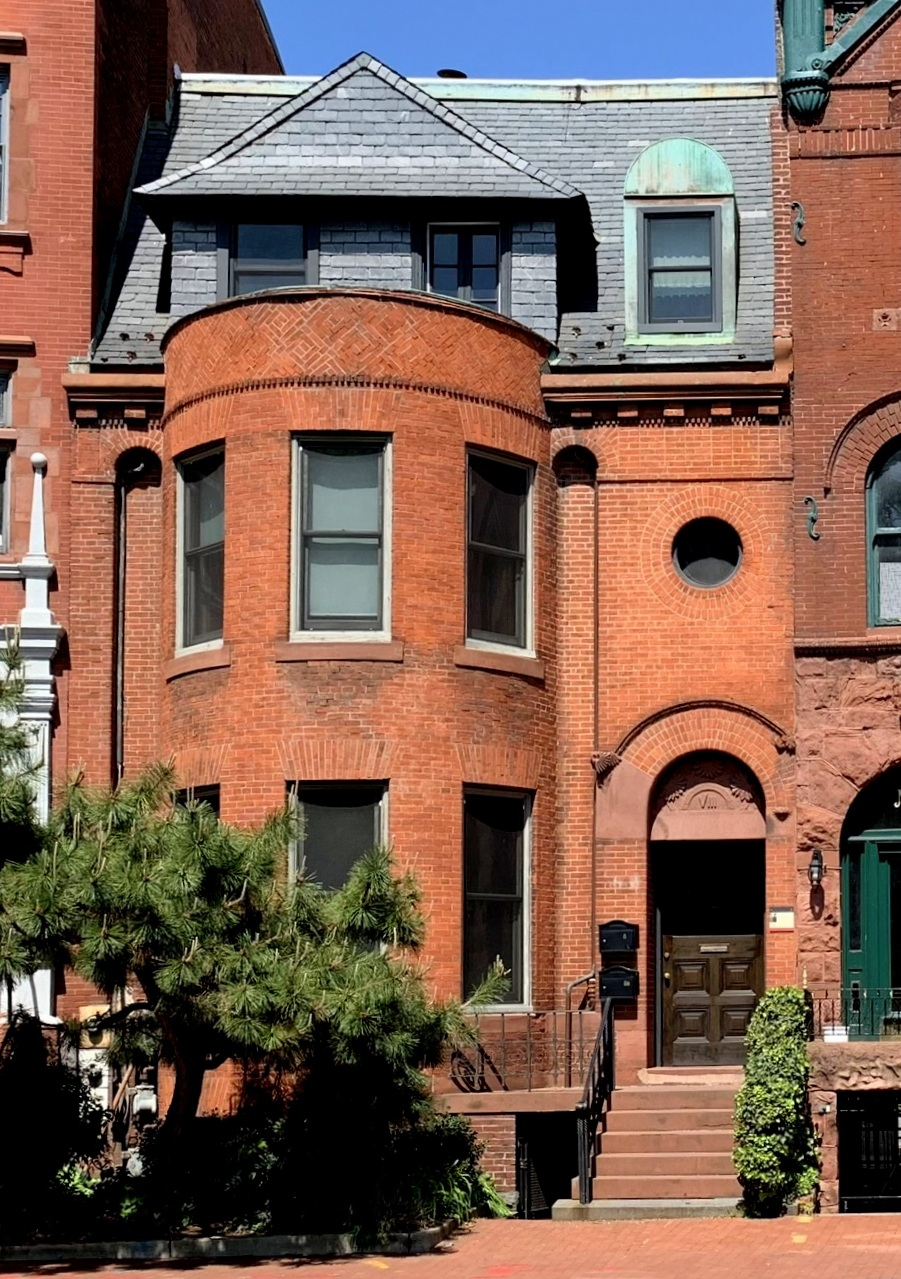
Marjorie and her husband, Belford, lived in this Logan Circle house from 1938 to 1958.

McKenzie met her husband, Belford Lawson Jr., while she was studying for her law degree at the Terrell Law School, where he was a teacher. They married in 1939 after her graduation. They would work on civil rights cases together throughout their careers. They had one child, Belford V. Lawson III, who would go on to become an attorney with the Federal Communications Commission. From 1938 to 1958, the Lawsons lived at 8 Logan Circle NW, at times renting their third floor to U.S. Representative Adam Clayton Powell Jr. Their residence is now part of Washington DC's African American Heritage Trail. In April 1954, Jet magazine reported that Lawson had filed for divorce, saying that her husband had been guilty of "extreme cruelty, mental in nature," which had impacted Lawson's health. They were remarried by 1957.

== Career ==
Lawson's career touched on multiple areas of civil rights law. Her focus was on real estate tax law and the development of federally subsidized housing, working on urban renewal projects that benefited African-American residents. Lawson was elected assistant secretary of the National Bar Association in 1939. She was the Assistant Director of the Division of Review and Analysis of the Fair Employment Practices Committee from October 1942 to October 1945. During the 1950s, she was the general counsel to the National Council of Negro Women. From 1941 until 1955 Lawson wrote a weekly public affairs column for the Pittsburgh Courier, covering federal policies relating to African Americans.

Lawson met John F. Kennedy around 1957, when her husband was approached by the Senator's staff to work within Boston's Black community in advance of Kennedy's 1958 senatorial reelection campaign. Belford did not want to leave his law practice, but suggested Marjorie would be the ideal person to manage that effort. She went on to represent Kennedy at national gatherings of Black religious, political, and women's organizations. She was selected to serve as the civil rights director for Kennedy's presidential campaign in 1960, connecting him with leading figures in the Black community and advising him on policy decisions for his platform.

In 1962, Kennedy appointed Lawson as an associate judge on the Juvenile Court of the District of Columbia, making her the first Black woman judge in the District of Columbia as well as the first Black woman appointed by a president to a judicial post. U.S. Attorney General Robert Kennedy attended Lawson's swearing in ceremony, delivering the commission from his brother. That same year, Lawson was also appointed to the President's Committee on Equal Employment Opportunity, established by Executive Order 10925 to investigate discrimination complaints.

In July 1965, she resigned from the Juvenile Court after Lyndon B. Johnson appointed her the vice chairman of the President's Commission on Crime in the District of Columbia (the District Crime Commission). Just a few months later, in September 1965, Johnson appointed her as the United States representative to the United Nations Economic and Social Council.

After that role ended, Lawson continued her work with urban renewal by cofounding the Model Inner City Community Organization, a citizens group advocating for the construction of public housing. She continued her practice in real estate law into the mid-1990s.

== Death ==
Lawson died at her home in Bethesda, Maryland on October 11, 2002.
