= Dutton Ferguson =

Former American civil servant (1904–1980)

- Born: 1904
- Died: 1980 (aged 75–76)
- Education: Howard University (BA, 1929)
- Occupations: Newspaper editor, civil servant, civil rights activist

Dutton Ferguson (1904-1980) was an American editor, civil servant and civil rights activist.

Ferguson graduated from Howard University in 1929. He was a member of the Omega Psi Phi fraternity.

Ferguson was a founding member of the New Negro Alliance. While picketing against unfair hiring practices, Ferguson was arrested with James Ward on September 26, 1933. Eventually, the court sided with lawyers who argued that the law against carrying picket signs was unequally enforced in the case of Ferguson and Ward.

By 1936, he was the editor of the Washington, D.C. Tribune. Ferguson was also an editor of Flash! magazine which ran between 1937 and 1939.

Starting in 1938, Ferguson served as an assistant to the Information Service of the Works Progress Administration (WPA). His position at the WPA involved Information Services where he worked as an editor, prepared layouts, and handled research requests. His office handled news releases for more than 250 Black newspapers throughout the country. Later, he went on to work at the government's Office of Price Administration.

Starting in 1942, Ferguson became an editor of Opportunity: A Journal of Negro Life. In 1947, he became the new editor-in-chief of Opportunity.

During the 1950s, Ferguson was involved in community and neighborhood revitalization in Washington, D.C. He worked with the Midway Civic Association.
