= Charles Harris (photographer) =

American photographer (1908–1998)

Charles "Teenie" Harris
- Born: July 2, 1908; Pittsburgh, Pennsylvania
- Died: June 12, 1998 (aged 89); Pittsburgh, Pennsylvania
- Occupation: Photographer
- Spouses: Ruth M. Butler (1927 – c. 1933); Elsa Lee Elliott (1944–1997)

Charles "Teenie" Harris (July 2, 1908 – June 12, 1998) was an American photographer from Pittsburgh, Pennsylvania. Harris was known for his photographs of residents and prominent visitors to Pittsburgh, including musicians and baseball players, which often appeared in the Pittsburgh Courier. His work is preserved in the permanent collection of the Carnegie Museum as a chronicle of mid-20th century life in Pittsburgh's African American communities.

== Biography ==
Harris was born in 1908 in Pittsburgh, Pennsylvania, United States, the son of hotel owners in the city's Hill District. Early in the 1930s he purchased his first camera and opened a photography studio. He freelanced for the Washington, D.C. news picture magazine Flash! From 1936 to 1975 Harris chronicled life in the black neighborhoods of the city for the Pittsburgh Courier, one of America's oldest black newspapers. Harris was nicknamed "One Shot" because he rarely made his subjects sit for retakes. Harris took more than 80,000 images during his career.

In addition to his photo essays of daily life in the city, he captured many celebrities who visited Pittsburgh, including Lena Horne, Harry Belafonte, Erroll Garner, Duke Ellington, Louis Armstrong, Little Richard and Ray Charles.

Harris also photographed legendary Negro league baseball players of the Homestead Grays and Pittsburgh Crawfords. Harris himself played baseball for the Crawfords when they were known as the Crawford Colored Giants.

In 1986 he licensed his collection of photographs for $3000 to a local entrepreneur, Dennis Morgan. Subsequently, these so-called "Morgan prints" were sold at street fairs in Pittsburgh. Harris filed a lawsuit in 1998 for unpaid royalties and the return of his collection. He won the case posthumously.

Harris died in 1998.

== Legacy ==
Harris' work was rarely seen outside of Pittsburgh until after his death.

In 2001, the Carnegie Museum of Art purchased Harris' collection of 80,000 negatives from his estate. Since 2003, the museum has scanned and cataloged nearly 60,000 images, many of which are available on the online collection database. Through outreach efforts, lectures and special events, and three Teenie Harris Archive Project exhibitions (in 2003, 2006, and 2009), the museum has asked for assistance in identifying the people, places, and events in the images. The Museum staged a retrospective of his work in 2012, and in 2020, opened a dedicated permanent exhibition of Harris' photographs titled In Sharp Focus: Charles ‘Teenie’ Harris.

Harris's work was included in the 2025 exhibition Photography and the Black Arts Movement, 1955–1985 at the National Gallery of Art.

== Books ==
- Stanley Crouch; Deborah Willis (2002). One Shot Harris: The Photographs of Charles "Teenie" Harris. New York: Harry N. Abrams, Inc. ISBN 0-8109-3272-5.

== See also ==
- Hill District (Pittsburgh, Pennsylvania)
