= New Negro Alliance v. Sanitary Grocery Co. =

New Negro Alliance et al. v. Sanitary Grocery Co.
- Supreme Court of the United States

Argued March 2–3, 1938 Decided March 28, 1938
- Full case name: New Negro Alliance et al. v Sanitary Grocery Co., Inc.
- Citations: 303 U.S. 552 (more) 58 S. Ct. 703; 82 L. Ed. 1012; 1938 U.S. LEXIS 367; 9 Fair Empl. Prac. Cas. (BNA) 464; 1 Lab. Cas. (CCH) ¶ 17,030; 2 L.R.R.M. 592

Case history
- Prior: 92 F.2d 510 (D.C. Cir. 1937); cert. granted, 302 U.S. 679 (1937).
- Subsequent: As amended by order of April 25, 1938, see 304 U.S.

Holding
- It was intended by the Congress that peaceful and orderly dissemination of information by those defined as persons interested in a labor dispute concerning 'terms and conditions of employment' in an industry or a plant or a place of business should be lawful.

Court membership
- Chief Justice Charles E. Hughes Associate Justices James C. McReynolds · Louis Brandeis; Pierce Butler · Harlan F. Stone; Owen Roberts · Benjamin N. Cardozo; Hugo Black · Stanley F. Reed

Case opinions
- Majority: Roberts, joined by Hughes, Brandeis, Stone, Black, Reed
- Dissent: McReynolds, joined by Butler
- Cardozo took no part in the consideration or decision of the case.

Laws applied
- Norris–LaGuardia Act sect. 13a

New Negro Alliance v. Sanitary Grocery Co., 303 U.S. 552 (1938), was a landmark decision of the US Supreme Court which affects US labor law, safeguarding a right to boycott and in the struggle by African Americans against discriminatory hiring practices. Sanitary Grocery Co. was at the time of the case owned by Safeway Inc.

== Arguments ==
The case was argued by Thurman L. Dodson and Belford V. Lawson, both members of the New Negro Alliance (NNA). Before this case, lower courts had largely denied Black organizations the right to "picket for the purpose of compelling race-based hiring."

== Judgment ==
The decision was a 6 to 3 majority in favor of the NNA.

The court concluded that according to the United States Congress "peaceful and orderly dissemination of information by those defined as persons interested in a labor dispute concerning 'terms and conditions of employment' in an industry or a plant or a place of business should be lawful; that, short of fraud, breach of the peace, violence, or conduct otherwise unlawful, those having a direct or indirect interest in such terms and conditions of employment should be at liberty to advertise and disseminate facts and information with respect to terms and conditions of employment, and peacefully to persuade others to concur in their views respecting an employer's practices."

== See also ==
- New Negro Alliance
- US labor law
- List of United States Supreme Court cases, volume 303
