= Bread and Cheese Creek =

River in Maryland

Coordinates: 39.2923299°N 76.4799620°W

Bread and Cheese Creek is a tributary of the Back River in Baltimore County, Maryland. The creek is 3.2 miles (5.1 km) long, with headwaters just east of the Baltimore city line. It flows east through Baltimore County before emptying into the Back River, which flows into the Chesapeake Bay. The watershed area of the creek is 1.85 square miles (4.8 km^{2}).

== History ==
The name Bread and Cheese Creek dates to colonial times in the 18th century and is of unknown origin. A source, however, states that it derived its name during the Battle of North Point during the War of 1812, when the stream was a resting spot for soldiers to eat their rations of bread and cheese.

Brigadier General John Stricker and his troops of 3,200 men made camp along Bread and Cheese Creek on the evening of September 11, 1814, waiting the British advance. On the morning of September 12, 1814, “scouts returned with the news that the British were advancing slowly and that General Ross, Rear-Admiral George Cockburn, and their staffs were eating breakfast at the Gorsuch farm. When Stricker’s officers heard that the British were enjoying themselves at Gorsuch’s, several of them volunteered to dislodge them.” According to popular legend, “Daniel Wells (age 18) and Henry G McComas (age 19) spotted General Ross having previously seen him at the Battle of Bladensburg on August 24, 1814.” They each took shelter behind some trees and “fired simultaneously." As Ross fell (struck through the arm and chest), the British troops fired at the smoke generated from their rifles, killing them both.

After the mortal shooting of Ross, the British under Colonel Arthur Brooke advanced through the Bouldin family farm to attack the American line anchored at the junction of North Point Road and Trappe Road. General Stricker's line consisted of the 27th, 5th, 39th and 51st regiments of Maryland Militia, supplemented with a company from Hagerstown and several companies of troops from Pennsylvania. The Battle of North Point lasted for several hours during the afternoon. Brooke sent his 4th Regiment of Foot in a flanking maneuver to unsettle the American left, which led to Stricker's 51st regiment and elements of the 39th regiment to retreat in some disorder. The remainder of the Americans traded volleys with the invaders until they eventually retreated in good order when their ammunition began to become low.

After 4 p.m., “The British, exhausted from a day of unexpected fighting, broke off the attack and bivouacked for the night along Bread and Cheese Creek.”

In the 1900s a dairy farm, “The Dundalk Dairy”, opened along a large portion of Bread and Cheese Creek. It operated for a number of years, but was purchased by the government in order to build Merritt Boulevard. In the early 1970s, a barn and a few other buildings as well as a small family cemetery were still visible, but crumbling. These were removed when Baltimore Gas and Electric (now Constellation Energy) put up high tension lines and Merritt Manor Shopping Center was built.

== Water quality issues ==
The Baltimore County Department of Environmental Protection and Resource Management (DEPRM) has classified Bread and Cheese Creek as having a “Very High Priority” for stormwater management actions, due to the large amount of trash and sediment found in it. The county recommends implementing a number of remedial activities to control urban runoff pollution, including "downspout disconnection, storm drain marking, buffer improvement, alley retrofit, street sweeping, tree planting and public education."

Clean Bread and Cheese Creek (CBCC) was founded in 2009 as an organization dedicated to improving the water quality and providing stewardship to this watershed. The group’s efforts include stream cleanups, resident education and advocacy. In the spring of 2010, an effort was made to restore the small Bread and Cheese Creek Bridge using environmentally friendly materials. Plagued by vandalism, the effort was discontinued.

== See also ==
- List of rivers of Maryland
