= Donald Gaines Murray =

American lawyer and civil rights activist (1914–1986)

- Born: May 24, 1914; Philadelphia, Pennsylvania, U.S.
- Died: April 7, 1986 (aged 72); Baltimore, Maryland, U.S.
- Education: Amherst College (BA); University of Maryland School of Law (LL.B)
- Occupation: Attorney
- Known for: Murray v. Pearson

Donald Gaines Murray (May 24, 1914 – April 7, 1986, in Baltimore, Maryland) was an American attorney, the first African-American to enter the University of Maryland School of Law since 1890 as a result of winning the landmark civil rights case Murray v. Pearson in 1935.

== Early life and education ==
Murray was born on May 24, 1914, in Philadelphia, the son of George Lee Murray and Cecilia Lillian Gaines Murray. He graduated from Frederick Douglass High School in 1929. Murray then earned a Bachelor of Arts degree from Amherst College in 1934.

=== Murray v. Pearson ===
Murray sought admission to the University of Maryland School of Law on January 24, 1935, but his application was rejected on account of his race, and his appeal to the Board of Regents of the university was unsuccessful. The case Murray v. Pearson was initiated by the Alpha Phi Alpha fraternity as part of its widening social program; however, Murray was not a member of the fraternity. The fraternity hired Belford Lawson, but by the time the case reached court, Murray was represented by Charles Hamilton Houston and Thurgood Marshall of the Baltimore National Association for the Advancement of Colored People (NAACP). Marshall argued the organization's policy of racial segregation was unconstitutional and argued in principle that "since the State of Maryland had not provided a comparable law school for blacks, Murray should be allowed to attend the white university." and stated

What's at stake here is more than the rights of my client. It's the moral commitment stated in our country's creed.

The Judge issued a writ of mandamus ordering Raymond A. Pearson, president of the university, to admit Murray to the University of Maryland Law School. The ruling was appealed to Maryland's highest court, the Court of Appeals, which affirmed the lower courts' rulings on January 15, 1936.^{[a]}

Murray was admitted to the University of Maryland School of Law; however, he was not in a position to pay for tuition and books. Alpha Phi Alpha fraternity paid Murray's tuition and books from the time of his admission to his graduation from law school.

== Career ==
Murray went on to practice law in Baltimore with the firm of Douglass, Perkins and Murray. He was involved in a number of cases which led to the removal of the color barrier from the University of Maryland graduate schools.

Murray was a member of the Baltimore Urban League, American Civil Liberties Union and Kappa Alpha Psi fraternity. He retired around 1971 and died at the age of 72 while in Baltimore's Lutheran Hospital after a lengthy illness.

== See also ==
- Murray v. Pearson
- Brown v. Board of Education

== Footnotes ==
a. The Murray v. Pearson decision was never taken to the U.S. Supreme Court, and as such the ruling was not binding outside of Maryland until 1954, when the results of Brown v. Board of Education mandated desegregation across the United States.
