= Bread and Cheese Day =

Bread and Cheese Day is observed by Canada's Six Nations Reserve on Victoria Day. The day is marked with speeches, games, and a gift of bread and cheese to members of the community.

== History ==
In appreciation of their allegiance to the British Empire during the American Revolution and the War of 1812, Queen Victoria began an annual tradition of giving gifts to the Six Nations community, namely blankets The custom ended with Victoria's death in 1901. In 1924, however, the Grand Council of the Six Nations decided to revive the practice, this time with gifts of bread and cheese, as a commemoration of the close ties between Six Nations and the British Crown.
