= J. Barry Mahool =

American politician (1870–1935)

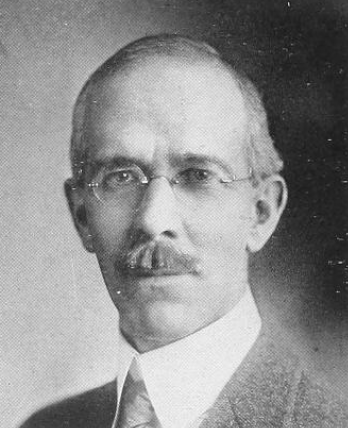

36th Mayor of Baltimore
- In office 1907–1911
- Preceded by: E. Clay Timanus
- Succeeded by: James H. Preston

Personal details
- Born: John Barry Mahool; September 14, 1870 Phoenix, Maryland, U.S.
- Died: July 29, 1935 (aged 64) Baltimore, Maryland, U.S.
- Party: Democratic

John Barry Mahool (September 14, 1870 – July 29, 1935) was the Mayor of Baltimore from 1907 to 1911.

== Biography ==
Mahool was born in Phoenix, Maryland on September 14, 1870. He became the Democratic nominee for Baltimore mayor in April 1907, defeating opponents John Charles Linthicum and George Stewart Brown. In May 1907, he defeated incumbent Republican mayor E. Clay Timanus.

In 1910, Mahool signed city ordinance No. 610 prohibiting African-Americans from moving onto blocks where whites were the majority, and vice versa. Mahool had been an advocate for social justice, championing causes such as woman's suffrage, but the ordinance came in response to an uproar after George W. F. McMechen, an African-American Yale law school graduate, moved into a rich (white) neighborhood. The ordinance was rapidly declared unconstitutional.

Mahool lost a re-election bid in 1911 in the primary, losing to James H. Preston.

Mahool died in Baltimore on July 29, 1935, nine days after suffering a fall in Ocean City, Maryland.
