= Essex Skypark =

Essex Airpark
- IATA: none; ICAO: none; FAA LID: W48

Summary
- Airport type: Public
- Owner: Baltimore County
- Operator: Essex Skypark Association
- Serves: Essex, Maryland
- Location: Essex, MD
- Elevation AMSL: 14 ft (4.3 m)
- Coordinates: 39°15.76′N 76°25.98′W
- Website: http://www.essexskyparkassn.org

Map
- Location of airport in Maryland

Runways
| Direction | Length | | Surface |
| Direction | ft | m | Surface |
|---|---|---|---|
| 16/34 | 2,081 | 634 | Asphalt |
| N/S | 3,000 | 914 | Water |

Statistics (2023)
- Aircraft operations (year ending 10/10/2023): 5,592
- Based aircraft: 33
- Source: Federal Aviation Administration. Coordinates from WikiMapia

Essex Skypark (IATA: W48) is a publicly owned general aviation airport and seaplane base located in Baltimore County, Maryland, United States, on the Back River Neck Peninsula off the Chesapeake Bay. It is approximately three miles southeast of Baltimore, Maryland and just south of Martin State Airport.

== Facilities ==
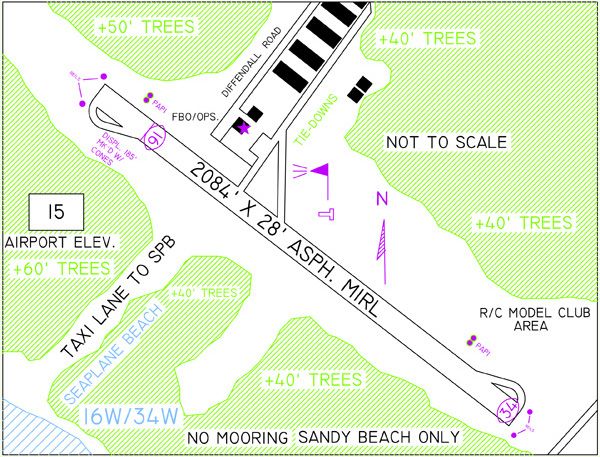
Airfield diagram

The 56 acre airport is surrounded by 588 acres of undisturbed and pristine wetlands and heavy forest. As the last light general aviation airport in Baltimore County, the airpark offers a 2,081 by 30 foot asphalt runway and a 3,000 by 300 foot water runway. Local aviation enthusiasts use it to fly single engine airplanes, ultralights, seaplanes, banner towing, and radio controlled aircraft.

Essex Skypark has been an operating public use airport for over 75 years.

== Early history ==
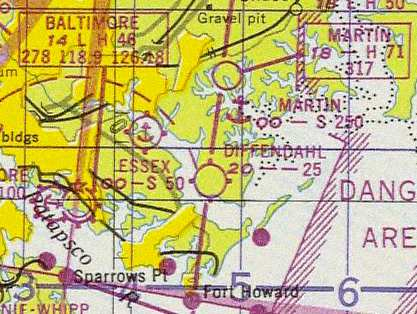
1946 USGS topo map incorrectly labels the airport as "Diffendall."

Aviation enthusiast William Diffendahl carved the airpark out of local farmland in the late 1930s and early 1940s. It was used by aviation enthusiasts from the working communities around the Baltimore Glenn L. Martin Company plant that built the Martin M-130 flying boat, the Martin B-26 Marauder bomber and other aircraft in the 1940s.

A 1947 Maryland Airport Directory listed the airport as having two intersecting grass runways: a north–south strip 2,200 feet in length and an east–west strip 1,800 feet in length. Buildings on the airport (which was owned and operated by Isabelle Diffendahl) included an administration building, a 44-foot by 60-foot hangar as well as eight t-hangars.

During its early years, the airport experienced significant growth, serving as a home base for more than 200 pilots. These pilots included crop dusters, air traffic reporters, commercial travelers, and exhibition pilots.

Sometime around 1949 the land was purchased by J. S. Shapiro and renamed Eastern Airport. The airport continued to flourish and prosper throughout the 1950s and 1960s, adding a seaplane base on adjacent Back River. By 1964, the longer of the two turf runways was paved and taxiways were added.

In 1967 the airport was renamed Essex Skypark. Many factors led to a decline in growth and revenues in the following years. By the 1970s however, things had stabilized.

== Recent history ==
In April 2000, using money from the Maryland Rural Legacy Program, Baltimore County bought the airport and surrounding 588 acres from the Shapiro Family for about $2.6M. The property came with a Maryland Environmental Trust easement that called for protecting the forest and wetlands and provided for the continued operation and use of the existing airport. Many different uses have been suggested for the site's future, such as creating a forest mitigation park to offset development elsewhere in the county, to a Chesapeake Wildlife Sanctuary and environmental research facility for Johns Hopkins University and the University of Maryland. In 2006, Baltimore County accepted a grant from the Maryland Aviation Administration to repave the runway, taxiways, and apron along with a 15-year commitment to keep the airport.

On 10 April 2012, the Essex Skypark Association purchased a 99-year lease for the 44 acre airfield and associated seaplane base on the Back River from Baltimore County. The Association assumed all responsibility for maintaining and operating the airfield under the terms of the lease.

A branch of the Civil Air Patrol and a model airplane club also use the facility. The lease allows the Association to host three public events or fly-ins a year, one of which is a "Wings & Wheels Fly-In" held every September that is open to the public.

Essex Skypark is home to a number of antique and experimental amateur built aircraft in addition to more modern aircraft. The Chesapeake Model Aircraft Association members fly their model aircraft from a small runway at the airport.

The airport is also the host for the Essex Skypark Science, Technology, Engineering and Mathematics (ESSTEM) Aviation Training Program. This is a approved 501.C.3 tax exempt non-profit (DLN 26053406002910) organization. The purpose of the ESSTEM is to provide base level aviation related education and skills training to young adults that desire to pursue a career in the aviation field. Educational programs include flight simulation training, hands on aircraft maintenance skills training, aviation seminars and one-on-one mentoring.
