= University of Maryland Francis King Carey School of Law =

Law school in Baltimore, Maryland, US

- Parent school: University of Maryland, Baltimore
- Established: 1824; 202 years ago
- School type: Public law school
- Dean: Renée M. Hutchins
- Location: Baltimore, Maryland, U.S. 39°17′22″N 76°37′22″W
- Enrollment: 705 (part- and full-time, JD, LLM, & MSL)
- Faculty: 59 full-time; 112 adjunct
- USNWR ranking: 62nd (tie) (2026)
- Bar pass rate: 85% (2021)
- Website: law.umaryland.edu
- ABA profile: Standard 509 Report

The University of Maryland Francis King Carey School of Law (formerly University of Maryland School of Law from 1924 to 2011) is the law school of the University of Maryland, Baltimore. It is located in Baltimore, Maryland. Founded in 1816, it is one of the oldest law schools in the United States.

The law school is fully accredited by the American Bar Association (ABA). It is a member of the Association of American Law Schools and has a chapter of the Order of the Coif honor society.

== History ==
Maryland Law was founded in 1816 as the Maryland Law Institute. David Hoffman is credited with founding the institute, and in 1817, he published his legal course Hoffman's Course of Legal Study. The school began regular instruction in 1824, and it is the fourth oldest law school in the United States.

John Prentiss Poe served as Dean of the school from 1871 until his death in 1909. Poe was a powerful conservative legal and political figure in Maryland, and a group of those opposed to him formed the Baltimore University School of Law in 1890. In 1900, a number of faculty from that school formed a new school, the Baltimore Law School. For a brief time, these schools were among the few law schools to admit women. The former admitted a single woman, Catherine Hunekel, and the Baltimore Law School admitted women and graduated four of them before banning them in 1907. In 1911, those schools reconsolidated, and in 1913 the combined school merged with the University of Maryland School of Law. The University of Maryland finally admitted women to law school in 1920, though they were forced to use the restrooms across the street at the medical school. Five women graduated in 1923.

After the law school denied admission to black applicant Donald Gaines Murray on account of his race, in 1936 the Maryland Court of Appeals ruled that the law school must admit him in the case of Murray v. Pearson.

In 2002, the law school moved into a facility in downtown Baltimore near the Inner Harbor and Oriole Park at Camden Yards.

In 2011, the University of Maryland School of Law received a US$30 million donation from the W.P. Carey Foundation, the largest gift in the law school's history. In response, the law school changed its name to the University of Maryland Francis King Carey School of Law.

== Student body ==
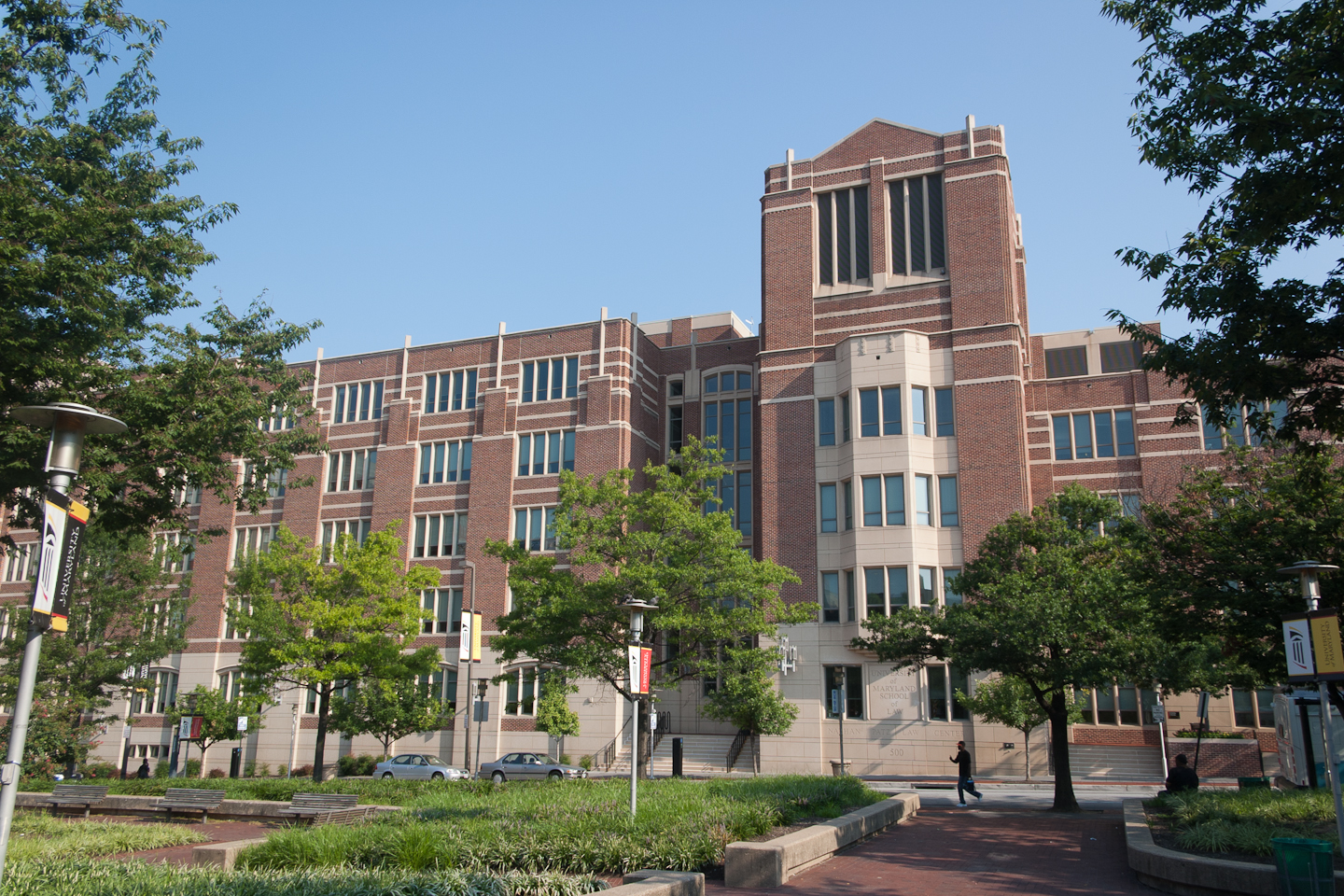

Maryland Law has approximately 650 students enrolled in its Juris Doctor (J.D.) program. The racial makeup of students in the J.D. program is approximately 59.2% white, with about 38.6% identifying as a minority race (and the remainder are unknown or did not specify). The average age of the incoming class was 25 in 2025. There are more than 40 student organizations, four specialized legal centers, and five law journals.

In 2025, Maryland Law enrolled 229 students into its first-year J.D. class, including 208 full-time students and 21 part-time students. The median LSAT score was 164, and the median undergraduate GPA was 3.72. The law school accepted approximately 36% of its applicants.

== Rankings ==
The law school was ranked tied for 62nd by U.S. News & World Report in 2026. The 2026 edition ranked Maryland Law tied for 13th in part-time programs, tied for 6th in health care law, tied for 18th in environmental law, tied for 8th in dispute resolution, tied for 8th in clinical training, tied for 47th in business/corporate law, tied for 40th in constitutional law, tied for 51st in contracts/commercial law, tied for 76th in intellectual property law, tied for 31st in criminal law, and tied for 66th in legal writing.

== Bar passage and employment outcomes ==
According to Maryland Law's official data reported to the American Bar Association, approximately 77% of Maryland Law graduates who took the bar exam for the first time in 2019 passed. In addition, 94% of 2019 J.D. graduates were employed in some capacity ten months after graduation. These 2019 graduates became employed in a variety of contexts, including approximately 35% in judicial clerkships (4% federal clerkships and 31% state and local clerkships), 23% in government, 20% in private practice, 11% in business and industry, 5% in public interest, and 4% in education. For 2018 J.D. graduates who entered private practice within ten months of graduation, the median starting salary was $80,000.

== Costs ==
During the 2019-2020 academic year, tuition and fees for full-time J.D. students were $32,808 for Maryland residents and $48,426 for out-of-state students. For part-time J.D. students, tuition and fees were $21,538 for Maryland residents and $31,704 for out-of-state students. The estimated total cost of attendance for J.D. students, which includes tuition and fees, living expenses, transportation expenses, book expenses, and health insurance, was $61,745 for full-time students who are Maryland residents, $79,277 for full-time out-of-state students, $45,123 for part-time students who are Maryland residents, and $56,972 for part-time out-of-state students. In addition, 77% of students received a scholarship or grant from Maryland Law, including 78% of full-time students and 74% of part-time students.

== Academics ==
=== Curriculum ===
==== Core ====
The core curriculum at Maryland Law for J.D. students includes courses in civil procedure, constitutional law, torts, property, contracts, and criminal law, as well as a two-semester sequence of courses focusing on legal skills of analysis, research, writing, and oral argument. After completing these initial courses, students are required to complete additional coursework in constitutional law, ethics, and legal research, and satisfy experiential and writing requirements. This core curriculum forms the basis for more specialized study through more than 150 elective courses, seminars, independent studies, simulations, clinics, and externships.

The LL.M. degree program is designed for students who have earned a prior law degree, either a J.D. degree from a law school in the United States or a law degree from a school in another country. Students must complete coursework in a specialty field and may choose to write a thesis. LL.M. students who did not earn a prior law degree in an American law school must take a course on introductory American law, but otherwise, no specific courses are required for LL.M. students.

==== Specialty programs ====
Maryland Law is home to several specialty programs that enable students to explore areas of interest through experiential learning and a specialized curriculum. The main specialty areas include:

- Alternative Dispute Resolution
- Business Law
- Clinical Law
- Cybersecurity and Crisis Management
- Environmental Law
- Health Care Law
- Intellectual Property Law
- International and Comparative Law
- Public Health Law
- Women, Leadership, and Equality

Students can focus in other areas as well, such as criminal law, dispute resolution, family law/child advocacy, general practice, jurisprudence/legal history, labor/employment law, administrative law, property/real estate/decedent's estates law, public interest law/community development, and tax law.

==== Clinical law program ====
Through the Cardin Requirement, named after Maryland Law alumnus U.S. Senator Benjamin Cardin, each full-time day student in the J.D. program must gain hands-on legal experience by representing actual clients who would otherwise lack access to justice. Most students fulfill the Cardin Requirement through the Clinical Law Program, which provides free legal services to Maryland's poorest citizens each year.

More than 25 clinics focus on a broad range of practice areas, including civil and criminal litigation, advice and counseling, and transactional work. Civil practice areas include environmental law, health, housing and community development, juvenile law and children, AIDS, and immigration. Criminal student attorneys often represent defendants in misdemeanor cases in Maryland's district courts, as well as work in the School of Law's community justice efforts. In addition to in-house clinical work, students may gain experience in public and private nonprofit externships in the Baltimore-Washington region.

==== Initiatives ====
In addition to formal specialty programs, the law school sponsors a variety of academic and public service initiatives. These initiatives enhance the educational and scholarly mission of the law school and also serve the community.

- Agriculture Law Education Initiative
- Chacón Center for Immigrant Justice
- Leadership, Ethics and Democracy (LEAD) Initiative: In spring 2008, the Fetzer Institute made a three-year $1.6 million funding commitment to the School of Law to help it respond to these challenges and create a Leadership, Ethics and Democracy program (LEAD).
- Legislation, politics, and public policy: The University of Maryland School of Law offers students an educational experience in the areas of legislation, public policy and public interest practice.
- Linking law and the arts: The University of Maryland School of Law, in conjunction with local arts organizations and as part of the "Linking Law and Arts" series, uses theater and art to help address complex legal, social, and public policy issues. As part of their commitment to blending law and the arts, students and professors at Maryland Law produced a short film in 2010 about the handling of war tribunals at Guantanamo Bay titled "The Response" starring Aasif Mandvi. UMD Carey Law is also one of fewer than 10 law schools in the United States to offer a course in Visual Legal Advocacy, teaching students how to and encouraging them to incorporate cinema into their advocacy work.
- The Moser Ethics in Action Initiative The successor to the LEAD Initiative.
- Erin Levitas Initiative for Sexual Assault Prevention

=== Dual-degree programs ===
The law school offers several dual-degree options:

==== Business ====
Maryland Law has a combined J.D./M.B.A. through:

- Robert H. Smith School of Business at the University of Maryland College Park
- Merrick School of Business at the University of Baltimore
- Carey Business School at Johns Hopkins University

==== Public policy ====
There are several dual-degree options in the field of public policy:

- J.D./M.P.P. from the University of Maryland School of Public Policy
- J.D./Ph.D through the University of Maryland Baltimore County School of Public Policy
- J.D./M.C.P. (Master of Community Planning) through the University of Maryland Urban Studies and Planning Program

==== Health ====
- J.D./Master of Public Health from the University of Maryland School of Medicine
- J.D./Master of Science in Toxicology Risk Assessment and Environmental Law from the University of Maryland School of Medicine
- J.D./Master of Science in Nursing from the University of Maryland School of Nursing (J.D./M.S.)
- JD/Doctor of Pharmacy from the University of Maryland School of Pharmacy

==== Law and society ====
- J.D./Master of Arts in Criminal Justice through the University of Maryland College Park
- J.D./Master of Arts in Liberal Arts through St. John's College, Annapolis
- J.D./Master of Social Work through the University of Maryland School of Social Work (J.D./M.S.W.)

== Campus ==
Maryland Law, including the Thurgood Marshall Law Library, occupies a complex that supports the school's programs integrating classroom and experiential learning. The facility opened in 2002 and contains three courtrooms, including the Ceremonial Moot Courtroom, where state and federal trial and appellate courts regularly sit in session to hear cases.

The Thurgood Marshall Law Library houses a collection of more than 495,000 volumes and equivalents accessible through the online catalog. A staff of 23, including 11 librarians, provides customized reference and consulting services to faculty and students. In addition to LexisNexis, Westlaw and Bloomberg Law, the library offers a legal and non-legal Web-based electronic databases.

The library is named after Justice Thurgood Marshall. Despite growing up in Baltimore, he was unable to attend Maryland Law because, in the 1930s, the school denied all African Americans admission. Marshall attended Howard University School of Law.

== Publications ==
- Maryland Law Review
- Journal of Health Care Law & Policy
- Journal of Business & Technology Law
- Journal of Race, Religion, Gender and Class
- Journal of International Law
