= E. Clay Timanus =

33rd Mayor of Baltimore from 1904 to 1907

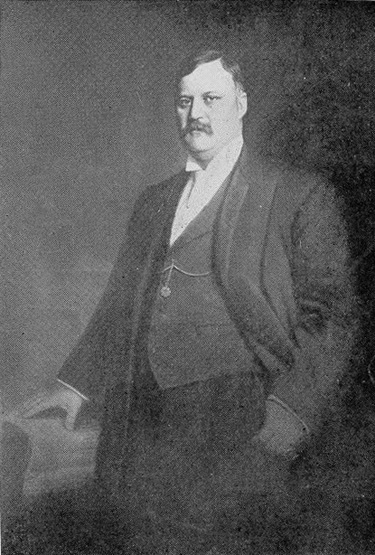

35th Mayor of Baltimore
- In office May 31st, 1904 – May 21st, 1907
- Preceded by: Robert McLane
- Succeeded by: J. Barry Mahool

Personal details
- Born: 1863
- Died: November 16, 1923 (aged 60)
- Party: Republican

Edwin Clay Timanus (1863–1923) was an American politician who served as mayor of Baltimore from 1904 to 1907. He assumed the office after the suicide of his predecessor Robert McLane. He was succeeded by Democrat J. Barry Mahool. Born in Baltimore to John T. and Fannie (Carroll) Timanus, his brother Gutavus served as mayor of Laurel, Maryland. His family owned a watermill. He was also a member of the Maryland racing commission and active in Republican politics. He died in his home town on November 16, 1923.
