= National Negro Committee =

African-American civil rights group (1909–10); predecessor to the NAACP

The National Negro Committee (formed: New York City, May 31 and June 1, 1909 – ceased: New York City, May 12, 1910) was created in response to the Springfield race riot of 1908 against the black community in Springfield, Illinois. Prominent black activists and white progressives called for a national conference to discuss African-American civil rights. They met to address the social, economic, and political rights of African Americans. This gathering served as the predecessor to the National Association for the Advancement of Colored People (NAACP), which was formally named during the second meeting in May 1910.

== Origins ==
=== Background: The Springfield Riot and call to action ===
In early September 1908, American socialist William English Walling published an article titled "The Race War in the North" in New York weekly, The Independent. He described the massive white race riot directed at Black residents in Springfield, Illinois, hometown of the late President Abraham Lincoln. The riot had resulted in seven deaths, the destruction of 40 homes and 24 businesses, and 107 indictments against mostly African Americans who had tried to defend their homes. Walling concluded by saying that a powerful body of citizens needed to come to the aid of blacks in the United States. Mary Ovington wrote to Walling about her interest in this subject and met with him at his apartment in New York City, along with social worker Dr. Henry Moskowitz.

=== Planning the Conference ===
The three decided to organize a national conference on the civil and political rights of African Americans, to be held in New York on the centennial of Lincoln's birthday, February 12, 1909. They issued a call to progressives, and many people responded.

=== Forming the National Negro Committee ===
They formed the National Negro Committee, which held its first meeting in New York on May 31 and June 1, 1909, at the Henry Street Settlement House on the Lower East Side. The group leaders initially tried to get the famous Booker T. Washington to attend meetings to gain popularity. Although Oswald G. Villard, the grandson of William Lloyd Garrison and one of the founders, was fed up with Washington ignoring "the real injustices" that affected African Americans, Villard knew that inviting him would help the organization gain momentum. Villard told Washington that the organization would avoid allying with either the more radical activists and scholars such as W. E. B. Du Bois or the conservatism of Black Tuskegee activists, but attempt to benefit all African Americans. He nonetheless clarified that the organization would be a "radical political movement". Washington refused to attend, out of fear of ensuing Southern controversy, a concern of ruining the tone of the meeting, and a desire to avoid agitation. The Committee was not overly bothered by his absence, as Villard was more interested in attracting those like Du Bois to shake up Washington's widespread conservatism.

=== Debate, tensions, and resolutions ===
The meetings sparked tensions with Washington and his supporters. Many of the Committee's members had been part of the Niagara Movement, which had had notoriously poor relations with Washington. The meetings also lacked many of Washington's allies, such as Andrew Carnegie, who pointedly did not attend. The Committee generated a fair amount of controversy, with some fearing that it would dramatically worsen race relations, and others expressing concern over its "political emphasis". Many claimed that the Conference was "anti-Washingtonian". Nevertheless, the organizers continued on. The attendance of both Black and white activists was a positive indicator of a "successful cooperation of the races". The meetings covered topics including social and economic issues, voting rights, physiological differences between races, lynching, and education. The June 1 meeting brought about disputes between white members and Black members, who expressed a lack of trust in their white counterparts. This tension was partly due to the resurgence of the issue of courting Washington's support, this time in the context of including him in a steering committee to appeal to potential white donors. The committee was eventually formed without Washington. It also overlooked more radical members such as Ida B. Wells (although she was later included in the committee), who were not chosen in favor of more moderate members, which caused more argument. During the debates of the evening, white leaders were generally patronizing towards Black members, as Ovington herself acknowledged:

I find myself still occasionally forgetting that the Negroes aren't poor people for whom I must kindly do something, and then comes a gathering such as that last evening and I learn they are men with most forceful opinions of their own.

— Mary White Ovington (June 1, 1909)

Willard even went so far as to suggest the formation of a separate group with less "trying" members. Du Bois was the eventual savior of the evening, as he managed to win over the whites. He later recounted the evening as "warm and passionate", and described a woman who stood up and "cried in passionate, almost tearful earnestness – an earnestness born of bitter experience – 'They are betraying us again – these white friends of ours.'" Following more discussion, the committee eventually came to a resolution:

We agree fully with the prevailing opinion that the transformation of the unskilled colored laborers in industry and agriculture into skilled workers is of vital importance to that race and to the nation, but we demand for the Negroes as for all others a free and complete education, whether by city, state, or nation, a grammar school and industrial training for all, and technical, professional and academic education for the most gifted.

— Committee resolution (June 1, 1909)

=== Aftermath and legacy ===
Washington was, unsurprisingly, unhappy with the committee's more radical stance. The resolution also drew scathing criticism from large publications, who expressed fears of a "socialist revolution" sparked by "More Fool Negroes".

By May 1910, the National Negro Committee and attendees at its second conference organized a permanent body known as the National Association for the Advancement of Colored People (NAACP).

== National Negro Committee Membership on June 1, 1909 ==
The "Resolution" on June 1, 1909, establishing the "Committee of Forty" for the National Negro Conference described the committee as having forty members; however, the published list in the conference proceedings contains only thirty-eight names. Rabbi Joseph Silverman, who appears in some modern summaries, is not included in this historic list.

1. New York City
2. William English Walling (1877–1936), Chairman
3. Rev. Walter Henderson Brooks (1882–1945) ★ ♦
4. Prof. John Dewey, PhD (1859–1952) ★
5. Paul Kennaday (1873–1929) ★ ♦
6. Jacob Wolfgang Mack (1845–1912), a shirt manufacturer ★
7. Mrs. Mary Dunlop Maclean (1873–1912) ★ ♦
8. John Elmer Milholland (1860–1925)
9. Henry Moskowitz, PhD (1880–1936)
10. Miss Leonora O'Reilly (1870–1927) ★
11. Charles Edward Russell (1860–1941) ★ ♦
12. Prof. Edwin Robert Anderson Seligman (1861–1939) ★
13. Rabbi Joseph Silverman, D.D. (1860–1930) ★ ♦
14. Oswald Garrison Villard (1872–1949)
15. Miss Lillian D. Wald (1867–1940) ★
16. Bishop Alexander Walters (1858–1917) ★
17. Stephen Samuel Wise, PhD (1874–1949) ★
18. Brooklyn
19. Miss Mary White Ovington (1865–1951) ★ ♦
20. Rev. Owen Meredith Waller, D.D. (1868–1939) ★ ♦
21. Yonkers
22. Rev. John Haynes Holmes (1879–1964) ★ ♦
23. New Jersey
24. Prof. William Lewis Bulkley, Ridgefield Park ★ ♦
25. Boston
26. Miss Maria Louise Baldwin (1856–1922) ★
27. Archibald Henry Grimké (1849–1930) ★
28. Albert Enoch Pillsbury (1849–1930) ★ ♦
29. Moorfield Storey (1845–1929)
30. Ohio
31. Pres. Charles Franklin Thwing (1853–1937), Cleveland ★
32. Pres. William Sanders Scarborough (1852–1926), Wilberforce ★
33. Chicago
34. Miss Laura Jane Addams (1860–1935) ★ ♦
35. Mrs. Ida Wells Barnett (1862–1931) ★ ♦
36. Charles Edwin Bentley, DDS (1859–1929) ★ ♦
37. Mrs. Celia Parker Woolley (1848–1918) ★ ♦
38. Philadelphia
39. William Albert Sinclair, M.D. (1857–1926) ★ ♦
40. Miss Susan Parrish Wharton (1852–1928) ★
41. Richard Robert Wright, Jr. (1878–1967) ★
42. Washington, D.C.
43. Lafayette Mckeen Hershaw (1863–1945) ★
44. Judge Wendell Philips Stafford (1861–1953) ★
45. Mrs. Mary Church Terrell (1863–1954) ★ ♦
46. Rev. John Milton Waldron (1863–1931) ★ ♦
47. Atlanta
48. Prof. W. E. B. DuBois (1868–1963)
49. Virginia
50. Leslie Pinckney Hill (1880–1960), Manassas ★

Thirty-three of the above names marked with ★ also served on the Committee of the NAACP in 1910. Those NAACP Committee members marked with ♦ were members of the Executive Committee in 2010.

National Negro Committee members
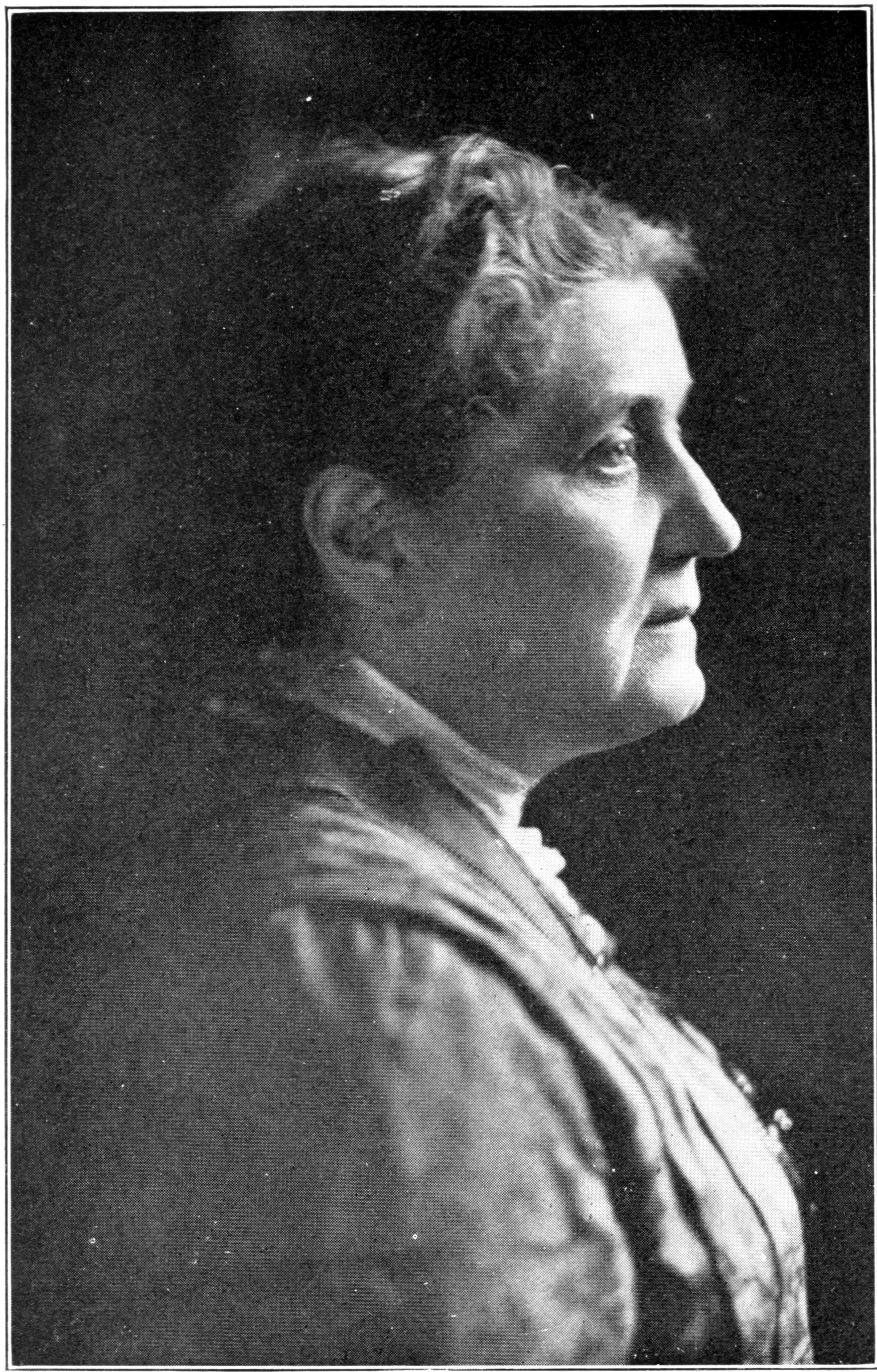
Laura Jane Addams
(1914)

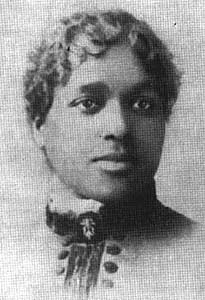
Maria Louise Baldwin
(date unknown)

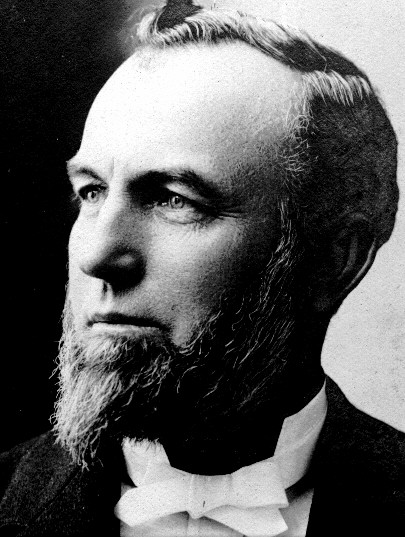
Charles Edwin Bentley
(date unknown)

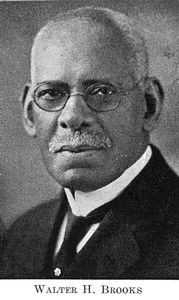
Walter Henderson Brooks
(c. 1921)

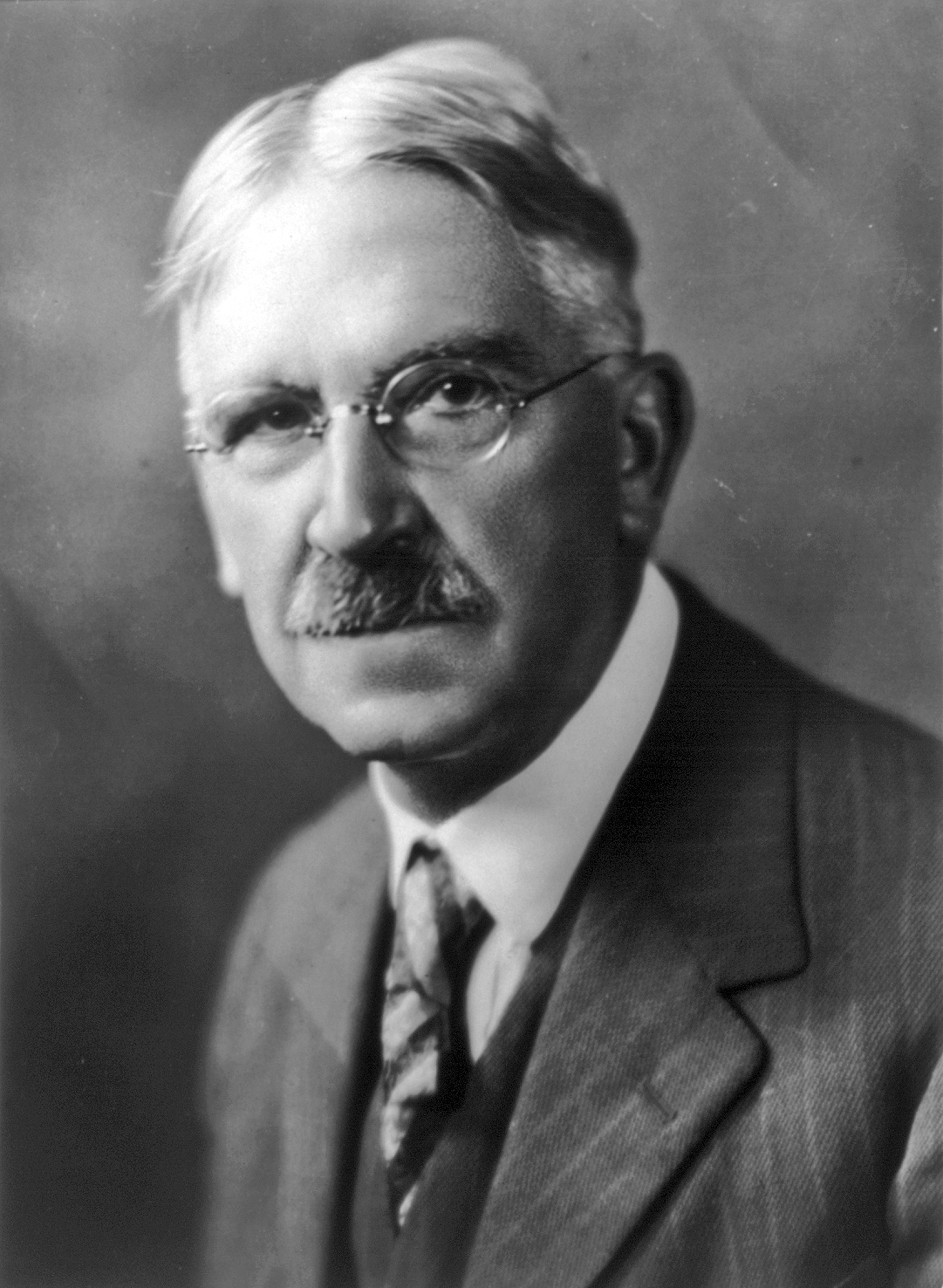
John Dewey
(date unknown)

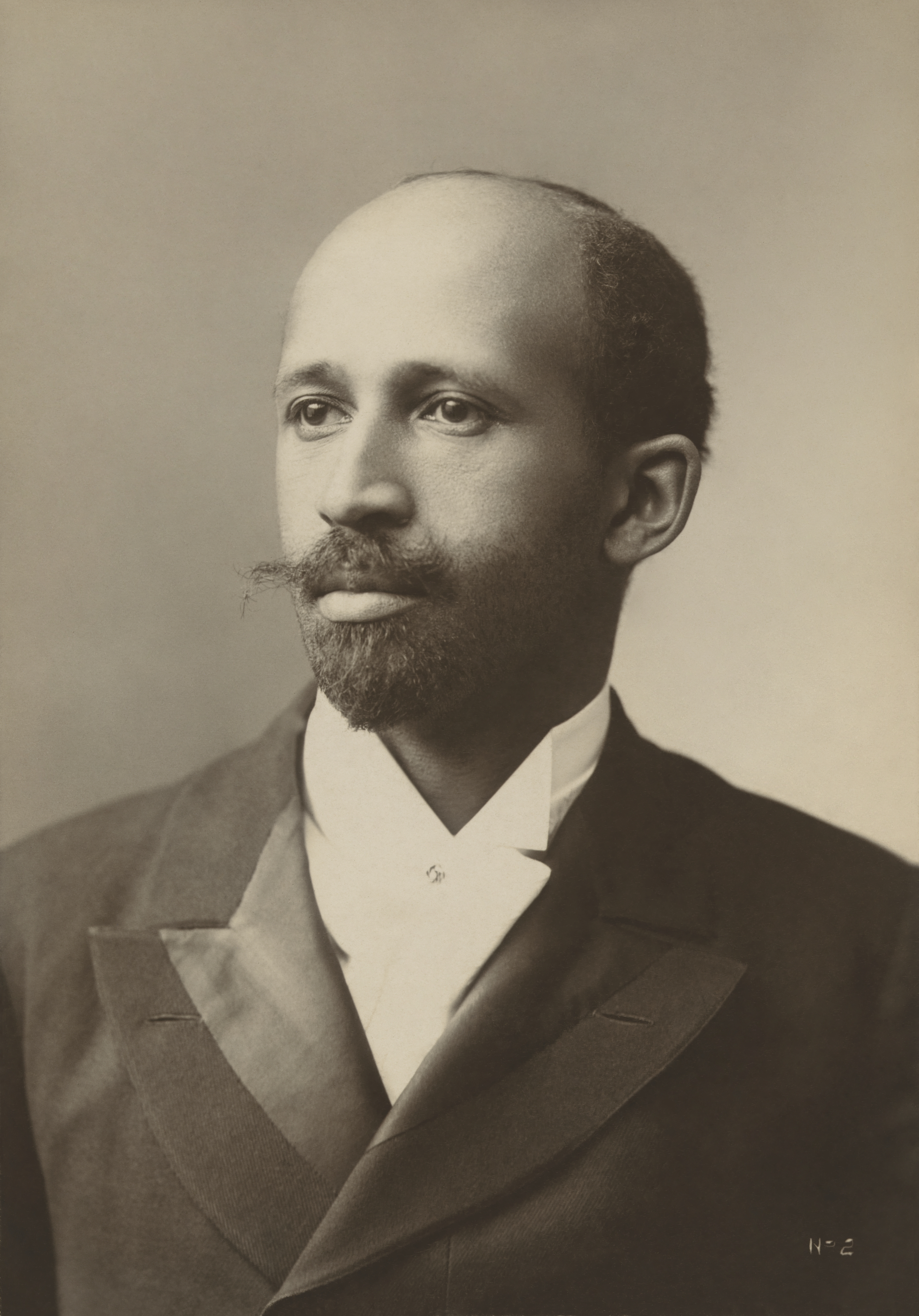
W.E.B. Du Bois
(1907)

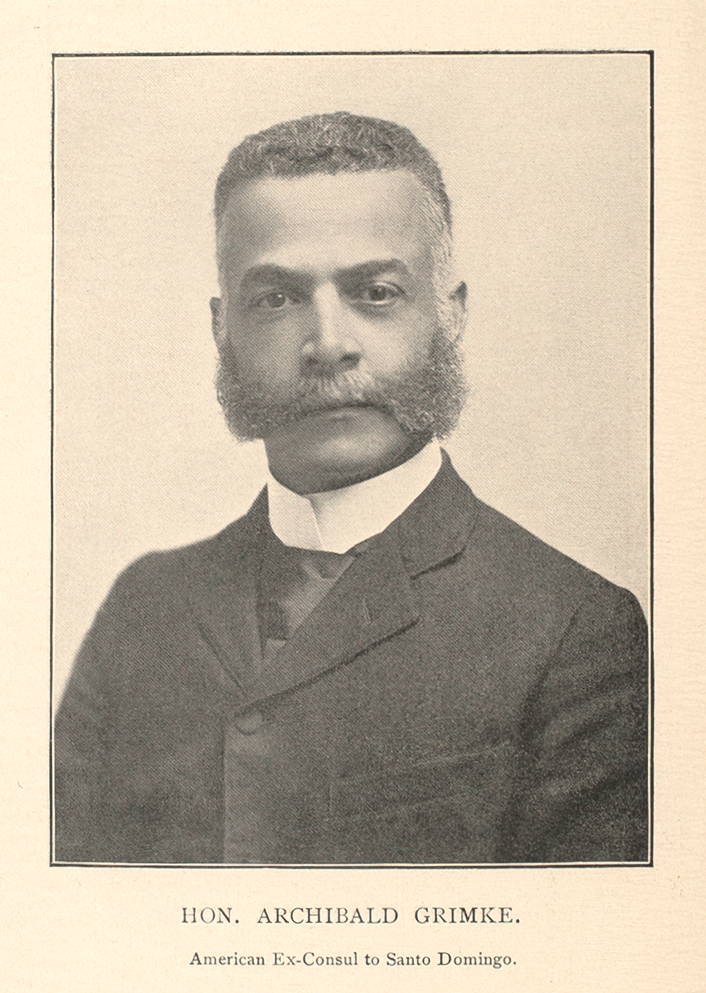
Archibald Henry Grimké
(c 1900–1909)

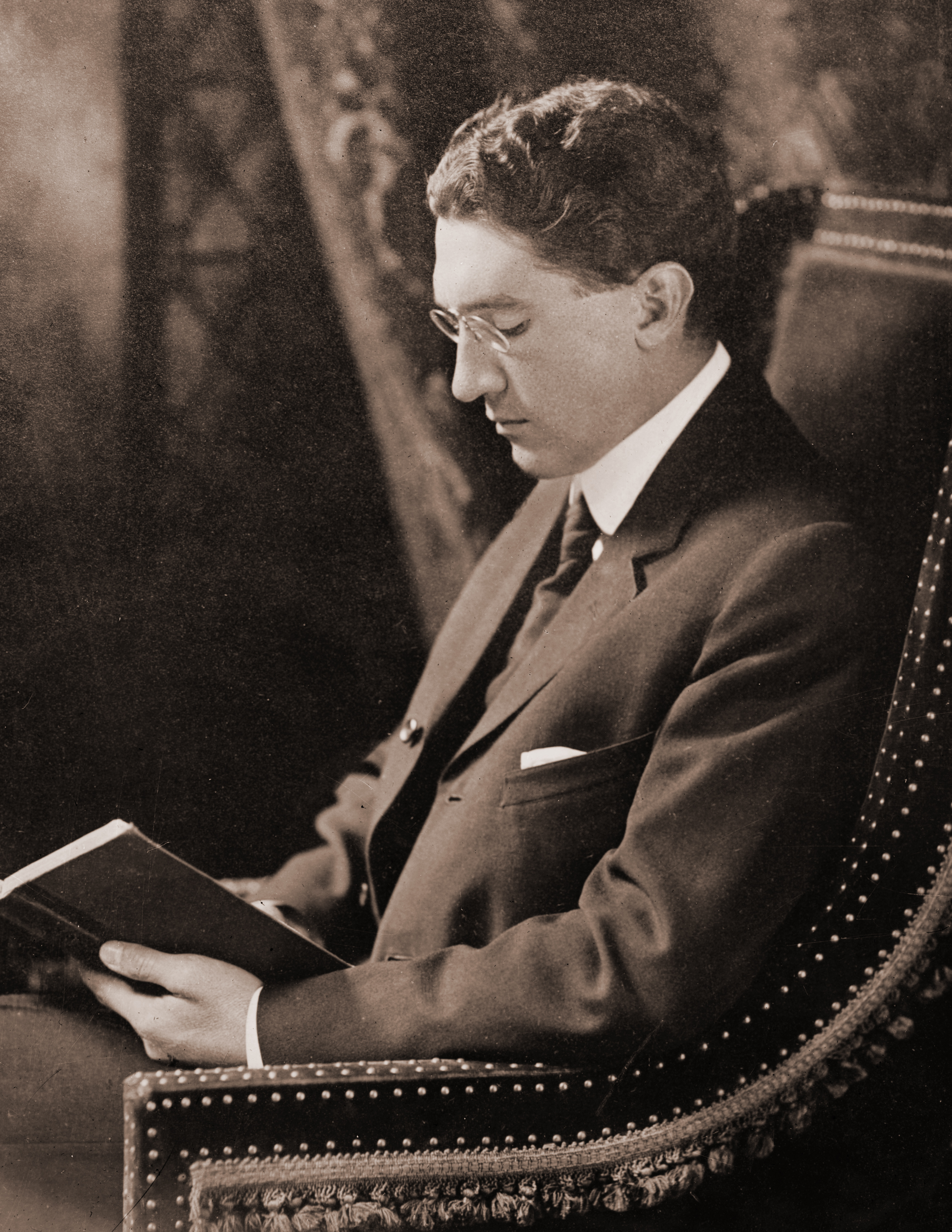
John Haynes Holmes
(1908)

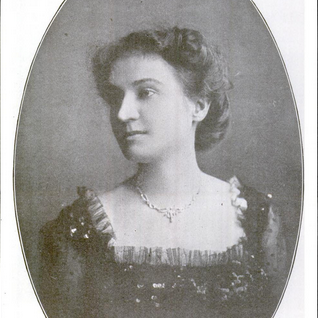
Mary Dunlop Maclean
(1912)

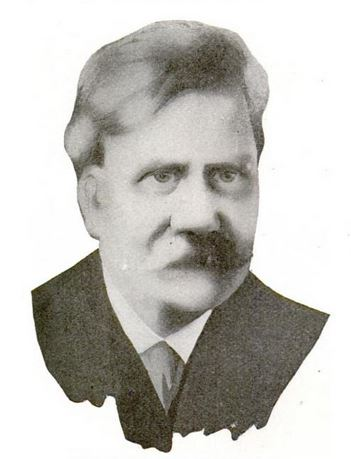
John Elmer Milholland
(c. 1911)

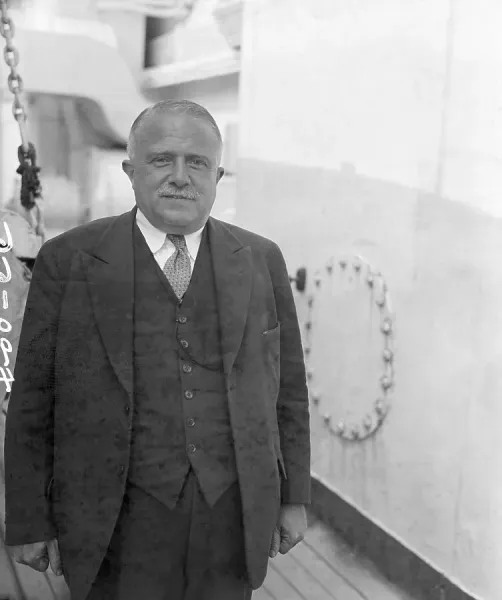
Henry Moskowitz
(1933)

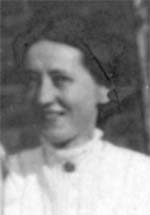
Leonora O'Reilly
(c. 1900)

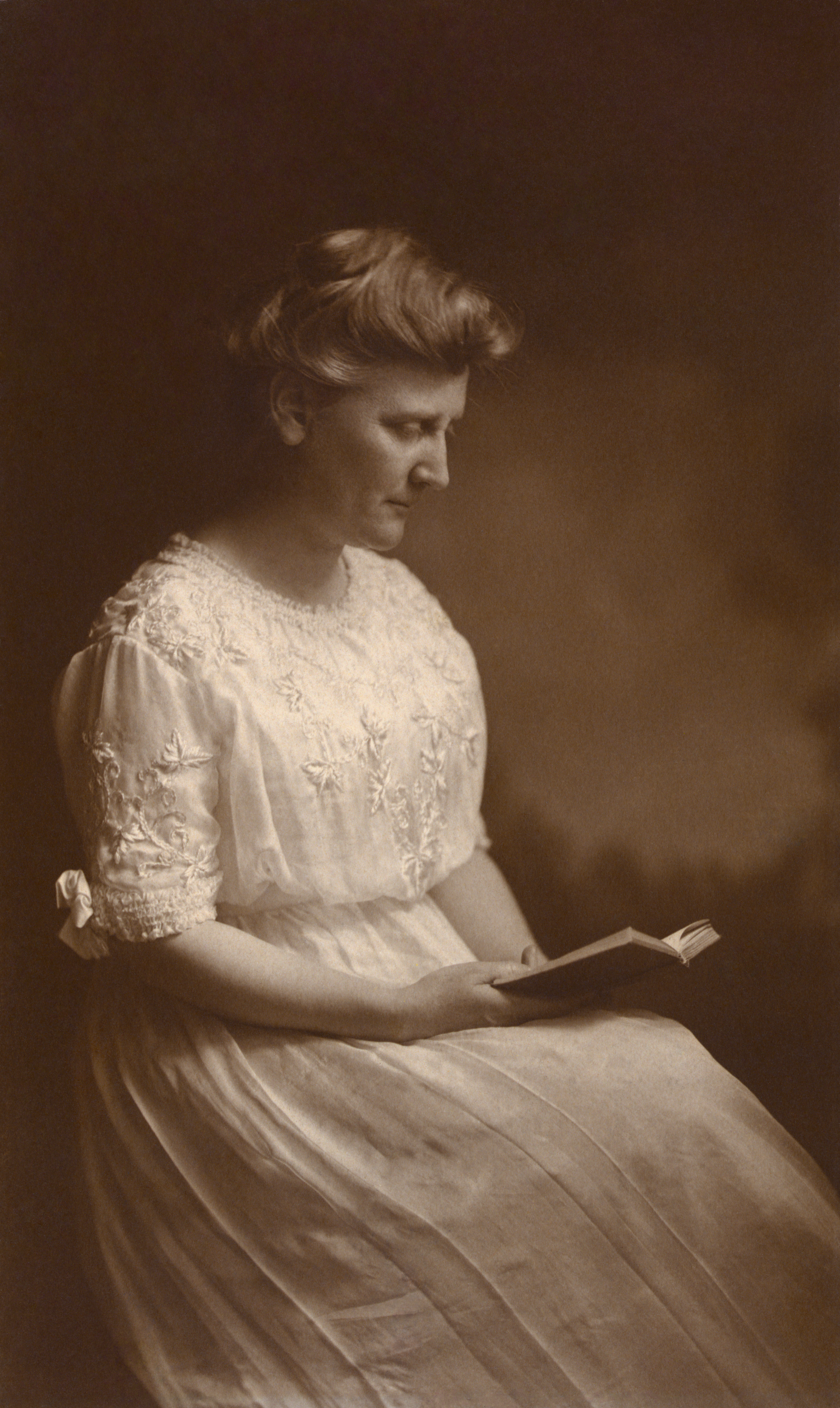
Mary White Ovington
(c. 1890–1900)

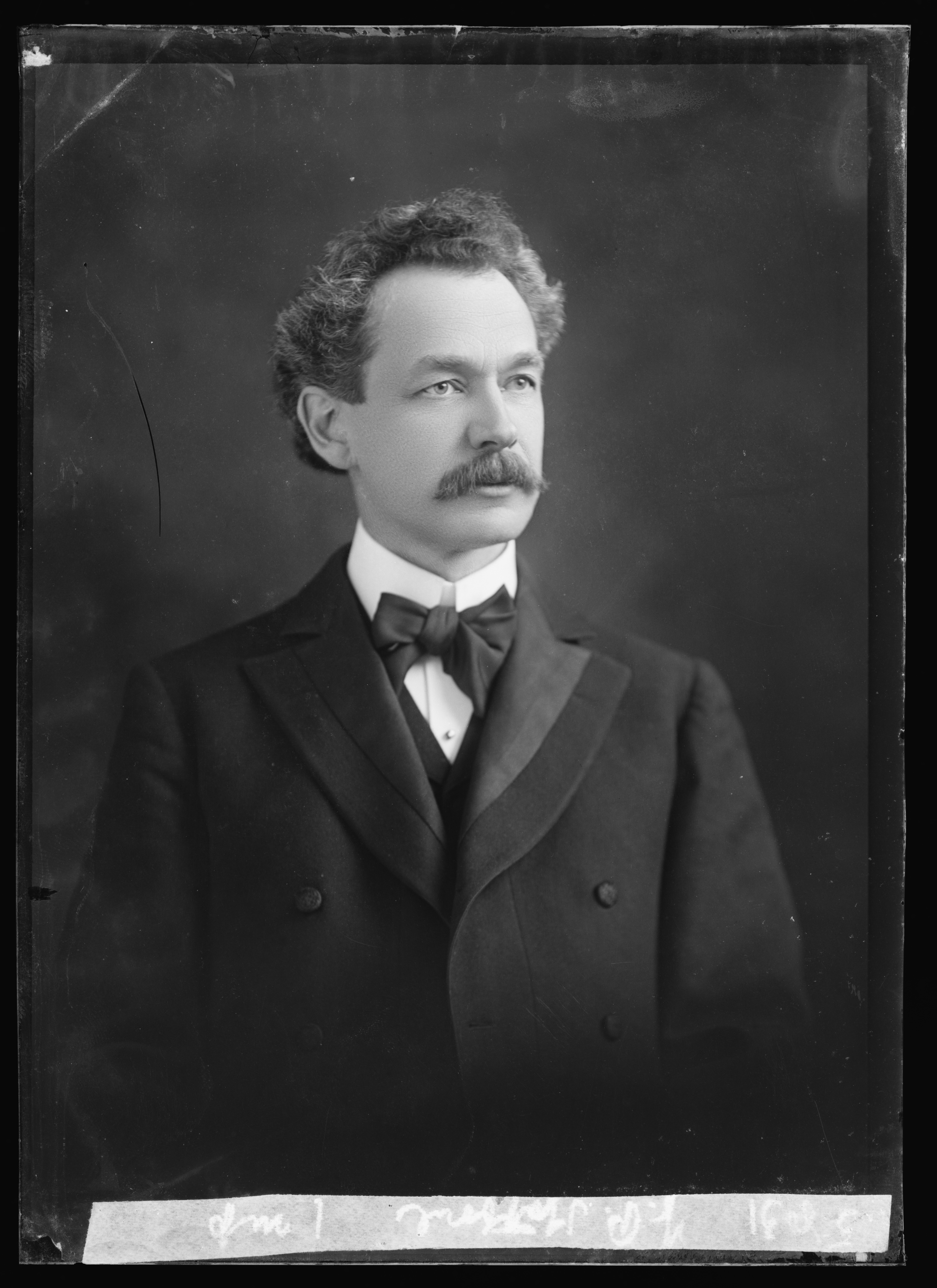
Wendell Phillips Stafford
(1909)

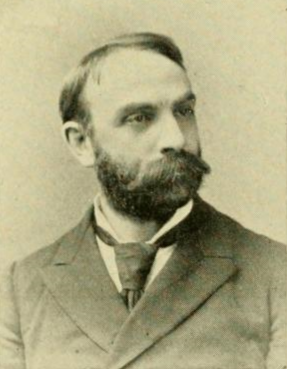
Albert Enoch Pillsbury
(1893)

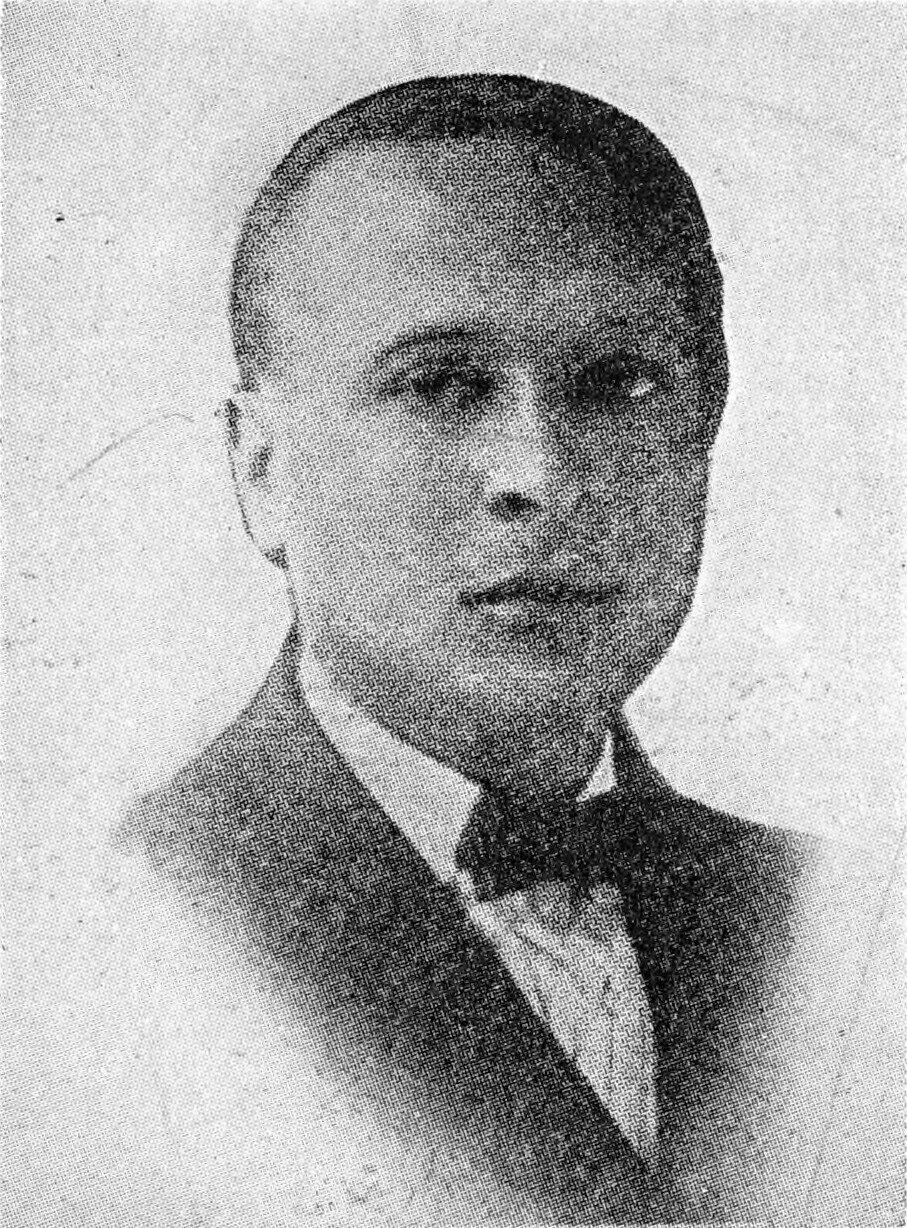
Leslie Pinckney Hill
(1923)

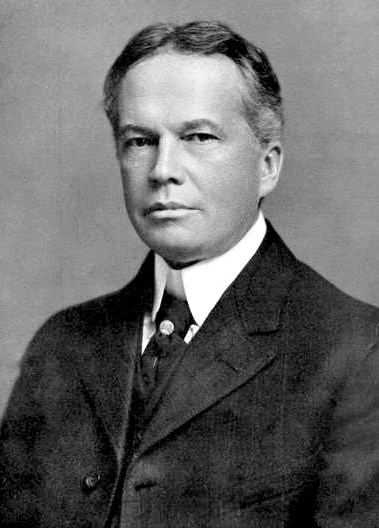
Charles Edward Russell
(c. 1907)

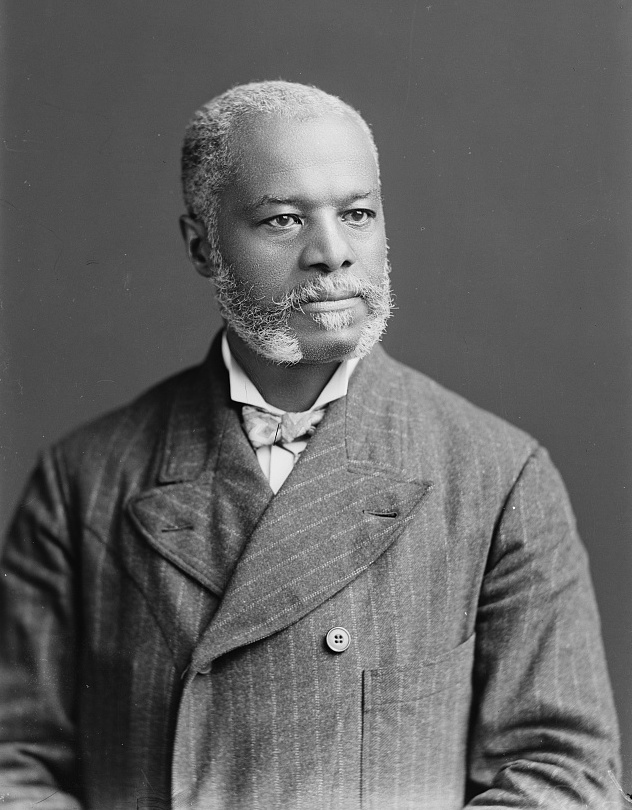
William Sanders Scarborough
(1903)

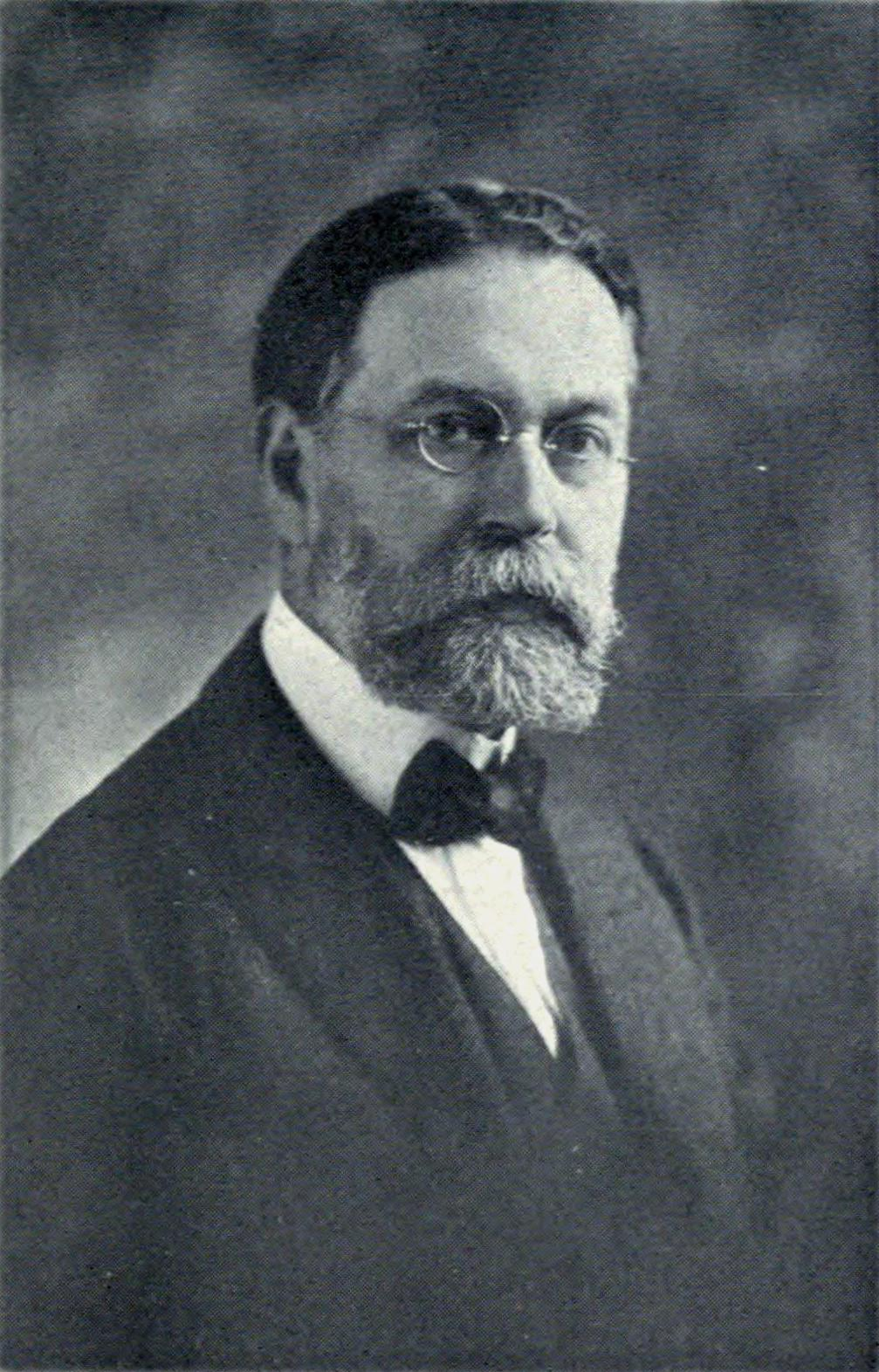
Edwin Robert Anderson Seligman
(c. 1922)

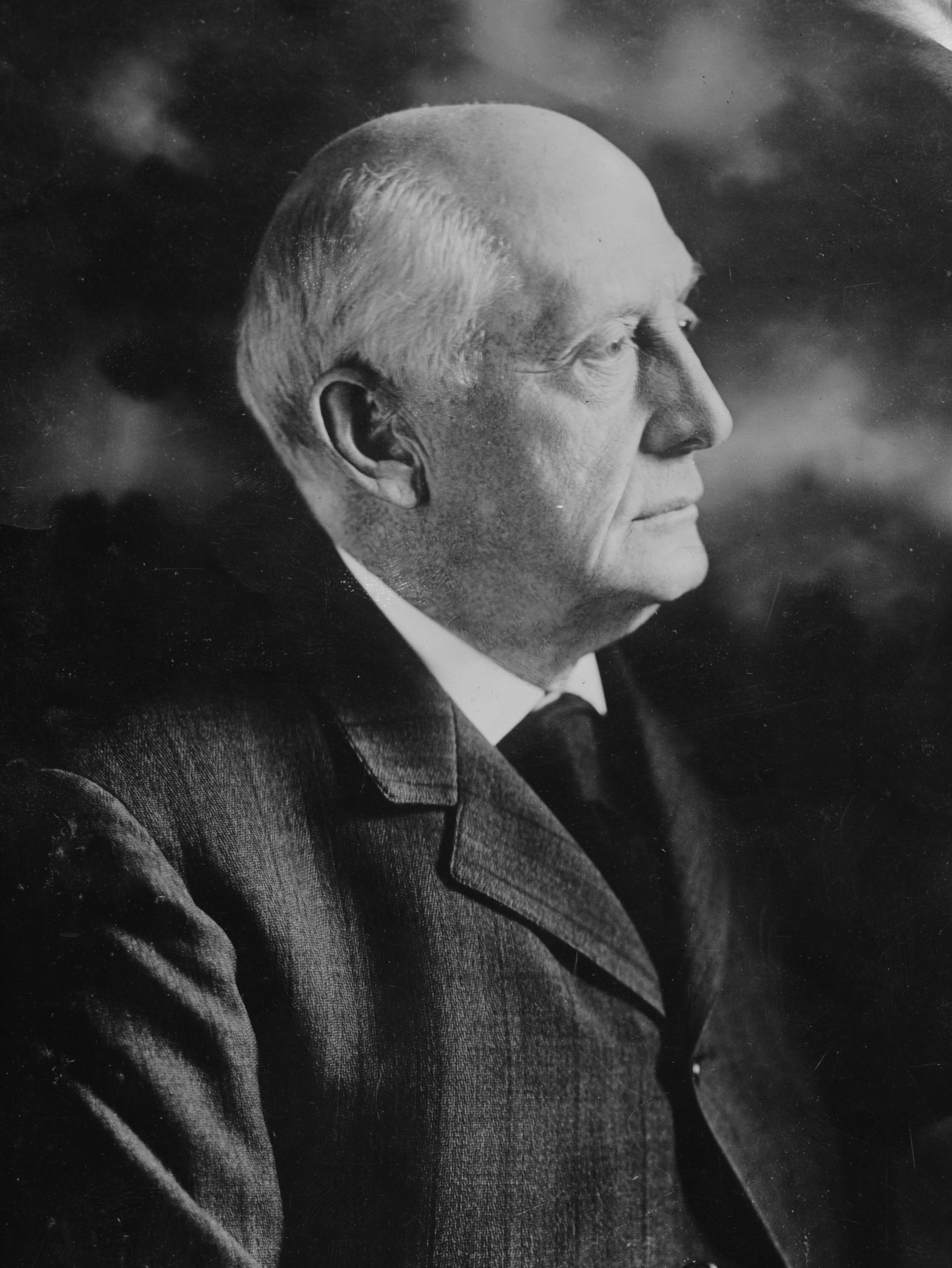
Moorfield Storey
(c 1910–1915)

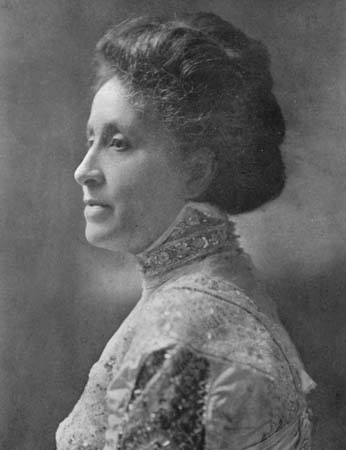
Mary Church Terrell
(c. 1919)

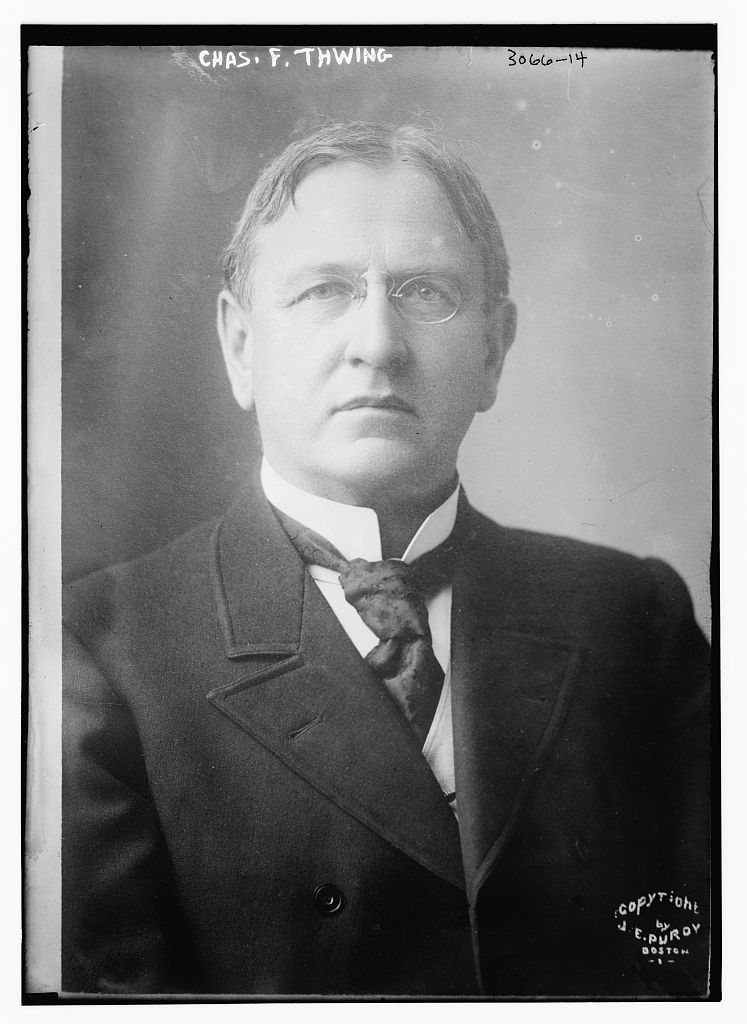
Charles Franklin Thwing
(c 1915)

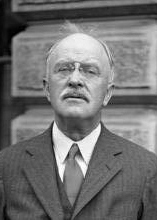
Oswald Garrison Villard
(1930)

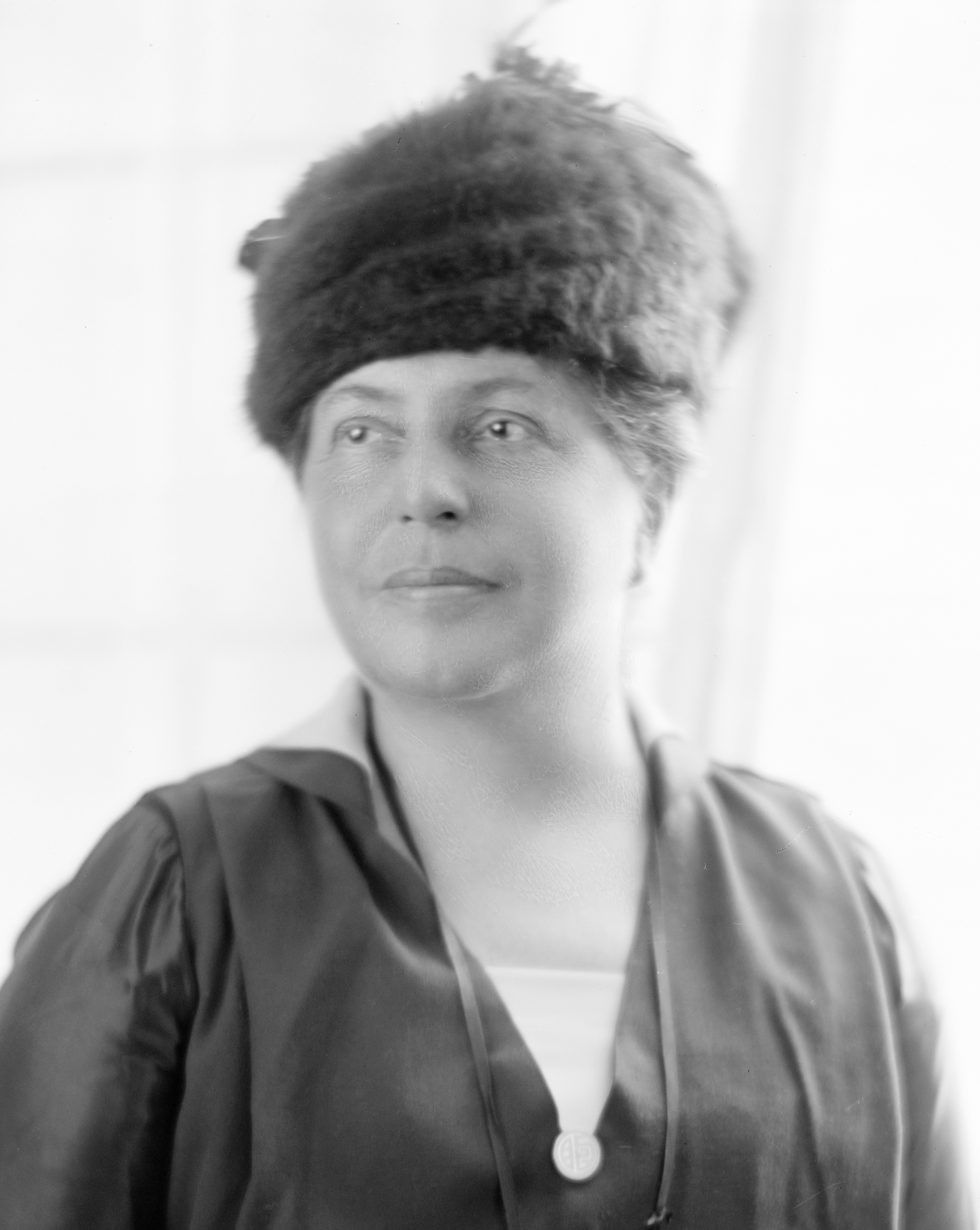
Lillian D. Wald
(c. 1905–1940)

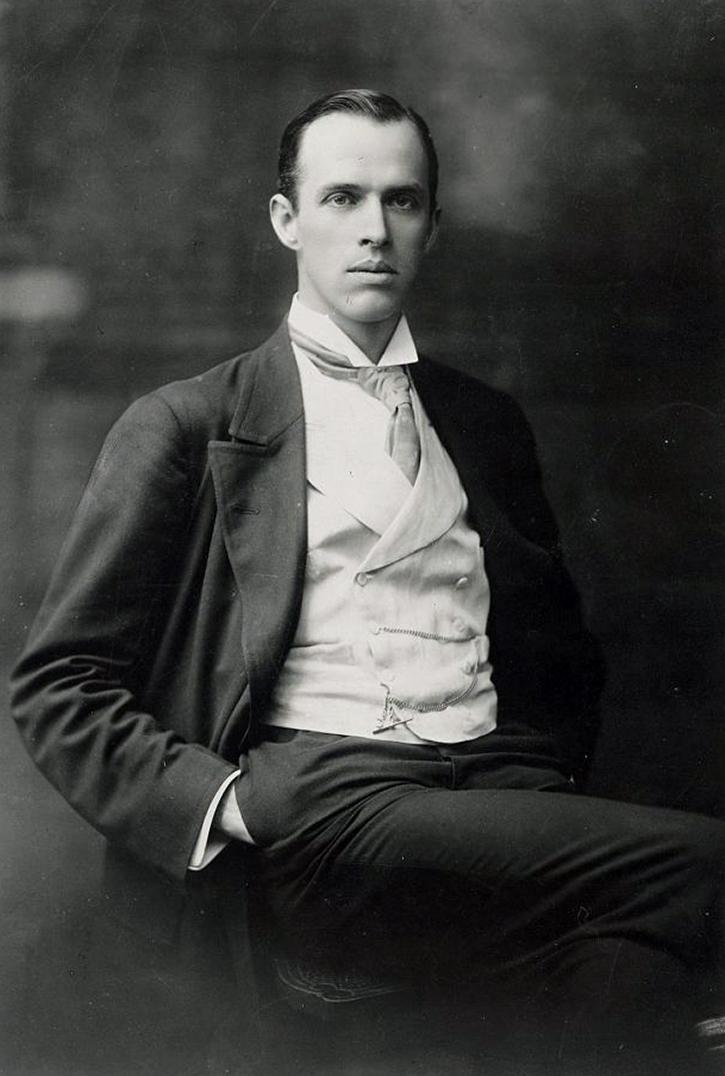
William English Walling
(1906)

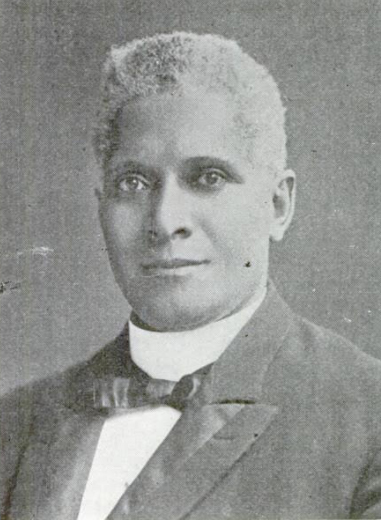
Alexander Walters
(1917)

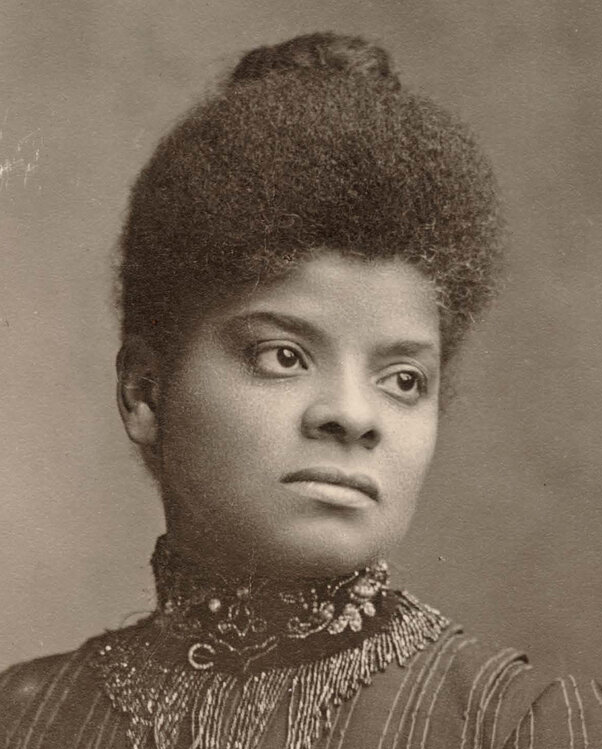
Ida B. Wells
(1895)

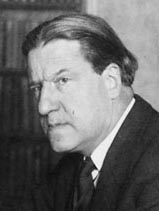
Stephen Samuel Wise
(c. 1920–1940)

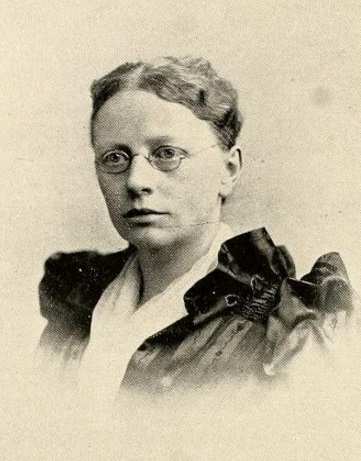
Celia Parker Woolley
(1897)

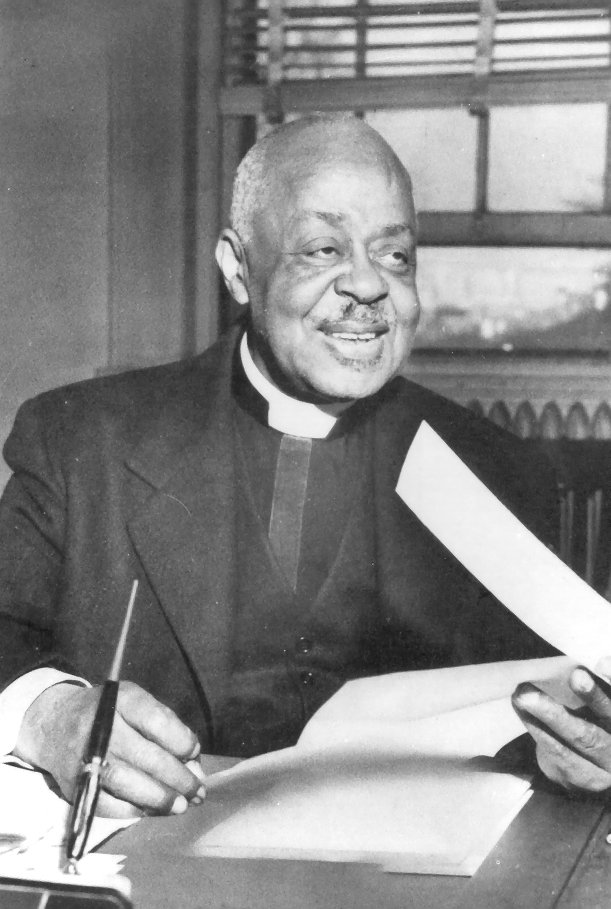
Richard Robert Wright, Jr.
(c. 1940)
Not shown: Paul Kennaday; Jacob Wolfgang Mack; Rabbi Joseph Silverman, D.D.; Rev. Owen Meredith Waller, D.D.; Prof. William Lewis Bulkley; William Albert Sinclair, M.D.; and Lafayette Mckeen Hershaw.

== Bibliography ==
=== References ===
- Bracks, Lean'tin L. [at Wikidata]; Smith, Jessie Carney, eds. (2014). Black Women of the Harlem Renaissance Era. Rowman & Littlefield. LCCN 2014-16465; ISBN 0-8108-8542-5, 978-0-8108-8542-4 (cloth), ISBN 0-8108-8543-3, 978-0-8108-8543-1 (ebook); OCLC 894554745 (all editions).
1. Johnson, Aisha M. "Ovington, Mary White". pp. 169–170. ISBN 978-0-8108-8543-1 – via Internet Archive (Northeastern Technical College); digitized by the Kahle/Austin Foundation.
- Proceedings of the National Negro Conference, 1909 (Morning Session, June 1, 1909). Preface by William English Walling (1877–1936). New York. May 31 – June 1, 1909. LCCN 69-18544 (1969 reprint from a copy at the Harvard Library); OCLC 16530911 (all editions).
1. "Resolutions" (New York Public Library). [New York?. p. 225.
2. "Resolutions" (Cal Berkeley). p. 225.
- Rudwick, Elliott M. (October 1957). "The National Negro Committee Conference of 1909". The Phylon Quarterly. 18 (4): 413–419. doi:10.2307/273282. JSTOR 273282. ISSN 0885-6826 (journal); JSTOR 273282 (article); doi:10.2307/273282 (article); OCLC 5548669828 (article).
- Walling, William English (September 3, 1908). "The Race War in the North". The Independent (weekly founded in 1848). (news editorial on the Springfield Riot). Vol. 65, no. 3118. New York. pp. 529–534 – via ProQuest. LCCN sf85-1146, LCCN sf89-91717, LCCN sf85-1147; OCLC 2690-1862; OCLC 4927591 (all editions).
1. Pdf via Eastern Illinois University (PDF).
2. Via HathiTrust (Cornell).
3. Via Google Books (Stanford).
- White, Deborah Gray (born (1949); Bay, Mia; Martin, Waldo E., Jr (born 1951) (2012). Freedom on My Mind: A History of African Americans, With Documents (2 Vols.). Boston: Bedford/St. Martin's.

1st ed. (2012)
LCCN 2012-939011
ISBN 978-0-3121-9729-2 (Combined ed.)
ISBN 978-0-3126-4883-1 (Vol. 1)
ISBN 0-3126-4884-7, 978-0-3126-4884-8 (Vol. 2)
2nd ed. (2017)
LCCN 2017-302640
ISBN 978-1-319-02133-7 (Combined ed.)
ISBN 978-1-319-06052-7 (Vol. 1)
ISBN 978-1-319-06053-4 (Vol. 2)
3rd ed. (2020)
LCCN 2020-939788
ISBN 978-1-3192-6574-8 (mobi)

1. Vol. 2. Since 1865 (Chapters 8–15). Chapter 9: "Black Life and Culture, 1880–1915:" "National Negro Committee; Platform, 1909" (1st ed.). 2013. p. 463 – via Internet Archive (limited preview).
2. Vol. 2. Since 1865 (Chapters 8–15). Chapter 9: "Black Life and Culture During the Nadir, 1880–1915" (2nd ed.). 2017 – via Google Books (limited preview).
3. Vol. 2. Since 1865 (Chapters 9–17). Chapter 10: "Black Life and Culture During the Nadir, 1877–1915" (3rd ed.). 2020 – via Google Books (limited preview).
