= Tony Badger =

British academic and historian

Master of Clare College, Cambridge
- In office 2003–2014
- Preceded by: Bob Hepple
- Succeeded by: Anthony Grabiner

Personal details
- Born: Anthony John Badger; 6 March 1947 (age 79)

Academic background
- Education: Cotham Grammar School
- Alma mater: Sidney Sussex College, Cambridge; University of Hull

Academic work
- Discipline: History
- Sub-discipline: History of the United States; New Deal; Great Depression in the United States
- Institutions: Newcastle University; University of Cambridge; Northumbria University

Anthony John "Tony" Badger (born 6 March 1947) is a British academic and historian. Until 2014 he was Paul Mellon Professor of American History at the University of Cambridge and Master of Clare College, Cambridge. He is a specialist in post-World War II Southern American political history.

== Early life ==
Badger was born on 6 March 1947, and attended Cotham Grammar School in Bristol. He studied history at Sidney Sussex College, Cambridge, and received his B.A. degree with Honours in 1968 and his M.A. from the University of Cambridge in 1971. He graduated with a Ph.D. in American studies from the University of Hull in 1974. In 1999, Hull awarded him an honorary D. Litt.

== Academic career ==
Badger was a lecturer in the History Department of Newcastle University from 1971 to 1991. He held the Andrew Mellon Visiting Professorship at Tulane University, New Orleans from January to May 2000. In 1992, he moved to the University of Cambridge, having been appointed Paul Mellon Professor of American History. He retired from Cambridge at the end of the 2013/2014 academic year and took up a post as professor of American history at Northumbria University in Newcastle upon Tyne.

He served on the Cambridge University Council from 1988 to 2002 and 2005 to 2008. He chaired its audit committee between 2001 and 2002, and chaired the search committee in 2002 that secured the appointment of Alison Richard as vice-chancellor. Since 2004, he has been the chairman of Cambridge Assessment, the major examination and assessment body.

== Works ==
1. Prosperity Road: The New Deal, Tobacco, and North Carolina (Chapel Hill, 1980)
2. North Carolina and the New Deal (Raleigh, 1981)
3. The New Deal: The Depression Years 1933-1940 (London and New York, 1989)
4. New Deal/ New South (University of Arkansas Press, 2007)
5. FDR: The First Hundred Days (Hill and Wang, 2008)
6. Albert Gore, Sr.: A Political Life (University of Pennsylvania Press, 2018)
7. Why White Liberals Fail: Race and Southern Politics from FDR to Trump (Harvard University Press, 2022)
8. Prosperity Road: America, 1920–1945, from Hoover to Roosevelt (Harper, 2026)

== FDR: The First Hundred Days ==
Prime Minister Gordon Brown selected Professor Badger’s book FDR: The First Hundred Days, about the 32nd President of the United States, as his 2008 book of the year. In the Guardian, Brown wrote,

It's a classic example of how a work of history can illuminate the issues we're dealing with today. What it brings out with such clarity is how Roosevelt, faced with an economic crisis of unprecedented severity, was prepared to put aside conventional policy approaches and, instead, had the courage to innovate and improvise to see what would work. The imagination and humanity at the heart of some of the great New Deal innovations - such as the Tennessee Valley Authority or the Civilian Conservation Corps - changed American politics for ever, and shaped the future of progressive politics across the world. At the same time, this book illustrates FDR's skills as a communicator and a political operator, which earned him the public support and political space he needed for his programme to succeed. It's a brilliantly written, compelling and moving portrait of the man, and it's another outstanding example of how British historians add so much to the field of American history.

This work influenced Gordon Brown in shaping the economic response to the recession.

== Chairman – Kennedy Memorial Trust ==
On 24 March 2009, Gordon Brown appointed Badger as the chairman of the Kennedy Memorial Trust, effective from July 7, 2009. He replaced Emma Rothschild who had served since 2000. Upon accepting this chairmanship, he said, “"It is an honour to be asked to chair the Kennedy Memorial Trust. The Kennedy scholarships are a most fitting legacy to the late President and recognise the long-standing ties of the Kennedy family with Britain. They have enabled some of the very best students in Britain to experience world-class graduate education in the US." Badger was succeeded as the trust's chair in July 2016 by Professor Sir Mark Walport.

Academic offices
Preceded by Charlotte Erickson	Paul Mellon Professor of American History; 1992–2014	Succeeded by Gary Gerstle
Preceded by Bob Hepple	Master of Clare College, Cambridge; 2003–2014	Succeeded by Anthony Grabiner, Baron Grabiner
