= Paul Mellon Professor of American History =

Professorship at the University of Cambridge

The Paul Mellon Professorship of American History is a senior professorship at the University of Cambridge. It was established in 1980 with funds from Paul Mellon family fortune and has been held by several notable American, British, and Canadian academics and public intellectuals since its creation.

The position is sufficiently endowed so as to be a permanent academic post at the University of Cambridge. The Paul Mellon Professor of American History serves both as a scholar and as a cross-cultural leader, advancing and deepening US-British academic and diplomatic connections. From 2014 to 2024, the Paul Mellon Professor of American History was Gary Gerstle. In July 2024 the University announced the election of the next Mellon Professor, Mia Bay of the University of Pennsylvania, who assumed the role on 1 January 2025.

== List of Paul Mellon Professors of American History ==
- 1982–1990 Charlotte Erickson
- 1992–2014 Tony Badger
- 2014–2024 Gary Gerstle
- 2025– present Mia Bay
