= Ann Fabian =

American historian (born 1949)

- Born: August 18, 1949 (age 76) California, United States
- Occupation: Historian
- Education: University of California, Santa Cruz (BA); Yale University (PhD)

Ann Fabian (born August 18, 1949) is an American historian.

== Life ==
She grew up in Southern California.

== Career ==
Fabian completed her B.A. in philosophy at the University of California, Santa Cruz. She received her Ph.D. in American studies at Yale University. She is professor emeritus of history at Rutgers University.

== Distinctions ==
Fabian is a member of the Organization of American Historians, and American Antiquarian Society, as well as former president of the Society for Historians of the Early American Republic and Society of American Historians. She received a Guggenheim Fellowship in 2002.

== Works ==
- Card Sharps and Bucket Shops: Gambling in Nineteenth-Century America (1999) ISBN 978-0415923576
- The Unvarnished Truth: Personal Narratives in Nineteenth-Century America (2000) ISBN 978-0520232013
- The Skull Collectors: Race, Science, and America's Unburied Dead (2010) ISBN 978-0226233482
- Race and Retail: Consumption across the Color Line, co-edited with Mia Bay (2015) ISBN 978-0813571706
