= Deborah Gray White =

American historian

Deborah Gray White is emeritus Board of Governors Professor of History and of Women's and Gender Studies at Rutgers University. She also co-directed "The Black Atlantic: Race, Nation and Gender", a project at the Rutgers Center for Historical Analysis from 1997 to 1999. Throughout 2000-2003 she was the chair of the history department at Rutgers. She headed the Scarlet and Black Project, which investigates African Americans in the history of Rutgers. White was awarded a Woodrow Wilson International Center Fellowship in 2005, a Guggenheim Fellowship in 2009, the Carter G. Woodson Scholars Medallion in 2013, and an honorary doctorate from Binghamton University in 2014.

== Education ==
White received her B.A degree from Binghamton University, her M.A. degree from Columbia University, and her Ph.D. from University of Illinois at Chicago. In 1984 she accepted a position in the history department of Rutgers.

== Career ==
Her seminal monograph, Ar'n't I A Woman?: Female Slaves in the Plantation South, was published in 1985. This book was among the first monographs on the history of African-American women, and was responsible for the creation of the Library of Congress subject category “Woman Slaves” in the same year. In a 1994 survey of the Organization of American Historians, it was voted among the 100 most admired American history books. In 2003, the book was celebrated at a session at the meeting of the Southern Historical Association. In 2005, on May 20 and 21, a conference entitled “Slave Women's Lives: Twenty Years of Ar'n't I A Woman? and More” was held at the Huntington Institute in California to again commemorate its publication. The papers presented at this conference were published in the Winter 2007 issue of the Journal of African American Studies. The book was also celebrated in June 2005 at the Berkshire Conference on the History of Women. The papers presented at this conference appeared in the July 2007 issue of the Journal of Women's History.

White was the chair of the Rutgers University Committee on Enslaved and Disenfranchised Populations in Rutgers History. This committee was convened after Rutgers University students demanded a review of the university's relationship to the institution of slavery. One of the committee's findings was that feminist abolitionist Sojourner Truth was owned by the family of the first president of Rutgers, Jacob Rutsen Hardenbergh. Researchers also unearthed a document that revealed that an enslaved man named Will was among those who built the first building at Rutgers. On October 26, 2017, Rutgers commemorated their service to the nation and to Rutgers. The new apartment complex was named the Sojourner Truth Apartments, and the walkway around Old Queens, Rutgers' first building that now houses the offices of the President and Vice President, was named Will's Way.

== Publications ==
- Ar'n't I A Woman? Female Slaves in the Plantation South (New York: W.W. Norton, 1985)
- Our United States (co-authored with Juan Garcia, Daniel Gelo, Linda Greenow, James Kracht; Parsippany, NJ: Silver Burdett Ginn, 1996)
- Let My People Go: African Americans 1804-1865 (New York: Oxford University Press, 1999)
- Too Heavy A Load: Black Women in Defense of Themselves, 1894-1994 (New York: W. W. Norton & Company, 1999)
- United States History: Independence to 1914 (co-authored with William Deverell; Austin: Holt, Rinehart and Winston, 2006)
- American Anthem (co-authored with Edward L. Ayers, Robert D. Schulzinger, and Jesús F. de la Teja; Orlando: Holt, Rinehart and Winston, 2007)
- Telling Histories: Black Women Historians in the Ivory Tower (editor; University of North Carolina Press, 2008)
- Freedom On My Mind: A History of African Americans (co-authored with Mia Bay and Waldo Martin; New York: Bedford/St. Martin's, 2012)
- Scarlet and Black, Volume 1: Slavery and Dispossession in Rutgers History (co-edited with Marisa J. Fuentes; Rutgers University Press, 2016)
- Lost in the USA: American Identity from the Promise Keepers to the Million Mom March (University of Illinois Press, 2017)
- Scarlet and Black, Volume 2: Constructing Race and Gender at Rutgers, 1865-1945 (co-edited with Kendra Boyd and Marisa J. Fuentes; Rutgers University Press, 2020)
- Scarlet and Black, Volume 3: Making Black Lives Matter at Rutgers, 1945-2020 (co-edited with Miya Carey and Marisa J. Fuentes; Rutgers University Press, 2021)
