= Black Against Empire =

2013 book by Joshua Bloom and Waldo Martin

Black Against Empire: The History and Politics of the Black Panther Party
- Author: Joshua Bloom and Waldo Martin
- Series: The George Gund Foundation Imprint in African American Studies
- Subject: Black Panther Party
- Publisher: University of California Press
- Publication date: 2013
- Pages: 562
- ISBN: 978-0520293281

Black Against Empire: The History and Politics of the Black Panther Party is a 2013 book by Joshua Bloom and Waldo Martin focusing on the history of the Black Panthers.

== Reception ==
=== General public reviews ===
Writing in 2013 for the Los Angeles Times, Hector Tobar describes Black Against Empire as an "authoritative if flawed new history" whose "most important contribution... is simply to treat the Black Panthers as the serious political and cultural force they were." As "the most dramatic failing in Black Against Empire", Tobar points to "the authors' lack of critical distance from their subject" which produces images of "Panther leaders who are, for the most part, idealists without noticeable flaws."

=== Academic reviews ===
Writing for Reviews in American History in 2014, Jama Lazerow applauds Black Against Empire as the first authoritative account of the Black Panthers. At the same time, Lazerow notes that one key problem for Black Against Empire is the weak coverage of the Panthers in serious scholarly discourse to this point: "we now have local studies of nearly two dozen communities, but most of that work has not come from historians and is often of dubious quality. The absence of reliable work may explain why the authors typically write in depth only about the places that produced the most sensational events: the Bay Area, Los Angeles, Chicago, New York, and New Haven."

== In popular culture ==
The book is mentioned in the post-apocalyptic film 40 Acres.
