= Anthony Grabiner, Baron Grabiner =

British lawyer (born 1945)

The Right Honourable The Lord Grabiner KC
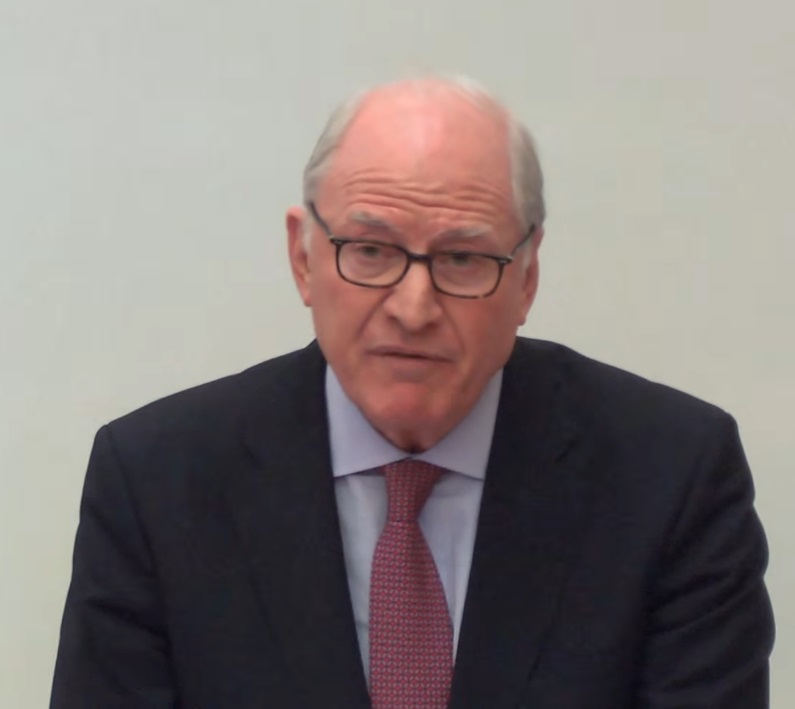
- Grabiner c. 2000

Master of Clare College, Cambridge
- In office October 2014 – October 2021
- Preceded by: Tony Badger
- Succeeded by: Loretta Minghella

Member of the House of Lords
- Lord Temporal
- Life peerage 26 July 1999

Chair of the Governors of the London School of Economics
- In office 1998–2007
- Succeeded by: Peter Sutherland

Personal details
- Born: Anthony Stephen Grabiner; 21 March 1945 (age 81)
- Party: Parliamentary affiliation: Crossbench (2016–present); Non-affiliated (2015–2016); Labour (1999–2015); Party membership: Labour (since 1999)
- Education: Central Foundation Boys' School
- Alma mater: London School of Economics; Lincoln's Inn

Anthony Stephen Grabiner, Baron Grabiner, KC (born 21 March 1945) is a British barrister, academic administrator, and life peer. Between 1994 and 2024, he was head of chambers at One Essex Court, a leading set of commercial barristers in the Temple, and continues to represent leading corporate and financial clients. From 2014 to 2021 he was the Master of Clare College, Cambridge and, since 2015, he has been the President of the University of Law.

Grabiner was non-executive chairman of Taveta Investments Ltd, the holding company of Arcadia Group from 2002 to December 2015. He was a non-executive director of Next plc in 2002, and a member of the Bank of England Financial Services Law Committee from 2002 to 2005. Grabiner was on the boards of Goldman Sachs International and Goldman Sachs International Bank from July 2015 to May 2021.

In 1999, he was made a life peer as Baron Grabiner, and sat in the House of Lords on the Labour Party benches. In October 2015, he resigned the Labour whip over the direction the party was taking under Jeremy Corbyn. He now sits in the Lords as a crossbencher.

== Early life ==
Grabiner was born on 21 March 1945 to Jewish parents, Ralph Grabiner and Freda Cohen. He was educated at the Central Foundation Boys' School. He studied at the London School of Economics and Political Science, where he graduated with a first class honours Bachelor of Laws (LLB) in 1966, and with a Master of Laws (LLM) with distinction one year later. He was further educated in Lincoln's Inn, and was called to the Bar in 1968.

== Career ==
Grabiner is a commercial lawyer with a focus on commercial disputes in areas such as banking and finance, energy, oil and gas, civil fraud, competition and merger investigations, and shareholder disputes. He also sits as an arbitrator in domestic and international commercial arbitrations.

From 1976 to 1981, Grabiner was Standing Junior Counsel to the Department of Trade and the Export Credits Guarantee Department and Junior Counsel to the Crown from 1978 to 1981. Made a Queen's Counsel in 1981, he became a Bencher of Lincoln's Inn in 1989, and a Recorder of the Crown Court between 1990 and 1999. Grabiner served as a Deputy High Court Judge from 1994 to 2004.

Grabiner has acted for a wide range of clients such as state institutions, international banks and corporations. Clients have included the Bank of England, HM Treasury, Terra Firma, Apple Computer INC., News Corporation, Cable and Wireless PLC, JP Morgan Chase, the Society of Lloyd's and Carlton Communications Plc.

Grabiner was non-executive chairman of Taveta Investments Ltd, the holding company of Arcadia Group from 2002 to December 2015. He was a non-executive director of Next plc in 2002, and a member of the Bank of England Financial Services Law Committee from 2002 to 2005.

In October 2010, Grabiner represented Liverpool Football Club in the London High Court and won two cases against its then owners.

In July 2011, Grabiner was appointed by News Corporation as chairman of the management and standards committee established by the company in the wake of the News International phone hacking scandal. It was subsequently reported in The Lawyer magazine that Grabiner would be receiving a fee of £3,000 an hour for his advice to News Corporation.

In 2019 Grabiner acted for the Post Office in a procedural application during the group litigation brought by 555 sub-postmasters. He argued that the trial judge in the group litigation should recuse (dismiss) himself due to concerns of apparent bias. The application was based on the assertion that conclusions reached by the judge in the first of three trials could influence his impartiality in the subsequent trials.

=== Academic career ===
Grabiner was chair of the governors of the London School of Economics from 1998 until 2007. In December 2013, it was announced that he had been elected Master of Clare College, Cambridge University, to succeed Professor Tony Badger in October 2014. In August 2015, Grabiner was appointed as the President of the University of Law.

=== Political career ===
On 26 July 1999, Grabiner was created a life peer with the title Baron Grabiner, of Aldwych in the City of Westminster. From 1999 to 2015, he sat in the House of Lords on the Labour Party benches. On 24 October 2015, he announced that he had resigned the Labour whip but would remain a party member. He was the second Labour peer to resign the whip over the views of the new party leader, Jeremy Corbyn. Grabiner explained his resignation to The Times: "I have nothing in common whatever with Mr Corbyn — and I don't believe we are ever going to win an election." He has sat in the Lords as a cross-bench member since 2016.

Grabiner is the patron of UK Lawyers for Israel, a group referred to the Solicitors Regulation Authority for its alleged use of SLAPPs to intimidate pro-Palestine groups and activities.

=== Taveta Investments ===
Grabiner was non-executive chairman of Taveta Investments Ltd, the holding company of Sir Philip Green behind Arcadia Group from 2002 to December 2015.

In July 2016, Grabiner was denounced in an official report by Members of Parliament in relationship to his chairmanship of Taveta, for having a "remarkably docile attitude" and representing the "apogee of weak corporate governance". Furthermore, MPs stated that "He was content to provide a veneer of establishment credibility to the group while happily disengaging from the key decisions he had a responsibility to scrutinise. For this deplorable performance he received a considerable salary".

== Personal life ==
Since 1983, Grabiner has been married to Jane Portnoy. They have three sons, including the Olivier Award winning playwright Sam Grabiner, and one daughter.

== Marylebone Cricket Club ==
Grabiner is a member of the Marylebone Cricket Club. He was a member of the club's development committee from which, along with John Major, he resigned in protest over the club's failure to properly present members with a development "masterplan" in 2012.

== Surrey County Cricket Club ==
Lord Grabiner is a long-standing member of Surrey CCC. He sat on the Surrey CCC Management Board between 2011 and 2021, and currently serves as President of the Club.

== Other sources ==
- "DodOnline". Archived from the original on 8 December 2006.

Orders of precedence in the United Kingdom
Preceded by The Lord Kirkham	Gentlemen; Baron Grabiner	Followed by The Lord Carlile of Berriew
