= Mia Bay =

American historian

Mia Bay is an American historian serving as the Paul Mellon Professor of American History at the University of Cambridge. She previously served as the Roy F. and Jeannette P. Nichols Chair in American History at the University of Pennsylvania. She studies American and African-American intellectual and cultural history and is the author of, among others, The White Image in the Black Mind: African-American Ideas About White People 1830-1925 and To Tell the Truth Freely: The Life of Ida B. Wells.

== Life and career ==
Bay earned her Ph.D. from Yale University in 1993 and was a professor of American history at the University of Pennsylvania. She has also taught at Rutgers University where she served as co-director of the Black Atlantic Seminar at the Rutgers Center for Historical Analysis, and is a member of the Organization of American Historians. She was awarded the Bancroft Prize in 2022 for Traveling Black: A Story of Race and Resistance.

== Works ==
- The White Image in the Black Mind: African-American Ideas About White People 1830-1925. New York: Oxford University Press, 2000.
- To Tell the Truth Freely: the Life of Ida B. Wells. New York: Hill & Wang, 2009.
- Freedom on My Mind: A History of African Americans, with Documents. Co-authored with Deborah Gray White and Waldo Martin, New York: Bedford/St. Martin's, 2012.
- Race and Retail: Consumption across the Color Line. Co-edited with Ann Fabian, Rutgers University Press, 2015.
- Traveling Black: A Story of Race and Resistance. Cambridge, Massachusetts: Belknap Press, 2021.
