= Journal of African American Studies =

- Discipline: African American studies
- Language: English
- Edited by: Judson L. Jeffries

Publication details
- Publisher: Springer (United States)
- Frequency: 4/year
- Impact factor: 0.20 (2018)

Standard abbreviations
- ISO 4: J. Afr. Am. Stud.

Indexing
- ISSN: 1559-1646 (print); 1936-4741 (web)
- LCCN: 2007215116
- OCLC no.: 54752235

Links
- Journal homepage

The Journal of African American Studies is a peer-reviewed academic journal that publishes papers in the field of African American studies. The journal is edited by Judson L. Jeffries (Ohio State University) and published quarterly by Springer.

== Abstracting and indexing ==
The journal is abstracted and indexed in the Emerging Sources Citation Index, Scopus, Academic Search Premier, IBZ Online, Social services abstracts, and Sociological abstracts.

The journal has a 2019 SCImago Journal Rank of 0.174.
