= Waldo Martin =

American historian (born 1951)

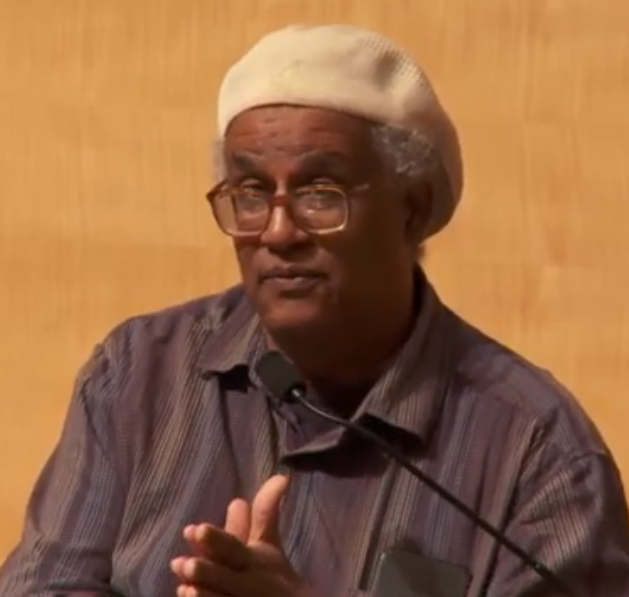
- Martin in a discussion at the San Francisco Public Library in 2017
- Born: April 19, 1951 (age 75)
- Education: Duke University (BA); University of California, Berkeley (PhD)
- Occupation: Historian

Waldo E. Martin (born April 19, 1951) is an American historian.

== Education ==
He received his BA degree from Duke University and his PhD from University of California, Berkeley.

== Career ==
He is the Alexander F. and May T. Morrison Professor of American History and Citizenship at the University of California, Berkeley.

He is a member of the Organization of American Historians.

== Works ==
- The Mind of Frederick Douglass (1984)
- Brown v. Board of Education: A Brief History with Documents (1998)
- No Coward Soldiers: Black Cultural Politics in Postwar America (2005)
- The World of Martin Luther King, 1929–1968 (editor, 2005)
- Freedom on My Mind: A History of African Americans, With Documents (co-authored with Deborah Gray White and Mia Bay, 2013)
- Civil Rights in the United States (co-edited with Patricia Sullivan, 2000)
- Black Against Empire: The History and Politics of the Black Panther Party (co-authored with Joshua Bloom, 2013)
