= Gary Gerstle =

American historian and academic (born 1954)

External videos
- Did Communism Give Us the New Deal Order? w/ Gary Gerstle on YouTube

Gary Gerstle FBA (born 1954) is an American historian and Emeritus Paul Mellon Professor of American History at the University of Cambridge and an Emeritus Fellow of Sidney Sussex College.

== Early life and education ==
Born in 1954, Gerstle received his BA from Brown University in 1976 and his PhD from Harvard University in 1982.

== Academic career ==
Gerstle taught at Catholic University of America and Princeton University, before moving to the University of Maryland, where he was Director of the Center for Historical Studies (2000–2003) and Chair of the Department of History (2003–2006). He joined the Department of History faculty at Vanderbilt University in Nashville, Tennessee in 2006. In the 2012/2013 academic year, he was the Harmsworth Visiting Professor of American History at the University of Oxford. From 2014 to 2024, Gerstle was the Paul Mellon Professor of American History at the University of Cambridge. In 2026, Gerstle will hold the Kluge Professorship of American Law and Governance at the Library of Congress.

Gerstle is one of the United States' leading historians of race, citizenship, and American nationhood. A historian of the twentieth-century United States, he is particularly interested in three major areas of inquiry: 1) immigration, race, and nationality; 2) the significance of class in social and political life; and 3) social movements, popular politics, and the state. Gerstle is the author, co-author, or co-editor of six books and the author of more than thirty articles on these topics.

Gerstle served as the Annenberg Visiting Professor at the University of Pennsylvania and as a visiting professor at the School for Advanced Studies in the Social Sciences (École des hautes études en sciences sociales aka EHESS) in Paris. In addition to France, he has lectured throughout the United States and in Canada, England, Belgium, Germany, the Netherlands, Italy, Brazil, Japan, and South Africa. Gerstle has also lectured widely to the general public, and is often consulted by newspaper reporters, magazine writers, and television producers on matters pertinent to his areas of historical expertise. In May 2007, Gerstle testified on questions of immigration before the Immigration Subcommittee of the House Judiciary Committee on Capitol Hill.

Gerstle is the co-editor of the book series Politics and Society in Twentieth-Century America, which has published more than thirty books, many of them prizewinners. He has served on the editorial board of the Journal of American History and the Board of Editors of the American Historical Review. He is a member of the Editorial Board for Past & Present.

== Honors ==
His book, American Crucible, received the 2001 Theodore Saloutos Memorial Book Award for outstanding book on US immigration and ethnic history, and was named by NPR book critic, Maureen Corrigan, one of 2008's Best Books for a Transformative New Year. He has received numerous fellowships, including a John Simon Guggenheim Memorial Fellowship, a National Endowment for the Humanities Fellowship, and a Membership at the Institute for Advanced Study in Princeton, New Jersey. He was elected to the Society of American Historians in 2005 and named a Distinguished Lecturer of the Organization of American Historians in 2007. In July 2017, he was elected a Fellow of the British Academy (FBA), the United Kingdom's national academy for the humanities and social sciences.

== Books ==
=== Solely authored works ===
- Working-Class Americanism: The Politics of Labor in a Textile City, 1914–1960. Interdisciplinary Perspectives on Modern History (1st ed.). New York: Cambridge University Press. 1989. ISBN 9780521361316. OCLC 299427747.
  - Working-Class Americanism: The Politics of Labor in a Textile City, 1914–1960 (2nd ed.). Princeton, NJ: Princeton University Press. 2002. ISBN 9780521361316. OCLC 48475128. Includes a new preface.
- American Crucible: Race and Nation in the Twentieth Century. Princeton, NJ: Princeton University Press. 2001. ISBN 9780691049847. OCLC 45223578.
  - American Crucible: Race and Nation in the Twentieth Century (New chapter ed.). Princeton, NJ: Princeton University Press. 2017. ISBN 9780691173276. OCLC 45223578.
- Liberty and Coercion: The Paradox of American Government from the Founding to the Present. Princeton, NJ: Princeton University Press. 2015. ISBN 9780691162942. OCLC 944107460.
- The Rise and Fall of the Neoliberal Order: America and the World in the Free Market Era. New York, NY: Oxford University Press. 2022. ISBN 9780197519646. OCLC 1281137811.

=== Co-authored and co-edited works ===
- Fraser, Steve; Gerstle, Gary (1989). The Rise and Fall of the New Deal Order, 1930–1980. Princeton, NJ: Princeton University Press. ISBN 9780691006079. OCLC 803142190.
- Gerstle, Gary; Mollenkopf, John H. (2001). E Pluribus Unum?: Contemporary and Historical Perspectives on Immigrant Political Incorporation. New York: Russell Sage Foundation. ISBN 9780871543066. OCLC 761599737.
- Fraser, Steve; Gerstle, Gary (2005). Ruling America: A History of Wealth and Power in a Democracy. Cambridge, Mass.: Harvard University Press. ISBN 9780674016958. OCLC 845801724.
- Murrin, John; Hämäläinen, Pekka J.; Johnson, Paul E.; McPherson, James M.; Fahs, Alice; Gerstle, Gary; Rosenberg, Emily S.; Rosenberg, Norman L. (2016). Liberty, Equality, and Power: A History of the American People (7th ed.). Boston: Cengage Learning. ISBN 9781305657151. OCLC 1003641226.
