= Charlotte Erickson =

American historian

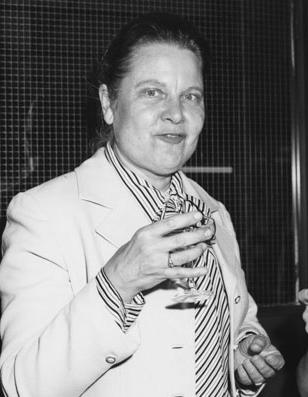
- Erickson in 1978
- Born: October 22, 1923; Oak Park, Illinois, U.S.
- Died: July 9, 2008 (aged 84); Cambridge, England, United Kingdom
- Education: London School of Economics; Cornell University, Augustana College
- Scientific career
- Workplaces: University of Cambridge
- Thesis: The recruitment of European immigrant labor for American industry from 1860 to 1885 (1952)

Charlotte J. Erickson (October 22, 1923 – July 9, 2008) was an American historian.

== Early life and education ==
Erickson was born in Oak Park, Illinois a suburb of Chicago, where her father was a Swedish Lutheran minister. She graduated from Augustana College at Rock Island, Illinois in 1945, and from Cornell University with a MA and a PhD.

In 1944, when she attended the summer seminar of the Institute of World Affairs. She studied at the London School of Economics, between 1948 and 1950, under the guidance of Professor T.S. Ashton and under Professor David Glass.

== Career ==
In 1950 to 1952, she taught at Vassar College.

From 1976 to 1978, she was the Sherman Fairchild Distinguished Scholar at the California Institute of Technology. In 1982, she was the Paul Mellon chair of American History at Cambridge University. From 1983 to 1986, she was chair of the British Association for American Studies.

== Personal life ==
In 1952, Erickson returned to England to marry Louis Watt; they had two sons, Tom and David; their marriage was dissolved in 1992.

== Awards ==
- 1966–67 Guggenheim Fellow in Washington D.C.
- 1990 MacArthur Fellows Program

== Works ==
- American Industry and the European Immigrant, 1860-5, Harvard University Press, 1957
- British industrialists: steel and hosiery, 1850-1950 University Press, 1960
- Invisible Immigrants: the adaptation of English and Scottish immigrants in 19th-century America London School of Economics and Political Science; Weidenfeld and Nicolson, 1972, ISBN 9780297994688
- Leaving England: essays on British emigration in the nineteenth century, Cornell University Press, 1994, ISBN 978-0-8014-2820-3
