= List of newspapers in Washington, D.C. =

This is a list of newspapers in Washington, D.C. These newspapers are published or headquartered in Washington, D.C. There have been over 800 newspapers published in the District of Columbia since its founding in 1790. As of February 2020, there were approximately 75 newspapers in print in the District.

== Major daily newspapers ==
Current daily newspapers in Washington, D.C.
Title	Year est.	Owner	Print daily circulation	References
The Hill	1994	Capitol Hill Publishing Corporation (subsidiary)	24,000; As of December 2012	ISSN 1521-1568, OCLC 31153202
Politico	2007	Capitol News Company	32,000 in 2009	
Roll Call	1955	FiscalNote	30,786	
Stars and Stripes	1861	Defense Media Activity	7 million weekly editions 38 million page views per year	OCLC 44314138
The Washington Post	1877	Jeff Bezos, Nash Holdings	254,379 (daily, 2019); 838,014 (Sunday, 2013); 1,000,000 (digital, 2018)	OCLC 2269358, LCCN sn79002172
The Washington Times	1982	The Washington Times, LLC; the LLC is owned by a diversified conglomerate owned by the Unification Church, Operations Holdings.	59,185 daily (As of November 2013)	OCLC 8472624, LCCN sn82004118

== Special interest newspapers ==
Special interest newspapers in Washington, D.C.
Title	Year est., freq.	Interest	References
The Beacon Newspapers	1989, monthly	Older Adults	
Catholic Standard	1951, weekly	Catholics	OCLC 11760218
County News	1973	County governments, National Association of Counties	OCLC 1643384, LCCN sn82017007
DC Black		African-American	
DC Spotlight Newspaper			
The Georgetowner	1954, bi-weekly	Affluent community in Georgetown and elsewhere in the District	OCLC 8079438, LCCN sn82001168
El Imparcial Newspaper		Hispanic	
Metro Weekly	weekly	LGBTQ issues	
El Pregonero	1977	Hispanic	
Street Sense	2003, bi-weekly	Focusing on homelessness	
El Tiempo Latino	1991	Hispanic	The Washington Post Company
The Washington Afro American	1892, weekly	African American issues	
Washington Blade	1969, weekly	LGBTQ issues	
Washington Business Journal	1986	Business	
Washington City Paper	1981	Free	
The Washington Diplomat	1994	Diplomats	
The Washington Examiner	2005, weekly	Political journalism website and weekly magazine since 2013	
Washington Hispanic	1994	Hispanic	
The Washington Informer	1964, weekly	African American issues	OCLC 10269159, LCCN sn84007874
Washington Jewish Week (National Jewish Ledger)	1930, weekly	Jewish	
World Journal (DC edition)	1976	Chinese language	

== Community papers ==
Current community newspapers in Washington, D.C.
Title	Year est.	Frequency, owner	Area	References
DC Line	2018			
D.C. North			Northeast Washington	
East of the River		Daily online, Monthly in Print, Capital Community News	Anacostia	
The Georgetown Dish	2009		Georgetown	
Hill Rag	1976	Monthly print, online daily; Capital Community News	Capitol Hill	OCLC 39308468, LCCN sn98062538
The InTowner	1968		Dupont Circle, Logan Circle and Adams Morgan	OCLC 13435461, LCCN sn86001289
MidcityDC		Daily online, Monthly in print, Capital Community News	Mid-City	
The Southwester	1968	Monthly, Southwest Neighborhood Assembly	Southwest	OCLC 39641161, LCCN sn98062551
Washington Spark	2004			

== College newspapers ==
- AWOL, American University, 2008
- The Eagle, American University, 1925
- The Georgetown Voice, Georgetown University, 1969
- The GW Hatchet, The George Washington University, 1904
- The Hilltop, Howard University, 1924
- The Hoya, Georgetown University, 1920, OCLC 30597435, LCCN sn98062535
- The Tower, Catholic University of America, 1922

== Magazines ==
- Governing, monthly, 1987, Congressional Quarterly
- Metro Weekly, LGBT weekly, 1994
- National Journal, weekly, 1969, Atlantic Media
- Washington Life, monthly, 1991, Washington Life Magazine Group
- Washington Monthly, monthly, 1969
- Washingtonian, monthly, 1965, OCLC 37264488
- Women's Monthly, monthly

== Defunct publications ==
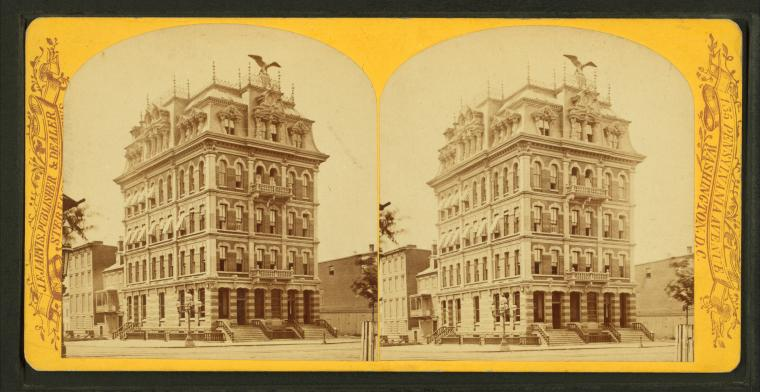
The "Republican" Building was built in 1871 at the southwest corner of Pennsylvania Avenue and 13th Street NW. It was demolished after a fire in 1916.

Some selected, notable newspapers that were published in Washington, D.C. are listed below. See the main article for defunct newspapers founded in the District during the 18th- and 19th-centuries.

- The Bee (1882–1884)
- The Colored American (African-American owned) (1893–1904)
- The Common Denominator (Washington, D.C., newspaper) (1998–2006), OCLC 39376414, LCCN sn98067631
- The Current Newspapers (1954–2019) (community newspapers in Dupont Circle, Foggy Bottom, Georgetown, Chevy Chase and Upper Northwest)
  - The Georgetown Current, Georgetown, Washington, D.C. (1967–2019), Weekly, OCLC 39775819, LCCN sn98062555
  - Voice of the Hill (1999–2010) (The Current Newspapers)
- Daily National Era (1854–1854)
- Daily News (1921–1972)
- Express, Free daily (2003–2019), Nash Holdings, LLC, Jeff Bezos
- Farmers National Weekly (1933–1936), moved to Chicago in 1933
- The National Era
- National Forum (1910-19??)
- National Intelligencer and Washington Advertiser (started by Thomas Jefferson), (1800–1870)
- National Observer (1962–1977), published by Dow Jones & Company
- National Republican (1860–1888), OCLC 8791688, ISSN 2158-8899
- New National Era, New Era (1870–1874) (African-American owned newspaper)
- The Spotlight (1975–2001), antisemitic, right-wing
- The Suffragist (1913–1920)
- The Times, and Patowmack Packet (1789–1791), first newspaper in the District
- Voice of the Hill
- Washington Bee (1882–1922) OCLC 10587828, ISSN 1940-7424
- The Washington Daily News (1921–1972), predecessor to the Washington Star
- Washington Globe
- The Washington Herald (1906–1939)
- The Washington Star (1841–1981), a national newspaper
- The Washington Sun (1960–2010), African American issues
- Washington Times-Herald (1939–1954)
- United States Daily (1926–1933)
- United States Telegraph (1827–1937)
- Washington Times (1894–1939)
- Waterline (published for the Naval District of Washington by the Washington Post Company)
- Young D.C., monthly tabloid by and about teenagers in Washington, D.C. (1991–?)

== See also ==
- Media in Washington, D.C.
- Category:Journalists from Washington, D.C.
U.S. newspapers

Comprehensive

- Lists of newspapers
- List of newspapers in the United States

Frequency

- List of free daily newspapers in the United States
- List of weekly newspapers in the United States

Circulation

- List of international newspapers originating in the United States
- List of national newspapers in the United States
- List of newspapers in the United States by circulation

Foreign language

- List of French-language newspapers published in the United States
- List of German-language newspapers published in the United States
- List of Spanish-language newspapers published in the United States

Specialty

- List of African-American newspapers in the United States
- List of alternative weekly newspapers in the United States
- List of business newspapers in the United States
- List of family-owned newspapers in the United States
- List of Jewish newspapers in the United States
- List of LGBTQ periodicals in the United States
- List of student newspapers in the United States
- List of supermarket tabloids in the United States
- List of underground press in the United States

Other

- List of defunct newspapers of the United States

== Bibliography ==
- S. N. D. North; United States Department of the Interior (1884). "Catalogue of Periodical Publications: District of Columbia". History and Present Condition of the Newspaper and Periodical Press of the United States. Washington, D.C.: Government Printing Office. OCLC 1850475.
- James T. Haley, ed. (1895), "Newspapers: District of Columbia", Afro-American Encyclopaedia, Nashville: Haley & Florida, hdl:2027/inu.30000029292855, OCLC 219597043
- "District of Columbia". American Newspaper Directory. New York: George P. Rowell. 1900. hdl:2027/umn.31951002273861a.
- "District of Columbia". American Newspaper Annual & Directory. Philadelphia: N. W. Ayer & Son. 1922. pp. 143+. hdl:2027/umn.31951001295695n.
- Federal Writers' Project (1937), "Washington Journalism", Washington, City and Capital, American Guide Series, Washington, D.C.: Government Printing Office, pp. 170+, hdl:2027/uc1.b3850087 – via HathiTrust
