= Ronald Reagan Washington National Airport =

Airport in Arlington, Virginia, serving Washington, D.C., United States

- Reagan National in September 2023
- IATA: DCA; ICAO: KDCA; FAA LID: DCA; WMO: 72405

Summary
- Airport type: Public
- Owner: United States federal government
- Operator: Metropolitan Washington Airports Authority
- Serves: Washington metropolitan area
- Location: Arlington County, Virginia, U.S.
- Opened: June 16, 1941; 85 years ago
- Hub for: American Airlines
- Occupants: Coast Guard Air Station Washington
- Time zone: EST (UTC−05:00)
  - Summer (DST): EDT (UTC−04:00)
- Elevation AMSL: 5 m (16 ft)
- Coordinates: 38°51′8″N 77°2′16″W
- Website: flyreagan.com

Maps
- FAA airport diagram
- Interactive map of Ronald Reagan Washington; National Airport

Runways
Direction	Length		Surface
Direction	ft	m	Surface
01/19	7,169	2,185	Asphalt
15/33	5,204	1,586	Asphalt
4/22	5,000	1,524	Asphalt

Statistics (2025)
- Aircraft operations: 297,737
- Total passengers: 24,889,473 ▼5.3%
Source: Federal Aviation Administration, Passenger traffic
- Washington National Airport; Terminal and South Hangar Line
- U.S. National Register of Historic Places
- Virginia Landmarks Register
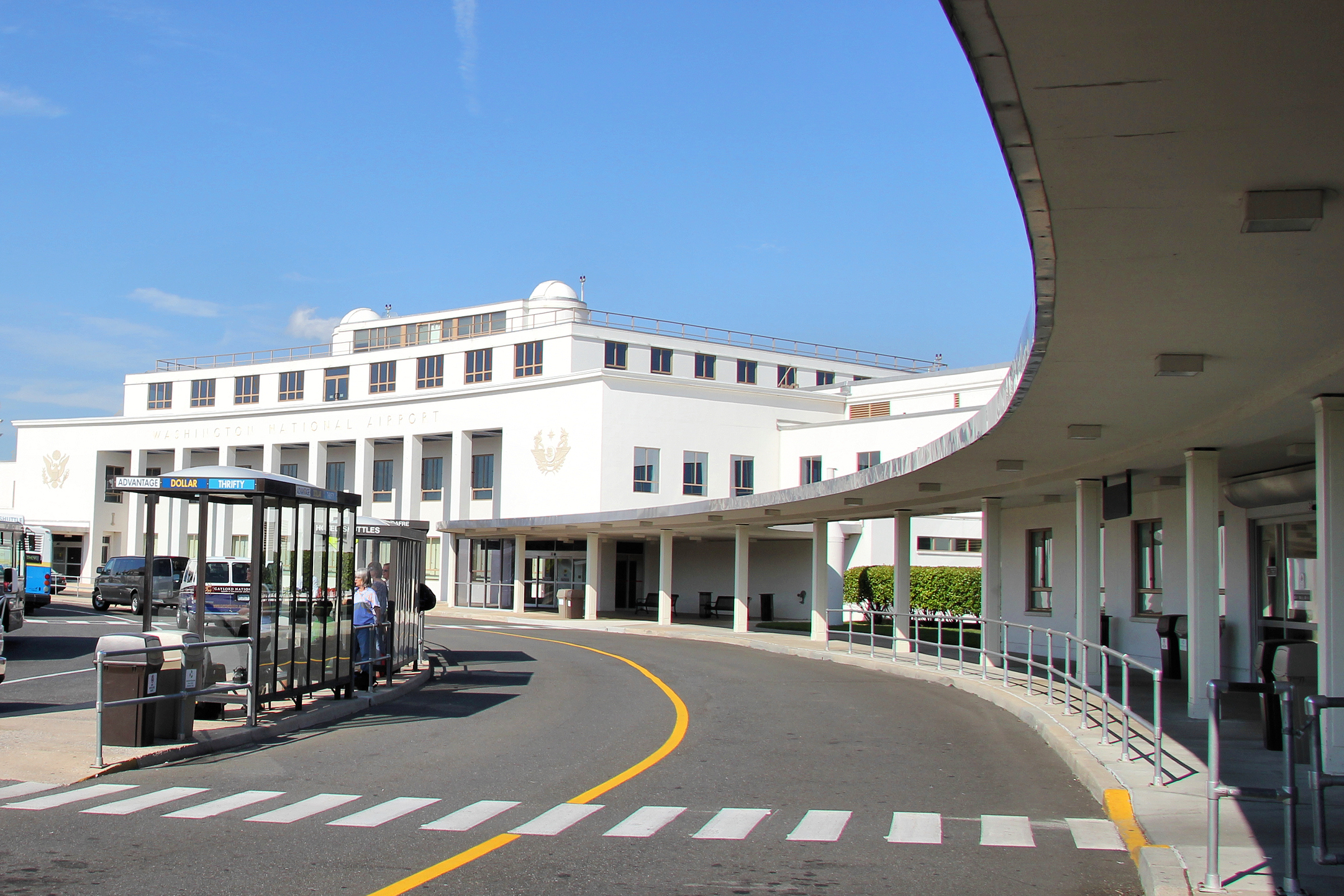
- Area: 861 acres (348 ha)
- Built: 1941, 85 years ago
- Architectural style: Modern
- NRHP reference No.: 97001111
- VLR No.: 000-0045
Significant dates
- Added to NRHP: September 12, 1997
- Designated VLR: June 27, 1995

Ronald Reagan Washington National Airport (IATA: DCA, ICAO: KDCA, FAA LID: DCA) is a public airport in Arlington County, Virginia, United States, five miles (eight kilometers; four nautical miles) from Washington, D.C. The closest airport to the nation's capital, it is one of two airports owned by the federal government and operated by the Metropolitan Washington Airports Authority (MWAA) that serve the Washington metropolitan area; the other is Dulles International Airport (IAD), located about 25 miles (40 km; 22 nmi) to the west in Fairfax and Loudoun counties.

The airport opened 85 years ago in 1941 as Washington National Airport. Part of the original terminal is still in use as Terminal 1; the much larger Terminal 2 opened in 1997. In 1998, Congress passed and President Bill Clinton signed a bill renaming the airport to honor the fortieth president of the United States, Ronald Reagan, who was in office from 1981 to 1989.

Reagan National serves 108 nonstop destinations as of May 2026. It is a hub for American Airlines. The airport hosts international flights, but has no immigration and customs facilities, restricting routes to those with U.S. Customs and Border Protection preclearance facilities, primarily major airports in Canada and the Caribbean. Reagan National is also home to Coast Guard Air Station Washington.

The twenty-seventh busiest airport in the U.S., the busiest airport in the Washington metropolitan area, and the second busiest in the Washington–Baltimore combined statistical area, the airport served 26.29 million passengers in 2024, an increase of 3.3% over a record set in 2023. The airport's main runway is the busiest in the nation.

In 2025, the airport faced controversy over safety concerns following a spate of incidents.

== History ==
=== 20th century ===
The first airport in the area was Arlington's Hoover Field, which opened in 1926. Near the present site of the Pentagon, its single runway was crossed by a street; guards had to stop automobile traffic during takeoffs and landings. The following year, in 1927, Washington Airport, another privately operated field, began service next door. In 1930, the Great Depression led the two terminals to merge to form Washington-Hoover Airport. Bordered on the east by U.S. Route 1, with its accompanying high-tension electrical wires, and obstructed by a high smokestack on one approach and a dump nearby, the field was inadequate.

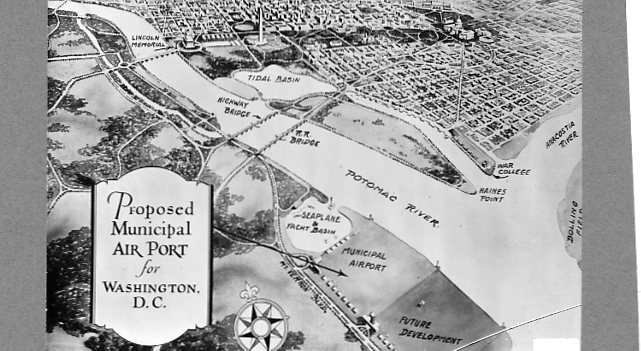
A 1935 drawing of the proposed site for the new airport, then known as Municipal Air Port

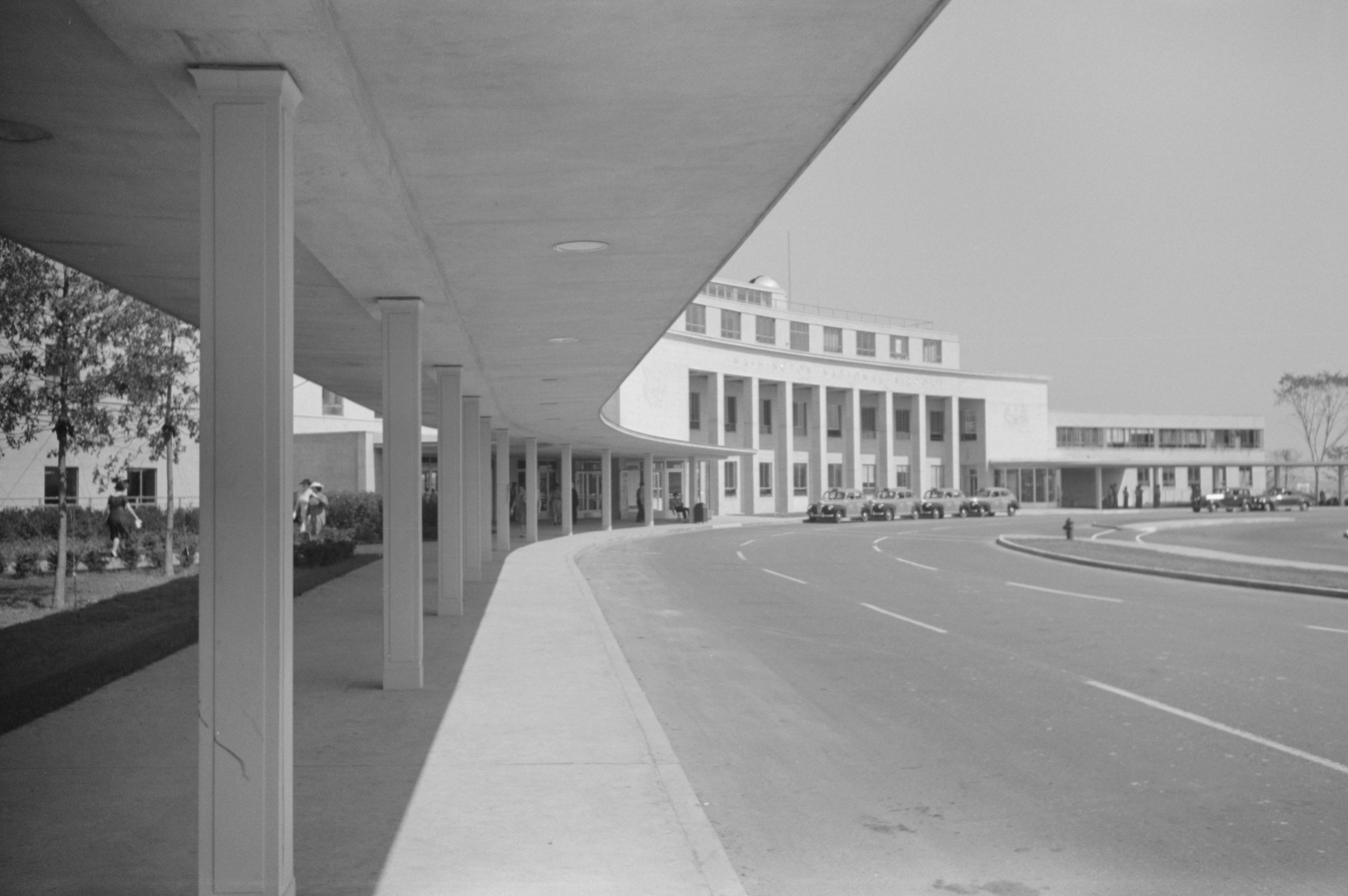
The airport's main terminal in July 1941

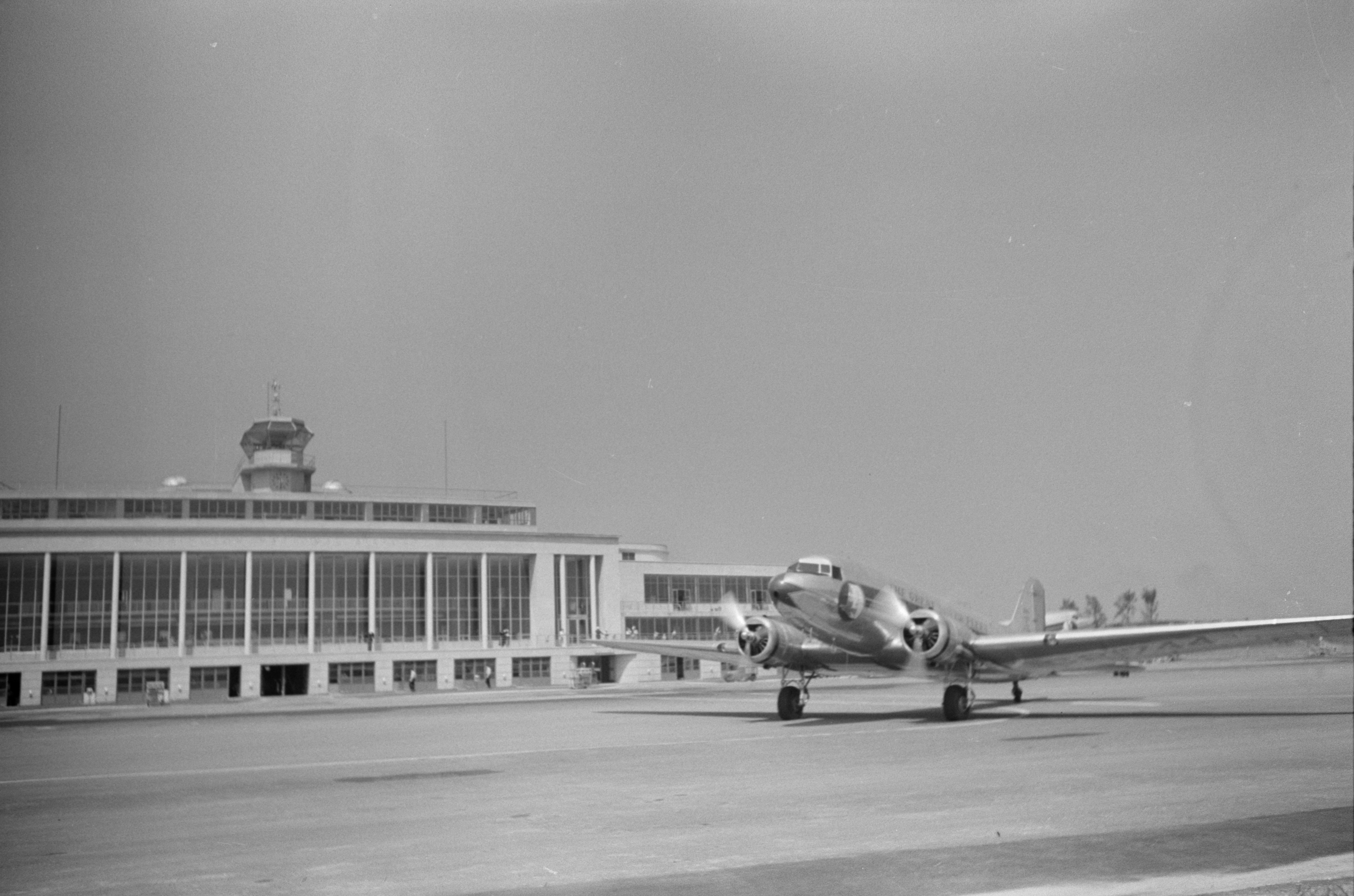
The airport's terminal in July 1941, seen from the apron with a taxiing Eastern Airlines Douglas DC-3 in the foreground

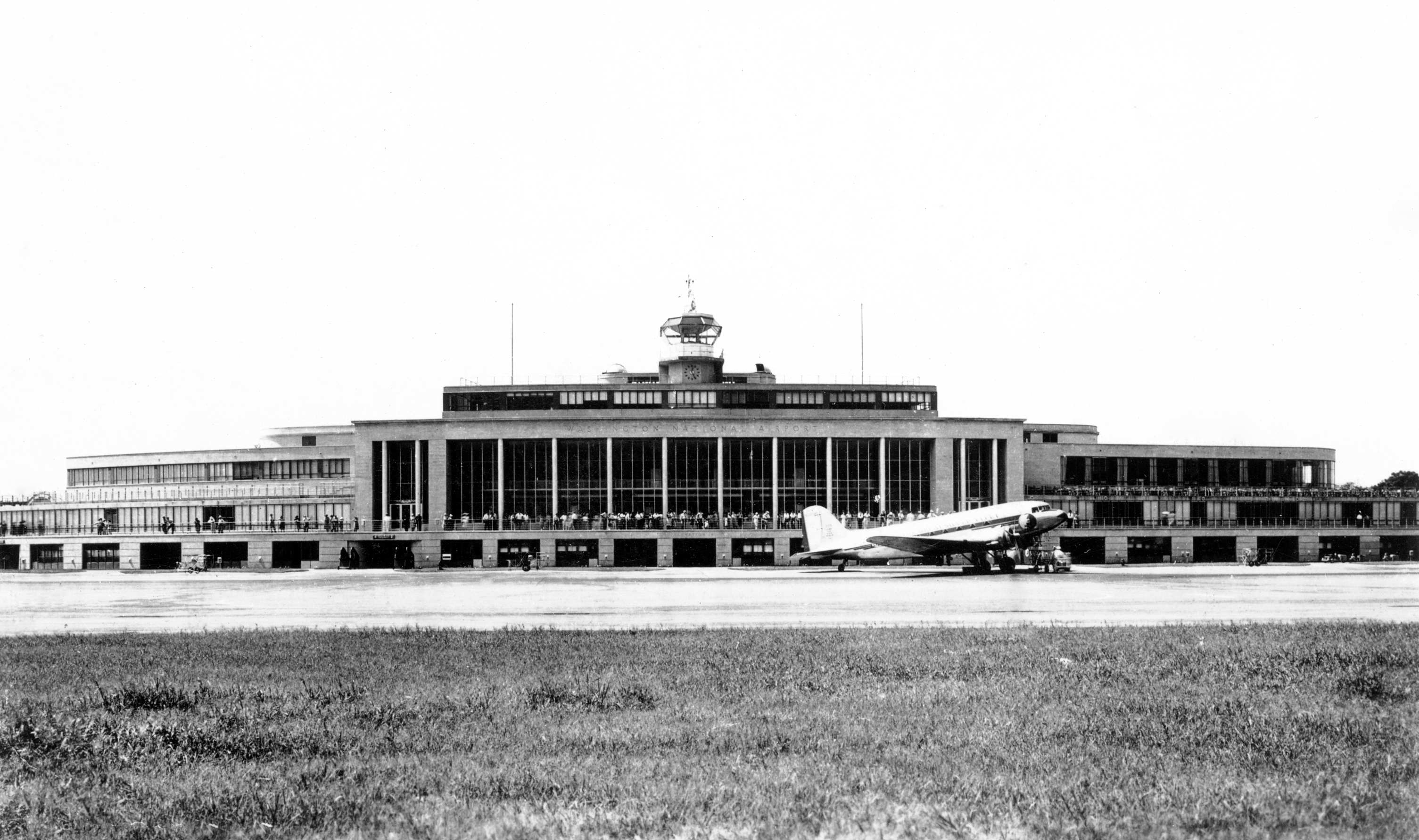
The airport's terminal as seen from the airfield in 1944

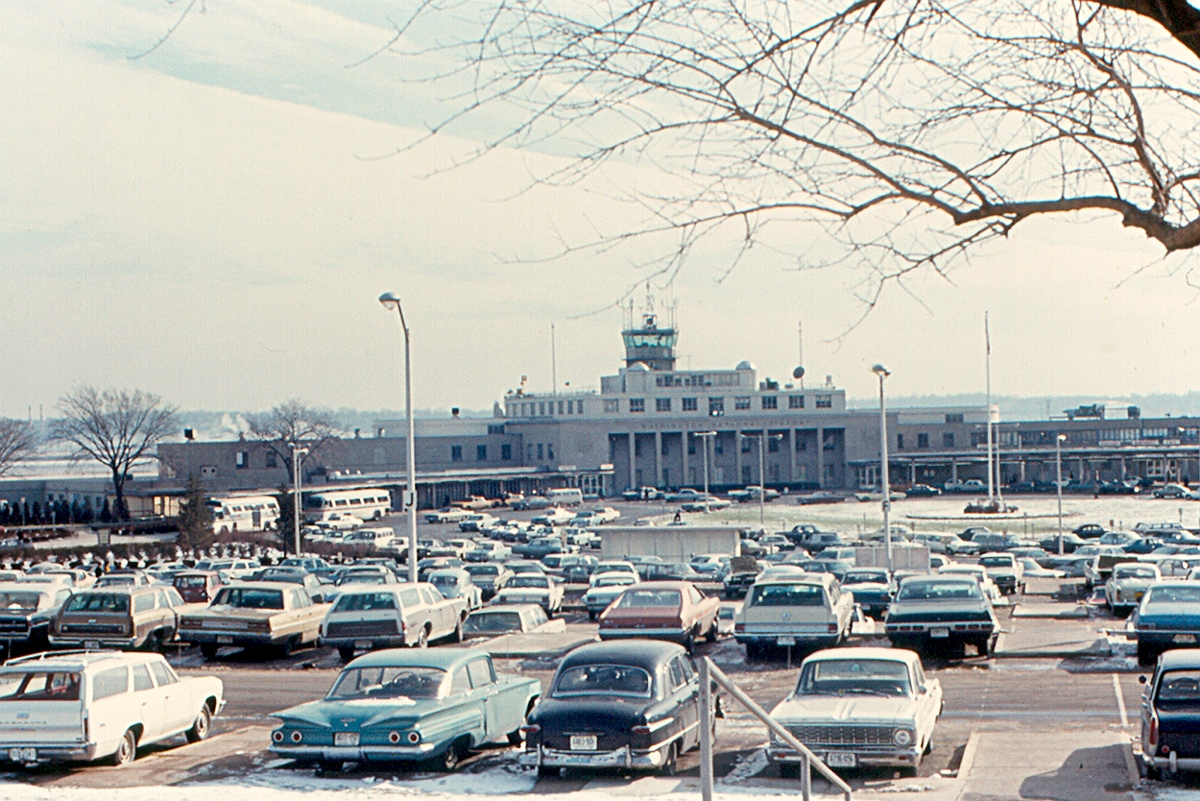
The airport in 1970

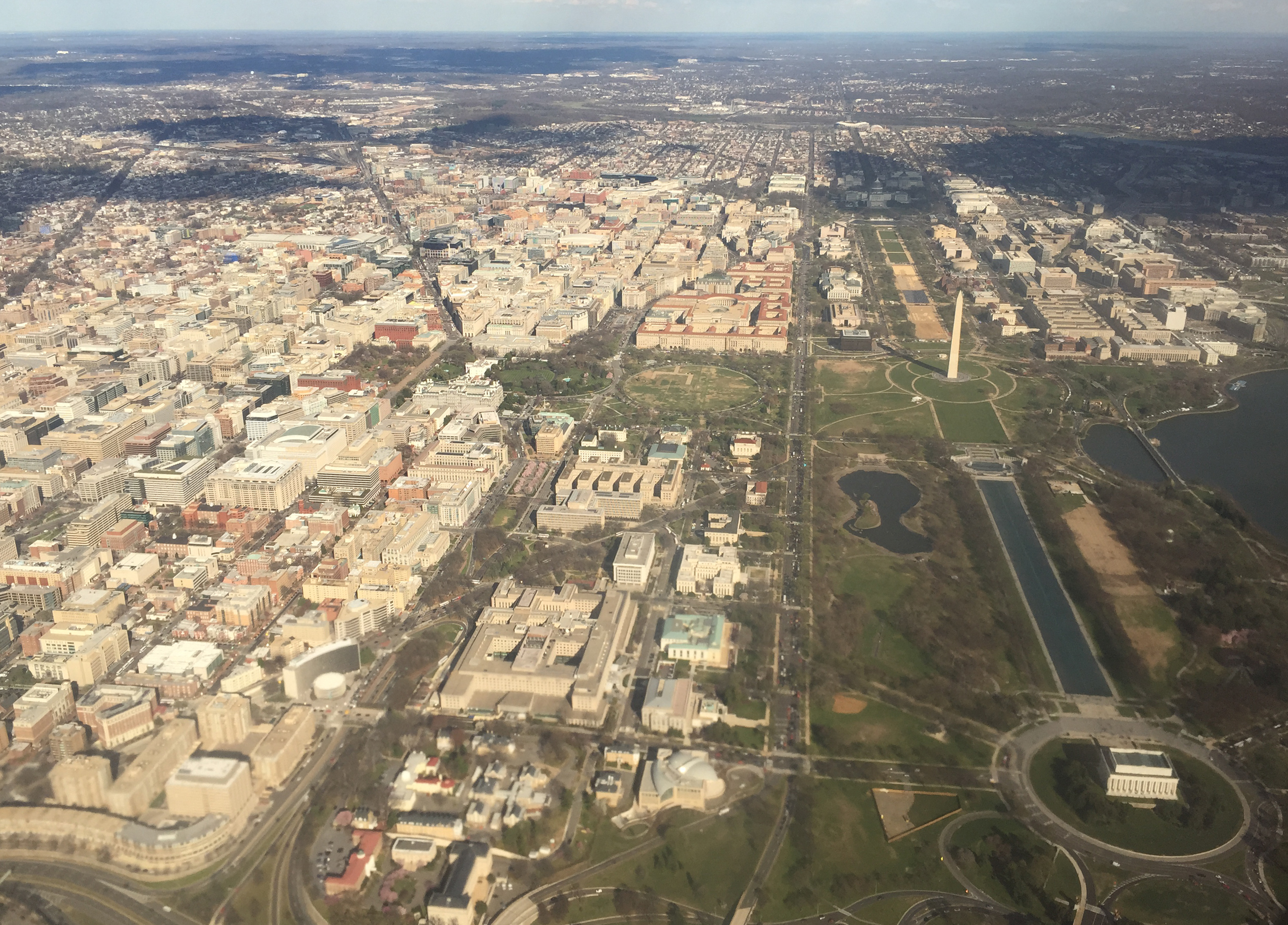
The National Mall and Downtown Washington, D.C., seen following a take off in March 2016

The need for a better airport was acknowledged in 37 studies conducted between 1926 and 1938, but a statute prohibited federal development of airports. When Congress lifted the prohibition in 1938, President Franklin D. Roosevelt made a recess appropriation of $15 million to build National Airport by reallocating funds from other purposes. Construction of Washington National Airport began in 1940–1941 by a company led by John McShain. Congress challenged the legality of FDR's recess appropriation, but construction of the new airport continued.

The airport is located southwest of Washington, D.C., in the Crystal City section of Arlington County, Virginia, adjacent to National Landing. The western part of the airport was once within a large Virginia plantation, a remnant of which is now inside a historic site near the airport's Metrorail station. The eastern part of the airport was built in the District of Columbia on and near mudflats in the tidal Potomac River near Gravelly Point, about 4 statute miles (6.4 km) from the United States Capitol, using landfill dredged from the Potomac River.

The airport opened June 16, 1941, just before U.S. entry into World War II. The public was entertained by displays of wartime equipment including a captured Japanese Zero war prize flown in with U.S. Navy colors. In 1945 Congress passed a law that established the airport was legally within Virginia, mainly for liquor sales taxation purposes, but under the jurisdiction of the federal government. On July 1 of that year the airport's weather station became the official point for D.C. weather observations and records by the National Weather Service, in Washington, D.C.

Until 1946, nonstop airline flights did not reach beyond New York City, Detroit, Cincinnati, Memphis, Atlanta, and Jacksonville. In 1946, Boston, Chicago, Dallas, and Miami were added; nonstops reached Denver in 1951 and Los Angeles in 1954. The April 1957 Official Airline Guide shows 316 weekday departures: 95 Eastern (plus six per week to/from South America), 77 American, 61 Capital, 23 National, 17 TWA, 10 United, 10 Delta, 6 Allegheny, 6 Braniff, 5 Piedmont, 3 Northeast and 3 Northwest. Jet flights began in April 1966 (727-200s were not allowed until 1970). In 1974 the airport's key carriers were Eastern (20 destinations), United (14 destinations after subsuming Capital) and Allegheny (11 destinations).

The grooving of runway 18–36 to improve traction when wet, in March 1967, was the first at a civil airport in the United States.

Service to the airport's Metro station began in 1977.

The Washington National Airport Terminal and South Hangar Line were listed on the National Register of Historic Places in 1997.

=== Expansion and restrictions ===
The runway layout has changed little since the 1956 closure of the east–west runway at the south end of the field. Changes to the terminal complex over the years include:

- Extension of the original Main Terminal (today's Terminal 1) to the south in 1950
- The construction of a North Terminal supplemented the original terminal in 1958; construction connected the two terminals in 1961.
- A United Airlines holdroom complex was built in 1965, a facility for American Airlines was completed in 1968, and a facility for Northwest Airlines and TWA (still in use today as the Terminal A concourse), along with a commuter terminal in 1970.
- The Metrorail station serving the Airport opened in 1977.
- A major terminal expansion including a new air traffic control tower, officially called Terminals B/C, opened in 1997 giving the terminal its current configuration.
- Runways 18/36 and 03/21 were renumbered as 01/19 and 04/22 in 1999 as Earth's magnetic field drifted.
- In March 2012 the main 01/19 runway was lengthened 300 feet (91 m) to add Federal Aviation Administration (FAA) compliant runway safety runoff areas.

Despite the expansions, efforts have been made to restrict the growth of the airport. The advent of jets and traffic growth led Congress to pass the Washington Airport Act of 1950, which led to the opening of Dulles International Airport in 1962. To reduce congestion and drive traffic to alternative airports, the FAA imposed perimeter restrictions on National when jets arrived in 1966, and landing slots at DCA and four other high-density airports in 1969.

The airport originally had no perimeter rule; from 1954 to 1960, piston-engine airliners flew nonstop to California. Scheduled jet airliners were not allowed until April 1966, and concerns about aviation noise led to noise restrictions even before jet service began in 1966.

The perimeter rule was implemented in January 1966 as a voluntary agreement by airlines, to get permission to use short-haul jets at National. Dulles was to continue to serve the long haul markets, limiting traffic and noise at National; the FAA assumed that ground level noise would be reduced because planes would take off light on fuel and be up and away quickly. The agreement limited jet flights to 650 statute miles (1,050 km; 560 nmi), with 7 grandfathered exceptions under 1,000 statute miles (1,600 km; 870 nmi). The spirit of the agreement was regularly violated as flights left National to an airport within the perimeter and then immediately took off for a destination beyond it. Within a year there was a proposal to reduce the perimeter to 500 statute miles (800 km; 430 nmi), but it was widely opposed and never implemented. Overcrowding at National was later managed by the 1969 High Density Rule, thereby removing one of the justifications for the perimeter agreement.

In the 1960s and 1970s, several attempts were made to codify the perimeter rule, but it was not until Dulles was endangered that it actually become a strict rule. In 1970 the FAA lifted the ban at National of the stretched Boeing 727-200, which resulted in a lawsuit by Virginians for Dulles who argued that the airport's jet traffic was a nuisance. That suit resulted in a Court of Appeals order to create an Environmental Impact Statement (EIS). In addition to the court order, there were economic problems at Dulles. Following the extension of Metrorail to National in 1977, and airline deregulation in 1978, traffic at Dulles began to plummet while it increased at National. As part of a slate of efforts to protect Dulles, including removing landing fees and mobile lounge user charges, the FAA proposed regulations as part of the EIS to limit traffic at National and maintain Dulles's role as the area's airport for long-haul destinations. In 1980, the FAA proposed codifying the perimeter rule as part of a larger rulemaking effort. When the rule was announced, airlines challenged it in court; the Metropolitan Washington Airports Policy of 1981 codified the perimeter rule on an interim basis "to maintain the long-haul nonstop service at Dulles and BWI which otherwise would preempt shorter haul service at National." At the same time, the perimeter was extended to 1,000 statute miles (1,600 km) miles to remove the unfairness of having seven grandfathered cities. The perimeter rule was upheld by the Court of Appeals in 1982. In 1986, as part of the Metropolitan Washington Airports Act, which handed control of National over to the Metropolitan Washington Airports Authority, the perimeter was extended to 1,250 statute miles (2,010 km; 1,090 nmi) to allow nonstop flights to Houston with Dallas also being permitted to be served nonstop.

Slots at the airport have been traded in several instances. In 2011 US Airways acquired a number of Delta's slots at Reagan National in exchange for Delta receiving a number of US Airways slots at LaGuardia Airport in New York. JetBlue paid $40 million to acquire eight slot pairs at auction in the same year. JetBlue and Southwest acquired 12 and 27 US Airways slot pairs, respectively, in 2014 as part of a government-mandated divestiture following the merger of US Airways and American.

=== Transfer of control and renaming ===
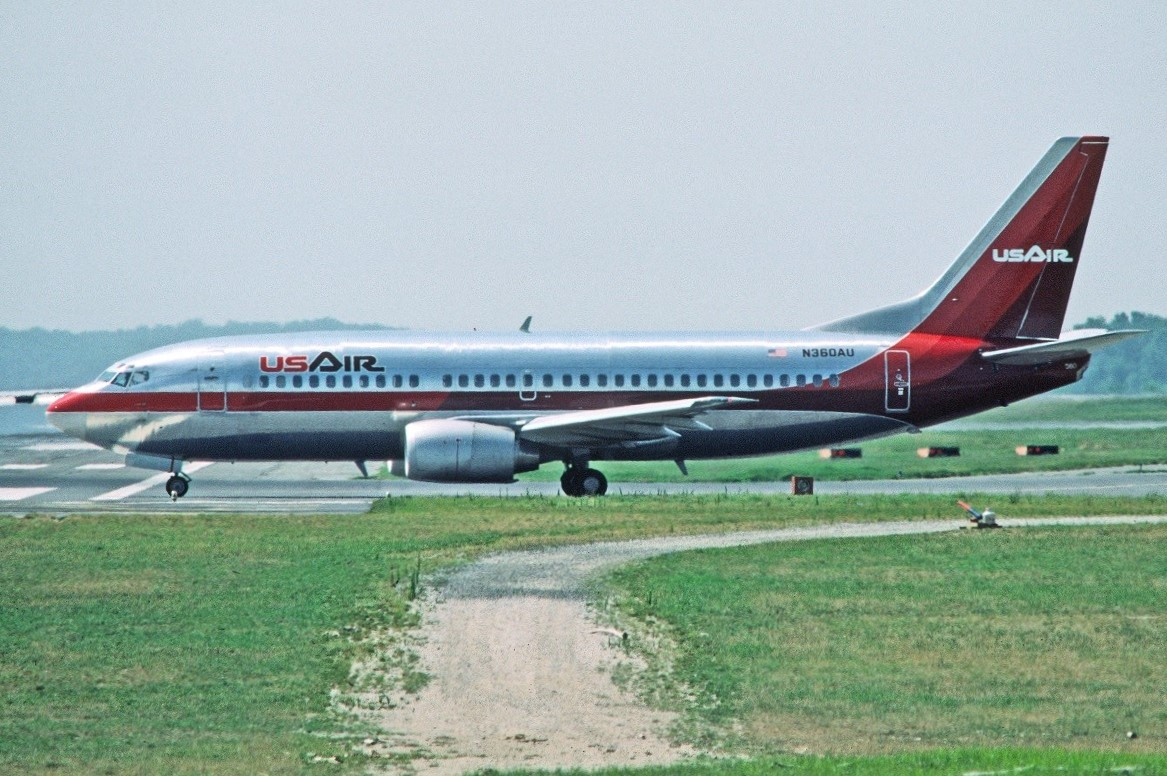
A USAir Boeing 737-300 at DCA in 1986. This aircraft would later crash in 1991 as Flight 1493.

In 1984, the Secretary of Transportation Elizabeth Dole appointed a commission to study transferring National and Dulles Airports from the Federal Aviation Administration (FAA) to a local entity, which could use airport revenues to finance improvements. The commission recommended that one multi-state agency administer both Dulles and National, over the alternative of having Virginia control Dulles and the District of Columbia control National. In 1987 Congress, through legislation, transferred control of the airport from the FAA to the new Metropolitan Washington Airports Authority with the Authority's decisions being subject to a Congressional review panel. The constitutionality of the review panel was later challenged in the Supreme Court and the Court has twice declared the oversight panel unconstitutional. Even after this decision, however, Congress has continued to intervene in the management of the airports.

Ronald Reagan Washington National Airport
- Long title: An Act to rename the Washington National Airport located in the District of Columbia and Virginia as the "Ronald Reagan Washington National Airport".
- Enacted by: the 105th United States Congress
- Effective: February 6, 1998

Citations
- Public law: Pub. L. 105–154 (text) (PDF)
- Statutes at Large: 112 Stat. 3

Codification
- Titles amended: Title 49—Transportation
- U.S.C. sections amended: 49 U.S.C. §§ 49103–49105; 49 U.S.C. § 49109; 49 U.S.C. § 49111

Legislative history
- Introduced in the Senate as S. 1575 by Paul Coverdell (R–GA) on January 27, 1998; Passed the Senate on February 4, 1998 (76–22); Passed the House on February 5, 1998 (voice vote); Signed into law by President Bill Clinton on February 6, 1998

On February 6, 1998, President Bill Clinton signed legislation changing the airport's name from Washington National Airport to Ronald Reagan Washington National Airport, to honor the former president on his 87th birthday. The legislation was drafted against the wishes of MWAA officials and political leaders in Northern Virginia and Washington, D.C. Opponents of the renaming argued that a large federal office building had already been named for Reagan, the Ronald Reagan Building and International Trade Center, and that the airport was already named for George Washington, the first United States president.

The bill stated that it did not require the expenditure of any funds to accomplish the name change; later, state, regional, and federal authorities were required to change highway and transit signs at their own additional expense as new signs were made.

=== 21st century ===
In 2015, The Express conducted an online survey asking people what they call "the airport in Northern Virginia that's not Dulles". The results found that only 31% of people referred to the airport as "Reagan" and only 12% as "Reagan National", compared to 57% dropping the former president from the name. Political preference was shown to have a direct correlation with how people called the airport, with 72% of Republicans referring to the airport using "Reagan," while 64% of Democrats call it "National" or "DCA."

==== Concerns about air traffic risks and ongoing scrutiny ====
On March 23, 2011, the air traffic control supervisor on duty reportedly fell asleep during the night shift. Two aircraft on approach to the airport were unable to contact anyone in the control tower and landed unassisted.

On January 31, 2025, the FAA announced they would restrict helicopter flights from the airport following a mid-air collision two days prior. This had taken place over the Potomac River and involved American Eagle Flight No. 5342, which had arrived from Wichita, Kansas and was set to land at the airport, and a Sikorsky H-60 U.S. Army helicopter undergoing a training exercise, which had previously taken off from Reagan National Airport. The incident was the first major U.S. commercial airliner crash since the 2009 crash near Buffalo, New York. Following the collision, it was noted the airport was also facing scrutiny related to other incidents causing concern over air traffic safety risks, including a May 29, 2024 incident that had involved two planes nearly colliding on the airport's runway, and an incident on January 28, 2025 that involved a jet being forced to abort its first landing attempt at the airport.

On March 11, 2025, U.S. Transportation Secretary Sean Duffy announced an extended ban on helicopters from flying on the route where the January 2025 collision took place while planes were launching from runway 15/33 at Ronald Reagan Washington National Airport. As of April 1, 2025, the airport itself is still facing scrutiny over what led to this collision. On March 28, 2025, another mid air collision between military aircraft and a plane from Ronald Reagan Washington National Airport nearly took place when a U.S. Air Force jet, which was among other Air Force jets that were flying to the nearby Arlington National Cemetery, came close to colliding with a Delta Air Lines plane that was taking off from the airport. The incident, which ultimately did not prevent the planes from landing at their intended destinations, occurred the day after an employee was arrested and placed on administrative leave after fight broke out in the airport's air traffic tower. CBS News has described the situation at the air traffic tower as having been "increasingly tense" since January 2025, with scrutiny still ongoing.

On April 10, 2025, two American Eagle regional jets clipped wings while taxiing at Ronald Reagan Washington National Airport. Flight 5490, operated by PSA Airlines, struck the wing of Flight 4522, operated by Republic Airways. No injuries were reported. The incident occurred around 12:45 p.m., and the Federal Aviation Administration (FAA) launched an investigation into the event.

=== Construction of current terminal buildings ===
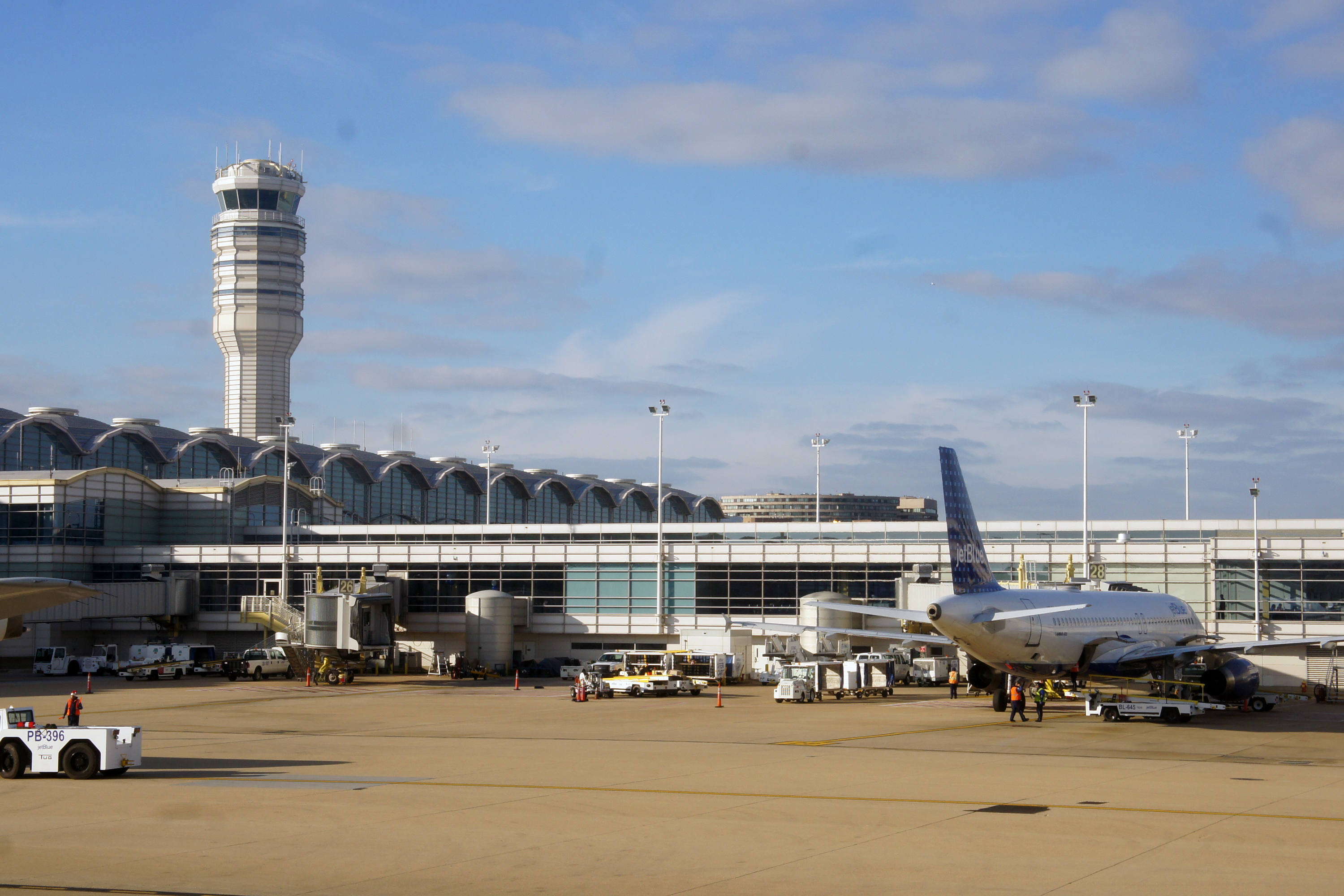
Terminal 2 in 2014

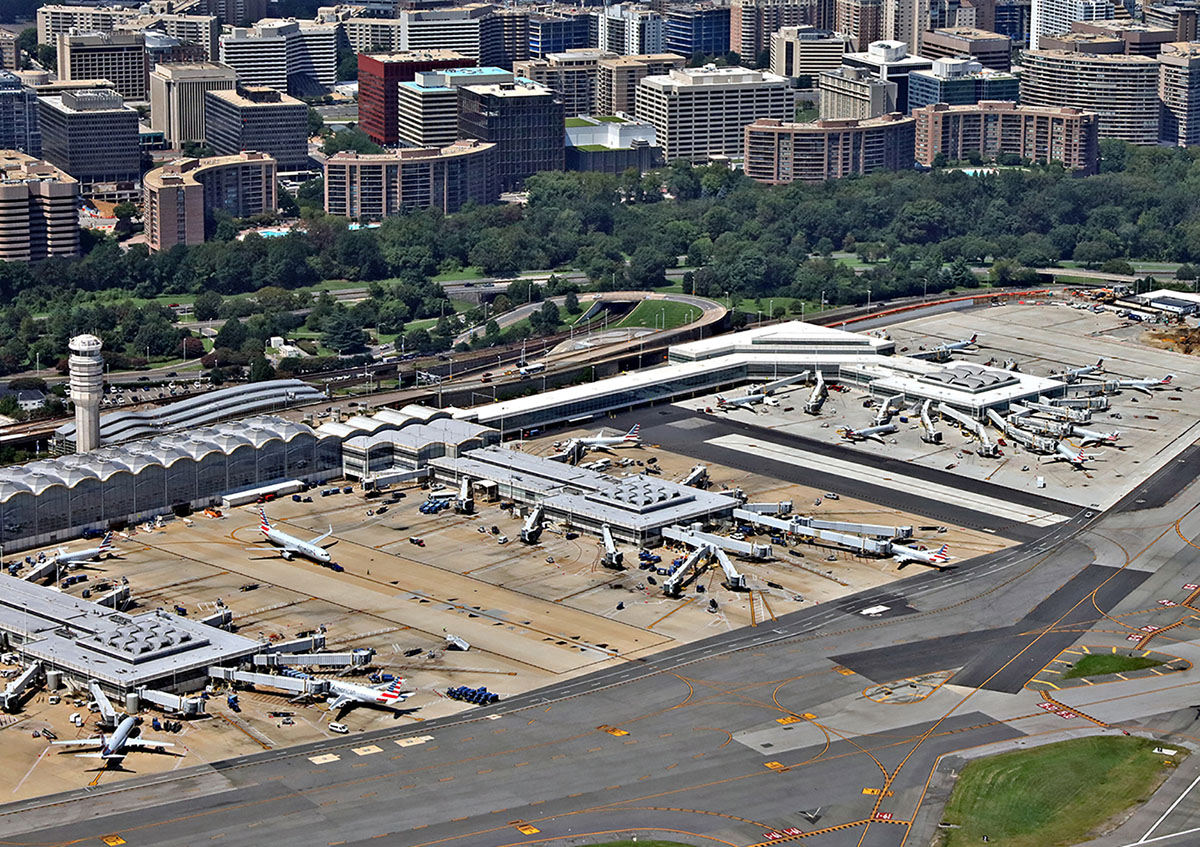
The airport with the Crystal City section of Arlington County in the background

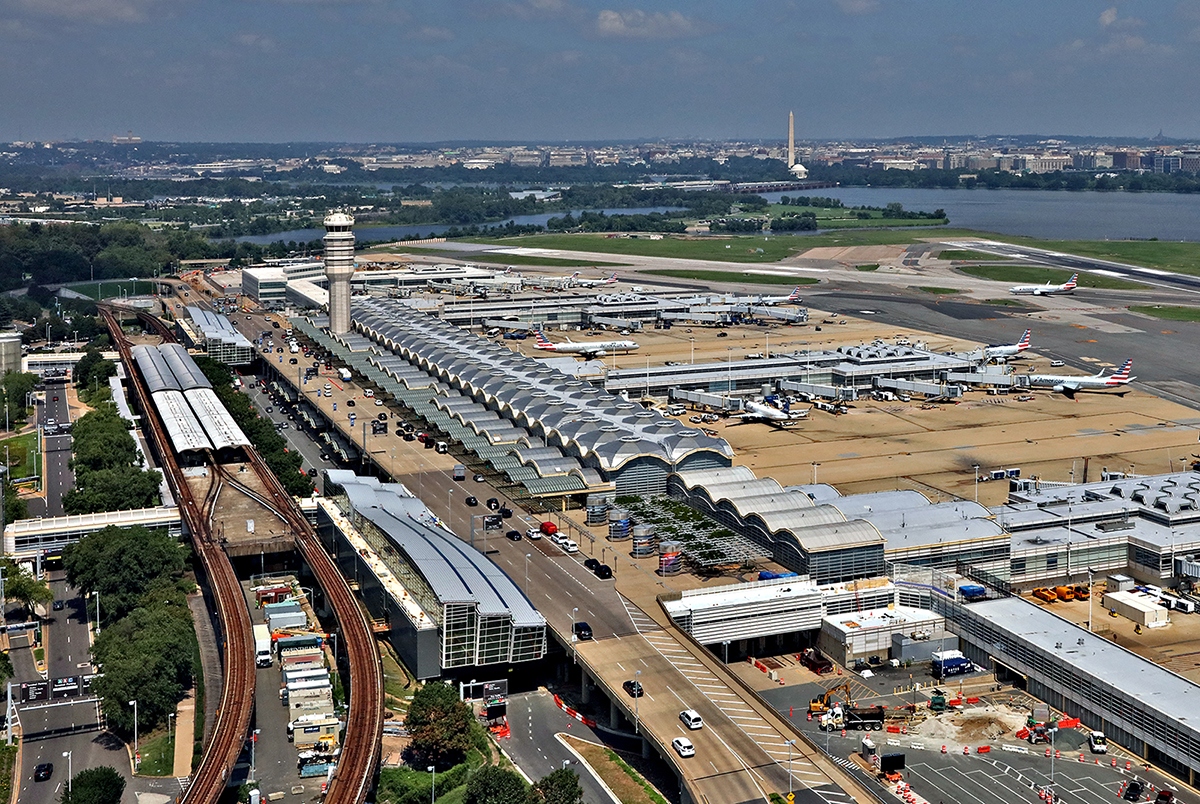
Washington, D.C. (background), and tracks for the Washington Metro (left)

With the addition of more flights and limited space in the aging main terminal, the airport began an extensive renovation and expansion in the 1990s. Hangar 11 on the northern end of the airport was converted into The USAir Interim Terminal, designed by Joseph C. Giuliani, FAIA. Soon after an addition for Delta Air Lines was added in 1989 and was later converted to Authority offices. These projects allowed for the relocation of several gates in the main terminal until the new $450 million terminal complex became operational. On July 27, 1997, the new terminal complex, Terminal 2, and two parking garages, opened. Argentine architect César Pelli designed the new terminals of the airport. The Interim Terminal closed immediately after its opening and was converted back into a hangar. One pier of the main terminal (now widely known as Terminal A), which mainly housed American Airlines and Pan Am, was demolished; the other pier, originally designed by Giuliani Associates Architects for Northwest and TWA remains operational today as gates A1–A9.

MWAA began construction of a new concourse north of Terminal 2 in February 2018 to accommodate 14 new regional jet gates with jetways, bringing the total number of gates at DCA to 60. This replaced "Gate 35X," a bus gate formerly used to bring passengers to and from American Eagle flights that used parking spots on the ramp. Officially called Project Journey, construction was completed on April 20, 2021. In addition, the individual security checkpoints for the four concourses in Terminal 2 were replaced with higher-capacity security checkpoints in two new buildings to the west of National Hall, located next to the two Metro station pedestrian bridges, and in between the two existing arrivals and departures roadways, placing all of National Hall within the secured area of the airport and allowing passengers to walk between concourses without re-clearing security. The new checkpoints were opened on November 9, 2021.

A land bridge is planned that would connect the airport with National Landing directly to Amazon HQ2.

== Operations ==
=== Perimeter restrictions ===
Airlines	Destinations
Alaska	12 slots operating as 2 × Seattle/Tacoma, 1 × Los Angeles, 1 × Portland (OR), 1 × San Francisco, 1 × San Diego
American	14 slots operating as 3 × Phoenix–Sky Harbor, 2 × Los Angeles, 1 × Las Vegas, 1 × San Antonio
Delta	6 slots operating as 1 × Salt Lake City, 1 × Los Angeles, 1 × Seattle/Tacoma
Frontier	6 slots operating as 3 × Denver
JetBlue	2 slots operating as 1 × San Juan
Southwest	4 slots operating as 1 × Austin, 1 × Las Vegas
United	6 slots operating as 2 × San Francisco, 1 × Denver

Washington National Airport is subject to a federally mandated perimeter limitation to keep it a short-haul airport and to keep most long-haul air traffic to Dulles International Airport. The rule was implemented in 1966 and originally limited nonstop service to 650 statute miles (1,050 km), with some exceptions for previously existing service. Congress extended the limit in the 1980s to 1,000 miles (1,600 km) and then again to 1,250 miles (2,010 km). Congress and the United States Department of Transportation have created many "beyond-perimeter" exceptions that have weakened the rule.

Members of Congress repeatedly have sought to extend the limit and permit exceptions in order to allow nonstop service from National Airport to their home states and districts. In 1999, Senator John McCain of Arizona introduced legislation to remove the 1,250 statute miles (2,010 km) restriction. In the end, the restriction was not lifted, but in 2000, the FAA was permitted to add 24 exemptions, which went to Alaska Airlines for flights to Seattle–Tacoma International Airport. America West later obtained exemptions for non-stop flights to Phoenix in 2004. In May 2012, the DOT granted new exemptions for Alaska to serve Portland, JetBlue to serve San Juan, Southwest to serve Austin and Virgin America to serve San Francisco. American, Delta Air Lines, United and US Airways were also each allowed to exchange a pair of in-perimeter slots for an equal number of beyond-perimeter slots.

In 2023, members of Congress from Texas, including Senators Ted Cruz and John Cornyn, along with Representatives Chip Roy and Greg Casar, proposed softening the perimeter rules in an FAA reauthorization bill. The efforts were opposed by senators from Virginia and Maryland, along with American Airlines (which has a hub at Reagan) and United Airlines (which has a hub at Dulles), citing an FAA memo and statistics showing that Reagan has a high rate of delays and that additional flights may exceed its capacity. Controversy over the proposal held up the bill for a year. In 2024, a deal was reached to add five additional perimeter-exempt roundtrip slots to Reagan to the FAA authorization bill, which ultimately passed Congress and was signed by President Joe Biden. After the bill was signed, airlines began applying for the new slots. The U.S. Department of Transportation issued permits for new daily roundtrip destinations to Alaska Airlines for San Diego, which was previously served by US Airways; American Airlines for San Antonio, the second-largest market without an existing non-stop flight; Delta Air Lines for Seattle, as the second carrier on the route; Southwest for Las Vegas, as the second carrier on the route; and United Airlines for San Francisco, for an additional roundtrip to the city that it was already serving from Reagan. Applications for the new slots from Frontier Airlines, JetBlue Airlines, and Spirit Airlines were rejected.

=== Runways ===
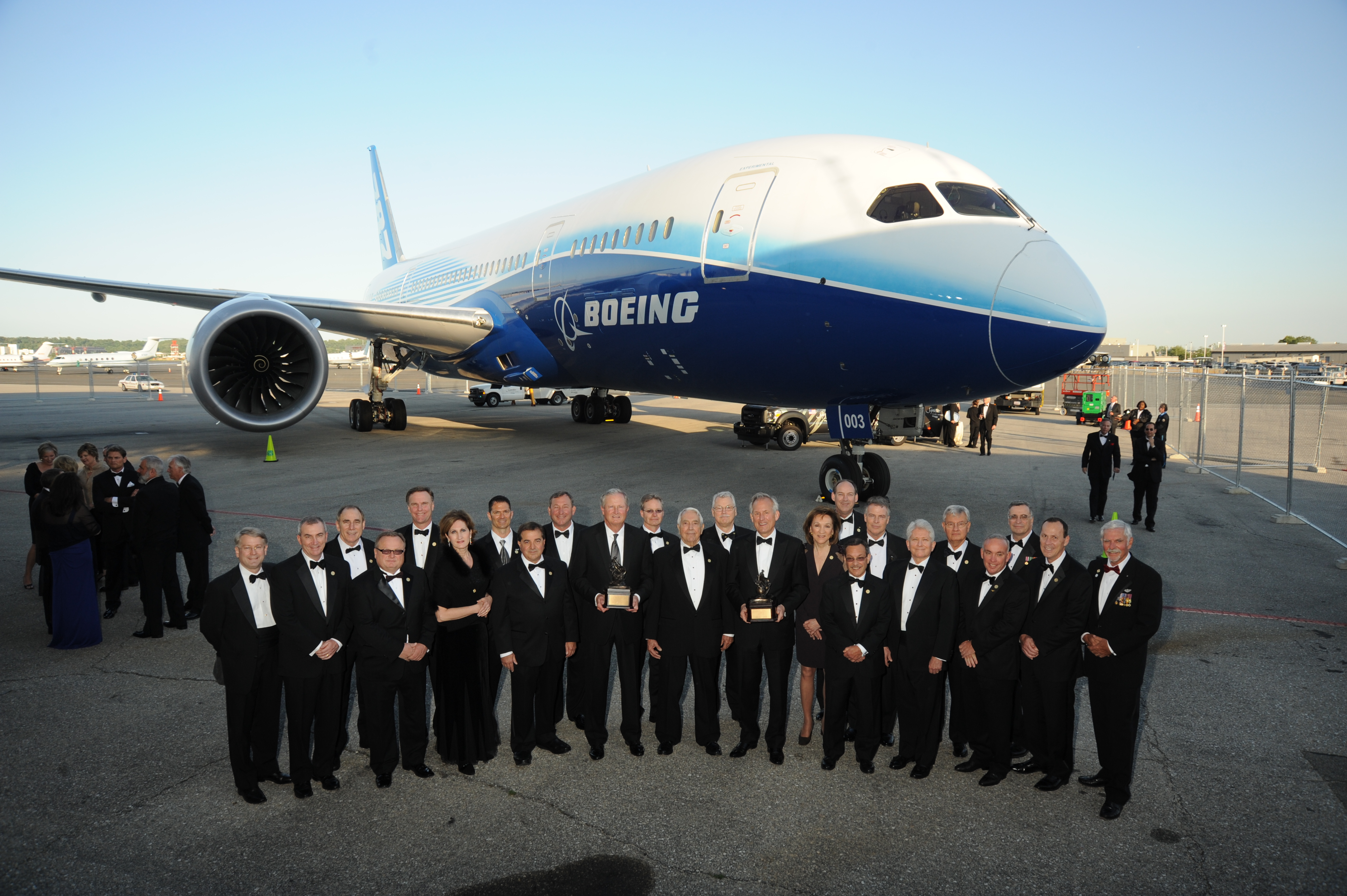
Boeing flew a 787-8 Dreamliner into DCA in 2011. It is one of the only wide-body aircraft to ever land at the airport.

The airport has three intersecting runways: 01/19, 15/33, and 04/22. Runways 01/19 are 7,169 feet (2,185 m) long. Runway 01 handles approximately 57% of arrivals and is primarily used during "north operations," when planes arrive from the south and depart to the north. Runway 19 accounts for about 38% of arrivals and is used during "south operations," when planes arrive from the north and depart to the south. During north operations, intermittent arrivals—around 4%—occur on Runway 33, depending on traffic demands and separation requirements. Runway 33 is typically limited to smaller aircraft due to its relatively short 5,204-foot-long (1,586 m) surface. The 5,000-foot-long (1,500 m) runways 04/22 are too short for commercial aircraft arrivals, but Runway 04 is occasionally used for commercial aircraft departures.

=== Approach patterns ===
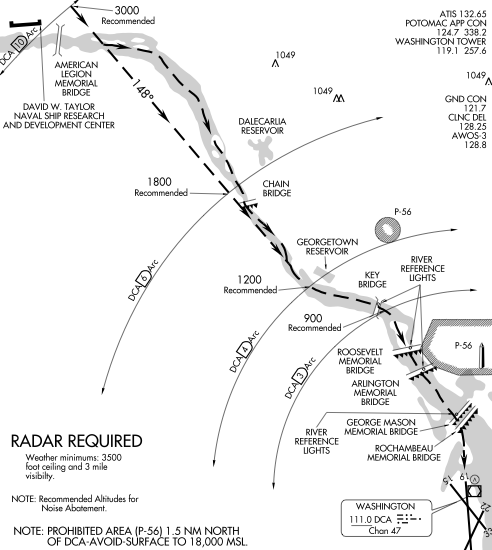
Many pilots regard the Potomac River approach pattern at National Airport as one of the most challenging landing approaches in the United States.

Reagan National Airport has some of the strictest noise restrictions in the country. In addition, due to security concerns, the areas surrounding the National Mall and U.S. Naval Observatory in central Washington are prohibited airspace up to 18,000 feet (5,500 m). Due to these restrictions, pilots approaching from the north are generally required to follow the path of the Potomac River and turn just before landing. This approach is known as the River Visual. Similarly, flights taking off to the north are required to climb quickly and turn left.

The River Visual airport approach is only possible with a ceiling of at least 3,500 feet (1,100 m) and visibility of 3 statute miles (4.8 km) or more. There are lights on the Key Bridge, Theodore Roosevelt Bridge, Arlington Memorial Bridge and the George Mason Memorial Bridge to aid pilots following the river. Aircraft using the approach can be observed from various parks on the river's west bank. Passengers on the left side of an airplane can see the Capitol, the Washington Monument, the Lincoln Memorial, the Jefferson Memorial, the World War II Memorial, Georgetown University, the National Mall, portions of Downtown Washington, D.C. (including the roof of Capital One Arena), and the White House. Passengers on the right side can see Central Intelligence Agency headquarters, Arlington National Cemetery, the Pentagon, eastern Arlington, including portions of Rosslyn, Clarendon, Ballston, Crystal City, and the United States Air Force Memorial.

When the River Visual is not available due to visibility or winds, aircraft may fly an offset localizer or GPS approach to Runway 19 along a similar course (flying a direct approach course on instruments as far as Rosslyn, and then turning to align with the runway visually moments before touchdown). Most airliners are also capable of performing a VOR or GPS approach to the shorter Runway 15/33. Northbound visual and ILS approaches to Runway 1 are also sometimes used; these approaches follow the Potomac River from the south and overfly the Woodrow Wilson Bridge.

=== Special security measures ===
In 1938, Franklin D. Roosevelt issued Executive Order No. 7910, creating the first restricted airspace around the District of Columbia. This would be superseded by a number of executive orders clarifying the boundaries of the airspace until 1966, when it was codified into Title 14, Code of Federal Regulations, part 73. Title 14 created Prohibited Airspace 56 A and B (P-56A and P-56B). P-56A restricted flight around the National Mall, White House, and United States Capitol Building, while P-56B restricted flight in a half-mile radius from the center of the U.S. Naval Observatory. Only aircraft supporting the United States Secret Service, Office of the President, or some government agencies are permitted within the prohibited airspace.

In the aftermath of the September 11, 2001, attacks, a Flight Restricted Zone (FRZ) was put into effect. Extending 13–15 nmi (15–17 mi; 24–28 km) around the airport, only scheduled commercial flights and governmental flights are allowed into the zone without a waiver from the Federal Aviation Administration. Charter flights for the U.S. government are permitted to land at the airport and Joint Base Andrews under certain conditions.

After the September 11 attacks, the airport was closed for several weeks, and security was tightened when it reopened. Increased security measures included:

- A ban on aircraft with more than 156 seats (lifted on April 27, 2002)
- A ban on the "River Visual" approach (lifted on April 27, 2002)
- A requirement that, 30 minutes prior to landing or following takeoff, passengers were required to remain seated; if anyone stood up, the aircraft was to be diverted to Dulles International Airport under military escort and the person standing would be detained and questioned by federal law enforcement officials (lifted in July 2005)
- A ban on general aviation (lifted in October 2005, subject to the restrictions below)

On October 18, 2005, National Airport was reopened to general aviation on a limited basis (48 operations per day) and under restrictions: passenger and crew manifests must be submitted to the Transportation Security Administration 24 hours in advance, and all planes must pass through one of roughly 70 "gateway airports" where re-inspections of aircraft, passengers, and baggage take place. An armed security officer must be on board before departing a gateway airport.

== Terminals and facilities ==
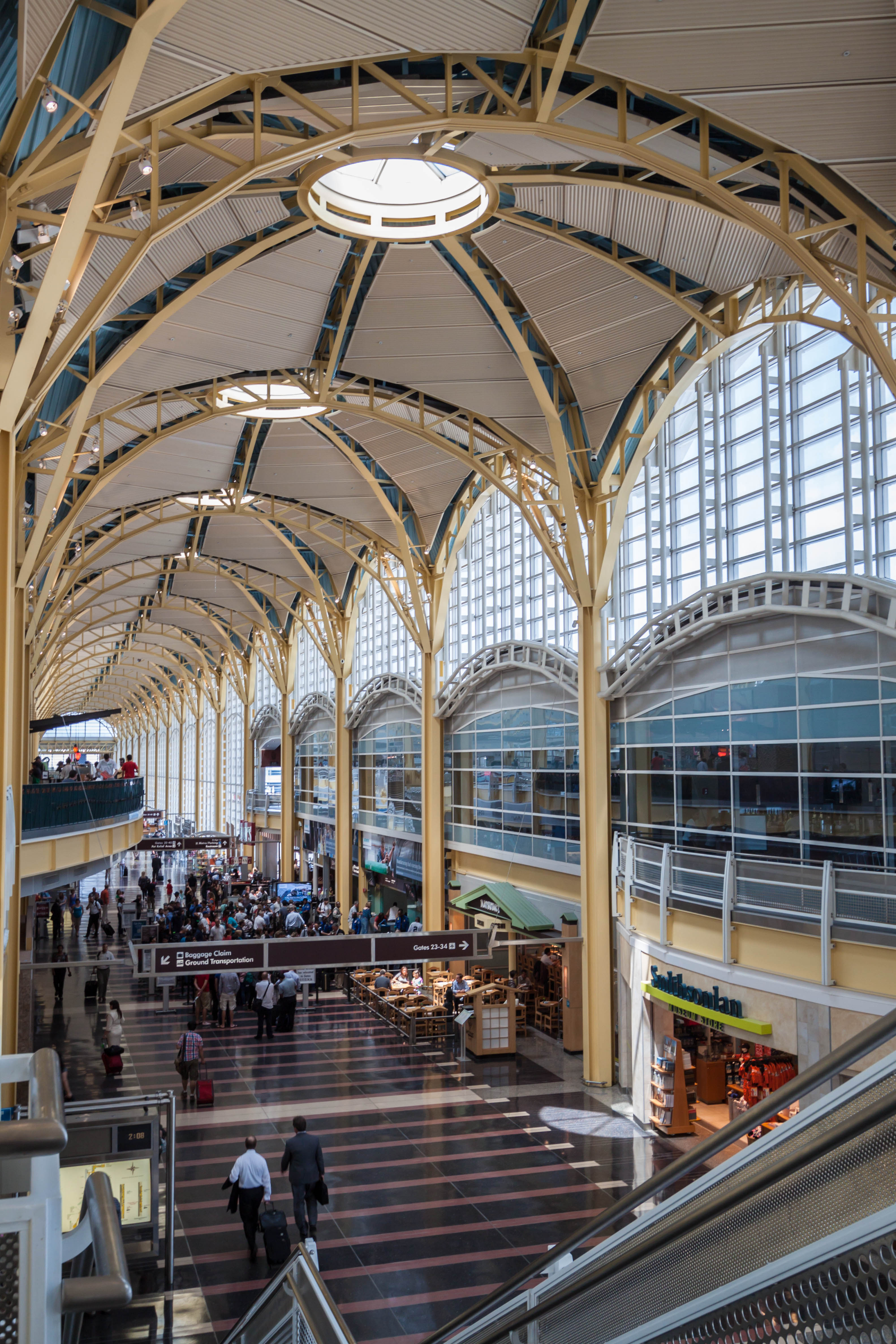
National Hall in Terminal 2

DCA has 59 gates with jetways: 9 gates in Terminal 1 and 50 gates in Terminal 2 (13 gates in Concourse B, 12 in Concourse C, 11 in Concourse D, and 14 in Concourse E). The two terminals are not connected to each other post-security. A new terminal and gate numbering scheme was implemented in 2022. Previously Terminal 1 was Terminal A, and Terminal 2 was Terminal B/C as it is one building. All gates also now have a letter, A through E for each of the five concourses. Therefore, Gate 33 became Gate C33. Other changes include B Parking and C Parking, becoming Parking 2 South and Parking 2 North.

=== Terminal 1 ===
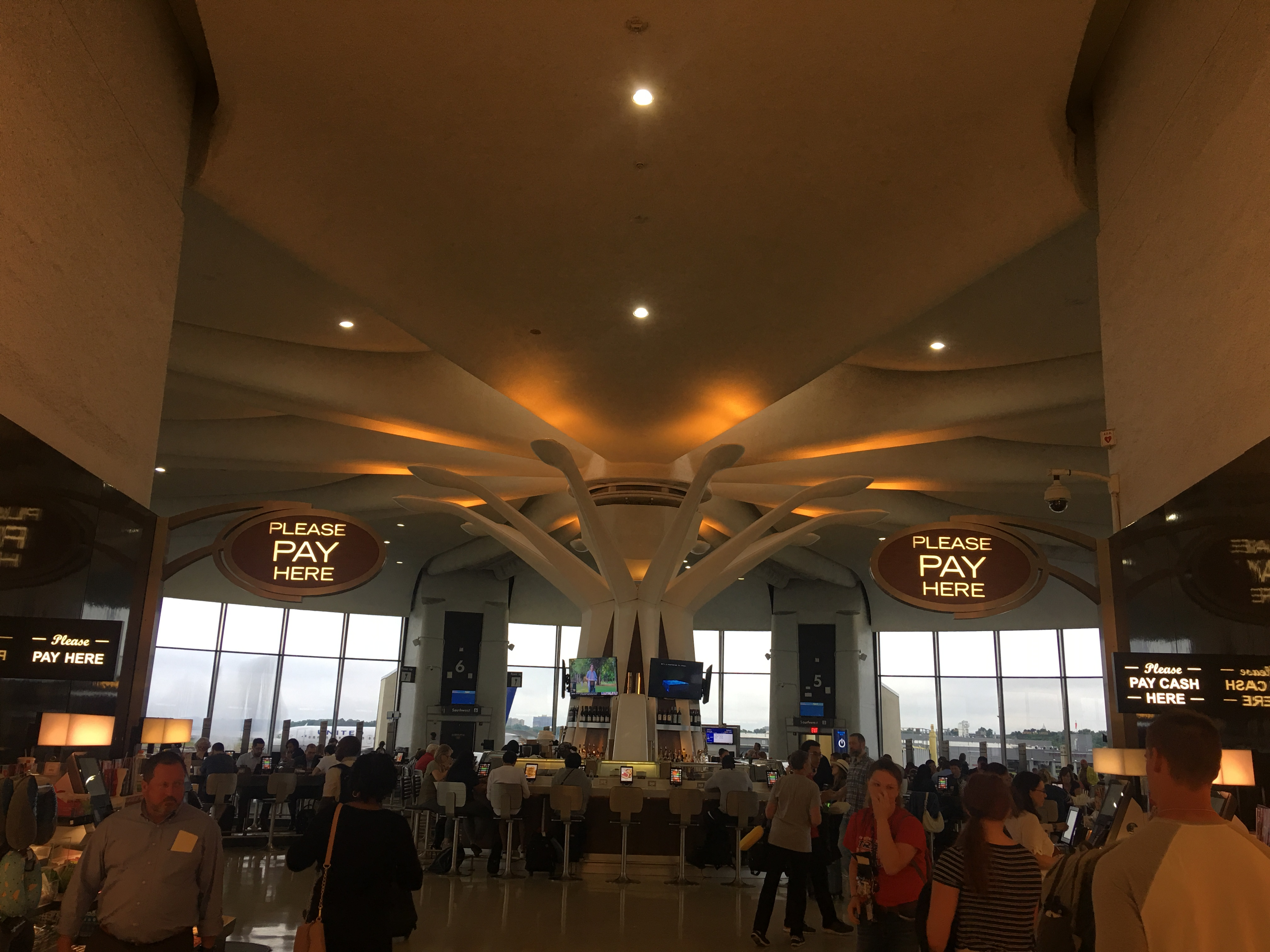
Gate area of Terminal 1

Designed by architect Charles M. Goodman, terminal 1 opened in 1941 and was expanded in 1955 to accommodate more passengers and airlines. The exterior of this terminal has had its original architecture restored, with the airside façade restored in 2004 and the landside façade restored in 2008. The terminal underwent a $37 million renovation that modernized the airport's look by bringing in brighter lighting, more windows, and new flooring. The project was completed in 2014 along with a new expanded TSA security checkpoint. In 2014, additional renovations were announced including new upgraded concessions and further structural improvements, the project was completed in 2015.

Terminal 1 contains gates A1–A9. It houses operations from Air Canada Express, Frontier, and Southwest, with Southwest having the largest presence in Terminal 1.

A statue of Ronald Reagan outside of Terminal A was unveiled in 2011.

=== Terminal 2 ===
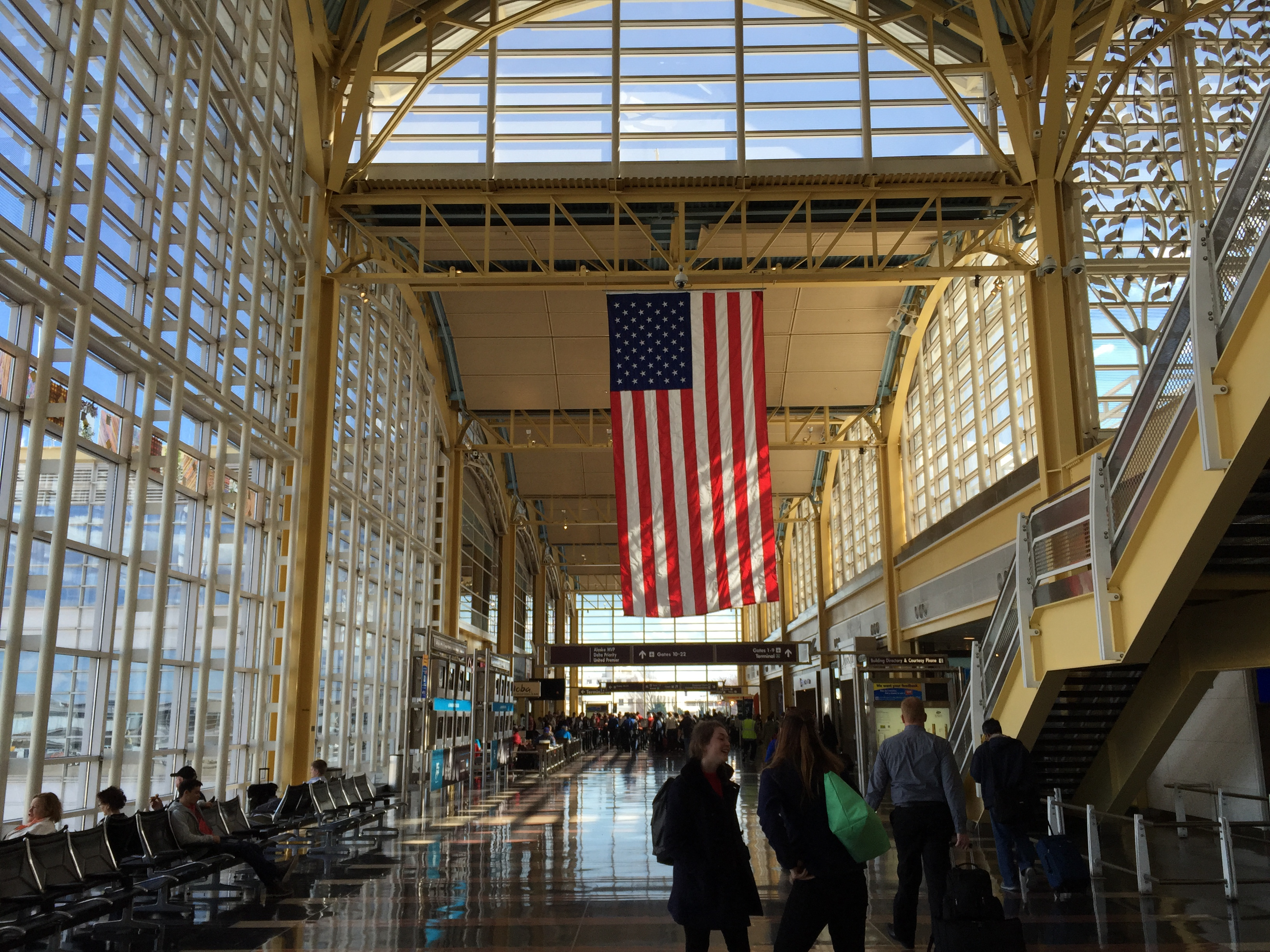
Inside the departure area

Terminal 2 is the airport's newer and larger terminal; the terminal opened in 1997 and replaced a collection of airline-specific terminals built during the 1960s. The new terminal (Concourses B-D) was designed by architect Cesar Pelli and houses 35 gates. The terminal is directly connected to the WMATA airport station via indoor pedestrian bridges. Concourse E, which expanded Terminal 2, opened in 2021 as a replacement for Gate 35X, which was a bus gate.

Terminal 2 has four concourses. Concourse B (Gates B10–B22) houses Alaska Airlines, Delta, and United. Concourse C (Gates C23–C34) houses American and JetBlue. Concourse D (Gates D35–D45) is exclusive to American for their hub at DCA along with Concourse E (Gates E46–E59) that houses American Eagle and American. The corridor/hall connecting the four concourses of Terminal 2 is known as National Hall.

=== Lounges ===
There are several airport lounges at the airport. There are three American Airlines Admirals Clubs in Terminal 2: one near gate C24 in Concourse C, one in Concourse D near gate D36, and one in Concourse E near gate E47. In Terminal 2, Concourse B, there is a Delta Sky Club near gate B15 and a United Club near gate B10. In Terminal 1, there is a USO lounge for retired and active military members pre-security. Originally scheduled for 2022, an American Express Centurion Lounge is in National Hall by the B Gates, which opened on July 17, 2024. The Capital One Landing lounge, a collaboration with chef José Andrés, opened in November 2024 in Terminal 2, Concourse D.

=== Ground transportation ===
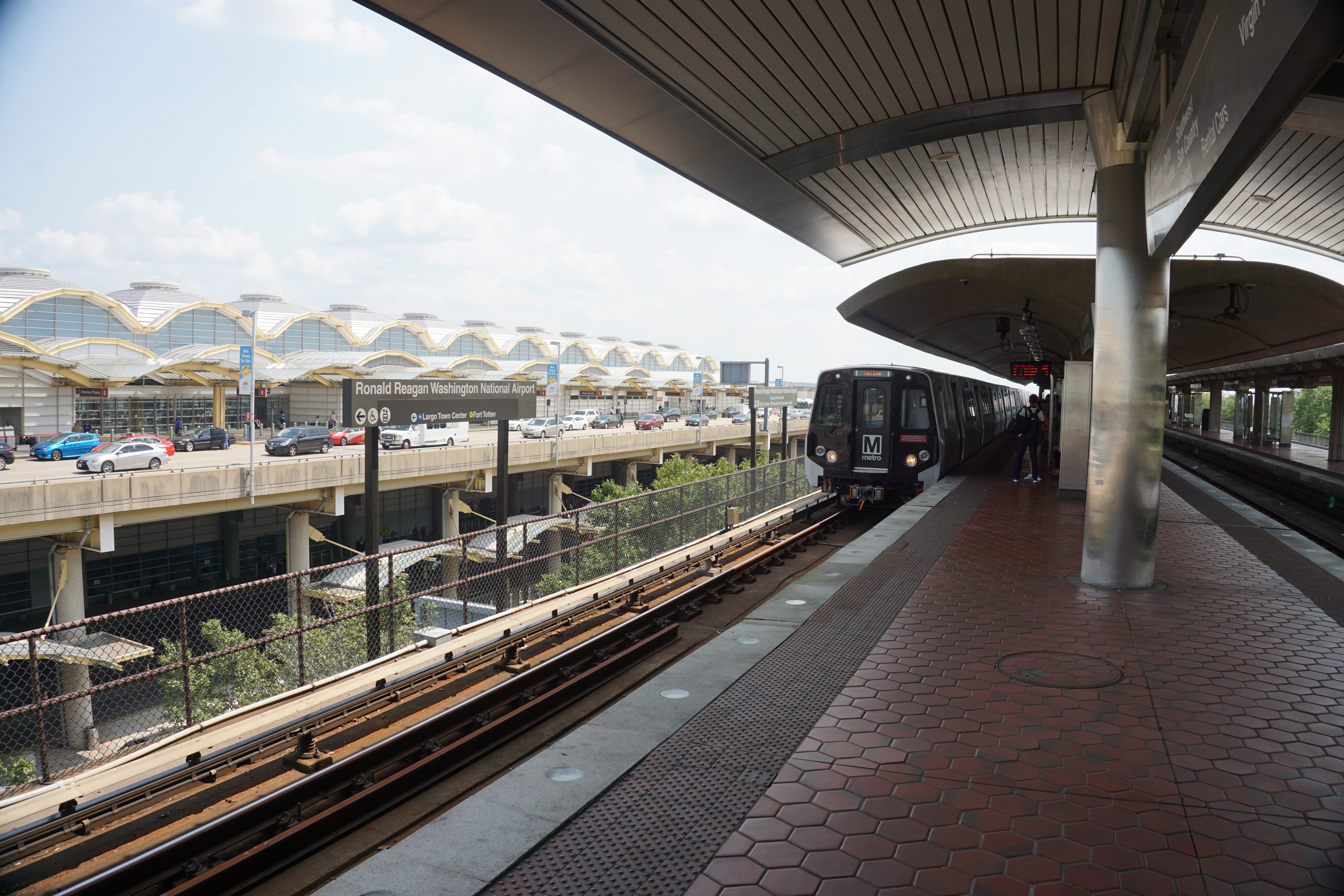
Reagan National station of the Washington Metro connects the airport to the surrounding region via rail.

The Ronald Reagan Washington National Airport station on the Washington Metro, served by the Yellow and Blue lines, is located on an elevated outdoor platform station adjacent to Terminal 2. Two elevated pedestrian walkways connect the station directly to the concourse levels of Terminal 2. An underground pedestrian walkway and shuttle services provide access to Terminal 1.

Ronald Reagan Washington National Airport is located on the George Washington Memorial Parkway, and connected to U.S. Route 1 by the Airport Viaduct (State Route 233). Interstate 395 is just north of the airport, and is also accessible by the G.W. Parkway and U.S. Route 1. Airport-operated parking garage facilities as well as economy lots are available adjacent to or near the various airport terminals.

The airport is accessible by bicycle and foot from the Mount Vernon Trail, as well as the sidewalk along the Airport Viaduct (State Route 233), which connects the airport grounds to U.S. Route 1. A total of 48 bike parking spots are available across six separate bike racks. The airport has a Capital Bikeshare station, making this the first major airport in the United States to have a dock-based bikeshare station.

== Airlines and destinations ==
=== Passenger ===
Airlines	Destinations
Air Canada Express	Montréal–Trudeau, Ottawa, Toronto–Pearson
Alaska Airlines	Los Angeles, Portland (OR), San Diego, San Francisco, Seattle/Tacoma
American Airlines	Boston, Charlotte, Chicago–O'Hare, Dallas/Fort Worth, Fort Lauderdale, Fort Myers, Jacksonville (FL), Las Vegas, Los Angeles, Miami, New Orleans, New York–LaGuardia, Orlando, Phoenix–Sky Harbor, Portland (ME), San Antonio, Sarasota, Tampa, West Palm Beach; Seasonal: Atlanta, Bangor, Burlington (VT), Charleston (SC), Destin/Fort Walton Beach, Hartford, Indianapolis, Kansas City, Nashville, Nassau, Pittsburgh, Providence, Raleigh/Durham, St. Louis, Syracuse
American Eagle	Akron/Canton, Albany (NY), Asheville, Atlanta, Augusta (GA), Bangor, Baton Rouge, Birmingham (AL), Boston, Buffalo, Burlington (VT), Cedar Rapids/Iowa City, Charleston (SC), Charleston (WV), Chattanooga, Chicago–O'Hare, Cincinnati, Cleveland, Columbia (SC), Columbus–Glenn, Dayton, Des Moines, Destin/Fort Walton Beach, Detroit, Fayetteville/Bentonville, Grand Rapids, Greensboro, Greenville/Spartanburg, Hartford, Houston–Intercontinental, Huntsville, Indianapolis, Jackson (MS), Jacksonville (FL), Kansas City, Key West, Knoxville, Lansing, Little Rock, Louisville, Madison, Manchester (NH), Memphis, Milwaukee, Minneapolis/St. Paul, Montgomery, Myrtle Beach, Nashville, New Orleans, New York–JFK, New York–LaGuardia, Norfolk, Oklahoma City, Panama City (FL), Pensacola, Philadelphia, Pittsburgh, Portland (ME), Providence, Raleigh/Durham, Rochester (NY), Savannah, St. Louis, Syracuse, Tallahassee, Toronto–Pearson, Tulsa, White Plains, Wichita, Wilmington (NC); Seasonal: Charlotte, Halifax, Hilton Head, Hyannis, Martha's Vineyard, Nantucket, Nassau, Traverse City
Delta Air Lines	Atlanta, Detroit, Los Angeles, Miami, Minneapolis/St. Paul, Orlando, Salt Lake City, Seattle/Tacoma
Delta Connection	Boston, Cincinnati, Lexington, Madison, Nashville, New York–JFK, New York–LaGuardia, Omaha, Raleigh/Durham
Frontier Airlines	Denver
JetBlue	Boston, Fort Lauderdale, New York–JFK, Orlando, San Juan, West Palm Beach; Seasonal: Martha's Vineyard, Nantucket
Southwest Airlines	Atlanta, Austin, Chicago–Midway, Columbus–Glenn, Dallas–Love, Fort Lauderdale, Houston–Hobby, Kansas City, Las Vegas, Milwaukee, Nashville, New Orleans, Oklahoma City, Omaha, Orlando, Providence, St. Louis, Tampa; Seasonal: Fort Myers, Memphis
United Airlines	Chicago–O'Hare, Denver, Houston–Intercontinental, San Francisco
United Express	Newark

== Statistics ==
=== Top destinations ===
Busiest domestic routes from DCA (September 2025 – August 2026)
Rank	Airport	Passengers	Carriers
1	Boston, Massachusetts	735,411	American, Delta, JetBlue
2	Atlanta, Georgia	672,243	American, Delta, Southwest
3	Chicago–O'Hare, Illinois	652,546	American, United
4	Orlando, Florida	553,658	American, Delta, JetBlue, Southwest
5	Miami, Florida	511,687	American, Delta
6	Dallas/Fort Worth, Texas	462,029	American
7	Nashville, Tennessee	297,851	American, Delta, Southwest
8	Houston–Intercontinental, Texas	283,358	American, United
9	Charlotte, North Carolina	271,605	American
10	Fort Lauderdale, Florida	269,652	American, JetBlue, Southwest

Busiest international routes from DCA (September 2025 – August 2026)
Rank	Airport	Passengers	Carriers
1	Toronto, Canada	221,710	Air Canada, American
2	Montréal, Canada	98,925	Air Canada
3	Nassau, Bahamas	72,979	American
4	Ottawa, Canada	27,964	Air Canada
5	Halifax, Canada	11,732	American

=== Airline market share ===
Largest airlines at DCA (September 2025 – August 2026)
Rank	Airline	Passengers	Market share
1	American Airlines	12,780,693	53.5%
2	Southwest Airlines	3,332,280	14.0%
3	Delta Air Lines	3,288,568	13.8%
4	United Airlines	1,802,325	7.5%
5	JetBlue	1,480,484	6.2%
	other	1,200,000	5.0%

=== Annual traffic ===
Annual passenger traffic at DCA, 1991–present
Year	Passengers	Year	Passengers	Year	Passengers	Year	Passengers
2000	15,888,199	2010	18,118,713	2020	7,574,966	2030	
1999	15,185,348	2009	17,577,359	2019	23,945,527	2029	
1998	15,970,306	2008	18,028,287	2018	23,464,618	2028	
1997	15,907,006	2007	18,679,343	2017	23,903,248	2027	
1996	15,226,500	2006	18,550,785	2016	23,595,006	2026	
1995	15,506,244	2005	17,847,884	2015	23,039,429	2025	24,889,473
1994	15,700,825	2004	15,944,542	2014	20,810,387	2024	26,290,722
1993	16,307,808	2003	14,223,123	2013	20,415,085	2023	25,453,581
1992	15,593,535	2002	12,881,601	2012	19,655,440	2022	23,961,442
1991	15,098,697	2001	13,265,387	2011	18,823,094	2021	14,044,724

== Abingdon plantation historical site ==
A part of the airport is located on the former site of the 18th and 19th century Abingdon plantation, which was associated with the prominent Alexander, Custis, Stuart, and Hunter families. In 1998, MWAA opened a historical display around the restored remnants of two Abingdon buildings and placed artifacts collected from the site in an exhibit hall in Terminal 1. The Abingdon site is located on a knoll between parking Garage 1 and Garage 2 South, near the south end of the Ronald Reagan Washington National Airport Metrorail station.

== Accidents and incidents ==
=== Page Airways ===
On April 27, 1945, a Page Airways Lockheed Model 18 Lodestar on a charter flight crashed into a deep ditch at the end of runway 33 after aborting a takeoff due to engine failure. There were strong gusts and ground turbulence at the time. Out of the 13 passengers and crew on board, six passengers were killed. Although a contemporary newspaper report indicated that the flight's intended destination had been Rochester, New York, the Civil Aeronautics Board's accident investigation report stated that the destination had been New York, N.Y.

=== TWA Flight 955 ===
On March 29, 1946, a TWA Lockheed L-049 Constellation touched down at high speed with the flaps still extending, striking a concrete transformer house after overrunning the end of the runway. All 12 passengers and crew survived, but the aircraft was destroyed and written off.

=== Eastern Air Lines Flight 537 ===
On November 1, 1949, a mid-air collision between an Eastern Air Lines passenger aircraft and a P-38 Lightning military plane killed all 55 people aboard the passenger aircraft. The sole survivor was the Bolivian pilot of the fighter plane, Erick Rios Bridoux.

Bridoux's plane had taken off from National just 10 minutes earlier and was in contact with the tower during a brief test flight. The Eastern Air Lines DC-4 was on approach from the south when the nimble and much faster P-38 banked and plunged right into the passenger plane. Both aircraft fell into the Potomac River.

=== Capital Airlines Flight 500 ===
On December 12, 1949, Capital Airlines Flight 500, a Douglas DC-3, stalled and crashed into the Potomac River while on approach to Washington National. 6 of the 23 passengers and crew on board were killed.

=== Air Florida Flight 90 ===
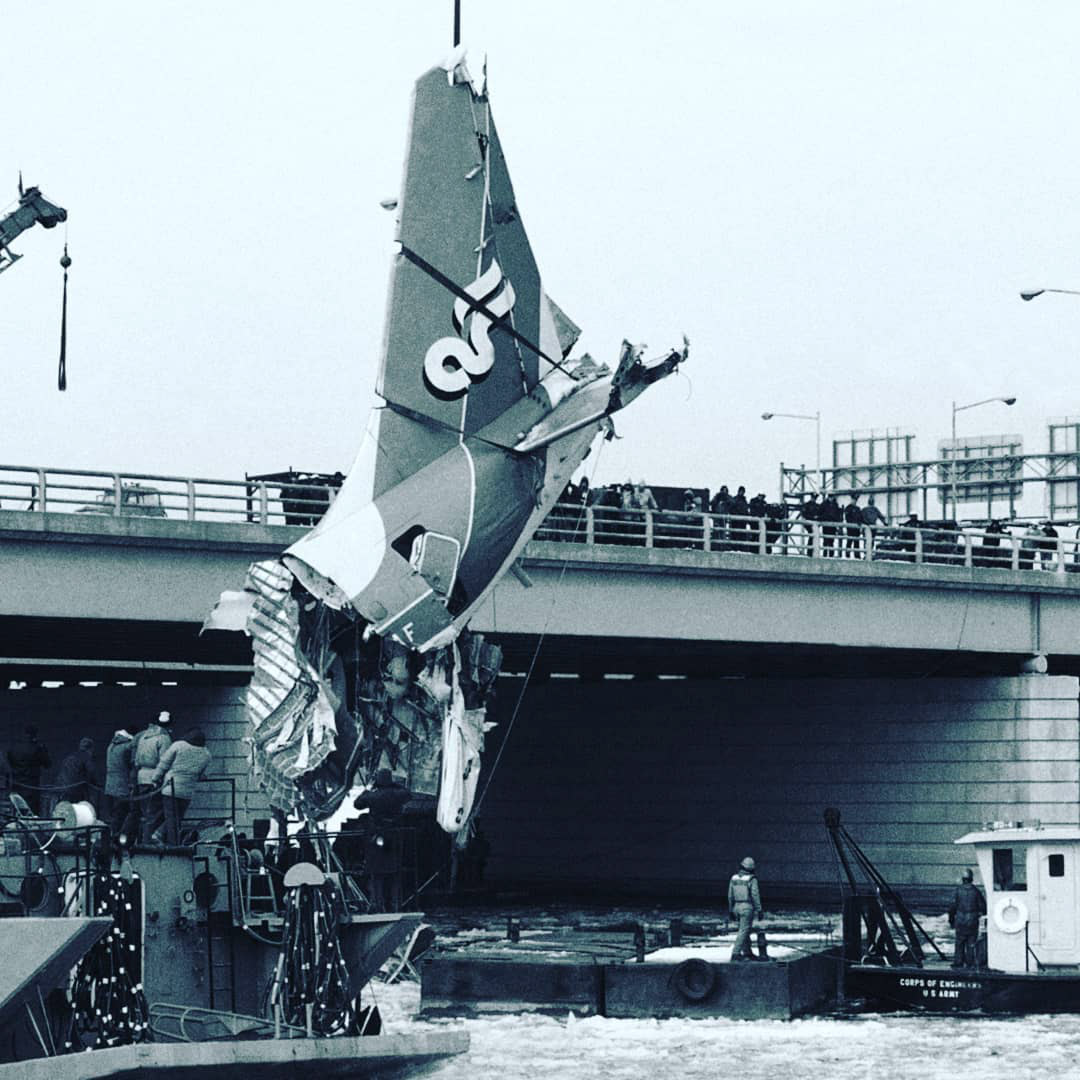
The tail of Air Florida Flight 90 being raised from the Potomac River following its January 13, 1982, crash

On the afternoon of January 13, 1982, following a period of exceptionally cold weather and a morning of blizzard conditions, Air Florida Flight 90 took off after waiting 49 minutes on a taxiway, during which ice and snow built up on the wings. The Boeing 737 aircraft failed to gain altitude, and less than 1 statute mile (1.6 km) from the end of the runway the airplane struck the 14th Street Bridge complex, shearing the tops off vehicles stuck in traffic, before plunging through the 1-inch-thick (25 mm) ice covering the Potomac River. Rescue responses were greatly hampered by the weather and traffic. Due to action on the part of motorists, a United States Park Service police helicopter crew, and one of the plane's passengers who later died, five occupants of the downed plane survived. The other 74 people who were aboard and four occupants of vehicles on the bridge were killed. President Ronald Reagan praised motorist Lenny Skutnik in his State of the Union Address a few weeks later.

=== PSA Flight 5342 ===
Footage from Reagan Airport of the 29 January 2025 collision

On January 29, 2025, PSA Airlines Flight 5342 carrying 64 people collided with a U.S. Army Sikorsky UH-60 Black Hawk helicopter while approaching Ronald Reagan Airport, causing both aircraft to crash into the Potomac River. All 67 passengers and crew on both aircraft were killed (64 on the CRJ700 and three on the Sikorsky UH-60 Black Hawk).

=== 2025 fight in Air Traffic Control tower ===
On March 27, 2025, an on-duty air traffic control supervisor in the DCA tower punched a subordinate in the face during a dispute in the control tower. The altercation forced other controllers to step away from their duties to intervene. Airport police arrested one controller and charged him with assault and battery. A week after the incident, the FAA replaced the tower management team, reassigning the district manager and two assistant managers, whose duties included overseeing operations at DCA, Dulles, and Baltimore/Washington International airports.

=== American Eagle Flights 4522 and 5490 ground collision ===
On April 10, 2025, two American Airlines aircraft collided on the ramp, clipping each other's wingtips. Republic Airways Flight 4522 was departing for John F. Kennedy Airport in New York City, while PSA Airlines Flight 5490 was departing for Charleston, South Carolina. Both airlines are American Airlines subsidiaries which were operating under the American Eagle brand. Several members of Congress were aboard the New York-bound aircraft, including Nick LaLota, Grace Meng, and Josh Gottheimer. The FAA is investigating the cause of the incident.

=== Army Black Hawk flight path incursion ===
On May 1, 2025, two Delta Air Lines aircraft were forced to abort their landings after an Army Black Hawk helicopter crossed the flight path. Delta Air Lines Flight 1671, an Airbus A319 arriving from Orlando, was at an altitude of 700 feet (210 m) when it initiated a go-around. Republic Airways Flight 5825 (branded as Delta Connection), an Embraer E170 arriving from Boston, had 0.4 miles (640 m) separation from the helicopter when it aborted its approach. The Army helicopter, a Sikorsky UH-60 Black Hawk inbound to the Pentagon from Davison Army Airfield in Fairfax, Virginia, belonged to the same brigade as the one involved in the fatal January 29 crash, and was carrying out the same Priority Air Transport mission as the stricken helicopter.

In response to the incident, Secretary of Transportation Sean Duffy accused the Army of unnecessarily taking a "scenic route" near the flight path. An Army official later disputed the accusation, calling the description "inappropriate." According to Duffy, equipment failures exacerbated the issue, as controllers were unable to view the Black Hawk’s position in real-time on their radar. The helicopter's radar track "inadvertently floated and jumped to a different location on the controller feed after being unresponsive for a couple seconds."

The FAA and NTSB are investigating the incident.
