= The Washington Sun (weekly newspaper) =

Defunct American local newspaper

- Type: weekly
- Format: Tabloid
- Language: English
- Headquarters: Washington, D.C.
- Circulation: 55,000

The Washington Sun was a weekly local newspaper based in Washington, D.C. Founded in the mid-1960s, The Washington Sun was purchased by Joseph C. Cooke in 1968. Cooke became both editor and publisher. Under his editorship, the paper sought to put a positive light on local and national developments affecting the African-American community while declining to run cigarette and alcohol advertising. Following his death in 2008, ownership of the paper passed to his family.

== See also ==
- List of newspapers in Washington, D.C.
