= The Washington Diplomat =

American media company

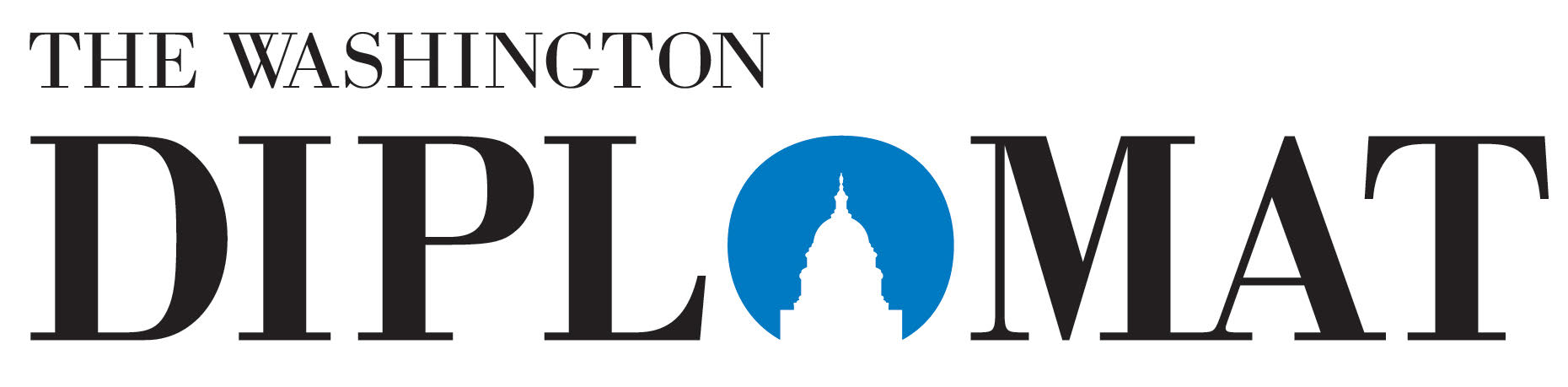
- Type: Media/Events Company
- Publisher: Victor Shiblie
- Managing editor: Anna Gawel
- News editor: Larry Luxner
- Founded: 1994
- Language: English
- Headquarters: Washington, DC
- Circulation: 200,000
- Website: www.washdiplomat.com

The Washington Diplomat is an independent monthly newspaper.

It features one-on-one interviews with foreign ambassadors. It also contains articles examining international relations, politics, trade, U.S. foreign policy, diplomacy, law, media and other current topics.

== See also ==
- List of newspapers in Washington, D.C.
