= Coast Guard Air Station Washington =

United States Coast Guard Air Station in Arlington County, Virginia

- Part of Ronald Reagan Washington National Airport
- Arlington County, Virginia in the United States
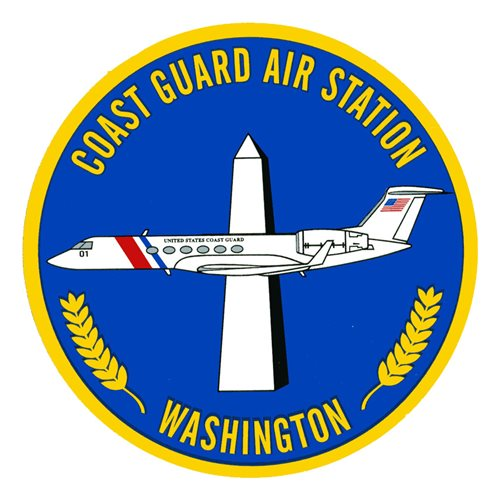

Site information
- Owner: United States Department of Transportation
- Operator: Metropolitan Washington Airports Authority/ United States Coast Guard
- Controlled by: Coast Guard District 5, Sector Maryland-National Capital Region
- Open to the public: No
- Website: www.uscg.mil/airstaDC/

Site history
- Built: February 20, 1952
- In use: 1952–present

Coast Guard Air Station Washington (CGAS Washington) is a United States Coast Guard Air Station in Arlington County, Virginia. Located at Ronald Reagan Washington National Airport adjacent to the Crystal City neighborhood of Arlington, the air station supports NORAD air defense missions in and around the Washington, D.C. metropolitan area and its Special Flight Rules Area, provides executive transportation for the Commandant of the Coast Guard and Secretary of Homeland Security, and carries out regional Continuity of Government tasking as directed.

Operated by rotating staff drawn from a pool of 60 aviators and 175 enlisted members permanently assigned to Coast Guard Air Station Atlantic City, New Jersey, the flight crews of CGAS Washington operate Eurocopter MH-65D Dolphin helicopters and Gulfstream C-37B business jets. The air station is located across the Potomac River from Coast Guard Station Washington located on Joint Base Anacostia-Bolling.

== History ==
=== 20th century ===
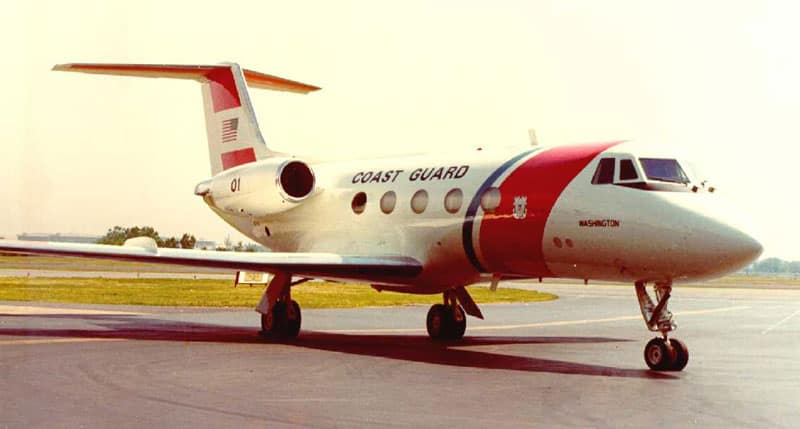
The former VC-11A 01 with CGAS Washington ID on the nose

The station was established as Air Detachment Arlington in 1952. It operated Martin 4-0-4s, a VC-4A (Grumman Gulfstream I), and a VC-11A, (Gulfstream II) aircraft. In 1964 the unit was redesignated Coast Guard Air Station Arlington and 10 years later, in 1974, Air Station Arlington changed its name to Air Station Washington in recognition of its location at Washington National Airport.

In a USCG Headquarters Memo, dated December 20, 1973, the use of the VC-4A and the VC-11A was defined as follows: “These aircraft are used to provide air transportation on a demand basis, to the Secretary [of Transportation] and members of his staff, the Commandant, U.S. Coast Guard and members of his staff and such other personnel as may be authorized by the Commandant. The VC-4A is normally used for all flights east of the Mississippi and the VC-11A is normally used only for flights west of the Mississippi or outside CONUS.”

In 1994, Air Station Washington began single aircraft operation and accepted a C-20B Gulfstream III (cn 477) from the Air Force to replace the aging VC-4A and VC11A. The C-20B's range advantage brought the capability to operate as a Long Range Command and Control Aircraft (LRCCA). On May 11, 2002, Air Station Washington accepted a C-37A Gulfstream V aircraft as its sole aircraft.

=== 21st century ===
In 2005, operations with two aircraft resumed as the Coast Guard leased a Bombardier Challenger 604, designated as C-143, to operate as a Medium Range Command and Control Aircraft (MRCCA). As the lease for the Challenger 604 came to close in October 2011, a second Gulfstream V (C-37A) was leased and designated as CG02. The Gulfstream platform provides well-established type certifications and qualifications consistent across the Department of Defense executive fleet with 18 Gulfstream GV derivative aircraft in service.

As of 2022, the Coast Guard took delivery of a new Gulfstream C-37B aircraft, replacing a formerly leased Gulfstream 550, and now owns its entire LRCCA fleet, equipped with commercial and military communications systems, providing secure voice and data capabilities, as well as specialized equipment and sensors to meet Coast Guard mission needs. The C-37B, designated as CG-102, is expected to have a service life of at least 30 years, and joins the existing owned C-37A (CG-101, cn 653) acquired in 2002.

== Operations ==
=== Rotary Wing Air Intercept mission ===
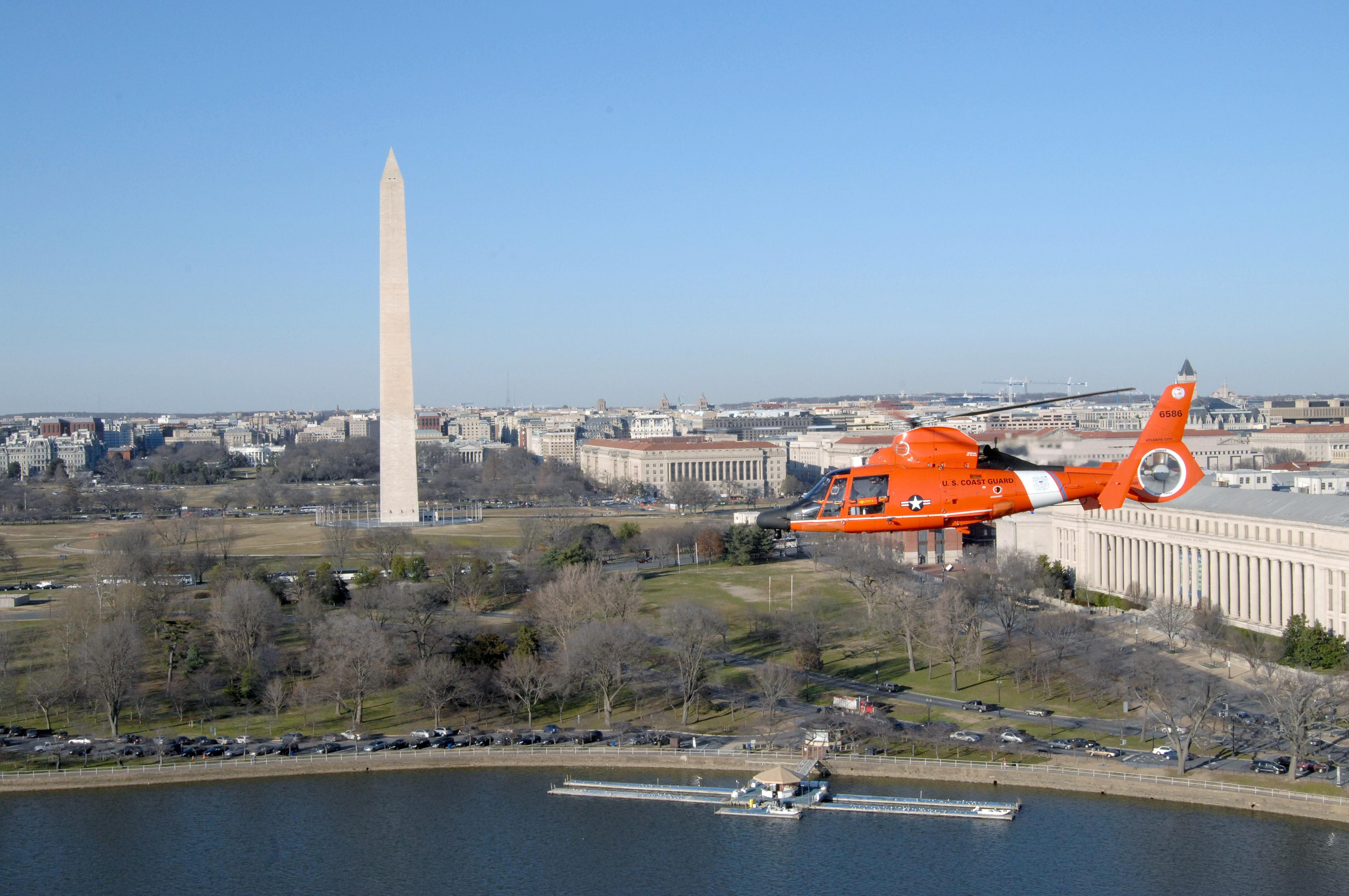
A MH-65D flying over the National Mall and the Potomac River

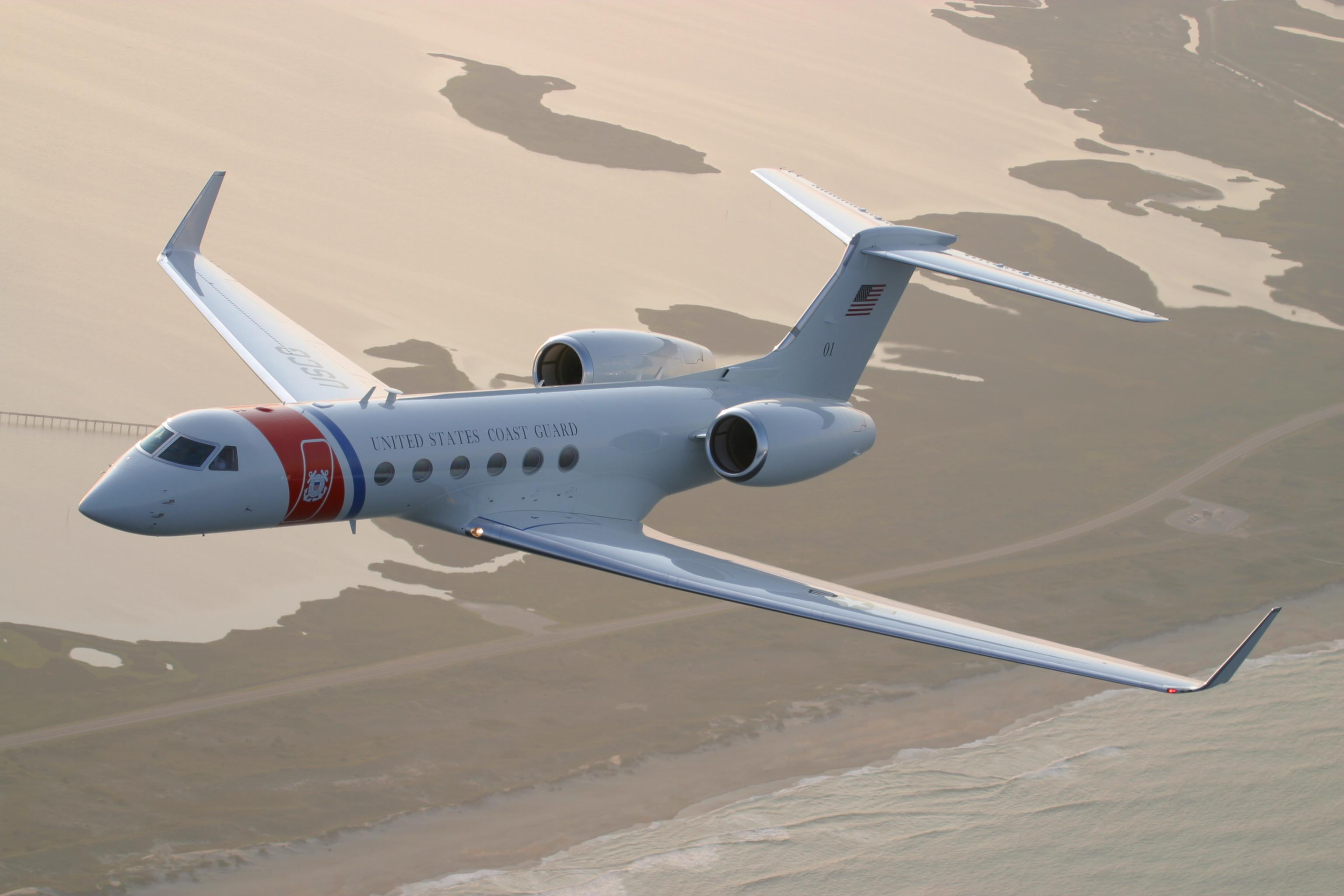
One of CGAS Washington's two C-37s in flight.

Since taking over the role from United States Customs and Border Protection September 25, 2006, Coast Guard personnel from CGAS Atlantic City, New Jersey, have been rotating into the National Capital Region Air Defense Facility (NCRADF) at CGAS Washington to perform the Rotary Wing Air Intercept mission to visually identify low flying, slow-moving targets that have entered into restricted airspace. Under the operational control of NORAD as part of Operation Noble Eagle, aircrews defend the 30-nautical-mile (56 km) air defense identification zone around the capital known as the Washington, D.C. special flight rules area. The MH-65E Dolphin helicopters used have a digital signboard to transmit instructions to errant pilots, and are armed with M240 machine guns and anti-material rifles on board.

=== Executive transportation ===
As of 2020, the air station has two Gulfstream C-37 aircraft assigned. The C-37, derived of the popular Gulfstream G550 platform, provides the Commandant, the Secretary of Homeland Security, and other required-use passengers with nonstop intercontinental transportation capabilities while maintaining long range command and control functionality. An array of communications equipment permits the Commandant to command from the aircraft as efficiently as from headquarters.

== Aircraft assigned ==
- United States Coast Guard
  - Gulfstream C-37B
  - Eurocopter MH-65E Dolphin
