= Voice of the Hill =

Capitol Hill local print newspaper

- Type: Monthly
- Format: Print and web newspaper
- Owner: The Current Newspapers
- Founder(s): Bruce and Adele Robey and Stephanie Cavanaugh
- Founded: 1999
- Ceased publication: 5 May 2010
- City: Washington DC
- Country: United States

Voice of the Hill was an American local print newspaper that covered the Capitol Hill neighborhood in Washington DC. It was founded by Bruce and Adele Robey and Stephanie Cavanaugh and was owned by The Current Newspapers. Voice of the Hill was then the only newspaper that had a web presence. On 5 May 2010, it was announced that Voice of the Hill would cease publication due to a decline in advertising revenue. This was a few months after Bruce Robey's death.
