= Farmers National Weekly =

American English-language newspaper

Farmers National Weekly was an English-language Communist farm newspaper published in the United States. It was published by either the Farmers' National Education Association or the Farmers National Committee for Action (a Communist organization) in 1933 in Washington, D.C., and from 1934 to 1936 in Chicago.
