= Express (Washington, D.C., newspaper) =

- Express in a newspaper rack in Rockville, Maryland, on May 11, 2018
- Type: Free weekday newspaper
- Format: Tabloid
- Owner(s): Nash Holdings, LLC; Jeff Bezos
- Founder: Christopher Ma
- Editor-in-chief: Dan Caccavaro
- Associate editor: Serena Golden
- Managing editor: Jeffrey Tomik; Rudi Greenberg
- News editor: Zainab Mudallal; Sean Gossard; Rachel Podnar; Briana Ellison
- Founded: August 4, 2003; 22 years ago
- Headquarters: Washington, D.C., U.S.
- Circulation: 180,000 daily
- Sister newspapers: The Washington Post
- ISSN: 1947-2099
- Website: readexpress.com

Logo in 2011

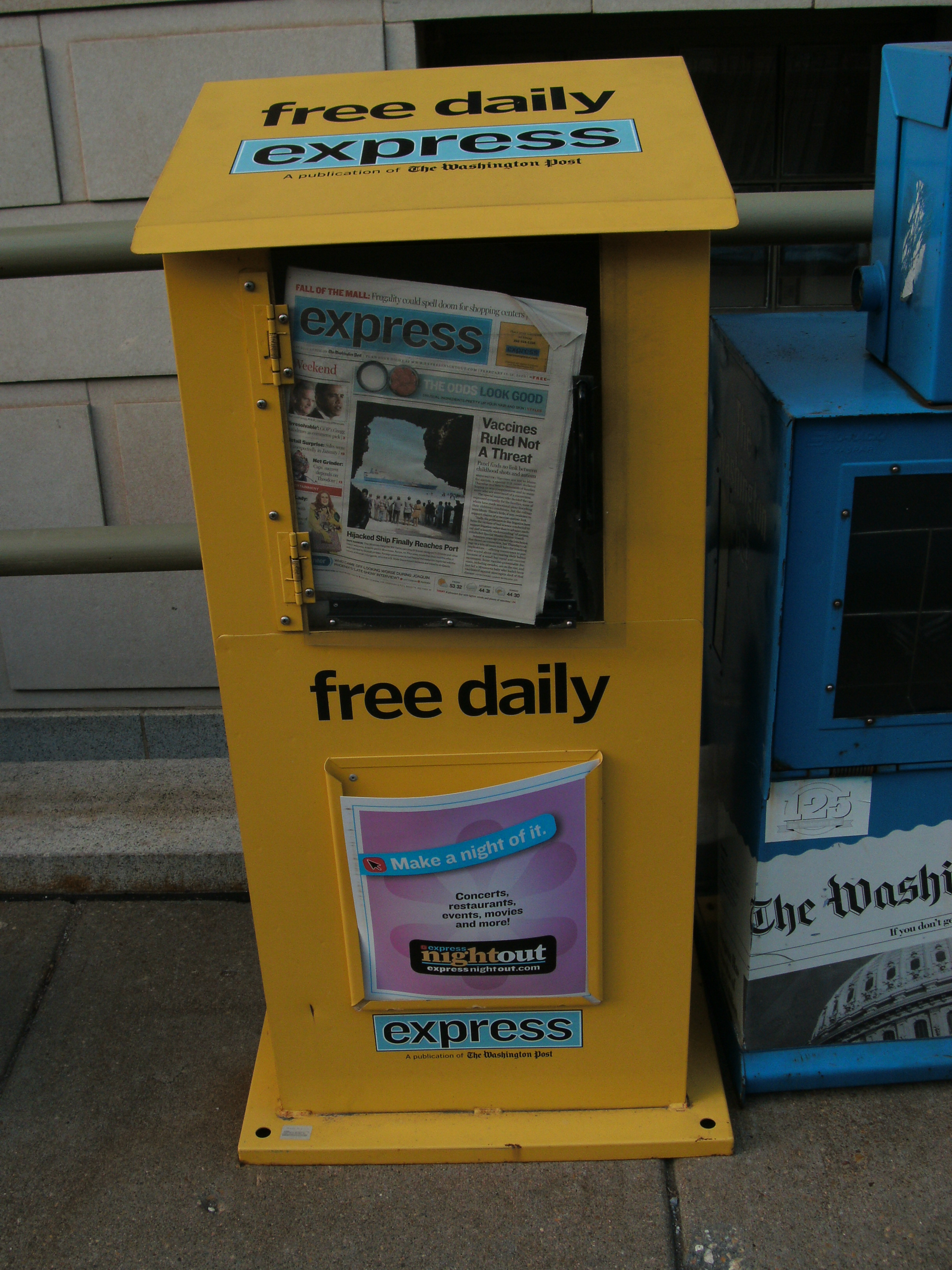
Express box

The Express was a free daily newspaper, distributed in the Washington metropolitan area. It was a publication of The Washington Post. As of 2017, it had the second-highest circulation in the District of Columbia after The Washington Post, and was read by 239,500 people every day. The final issue was published on September 12, 2019.

== History and operations ==
The Express was published every weekday in a tabloid format since it started publication on August 4, 2003. It was distributed by hawkers at Washington Metro stations and in newspaper racks at other locations throughout the Washington metropolitan area.

It was owned and printed by the Washington Post Company, owner of The Washington Post. As of 2012, it had a daily print circulation of 180,000. Express was published by Express Publications Company, LLC, a wholly owned subsidiary of the Washington Post Company.

Express was written and edited from the Washington Post's office on Franklin Square in Washington, D.C. Prior to 2010, it was produced from an office in Arlington, Virginia. Printing the newspaper required over 700 tons of newsprint annually.

Express was written and edited by a staff of 23, up from 13 in 2003.

The Post announced that its final edition of Express would be dated September 12, 2019.

=== Content ===
Although it had the same owner as The Washington Post, few of the hard-news stories were written by Post staff. Express published content from syndicates and wire services—particularly the Associated Press and Getty Images. In general, Express' content tended to be lighter than the Post's—it included sections like "People" (celebrity gossip), "Trending" (social media and Internet culture), and "page three" and "eyeopeners" (highlighting uplifting or humorous stories)—and tended to emphasize local and sports news more than the Post.

Express included a special section, which was different each weekday. These sections were:

- Screens (Monday), a TV and movies section.
- Fit (Tuesday), a health and fitness section, which also includes an advice column, "Baggage Check," written by licensed clinical psychologist Dr. Andrea Bonior.
- Federal Workforce (Wednesday), a page with articles about issues relevant to civilian federal government employees. Also typically includes a promotion for the Post's Can he do that? podcast, which covers the Trump presidency.
- Weekend Pass (Thursday), an extended entertainment section with a detailed guide to the weekend's upcoming shows, concerts, museum exhibits, and the like. It was by far the largest of the special sections.
- Movies (Friday), a section with reviews of new movies and trailers and some Hollywood news.
- Apartment Showcase (Friday), a listing of featured apartments in the Washington metro area. Apartment Showcase is also published as a weekly independent publication. Like Express, it is owned by the Washington Post.

Express also ran some special advertising sections—such as the Guide to the Lively Arts and the Religious Services Directory—as well as the following special monthly sections:

- Ahead (Second Monday of each month), on career planning and postgraduate and continuing education.
- Condo Living (Fourth Wednesday of each month), like Apartment Showcase, but specializing in condos.
- Free + Easy (First Thursday of each month), a feature on free events and activities in the Washington area.

Express' original stories were available on the washingtonpost.com website. The newspaper was financed solely by advertising.

The newspaper did not have an opinion section or letters to the editor, unlike other newspapers in the local market such as Politico, The Washington Examiner, The Washington Post, and The Washington Times.

In January 2017, Express caused some controversy on the Internet when its cover story on the 2017 Women's March used the male gender symbol instead of the female one. Express apologized for the mistake after its cover went viral, and published an image of the cover with the correct female symbol, which they said they had intended to run.

In June 2018, Express brought back its DC Rider column, which included features about the Washington Metro and answers reader questions about the Metro transit system. The column was written by Kery Murakami.

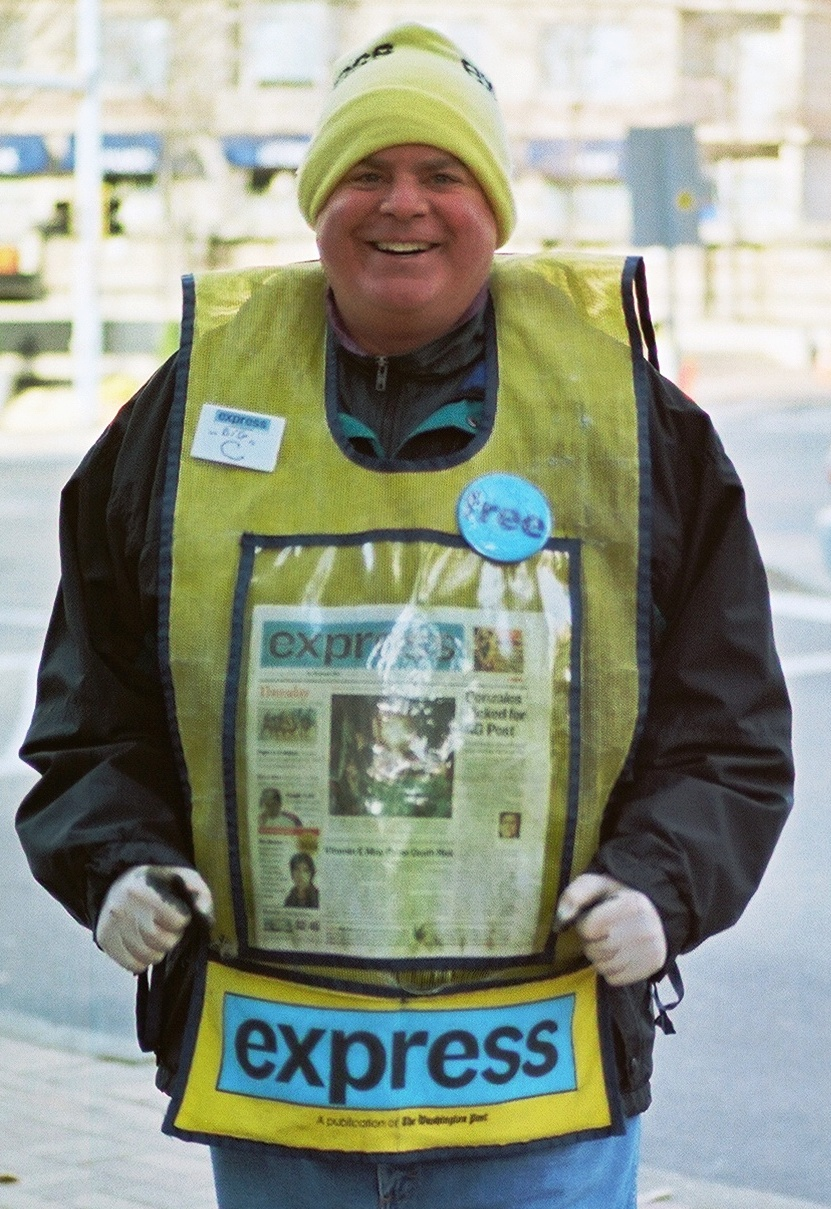
Express distributor wearing an Express vest.

=== Layout and mobile applications ===
The newspaper launched a redesign on November 30, 2009, which emphasized a more magazine-style front page, along with a daily cover story. On August 4, 2014, it launched another redesign meant to engage readers more with the paper version rather than on a phone. The paper doubled in size since its launch, from 24–28 pages in 2003 to 48–60 pages in 2012.

The Express staff also produced a website, ExpressNightOut.com, that featured local entertainment and lifestyle coverage.

Content from Express was also published on Washington Post Social Reader, a Facebook-linked website that aggregated content from the various publications owned by the Washington Post Company and partner organizations: The Washington Post, Foreign Policy, The Root, Express, Slate, and 90 others.

In August 2010, the newspaper launched a mobile application, DC Rider, which is available for iOS (iPhone and iPod Touch) and Android devices. The ad-supported app provides status updates for the Washington Metro.

== See also ==
- List of newspapers in Washington, D.C.
- List of free daily newspapers
