= The Current Newspapers =

Four weekly community newspapers in Washington, D.C., United States

- Type: Weekly newspaper
- Format: Tabloid
- Owner: Davis Kennedy
- Publisher: David Ferrara
- Editor: Kate Michael
- Founded: 1967
- Ceased publication: 2019
- Headquarters: 5185 MacArthur Blvd. NW, Suite 102, Washington, D.C., United States
- Circulation: 48,200 Weekly
- Website: currentnewspapers.com
- Free online archives: http://209.160.1.24/archive.php

The Current Newspapers consisted of four print and online weekly community newspapers in Washington, D.C., with editions targeted to affluent communities in Georgetown, Dupont Circle, Foggy Bottom, and Northwest DC.

The publications group provided readers with the latest news from the District of Columbia government, local government including Advisory Neighborhood Commissions (ANC), citizens organizations, and other community news, sports, events, and entertainment for areas served since 1967.

The company previously owned a newspaper on Capitol Hill – Voice of the Hill – but ceased publication on May 5, 2010, citing declines in advertising revenue. This announcement came around 9 months after the death of the paper's co-founder, Bruce Robey, who was found dead due to an apparent heart attack in September, 2009. The company ceased all publications on May 10, 2019.

== History ==
=== Northwest Current ===
The first issue of the Northwest Current was released on October 20, 1977, succeeding the Potomac Current, which ran biweekly from 1968–1977.

=== Georgetown Current ===
The Georgetown Current began publication in 1991, and covers news concerning the communities of Burleith, Foxhall, Georgetown, Glover Park, and the lower Palisades.

=== Financial issues and closure ===
On September 8, 2017, one of The Current's former printers, Gannett Company, filed a lawsuit against The Current through the DC Superior Court for $180,000 worth of unpaid printing bills.

In early January 2018, The Current filed for bankruptcy, having owed its creditors more than $1.25 million, with the free newspaper not having the money to pay its workers, distributors, or printers. The Current filed a petition for Chapter 11 protection on January 3 through the U.S. Bankruptcy Court for the District of Columbia, in which it reported less than $50,000 in assets and over $1.2 million in liabilities. Many of these liabilities come from former printers such as the previously mentioned Gannett Company, to which it owed over $180,000, Bartash Printing Inc for $105,000, APG of Chesapeake for $60,000, and former writers and photographers who are owed around $26,000.

On May 10, 2019, The Current Newspapers' editorial director, Kate Michael, emailed employees that The Current would stop publishing immediately. The email said, "I'm sorry for the abrupt shock of this message. It is a difficult one for me send. I wish I had more specific information to share with you, but I was just told this afternoon that due to a Bankruptcy filing change from the former Publisher, The Current will cease editorial operations. I am not sure if we will be able to resume in the future under any circumstances, but will be in touch with you should that be possible."

== Coverage ==
=== Sections ===
==== ANC News ====
"ANC" stands for Advisory Neighborhood Commissions, and each version of The Current covered its own neighborhood's news in this section.

==== District Digest ====
This section covered D.C. news that would be relevant to readers of all four versions of The Current, providing more broad, city-wide news in contrast to the community news provided by the ANC News section.

==== School Dispatch ====
In this section, students at local (usually independent) schools submitted their own articles that were featured in the paper. (Many of these schools are part of AISGW)

==== Marketplace ====
The Current almost always covered local real estate, with special reports on unique and lavish houses on the market appearing weekly. Additionally, the local newspaper reviewed cars and discussed up and coming shops and restaurants gaining a buzz in the community.

==== Sports ====
Most, but not all, issues of The Current covered local sports, including news on recently traded players, local athletes signing to professional or collegiate teams, the scores of local high school sports games, and other local-infused sports news. Brian Kapur served as a long-time Sports reporter, editor, and photographer at the paper.

==== Events ====
Each issue of The Current typically ended with a list of events occurring throughout the city in the coming week, providing readers with possible activities to participate in around town.

==== Miscellaneous ====
In addition to the aforementioned sections, The Current published Letters to the Editor, Police Reports, Staff Editorials, and a section called "Pet of the Week", which covered rescue animals that are up for adoption.

=== Notable stories ===
One of The Current's most notable stories was its coverage of World War I-era chemicals buried in Spring Valley: a neighborhood bordering American University in Northwest DC. Unbeknownst to the affluent neighborhood's residents, the area was used as a testing ground for munitions and lethal chemicals in 1918, and the chemical residue seemed to be the causes of the unexplainable illnesses residents were suffering some 80 years later. While the chemicals appeared to be the obvious cause of the illness to the residents, the multiple surveys conducted on the neighborhood found inconclusive results.

It was amidst this debate in 2004 that Northwest Current staff writer Charles Bermpohl conducted his 345-house survey of the neighborhood, where he 160 cases of potentially lethal, chronic, and rare diseases. The survey came as part of a special edition of The Current published November 10, 2004, and was completely devoted to Spring Valley's risk from World War I poisons. One section from this issue was titled, "A Bush autoimmune link to area?" and discussed how former President George H.W. Bush and his wife Barbara both suffered from Grave's Disease and lived a few blocks from Spring Valley, where they could have been exposed to the toxic soil. This story went on to win a National Newspaper Association award for environmental reporting, making it one of The Current's most notable stories.

== Awards ==
Year	Article	Author	Award	Organization	Notes
2004	"A Bush autoimmune link to area?"	Charles Bermpohl	Environmental Reporting Award	National Newspaper Association	

== See also ==
- Camp Leach
- Spring Valley (Washington, D.C.)
- Superior Court of the District of Columbia
- Community Newspapers
