= Richard W. Thompson (journalist) =

American journalist and public servant

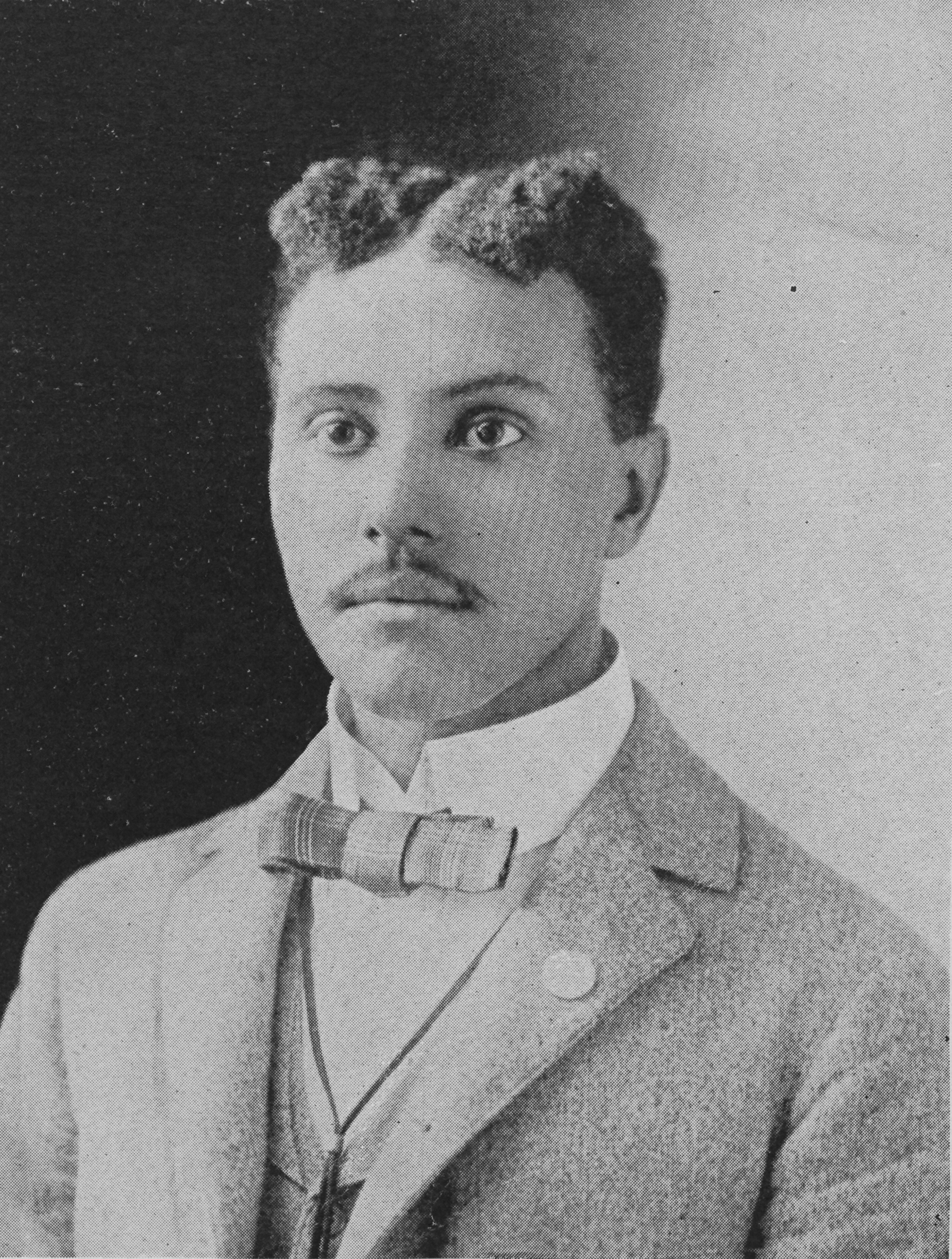
- Thompson c. 1902
- Born: 1865; Brandenburg, Kentucky, U.S.
- Died: February 12, 1920 (aged 54–55); Washington, D.C., U.S.
- Occupations: Journalist, Clerk
- Spouses: Grace Evelyn Lucas; Ella B Gibbs

Richard W. Thompson (1865 - February 12, 1920) was a journalist and public servant in Indiana and Washington, D.C. He was at various times an editor or managing editor of the Indianapolis Leader, the Indianapolis World, the Indianapolis Freeman and the Washington D.C. Colored American. He was published as a general correspondent in The Colored American, The Washington Post, the Indianapolis Freeman, the Indianapolis World, Atlanta Age, Baltimore Afro-American Ledger, the Cincinnati Rostrum, the Charleston West Virginia Advocate, the Philadelphia Tribune and the Chicago Monitor. His longest-lasting relationship was with the Indianapolis Freeman. In 1896, the black paper, The Leavenworth Herald, edited by Blanche Ketene Bruce, called Thompson the "best newspaper correspondent on the colored press."

He was closely associated with Booker T. Washington and twice served as an assistant of Emmett Jay Scott, in 1903 when Scott was Washington's assistant at the Tuskegee Institute and again in 1918 when Scott was special assistant to the Secretary of War during World War I. He played an important role in the support of Washington against the attacks against Washington by William H. Ferris in 1903. He also had a long-running antagonism with William Calvin Chase of the Washington Bee.

== Life ==
Richard W. Thompson was born in 1865 in Brandenburg, Meade County, Kentucky. His father was a minister of the African Methodist Episcopal Zion Connection Church, and died in 1872. later that year he moved with his mother, Jane, to New Albany, Indiana. In 1875, he moved to Indianapolis where he attended public schools. His performance in school was excellent, but he was forced to leave school before the end of his senior year due to ill health.

His mother was born in Jefferson County, Kentucky and died of pleurisy 25 February 1900 aged 53. She was survived by her mother, Richard's grandmother. Jane Thompson played a leading role in the community of Indianapolis's Jones Tabernacle A. M. E. Zion church.

Thompson had two wives, Grace Evelyn Lucas and Ella B Gibbs, both of whom taught together in Indianapolis Public Schools. He first married teacher Ella B Gibbs, daughter of Eliza Gibbs, on April 5, 1888. They had one daughter, Vivian Lucille Thompson (b 1893). Another child, Bertram Ferroe Thompson died in 1890 at the age of 18 months. Ella B. Thompson died in the morning of May 29, 1900 after two months illness aged 33. The funeral was at Metropolitan A.M.E. Church.

Even before Ella died, Richard had a relationship with Grace Lucas. In 1892, Lucas was accused in a letter to the Indianapolis Freeman of being a poor teacher and of having an affair with Thompson. After Ella's death, Thompson married Lucas on November 12, 1901, in Jersey City, NJ. Bishop Alexander Walters, a friend of Thompson's, presided. Under the name Grace Lucas Thompson, she occasionally published articles in the Indianapolis Freeman and other newspapers. The pair lived in Washington DC for much of the rest of their lives, and Grace taught public schools in there.

Vivian Lucille Thomas married Walter Scott Turner August 6, 1917. At the time of his death, Thompson was involved in a dispute with assistant superintendent of DC Schools, Roscoe C. Bruce, related with Bruce's alleged opposition to Vivian's appointment as teacher in spite of her passing her examination and being, by those rights, first in line for a position.

In February 1920, Thompson was confined to his home after suffering a nervous breakdown. Thompson died on Friday night, February 12, following an operation at Freedman's Hospital. His funeral was at St. Luke's church, pallbearers were intimate friends of his: Robert Heberton Terrell, John C. Dancy, Walter Singleton, John T. Howe, J. A. Lankford, and J. Finley Wilson.

== Early career in Indiana ==
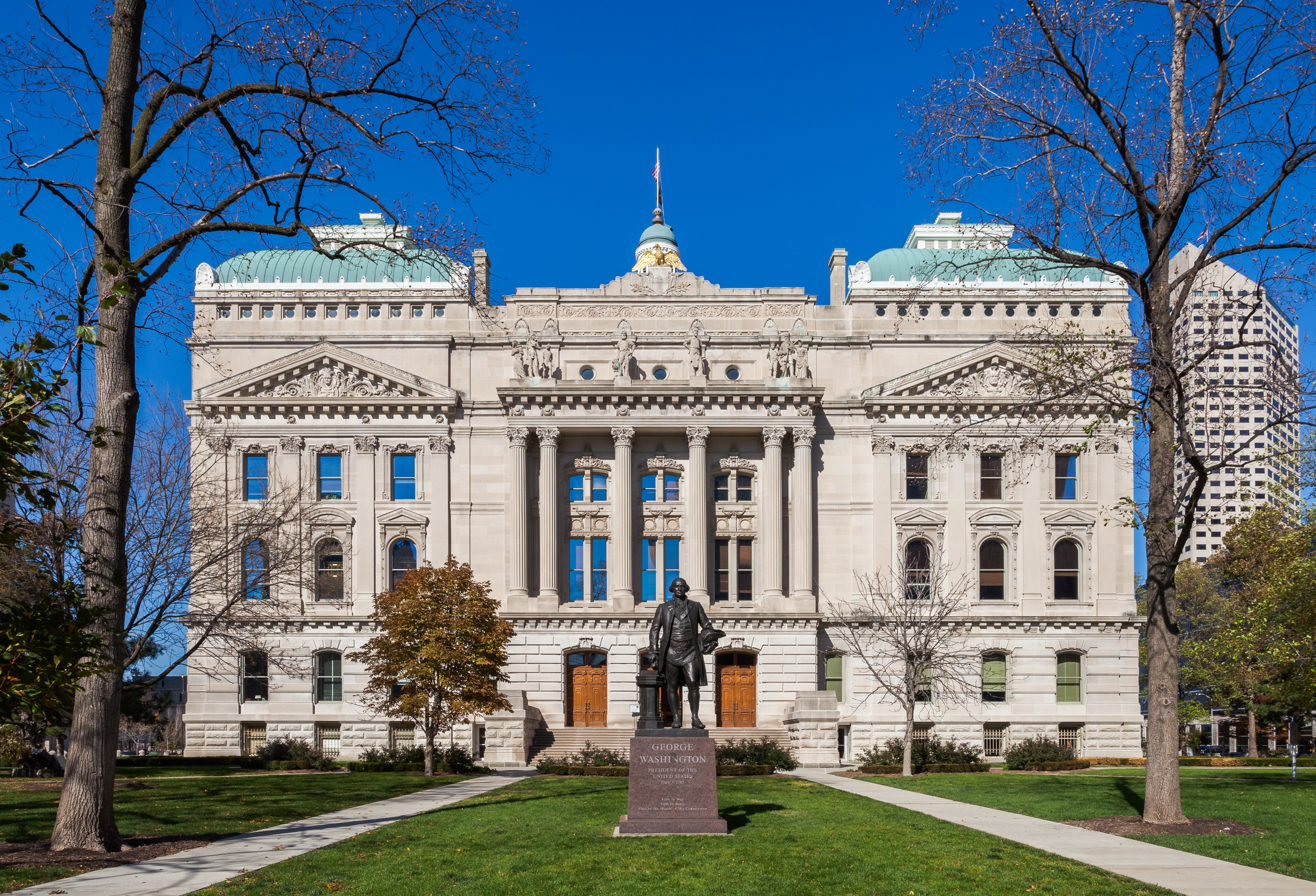
Indiana State House, built in 1888

In 1879 Thompson joined with brothers Benjamin, Robert, and James Bagby writing for their paper, the Indianapolis Leader, which was the first black newspaper in Indianapolis. At that time, in connection with his school duties, he kept books for Dr. F. W. Ferree, secretary of the Marion County Board of Health. His work was recognized and he was appointed by speaker to the Indiana State Legislature as a page during the 1880–1881 session. His nomination received the support of many legislators at the time, including Benjamin Harrison, S. Hinton, and J. T. V. Hill.

In 1882, he became city editor of the Indianapolis Leader. He then moved to the Indianapolis Freeman, where he was made an editor, and the Indianapolis World. The Indianapolis World was launched by Edward Elder Cooper, Edwin E. Horn, and Levi E. Christy with Thompson in charge of the city department. At different times he worked for that paper as compositor, foreman of the mechanical department, and managing editor.

In 1886, he turned 21 and registered as a Democrat to vote for Grover Cleveland. In 1887 he was employed as a deputy in the office of auditor of Marion County, Indiana under Thomas Taggart. He came first in a civil service exam ahead of 75 whites in 1888 and on August 1 was appointed a letter carrier in the Indianapolis Post Office by Postmaster Aquillo Jones, where he served until July 1893. That year he became managing editor of the Indianapolis Freeman and the Indianapolis World.

== Move to D.C. ==
Thompson's interest in class included a discussion of the Emancipation Day festivities in 1893, which Thompson covered for the Freeman for a number of years. The celebrations were increasingly of little interest to Washington Elites. Thompson saw the change in the nature of the festivities not so much related to the aging and deaths of so many blacks born into slavery and replacement by people who were born after, but instead as due to the evolution of black social structure, saying that Frederick Douglass, Blanche Bruce, and James D. Lynch were "as far away from the colored people at the other end of the social scale as the most exclusive white society man thinks himself to be from the most humble white laborer." and that leading blacks in Washington saw the celebration in the same way as leading white citizens did.

In July 1894 he moved to Washington D.C., having been appointed by Thomas E Benedict as a compositor in the Government Printing Office. In September of that year he was promoted to chief clerkship of the counting division, which position he held in July 1895 but had left by 1899. He was the first black clerk and time-keeper ever appointed in the department. While continuing to write for papers, his duties in the federal office was to record all public documents, reports, etc. issued from government presses. During a reorganization of the division, he inaugurated the system of bookkeeping used their for some time with the approval of Benedict.

He left the printing office in D.C. to clerk in the office of recorder of deeds, working closely with Henry Plummer Cheatham. In D.C., he also became heavily involved in the intellectual scene of the city. While living in the capital, his work was frequently published outside of D.C. and he published in the Indianapolis Freeman throughout his life. In 1895, he analyzed the Washington, D.C. elite in a series of articles called "Phases of Washington Life" for the Indianapolis Freeman. In 1896, Will Milton Lewise invited Thompson to again address class lines among blacks for the Freeman. Thompson emphasized that class lines were based on authentic characteristics such as character, worth, morals, and conduct, and not on the color of skin, texture of hair, or money. Throughout his life, Thompson became very close with many Washington elites, including Henrietta Vinton Davis, James E. Slaughter, W. Bishop Johnson, T. Thomas Fortune, Paul Bray, Lester Walton, James H. Anderson, William O. Minard, N. B. Dodson, George W. Harris, and R. E. S. Toomey.

=== Social involvement ===
In 1899, he was recording secretary of the National Afro-American Council and an officer in several of the black literary lyceums. In 1900 he was elected president of D.C.'s Second Baptist Lyceum, one of a number of black D.C. clubs which heard talks from intellectuals and artists and debated issues of the day. Other officers elected in 1900 included R.S. Smith and C.L. Marshall as first and second vice-president, Emma E. Tolliver, Almira Cautchfield, and Birdie Miller as recording, financial, and responding secretaries, Evelyn Cary as Treasurer, and T. H. Norman, Benjamin Washington, Lillian V. Green, B. T. Holme, and Thomas Ware. He was elected to his third term as president of the Second Baptist Lyceum in July 1901. In 1902 was a co-founder of the Sparta Club located on 340 Pennsylvania Ave along with Edward E. Cooper, Richard E. Seldon, and others, and he was in the Pen and Pencil Club. He was elected corresponding secretary of the Mu-So-Lit club in 1913.

== Relationship with Booker T. Washington ==
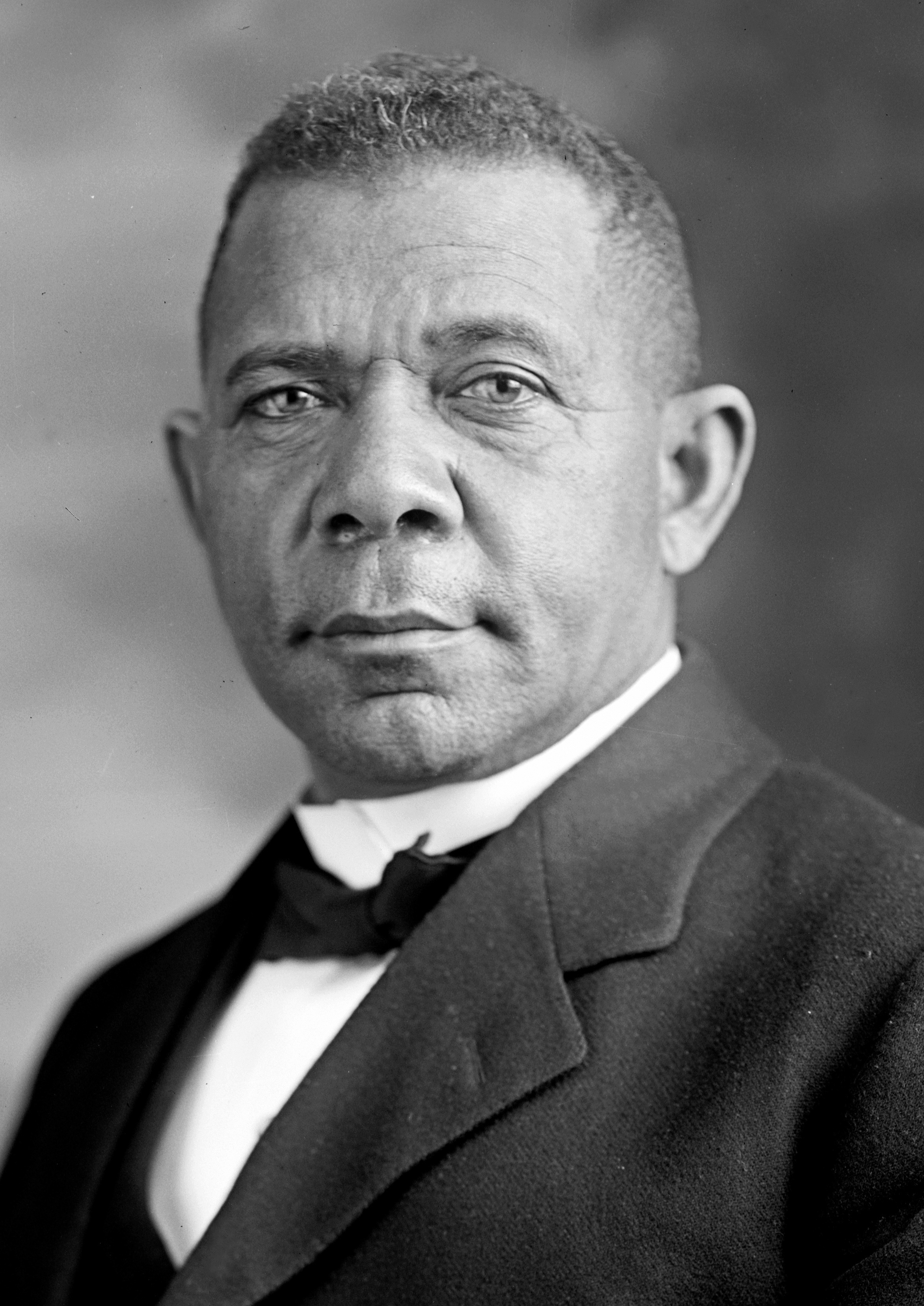
Booker T. Washington, 1905

By 1899, Thompson was managing editor of the Colored American, and in the early 1900s he ran what was called the Negro Press Bureau, a syndicated news service to about a dozen black newspapers which Booker T. Washington secretly subsidized and which was one of his prime agencies for influencing black editors. He also owed some of his position in the federal government to his connection to Washington. In the census bureau in January 1900, Thompson was assigned to the Division of Manufactures under Edward W. Parker, who was a special agent to the division and also the Director of the United States Geological Survey and a friend to Booker T. Washington. Thompson's wife had a place in the Government Printing Office. In early 1900 he wrote Washington that his federal salary ($50 per month for himself, $40 per month for his wife) was inadequate, and although he hoped for a promotion and raise soon, he did not wish to continue on as managing editor of the Colored American, instead to write letters, articles, etc., for multiple papers. This would give him more latitude and pay, and he planned to continue to write features for the Colored American.

=== Dispute with William H. Ferris in 1903 ===
The Colored American front page November 25, 1899

In 1903, Thompson was receiving $12 per month from Washington or the Tuskegee Institute to subsidize his income and to pay for pro-Washington reportage. Upon receiving funds from Washington, Thompson noted that he could influence five papers to support Washington's interests: The Kentucky Standard, the Freeman, the Advocate, the Citizen, and the Colored American. He could also occasionally send letters to the Chicago Monitor. Recognizing the importance of this subsidy, Thompson recommended W. Allison Sweeney, editor of the Chicago Monitor, the Chicago Conservator, and the Chicago Leader to receive subsidy as well.

Outside of this sphere, Booker T. Washington was criticized by some members of the black press, especially in the Boston Guardian. Important critics included William Monroe Trotter, William H. Ferris, George W. Forbes, and Clement G. Morgan. Ferris came to Washington in January 1903 and spoke in front of the Bethel Literary and Historical Society on January 6, 1903. As a reply, R. W. Thompson spoke in front of the Second Baptist Lyceum on January 25 in support of Booker T. Washington. Thompson laid out 15 principles of the Washington and the Tuskegee Institute, focusing on agricultural, industrial, and labor as the path to black improvement and stating that Washington does not, for instance, endorsed the elimination of suffrage for blacks in any state, but that black people must make his own place in the world. In 1999, Jacqueline M. Moore argued that Thompson's paper failed to hold his ground against Ferris, who was present at the talk.

The Second Baptist Lyceum met again on February 3 to hear a paper by Jesse Lawson in favor of Washington. In support of Washington were Robert H. Terrell, Bishop Walters, Dr. William Bruce Evans, J. H. Ewing, and Thompson, and those against were W. H. Ferris, Armond W. Scott, Lafayette M. Hershaw, T. M. Dent, Shelby James Davidson, and Mrs. Ida D. Bailey. Terrell, Evans, Lawson, and Thompson all owed positions or favors to Washington's influence. John C. Dancy, George Henry White, Mrs. Anna Evans Murray wife of Daniel Alexander Payne Murray, Reuben S. Smith, Kelly Miller, Prof. Lewis Baxter Moore, and John P. Green were neutral. Thompson's articles about these meetings in support of Washington's position was published in the Atlanta Age, the Indianapolis Freeman, Philadelphia Tribune, Baltimore Afro-American Ledger, The Charleston WV Advocate, and the Colored American. This controversy continued into the summer where important meetings in Louisville and Boston saw heated argument which even led to blows and Trotter's and Granville Martin's imprisonment.

Thompson moved from the Washington, D.C. during the last week of February or the first week of March in 1903 to the Tuskegee Institute in Tuskegee, Alabama. He succeeded J. Frank Armstrong as the assistant to Emmett Scott, who was private secretary to Booker T. Washington. In August 1903, after six months working at the Tuskegee Institute, Thompson was given a civil service position in the United States Jeffersonville Quartermaster Depot in Jeffersonville, Indiana, just across the river from Louisville.

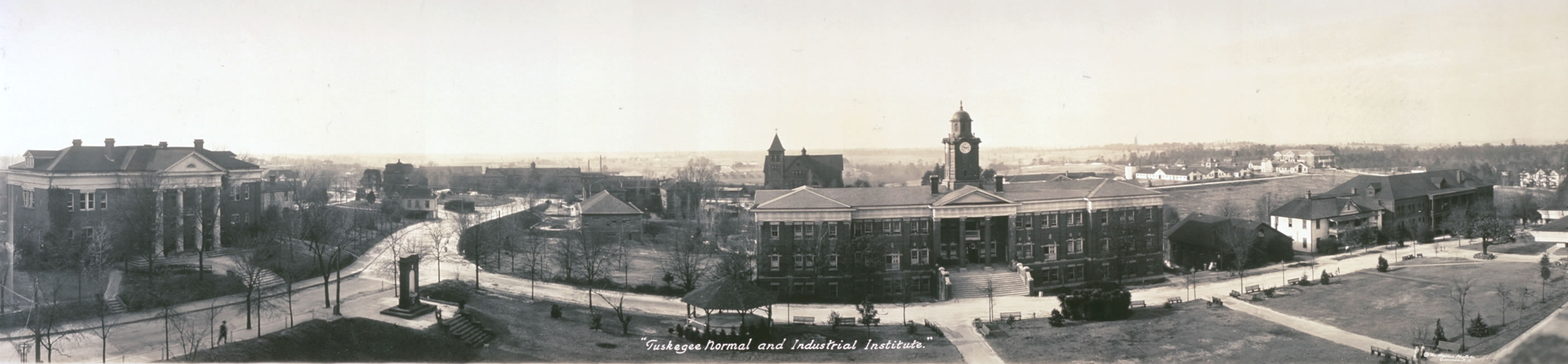
Tuskegee campus, 1916

=== Continued relationship with Washington ===
The friction in the African-American community continued and Thompson's role as a newspaperman remained fundamental. In 1905, W. E. B. Du Bois and William Monroe Trotter founded the Niagara Movement as a call for opposition to racial segregation and disenfranchisement, and it was opposed to policies of accommodation and conciliation promoted by African-American leaders such as Booker T. Washington. Washington requested that Emmett Scott direct Thompson and other newspaper men, including W. Calvin Chase, to ignore the Niagara Movement. Thompson had already referenced the movement with some sarcasm and proceeded to avoid the movement in his papers, writing "to advertise the movement by opposition even, would be to magnify it."

The Colored American failed in 1906 and Washington, who had supported it, now moved his support to the Washington Bee, W. Calvin Chase editor. Chase had opposed Washington, but needed the money. Washington used his political influence with Theodore Roosevelt and William Howard Taft to try to remove Lafayette Hershaw and Freeman H. M. Murray from their government positions and spy on meetings of the Niagara Movement. Thompson and Chase both felt uncomfortable supporting Washington's actions in these matters, and received additional payment from Washington to secure their support.

Thompson continued to work closely with Washington for the rest of Washington's life. In 1909 he traveled through South Carolina with Washington, assisting the educator and writing about his work there.

== Dispute with Calvin Chase ==
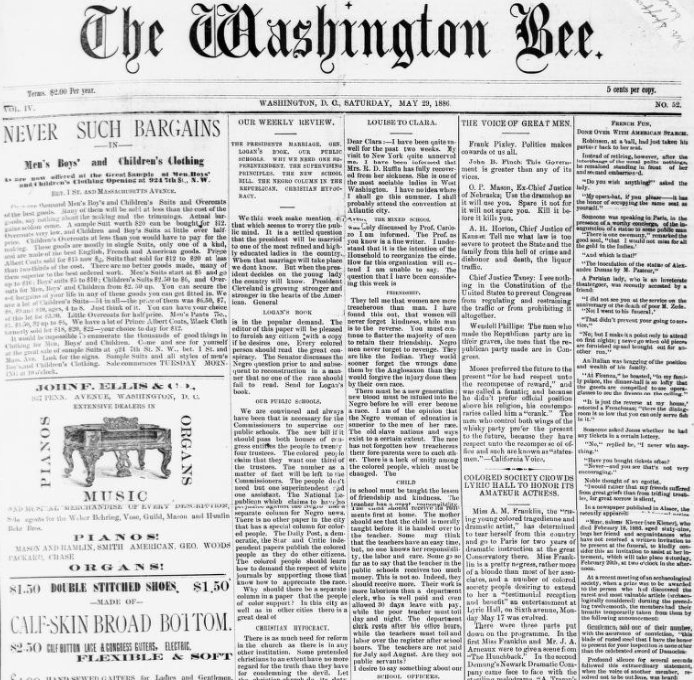
The Washington Bee – May 29, 1886

Calvin Chase of the Washington Bee was not, usually, fond of Thompson. In 1909, in Louisville, Thompson founded the National Negro Press Association in conjunction with the National Negro Business League and twice served as its president. In 1910, Chase attacked the organization, calling it "fake" and, writing in the Washington Bee, called Thompson "an editor without a paper", to which Thompson replied from the Indianapolis Freeman that Chase's Bee was "a paper without an editor".

Thompson continued to clerk for the federal government, transferring at the recommendation of Henry Lincoln Johnson in 1911 from the War Department to the Treasury Department where he took the position of messenger for Assistant Secretary Robert O. Bailey. When Bailey left the position, Thompson's position was challenged by black Democrats supported by the Washington Bee who felt that Thompson was no longer a Democrat. Chase and the Bee continued to battle with Thompson for some time. In 1914, Thompson was rebuked by the Indianapolis Freeman and the Chicago Defender for criticism of Ralph W. Tyler that Thompson had published in the two papers. In the spring of 1914, Thompson helped J. Finlay Wilson to start a new black paper in Washington, DC, called the Sun. Thompson was a principal contributor to the paper, which switched leadership from Wilson to T. Thomas Fortune in the summer of 1914, and continued to provoke the ire of Chase. The issue cooled, and by 1918, The Bee reported that in a commencement address of the Columbia Conservatory of Music, Thompson and Judge Robert Terrel both took the stage, with Terrel saying of Thompson that "he is one of the greatest colored journalists in the country, and commended his efforts to uplift the race". After Thompson's death, Chase was in a bitter battle to remove Roscoe Conkling Bruce from his position as assistant superintendent of DC schools in charge of colored schools and supported Thompson's daughter, Vivian, in an effort to gain for her a position as a teacher against Bruce's opposition.

== Assistant in the War Department ==
In August 1918, the United States' increased involvement in World War I mean a growing war department. Emmett J. Scott, then secretary of the Tuskegee Institute, was brought on as special assistant to the Secretary of War. William H. Davis, Charles A. Wilson, Charles L. Webb, and Thompson were brought in to be assistants to Scott, the department assigned with caring for the interests of black soldiers and civilians during the war. Scott and Thompson continued to work in the War Department until late January, 1920, when Thompson suffered from a nervous breakdown complicated with stomach troubles which would lead to his death on February 12.
