= Lafayette M. Hershaw =

American civil rights activist (1863–1945)

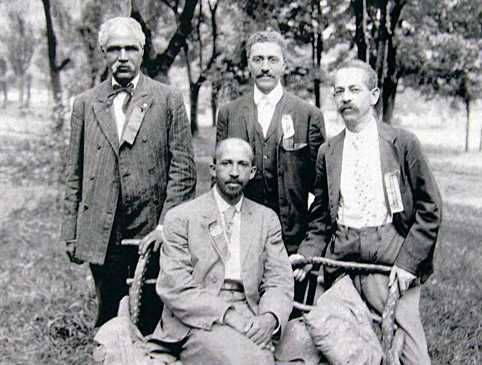
- Niagara Movement leaders W. E. B. Du Bois (seated), and (left to right) J. R. Clifford, Hershaw, and F. H. M. Murray at Harper's Ferry.
- Born: Lafayette McKeene Hershaw; May 10, 1863; Clay County, North Carolina, U.S.
- Died: September 2, 1945 (aged 82); Washington, D.C., U.S.
- Education: Clark Atlanta University; Howard University
- Occupations: Journalist, lawyer, clerk
- Spouse: Charlotte Monroe

Lafayette M. Hershaw (May 10, 1863 – September 2, 1945) was an American journalist, lawyer, and a clerk and law examiner for the United States General Land Office of the United States Department of the Interior. He was a key intellectual figure among African Americans in Atlanta in the 1880s and in Washington, D.C., from 1890 until his death. He was a leader of the intellectual social groups in the capital such as Bethel Literary and Historical Society and the Pen and Pencil Club. He was a strong supporter of W. E. B. Du Bois and was one of the thirteen organizers of the Niagara Movement, the forerunner to the NAACP. He was an officer of the D.C. Branch of the NAACP from its inception until 1928. He was also a founder of the Robert H. Terrell Law School and served as the school's president.

== Life ==
Lafayette McKeene Hershaw was born on May 10, 1863, in Clay County, North Carolina, to Abraham Hershaw and Anne McKeene. He had African, Native American, and French blood and learned to speak and read French, Spanish, and German. Among his first job was working for moonshiners in the mountain wilderness of the region. Hershaw began his studies at Atlanta University in 1879 and received a Bachelor of Arts from the school in 1886. He also studied law at Howard University and received a bachelor of laws from that school in 1892. Hershaw was described as sad-eyed and having a fuzzy mustache.

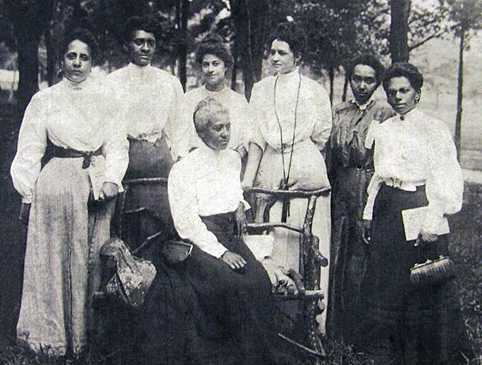
Women at the 1906 Niagara Movement Conference at Harper's Ferry: Mrs. Gertrude Wright Morgan (seated) and (left to right) Mrs. O.M. Waller, Mrs. H.F.M. Murray, Mrs. Mollie Lewis Kelan, Mrs. Ida D. Bailey, Miss Sadie Shorter, and Mrs. Charlotte Hershaw.

On July 11, 1888, he married Charlotte Monroe. He had three daughters, Rosa Cecile (who married James T. W. Granady, Howard alum and Harlem, New York doctor), Alice May, and Fay M. Charlotte died on October 26, 1930.

Hershaw died September 2, 1945, in the Freedmen's Hospital in Washington D.C. His funeral was at the Plymouth Congregational Church and he was buried in Lincoln Memorial Cemetery.

== Atlanta public schools ==
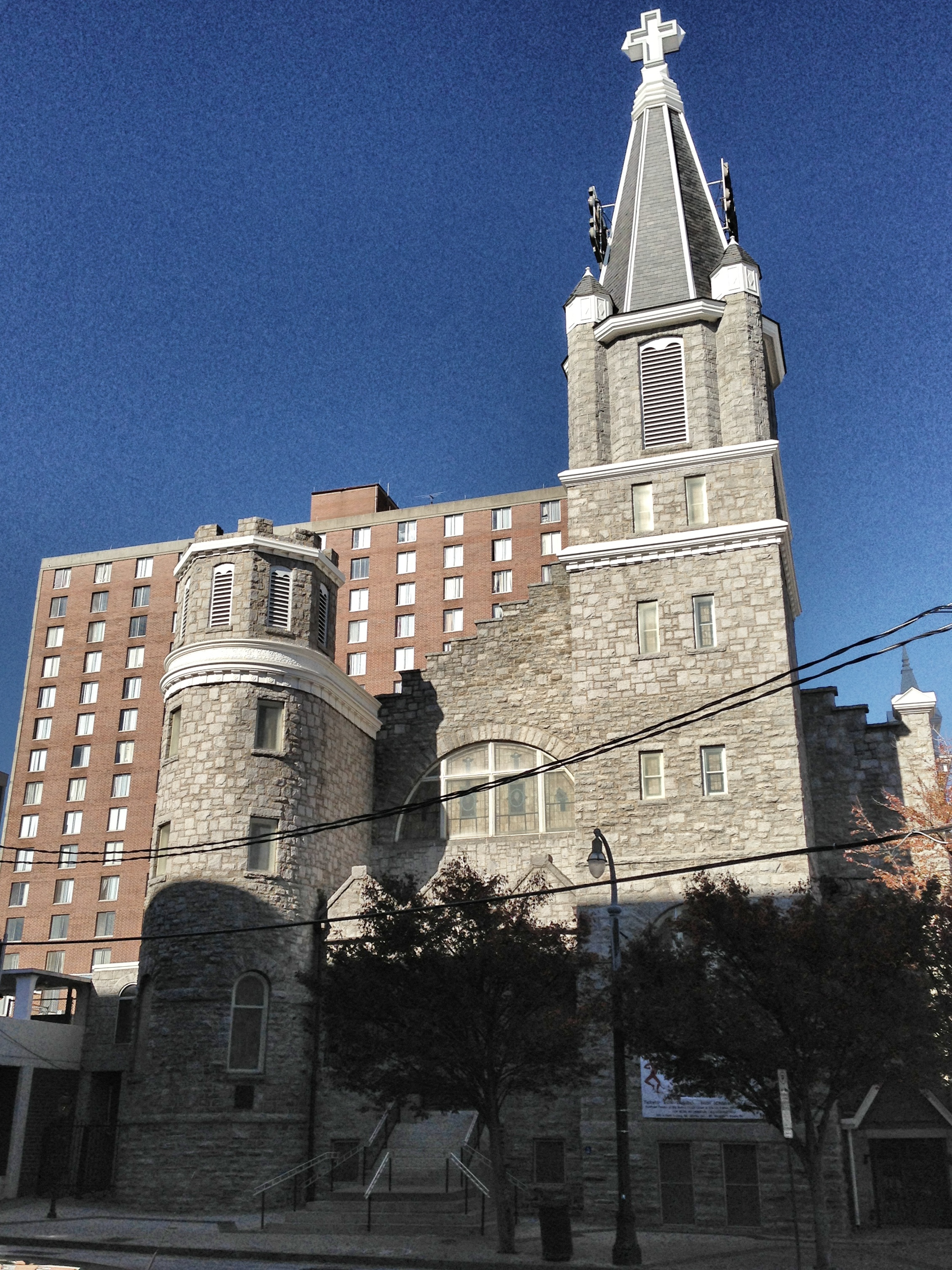
Gate City School was first held in the basement of Big Bethel AME Church in Atlanta

Hershaw's career in public service began in Atlanta where he worked as a teacher and principal of the Gate City School in the Atlanta Public School District serving from 1886 to 1889. Atlanta University was, at that time, employing white and black teachers and included students of both races (many of the white students were children of white faculty). In 1889, Georgia Legislator W. C. Glenn introduced what would be passed as the Glenn Bill to mandate that all educational facilities be segregated by race, but to also create normal schools for African Americans. While this bill was supported by some black leaders, including AME bishop Henry McNeal Turner, Hershaw was very vocal against it.

In July 1889, Hershaw told an audience of blacks that education was of higher quality in the North than in the South, spoke highly of the influence of northern ideas on the Chautaqua School in Lithia Springs, Georgia, and of the positive effect of Northern capital and engineering in the South. This speech offended Colonel W. S. Thompson and Judge William Roberson Hammond of the Board of Education in the City of Atlanta, and the pair had Hershaw fired. Thompson implied that he would like to exile or execute Hershaw, but his position forbade such an action, and that he would like Hershaw to leave Atlanta.

== Washington, D.C., and the Department of the Interior ==
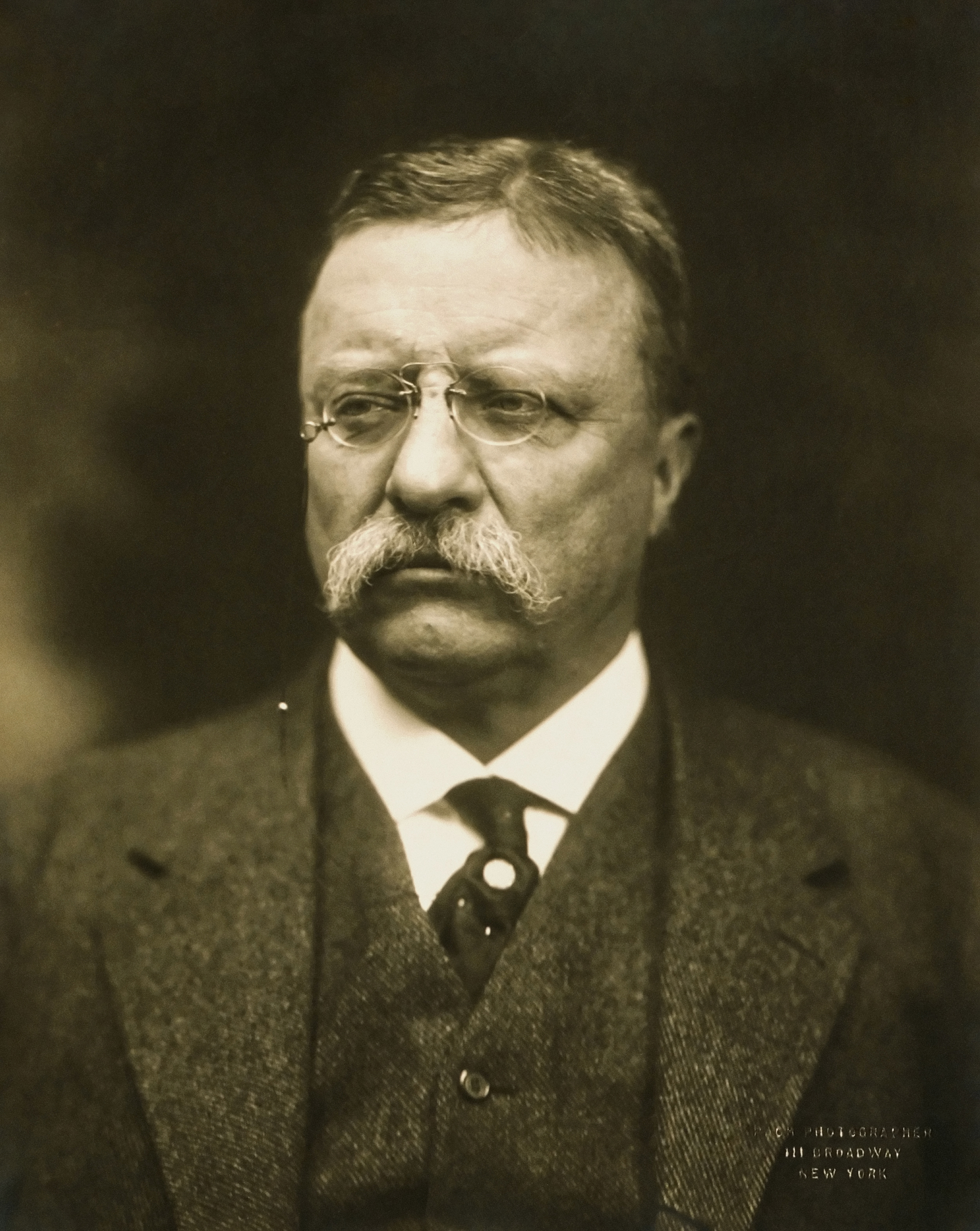
Theodore Roosevelt

In 1890 he came to Washington, D.C., and began working for the United States Civil Service as a land examiner in the Department of the Interior, where he worked for forty-two years. It was suggested Hershaw's appointment was in part a result of a pronouncement by Theodore Roosevelt while he was a Civil Service Commissioner that color could not be a barrier to appointment. However, during Roosevelt's presidency, he was criticized by the paper, "The Colored American", for doing editorial work for anti-Roosevelt papers such as the Washington Bee. He responded that he did support the president and the Republican Party, and believed Roosevelt stood for justice, civil equality, and fair play. While not campaigning for Roosevelt, he did travel the country with fellow federal employee Judson Whitlocke Lyons to speak at republican events in October 1904.

In 1907, Hershaw and others were rallying opposition to Booker T. Washington's Tuskegee Institute and T. Roosevelt in the black press. Washington sent his assistant, New York Customs Agent Charles W. Anderson to suggest action against the radicals to Roosevelt. Anderson opposed the idea of Niagara movement members holding federal jobs and suggested to the president that Hershaw was responsible for the problems in the press and that Hershaw should be demoted. Roosevelt sent Anderson to the Secretary of the Interior Hitchcock, and requested the secretary reduce Hershaw's rank or transfer him to a disagreeable job. Anderson's success in this case was repeated against Freeman H. M. Murray when Murray stoked the ire of Washington.

In spite of the intrigue, Hershaw had a good relationship with many politicians in Washington, even white politicians with whose policies he disagreed. From 1893 to 1896, Hershaw served under Secretary of the Interior M. Hoke Smith, and the pair continued a relationship after Smith's term ended. Hershaw knew and became friends with Woodrow Wilson when Wilson was a struggling lawyer in Atlanta. Wilson opposed segregation of Hershaw from white members of the Civil Service during the implementation of that policy in 1913. In 1925, Hershaw was promoted to Assistant Law Examiner, the highest position held up to that time by a black man in the Land Office.

== Early support for Booker T. Washington ==
"The Atlanta Compromise"
The opening of Booker T. Washington's "Atlanta Compromise" speech to the Atlanta Cotton States and International Exposition, recorded in 1908

In 1895, Booker T. Washington presented a speech that came to be known as the Atlanta Exposition Speech or the Atlanta Compromise Speech. This outlined Washington's conservative approach and came to represent a compromise in the South of black education and due process in exchange for white political rule. In Washington, D.C., intellectual groups held a number of meetings where the speech was discussed and debated. At meetings of the Bethel Literary and Historical Society, the Shiloh Baptist Lyceum, and elsewhere, Hershaw supported Washington. While some claimed Washington spoke of blacks having a low menial position in the history of the nation, Hershaw claimed that the speech was "logical, instructive, and sensible" and focused on the portion of the speech which "advised harmony and friendly relations between the races". Other government workers: A. E. Clark (society president and clerk at the Pension Office), Jesse Lawson (also a clerk at the Pension Office and editor of The Colored American, Washington, D.C., and John Wesley Cromwell also endorsed the speech while non-government workers condemned it; leading to criticism of supporters of Washington for apparent willingness to support compromise so that they do not put their jobs at risk.

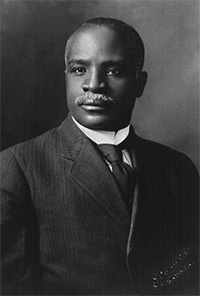
Kelly Miller

In 1898, Kelly Miller gave the address to the graduating class of Howard University. In that address, Miller spoke of the advancement of blacks. In an editorial reply, Charles Remond Douglass saw the argument as similar to those of Booker T. Washington that black people must show through their achievements that they deserve their position in civilization. This offended the son of the famous escaped slave and radical black rights activist Frederick Douglass. In a series of articles in The Colored American, a Washington, D.C., black weekly, Hershaw defended Miller that the contribution of African Americans is indeed substantial and Miller expresses that fact well, but that there is much room for improvement. After a few more editorials, Douglass recognized that the remainder of Miller's address clarified the issue and the real problem lay in the excerpt by the newspaper, The Washington Post, which only included the offensive paragraph that minimized the value of blacks.

== Increased radicalization ==
Near the end of the 1890s, he began to focus his interest on urban blacks. In 1897 he presented a study of excess mortality of urban blacks to various audiences. Hershaw returned to Atlanta in 1898 to present his work at the Third Atlanta Conference, an important conference on the subject of civil rights and black life in America and run by W. E. B. DuBois. This was among the earliest intellectual interactions between Hershaw and the civil rights giant. And in 1899, he concluded that black rights organizations were spreading themselves too thin and they should focus more on one single thing.

== The Bethel Literary and Historical Society ==
After arriving in Washington, D.C., Hershaw joined the intellectual elite of that town. In 1892 he spoke in front of the Bethel Literary and Historical Society, giving a talk on January 12 on, "Protection and its relation to the American Negro". He became a regular attendee of meetings and, as mentioned above, played an important dissenting role in criticism of Booker T. Washington by the group in 1895. In 1896, Hershaw offered a resolution calling for the school board, the District of Columbia Commissioners, and Congress to improved manual training for black students in Washington, D.C., and Hershaw was elected president of the society in 1897. Hershaw also led the society to support calls for civil service reform made by Robert H. Terrell, who presented on the subject in June 1897. During that period, Hershaw also spoke in support of anti-lynching activists such as Ida B. Wells and John Edward Bruce

== Pen and Pencil Club ==
In September 1899, a group of black journalists and writers sought to organize themselves into a club out of which the Pen and Pencil Club was born. The club quickly became one of the most prominent literary clubs in Washington. Hershaw was the president of the club in 1901 with Daniel Murray and Richard W. Thompson first and second vice presidents. Events that year included the feting of former Congressman George H. White, who was then included in the clubs membership. Another major annual event was Frederick Douglass Day, when the club would gather annually to celebrate the anniversary of his birth. In 1902, Hershaw stepped down as president in favor of Henry P. Slaughter who was followed by Arthur S. Gray but continued to be a prominent member and a prolific speaker at the clubs events. The club was a part of a fabric of literary and social clubs in the capital; for example, it convened a meeting in late 1902 with the Bethel Literary and Historical Society and in early 1903 at the Second Baptist Lyceum where members of the club gave talks on black history. At that speech at the Second Baptist Lyceum, Hershaw quotes with great admiration W. E. B. Du Bois famous line that "the problem of the twentieth century is the problem of the color line" before presenting an argument that hews closely to the ideas of Du Bois: the equality of blacks and whites, the importance of political and civil equality rather than simply industrial opportunity, the illegitimacy of "Jim Crow Cars", and against compromise. While this did not represent an irreparable split from Washington, it did signify an increased affinity between Hershaw and the Bethel Society and W. E. B. Du Bois.

== Association with W. E. B. Du Bois ==
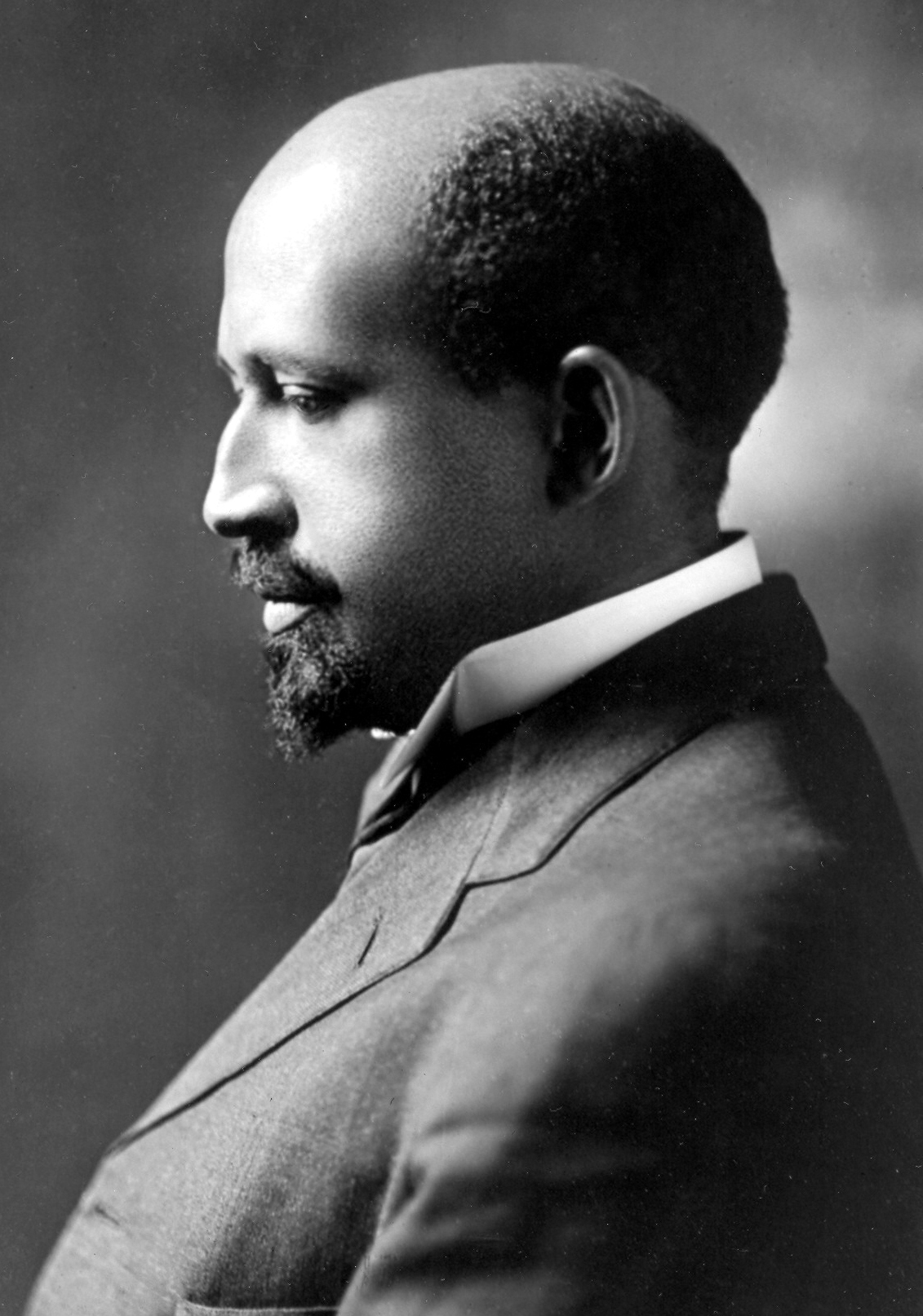
Du Bois c. 1911

As a prominent member of D.C. literary and activist circles, Hershaw frequently presented papers and speeches regarding the sociology, economics, and history of Blacks. In the late spring of 1905, he traveled to Atlanta to participate in the Tenth Atlanta Conference, a conference put on by W. E. B. Du Bois and one in which he had participated before. Thus, on May 30, 1905, he was a presenter at the tenth anniversary meeting of what was called the Atlanta Conference to study the Negro problems at Atlanta University with the theme Methods and Results. The conference was presided by university president Horace Bumstead and W. E. B. Du Boise was corresponding secretary. Tougaloo College President Frank G Woodworth, and General Education Board of Hampton member W. T. B. Williams. Women's meetings were addressed by Frances Kellor, Mary Ovington, and Butler Wilson. Other speakers included Professor G. W. Henderson, T. J Jones, President of Talladega College Benjamin M. Nyce, and Cornell University Professor and United States Census agent Walter F. Wilcox and Mattie A. McAdoo sang for the conference. On the last night of the conference, Hershaw delivered a speech written by Du Bois called, "Address to the Country", which was extremely well received.

=== Niagara Movement ===
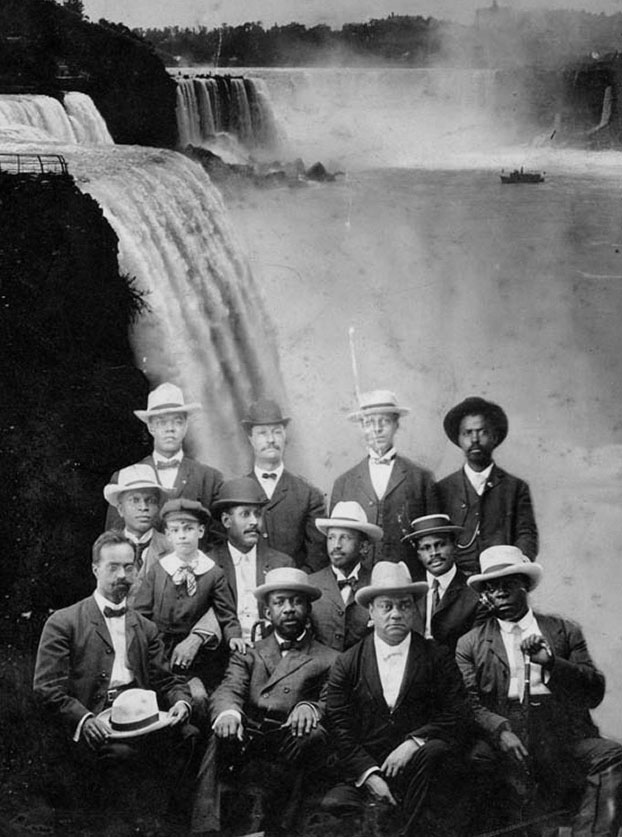
Founders of the Niagara Movement, 1905 silver gelatin print

This was followed less than two months later by another meeting, the July 11, 12, and 13 1905 first meeting of the Niagara Movement at Buffalo, New York called by Du Bois. The meeting saw Du Bois elected general secretary of the movement, George H. Jackson of Cincinnati as general treasurer and Dubois, William H. Richards, B. S. Smith, William Monroe Trotter, and William Henry Harrison Hart signed the official statement of the movement and Hershaw was among the twenty nine African Americans who attended. By December, Hershaw was working as secretary of the movement.

The movement grew and the second meeting of the movement occurred at Harper's Ferry in honor of John Brown August 15–19. The meeting was welcomed by Storer College president Henry T. McDonald and was marked by reports by Niagara Movement state secretaries. Hershaw's speech, as well as that of C. E. Bently, George W. Mitchell, Byron Gunner, O. M. Waller, and C. G. Morgan were noted as especially strong. Hershaw also read an address to the country urging political action.

While the Niagara movement was marked by its opposition to the attitude of compromise of Booker T. Washington, Washington was still an important scholar, and he was invited to give a talk about Frederick Douglass to a meeting of the Pen and Paper club, now led by Henry P. Slaughter with Hershaw still an officer. However, Hershaw ultimately found himself on Du Bois' side in the dispute. He denied Du Bois or himself having any animosity towards Washington, but spoke against Washington's relationship with his "Masters and myrmidons ... sponsors and retainers". Washington's supporters saw Du Bois and Hershaw as elitists and sentimental in comparison to Washington's practicality and at least in part characterized the dispute in rural versus urban terms. Ultimately, Hershaw's devotion to Du Bois put Hershaw on an "enemies list" in Washington's personal correspondence in the early 1900s which began with William M. Trotter, Archibald Grimké, George Forbes, and Clement G. Morgan, but eventually included Hershaw, Judson Lyons, Francis James Grimké, Napoleon Marshall, and William Calvin Chase, all Du Bois supporters,

=== The Horizon ===
In order to publicize the views of the movement, Du Bois, Hershaw, and F. H. M. Murray began publication of the magazine, The Horizon. The journal was published from 1907 to 1910; Murray was printer and Du Bois and Hershaw were co-editors W. M. Sinclair and William Monroe Trotter were noted as other key players in the movement and involved in the magazine. The Horizon's scope went beyond black rights, and here and elsewhere Hershaw was vocal about women's rights and a supporter of suffrage for black women. Hershaw's most frequent contribution to Horizon was a column called "The Out-Look", a view of the black experience from the perspective of the white world, while Murray contributed "The In-Look" about the black experience from the view of black and the black press and Du Bois wrote "The Over-Look" about any issue in the black experience he felt necessary. Hershaw's "The Out-Look" has been called the "least coherent and least memorable of the three sections". The paper was not always in perfect harmony, and Hershaw and Murray frequently fought over material to be included in the "Horizon". In 1908, DuBois, Hershaw, Clement G. Morgan, W. H. Ferris, and Kelly Miller broke with Trotter; and Trotter left the journal and the movement. Seeking greater radicalism, Trotter created the Negro American Political League. Going beyond black civil rights, in The Horizon Hershaw was vocal about women's rights and a supporter of suffrage for black women.

=== NAACP ===
After the departure of Trotter, the Niagara movement declined. In 1909, Moorfield Storey, Mary White Ovington, and Du Bois called for the formation of a new body, leading to the formation of the National Negro Committee (the Committee of 40) on May 31, 1909, which included Hershaw. Out of this was born the National Association for the Advancement of Colored People (NAACP). Washington, D.C., contributed a number of early NAACP members, including Hershaw, W. P. Stafford, Mary Church Terrell, J. M. Waldroon, L. B. Moore, and Kelly Miller, and the group would create a branch of the association in Washington, D.C., which was one of the largest and most powerful branches.

Hershaw played an important role in the local and national NAACP. In 1911, a body of NAACP representatives including Hershaw and led by Dr. W. A. Sinclair were received by President Taft and delivered a request for presidential action against lynchings, a request which Taft refused saying it was a state matter.

==== Washington, D.C., branch ====
In April 1912, Archibald Grimké led the organization of a D.C. branch of the NAACP, with Hershaw an officer. Federal government desegregation was one of its first goals. In 1913, racial segregation in the federal government was often not publicly well known. Hershaw and Thomas H. R. Clarke managed to collect data to publicize the extent of the segregation in the federal government. However, segregation continued to worsen over the following two decades. Also that year J. Milton Waldron, who was then president of the D.C. branch of the NAACP, was asked to resign by the central body of the NAACP for his affiliation with the Democratic Party and reports that he used his position to gain employment in the administration of Woodrow Wilson. Hershaw played a key role in Waldron's removal and the smooth transition of the branch to the presidency of Archibald Grimké, who held the position until 1925.

In 1918, Hershaw was chairman of the D.C. Branch Executive Committee under president Archibald Grimké and worked in support of the cause of Sergeant Edgar Caldwell, who shot a white man in self-defense in Anniston, Alabama. In 1919, NAACP head Walter Francis White asked James A. Cobb to work to prevent the execution of Caldwell. Cobb arranged a meeting with Assistant Attorney General Harry Steward and brought with him Emmett Jay Scott, Caldwell's lawyer Charles Kline, Hershaw, and William Houston. The effort was unsuccessful, and Caldwell was executed on July 30, 1920.

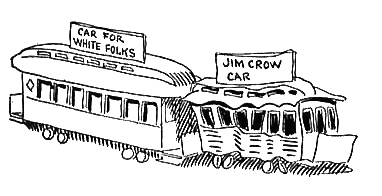
1904 caricature of "White" and "Jim Crow" rail cars by John T. McCutcheon. Despite Jim Crow's legal pretense that the races be "separate but equal" under the law, non-whites were given inferior facilities and treatment.

Also in 1919, Hershaw along with Henry Lassiter, Walter J. Singleton, Archibald Grimké, and Robert H. Terrell was a prime mover in the introduction by Congressman Martin B. Madden of a law to abolish the "Jim Crow" car. The Madden Amendment to the Esch–Cummins Act failed.

In January 1928, Hershaw resigned as director of the D.C. branch because he refused to support the organization in a fight to abolish racial segregation in the Interior Department where Hershaw still worked. Hershaw noted that he and other clerks had made a statement that they were happy with conditions.

=== Opposition to Hershaw in the black press ===
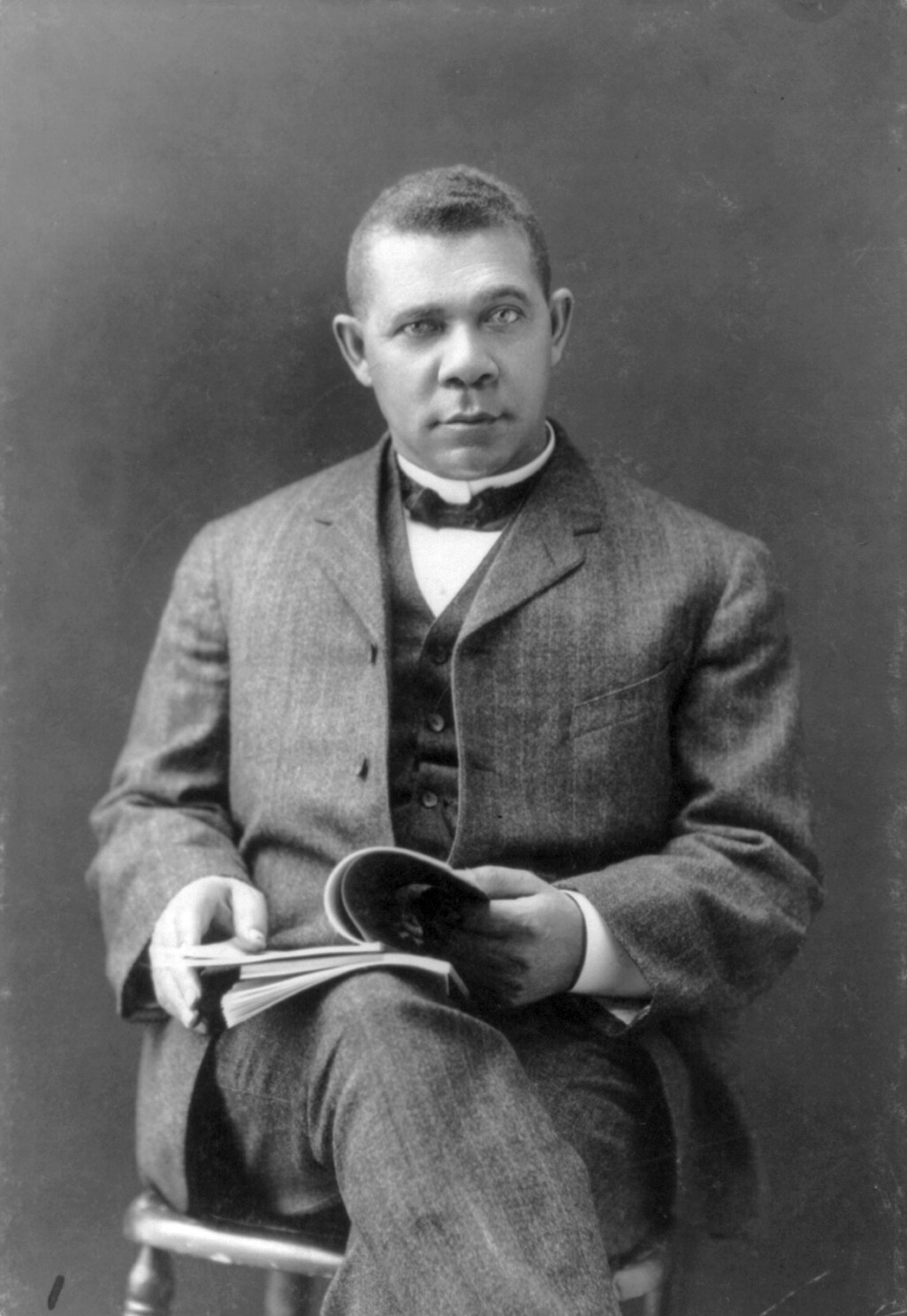
Booker T. Washington, 1903 portrait

In the 1910s he was repeatedly criticized by the pro-Booker pseudonymous columnist in the Washington Bee by the pen name of "the Sage of the Potomac". The Bee writer criticized Henshaw for taking such a large federal salary and as a member of the Bethel Literary and Historical Society for being elitist. In a letter to Booker T. Washington, journalist Ralph Waldo Tyler noted that fellow critic of Henshaw and the Bethel Society Richard W. Thompson believed the sage was he, Tyler, but that it was actually Roscoe Conkling Bruce. This was not the first time Hershaw and Tyler were on opposite sides of an issue, Tyler opposed Hershaw's push to create a black daily paper in 1899. Tyler's promotion of Hershaw's ability was credited by the Washington Bee for Hershaw's promotion in the Department of the Interior. Thompson and Hershaw were frequently associated in the 1890s and early 1900s in Washington, D.C., Hershaw even served as toastmaster for a dinner in Thompson's honor by the National Colored Personal Liberty League in April 1900. But by 1905, in the Indianapolis Freeman, Hershaw was a frequent target of Thompson in his humor column, Short Flights.

== Robert H. Terrell Law School ==
Hershaw passed the bar but did not work extensively as a lawyer. In 1931, the night school program at Howard Law School closed and George A. Parker, Philip W. Thomas, Louis R. Mehlinger, Benjamin Gaskins, Chester Jarvis, and Hershaw founded the Robert H. Terrell Law School named for their colleague who had died in 1925. Hershaw taught at the school, and served as president of the school in the mid-1930s. The school closed in 1950.

== Other memberships and activities ==
Hershaw belonged to the Oldest Inhabitants Association of the District of Columbia and was a trustee of Atlanta University. He was president of the Bethel Historical and Literary Association in 1897. Along with frequently speaking at the Second Baptist Lyceum, the Congressional Lyceum, and an officer of the Bethel Literary and Historical Society; he was president of the Shiloh Baptist Lyceum in 1902. In 1907 he was elected head of the newspaper bureau of the National Afro-American Council which quickly disappeared as members joined the Niagara Movement. In 1909 he was selected president of the Crispus Attucks Association and presided over a celebration of the anniversary of the birth of Abraham Lincoln. He was a member of Sigma Pi Phi and Phi Beta Sigma.

In the mid-1910s, Hershaw began to become more involved the American Negro Academy. By 1916, he was a member of the executive committee of that body along with Kelly Miller, J. E. Moorland, Francis J. Grimké (brother to 1917 Academy president Archibald Grimké), A. U. Craig, F. H. M. Murray, and John W. Cromwell. In 1920 and 1921, he was elected treasurer under presidents Cromwell and then Arthur A. Schomberg

In 1917. he served as first vice president along with second vice president R. W. Thompson under the presidency of Walter J. Singleton in the Mu-So-Lit club, representing D.C.'s musical, social, and literary professionals.
