= Allison Sweeney =

Allison Sweeney may refer to:

- W. Allison Sweeney (1851–1921), American newspaper writer, editor, and owner
- Alison Sweeney (born 1976), American actress
