= William Calvin Chase =

American newspaper editor (1854–1921)

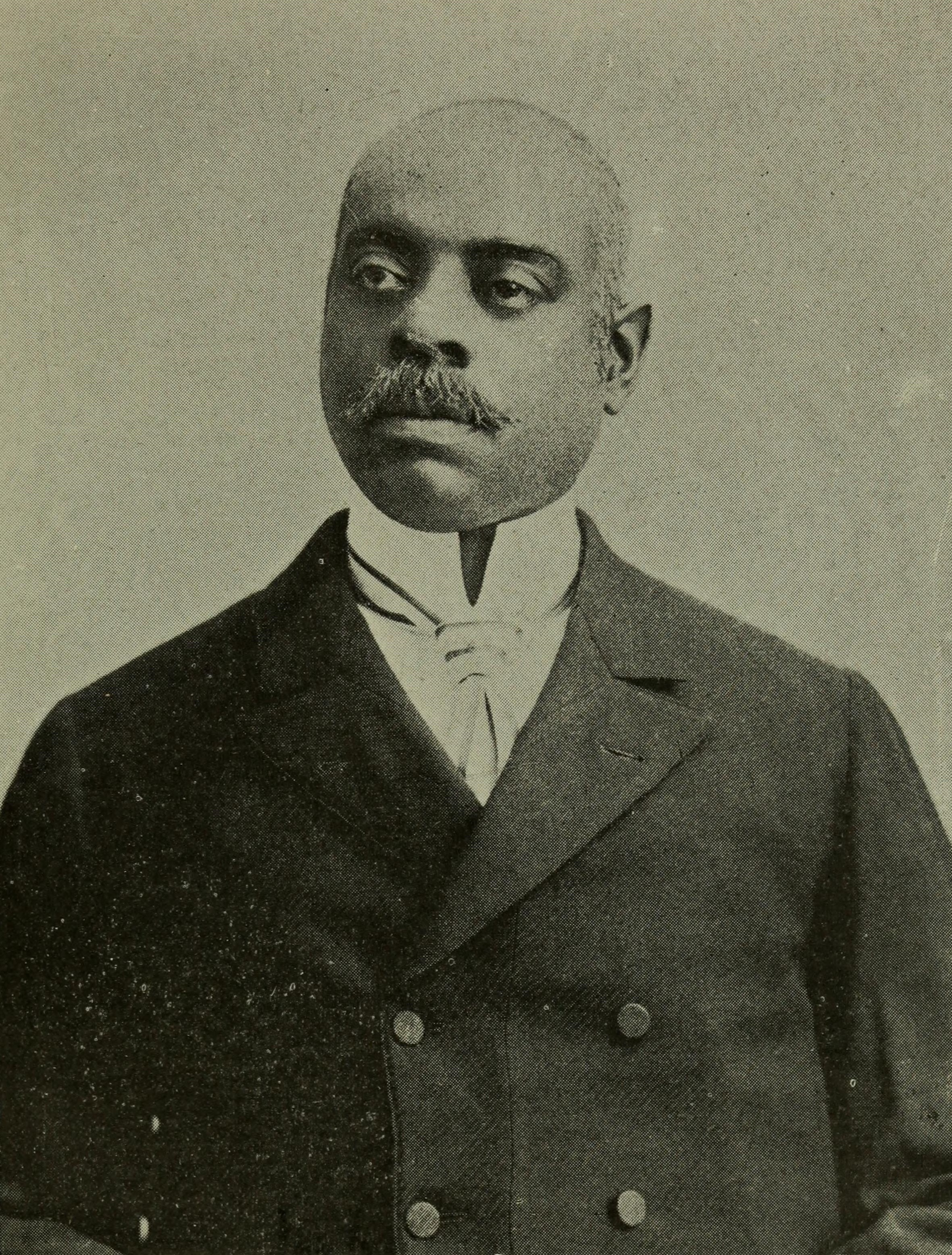
- Born: February 2, 1854; Washington, D.C.
- Died: January 3, 1921 (aged 66); Washington, D.C.
- Known for: Lawyer; Newspaper publisher; Editor
- Political party: Republican

William Calvin Chase (February 2, 1854 – January 3, 1921) was an American lawyer and newspaper editor. A native of Washington, D.C., he attended Howard University. As well as gaining admission to the bar, he edited the Washington Bee, a weekly newspaper, from 1882 until his death.

== Personal life and education ==
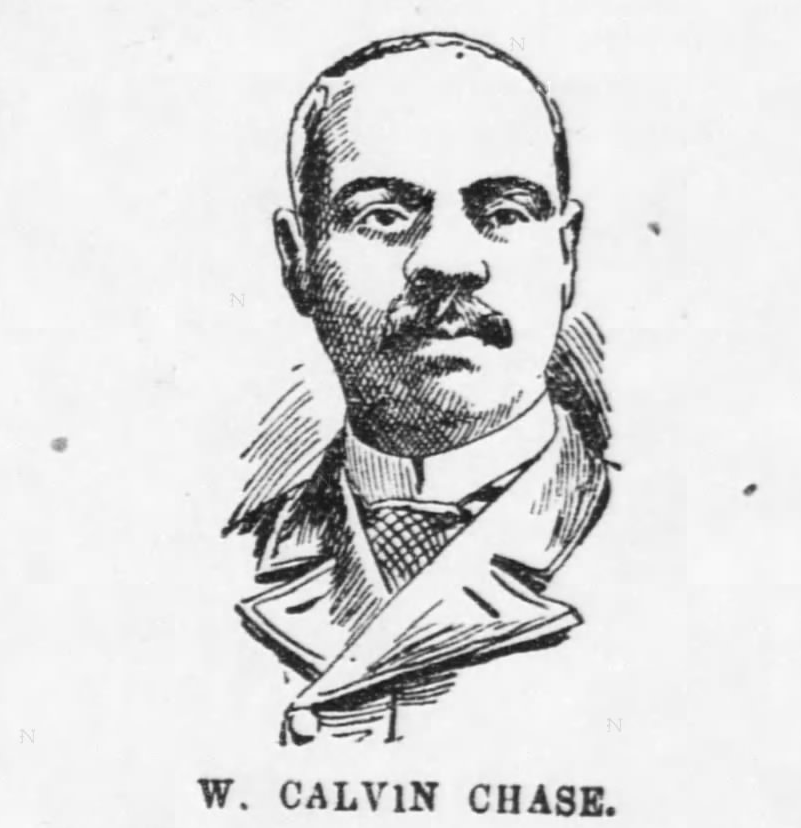
Sketch of Chase in the Bee in 1892.

Chase was born to free African-American parents in Washington, D.C. on February 2, 1854. He had five siblings. His Maryland-born father, William H. Chase, an expert blacksmith, was shot and killed in his shop in 1863. Before his father's death, William attended the private school of John F. Cook. Thereafter, young Chase was raised by his Virginia-born mother, Lucinda Seaton. He was forced to leave school and began to sell newspapers, and he became known among many newspaper offices in Washington. At age eleven he was hired to sell hats for Holley & Brother in Methuen, Massachusetts, where he attended more school. He soon moved back to Washington and returned to work as a newsboy. He left public schools and entered the Howard University Model School, "B" class and then went to Howard University. A boy during the administration of Abraham Lincoln, he became a lifelong member of the Republican Party. Chase married Arabella McCabe on January 28, 1886, and the couple had a son, William Calvin, Jr. and Beatriz, both of whom eventually worked at the Bee.

== Public life and career ==
As a student at Howard, he also worked as a clerk in the government printing office. He held that position for two years, when he was passed over for a position because he was black. He left the office and filed charges against the public printer, Almon M. Clapp. In 1875, Chase became Washington correspondent of the Boston Observer, which went out of business in 1879. Next, Chase worked at the Washington Plain Dealer. Chase desired to gain another political appointment. Frederick Douglass was at that time United States Marshal and initially desired to have Chase work in his office. Clapp contacted Douglass and asked Douglass to instead block Chase's appointment, which he did. Chase then started attacking Douglass in his writing, but the pair eventually reconciled and became close friends. Chase then was a writer at the Argus edited by Charles N. Otey. When Otey retired, Chase was made editor and G. W. Graham the papers business manager. Graham changed its name to the Free Lance but Chase was chased out when the paper was sold to a group whom Chase had criticized. Finally, in 1882, Chase moved to the Washington Bee. Within the first year of the founding of the Washington Bee, Chase became its editor and remained in that role until his death in 1921. Chase continued to seek public appointment. In 1881, Douglass was appointed Recorder of Deeds for the District of Columbia and shortly after joining the Bee, Chase was finally appointed by Douglass to a clerkship in his office. In this office, Chase wrote a criticism of G. W. Williams, History of the Negro Race and another criticism of R. Purvis, both of which caused controversies.

Soon after taking up editorship of the Bee, Chase also attended classes at Howard University Law School in 1883–1884. Continuing his editorial duties, Chase did not take a law degree and maintained his legal studies privately. He was admitted to the bar in Virginia and in Washington, D.C., in 1889, and practiced law thereafter in Washington. His standing as a lawyer and editor made Chase a Republican Party leader in Washington, and Chase was named as a District of Columbia delegate to the Republican national conventions held in 1900 and 1912.

=== As editor ===
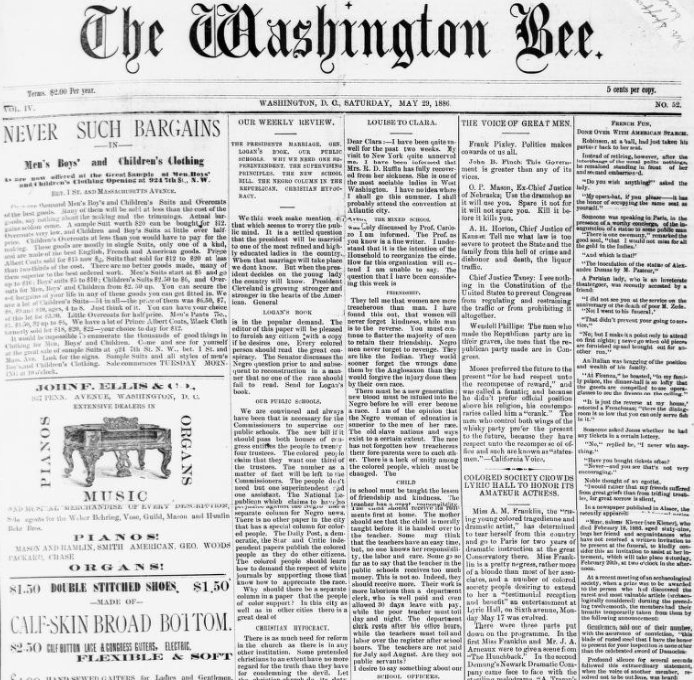
The Washington Bee – May 29, 1886

Chase's 1882–1921 editorial leadership of the Washington Bee was "superb ... [and] eventually turned the Bee into one of the most influential African American newspapers in the country." However, this service coincided with a dark period in the history of African-Americans in the United States. Post-Civil War Redeemers acquired political control over many U.S. states; with the goal of reversing many of the limited desegregation gains that had been made during the Civil War and Reconstruction, the Redeemers proclaimed a policy of Jim Crow and implicit support for lynching. The Bee attempted to crusade against these trends, leveraging its support base in the comparatively well-educated African-American community of Washington, D.C. For several years, Chase editorialized against lynching and against the Atlanta Compromise positions taken by fellow African-American leader Booker T. Washington. By the 1890s, Chase had become a leader of the Colored Press Association, an organization for Black journalists.

The Colored American, edited by R. W. Thompson failed in 1906 and Booker T. Washington, who had supported it, moved his support to the Bee. Chase had written against Washington, but needed the money and supported a number of Washington's political goals. For example, Washington used his political influence with Theodore Roosevelt and William Howard Taft to try to remove Lafayette M. Hershaw and Freeman H. M. Murray from their government positions and spy on meetings of the Niagara Movement headed by W. E. B. DuBois in 1905 and 1906. Thompson and Chase both felt uncomfortable supporting Washington's actions in these matters, and received additional payment from Washington to secure their support.

=== Libel conviction ===
In 1895, Chase published information in The Washington Bee about the misdoings of C. H. J. Taylor, appointed by President Grover Cleveland as the recorder of deeds for Washington, D.C. Taylor sued Chase for libel. Chase argued that information about the character of a public officer was relevant to the public. When instructing the jury, the judge stated:

[E]ven if the defendant should prove the truth of every charge against Taylor, he would then have to show to the entire satisfaction of the jury that he had published the charges with good motives and justifiable ends.

In addressing Chase's motives, the judge said that only the president could remove Taylor from his appointed office. The jury convicted Chase of libel, and the judge sentenced him to three months in jail. From jail, Chase petitioned Cleveland for executive clemency, which Cleveland denied.

=== Dispute with R. W. Thompson ===
Chase was not always fond of R. W. Thompson. In 1909 Thompson founded the National Negro Press Association. In 1910, Chase attacked the organization, calling it "fake" and, writing in the Washington Bee, called Thompson "an editor without a paper", to which Thompson replied from the Indianapolis Freeman that Chase's Bee was "a paper without an editor". Thompson and Chase later reconciled. At the time of Thompson's death, Chase supported Thompson and his daughter in a bitter battle to remove Roscoe Conkling Bruce from his position as assistant superintendent of DC schools in charge of colored schools.

== Later life ==
As a 1912 Republican National Convention delegate, Chase helped renominate William Howard Taft as the Republican candidate for president. His support was not successful, as the Southern-born Democratic candidate Woodrow Wilson was elected. Wilson's entry into the White House marked the extension of Redeemer policy to Washington, D.C. and the federal government, with the new administration ruthlessly re-segregating Washington offices and other places of life and work. This harmed Chase's subscriber base, and the newspaper's financial troubles continued and worsened.

== Death and honors ==
Chase attempted to respond to these dismal trends by building an editorial alliance with the newly formed National Association for the Advancement of Colored People (NAACP). His time as a second-wave civil rights activist was, however, short. On January 3, 1921 Chase died of a heart attack. The editor was found dead in his newspaper office; he had literally died at his desk. The struggling newspaper survived him by little more than a year.

William Calvin Chase was posthumously honored by memorial resolution 16-187 of the Council of the District of Columbia, adopted on February 7, 2006. The resolution cited Chase's historical significance as one of the first journalistic champions of Frederick Douglass in the African-American press, and Chase's organization of the movement to achieve the historic preservation of Douglass's later-life home, Cedar Hill.

== Further study ==
A scholarly biography of Chase, Honey for Friends, Stings for Enemies, appeared in 1973. Published by the University of Pennsylvania Press, the examination of the fighting editor's life is an expanded Ph.D dissertation. A second dissertation, which also focuses closely on Chase's life, work, and standing in Washington, D.C., is Marya Annette McQuirter's Claiming the City: African Americans, Urbanization and Leisure in Washington, D.C., 1902–1954 (2000).
