= Indianapolis Freeman =

Defunct African-American newspaper (1884–1926)

The Freeman of Indianapolis, Indiana
- A National Illustrated Colored Newspaper

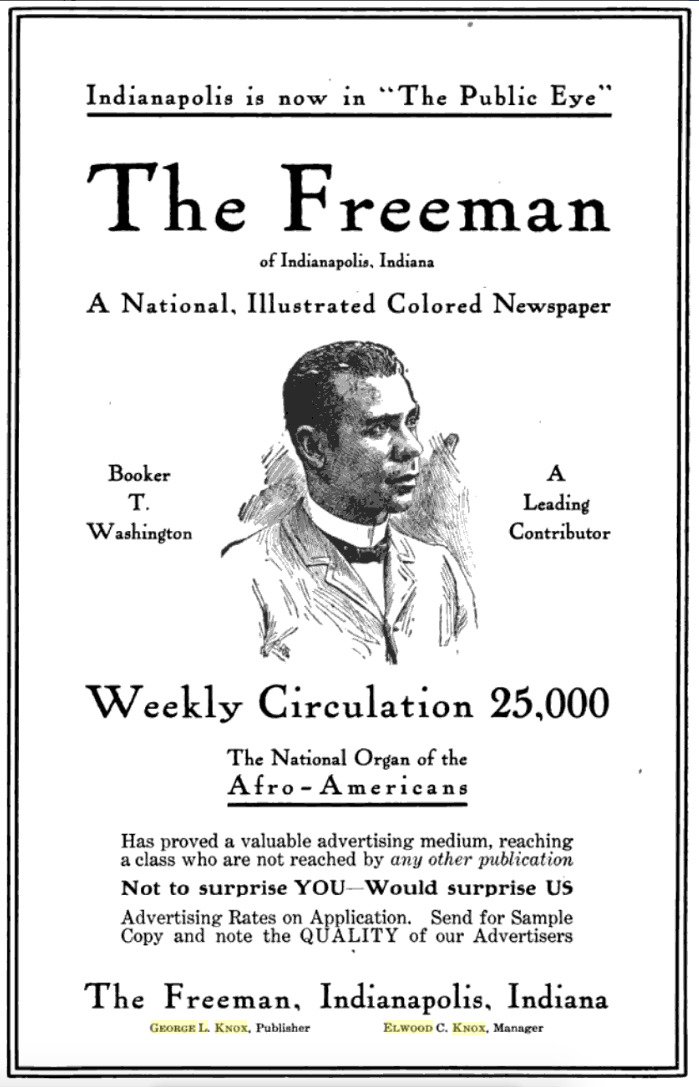
- Advertisement for The Freeman
- Type: Weekly newspaper
- Format: Broadsheet
- Owners: Louis Howland 1884-1888; Edward Elder Cooper 1888-1892; George L. Knox 1893-1926
- Founder: Louis Howland (Note: The library of congress has Louis Howland as the creator of this newspaper)
- Publisher: George L. Knox and Elwood C. Knox
- Founded: 1884
- Ceased publication: 1926
- Headquarters: Indianapolis, Indiana, U.S.
- Country: United States
- Circulation: 25,000

The Indianapolis Freeman (1884–1926) was the first illustrated black newspaper in the United States. Founder and owner Louis Howland, who was soon replaced by Edward Elder Cooper, published its first print edition on November 20, 1884.

== History ==
Cooper sold the paper to George L. Knox in 1892. Knox shifted the paper's political allegiance from Democratic to Republican because he was one of the most influential Black Republicans in Indiana. The paper shifted back toward the Democratic Party in its final days due to the power of the Ku Klux Klan over the Indiana Republican Party.

Knox was the publisher from 1893 to 1926. The paper was called "A National Illustrated Colored Newspaper" and was referred to as a national race paper. It had a circulation of 25,000. Sold internationally, it covered everything from small Black communities to sports and entertainment. Booker T. Washington was a contributor. The paper came out on Sundays and it was said its negative review could ruin a career. Hurt by inflation following World War I and competition from the more locally focused Indianapolis Recorder, the paper ceased publication in 1926.

The paper frequently featured the writings of Richard W. Thompson, who was managing editor from 1888 to 1893.

== Historic significance ==
Unlike other Black newspapers that reprinted photographs, woodcuts, and drawings at the time, the Indianapolis Freeman had a full staff of African American artists dedicated to producing original illustrations for the newspaper. The paper published representations of blackness created by Black artists for a Black viewership. The intention of the newspaper to replace white perceptions of blackness with Black representation of blackness was noted by repetition of the phrases "as observed by the Freeman's Artist" and "as seen by the artist" in illustration captions.

The Freeman employed Black agents across the country from its start, claiming to have over 200 agents in towns and cities nationally by 1914. The Freeman boasted the largest circulation of any Black newspaper, and the publication included more advertisements for Black entertainment than any other paper.
