= Richard E. S. Toomey =

American lawyer

- Born: May , 1862; Baltimore, Maryland, U.S.
- Died: April 17, 1948 (aged 85); Miami, Florida, U.S.
- Occupations: Soldier, poet, lawyer
- Political party: Republican
- Spouse(s): Minnie D. Clem, Nandethes Beatrix Dillard

Richard E. S. Toomey (May 1862 – April 17, 1948) was a soldier, poet, civil servant, and lawyer in Washington, DC and Miami, Florida. His poetry gained popularity in the early 1900s and he was called "The Soldier Poet". He was well known in Washington, DC, and friends with Paul Laurence Dunbar. Outside of poetry, he served in the Spanish–American War and became a popular speaker in political and social causes in DC. He graduated from Howard University Law School in Washington DC in 1906. In 1913, he moved to Miami, where he was Miami's first black attorney.

== Early life ==
Toomey was born in May 1862 to an oyster farmer in Maryland, likely in Baltimore. Toomey enlisted in the Army and served during the Spanish–American War in Company B of the 8th United States Volunteer Infantry (colored), also known as the "8th Immune Regiment"; immune referring to the mistaken belief that black soldiers were immune from tropical diseases they may face during service. His regiment's service in the war was in the US, where he was in charge of the bulk of the drilling and training of his company at Fort Thomas, Kentucky. He enlisted as a private and was promoted to first lieutenant during the war. In spite of never reaching the battlefield, Toomey's service was highly valued and he was reported in 1922 to be the only black soldier to receive a sword from the War Department for meritorious service.

== Education and poetry ==
Toomey graduated from Lincoln University of Pennsylvania. and later was in the class of 1906 at Howard Law School. After returning from the war, he became well known for his poetry. In 1902, Toomey became the second black person to read at the Congressional Library, after Paul Laurence Dunbar. At the event, he read selections from his book, Thoughts for True Americans, and his brother, L. Ellsworth Toomey, played selections on the piano.

He was given the nickname, "The Soldier Poet", by Dunbar, and was also known as "Poet of the People". Toomey's poetry is a noted example of the coexistence of patriotism and racial unrest. His poem, Southern Chivalry, attacks lynching, while The American Negro calls for blacks to be true to the nations ideals. Ode to Columbia is a poem about the battle of Manila Bay, and Self-Effacement calls on blacks to maintain pride and strength. His oration made him popular among the capitals black elites. In 1905, he was elected president of the Lyceum of the 2nd Baptist Church.

He was politically active throughout his life. He campaigned for Theodore Roosevelt in the 1904 presidential campaign, and frequently worked in support of Republican candidates.

== Law career ==
Toomey passed the Washington DC bar exam and was admitted to the district court on October 5, 1906. He was listed as from Tennessee. Even before receiving his law degree, Toomey was a clerk in the federal government. In 1910, while working in the US Post Office Department, he was charged with criminal libel for a letter he wrote against Dr. A. M. Curtis. He was found guilty and his sentence of six months in jail was suspended.

Three years later, in 1913, he moved to Miami and began practicing law, becoming Miami's first black attorney. He continued his poetry in Florida, becoming known as the "Soldier Poet of Florida".

== Personal life ==
He married Minnie D. Clem of Greeneville, Tennessee on September 27, 1888. Their first son, Harry Tildon Toomey, died in 1905. Another son was George Austin Toomey. On November 22, 1916, Toomey again married, then to Nandethes Beatrix Dillard.
