= The Chicago Conservator =

African-American newspaper in Chicago

- Founder(s): Ferdinand Barnett
- Founded: 1878
- Language: English
- Ceased publication: 1914
- City: Chicago, Illinois
- Country: United States
- Circulation: 1,000

The Chicago Conservator was an American newspaper. Founded by attorney Ferdinand Barnett in 1878, it was the first African-American newspaper in Chicago.

== History ==
Barnett founded the newspaper in 1878 and served as co-editor with R. P. Bird. A.T. Hall served as the paper's city editor during its early years and was in charge of the office. During his tenure as editor, Barnett used the newspaper to campaign for the capitalization of the word "Negro". The Conservator focused mainly on editorials and commentary, although it did feature factual news pieces. It also published stories chronicling activities at local churches, social clubs and black fraternal organizations.

Alexander Clark and his son Alexander Clark, Jr. purchased the Conservator in 1882 and owned it until 1887. In 1884, Alexander Clark Sr. began editing the paper himself.

In 1893, Ida B. Wells began writing for the newspaper. She later purchased a partial ownership in the publication. She married Barnett in 1895 and then took over full ownership of the Conservator. She was the editor from 1895 to 1897.

After Wells retired to raise her children, D. Robert Wilkins became the editor of the Conservator. He was a proponent of the Niagara Movement, and the paper became very critical of Booker T. Washington under Wilkins' tenure. Washington was so upset that he gave money to W. Allison Sweeney, the editor of the Chicago Leader, one of the Conservator's rival publications, hoping to put Wilkins out of business. When that did not work, he tried unsuccessfully to buy the paper.

In January 1908, Wilkins was replaced by Jesse Max Barber, the former editor of The Voice of the Negro, who had moved to Chicago from Atlanta following the Atlanta race riot. After Barber penned a negative editorial concerning Washington, he used his influence with the Conservator's stockholders to have Barber fired.

Monroe Alpheus Majors, a supporter of Washington, became the editor of the Conservator in 1908 and served in that position until 1911. The paper went out of business in 1914.

== Notable contributors ==
- Jesse Max Barber, editor
- Ferdinand Barnett, editor and owner
- John Edward Bruce, Washington correspondent
- Alexander Clark, editor and owner
- Monroe Alpheus Majors, editor
- Ida B. Wells, writer, editor and owner
