= Washington Bee =

1882–1922 American newspaper

The Washington Bee
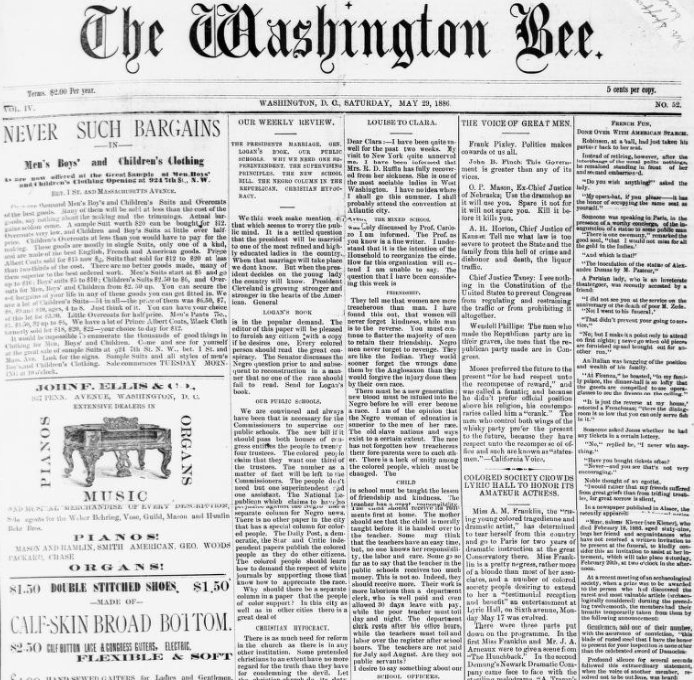
- The Washington Bee – May 29, 1886
- Type: Weekly newspaper
- Format: Broadsheet
- Owner: Bee Publishing Company
- Publisher: Bee Publishing Company
- Editor: William Calvin Chase
- Founded: June 3, 1882
- Ceased publication: January 21, 1922
- Language: American English
- Headquarters: 1109 I Street, NW; Washington, D.C. 20005
- Country: United States
- ISSN: 1940-7424
- OCLC number: 10587828

The Washington Bee was a Washington, D.C.–based American weekly newspaper founded in 1882 and primarily read by African Americans. Throughout almost all of its forty-year history, it was edited by African American lawyer-journalist William Calvin Chase. The newspaper was aligned with the Republican Party. It was published, with gaps in 1893 and 1895, until 1922, shortly after editor Chase's death.

== History ==
=== 1882–1922 weekly ===
The Bee's publication history overlapped with a two-generation period of American history during which the political roles of African Americans were sharply constrained by the politically reactionary Redeemers. Successful professional-level African Americans, such as editor Chase, faced ceaseless political battles in order to hold on to the limited gains made in previous generations. Chase's editorials at first criticized accommodationist black leaders such as Booker T. Washington, but later made peace with the influential Tuskegee leader. The Bee shared the Washington, D.C. market with a rival weekly, the Colored American, and Washington's private papers indicate that he and his network provided financial support to both news sheets.

The Bee's nameplate slogan was "Sting for Our Enemies – Honey for Our Friends", and according to the Library of Congress, "the Bee represented the Republican attitudes of its editor, although Chase did not hesitate to criticize Republican Party leaders when he thought they were on the wrong side of an issue."

The Bee′s circulation numbers are unknown but were never large; the highest figure given is 9,700 in 1922. That was the year the Bee ceased publication, unable to survive the death of its editor in 1921.

Other contemporaneous papers that served a similar demographic clientele included the Colored American, Grit, People's Advocate, Washington American, and Washington Eagle. There were nearly 75 other historical newspapers in the District of Columbia.

=== Layout and price ===
The Washington Bee was a six-column broadsheet, typical of the newspapers of its day. An issue from May 1886, illustrated here, depicts the weekly's typical layout. At least two front-page columns were devoted to display and classified advertising, with much of the remaining four columns used for brief references and updates about continuing news stories with which it was assumed that newspaper subscribers would already be familiar. In May 1886, the Bee was priced at five cents for a single issue, with a subscription costing $2 a year.

The Bee′s acceptance of advertising necessitated active acceptance of the overall social customs of its day, including residential segregation. For example, in a June 1893 display advertisement, developers in Bowie, Maryland, touted what they called:

The first opportunity offered colored people to secure Homes on Weekly payments of 50 cents a week or Two Dollars per month – 1000 Lots For Sale – In the city of Bowie, State of Maryland. Only 20 minutes ride from Washington. Double track. 22 trains stop daily. Fare to and from Washington, only Six cents by commutation ticket.

=== National influence ===
Even though African American residents of Washington did not have a formal voice in national affairs, as the District of Columbia lacked congressional representation and votes in the presidential Electoral College, Chase and the Bee could speak out informally; and the Library of Congress believes that the Bee was "one of the most influential African American newspapers in the country."

The Bee wielded its influence through carefully worded editorial content. This is an extract from a newspaper editorial published in March 1912, celebrating the appointment of Mahlon Pitney to the Supreme Court of the United States:

The appointment of Chancellor Mahlon Pitney, of New Jersey, as Associate Justice of the Supreme Court, to succeed the late Justice Harlan, is well received by all classes of our citizens. He is given a 'clean bill of health' by the colored New Jerseyites at the Capital, and is said to be a jurist and statesman of lofty character and attainments. The appointment of a man of the type of Justice Pitney is all the more welcome because it marked the defeat of Judge W.C. Hook, who, until the exposure of his record in the 'jim-crow' car cases, had the position practically within his grasp. The rejection of Hook illustrates the power of judicious protest, as the colored people, and many white citizens, literally bombarded the White House with objections to the misguided Kansan, until his designation became impossible. Justice Pitney enters upon his career with the best wishes of the colored people of the nation.

=== Typical coverage ===
The Washington Bee would sometimes accord significant coverage to news stories involving crime, including criminal acts that did not involve the African American community. Examples include a June 1893 Bee "lede", or lead paragraph, describing the Lizzie Borden case:

The trial of one of the most sensational murder cases of modern times began on Monday at Fall River, Mass. Lizzie Borden, a young woman of 27 years, is held to answer for the murder of her father, Andrew J. Borden, 68 years of age, and her step-mother, Mrs. Abbie Borden, her father's second wife. The tragedy was inexpressibly fiendish and bloody. Both victims were killed by blows of a hatchet or axe, and were terribly mutilated by repeated blows.

== Current status ==
The Library of Congress has archived issues of the Bee from August 2, 1884, onward until the cessation of publication in 1922. Another source is the Genealogy bank.

== See also ==
- The Afro-American Newspaper
- List of newspapers in Washington, D.C.
- Newspapers founded in Washington, D.C. during the 18th- and 19th-centuries
