= W. Allison Sweeney =

American journalist and poet (1851–1921)

William Allison Sweeney
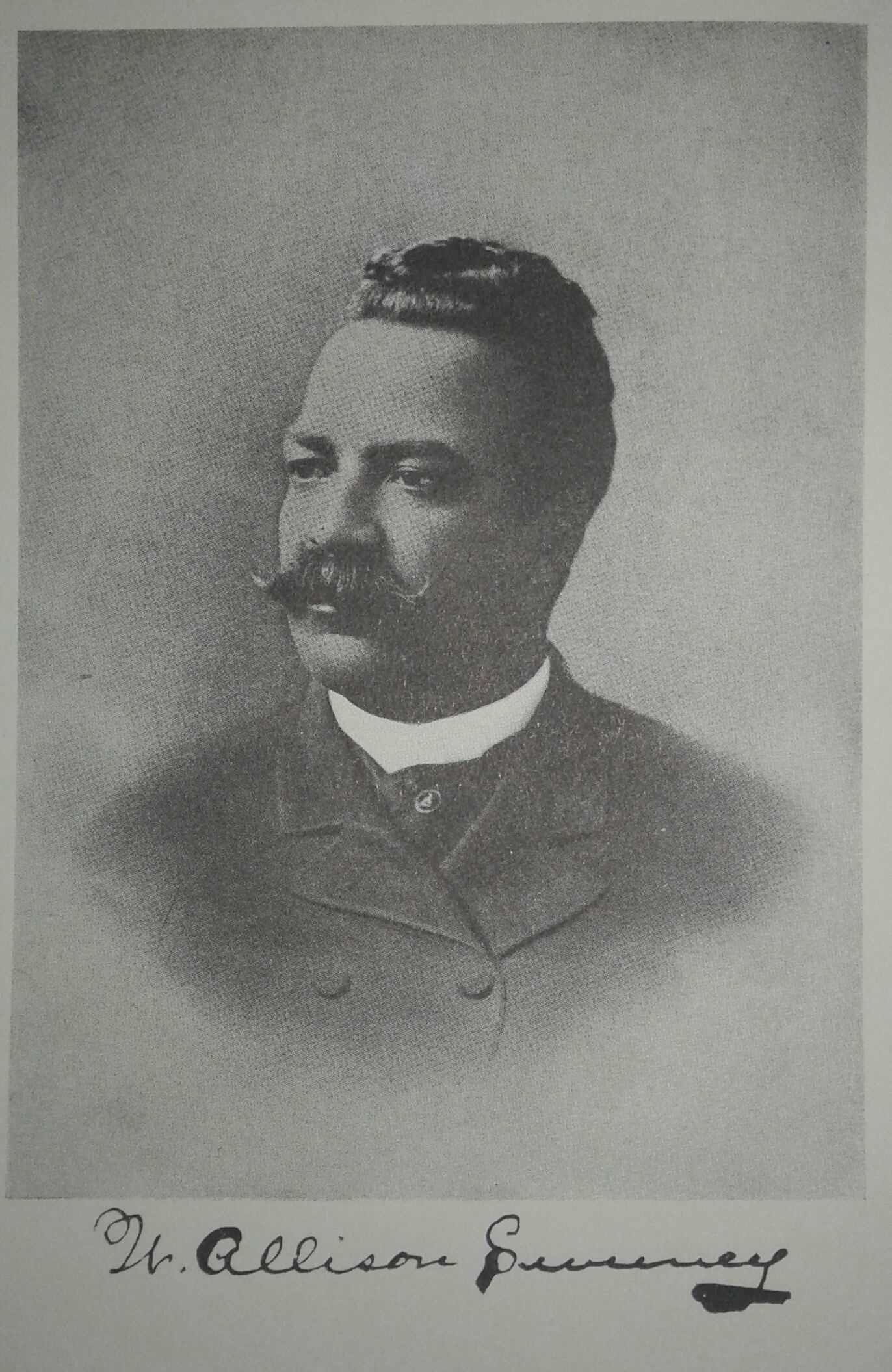
- Born: July 27, 1851; Superior, Washtenaw County, Michigan
- Died: 1921 (aged 69–70)
- Occupation: Newspaper editor
- Known for: Nonfiction book; poems

William Allison Sweeney (July 27, 1851 – 1921) was an American newspaper writer, editor, and owner, poet, and author of a history of Afro-American soldiers in World War I.

== Early life ==
Sweeney was born in Superior Township, Washtenaw County, Michigan, on July 27, 1851, to William Jacob and Aurilla (Day) Sweeney. He was married twice. He was first married to Rene Clark, with whom he had two children; and then second to Roberta Lomax Erskine. He died in 1921.

Sweeney was primarily known as a newspaper man. His career began in 1879. He contributed to both black and to white newspapers; an example of the latter is The Herald, in Indianapolis. He edited and published The People (Wheeling West Virginia, 1885–6), The National People (Detroit, 1886–7); was editor and manager of The Freeman (Indianapolis, 1890–8); and editor and part owner, Chicago Leader (1905–6). At The Freeman, Sweeney was associated with R. W. Thompson, who would later suggest to Booker T. Washington that Sweeney's work at The Chicago Conservator receive a subsidy from Washington to support its continued publication.

Sweeney's most famous newspaper association was as editor of the Chicago Conservator. The Conservator was in the center of a political power struggle whose sides were associated with W. E. B. Du Bois and Booker T. Washington. Sweeney was in the Washington camp and became editor of the Conservator in 1904. Sweeney exhibited some ineptness as a manager and businessman while there, as he often missed publication dates for considerable periods of a time.

As a poet, Sweeney was considered to be one of the "Chicago poets" and thought to have written the first poem by a black man employing the technique of free verse. The list of poems below is from Mather.

Sweeney was the first black to serve on a jury in West Virginia (1885).

== Criticism ==
While Sweeney has been called "the 'dean' of the Chicago press corps", who was "idolized by younger journalists", his "essays full of impassioned pleas and profuse in flowery language" can be seen to epitomize "a departing style of black journalism that was giving way to modern techniques of reporting the rising commodity of race news".

== Works ==
=== Books ===
- History of the American Negro in the Great World War: His Splendid Record in the Battle Zones of Europe, Including a Resume of His Past Services to His Country in the Wars of the Revolution, of 1812, the War of the Rebellion, the Indian Wars on the Frontier, the Spanish–American War, and the Late Imbroglio with Mexico (1919)

=== Poems ===
- "The Other Fellow's Burden"
- "A Certain American Beauty at the President's Levee"
- "A Name among the Princely Few"
- "Baby"
- "Lincoln"
- "No Chance for the Negro?"
