= Edward Elder Cooper =

American newspaper publisher (1859-1908)

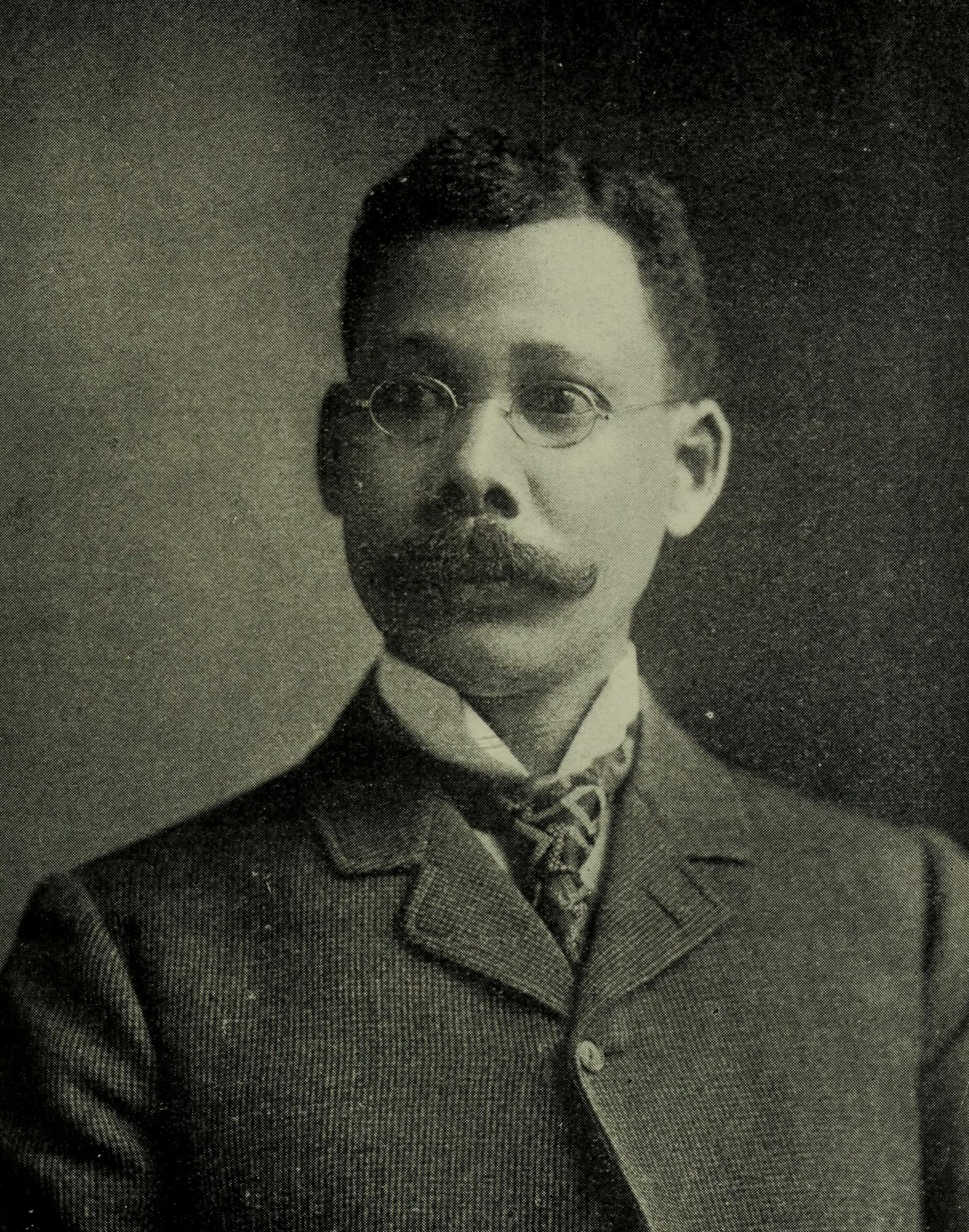
Edward E. Cooper

Edward Elder Cooper (1859–1908) was an American newspaper publisher. He was a prominent early black publisher in the United States.

He was born into slavery on June 10, 1859, in Duval County, Florida. Cooper was the publisher of the Indianapolis Freeman, starting in July 1888, then sold it in 1892.

Cooper then launched The Colored American in Washington, D.C. starting in 1893. Cooper allied the newspaper with Booker T. Washington, Mary Church Terrell, and generally with the Republican Party. He was a member of the National Negro Business League. The newspaper fell into debt and shut down in 1904.

He died at the age of 49 on July 9, 1908.
