= Freeman H. M. Murray =

Civil rights activist, and journalist in Washington D.C

Freeman Henry Morris Murray
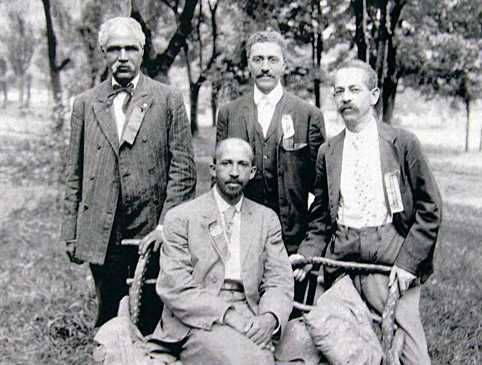
- Niagara Movement leaders W. E. B. Du Bois (seated), and (left to right) J. R. Clifford (who organized the 2nd meeting), Lafayette M. Hershaw, and F. H. M. Murray at Harpers Ferry.
- Born: September 22, 1859; Cleveland, Ohio, U.S.
- Died: February 20, 1950 (aged 90); Alexandria, Virginia, U.S.
- Education: Mount Pleasant Academy, Howard University
- Occupations: Journalist, Real Estate, Clerk
- Spouse(s): Laura Hamilton, Delilah

Freeman H. M. Murray (September 22, 1859 - February 20, 1950) was an intellectual, civil rights activist, and journalist in Washington D.C. and Alexandria, Virginia. He was active in promoting black home-ownership, opposing Jim Crow laws and lynching, and supporting positive representation of African Americans in public art. He was a founding member of the Niagara Movement and was an editor of its journal, the Horizon, along with W. E. B. Du Bois and Lafayette M. Hershaw. Alongside his other work, Murray was an important intellectual leader and wrote an influential book of art criticism. In this, Murray was one of the first historians of African American art. His work expressed a desire that art take seriously the representation of African Americans and that slavery not be overlooked in favor of representation of heroes and glory in public art.

== Personal life ==
Freeman Henry Morris Murray was born September 22, 1859, in Cleveland, Ohio. His father was John M. Murray and was of Scottish descent and was disowned by his family for marrying a black woman. John was a member of the 12th Ohio Infantry in the US Civil War and died at Bull Run Bridge on August 27, 1862, in the preamble to the Second Battle of Bull Run. His mother was Martha Bently, whose father was Irish and mother was Native American and African American. The couple owned a tailoring business in Cleveland. After his father died, his mother moved the family to Cincinnati, Ohio. After primary school, Murray attended Mount Pleasant Academy to train to be a teacher, one of three black students. He graduated from the academy in 1875. Murray was a bibliophile and learned French and Latin while continuing to work with his mother's father, Daniel Bentley in his whitewashing and painting business. Daniel Bentley was a major inspiration for Murray, having run a station on the Underground Railroad during the time of slavery and continuing to work for African American progress after the civil war. Soon, Murray moved to Covington, Kentucky, to take a job teaching. He also took an apprenticeship for the Cincinnati Enquirer where he gained editing and publishing experience. Later in life he studied at Howard University in Washington, DC and eventually learned five languages.

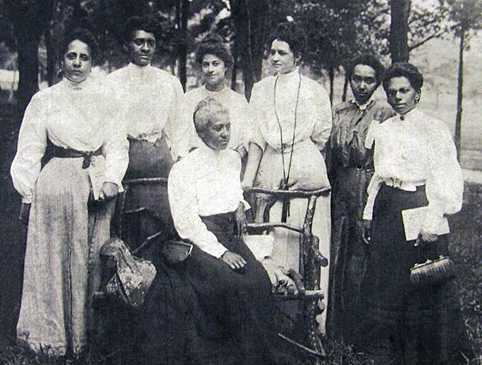
Women at the 1906 Niagara Movement Conference at Harpers Ferry: Mrs. Gertrude Wright Morgan (seated) and (left to right) Mrs. O.M. Waller, Mrs. F.H.M. Murray, Mrs. Mollie Lewis Kelan, Mrs. Ida D. Bailey, Miss Sadie Shorter, and Mrs. Charlotte Hershaw.

In 1883, Murray married Laura Hamilton. They had five children. One daughter, Kathleen Paige Murray, worked for the Niagara Movement. In 1898 his daughter, Mary Vivian, and his wife died of tuberculosis. On September 1, 1898, Murray married his live-in nanny and mistress, Delilah - who was a cousin of Laura. They had one daughter, Florence Rogers. Murray had at least two other daughters, Kathleen (Luckett) and Florence, and two sons, F. Morris and William M. Freeman H. M. Murray was struck by a car driven by prominent Alexandria doctor William Allen Fuller, and died two days later on February 20, 1950, in Washington, DC.

== Move to Washington, D.C. ==
In 1884, Murray passed the civil service exam in Ohio and moved to the Washington, DC area where he was appointed to a position in the Pension Division of the War Department, making him the first black person from Ohio to be appointed to a federal position. Murray moved to Alexandria, Virginia, where he started a real estate business. He purchased a large manor house which he considered a "post Civil War Underground Railroad System", as a safe house for African Americans at risk of persecution and lynching. With his brother, John, he created the Murray Brothers Printers and Publishing Company.

Murray was very active in African-American politics and activism. He worked with Frederick Douglass, Ida B. Wells, Lafayette M Hershaw, James M Waldron, William Monroe Trotter, and W. E. B. Du Bois. Murray was particularly active working with Wells to fight lynching. After Douglass died, Murray became caretaker of the Frederick Douglass Memorial Cemetery. Murray frequently wrote and spoke in opposition to Booker T. Washington, questioning Washington's strategies for failing to recognize the radical nature of the change needed.

In April 1890, W. B. Dulaney, Rev. R. H. Porter, William Gray, and Murray formed the New Era Building Association to aid blacks to purchase homes and invest savings. In December 1891, Murray, Rev. H. H. Warring and Rev. Porter were elected by a group of Alexandria blacks to oppose segregated coach laws before the Virginia Legislature in Richmond.

Murray ran a newspaper called the Home News and was Washington correspondent for Trotter's Boston Guardian, as well as writing for many other newspapers and journals. Murray started the Journal, the Home News, which was co-edited by Edward Hill, in 1901. Murray's position at the Guardian begane in January 1909. In the 1910s, Murray was an officer for the American Negro Academy. He also founded another paper, the Washington Tribune.

== The Niagara Movement ==
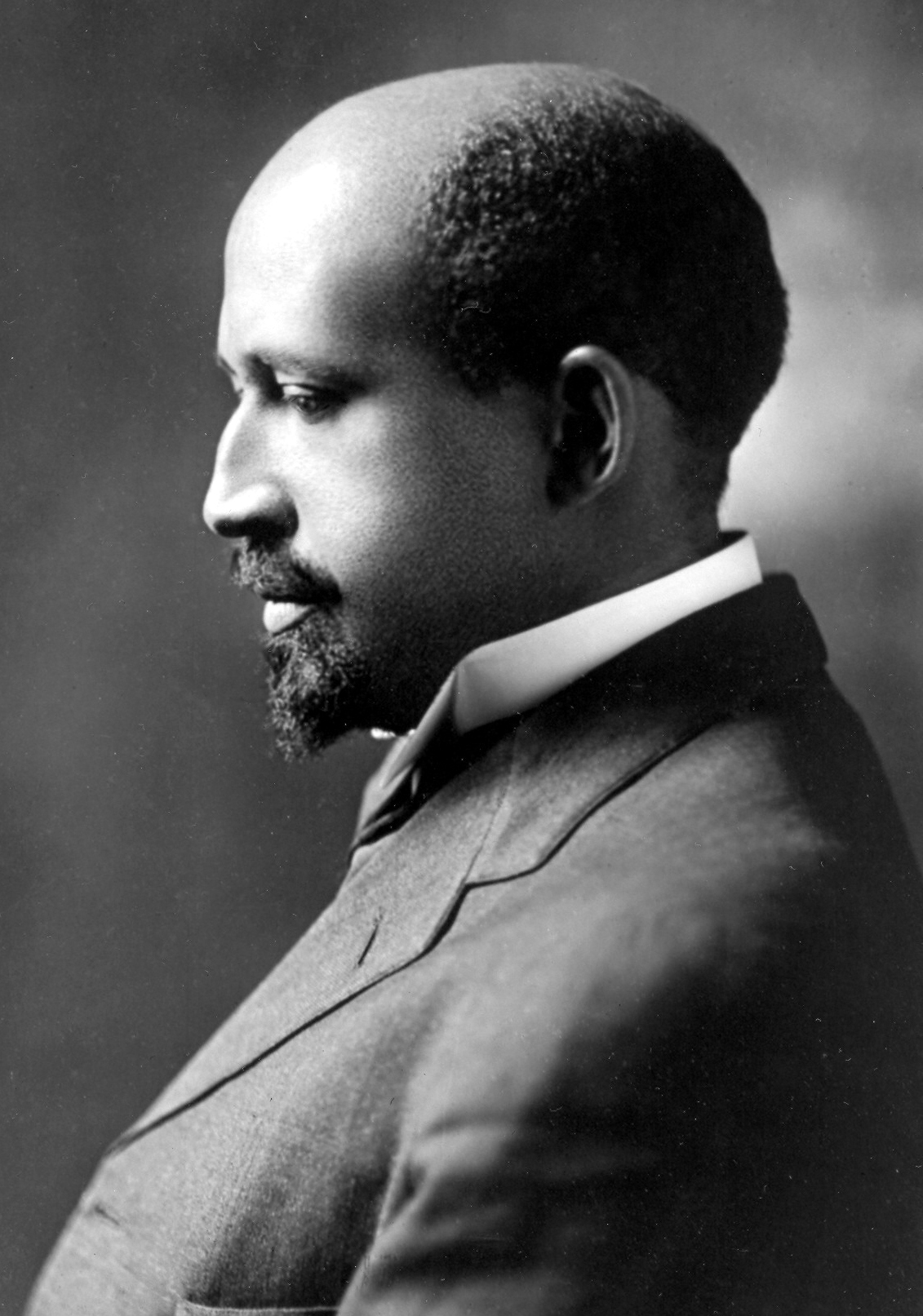
W. E. B. Du Bois c. 1911

Murray was a founding member of the Niagara Movement, founded by W. E. B. Du Bois in 1906. He was a prominent member of the movement, giving the opening address at the second national meeting of the group in August 1906 at Harpers Ferry. The Niagara Movement was a forerunner of the N.A.A.C.P.

In 1907 Murray and others were rallying opposition to Booker T. Washington's Tuskegee Institute and Theodore Roosevelt in the black press. Washington sent his assistant, New York Customs Agent Charles W. Anderson to suggest action against the radicals to Roosevelt. Anderson opposed the idea of Niagara movement members holding federal jobs and succeeded at convincing President Roosevelt that Murray should be demoted.

=== The Horizon ===
In order to publicize the views of the Niagara Movement, Du Bois, Hershaw, and F. H. M. Murray began publication of the magazine, "The Horizon". The journal was published from 1907 to 1910; Murray was printer and Du Bois and Hershaw were co-editors W. M. Sinclair and William Monroe Trotter were noted as other key players in the movement and involved in the magazine. Hershaw's most frequent contribution to Horizon was a column called "The Out-Look", a view of the black experience from the perspective of the white world, while Murray contributed "The In-Look" about the black experience from the view of black and the black press and Du Bois wrote "The Over-Look" about any issue in the black experience he felt necessary. Murray's "the In-Look" often criticized less radical positions of Booker T. Washington and his followers. The paper was not always in perfect harmony, and Hershaw and Murray frequently fought over material to be included in the "Horizon". In 1908, Du Bois, Hershaw, Clement G. Morgan, W. H. Ferris, and Kelly Miller broke with Trotter; and Trotter left the journal and the movement. Seeking greater radicalism, Trotter created the Negro American Political League.

== Art history ==
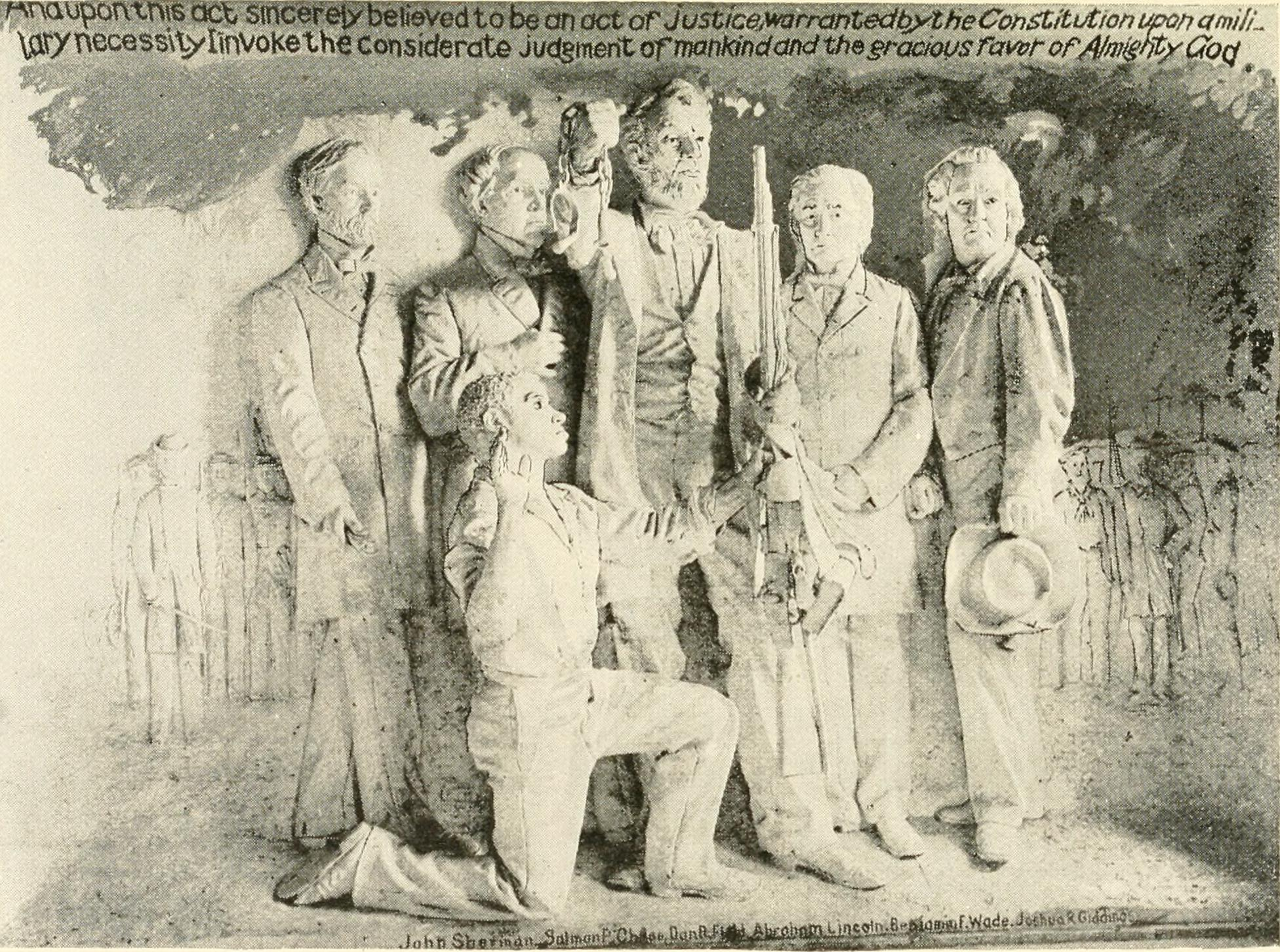
In Levi Scofield's Panel "Emancipation" of his Cuyahoga County Soldiers' and Sailors' Monument, Murray notes with appreciation the power behind the emancipated man's central position, grasp of a musket, and arm upraised to take the soldiers oath

He wrote an influential book, Emancipation and the Freed American in Sculpture in 1916 where he discussed the role of African Americans in sculpture. Murray advocated advances in African American culture and art. Murray's book was concerned with the tendency of sculptures celebrating emancipation focusing on its heroes and great battles, and that they would tend to overlook slavery, thereby lessening its role in the national consciousness. This concern with the politics of representation and memory of slavery and black history has influenced many 20th and 21st century scholars.

== Later in life ==
Later in his life he organized and directed the Alexandria Dramatic Club. He also was a religious leader and educator in Alexandria. He was the head of the primary Sunday School of Roberts Chapel Methodist Church, where he also taught.
