= The Colored American (Washington, D.C.) =

African American newspaper (1893–1904)

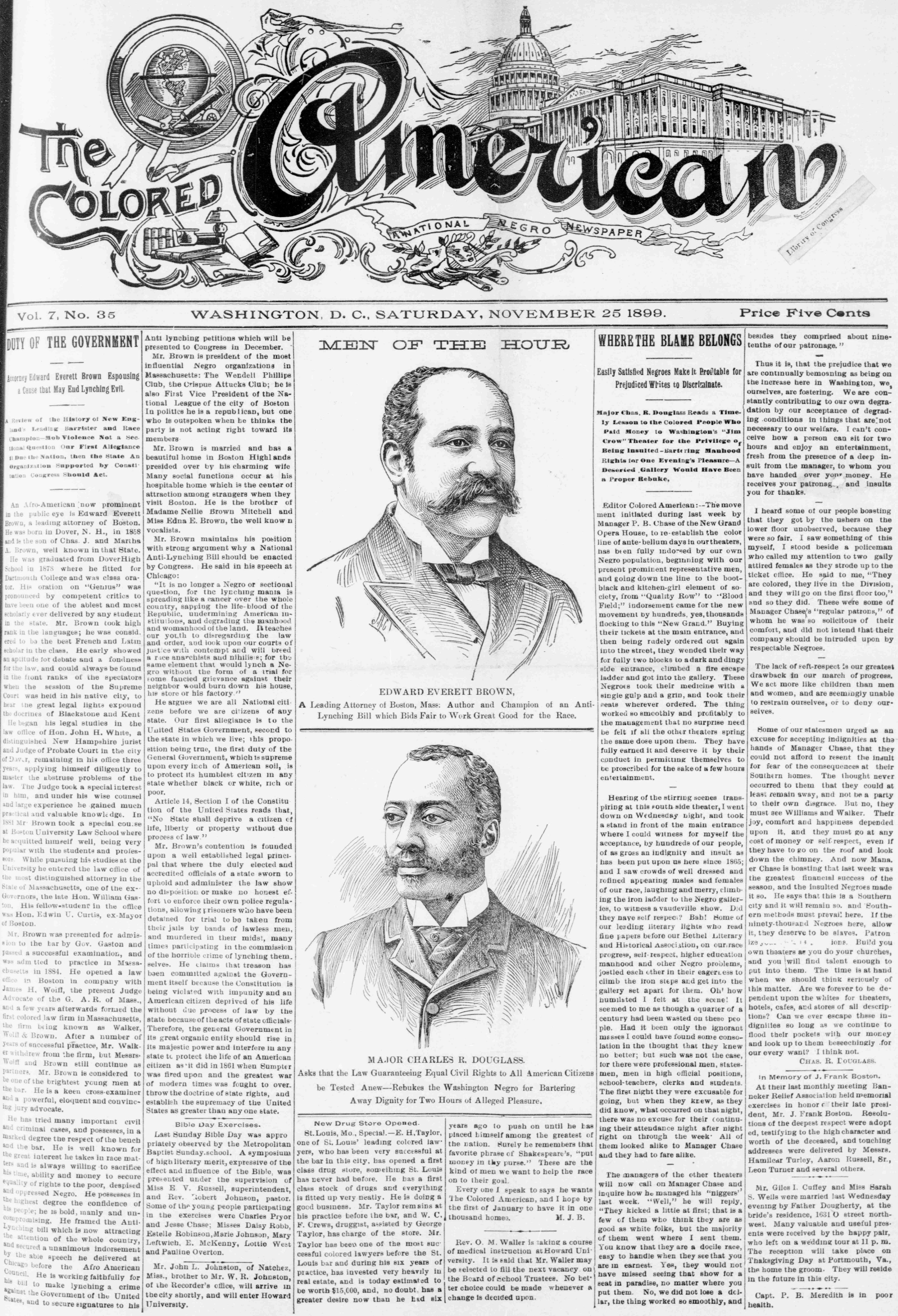
- Front page of the November 25, 1899 edition
- Type: Weekly newspaper
- Format: Tabloid
- Publisher: Edward Elder Cooper
- Founded: 1893
- Language: English
- Ceased publication: 1904
- Headquarters: Washington, D.C.

The Colored American was a weekly newspaper published in Washington, D.C., from 1893 to 1904 by Edward Elder Cooper. It frequently featured the works of journalists John Edward Bruce and Richard W. Thompson.

The weekly publication promoted itself as "A National Negro Newspaper." It had stories on the achievements of African Americans across the United States, often with more original reporting than other newspapers, which frequently copied one another. Prominent black journalists contributed to the Colored American. An annual subscription cost $2.00.

The paper took editorial positions in favor of expanded rights and better conditions for blacks, and generally supported Republicans. It tended to ally with the positions of Booker T. Washington, who may have offered financial support. Civil rights advocate and lecturer Mary Church Terrell gave financial support and wrote a column for the paper.

Partly because of debts, the publication ceased in November 1904.

== See also ==
- The Rights of All
- Freedom's Journal
- Newspapers founded in Washington, D.C. during the 18th- and 19th-centuries

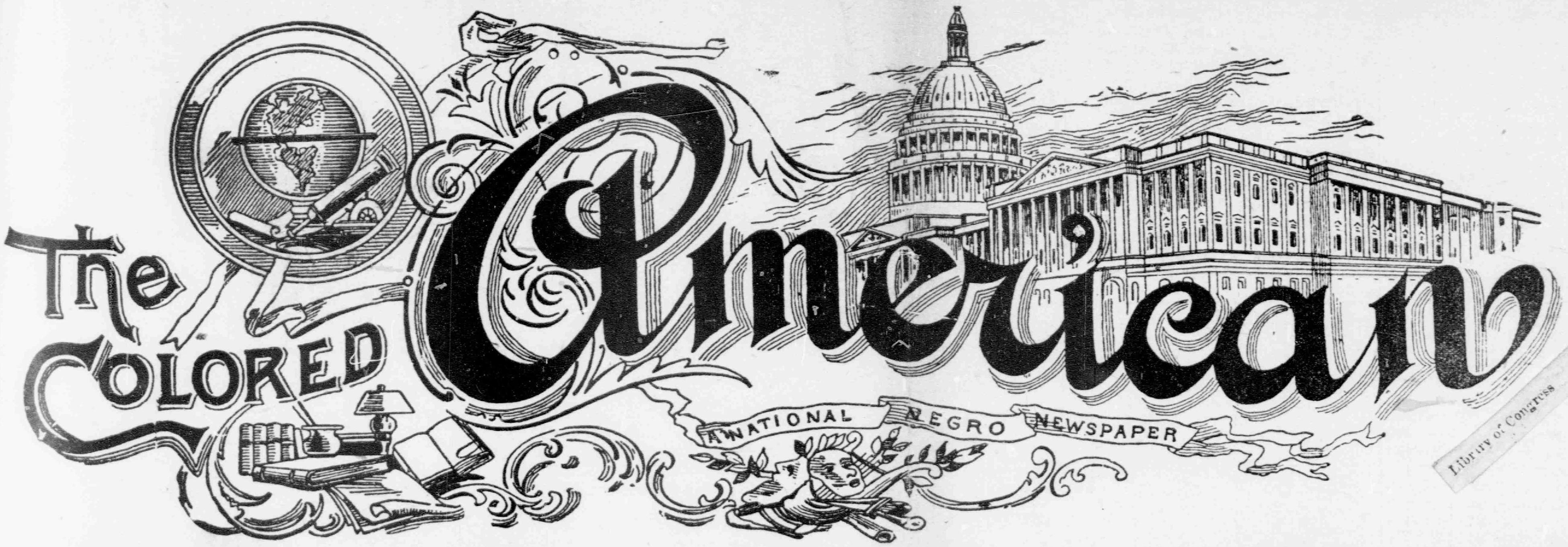
The Colored American newspaper nameplate in 1899
