= Washington Union =

Washington Union may refer to:

- The Washington Union, defunct 1850s newspaper in Washington, D.C.
- The Washington Weekly Union, defunct 1850s newspaper in Washington, D.C.
- Washington Union Station, train station, transportation hub, and leisure destination in Washington, D.C.
  - Union Station (Washington Metro), Metro station in Washington, D.C., serving Washington Union Station
- Washington Theological Union, Roman Catholic graduate school of theology and seminary in Washington, D.C.
- Washington Union High School, founded in 1892 in the rural community of Easton in Fresno County, California

== See also ==
- Union, Washington, census-designated place in Mason County, Washington
- Washington Township, Union County, Ohio
- Union Station (Tacoma, Washington)
