= Earl Godwin (radio newsman) =

Radio newscaster

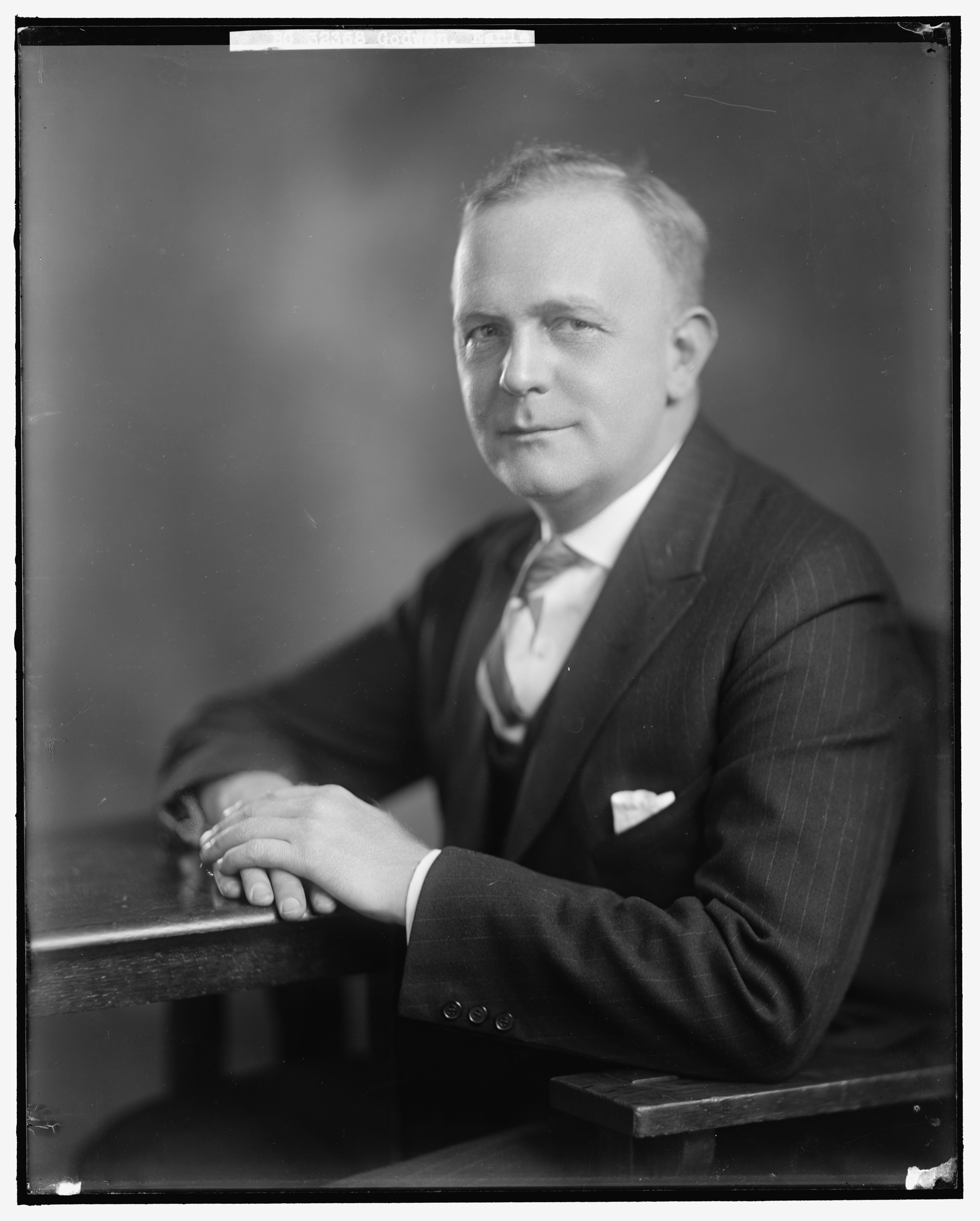
- Born: Earl Thomas J. Godwin; January 24, 1881; Washington, D.C., U.S.
- Died: September 23, 1956 (aged 75); Rehoboth Beach, Delaware, U.S.
- Occupation: News journalist

Earl Godwin (January 24, 1881 – September 23, 1956) was a prominent 20th century newsman and radio personality. After a successful career as a print journalist and editor, he became one of the leading newscasters and commentators of the Golden Age of Radio, attracting a nationwide audience. He was elected president of the White House Correspondents' Association, an influential group of journalists that still exists today with special access to the White House, and also served as president of the Radio Correspondents' Association. Dubbed the "Earl of Godwin" by President Franklin D. Roosevelt, he was referred to as the "Dean of Broadcasters." Godwin has a star on the Hollywood Walk of Fame.

== Early life ==
Earl Godwin was born in a house across the street from the U.S. Capitol in Washington, D.C., on the site currently occupied by the U.S. Supreme Court. His father was Harry Godwin, city editor of the Washington Evening Star, his grandfather Henry fought in the Civil War, and his great grandfather was Abraham Godwin. Godwin attended school in Passaic, New Jersey and got his first job at the Passaic Herald, where he earned $3 a week. Years later he observed, "No amount of money seemed so great to me."

== Early career ==
Godwin cut his teeth at his father's newspaper (c. 1910). By 1916 he had become its political writer while simultaneously reporting on the nation's capital for other papers, first as a side venture for the Milwaukee Sentinel and subsequently for the rival Washington Times (1917–1919). This initial stint with the Times coincided with his joining the army in the First World War.

During the 1920s Godwin took a break from the newspaper business to serve as public relations director for the Chesapeake and Potomac Telephone Company and later (1927–35) for the Women's Christian Temperance Union (WCTU). In 1929 he authored a book about the phenomenon of Prohibition.

After this hiatus, Godwin returned to the Washington Times and rose to associate editor.

In 1938, while serving as White House correspondent for the Times, he was elected president of the White House Correspondents' Association.

== Two decades in radio ==
Godwin broke into radio in 1936 at the age of 55 almost without trying: he was sent to a radio station to be interviewed on the air about a particular topic and was called back repeatedly until he became a regular. A participant in more than half a dozen weekly news roundups as well as special coverage of seminal events such as the bombing of Pearl Harbor and the Senator Joseph McCarthy hearings, his most notable syndicated series were Earl Godwin and the News (straight newscasting, 1936–41, 1944–49) and Watch the World Go By (news analysis, 1942–44), both on the NBC Blue Network.

Godwin benefited greatly from arriving on the scene at a time when experienced Washington correspondents, skilled in reporting and analyzing national news, were supplanting the so-called armchair analysts who had been a popular feature of wartime coverage. Along with other authoritative voices such as Drew Pearson and Eric Sevareid, Godwin attracted larger and larger audiences as well as advertising dollars from major industries.

Watch the World Go By was sponsored by Ford Motor Company. Godwin was chosen as the "Voice of Ford" to burnish the company's reputation while reaching the widest possible segment of the population. He was reportedly hand-picked by Henry Ford for his "raspy drawl."

Godwin was a singular presence, or something of an outlier, on the airwaves during an era when the majority of radio commentators leaned leftward on the political spectrum. Commenting on this phenomenon, Sen. Robert A. Taft (R-Ohio) complained to Mark Woods, the president of ABC (successor to the NBC Blue Network), in 1946:

I quite agree ... that these gentlemen [Orson Welles, Elmer Davis, Drew Pearson, Walter Winchell, and Mayor LaGuardia] are all very far on the left and that their matter is all pro-New Deal and anti-Republican. My correspondent states that Earl Godwin is the only conservative commentator, and he has only fifteen minutes on Thursday evening. It does seem to me that a national network has the responsibility for weighting its programs more or less impartially.

White House Press Secretary James Hagerty characterized Godwin as a "fine reporter." Reporter Richard Strout of the Christian Science Monitor remembered him as "genial," while Time magazine was less generous: "Bumbling Earl Godwin's sudden emergence as one of radio's high-priced newsmen is a triumph for corn. His reports from Washington for NBC have always sounded as if they were delivered from a cracker barrel near the stove in the general store." In spite of this unflattering assessment, Godwin remained popular with political types as well as ordinary citizens, as evidenced by the State of Texas awarding him an honorary citizenship.

Godwin would end his broadcasts with the phrase, "God bless you, one and all."

In the early days of television, Godwin co-hosted the NBC show Meet the Veep.

== Relationship with FDR ==
Although his career spanned several presidencies, stretching from coverage of the campaign of Woodrow Wilson (1912) to that of Dwight Eisenhower (1956), Godwin developed a particularly close relationship with President Franklin D. Roosevelt. It was all the more remarkable in light of their different politics, since Roosevelt was an unabashed liberal, while Godwin was a conservative whose employer, Cissie Patterson, owner of the Washington Times, detested the president.

FDR was fond of calling him the "Earl of Godwin" and Godwin responded by calling him "Chief." Godwin was given a seat near the presidential desk during White House press conferences. On occasion he was approached in advance and asked to pose a question that the president or his press secretary felt were too important not to be addressed, requests to which he willingly acceded:

To make sure that somebody asked about [a topic FDR deemed important], Roosevelt and his press secretary would plant questions. On April 24, 1935, [press secretary Steve] Early wrote in his diary that he told Earl Godwin of the Washington Times-Herald to "ask the President what part he personally is going to play in the administration on this work relief bill." During that morning's press conference, that question was one of the first asked. Roosevelt then launched into the subject with numerous proposals as well as a theoretical chart to explain the relationship between the news agencies and his projects. The planted question dominated the conference.

Godwin and the president enjoyed a genuine camaraderie and "bantering" relationship. He became so choked up when announcing FDR's death that a colleague had to step in and finish the broadcast.

== Legacy ==
In 1957, to commemorate his achievements and contributions to the network, NBC established the Earl Godwin Memorial Award and scholarship to promote excellence in journalism among students pursuing studies at an accredited school of journalism.

== Personal life ==
Godwin was married twice. His first marriage, to Mary Easton, ended in divorce. In 1938 he wed Elizabeth Cromelin, who, along with his three sons and one daughter, survived him. One of his sons was Harry Easton Godwin, a famous jazz musician.

== Quotes ==
"It is surprising to me to hear anybody say in this town that there are 40 or 50 different ways of violating a confidence. I only know of one way, and that is to violate it."

About his dealings with a New York financier: "I have a small account in his firm, and I have known him a long time, and he bought me some submarine stock that functioned properly and went to the bottom and stayed there."
