= Harry Easton Godwin =

American jazz historian (1907–1986)

Harry Easton Godwin (August 22, 1907 – May 27, 1986) was born in New Jersey and grew up in Chicago and Virginia. He saw many jazz musicians in his youth, including King Oliver, Baby Dodds, Kid Ory, and Louie Armstrong. in the 1950s, Godwin was asked to hire a collection of Jazz musicians for the Cotton Carnival. He hired Bukka White, Little Laura Dukes, Gus Cannon, Furry Lewis, and many more. He worked the festival into the 1980s. He worked his day job as a manufacturer's rep mainly to support his family and music. He collected stories, memorabilia, and taped interviews. He also wrote a few songs. He served as manager for Memphis Slim. Godwin had a radio show on WLYX (Rhodes College). His avocation made him a resource for historians and a hero for the city. He was recorded on two records with Louis Armstrong on February 20, 1965. Godwin gave the track to Armstrong.

Godwin wrote the song "My Memphis Baby".

He is the son of Earl Godwin.
