= Newspapers founded in Washington, D.C., during the 18th and 19th centuries =

More than 405 newspapers were founded in Washington, D.C., during the 18th and 19th centuries. They included daily, weekly, and monthly newspapers, mostly published in English, with a few in German and one in French. Many reported on news of national government affairs, since Washington, D.C., is the capital seat of the United States of America. Thomas Jefferson helped establish some of the early newspapers. During the American Civil War, some newspapers were founded and published in military camps and hospitals within Washington, D.C., including Brookland, Tenleytown, Carver General Hospital, Finley General Hospital, Armory Square Hospital, and Kalorama. Most of these newspapers ceased publication before 1900, but a few survived to the 20th century, including the Evening Star, and at least one to the 21st century: The Washington Post.

== Newspapers by founding date ==
=== 1700s ===
Georgetown, originally part of the state of Maryland, was the first populated place in Washington, D.C. The first newspapers appeared in Georgetown, which became an independently municipal government within the District of Columbia, along with the City of Washington, the City of Alexandria (retroceeded to Virginia in 1846), and the newly created County of Washington and County of Alexandria (retroceded to Virginia in 1847, now Arlington County, Virginia). See Defunct newspapers of Virginia for newspapers that were part of the District and then became part of Virginia.

Washington, D.C., newspapers founded in the 1700s
Newspaper title	Place of pub.	Founded	Ended	Language	Publishers	OCLC or ISSN reference
The Times, and Patowmack Packet	Georgetown	1789	1791	English	Charles Fierer (1789), Charles Fierer & Thomas U. Fosdick (1790-1791)	OCLC 13105200, OCLC 9278804, ISSN 2640-8570
The George-town Weekly Ledger	Georgetown	1790	1793	English	M.Day and Hancock (1791), Alexander Doyle (1792); James Doyle (1792)	OCLC 9275216
The Columbian Chronicle	Georgetown	1793	1796	English	Hanson & Briggs (1794), Hanson & Priestley (1795), Samuel Hanson (1795-1796)	OCLC 9274508
Impartial Observer and Washington Advertiser	Washington, D.C.	1795	1796	English	Thomas Wilson	OCLC 9275292
The Washington Advertiser	Washington, D.C.	1796	179?	English	John Crocker & Co.	OCLC 13149491
The Washington Gazette	Washington, D.C.	1796	1798	English	Benjamin More	OCLC 9285559
The Centinel of Liberty and George-town Advertiser	Georgetown	1796	1798	English	Green, English & Co.	OCLC 12982954, ISSN 2638-9924
The Centinel & Country Gazette	Georgetown	1796	1800	English	Green, English & Co; Editor: Samuel Hanson (1796-1799)	OCLC 12963771
The Centinel of Liberty and George-town and Washington Advertiser	Georgetown	1799	1799	English	Green, English & Co.; Editor: Samuel Hanson	OCLC 12985745
The Centinel of Liberty or George-town and Washington Advertiser	Georgetown	1799	1800	English	Green, English & Co.	OCLC 9274448

=== 1800–1829 ===
Between 1800 and 1829, 68 newspapers were founded in the area that is now Washington, D.C. All of these newspapers ceased printing by 1891.

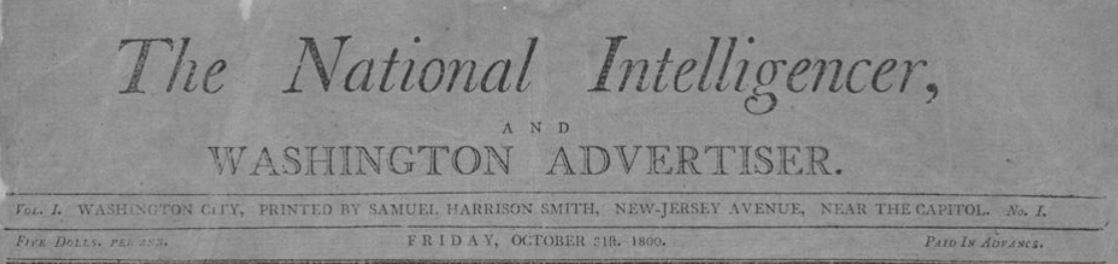
National Intelligencer and Washington Advertiser, 1800–1810

Washington, D.C. newspapers founded 1800–1829
Newspaper Title	Place of pub.	Founded	Ended	Language	Publishers	OCLC Reference
The Cabinet	Georgetown	1800	1801	English	J. Lyon	OCLC 8769556
Boyce's Saturday Anvil	Washington, D.C.	18??	18??	English	S. Boyce	OCLC 31909072
The National Citizen Soldier	Washington, D.C.	18??	1881	English	Citizen and Soldier Pub. Co.	OCLC 27163306
The National Intelligencer and Washington Advertiser	Washington, D.C.	1800	1810	English	Samuel Harrison Smith (1800–); Joseph Gales (1810)	OCLC 123124568, ISSN 2474-4344
The Museum and Washington and George-town Advertiser	Georgetown	1800	1802	English	Green & English, 1800–	OCLC 13016258
The Museum and Washington and George-town Daily Advertiser	Georgetown	1800	1800	English	Green & English, 1800	OCLC 9287461
The People	Washington, D.C.	18??	1???	English	Central Council of the Labor League	OCLC 19568688
Soldiers' National Free Press	Washington, D.C.	18??	????	English	John W. Hall	OCLC 11753086
True Blue	Washington, D.C.	18??	18??	English	unknown	OCLC 12270298
Washington Advertiser	Washington, D.C.	1800	1800	English	Brown & Snowden, 1800	OCLC 13149555
The Washington City Gazette	Washington, D.C.	1800	1800	English	Charles Cist, 1800	OCLC 13478188
Washington Federalist	Georgetown	1800	180?	English	William Alexander Rind and John Stewart, 1800–1809	OCLC 122959981, ISSN 2688-3252
The Washington Post	Washington, D.C.	18??	????	English	unknown	OCLC 12270551
Washington Republican	Washington, D.C.	18??	1824	English	James C. Dunn, and Co.	OCLC 9301170
The Sunday Capital	Washington, D.C.	18??	1890	English	Washington Critic Co.	OCLC 8798941
The Sunday Gazette	Washington, D.C.	18??	1891	English	T. G. Morrow	OCLC 8821760
The Church News	Washington, D.C.	18??	18??	English	Church News Pub. Co. (Catholic)	OCLC 31909096
The Apollo	Washington, D.C.	1802	1802	English	W. Duane & Son, 1802	OCLC 14291840
The Olio	Georgetown	1802	1803	English	Parks & Co., 1802–	OCLC 8786515
American Literary Advertiser	Washington, D.C.	1802	1804	English	James Lyon and Richard Dinmore	OCLC 13615170
Columbian Repository	Washington, D.C.	1803	1804	English	Bradford & Burgess	OCLC 30696682
Atlantic World	Washington, D.C.	1807	1807	English	John Wood & Thomas W. White, 1807–	OCLC 8786390
Washington Expositor and Weekly Register	Washington, D.C.	1807	1807	English	Unknown	OCLC 10618589, ISSN 2640-723X
The Monitor	Washington, D.C.	1808	1809	English	J. B. Colvin, 1808–1809	OCLC 8769686
The Washington Expositor	Washington, D.C.	1808	1809	English	Dinmore & Cooper, 1808–1809	OCLC 19969779
Independent American and Columbian Advertiser	Georgetown	1809	1809	English	Edgar Patterson	OCLC 10190723
Independent American	Georgetown	1809	18??	English	E. Patterson, 1809–	OCLC 9278179
Museum; Georgetown advertiser	Georgetown	1809	180?	English	W. Rind Jr., 1809–	OCLC 8774879
National Intelligencer	Washington, D.C.	1810	1869	English	Gales and Seaton (1814–1860)	OCLC 10202373
The Courier	Georgetown	1812	1812	English	B. Parks (1812)	OCLC 10788707
Federal Republican	Georgetown	1813	1816	English	A. C. Hanson and J. Wagner (1813-1816)	OCLC 9343111
Daily National Intelligencer	Washington, D.C.	1813	1869	English	Gales & Seaton, 1813–	OCLC 2260099, ISSN 2641-1989
Federal Republican	Georgetown	1814	1816	English	A. C. Hanson & J. Wagner (1816)	OCLC 11525794
The Senator	Washington, D.C.	1814	1814	English	E. H. Cummins, 1814	OCLC 10788786, ISSN 2574-7142
Washington City Gazette	Washington, D.C.	1814	1814	English	William Elliot	OCLC 13478591
Washington City Weekly Gazette	Washington, D.C.	1815	1817	English	Jonathan Elliot, 1815–1817	OCLC 7932384, ISSN 2574-3910
The Messenger	Georgetown	1816	1817	English	James C. Dunn & Co.	OCLC 9278253
National Messenger	Georgetown	1817	1821	English	James C. Dunn & Co., 1817-1821	OCLC 8771618
City of Washington Gazette	Washington, D.C.	1817	1821	English	J. Elliot (1817–1821)	OCLC 9337841
The Columbian, District Advertiser and Commercial Gazette	Georgetown	182?	1829	English	Samuel S. Rind	OCLC 14210980
The Metropolitan	Georgetown	1820	18??	English	W. A. Rind Jr.	OCLC 8786357
Metropolitan	Georgetown	1820	1827	English	OCLC 4770002	
Washington Gazette	Washington, D.C.	1821	1826	English	Elliot and Irvine	OCLC 8807720, ISSN 2574-3902
The Columbian Star	Washington, D.C.	1822	1829	English	Anderson & Meehan, (1822-1829); author: Baptist General Convention for Foreign Missions (U.S.)	OCLC 1564271, ISSN 2158-6357
National Observer	Washington, D.C.	1822	18??	English	B. Irvine & Co., 1822–	OCLC 11760469
Washington Republican and Congressional Examiner	Washington, D.C.	1822	1824	English	Published for the Proprietor by James C. Dunn, & Co., 1822-1824	OCLC 8776494
Washington Republican and Congressional Examiner	Washington, D.C.	1822	18??	English	J. C. Dunn & Co., 1822-	OCLC 8808699
National Journal	Washington, D.C.	1823	1832	English	Peter Force, 1823-	OCLC 9311731
National Palladium and Congressional Register	Washington, D.C.	1823	182?	English	James Wilson (1823–)	OCLC 13287366
National Palladium	Washington, D.C.	1823	1823	English	J. Wilson (–1823)	OCLC 8770197
Daily National Journal	Washington, D.C.	1824	1832	English	P. Force (1824–1832)	OCLC 9522695, ISSN 2641-1970
The Columbian	Georgetown	1826	1826	English	Samuel S. Rind (1826)	OCLC 8786646
United States' Telegraph	Washington, D.C.	1826	1837	English	John S. Meehan (1826–1837)	OCLC 2268926
U. S. telegraph and Commercial Herald	Washington, D.C.	1826	1827	English	Duff Green	OCLC 13433489
Georgetown Columbian and District Advertiser	Georgetown	1827	1827	English	Samuel S. Rind (1827)	OCLC 8786362
Columbian & District Advertiser	Georgetown	1827	1827	English	Samuel S. Rind (–1827)	OCLC 14192977
Mrs A S Colvin's Weekly Messenger	Washington, D.C.	1827	1828	English	A. S. Colvin	OCLC 1758802
United States Telegraph	Washington, D.C.	1827	1828	English	D. Green (–1828)	OCLC 9571320
United States' Telegraph	Washington, D.C.	1827	1837	English	Duff Green, 1827–1837	OCLC 1498163
Georgetown Columbian, District Advertiser, & Commercial Gazette	Georgetown	1828	1828	English	Samuel S. Rind (1828–)	OCLC 10598874
United States Weekly Telegraph	Washington, D.C.	1828	1832	English	Duff Green (1828–)	OCLC 1768775
United States' Telegraph Extra	Washington, D.C.	1828	1829	English	Green and Jarvis (1828–1829)	OCLC 1773561
Washington Chronicle	Washington, D.C.	1828	1828	English	W. Ustick, 1828	OCLC 8795630
Washington City Chronicle	Washington, D.C.	1828	1829	English	A. Rothwell & T. W. Ustick (1828–1829)	OCLC 16259945
We, the People	Washington, D.C.	1828	1828	English	J. Elliot	OCLC 9286086
Columbian Gazette	Georgetown	1829	1835	English	B. Homans (1829–)	OCLC 8786688
Banner of the Constitution	Washington, D.C.	1829	1832	English	Condy Raguet (1829–1832)	OCLC 10260857, ISSN 2156-9347
Washington City Chronicle and Literary Repository	Washington, D.C.	1829	1829	English	A. Rothwell & T. W. Ustick (1829)	OCLC 8833780

=== 1830–1859 ===
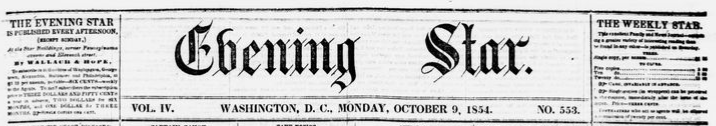
Evening Star, October 9, 1854

There were 143 newspapers founded in Washington, D.C. between 1830 and 1859. The Daily Evening Star, founded in 1852, continued publication under several different names until it ceased publication in 1981, as the Washington Star.

1830–1859 newspapers founded in Washington, D.C.
Newspaper Title	Place of Pub.	Founded	Ended	Language	Publishers, OCLC, ISSN References
The Globe	Washington, D.C.	1830	1845	English	F. P. Blair, OCLC 8772978
The Metropolitan	Washington, D.C.	183?	183?	English	S. D. Langtree & J. L. O'Sullivan, OCLC 27290909
The American Argus	Washington, D.C.	1830	18??	English	J.B. Patterson & Co., OCLC 8787131
American Spectator and Washington City Chronicle	Washington, D.C.	1830	1832	English	Rothwell & Ustick, OCLC 8787078
American Statesman	Washington, D.C.	1830	1830	English	W. Greer, OCLC 8786432
The Weekly Metropolitan	Washington, D.C.	183?	183?	English	S.D. Langtree & J.L. O'Sullivan, OCLC 26607498
The Globe	Washington, D.C.	1831	1843	English	F.P. Blair, OCLC 8786354
Paul Pry	Washington, D.C.	1831	1836	English	Anne Royall, OCLC 10629849
Extra Globe	Washington, D.C.	1832	183?	English	F.P. Blair, OCLC 10658113
The National Union	Washington, D.C.	1832	183?	English	Jesse A. Fell, OCLC 8807203
Washington City Chronicle	Washington, D.C.	1832	1833	English	B. Homans, OCLC 8833744
The Examiner	Washington, D.C.	1833	1833	English	William Greer, OCLC 11777432
The Moderator	Washington, D.C.	1833	18??	English	Unknown, OCLC 8772936
Extra Globe	Washington, D.C.	1834	1841	English	F.P. Blair, OCLC 8995329
North American	Washington, D.C.	1834	1835	English	W. Greer, OCLC 15875989
Washington Examiner	Washington, D.C.	1834	183?	English	William Greer, OCLC 15723738
Washington Mirror	Washington, D.C.	1834	1836	English	J.C. Dunn, OCLC 8769855
The Washington Morning Star and District Chronicle of the Times	Washington, D.C.	1834	18??	English	S. Wild, OCLC 9301062
Daily Advertiser	Georgetown	1835	1???	English	J. Finch, OCLC 8769515
The Appeal	Washington, D.C.	1835	1835	English	William Alexander Rind, Jr., OCLC 8786406
The Metropolitan	Georgetown	1835	1837	English	J.F. Watson & Co., OCLC 8786355
The Sun	Washington, D.C.	1835	1837	English	Learned & Pinkney, OCLC 9303103
The Huntress	Washington, D.C.	1836	1854	English	Anne Royall, OCLC 10613990
The National	Washington, D.C.	1836	183?	English	Gales & Seaton, OCLC 8766646
The Washingtonian and Farmers, Mechanics and Merchants Gazette	Washington, D.C.	1836	1837	English	A.F. Cunningham, OCLC 11772232
The Reformer	Washington, D.C.	1837	1837	English	William W. Moore & Co., OCLC 8766664
The Native American	Washington, D.C.	1837	1840	English	J. Elliot Jr., OCLC 13866852
Potomac Advocate and Metropolitan Intelligencer	Georgetown	1837	1839	English	T. Turner, OCLC 10603121
The Madisonian	Washington, D.C.	1837	1845	English	Thomas Allen, OCLC 8772877
The District News	Washington, D.C.	1838	1838	English	Etter & Bayne, OCLC 8807706
The Metropolis	Washington, D.C.	1838	1840	English	F.S. Myer, OCLC 8766626
The National Whig	Washington, D.C.	1838	18??	English	C.C. Fulton & J.L. Smith, OCLC 15554275
Washington Chronicle	Washington, D.C.	1838	1839	English	Hamilton and Denham, OCLC 8766393
Georgetown Advocate	Georgetown	1839	1841	English	Charles C. Fulton, OCLC 8783963
Georgetown Daily Advocate	Georgetown	1839	1839	English	Charles C. Fulton, OCLC 8786490
Potomac Advocate and Georgetown Intelligencer	Georgetown	1839	1839	English	C.C. Fulton, OCLC 8771572
The Loafers' Weekly Gazette	Washington, D.C.	1839	18??	English	Jabez Witticism, OCLC 8766477
Political Reformer	Washington, D.C.	1840	18??	English	Editor: Theophilus Fisk., OCLC 8062457
The Whig Standard	Washington, D.C.	184?	18??	English	Jno. T. Tower, OCLC 30044062
The Washington Metropolis	Washington, D.C.	1840	1840	English	F.S. Myer, OCLC 8766635
Georgetown Advocate	Georgetown	1841	18??	English	OCLC 8786463
The Daily Madisonian	Washington, D.C.	1841	1845	English	J.B. Jones, OCLC 10318917
The Independent	Washington, D.C.	1841	1842	English	Johnston, & Woodson, OCLC 8781051
Union Democrat	Washington, D.C.	1841	1842	English	A. Kendall, OCLC 9303576
The True Whig	Washington, D.C.	1841	1843	English	Calvin Colton, OCLC 9299605
The Washington Star	Washington, D.C.	1841	1891	English	C. Sexton, OCLC 10344229
Weekly Globe	Washington, D.C.	1841	1845	English	Blair & Rives, OCLC 8776973
Weekly National Intelligencer	Washington, D.C.	1841	1869	English	Gales & Seaton, OCLC 8355031
The Index	Washington, D.C.	1842	18??	English	John M. Johnson, OCLC 13682844
The Spectator	Washington, D.C.	1842	1844	English	Martin & Heart, OCLC 8792153
True Whig	Washington, D.C.	1842	1842	English	Calvin Colton, OCLC 9319212
National Zeitung	Washington, D.C.	1843	18??	English	P. Augustus Sage, OCLC 15798077
The Spectator	Washington, D.C.	1843	1844	English	John Heart, OCLC 10448076
The Whig Standard	Washington, D.C.	1843	1844	English	John T. Towers, OCLC 9286896
The Capitol	Washington, D.C.	1843	1844	English	Randall & Fields, OCLC 8772799
The Daily Globe	Washington, D.C.	1844	1845	English	F.P. Blair & J.C. Rives, OCLC 8807577
The Constitution	Washington, D.C.	1844	1845	English	Harris & Heart, OCLC 8804535
The Hickory Tree	Washington, D.C.	1844	18??	English	William and J.C. Greer, OCLC 8766438
The Dollar Globe	Washington, D.C.	1844	1845	English	Blair & Rives, OCLC 16638300
Young Hickory	Washington, D.C.	1844	1844	English	J. Heart, OCLC 8719852
The Daily Bee	Washington, D.C.	1845	1845	English	Gobright, Melvin & Smith, OCLC 8786366
Congressional Intelligencer	Washington, D.C.	1845	1846	English	Gales & Seaton, OCLC 27689300
The Columbian Fountain	Washington, D.C.	1845	1846	English	U. Ward, OCLC 8791329
Democratic Expositor and United States Journal for the Country	Washington, D.C.	1845	1846	English	Theophilus Fisk & Jesse E. Dow, OCLC 14238763
The Daily Union	Washington, D.C.	1845	1857	English	Thomas Ritchie & John P. Heiss, OCLC 8770145
The Semi-Weekly Union	Washington, D.C.	1845	1859	English	T. Ritchie & J.P. Heiss, OCLC 2267615
The United States Journal	Washington, D.C.	1845	1846	English	J.E. Dow & Co., OCLC 9302092
Weekly Union	Washington, D.C.	1845	1859	English	Ritchie and Heiss, OCLC 10641912
The Washingtonian	Washington, D.C.	1845	1845	English	G. Cochran & Co., OCLC 9286042
The Daily Fountain	Washington, D.C.	1846	18??	English	U. Ward & Son, OCLC 8799340
The Fountain	Washington, D.C.	1846	1846	English	U. Ward, OCLC 8791524
Columbian Fountain	Washington, D.C.	1846	1846	English	U. Ward, OCLC 8799300
The Daily Times	Washington, D.C.	1846	1846	English	Jesse E. Dow, OCLC 8776358
The Semi-Weekly Times	Washington, D.C.	1846	1846	English	J.E. Dow, OCLC 9302412
Saturday Evening News, and District General Advertiser	Washington, D.C.	1846	1848	English	W. Thompson, OCLC 8807823
The Weekly Times	Washington, D.C.	1846	1846	English	J.E. Dow, Editor: H.H. Robinson, OCLC 9302363
The Daily American	Washington, D.C.	1847	1847	English	Davis, Drew & Co., OCLC 8786376
The Daily National Whig	Washington, D.C.	1847	1849	English	C.W. Fenton, OCLC 8807698
The National Era	Washington, D.C.	1847	1860	English	L.P. Noble, OCLC 10642039
The National Whig	Washington, D.C.	1847	1847	English	C.W. Fenton, OCLC 8773541
The American	Washington, D.C.	1847	1847	English	J.N. Davis & Columbus Drew, OCLC 8774923
Weekly National Whig	Washington, D.C.	1847	18??	English	Chas. W. Fenton, OCLC 33821990
The Daily Globe	Washington, D.C.	1848	1873	English	Francis P. Blair, John Rives, James C. Pickett, OCLC 10658203
The Congressional Supplement	Washington, D.C.	1848	1849	English	OCLC 15259736
The Battery	Washington, D.C.	1848	1849	English	G.S. Gideon, OCLC 5141995
The Saturday News	Washington, D.C.	1848	1848	English	W. Thompson, OCLC 8807841
The Washington News	Washington, D.C.	1848	1852	English	W. Thompson, OCLC 8772983
The Weekly Globe	Washington, D.C.	1848	1851	English	Francis P. Blair, John C. Rives, James C. Pickett, OCLC 8777061
The Times	Washington, D.C.	1848	1848	English	unknown, OCLC 13368897
The Campaign	Washington, D.C.	1848	1849	English	Ritchie & Heiss, OCLC 4472358
The Court Journal	Washington, D.C.	1849	18??	English	William Adam, OCLC 21222167
The Republic	Washington, D.C.	1849	1853	English	Gideon & Co., OCLC 8807273
Aerial Reporter	Washington, D.C.	185?	18??	English	Rufus Porter, OCLC 34765425
The Southern Press	Washington, D.C.	1850	1852	English	Ellwood Fisher and Edwin De Leon, OCLC 10345396
The Weekly Washington Union	Washington, D.C.	185?	18??	English	Cornelius Wendell, OCLC 9286206
Der Zuschauer am Potomac	Washington, D.C.	1850	1851	English, German	Friedrich Schmidt, OCLC 13440684
Daily American Telegraph	Washington, D.C.	1851	1852	English	T.C. Connolly, OCLC 8786417
Georgetown Reporter	Georgetown	1851	18??	English	J.A. Williamson, OCLC 39489137
The Metropolitan	Washington, D.C.	1851	1853	English	Lucien Lasselle, OCLC 8766612
American Telegraph	Washington, D.C.	1851	1851	English	Connolly, Wimer & McGill, OCLC 8786426
Christian Statesman	Washington, D.C.	1851	18??	English	Gurley & Goodloe, OCLC 33821910
The Cotton Plant	Washington, D.C.	1852	1857	English	C.G. Baylor, OCLC 9405752
Daily Evening Star	Washington, D.C.	1852	1854	English	J.B. Tate, OCLC 9574197
The Signal	Washington, D.C.	1852	1853	English	Geo. S. Gideon, OCLC 7913543
Washington Semi-weekly News	Washington, D.C.	1852	1854	English	W. Thompson, OCLC 8773083
The Campaign	Washington, D.C.	1852	1853	English	Robert Armstrong, Author: Democratic Party, OCLC 11753170
The Daily Republic	Washington, D.C.	1853	1853	English	Gideon & Co., OCLC 8766570
Der National Demokrat; ein Politisches und Literarisches Familienblatt	Washington, D.C.	1853	18??	German	Buell & Blanchard, OCLC 702345796
The Truth	Washington, D.C.	1853	18??	English	J. Robertson, OCLC 9278842
Washington Sentinel	Washington, D.C.	1853	1856	English	Beverley Tucker, OCLC 8797054
Washington Sentinel	Washington, D.C.	1853	1855	English	Beverley Tucker and Wm. M. Overton, OCLC 10345474
The Weekly Metropolitan	Washington, D.C.	1853	185?	English	Lucien Lasselle, OCLC 8799249
The Weekly Star	Washington, D.C.	1853	1891	English	OCLC 9298967
Workingmen's National Advocate	Washington, D.C.	1853	1853	English	OCLC 16156332
Daily American Organ	Washington, D.C.	1854	1856	English	OCLC 11584698
Daily National Era	Washington, D.C.	1854	1854	English	OCLC 4364562
Tuesday's Congressional Globe	Washington, D.C.	1854	1857	English	OCLC 9299505
The Washington News	Washington, D.C.	1854	1858	English	OCLC 8789746
Weekly American Organ	Washington, D.C.	1854	1857	English	OCLC 8771470
State Rights Register	Washington, D.C.	1854	18??	English	OCLC 15233488
Evening Star	Washington, D.C.	1854	1972	English	OCLC 2260929
The Spectator	Washington, D.C.	1855	18??	English	OCLC 9299184
The National	Washington, D.C.	1856	18??	English	OCLC 31800555
Saturday Mercury	Washington, D.C.	1856	1856	English	OCLC 14289542
The Washington Bee	Washington, D.C.	1856	1856	English	OCLC 8795165
The Weekly Bee & Model Advertiser	Washington, D.C.	1856	18??	English	OCLC 8795082
The Republic	Washington, D.C.	1857	18??	English	OCLC 8796766
The American	Washington, D.C.	1857	1857	English	OCLC 8774818
The Washington Union	Washington, D.C.	1857	1859	English	OCLC 8776746
The States	Washington, D.C.	1857	1859	English	OCLC 10315398
The Daily Advertiser	Washington, D.C.	1858	18??	English	OCLC 8771679
DeBow's Weekly Press	Washington, D.C.	1858	1???	English	OCLC 14971879
American Eagle and Flag of Liberty	Washington, D.C.	1858	????	English	OCLC 13858372
The States	Washington, D.C.	1858	1859	English	OCLC 15233460
Weekly American	Washington, D.C.	1858	1858	English	OCLC 8774841
The Evening Bulletin	Washington, D.C.	1858	1858	English	OCLC 8780790
The Constitution	Washington, D.C.	1859	1861	English	OCLC 8799651
Semi-weekly Constitution	Washington, D.C.	1859	1861	English	OCLC 13182468
Washington Examiner	Washington, D.C.	1859	18??	English	OCLC 8807862
The Weekly Constitution	Washington, D.C.	1859	1861	English	OCLC 8797827
Washingtoner Intelligenzblatt	Washington, D.C.	1859	1863	German	OCLC 8811037
The States and Union	Washington, D.C.	1859	1861	English	OCLC 10320184
The States and Union	Washington, D.C.	1859	????	English	John P. Heiss, OCLC 15206074

=== 1860–1899 ===
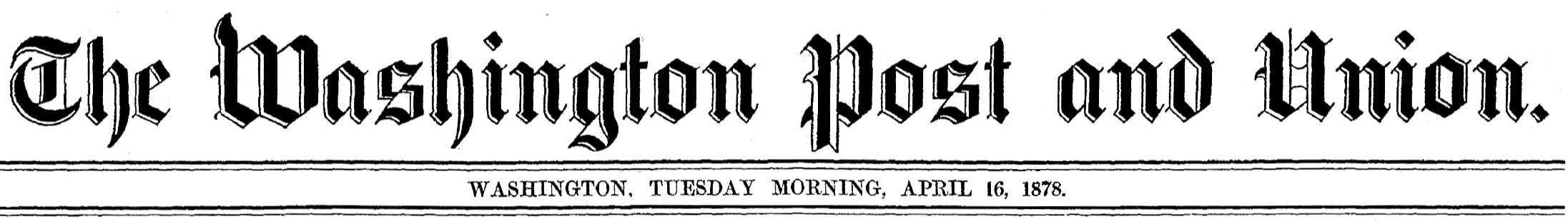
Washington Post and Union

There were 184 newspapers founded in Washington, D.C. between 1860 and 1899. This included newspapers found at Union military camps and hospitals during the American Civil War. The Washington Post, founded in 1877, continues to be published as a national newspaper in the 21st century. Several African American-owned newspapers were founded during reconstruction in Washington, D.C., including The National Savings Bank in 1868 and the New National Era and New Era in 1870.

1860–1899 newspapers founded in Washington, D.C.
Newspaper Title	Place of Pub.	Founded	Ended	Language	Publishers, OCLC, ISSN References
Finley Hospital Weekly	Finley General Hospital	186?	18??	English	Finley General Hospital, OCLC 21782182
The Guide	Washington, D.C.	186?	1???	English	Frank Russell Reading and Geo. C. Jackson, OCLC 26757639
Armory Square Hospital Gazette	Washington, D.C.	186?	1865	English	Armory Square Hospital, OCLC 27353796
The National Republican	Washington, D.C.	1860	1862	English	Lewis Clephane & Co., OCLC 8791688, ISSN 2158-8899
National Republican	Washington, D.C.	1860	1863	English	W. J. Murtagh & Co., OCLC 13832961
The People's Weekly	Washington, D.C. and Baltimore, Maryland	186?	18??	English	Ben E. Green, N. B. Talbott, & A. J. Appleby, OCLC 32427911
Our Newspaper	Washington, D.C.	1860	18??	English	OCLC 11609823
The Union Guard	Washington, D.C.	1860	186?	English	N. D. Larner, OCLC 9139050
Tägliche Metropole	Washington, D.C.	1860	1861	German	W. Koch & Co., OCLC 9298674
The Campaign Constitution	Washington, D.C.	1860	1860	English	William M. Browne, OCLC 11753110
The Confederation	Washington, D.C.	1861	18??	English	William H. Hope & Co., OCLC 8791127
Union and Army Reporter	Washington, D.C.	1861	1???	English	John H. McCutchen, OCLC 39704016
Washington Chronicle	Washington, D.C.	1861	????	English	J. Q. Thompson & Co., OCLC 12967709
Sunday Morning Chronicle	Washington, D.C.	1861	1872	English	OCLC 10796474
The Camp Kettle	Camp Kalorama	1861	186?	English	Field & Staff of the Roundhead Regiment, OCLC 12800632
The Dragoon	Camp Barker	1862	1???	English	The McClellan Dragoons, OCLC 30067537
Daily Morning Chronicle	Washington, D.C.	1862	1874	English	OCLC 9431579
Daily National Republican	Washington, D.C.	1862	1866	English	W. J. Murtagh & Co., OCLC 13879073, ISSN 2158-2831
The Knapsack	Camp Edward, Tennallytown	1862	18??	English	Richard Geo. Rogers, John T. Howe, Sheldon T. Gibbs, OCLC 19648299
Columbia	Washington, D.C.	1863	1873	German	OCLC 8791632
The Army Herald	Washington, D. C. and Cleveland, Ohio	1863	1868	English	C. G. Bruce, OCLC 18268594
Weekly Constitutional Union	Washington, D.C.	1863	1870	English	OCLC 9286176
Weekly National Republican	Washington, D.C.	1863	1877	English	OCLC 8769395
The Sunday Times	Washington, D.C.	1863	1864	English	OCLC 10315582
Army & Navy Ledger	Washington, D.C.	1864	1864	English	OCLC 38746013
The Daily Times	Washington, D.C.	1864	1???	English	OCLC 9301406
The New Era	Washington, D.C.	1864	1864	English	New Era Co., OCLC 15802663
The Reveille	Carver U.S. General Hospital	1864	18??	English	Carver General Hospital, OCLC 30491674
Roll Call	Washington, D.C.	1864	1???	English	OCLC 19568669
Washington Weekly Chronicle	Washington, D.C.	1864	1875	English	OCLC 8766385
The Georgetown Courier	Georgetown	1865	1876	English	OCLC 8769325
The Balance	Washington, D.C.	1865	18??	English	OCLC 8786381
The Reconstructionist	Washington, D.C.	1865	1866	English	Jane G. Swisshelm, OCLC 11609931
The Great Republic	Washington, D.C.	1866	1???	English	Great Republic Assoc., OCLC 15233479
The National Republican	Washington, D.C.	1866	1870	English	W.J. Murtagh & Co., OCLC 13880324, ISSN 2159-3841
The Orphans' Advocate	Washington, D.C.	1866	1866	English	Soldiers' and Sailors' Orphans' Fair, OCLC 8178972
The Sunday Herald	Washington, D.C.	1866	1887	English	John T. Halleck & Co., OCLC 12792064, ISSN 2157-3379
The Daily Evening Dispatch	Washington, D.C.	1867	18??	English	T. Z. Hoover & Co., OCLC 16671351
The Guardian	Washington, D.C.	1867	18??	English	O'Neil, Tenney & Co., OCLC 8766391
Evening Express	Washington, D.C.	1867	1869	English	O. Thorn & Co., OCLC 8807521
Evening Union	Georgetown	1867	1869	English	T. B. Florence, OCLC 8786469
The Evening Leader	Washington, D.C.	1867	1867	English	Leader Co., OCLC 10618257
The Critic	Washington, D.C.	1868	1872	English	The Critic, OCLC 8807482
National Radical	Washington, D.C.	1868	18??	English	OCLC 13282855
National Savings Bank	Washington, D.C.	1868	18??	English	Subject: African American Banks, OCLC 904283370
L'Opinion Publique	Washington, D.C.	1868	1868	French	F. P. Barclay, OCLC 13299699
The Washington Times	Washington, D.C.	1868	19??	English	W. D. Hughes, OCLC 9285626
Sunday Morning Gazette	Washington, D.C.	1868	187?	English	Thomas B. Florence, OCLC 8776945
The Times	Washington, D.C.	1868	18??	English	W. D. Hughes, OCLC 16046603
Campaign Digest and Anti-Radical Standard	Washington, D.C.	1868	18??	English	Wm. Allen Mitchener & Co., OCLC 22231208
The Georgetown Citizen and Semi-Weekly Register	Georgetown	1869	18??	English	George W. Greenwood & Co., OCLC 12986891
Daily National Intelligencer and Washington Express	Washington, D.C.	1869	1870	English	Intelligencer and Express Pub. Assoc., OCLC 11337738
The Morning News	Washington, D.C.	1869	1870	English	M. C. Hart & J. D. Winter, OCLC 15875836
Saturday Evening Visitor	Washington, D.C.	1869	1870	English	W.F. Holtzman & Co., OCLC 8766583
The Washington Express	Washington, D.C.	1869	1869	English	H. Ward & Co., OCLC 8807763
Daily Evening Journal	Washington, D.C.	1870	187?	English	OCLC 27408518
Homestead Champion	Washington, D.C.	1870	1872	English	Hugh Cameron, OCLC 27424303
The Gazette	Washington, D.C.	187?	188?	English	G. W. Alexander, OCLC 8786365
Grand Army Journal	Washington, D.C.	1870	1872	English	Wm. T. Collins, OCLC 11614903
Commercial	Washington, D.C.	187?	188?	English	OCLC 27420357
The Daily Patriot	Washington, D.C.	1870	1872	English	Patriot Newspaper Assn., OCLC 8802809
Daily National Republican	Washington, D.C.	1870	1872	English	W. J. Murtagh, OCLC 13888533, ISSN 2158-2858
New National Era	Washington, D.C.	1870	1874	English	Frederick Douglass (African American), OCLC 10641996
New Era	Washington, D.C.	1870	1870	English	unknown (African American), OCLC 10931292, ISSN 2471-6316
The National Standard	Washington, D.C.	1870	1872	English	National Standard Pub. Co., OCLC 10771736
Post Office Gazette	Washington, D.C.	1870	18??	English	An employee of the Post Office Dept., OCLC 13846033
The Weekly Patriot	Washington, D.C.	1870	????	English	Patriot Newspaper Association, OCLC 15229738
The Evening Telegram	Washington, D.C.	1870	18??	English	OCLC 9302274
The Public Voice	Washington, D.C.	1871	????	English	Democratic News Co., OCLC 8807231
Täglicher Washingtoner Anzeiger	Washington, D.C.	1871	1873	German	N. H. Miller, OCLC 8792259
The Citizen	Washington, D.C.	1871	1871	English	OCLC 8794855
The Capital	Washington, D.C.	1871	18??	English	E. Jenkins, OCLC 8814819
Daily Critic	Washington, D.C.	1872	1881	English	Ringwalt, Hack & Co., OCLC 8807901, ISSN 2151-3902
Forney's Sunday Morning Chronicle	Washington, D.C.	1872	1873	English	D. C. Forney, OCLC 12968047
National Republican	Washington, D.C.	1872	1888	English	W. J. Murtagh, OCLC 13891753, ISSN 2151-4437
The Union Sentinel	Washington, D.C.	1872	187?	English	OCLC 27410770
The New Citizen	Washington, D.C.	1873	1873	English	New Citizen Pub. Co., OCLC 27420273
The Item	Washington, D.C.	1873	18??	English	T. J. Brashears, OCLC 8766469
Washington Sentinel	Washington, D.C.	1873	1910	English	L. Schade,, ISSN 1940-7378
Washingtoner Journal	Washington, D.C.	1873	1888	German	Werner Koch, OCLC 10618711
Forney's Sunday Chronicle	Washington, D.C.	1874	1881	English	D. C. Forney, OCLC 13211745
United States Record and Gazette	Washington, D.C.	1874	1???	English	J. H. Soule, OCLC 35562932
Washington Chronicle	Washington, D.C.	1874	18??	English	Chronicle Pub. Co., OCLC 9427399
The Evening Mail	Washington, D.C.	1874	18??	English	Mail Pub. Co., OCLC 8766518
The Commoner	Washington, D.C.	1875	1875	English	G. W. Williams, OCLC 13712980
The Daily News	Washington, D.C.	1875	1877	English	Cunningham & Brashears, OCLC 13282797
Der Volks-Tribun	Washington, D.C.	1875	1902	German	E. Waldecker & Co., OCLC 13436599
The Washington Tribune	Washington, D.C.	1875	1875	English	Hewett & Follansbee, OCLC 13370570
The Telegram	Washington, D.C.	1875	1876	English	H. Coyle, OCLC 16126078
The Sunday Herald	Washington, D.C.	1875	18??	English	I. N. Burritt, OCLC 9278610
The Daily Nation	Washington, D.C.	1876	1877	English	Nation Co., OCLC 8807863
The Daily Telegram	Washington, D.C.	1876	1880	English	H. Coyle, OCLC 9301676
The Union	Washington, D.C.	1876	1877	English	H. Polkinhorn, OCLC 9278877
The Republic	Washington, D.C.	1877	18??	English	R. H. Darby, OCLC 13352692
The National Tribune	Washington, D.C.	1877	1917	English	G. E. Lemon & Co., OCLC 9186825, ISSN 2151-3937
National Union	Washington, D.C.	1877	1878	English	John Lynch, OCLC 8776863
The Washington Post (Washington Post and Union)	Washington, D.C.	1877	current (1954)	English	Washington Post Co.,OCLC 8787120, ISSN 2641-0702
The Washington Weekly Post	Washington, D.C.	1878	1916	English	Stilson Hutchings, OCLC 16046436, ISSN 1941-0743
The Weekly Republic	Washington, D.C.	1878	1878	English	OCLC 15987884
The National View	Washington, D.C.	1879	1895	English	View Pub. Co., OCLC 8807206
The Soldier's True Friend	Washington, D.C.	1879	1880	English	C. G. Bennett, OCLC 17758889
Vedette	Washington, D.C.	1879	18??	English	A. M. Kenady, OCLC 1768965
The Washington World	Washington, D.C.	1879	1881	English	L. W. Vale, OCLC 9285949
The Exodus	Washington, D.C.	1880	18??	English	Exodus Co., OCLC 10873779
The Woman's Tribune	Washington, D.C.	188?	19??	English	C.B. Colby, OCLC 39315003
The Union Volunteer	Washington, D.C.	188?	1???	English	W. B. Mix and H. T. Burrows, OCLC 13882139
Washington Courier	Washington, D.C.	1880	18??	English	C. G. Bennett, OCLC 29740999
The Washington Daily Reporter	Washington, D.C.	188?	1???	English	Washington Hotel Daily Reporter Co., OCLC 30444346
The Telephone	Washington, D.C.	1880	1881	English	Gobright & Beardsley, OCLC 9301517
The Washington Telephone	Washington, D.C.	1881	1881	English	Beardsley & Bramhall, OCLC 9301565
Washington Weekly World and Citizen-Soldier	Washington, D.C.	1881	1882	English	World and Soldier Pub. Co., OCLC 11614776
Weekly Washington World and Citizen-Soldier	Washington, D.C.	1881	1883	English	World and Soldier Pub. Co., OCLC 9302469
Sunday Chronicle	Washington, D.C.	1881	1882	English	Sunday Chronicle Co., OCLC 15712174
The Budget	Washington, D.C.	1881	1???	English	Editor: Frank S. ParksOCLC 863727905
The Evening Critic	Washington, D.C.	1881	1885	English	Evening Critic Pub. Co., OCLC 8807411, ISSN 2151-3910
The Grand Army Record	Washington, D.C.	1882	1883	English	OCLC 933398414
The Bee	Washington, D.C.	1882	1884	English	Turner & Hamlin, OCLC 10587821, ISSN 2157-3298
The Dapa Press	Washington, D.C.	1882	1???	English	OCLC 864018861
The National Farmer	Washington, D.C.	1882	18??	English	Farmer Pub. Co., OCLC 31909132
The National Republican	Washington, D.C.	1882	188?	English	OCLC 32881011
Washington Sunday chronicle	Washington, D.C.	1882	1889	English	Chronicle Co., OCLC 15712213
Washington World and Citizen-Soldier	Washington, D.C.	1882	1884	English	World and Soldier Pub. Co., OCLC 11614809
The Craftsman	Washington, D.C.	1883	????	English	Craftsman Pub. Co., OCLC 29631334
The Hatchet	Washington, D.C.	1883	19??	English	The Hatchet Pub. Co., OCLC 8766407, ISSN 1934-1806
The Grit	Washington, D.C.	1883	1884	English	W. B. Avery (African-American), OCLC 10587833
The Washington Independent	Washington, D.C.	1883	????	English	E. W. Oyster, OCLC 35101179
The Weekly National Republican	Washington, D.C.	1883	1892	English	National Republican Co., OCLC 10963336
The American	Washington, D.C.	1884	188?	English	American Pub., OCLC 12270472
United States Democrat	Washington, D.C.	1884	18??	English	M. M. Pomeroy, OCLC 16126236
The Washington Bee	Washington, D.C.	1884	1922	English	Bee Pub. Co., OCLC 10587828, ISSN 1940-7424
Washington Grit	Washington, D.C.	1884	1884	English	J. E. Bruce, OCLC 10587840
The National Republican	Washington, D.C.	1885	18??	English	National Republican Co.,OCLC 8833264, ISSN 2157-2208
The Washington Critic	Washington, D.C.	1885	1888	English	Evening Critic Pub. Co.,OCLC 8769874, ISSN 2151-3880
The Independent	Washington, D.C.	1886	188?	English	T. J. Baldwin, OCLC 27688599
The News	Washington, D.C.	1886	1???	English	Alice R. Neale, OCLC 36203183
The Mission Bulletin	Washington, D.C.	1886	1917	English	Central Union Mission, OCLC 31909026
The Lake Borgne Outlet	Washington, D.C. and New Orleans, LA	1886	18??	English	Lake Borgne Pub. Co.OCLC 20377934
The Sunday Herald and Weekly National Intelligencer	Washington, D.C.	1887	1896	English	T. B. Kalbfus, OCLC 9303012, ISSN 2157-2143
The National Leader	Washington, D.C.	1888	1889	English	Robinson Bros. (African-American), OCLC 10373249
Washington Journal	Washington, D.C.	1888	2002	German	W. Koch, OCLC 8786862
The Washington Press	Washington, D.C.	1888	1890	English	Daily Press Co., OCLC 8807212
The Canteen	Washington, D.C.	1888	????	English	Canteen Pub. Co., OCLC 18719630
The Evening Post	Washington, D.C.	1888	1889	English	Washington Post Co., OCLC 8769751,ISSN 2157-2224
National democrat	Washington, D.C.	1889	1895	English	E. Hudson, OCLC 8833320
The Mercury	Washington, D.C.	1889	1???	English	The Mercury, OCLC 39333862
The Leader	Washington, D.C.	1889	18??	English	Robinson Bros. (African American), OCLC 10373277
Washington Chronicle	Washington, D.C.	1889	1911	English	J. Q. Thompson & Co., OCLC 15712257
The Washington Critic	Washington, D.C.	1889	1889	English	Washington Critic Co.,OCLC 8769923, ISSN 2157-2259
The Capital and Critic	Washington, D.C.	1889	1889	English	Washington Critic Co.,OCLC 8807379
The Evening Capital and Critic	Washington, D.C.	1889	1889	English	Washington Critic Co.,OCLC 8807450
The Evening Capital	Washington, D.C.	1889	1890	English	Washington Critic Co., OCLC 17426705
The Daily Critic	Washington, D.C.	1890	1890	English	Washington Critic Co.,OCLC 232334430, ISSN 2157-3093
The Daily Critic	Washington, D.C.	1890	1890	English	Washington Critic Co.,OCLC 232334790, ISSN 2157-2291
The Critic	Washington, D.C.	1890	1891	English	Washington Critic Co.OCLC 232334790, ISSN 2157-2291
The Fourth Class Postmaster	Washington, D.C.	189?	1900	English	W. B. Lindsey, OCLC 31909107
Grand Army journal	Washington, D.C.	1890	1???	English	J. D. Rhodes, OCLC 30083699
The Pilot	Washington, D.C.	189?	1???	English	N. Sprague, OCLC 17434592
Silver Knight and National Watchman	Washington, D.C.	189?	1896	English	Silver Knight Pub. Co., OCLC 30616674
The Washington Critic	Washington, D.C.	1890	1890	English	Washington Critic Co., OCLC 232333959
The Critic and Record	Washington, D.C.	1891	1896	English	Washington Critic Co., OCLC 15986827, ISSN 2151-5255
The Suburban Citizen	Washington, D.C.	1891	1902	English	Suburban Citizen Newspaper Co., OCLC 9298727
National Watchman	Washington, D.C.	1892	189?	English	People's Party Congressional Committee, OCLC 34527710
The Evening News	Washington, D.C.	1892	1894	English	Washington News Pub. Co., OCLC 8766411
The Colored American	Washington, D.C.	1893	1904	English	Colored American Pub. Co., , ISSN 1940-7416
No Compromise	Washington, D.C.	1893	189?	English	No Compromise Pub. Co., OCLC 24165785
The Tocsin	Washington, D.C.	1893	189?	English	Tocsin Pub. Co., OCLC 11614621
The Pathfinder	Washington, D.C.	1894	19??	English	Pathfinder Pub. Co., OCLC 11609867
The United American	Washington, D.C.	1894	1896	English	United American Pub. Co., OCLC 9285262
United States Times	Washington, D.C.	1894	????	English	J. St. Johns, OCLC 17436047
The Washington News	Washington, D.C.	1894	1896	English	Washington News Pub. Co., OCLC 8766357
Washington Times	Washington, D.C.	1894	1895	English	Washington Times Pub. Co., OCLC 16069817, ISSN 2151-5263
The Morning Times	Washington, D.C.	1895	1897	English	Washington Times, CompanyOCLC 10954900
The Washington Capital	Washington, D.C.	1895	19??	English	Hobart Brooks, OCLC 26750668
The Evening Times	Washington, D.C.	1895	1902	English	Washington Times Co., OCLC 10954477
The Columbia Sentinel	Washington, D.C.	1896	????	English	Sentinel Pub. Co., OCLC 17331881
The National Recorder	Washington, D.C.	1896	????	English	National Recorder Co., OCLC 11458545
The Washington Capital	Washington, D.C.	1896	19??	English	Hobart Brooks, OCLC 32794320
The Silver Knight-Watchman	Washington, D.C.	1897	1899	English	Silver Knight Pub. Co., OCLC 12982896
The Times	Washington, D.C.	1897	1901	English	W. S. Hutchins,OCLC 11987295, ISSN 2151-3465
The Capitol Vista	Brookland	1897	current	English	Sarah Willard HowekmOCLC 44939395
National Intelligencer	Washington, D.C.	1898	1???	English	National Intelligencer Pub. Co., OCLC 17434817
National Watchman	Washington, D.C.	1899	1901	English	Democratic National Pub. Co., OCLC 12982914
The Washington Mirror	Washington, D.C.	1899	1905	English	American Newspaper Syndicate, OCLC 26756000

== Front pages ==
Selected front pages
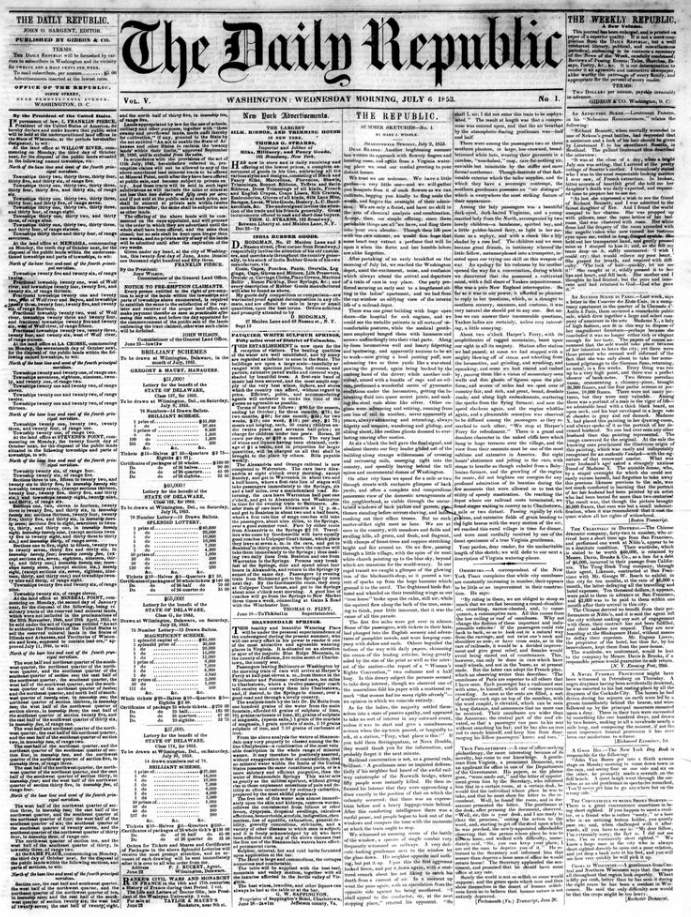
The Daily Republic, July 6, 1853

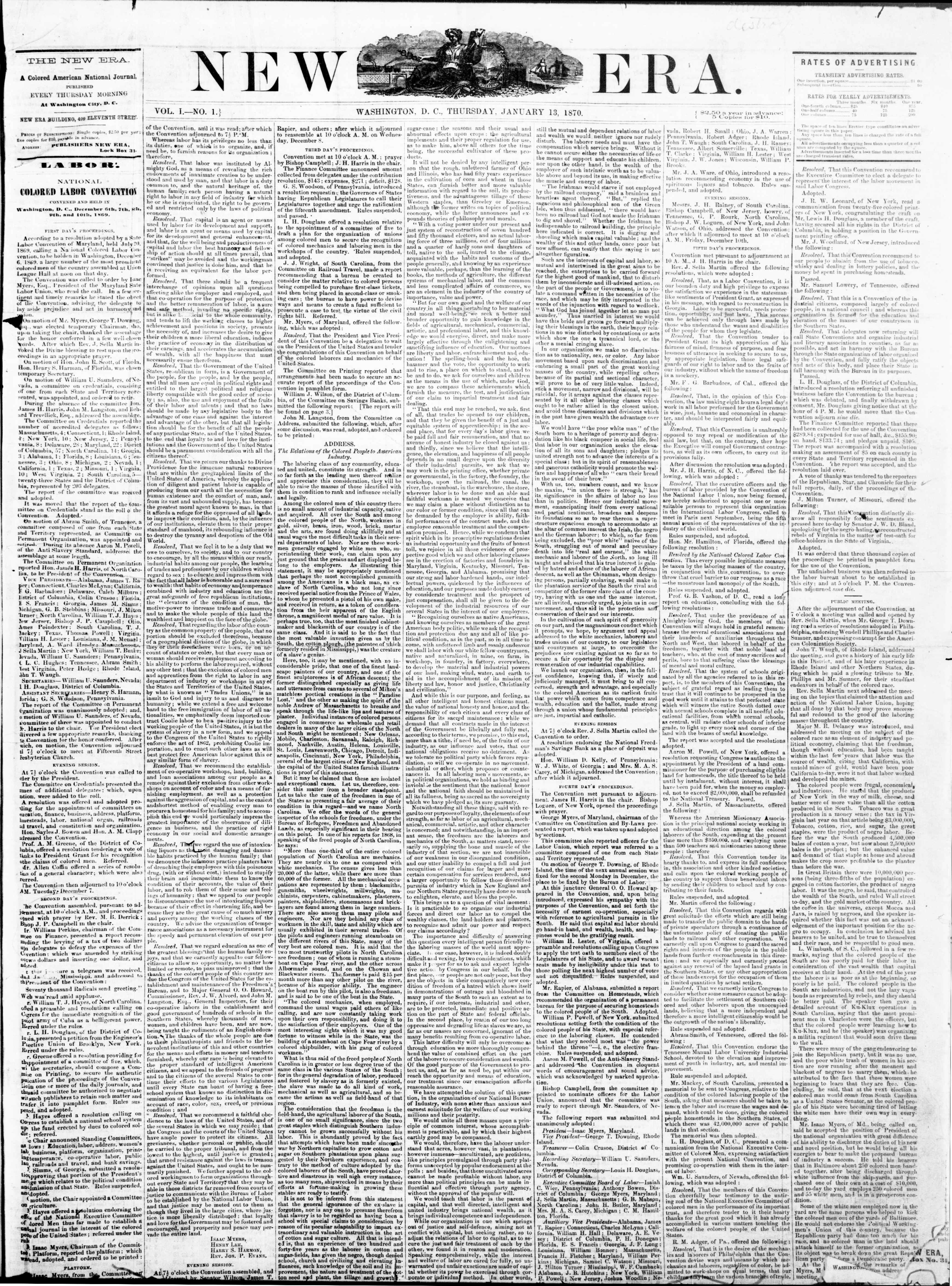
The New Era, January 13, 1870

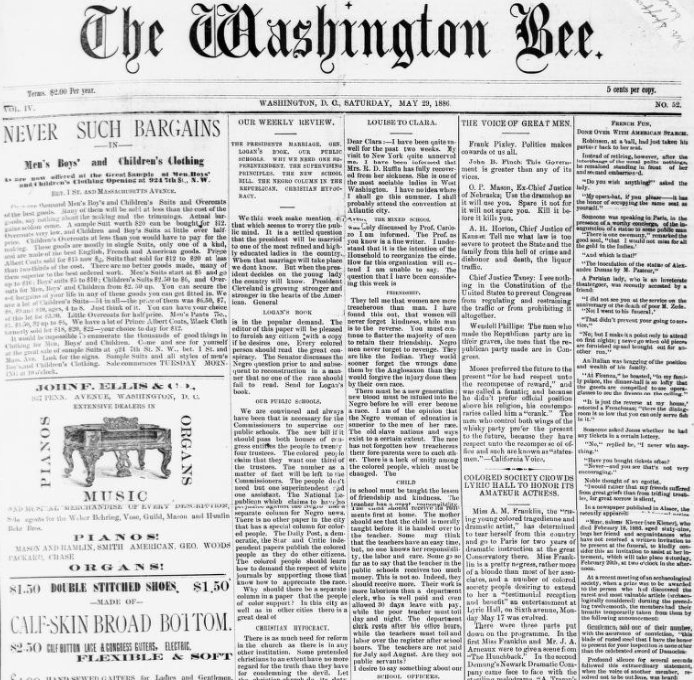
The Washington Bee, May 29, 1886

The Colored American, November 25, 1899

Washington Times, February 15, 1922

== Bibliography ==
- S. N. D. North; United States Department of the Interior (1884). "Catalogue of Periodical Publications: District of Columbia". History and Present Condition of the Newspaper and Periodical Press of the United States. Washington, D.C.: Government Printing Office. OCLC 1850475.
- James T. Haley, ed. (1895), "Newspapers: District of Columbia", Afro-American Encyclopaedia, Nashville: Haley & Florida, hdl:2027/inu.30000029292855, OCLC 219597043
- "District of Columbia". American Newspaper Directory. New York: George P. Rowell. 1900. hdl:2027/umn.31951002273861a.
- "District of Columbia". American Newspaper Annual & Directory. Philadelphia: N. W. Ayer & Son. 1922. pp. 143+. hdl:2027/umn.31951001295695n.
- Federal Writers' Project (1937), "Washington Journalism", Washington, City and Capital, American Guide Series, Washington, D.C.: Government Printing Office, pp. 170+, hdl:2027/uc1.b3850087 – via HathiTrust
