= The Washington Times (1894–1939) =

American daily newspaper (1894–1939)

- Cover page of the Washington Times from February 26, 1922, prior to merger
- Type: Daily newspaper
- Format: Broadsheet
- Owner: Charles G. Conn
- Publisher: The Washington Times Publishing Company
- Founded: March 18, 1894
- Ceased publication: 1939
- Headquarters: Washington, D.C.
- City: Washington, D.C.
- Country: United States
- ISSN: 2151-5263
- OCLC number: 16069817

The Washington Times (1894–1939) was an American, English-language daily newspaper published in Washington, D.C. It was founded in 1894 and merged with The Washington Herald to create the Washington Times-Herald in 1939.

== History ==
The paper was created by Indiana instrument manufacturer Charles G. Conn (1844–1931) while he served as a United States Congressman. The first publisher was Stilson Hutchins. Subsequent owners included newspaper syndicate owner Frank A. Munsey (known as the "Dealer in Dailies" and the "Undertaker of Journalism"), Arthur Brisbane, and William Randolph Hearst.

After Hearst's acquisition of The Washington Herald, the newspaper's operations moved to the Philip M. Jullien-designed Washington Times and Herald Building in 1923.

== Reporters and columnists ==
Washington Times writers and columnists included Arthur Brisbane, Ruth Jones pen name "Jean Eliot", Rilla Engle, Evelyn Hunt, A. Cloyd Gill, Homer Dodge, Avery Marks, humorist Kirk Crothers Miller, William Lenhart McPherson, Robert Halsey Patchin, "dean of the Washington press" Colonel Matthew Fitzimmons Tighe, and William Lee Trenholm.

== Editors ==
Harry Atwood Colman, Louis Ashley Dougher, Earl Godwin, Ralph A. Graves, Ruth Eleanor Jones, Alonzo T. MacDonald, Arthur D. Marks, Caryll Neil Odell, M. G. Seckendorff, and Edward Dwight Shaw.

== Subsequent mergers ==
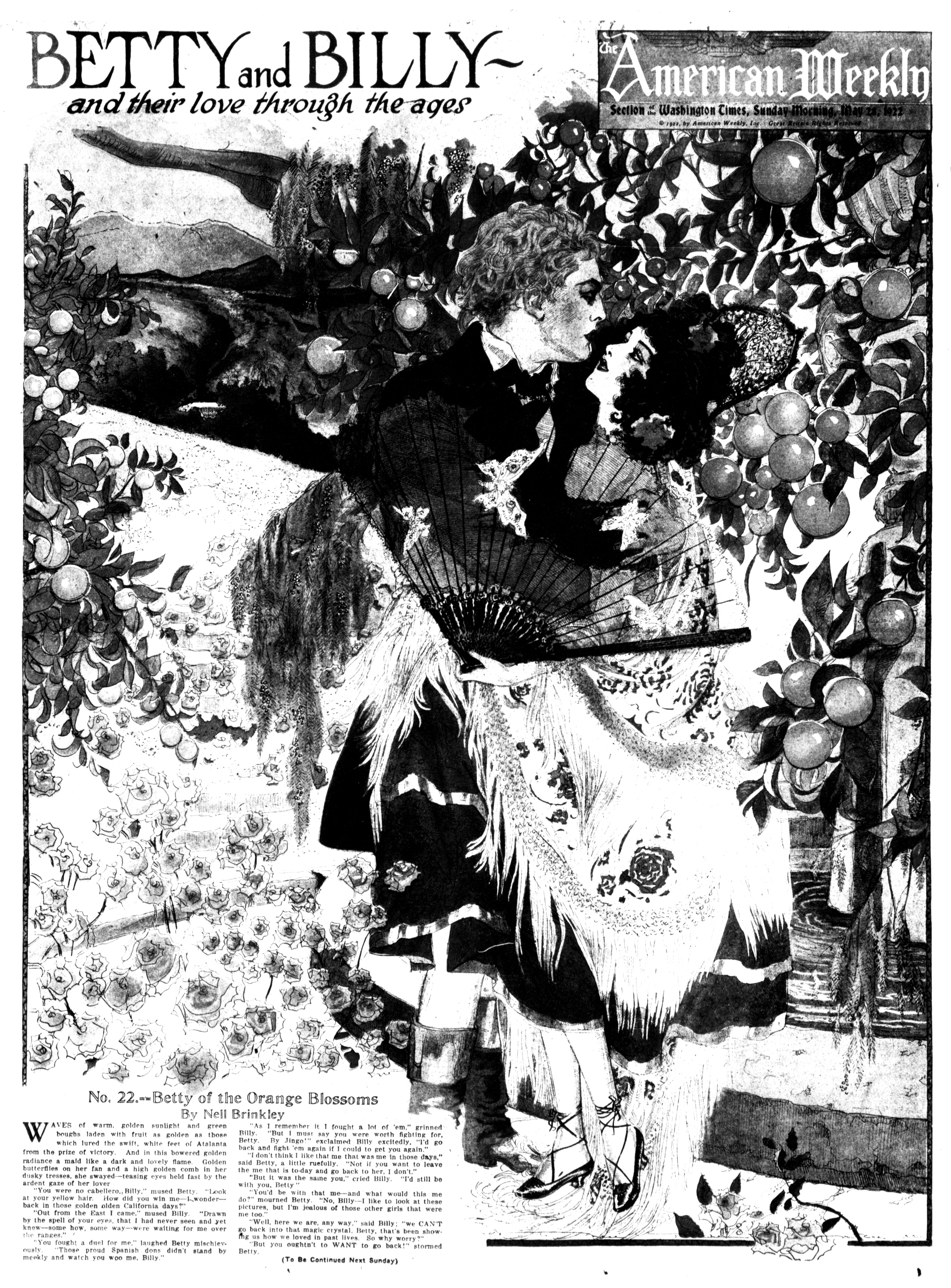
The Washington times., May 28, 1922, SUNDAY MORNING, Page 49

Cissy Patterson, editor of both The Washington Times and the Washington Herald since 1930, leased them from Hearst in 1937. Patterson bought the two papers in 1939, merging them into the Washington Times-Herald. Patterson ran the merged paper from its creation in 1939 until her death in 1948. It was subsequently purchased by Joseph Medill Patterson and Robert McCormick. In 1954, the Times-Herald was purchased by Phillip L. Graham, owner of The Washington Post. For a time, the combined paper was officially known as The Washington Post and Times-Herald. The Times-Herald portion of the nameplate became less and less prominent on a second line in ensuing years, however, and was dropped entirely in 1973.

== See also ==
- Washington Herald (1906–1939)
- Washington Times-Herald
- Newspapers founded in Washington, D.C. during the 18th- and 19th-centuries
- List of newspapers in Washington, D.C.

== Archives, curated collections, and reproductions ==
WorldCat (OCLC)

1. 994500257 (1894–1895) digital
2. 956165476 (1894–1895) digital
3. 1058793340 (1894–1895) digital
4. 710019837 (1902–1939) digital
5. 11987295 (1897–1901) digital
6. 1058847256 (1901–1902) digital
7. 10630160 (1902–1939) digital

Library of Congress Control Number

9. LCCN sn84-26749 (digital versions, searchable online via Chronicling America database)
