= New National Era =

African American newspaper (1870–1874)

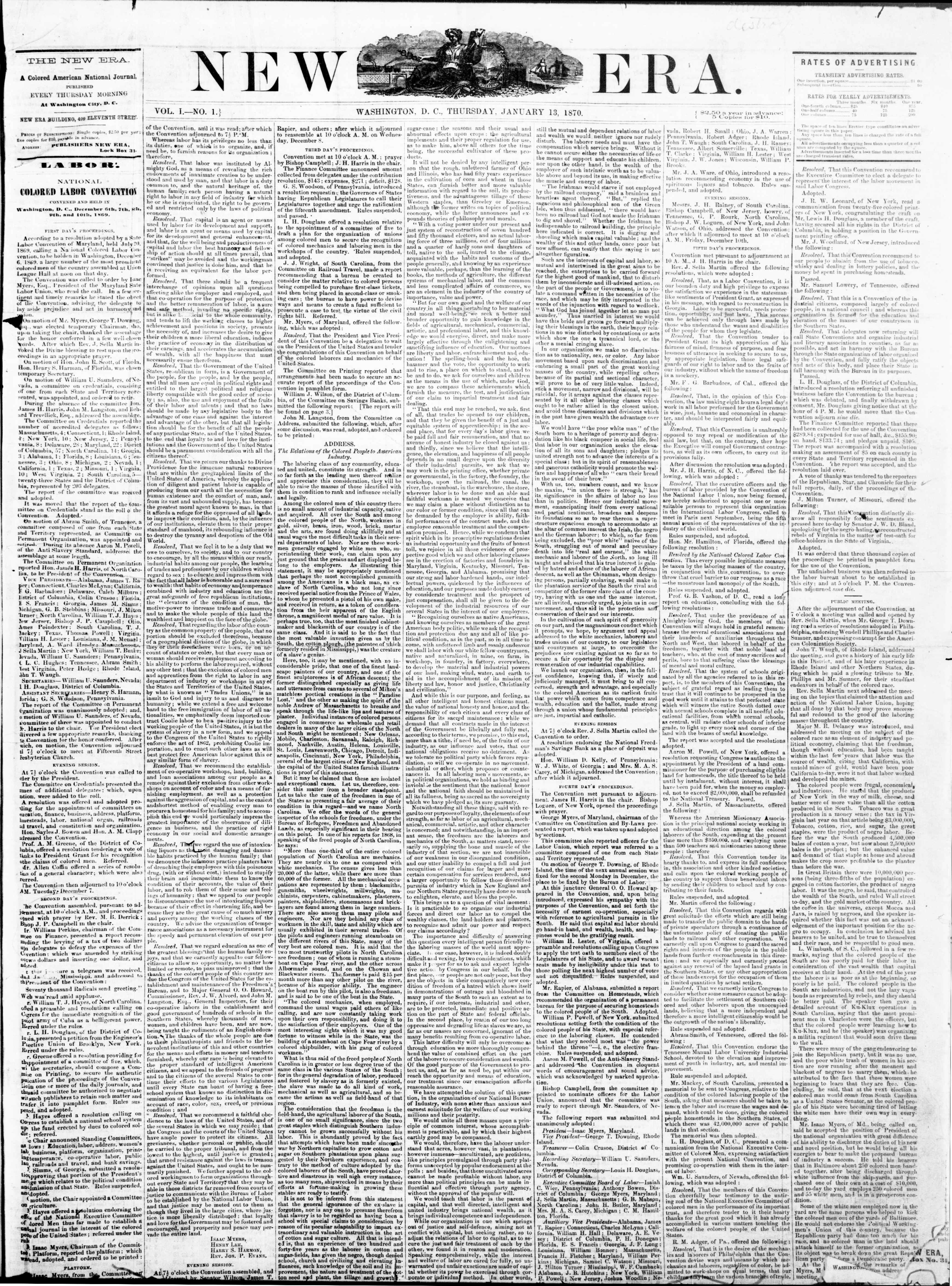
- The paper published its first issue on January 13, 1870.
- Format: Broadsheet
- Publisher: Frederick Douglass
- Editor: Frederick Douglass (1870–1872); Lewis H. Douglass (1873–1874)
- Associate editor: Richard Theodore Greener
- Relaunched: 1870
- Political alignment: Late 19th c. Republican
- City: Washington, D.C.
- Readership: National
- Website: loc.gov/item/sn84026753
- Free online archives: Library of Congress

New National Era (1870–1874) was an African American newspaper, published in Washington, D.C., during the Reconstruction Era in the decade after the American Civil War and the Emancipation Proclamation. Originally known as the New Era, the pioneering abolitionist and writer Frederick Douglass renamed it in 1870 when he became the newspaper's publisher and editor.

The first issue under Douglas was published on January 13, 1870, and was largely devoted to coverage of the Colored National Labor Union, which had convened its inaugural meeting in December 1869. In subsequent issues, Thomas W. Cardozo wrote pseudonymous accounts of his experience in government in Reconstruction-era Mississippi under the name "Civis." Richard Theodore Greener, who had been Harvard College's first Black graduate in 1870, was hired in 1873 as associate editor. Described as a "well conducted" newspaper, aimed at addressing the issues of the black community in D.C., the New National Era focused on issues of Reconstruction, Republican politics of the day, and Black Washington, D.C.

In 1872, Douglass stepped down as editor, and his son Lewis H. Douglass took over from 1873–1874. Richard T. Greener and John A. Cook succeeded him, and the newspaper’s name changed again, this time evolving into the New National Era and Citizen.

== Archives ==
- The New York Heritage Digital Collections
- The Library of Congress

== See also ==
- Newspapers founded in Washington, D.C., during the 18th- and 19th-centuries
