= Washington Times-Herald =

Newspaper formerly published in Washington, D.C.

The Washington Times-Herald (Washington, D.C.)
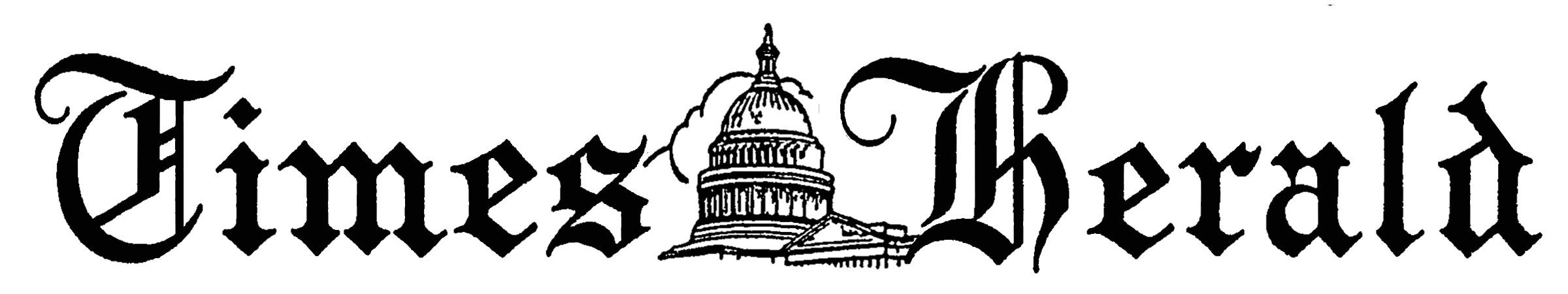

- The March 8, 1940 front page of the Washington Times-Herald
- Type: Daily newspaper
- Format: Broadsheet
- Founded: The Washington Times: (1894–1939); The Washington Herald: (1906–1939); The Washington Times-Herald: (1939–1954)
- Ceased publication: 1954
- Political alignment: Conservative
- Headquarters: Washington, D.C.

Front page of The Washington Times from February 26, 1922, prior to merger

Front page The Washington Herald from December 25, 1922 edition, prior to merger

The Washington Times-Herald (1939–1954) was an American daily newspaper published in Washington, D.C. It was created by Eleanor "Cissy" Patterson of the Medill–McCormick–Patterson family (long-time owners of the Chicago Tribune and the New York Daily News and founding later Newsday on New York's Long Island) when she bought The Washington Times and The Washington Herald from the syndicate newspaper publisher William Randolph Hearst (1863–1951), and merged them. The result was a "24-hour" newspaper, with 10 editions per day, from morning to evening.

== History ==
In 1917, Hearst acquired the old Washington Times. It had been established in 1894 and owned successively by Congressman Charles G. Conn (1844–1931) of Elkhart, Indiana, publisher Stilson Hutchins (1838–1912, previous founder/owner of The Washington Post, 1877–1889), and most recently Frank A. Munsey (1854–1925), a financier, banker and magazine publisher known as the "Dealer in Dailies" and the "Undertaker of Journalism" for his extensive newspaper syndicate. Five years later, he bought the Herald, which had been founded in 1906.

Cissy Patterson, first cousin of Tribune publisher Robert McCormick and younger sister of Daily News publisher Joseph Medill Patterson, was editor of both papers from 1930 on, and leased them from Hearst in 1937. She was eager to buy them outright, and was able to do so in 1939 at the confluence of Hearst's near-bankruptcy caused by the increasing costs of his Hearst Castle in San Simeon, California, and the purchase attempts by the rival Washington Post family of Eugene Meyer (1879–1959) and Phillip L. Graham (1915–1963), who had bought the then bankrupt Post at auction in 1933. Patterson merged the papers into the Times-Herald, which she ran until her death in 1948. Patterson, unlike her cousin, Robert R. McCormick, but like her brother Joe of the New York Daily News, initially supported Roosevelt and the New Deal. The two Patterson papers endorsed the president in 1932, 1936, and 1940 but broke him over foreign policy in 1941.

McCormick had purchased the newspaper following Cissy Patterson's 1948 death. The paper became an "isolationist and archconservative" publication known for sensationalism. McCormick appointed his niece, Ruth "Bazy" McCormick Miller as the publisher of the paper in 1949. He wanted Miller to use the paper to create "an outpost of American principles". When the two came to a parting of the ways over her relationship with one of the paper's editors, Garvin Tankersley, as well as editorial control over the paper, he ordered her to choose between Tankersley and the Tribune Company. As a result, she eloped with Tankersley and resigned from the Times-Herald. She later said, "I understood when I went to the Times-Herald I was to have full control. That control was not given me ... There is some difference in our political beliefs. I have broader Republican views than [McCormick] has. I am for the same people as the colonel, but I am for some more people.

The Washington Times-Herald Building was built by architect Philip Morrisson Jullien.

== Purchase by The Post ==
McCormick tried to run the paper himself, but lost money on the venture, and sold the Times-Herald to The Washington Post in 1954. When he announced the sale, one of the paper's board members insisted that Miller, by then Bazy Tankersley, be given a chance to purchase it, so McCormick gave her 48 hours to match the $10 million asking price. She could not raise the money to do so. In March 1954, the Times-Herald was purchased by Graham, owner of the Post. For a time, the combined paper was officially known as The Washington Post and Times-Herald, but the Post consolidated its market position by discontinuing the rival paper. The Times-Herald portion of the nameplate became less and less prominent on a second line in ensuing years and was dropped entirely in 1973.

== See also ==
- Washington Herald (1906–1939)
- Washington Times (1894–1939)

== Sources ==
- Roberts, Chalmers McGeagh. The Washington Post: The First 100 Years. Boston: Houghton Mifflin, 1977. ISBN 978-0-395-25854-5.
