= Richard Theodore Greener =

American lawyer

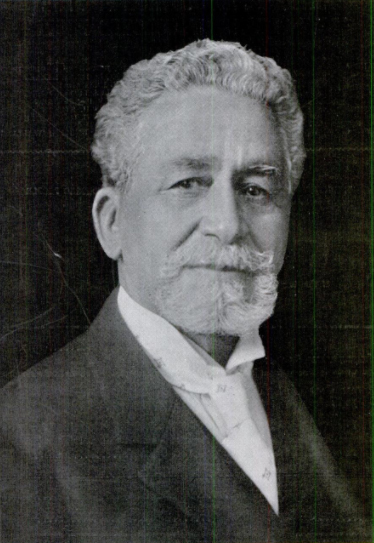
- Greener in 1917

Dean of Howard Law School
- In office 1878 – 1880

Personal details
- Born: January 30, 1844 Philadelphia, Pennsylvania, U.S.
- Died: May 2, 1922 (aged 78) Chicago, Illinois, U.S.
- Resting place: Graceland Cemetery
- Party: Republican
- Children: Belle da Costa Greene and 8 others
- Education: Oberlin College (did not graduate); Phillips Academy Andover; Harvard University (A.B.); University of South Carolina (LL.B.)
- Profession: Professor, Diplomat, Attorney

Richard Theodore Greener (January 30, 1844 – May 2, 1922) was a pioneering African-American scholar, excelling in elocution, philosophy, law and classics in the Reconstruction era. In 1870, he became the first black undergraduate at Harvard University to receive a bachelor's degree. The previous year, Harvard Law School, Harvard Medical School, and the Harvard School of Dental Medicine awarded degrees to their first black graduates in 1869.

After graduating with honors from Harvard, Greener worked as a high school teacher and principal. In 1873, he was recruited by the University of South Carolina (USC) to become the school's first black professor. While on the USC faculty, he enrolled in and graduated from USC's Law School. He also served as associate editor for the New National Era, a newspaper owned and edited by Frederick Douglass. In 1875, Greener became the first black elected to the American Philological Association, the primary academic society for classical studies in North America. In 1876, he was admitted to practice in the Supreme Court of South Carolina, and the following year he was also admitted to the Bar of the District of Columbia. He went on to serve as dean of the Howard University School of Law.

In 1898, he became America's first black diplomat to a white country, serving in Vladivostok, Russia. In 1902, the Chinese government honored him for his service to the Boxer War, and his assistance to Shansi famine sufferers. He served as an American representative during the Russo-Japanese War, but left the diplomatic service in 1905.

In 2018, Phillips Andover honored Greener (Andover, Class of 1865) by renaming the campus quad, the Richard T. Greener Quadrangle. That same year, the University of South Carolina unveiled a nine-foot statue of Greener that stands outside the school's main library, and Harvard established the Greener Scott Scholars Mentorship Program in honor of Greener and Alberta Virginia Scott, the first Black graduate of Radcliffe College. In 2020, the 101st Illinois General Assembly adopted House Resolution 0638 to honor Greener, and in 2021, the Cook County Board of Commissioners (Illinois) passed a similar resolution to salute Greener for his achievements.

== Early life and education ==
Richard Greener was born on January 30, 1844 in Philadelphia, Pennsylvania. His parents were Mary Ann LeBrune, and Richard Wesley Greener, a seaman. His maternal grandfather was Alphonse Josef Le Brune, a “Spaniard from Puerto Rico”. His paternal grandfather, Jacob Greener, was a well-known educator in Baltimore, Maryland.

In 1853, when he was nine years old, Greener moved to Cambridge, Massachusetts, and attended Broadway Grammar School. Seeking fortune in California during the Gold Rush migration, his father left the family and never returned to Cambridge. The younger Greener dropped out of school between the ages of 11 and 14 to help support his family by working odd jobs in the Boston-Cambridge area.

While employed as a porter at the Pavilion Hotel in Boston, he became friendly with Judge Thomas Russell, who gave him access to his personal library, and another hotel guest who taught him French. He also met Oliver Wendell Holmes, Sr., whom he went boating with along the Charles River. Greener worked as a porter and nightwatchman for Augustus Batchelder, a Boston jeweler who would become his mentor and benefactor. Batchelder paid for Greener's tuition at Oberlin Academy and Phillips Andover. He graduated from Andover in 1865.

At the age of 21, Greener was admitted to Harvard in 1865. He struggled academically his freshman year, lived in College House, and withdrew after his first term. He returned to Harvard the following year to complete his studies. He was a member of the Pi Eta Society, known for its dramatic productions; Thayer Club, a cooperative that provided inexpensive food and lodging; and a resident of Stoughton Hall. He was a writer for the ”Harvard Advocate” literary magazine, and was a Class Day speaker at Commencement. He won a Bowdoin Prize for meritorious thesis research and writing, and second place in the Lee Prize for his oratory skills. Greener graduated with honors from Harvard in 1870.

In addition, he earned Bowden Prizes for elocution in his sophomore and senior years, which the Rochester Daily Democrat mentioned in an article on August 16, 1869:

Richard Theodore Greener, a young colored man and a member of the senior class of Harvard College, is giving public readings in Philadelphia. Mr. Greener's history is that of a persevering young man who has succeeded in living down the prejudices against his race and color, and attaining by industry, ability, and good character, a position of which he may well feel proud. He was awarded last year, at Harvard College, the prize for reading, and this year he has drilled two young white men who have likewise obtained prizes in the same branch. His course at Harvard has throughout been honorable. He is the first colored youth who has ever passed through that college.

== Academic career ==
After graduating from Harvard, Greener served as a principal at the Institute for Colored Youth (today Cheyney University) in Philadelphia from September 1870 until December 1872. He succeeded Octavius V. Catto, who was shot in a riot. From January 1 to July 1, 1873, he was principal of the Sumner High School, a colored preparatory school in Washington, D.C. While at Sumner, Greener worked part-time in the U.S. Attorney's office where he first began his legal studies.

After leaving the Sumner School, Greener briefly took a job as associate editor of The New National Era in April 1873, working under editor Frederick Douglass. He was also an associate editor for the National Encyclopedia for American Biography.

=== University of South Carolina ===
In 1873, Greener was recruited to join the faculty at the University of South Carolina (USC), where he was the university's first black professor. He is credited with being the only black professor at a southern university during the Reconstruction era. As a USC professor, he taught Greek, Latin, law, and philosophy courses.

In 1874, he was USC's "Public Day" commencement speaker. His speech, "Charles Sumner, the Idealist, Statesman and Scholar", was a posthumous tribute to his friend, Senator Charles Sumner (MA) (1811 – 1874), and was later published as a paper.

At USC, Greener also served as a university librarian, helping to "reorganize and catalog the library's holdings which were in disarray after the Civil War" and wrote a monograph on the rare books of the library. In 1875, Greener became the first black elected member of the American Philological Association (APA), the primary academic society for classical studies in North America. In 1876, his paper, “The Library of the University of South Carolina: Its Rare and Curious Books,” was accepted for presentation.

While on the USC faculty, he enrolled at the University of South Carolina Law School. He graduated from the law school in 1876, and was admitted to practice law in the Supreme Court of South Carolina on December 20, 1876. He remained on the USC faculty until 1877, when the university was closed by Wade Hampton III during the post-Reconstruction era in South Carolina.

=== Howard Law School ===
Greener moved to Washington and was admitted to the Bar of the District of Columbia on April 14, 1877.

In September 1877, he presented his position paper in open forum at a Congress of the American Social Science Association held at Saratoga Springs, New York.

He took a position as a professor at Howard University Law School and served as dean from 1878 to 1880, succeeding John H. Cooke.

He also worked on a number of famous legal cases. He was associate counsel of Jeremiah M. Wilson in the defense of Samuel L. Perry in April 1880. He was associate counsel for Martin I. Townsend in the defense of Johnson Chesnut Whittaker in May 1880. He assisted Daniel Henry Chamberlain in Whittaker's defense in a subsequent trial.

== Public service and activism ==
From 1876 to 1879, Greener represented South Carolina in the Union League of America and was president of the South Carolina Republican Association in 1887 and was active in freemasonry. In 1875, Greener was appointed by the South Carolina Assembly to a commission to revise the South Carolina school system.

From 1877 to 1879, Greener served as a clerk in the United States Treasury Department.

From 1879 to 1885, he managed the Greener & Cook law firm. In 1883, Greener and Frederick Douglass conducted a public debate over the future of Black leadership and politics. Greener and the rising generation of Black leaders advocated moving away from political parties and white allies, while Douglass denounced them as "croakers." Greener, who nonetheless still respected Douglass's achievements, helped organize a major convention to present Black grievances to the nation. Decades had passed since the Civil War, the Emancipation Proclamation, and years since the passage of the Fourteenth and Fifteenth Amendments, but these advances had been rolled back or left unenforced, while Jim Crow laws spread in the South. Greener joined younger Black leaders in questioning Douglass, who remained loyal to the Republican Party that had first fought for Black freedom but then abandoned the cause. Douglass accused Greener of writing anonymous attacks motivated by "ambition and jealousy" that charged the older leader with "trading off the colored vote of the country for office." Greener wrote that there were two Douglasses, "the one velvety, deprecatory, apologetic — the other insinuating, suggestive damning with shrug, a raised eyebrow, or a look of caution."

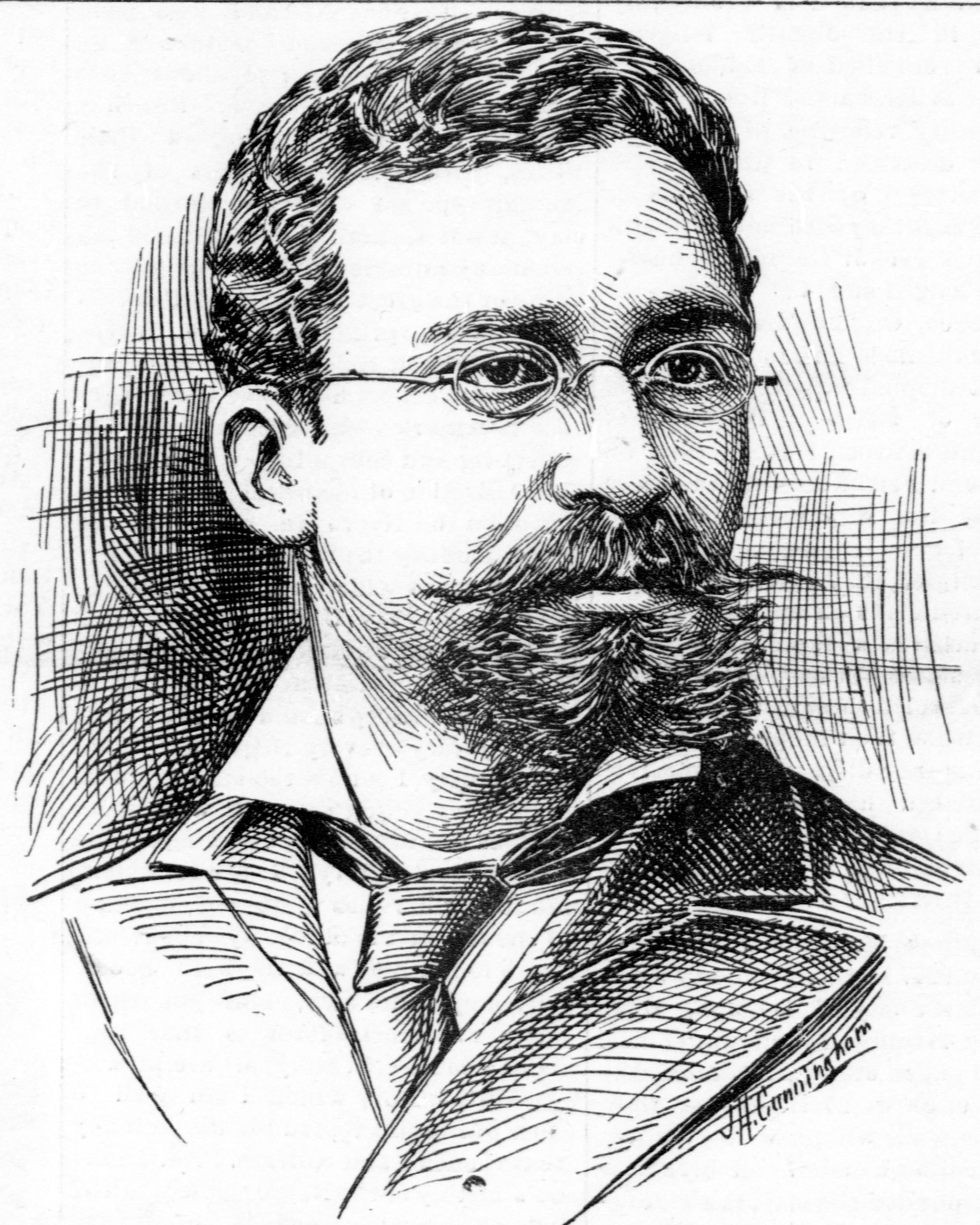
Richard T. Greener circa c. 1887

From 1885 to 1892, Greener served as secretary of the Grant Monument Association, where he led the initial fundraising effort that brought in donations from 90,000 people worldwide to construct Grant's Tomb. From 1885 to 1890, he was chief examiner of the civil service board for New York City and County. In the 1896 election, he served as the head of the Colored Bureau of the Republican Party in Chicago.

After 1892 he continued to work out of an office at 146 Broadway (comer of Liberty Street) formerly used by The Grant Monument Association, undertaking various business ventures including a gold mining company based in Nova Scotia.

In 1894, he published, “The White Problem,” an essay that reframed the “Negro Problem” as one of discrimination practiced by whites who needed to change their behavior.

Just as Greener opposed Douglass, he was on the Washington side of the growing split in the African American world. On the one side was accommodationist, and therefore politically powerful and adequately funded, Booker T. Washington. On the other were Monroe Trotter, W.E.B. DuBois, and their followers, who insisted that under the Constitution they had rights and that those rights should be respected. In July 1906, he joined with DuBois and others to attend the second convention of the Niagara Movement in Harper's Ferry, West Virginia. The Niagara Movement was the immediate predecessor of the NAACP.

=== Diplomat ===
In January 1898, Greener was appointed by President William McKinley as General Consul at Bombay, India, but declined to go after learning of the Bombay plague epidemic. Several months later, he accepted a second appointment as a United States Commercial Agent in Vladivostok, Russia.

In 1902, the Chinese government decorated him with the Order of the Double Dragon for his service to the Boxer War and assistance to Shansi famine sufferers.

He successfully served as an American representative during the Russo-Japanese War but left the diplomatic service and the Vladivostok station in 1905.

== Personal life ==
On September 24, 1874, Greener married Genevieve Ida Fleet, a music teacher and a member of a prominent Washington, D.C. African-American family. The couple had at least five children: Russell Lowell, Mary Louise, and Belle Marion; and two who died in infancy. Greener paid for Belle, Lowell, and Mary to attend college.

Greener maintained at least two residences in New York City: 358 West 58th Street (1889), and 29 West 99th Street (1894).

Genevieve and Richard Greener separated in the 1890s. After the separation, his former wife changed the family surname to “Greene”, two of his children adopted variations of the middle name “da Costa”, and the family passed as white. Belle Marion Greener, who was renamed Belle da Costa Greene, is recognized as “one of the most prominent librarians in American history”, primarily for her role as J. P. Morgan's personal librarian.

In 1898, while working as an American consular official in Vladivostok, Russia, Greener became reacquainted with Mishi Kawashima, a diplomatic assistant who was fluent in Russian, English and Japanese. The common-law couple had three children together, a daughter and two sons. In 1906, he left Vladivostok and his new family. Greener's great-grandson through his daughter Olive is the neo-Nazi Charles Bausman.

== Later life and death ==
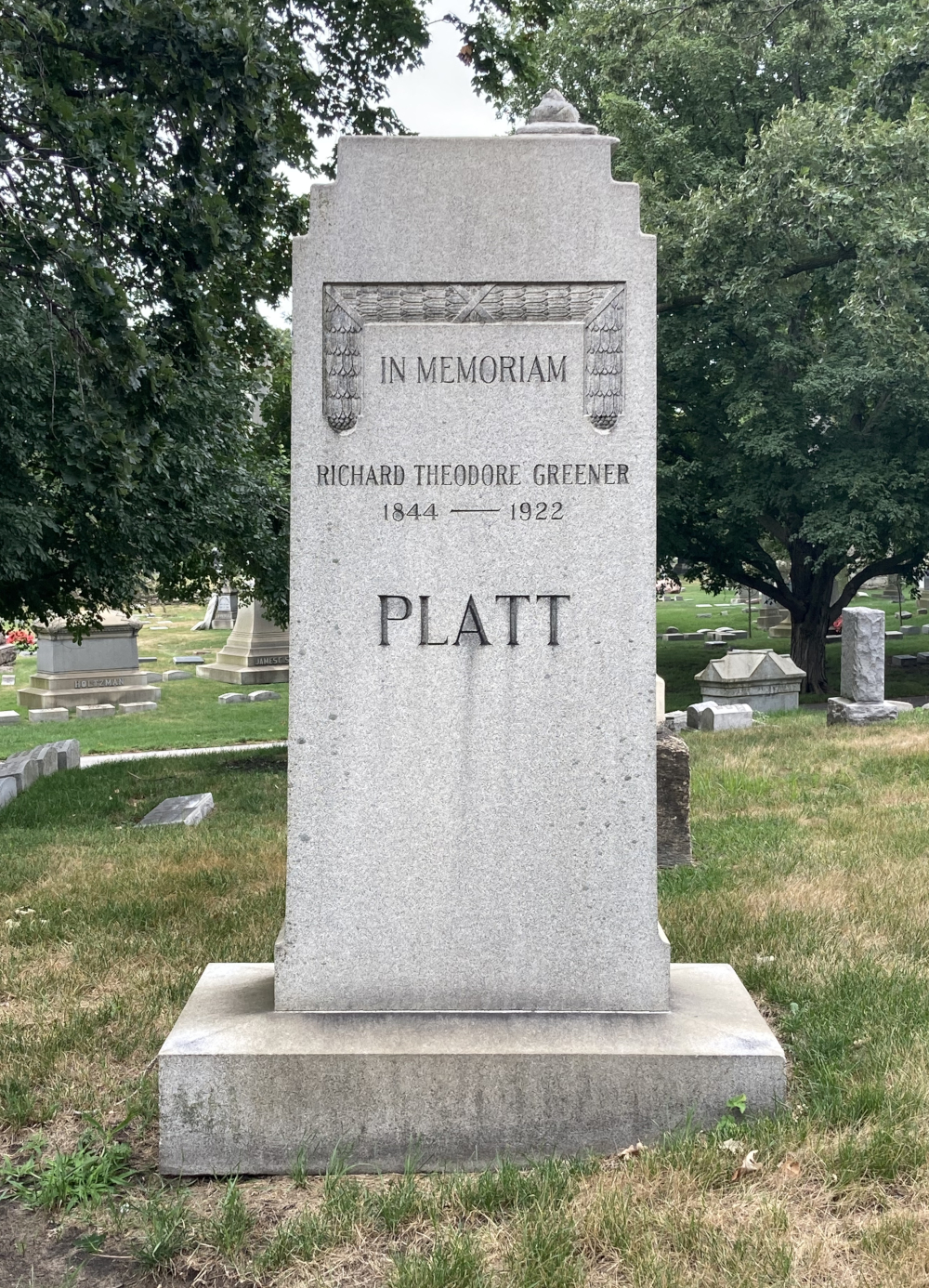
Greener's grave at Graceland Cemetery

By 1907, Greener was in semi-retirement and residing at 5237 Ellis Avenue in Chicago, Illinois. That same year, he received an honorary degree from Howard University.

He served as a special agent and executive with an insurance firm and was a devoted author and lecturer. He was the president of a literary club and vice president of an anthropological society that he described as, “My Church”.

He maintained a long-distance correspondence relationship with one of his daughters, Mishiyo (“Olive”), until his death.

He died of natural causes in Chicago on May 2, 1922, aged 78. He was buried at Graceland Cemetery.

== Legacy ==
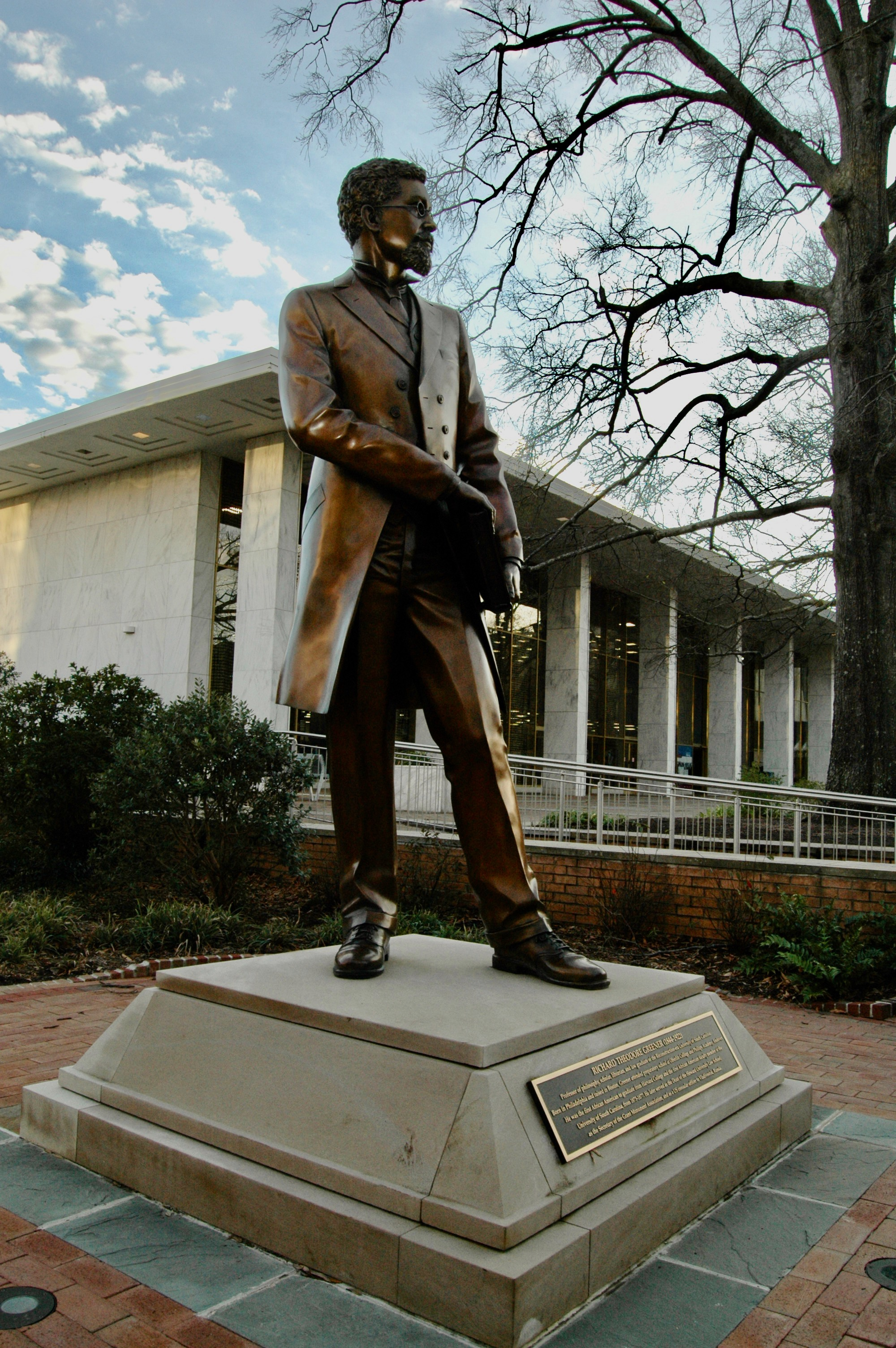
Richard T. Greener, University of South Carolina

Greener's legacy is evident at several institutions. His papers are housed in the New York Public Library (1870 - 1918) and the University of South Carolina Libraries (1876–1919). The following is a partial list of his legacy recognitions.

- 1983—The University of South Carolina Alumni Association's Black Alumni Council establishes the Richard T. Greener Scholarship for incoming freshman.
- 1984 --Larry Francis Lebby painted a portrait of Greener, which is on display at the University of South Carolina.
- 1989 -- Phillips Andover established the Richard T. Greener 1865 Endowed Scholarship for underrepresented students of color.
- 2009—Greener's Harvard diploma and other personal papers were rediscovered in an attic of an abandoned home on the South Side of Chicago by a member of a demolition crew.
- 2016 -- Harvard unveiled a portrait of Greener in Annenberg Hall that was painted by Stephen E. Coit ’71. The painting was commissioned as part of the university' Portraiture Project and overseen by the Harvard Foundation for Intercultural and Race Relations.
- February 21, 2018 -- University of South Carolina unveiled a nine-foot statue of Greener that stands outside the Thomas Cooper Library.
- 2018 -- The University of South Carolina School of Law presented the exhibit "Documents of Richard T. Greener, an Early African-American Lawyer in South Carolina" in the law library.
- 2018—Harvard established the Greener Scott Scholars Mentorship Program in honor of Greener and Alberta Virginia Scott, the first Black graduate of Radcliffe College.
- 2018—Phillips Andover renamed its campus quad the Richard T. Greener Quadrangle to laud him as “an intellectual force and a visionary leader whose character continued to blossom during his time at Andover.”
- 2020—The 101st Illinois General Assembly adopted House Resolution 0638 (sponsored by Rep. Kambium Buckner) to commemorate Greener and his career accomplishments.
- 2021—The Cook County Board of Commissioners (Illinois) passed a resolution to salute Greener for his contributions.
