= Harry Post Godwin =

American newspaper editor

Harry Post Godwin (February 10, 1857 – March 30, 1900) was an American newspaper editor. He was born in Binghamton, New York. At a young age he moved to Washington, D.C., where he was educated. At age 17, he began working at the National Republican, where he quickly became chief editor. He worked there for seven years until 1881, when he became city editor at The Washington Star, where he worked for nearly 20 years.

To test William Price, Godwin sent him to the White House to find a story, and he came back with a good headline which started a new form of journalism directed at uncovering the White House.

After resigning from The Washington Star in 1897, Godwin went to New York to take a high-ranking position in the Columbia Phonograph Company.

== Personal life ==
Godwin is the son of a Union Army soldier who disappeared in the Civil War, and grandson of Abraham Godwin Jr.

He married Annie Falconer Stoppard on April 9, 1880. He had four sons: Earl Godwin (radio and newspaperman), Harold Parke Godwin Sr. (writer, actor), Frank Godwin (Illustrator, cartoonist), and Stuart Godwin (newspaperman). He had many grandchildren, including writer and author, Harold Parke Godwin, Jr.

== Death ==
In the summer of 1898, Godwin fell onto the gunwale of a boat, severely injuring his lungs. He spent his last months in the hospital struggling to recover. He seemed to have died peacefully, as he was doing well and had just eaten breakfast and heard the day's news when the nurse left.

He died in Bridgeport, Connecticut, and his remains were brought to Washington, D.C. His funeral was held at the St. Mark's Episcopal Church, and he was buried at Rock Creek Cemetery.
