= National Republican (newspaper) =

Daily newspaper in Washington, D.C., USA

Coordinates: 38.895339°N 77.029790°W

- Type: Daily newspaper (except Sunday)
- Founder: William J. Murtagh
- Publisher: Lewis Clephane & Co.
- Editor: Harry Post Godwin
- Founded: November 1, 1860
- Ceased publication: June 1, 1888
- Political alignment: Republican
- Language: American English
- Headquarters: southwest corner of Pennsylvania Avenue and 13th Street
- City: Washington, D.C.
- Country: United States
- Circulation: 3,000 (as of 1883)
- ISSN: 2158-8899
- OCLC number: 8791688

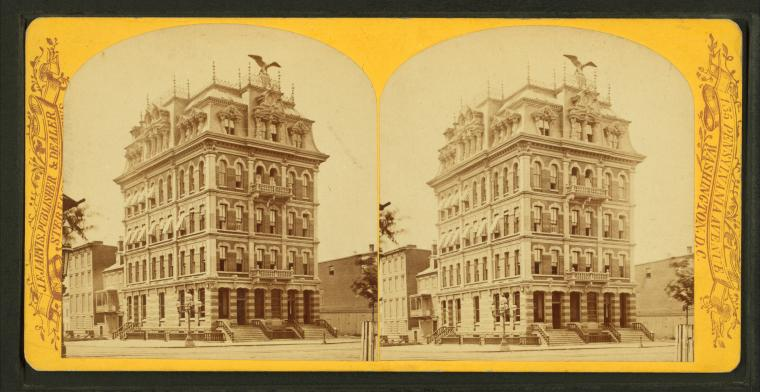
The "Republican" Building was built in 1871 at the southwest corner of Pennsylvania Avenue and 13th Street NW. It was demolished after a fire in 1916.

The National Republican (1860–1888) was an American, English-language daily newspaper published in Washington, D.C.

== History ==
The paper was founded in November 1860 upon the election of Abraham Lincoln as the first United States President from the Republican Party. It was started by newspaperman William J. Murtagh, who had been with the Abolitionist National Era, with investment from Hanscom and Weston, to be a pro-Lincoln administration paper. Though most associated with Murtagh, the paper's additional founders were Lewis Clephane, Martin Buell, and William Blanchard. Clephane later wrote that the paper was started "as a necessity, to represent the Republican Party of the city, and not with any hope of being remunerative."

Murtagh sold to Almon M. Clapp in 1877. Clapp, who had founded the Buffalo Express in 1846, had most recently been Public Printer of the United States. He owned the paper until 1880. A group headed by Elias W. Fox bought the paper in 1885 for $50,000. It was later bought by Stilson Hutchins and merged into The Washington Post in June 1888.

Harry Post Godwin became Chief Editor at the age of 17. He served until 1881.

In 1883, Rowell's American Newspaper Directory listed the paper's estimated circulation as in the range of 3,000.

== Lineage and references ==
- "The National Republican (1860–62)". Chronicling America, Library of Congress., OCLC 8791688, ISSN 2158-8899
- "Daily National Republican (1862-1866)". Chronicling America, Library of Congress., OCLC 13879073, ISSN 2158-2831
- "The National Republican (1866-1870)". Chronicling America, Library of Congress., OCLC 13880324, ISSN 2159-3841
- "Daily National Republican (1870-1872)". Chronicling America, Library of Congress., OCLC 13888533, ISSN 2158-2858
- "National Republican (1872-1888)". Chronicling America, Library of Congress., OCLC 13891753, ISSN 2151-4437
