= Murphy =

- Pronunciation: /ˈmɜːrfi/
- Language: English

Origin
- Language: Irish
- Meaning: 'sea warrior'
- Region of origin: Ireland

Other names
- Variant forms: Murchadh, Murphey, MacMurphy, Morphy, O'Morchoe, O'Murphy, Ó Murchú, Murpy, Murphree

Murphy is a surname of Irish origin meaning 'sea warrior'.

== Origins and variants ==
The surname is a variant of two Irish surnames: Ó Murchadha/Ó Murchadh (descendant of Murchadh), and Mac Murchaidh/Mac Murchadh (son of Murchadh) derived from the Irish personal name Murchadh, which meant sea-warrior or sea-battler (muir meaning sea and cath meaning battle).

According to historian C. Thomas Cairney, the O'Murphys were one of the chiefly families of the Uí Ceinnselaig who in turn were a tribe from the Dumnonii or Laigin who were the third wave of Celts to settle in Ireland during the first century BC. The O'Murphys as one of the chiefly families of the Uí Ceinnselaig is supported by John O'Hart in his 1892 Irish Pedigrees; or, The Origin and Stem of The Irish Nation.

Murchadh is reported to have been gripped with a boiling awful rage, an extreme elevation and greatness of spirit and intellect when he joined the middle of the action and prepared to assail the foreign invaders, the Danes, after they had repulsed the Dal gCais. A gallantry and championship bird rose inside him and fluttered above his head and on his breath.

In modern Irish, Ó Murchú or Mac Murchú rather than Mac/Ó Murchadha, is used.

Murphy is the most common surname in Ireland, the fourteenth most common surname in Northern Ireland, and the sixty-fourth most common surname in the United States.

=== Folklore and legends ===
Folklore in some regions depicts Murphys as protectors of local communities and maritime activities. Tales of heroic deeds, bravery in battle, and protection of fishing routes appear in oral histories, particularly in counties Cork, Kerry, and Mayo. The Murphy name is sometimes linked to legends of sea battles and coastal defense, reinforcing its Murchadh origin.

=== Modern distribution and diaspora ===
Murphy remains the most common surname in Ireland and is widespread throughout the Irish diaspora, especially in the United States, United Kingdom, Canada, and Australia. Its frequency has made it a widely recognized symbol of Irish heritage abroad.

== People with the surname ==
=== Men ===
- Aaron Murphy (born 1988), English rugby league player
- Andrae Murphy (born 1986), American football player and coach
- Anthony Murphy (cricketer) (born 1962), English cricketer
- Arthur Murphy (disambiguation), multiple people
- Audie Murphy (1925–1971), American war hero and actor
- Austin J. Murphy (1927–2024), American politician
- Barnes Murphy (born 1947), Irish Gaelic footballer
- Ben Murphy (born 1942), American actor
- Benjamin Franklin Murphy (1867–1938), American politician
- Bernard D. Murphy (1841–1911), Canadian-born American politician
- Bos Murphy (1924–2000), New Zealand boxer
- Brian Murphy (disambiguation), multiple people
- Buddy Murphy, Australian professional wrestler
- Byron Murphy (born 1998), American football player
- Byron Murphy II (born 2002), American football player
- Caleb Murphy (born 1999), American football player
- Calvin Murphy (born 1948), American basketball player
- Carl Murphy (born 1979), New Zealand snowboarder
- Carl J. Murphy (1889–1967), American journalist, publisher, civil rights activist, and educator
- Charles Murphy (disambiguation), multiple people
- Chris Murphy (disambiguation), multiple people
- Ciarán Murphy, Irish politician
- Cillian Murphy (born 1976), Irish actor
- Colin Murphy (disambiguation), multiple people
- Colm Murphy (1952–2023), Irish alleged suspect in the Omagh bombing
- Connor Murphy (born 1993), American ice hockey player
- Conor Murphy, Sinn Féin politician in Northern Ireland
- Curtis Murphy (born 1975), Canadian ice hockey player
- Dale Murphy (born 1956), American retired baseball player
- Dale D. Murphy, professor at Georgetown University
- Daniel Murphy (disambiguation), multiple people
- Darren Murphy (born 1985), Irish footballer
- Darren Murphy (Australian rules footballer) (born 1964)
- Darren Murphy (1961–2012), bassist with the British punk rock/post-punk band Wasted Youth
- Daryl Murphy, Irish football player
- David Murphy (disambiguation), multiple people
- Derek Murphy (born 1968), American rapper better known as Sadat X
- Dick Murphy (born 1942), American retired Republican politician
- Dominick Murphy (c.1918–2009), Irish Labour Party politician and trade union official
- Donald E. Murphy (born 1960), American Republican politician
- Donnie Murphy (born 1983), American baseball player
- Eddie Murphy (disambiguation), multiple people
- Edward Murphy (disambiguation), multiple people
- Elliott Murphy (born 1949), American singer/songwriter
- Erik Murphy (born 1990), American–Finnish basketball player
- Everett J. Murphy (1852–1922), politician
- Francis Murphy (disambiguation), multiple people
- Frank Murphy (disambiguation), multiple people
- Fred Murphy (disambiguation), multiple people
- Gary Murphy (1972), Irish professional golfer
- Gary Murphy (1948), New Zealand cricketer
- Geoff Murphy (1938–2018), New Zealand filmmaker
- Geoffrey Mostyn Murphy (1922–2011), Australian boxer, better known as Tommy Burns
- George Murphy (1902–1992), American dancer, actor, and Republican Senator
- Gerard Murphy (disambiguation), multiple people
- Gerry Murphy (disambiguation), multiple people
- Glen Murphy (1957), British actor
- Grayson Murphy (disambiguation), multiple people
- Harold Lloyd Murphy (1927–2022), American judge
- Henry Murphy (disambiguation), multiple people
- Isaac Murphy (1802–1882), Republican Governor of Arkansas
- Isaac Burns Murphy (1861–1896), American Hall-of-Fame jockey
- Isaiah Murphy, a.k.a. Shinsaku Enomoto, (born 1998), Japanese basketball player
- Jack Murphy (disambiguation), multiple people
- Jacob Murphy (born 1995), English footballer
- James Murphy (disambiguation), multiple people, people named James or Jimmy
- Jim Murphy (disambiguation), multiple people
- John Murphy (disambiguation), multiple people
- Joseph Murphy (disambiguation), multiple people
- Josh Murphy (born 1995), English footballer
- Kevin Murphy (disambiguation), multiple people
- Kieran Murphy (disambiguation), multiple people
- Lambert Murphy (1885–?), American operatic tenor
- Landau Eugene Murphy Jr. (born 1974), American singer, winner of season 6 of America's Got Talent
- Larry Murphy (disambiguation), multiple people
- Lawrence Murphy (disambiguation), multiple people
- Lionel Murphy (1922–1986), Australian politician and jurist
- Loren E. Murphy (1882–1963), American jurist
- Luke Murphy (born 1999), American baseball player
- Marc Murphy (footballer) (born 1987), Australian rules footballer
- Mark Murphy (disambiguation), multiple people
- Martin Murphy (disambiguation), multiple people
- Mason Murphy (born 2002), American football player
- Matt Murphy (disambiguation), multiple people
- Maurice Murphy (actor) (1913–1978), American actor
- Michael Murphy (disambiguation), multiple people, people named Michael, Mick or Mike
- Mickey Murphy (born 1985), Gaelic footballer
- Miles Murphy (born 1967), Australian sprinter
- Myles Murphy (disambiguation), multiple people
- Nicholas Murphy (disambiguation), multiple people
- Nick Murphy (disambiguation), multiple people
- Oakes Murphy (1849–1908), two-time Governor of Arizona Territory
- Owen Murphy (disambiguation), multiple people
- Pat Murphy (disambiguation), multiple people
- Patrick Murphy (disambiguation), multiple people
- Paul Murphy (disambiguation), multiple people
- Peter Murphy (disambiguation), multiple people
- Phil Murphy (disambiguation), multiple people, people named Phil, Philip or Phillip
- Richard Murphy (disambiguation), multiple people, people named Richard, some nicknamed Dick
- Robert Murphy (disambiguation), multiple people, people named Robert, Rob, Bob or Bobby
- Roger P. Murphy, American legislator and jurist
- Ryan Murphy (disambiguation), multiple people
- Scott Murphy, American entrepreneur and politician
- Scott Murphy (video game designer), a programmer behind the Space Quest series
- Sean Murphy (disambiguation), multiple people
- Sebastian Murphy (Captain, Founding Father of Utuado, Puerto Rico), b. circa 1696
- Shaun Murphy (disambiguation), multiple people
- Shawn Murphy (disambiguation), multiple people
- Stephen Murphy (disambiguation), multiple people
- Storm Murphy (born 1999), American basketball player
- Sydney Murphy (born 1960), Vincentian retired cricketer
- Thomas Murphy (disambiguation), multiple people, people named Thomas, Tom, or Tommy
- Timothy Murphy (disambiguation), multiple people, people named Timothy or Tim
- Trent Murphy (2013), outside linebacker in the National Football League; played for the Washington Redskins and Buffalo Bills
- Troy Murphy, power forward for the Boston Celtics
- Vincent B. Murphy, New York State Comptroller 1925–1926
- Vincent J. Murphy, Mayor of Newark 1941–1949
- Wendell H. Murphy, American politician
- William Murphy (disambiguation), multiple people,
- Yale Murphy (1869–1906), American baseball player
- Yo Murphy (born 1971), American former football player

=== Women ===
- Ashling Murphy (1998–2022), Irish teacher; suspected of being murdered
- Alexis Murphy, American murder victim
- Amee-Leigh Murphy Crowe (born 1995), Irish rugby sevens and union player
- Annie Murphy (born 1986), Canadian actress
- Brittany Murphy (1977–2009), American actress
- Camay Calloway Murphy (1927–2024), American educator
- Carolyn Murphy (born 1975), American model
- Claudia Quigley Murphy (1863–1941), American journalist, economic consultant, advisory counsel, author
- Dervla Murphy (1931–2022), travel writer
- Diana E. Murphy (1934–2018), American judge
- Donna Murphy (born 1958), American Tony Award-winning actress
- Elizabeth Murphy Moss (née Martha Elizabeth Murphy; 1917–1998), American journalist
- Elizabeth Murphy Taaffe (née Elizabeth Yuba Murphy; 1844–1875), American rancher, settler in California
- Élodie Murphy-Gauthier, Quebec politician
- Erin Murphy (disambiguation), multiple people
- Gail C. Murphy, Canadian computer scientist
- Gillian Murphy (born 1979), principal dancer at American Ballet Theatre
- Irma A. Murphy, Canadian nurse
- Jess Murphy, New Zealand-born chef based in Galway, Ireland
- Jill Murphy (1949–2021), British author and illustrator of children's books
- Julie Murphy (singer) (born 1961), Welsh singer
- Julie Murphy (author) (born 1985), American novelist
- Kelleigh Murphy, American politician
- Kelly Murphy (born 1977), American author and illustrator
- Kelly Noonan Murphy (born 1974 or 1975), American politician
- Laura Murphy (politician), American politician
- Laura W. Murphy (born 1955), American civil rights activist and lobbyist
- Madeline Wheeler Murphy (1922–2007), American community advocate and civil rights activist
- Margaret Mary Healy Murphy (1833–1907), American Catholic nun
- Marsia Geldert-Murphey, American politician
- Mary Murphy (disambiguation), multiple people
- Maureen Murphy (ice hockey) (born 1999), American ice hockey player
- Patricia Murphy (disambiguation), multiple people
- Peta Murphy (1973–2023), Australian politician
- Róisín Murphy (born 1973), Irish electronica singer, songwriter, and producer
- Shaun Murphy (singer) (born 1978), a.k.a. Stoney, American singer
- Stephanie Murphy (born 1978), Vietnamese-American politician
- Stephanie J. Murphy, American veterinary scientist
- Tammy Murphy (born 1965), American banker
- Vashti Turley Murphy (1884–1960), American educator, community leader, and one of the founders of Delta Sigma Theta
- Yi Lu Murphey, American electrical engineer

=== Fictional characters ===
- Alex Murphy, policeman who was transformed into RoboCop
- Yidhari Murphy, from the video game Zenless Zone Zero

== See also ==
- Justice Murphy (disambiguation)
- Murph (disambiguation)
- Irish clans
