= Senator Murphy =

Senator Murphy or Murphey may refer to:

== Members of the Northern Irish Senate ==
- Edward Sullivan Murphy (1880–1945), Northern Irish Senator in 1929

== Members of the United States Senate ==
- Chris Murphy (born 1973), U.S. Senator from Connecticut since 2013
- Edward Murphy Jr. (1836–1911), U.S. Senator from New York from 1893 to 1899
- George Murphy (1902–1992), U.S. Senator from California from 1965 to 1971
- Maurice J. Murphy Jr. (1927–2002), U.S. Senator from New Hampshire from 1961 to 1962
- Richard L. Murphy (1875–1936), U.S. Senator from Iowa from 1933 to 1936

== United States state senate members ==
- Archibald Murphey (1777–1832), North Carolina State Senate
- Arthur Murphy (Idaho politician) (1898–1977), Idaho State Senate
- Austin Murphy (born 1927), Pennsylvania State Senate
- Charles Murphey (1799–1861), Georgia State Senate
- Charles Frederick Murphy (1875–1934), New York State Senate
- Dennis Murphy (Wisconsin politician) (fl. 1840s–1850s), Wisconsin State Senate
- George A. Murphy (1923–2015), New York State Senate
- Henry C. Murphy (1810–1882), New York State Senate
- James A. Murphy (1889–1939), Michigan State Senate
- James W. Murphy (politician) (1852–1913), Wisconsin State Senate
- Jeremiah Henry Murphy (1835–1893), Iowa State Senate
- John McLeod Murphy (1827–1871), New York State Senate
- John R. Murphy (1856–1932), Massachusetts State Senate
- John Murphy (Nebraska politician) (1918–2010), Nebraska State Senate
- Joseph L. Murphy (1907–1973), Massachusetts State Senate
- Laura Murphy (politician) (fl. 2010s), Illinois State Senate
- Matt Murphy (Illinois politician) (born 1970), Illinois State Senate
- Michael C. Murphy (New York politician) (1839–1903), New York State Senate
- Peter P. Murphy (1801–1880), New York State Senate
- Raymond M. Murphy (born 1927), Michigan State Senate
- Rick Murphy (fl. 2000s–2010s), Arizona State Senate
- Roger P. Murphy (1923–2009), Wisconsin State Senate
- Seba Murphy (1788–1856), Michigan State Senate
- Steve Murphy (politician) (born 1957), Minnesota State Senate
- Terrence Murphy (New York politician) (born 1966), New York State Senate
- Terry Murphy (American politician), Montana State Senate
- Tim Murphy (Pennsylvania politician) (1952–2026), Pennsylvania State Senate
- Wendell H. Murphy (fl. 1960s–2000s), North Carolina State Senate

== See also ==
- Murphy
