= Jimmy Murphy =

Jimmy Murphy may refer to:

- Jimmy Murphy (cartoonist) (1891–1965), cartoonist of the Toots and Casper comic strip
- Jimmy Murphy (playwright) (born 1962), Irish playwright
- Jimmy Murphy (country musician) (1925–1981), American country musician
- Jimmy Murphy (racing driver) (1894–1924), American racing driver
- Jimmy Murphy (footballer) (1910–1989), Welsh football player and manager

== Others ==
- Jimmy Barry-Murphy (born 1954), former Irish hurler, Gaelic footballer and association footballer
- Jimmy Murphy (song), an Irish folk song

== See also ==
- James Murphy (disambiguation)
  - Jim Murphy (disambiguation)
  - Jamie Murphy (disambiguation)
