= James Murphy =

James Murphy may refer to:

== The arts ==
- James Murphy (Irish novelist) (1839–1921)
- James Cavanah Murphy (1760–1814), Irish architect and antiquary
- James Vincent Murphy (1880–1946), translated Hitler's Mein Kampf into English
- James Murphy (electronic musician) (born 1970), American, leader of LCD Soundsystem
- James Murphy (guitarist) (born 1967), American heavy metal guitarist

== Politics and law ==
- James Murphy (Irish judge) (1823–1901), Judge of the High Court of Justice in Ireland
- James Murphy (Canadian politician) (1872–1921), lawyer and politician in British Columbia, Canada
- James Murphy (Irish politician) (1887–1961), Irish Sinn Féin & Cumann na nGaedhael politician from Louth
- James Murphy (New South Wales politician), member of the New South Wales Legislative Council and Mayor of Sydney
- James A. Murphy III (born c. 1961), Former District Attorney, current County Court Judge, Saratoga County, New York
- James A. Murphy (1889–1939), member of the Michigan Senate, 1933–1939
- James E. Murphy (1897–1986), American judge
- James J. Murphy (1898–1962), United States Representative from New York
- James Laurence Murphy (1860–1942), Australian politician and member of the Victorian Legislative Assembly
- James M. Murphy (born 1969), Massachusetts State Representative
- James R. Murphy (1904–1986), American attorney and counterintelligence chief for the Office of Strategic Services during WW2
- James W. Murphy (politician) (1852–1913), Wisconsin state legislator
- James William Murphy (1858–1927), United States Representative from Wisconsin
- James Murphy (Victorian politician) (1821–1888), brewer and politician in colonial Victoria

== Sports ==
- James Murphy (runner) (1880–1962), Irish runner, Olympic finalist in 1908
- James Murphy (cricketer) (1911–1984), Australian cricketer
- James Murphy (gridiron football) (born 1959), retired American and Canadian football player
- James Murphy (soccer, born 1936) (1936–2025), American soccer player
- James Murphy (soccer, born 1997), American soccer player
- James Murphy (rugby union) (born 1995), South African rugby sevens player

== Other ==
- James Bumgardner Murphy (1884–1950), American pathologist and cancer researcher
- James Murphy (bishop) (1744–1824), Bishop of Clogher
- James Murphy (architect) (1834–1907), Irish-American architect
- James Ford Murphy, head of animation at Pixar Animation Studios
- James D. "Murph" Murphy (born 1964), founder and CEO, Afterburner Inc.

== See also ==
- James Francis Murphy (disambiguation)
- Jamie Murphy (disambiguation)
- Jim Murphy (disambiguation)
- Jimmy Murphy (disambiguation)
- Séamus Murphy (disambiguation), Irish equivalent
- Murphy's Brewery, founder James Jeremiah Murphy (1825–1897)
