= Edward Murphy =

Edward, Ed, Eddie, Ned, or Ted Murphy may refer to:

== Military ==
- Edward F. Murphy (died 1908), U.S. Army corporal, Medal of Honor recipient for actions during the Indian Wars in 1879
- Edward Murphy (Medal of Honor) (died 1924), U.S. Army private, Medal of Honor recipient for actions during the Indian Wars in 1869
- Edward R. Murphy (naval officer) (born 1937), U.S. Navy officer, executive officer of the USS Pueblo

== Politics and law ==
- Edward Murphy (Canadian senator) (1818–1895), Canadian senator
- Edward Murphy Jr. (1836–1911), U.S. senator from New York, and mayor of Troy, New York
- Edward Murphy (Ontario MPP) (fl. 1929-1934), Canadian politician who was Progressive Conservative MPP for St. Patrick
- Edward Sullivan Murphy (1880–1945), Northern Irish politician
- Edward Preston Murphy (1904–1958), U.S. federal judge
- Edward Murphy (Minnesota politician), U.S. politician from Minnesota

== Sports ==
- Ned Murphy (fl. 1880s), Irish sportsman
- Ed Murphy (pitcher) (1877–1935), American baseball player for the Philadelphia Phillies
- Ed Murphy (first baseman) (1918–1991), American baseball player for the Philadelphia Phillies
- Edward Murphy (cricketer) (1921–2020), English cricketer
- Ed Murphy (soccer) (1930–2005), Scottish-born soccer player, played for the U.S. national team, 1955–1969
- Ed Murphy (basketball, born 1941) (1941–2020), American college basketball coach
- Ted Murphy (Australian footballer) (born 1947), Australian rules footballer
- Ed Murphy (basketball, born 1956), American basketball player
- Edward Murphy (rower) (born 1971), American rower
- Ed Murphy (rugby league) (born 1992), Australian rugby league player

== Others ==
- Edward Murphy (bishop) (1651–1728), Irish Roman Catholic Archbishop of Dublin
- Edward Henry Murphy (c.1796–1847), Irish painter
- Edward A. Murphy Jr. (1918–1990), American aerospace engineer, namesake of "Murphy's Law"
- Edward A. Murphy (chemist) (fl. 1920s–1930s), Dunlop researcher credited with the invention of latex foam
- Ed Murphy (activist) (born 1945), American activist
- Edward Regan "Eddie" Murphy (born 1961) American comedian and actor
- Edward H. Murphy (fl. 1970s–2000s), American businessman, executive of the American Petroleum Institute
- Edward Francis Murphy (1892–1975), American playwright, novelist, educator, and Catholic priest

== See also ==
- Edward Murphy Markham (1877–1950), U.S. Army general
- Eddie Murphy (disambiguation)
- Edward Murray (disambiguation)
