= Weeden Wetmore =

Chemung County District Attorney

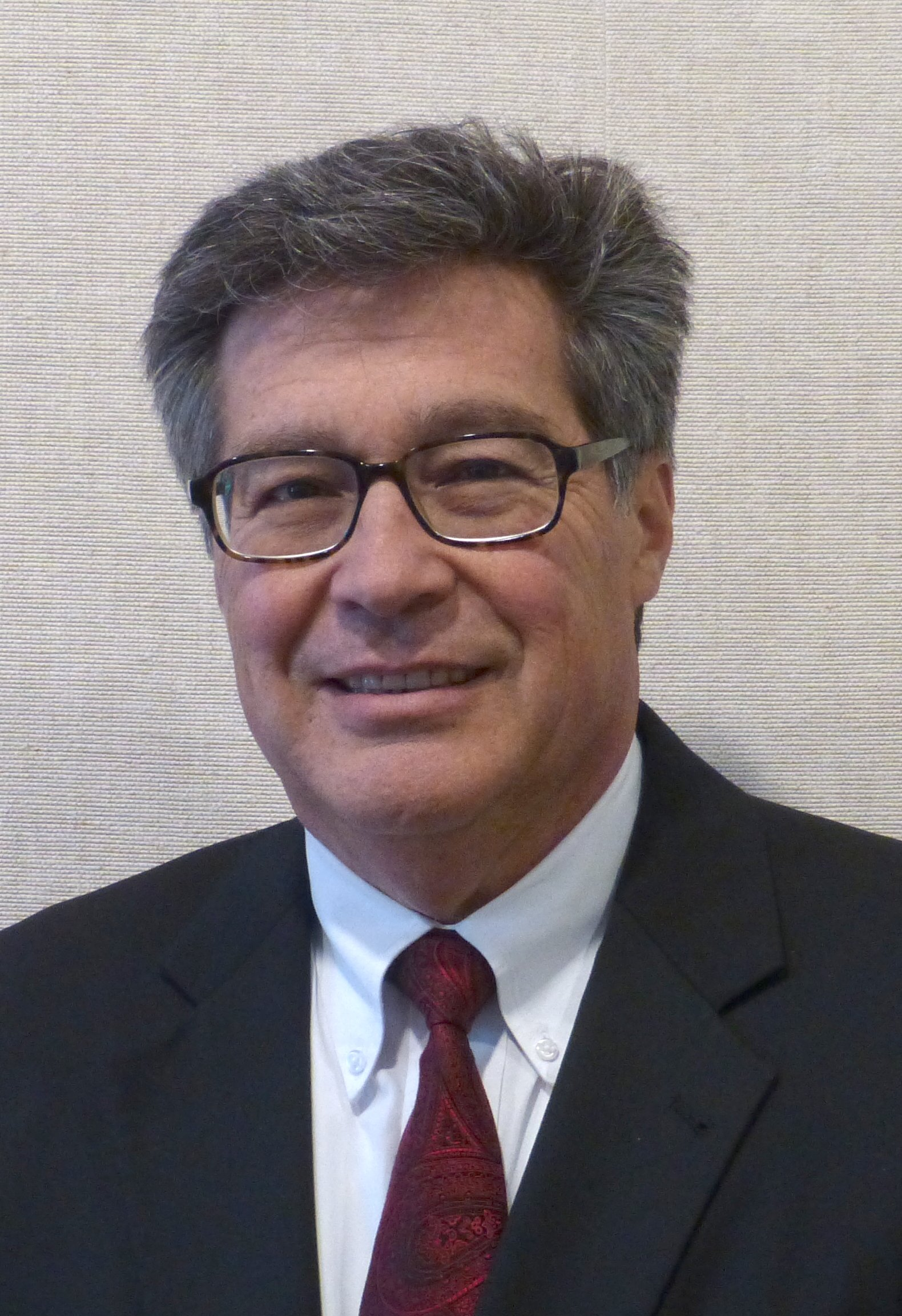
Mr. Weeden A. Wetmore, Esq.

Honorable Weeden A. Wetmore is the District Attorney of Chemung County in New York State.

He was born in Saugus, Massachusetts in 1953. Mr. Wetmore graduated from Piscataway High School in Piscataway, New Jersey in 1971. He received a Bachelor of Arts in English in 1975 from the University of Massachusetts at Amherst and his Juris Doctor in 1978 from Albany Law School.

Mr. Wetmore started his legal career as an Assistant District Attorney for Chemung County in 1978, working first for the Hon. D. Bruce Crew, III ("Pete") through 1982 and then for the Hon. James T. Hayden until 1986 as Chief Assistant

In 1986, Mr. Wetmore entered private practice with the Davidson & O’Mara, P.C. law firm and became a partner within a few years. In private practice, Mr. Wetmore was a litigator appearing in Supreme Courts throughout the Southern Tier, as well as federal courts for both the Western and Northern Districts of New York. Mr. Wetmore represented physicians and hospitals in medical malpractice cases; municipalities and school districts in tort, premises liability, and employee relation cases; contractors and subcontractors insured by the New York State Insurance Fund in construction accident cases, as well as various homeowners and automobile operators sued for personal injury and negligence.

Mr. Wetmore served on the Independent Judicial Qualifications Commission for the late Hon. Anthony V. Cardona, then presiding justice of the Appellate Division, Third Department. Mr. Wetmore also served as Sixth Judicial District representative for the New York State Bar Association Torts, Insurance, and Compensation Law Section, and as a representative traveled to Killarney, Ireland where he delivered a lecture on "Conflict of Laws" to members of the New York State and Ireland Bar Associations.

While in private practice, Mr. Wetmore was still a part-time Assistant District Attorney for James Hayden through December 1998 and then one year for the Thomas F. O’Mara through December 1999. From 2000 through 2004 Mr. Wetmore was counsel to New York State Assemblyman, George H. Winner, Jr. He was the Chemung County Attorney from 2004 through 2007.

In 2007, Mr. Wetmore successfully campaigned for the office of Chemung County District Attorney and began serving as District Attorney on January 1, 2008. As District Attorney, Mr. Wetmore serves as a voting member of the board of directors for the District Attorneys Association of the State of New York and is an active member of that Association's Best Practices Committee.

Mr. Wetmore has tried over 200 cases to verdict in civil and criminal courts, and has argued appeals before the Appellate Divisions of the Third and Fourth Departments, as well as before the Court of Appeals, New York's highest state court.

Mr. Wetmore has been a recipient of numerous awards. Most recently, Mr. Wetmore was the recipient of the New York Prosecutors Training Institute's (NYPTI) 2017 New York State "Prosecutor of the Year" award for trial advocacy." Also, in 2017 the Steuben and Chemung counties both separately issued proclamation's commending Mr. Wetmore's work on the cases of Thomas Clayton, Michael Beard, and Mark Blandford, all ultimately convicted in connection with Kelley Clayton's September 2015 death at her Caton, NY home.

Mr. Wetmore is married to Bridget Anne Sweet, and they have three children, Emily, Laura, and Joel.

Mr. Wetmore is a fan of all major Boston sports teams.
