= Eddie Murphy (disambiguation) =

Eddie Murphy (born 1961) is an American actor and comedian.

Eddie Murphy may also refer to:

- Eddie Murphy (footballer, born 1881) (1881–1916), English footballer
- Eddie Murphy (baseball) (1891–1969), American baseball player
- Eddie Murphy (speed skater) (1905–1973), American speed skater
- Eddie Murphy (footballer, born 1924), Scottish football player (played in the 1947–48 Scottish Cup)
- Eddie Murphy (footballer, born 1934) (1934–1983), Scottish football player (Clyde FC, Oldham Athletic)
- Eddie Murphy (hurler), hurling coach and former player from Co. Cork
- Eddie Murphy (album), his self-titled 1982 comedy album

== See also ==
- Audie Murphy (1925–1971), American soldier, actor, songwriter, and rancher
- Edward Murphy (disambiguation)
