= Patrick Murphy =

Patrick Murphy may refer to:

== Politicians ==
- Patrick Charles Murphy (1868–1925), Canadian Senator
- Patrick Murphy (Irish politician) (1889–1968), Irish Fianna Fáil politician from Cork
- Patrick Murphy (Pennsylvania politician) (born 1973), Under Secretary of the Army and Acting Secretary of the Army
- Patrick O. Murphy (born 1982), American politician in Massachusetts
- Patrick Murphy (Florida politician) (born 1983), former U.S. representative from Florida
- Patrick Francis Murphy (1860–1931), legislator in Massachusetts
- Patrick W. Murphy (1837–1901) Canadian-born American politician, and rancher

== Sportsmen ==
- Pat Murphy (rugby union) (c. 1878 – c. 1945), Australian rugby player
- P. A. Murphy (1919–1973), Irish Gaelic football player
- Patrick Murphy (cyclist) (born 1933), Canadian Olympic cyclist
- Patrick Murphy (judoka) (born 1944), Irish Olympic judoka
- Patrick Murphy (softball) (born 1965), American softball coach
- Patrick Murphy (swimmer) (born 1984), Australian Olympic swimmer
- Patrick Murphy (baseball) (born 1995), American baseball player
- Patrick "Weeshie" Murphy (died 1973), Gaelic footballer
- Patrick Murphy (cricketer) (1882–1938), Irish cricketer
- Patrick Murphy (American football) (born 1972), American football coach

== Others ==
- Patrick Murphy (bishop) (1920–2007), Australian Roman Catholic bishop, first bishop of Broken Bay
- Patrick Murphy (giant) (1834–1862), Irish giant
- Patrick Murphy (Medal of Honor) (1823–1896), American Civil War sailor and Medal of Honor recipient
- G. Patrick Murphy (born 1948), U.S. federal judge
- W. Patrick Murphy, U.S. diplomat
- Patrick Henry Murphy (born 1961), member of the Texas Seven, prison escapee 2000–2001
- Patrick V. Murphy (1920–2011), New York City Police Commissioner
- Patrick Murphy (pilot), Irish pilot who bombed Naco, Arizona in 1929
- Patrick Murphy (producer) (active since 1981), American television producer
- Patrick Murphy (artist) (born 1969), British artist and designer
- Patrick Murphy (surgeon) (1843–1922), British Irish army surgeon
- Patrick Murphy (The Young and the Restless), character on the American soap opera The Young and the Restless

== See also ==
- Pat Murphy (disambiguation)
- Paddy Murphy (disambiguation)
