= Patricia Murphy =

Patricia Murphy may refer to:

- Patricia Murphy (restaurateur) (1905–1979), American restaurateur
- Patricia Murphy (referee) (born 1981), Irish snooker and pool referee
- Patricia Colleen Murphy (21st century), American poet and teacher
- Patricia M. Murphy (1929–2025), American Roman Catholic sister and immigration activist
- Patricia Murphy Robinson, also known as Pat Robinson (active in the 1960s and 1970s), American leftist black feminist

== See also ==
- Pat Murphy (disambiguation)
