= Confrérie de la Chaîne des Rôtisseurs =

International gastronomic society

Logo of La Confrérie de la Chaîne des Rôtisseurs

La Confrérie de la Chaîne des Rôtisseurs (French pronunciation: [la kɔ̃fʁeʁi d(ə) la ʃɛːn de ʁotisœʁ]) is an international gastronomic society founded in Paris in 1950. It is one of the oldest gastronomic societies in the world.

The organization is named after the French Royal Guild of Goose Roasters, whose authority gradually expanded to the roasting of all poultry, meat, and game, and which disbanded in the late 1700s.

== History ==
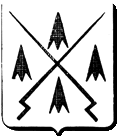
The historic coat of arms of the Rôtisseurs, upon which the current Chaîne seal is based

The organization takes its name from a historic organization of French culinary guilds.

The written history of the guild of "Les Oyers" or "Goose Roasters" has been traced back to 1248. At that time, King Louis IX assigned Étienne Boileau, the Provost of Paris, with the task of bringing order into the organization of trades and guilds, developing young apprentices and improving the technical knowledge of guild members. He gathered the charters of more than 100 of these trades, among them the Goose Roasters.

Over the years, the activities and privileges of the Goose Roasters Guild were extended to preparing and selling all kinds of meat, including poultry and venison.

In 1509, during the reign of King Louis XII, some new statutes were introduced, which resulted in the change of the name of the guild to "Rôtisseurs" and the restriction of its activities to poultry, game birds, lamb and venison. In 1610, under King Louis XIII, the guild was granted a royal charter and its own coat of arms.

For over four centuries, the "Confrérie", or brotherhood of the Roasters, cultivated and developed culinary art and high standards of professionalism and quality—standards befitting the splendor of the "Royal Table"—until the guild system collapsed in the 18th century during the French Revolution.

== The Chaîne today ==
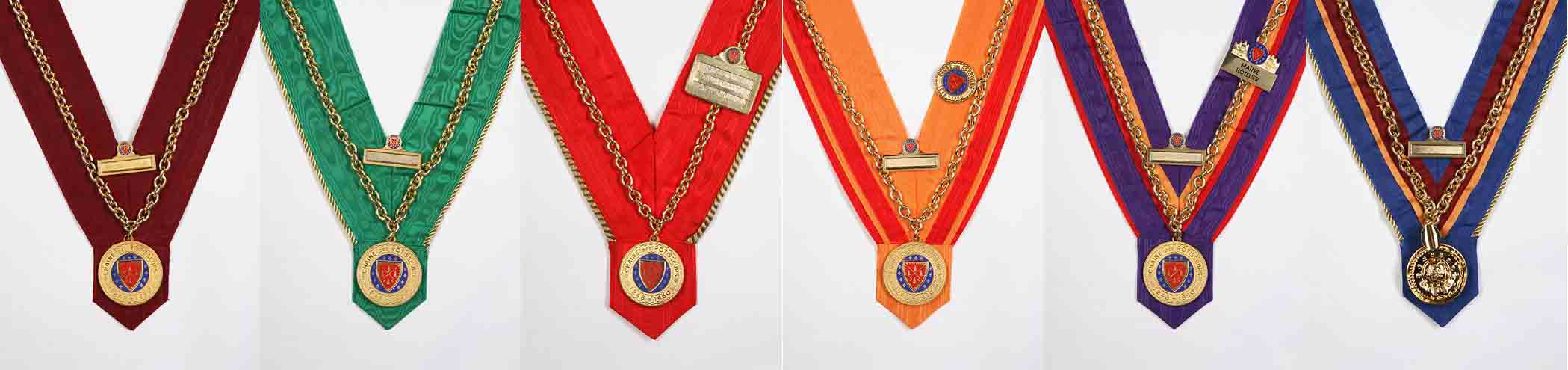
Membership ribbons designating levels

The name was revived in Paris in 1950 by a group of friends interested in food and wine. Since forming, the society has established bailliages, or chapters, internationally. As of 2022 the organization had bailliages in 80 countries.

Local bailliages host dinners for members. Membership is by invitation. In the United States, first year membership dues in 2016 ranged to $625, including a $275 induction fee. The original organization and most current chapters do not require members to be culinary professionals. Members receive ribbons designating their type and level of membership at the induction ceremony and may earn pins, medallions, and other indications of their service and participation in bailliage events.

== Competitions and awards ==
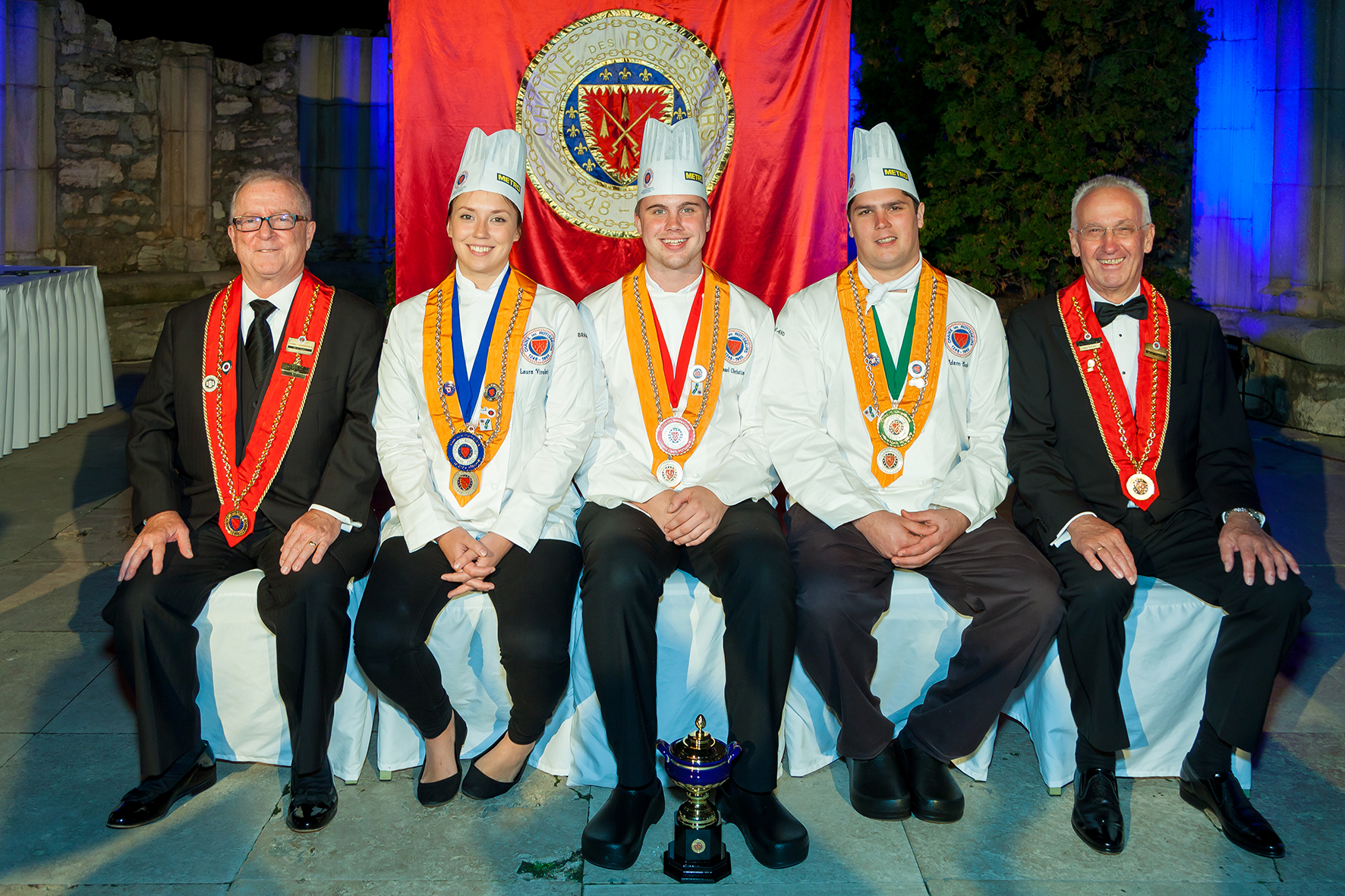
Local Bailliage winners

La Chaîne des Rôtisseurs organizes a cooking competition for young chefs under 27, the Jeunes Chefs Rôtisseurs, sponsored by a professional Chaîne member.

The competition is a "black box" competition, where the competitors do not know ahead of time the ingredients they will use. Competitors have 30 minutes to write a menu and three and a half hours to prepare a three-course dinner for four people.

The organization also organizes competitions for young sommeliers, the Jeunes Sommeliers.

In the USA only, chapters also present Brillat awards, named for gastronome Jean Anthelme Brillat-Savarin, to local chefs.

== Notable members ==
- Julia Child
- Pope Francis
- Barron Hilton
- Alfred Hitchcock
- Peter Mondavi
- Robert Mondavi
- Ronald Reagan
- Gerry Murphy
- Jarlath Burns
