= Séamus Murphy =

Séamus Murphy may refer to:

- Séamus Murphy (sculptor) (1907–1975), Irish sculptor
- Séamus Murphy (Gaelic footballer) (born 1938), Kerry player
- Séamus Murphy (Wexford hurler) (born 1950s), player and coach
- Séamus Murphy (Carlow hurler) (born 1986)
- Seamus Murphy (filmmaker) (born 1959), Irish documentary photographer and filmmaker

== See also ==
- James Murphy (disambiguation), anglicised spelling
- Seamus McMurphy (c. 1720–1750), Irish poet and outlaw
