= Edward Murray =

Edward, Ed or Eddie Murray may refer to:

- Ed Murray (baseball) (1895–1970), Major League Baseball player
- Ed Murray (Louisiana politician), member of the Louisiana House of Representatives
- Ed Murray (Tennessee politician) (1928–2009), speaker of the Tennessee House of Representatives
- Ed Murray (Washington politician) (born 1955), former mayor of Seattle, Washington
- Ed Murray (Wyoming politician) (born 1958), Secretary of State of Wyoming
- Eddie Murray (born 1956), American Major League Baseball player
- Eddie Murray (American football) (born 1956), National Football League player
- Eddie Murray (rugby league) (1959–1981), Aboriginal Australian rugby league footballer
- Eddie Murray (footballer) (born 1962), English footballer
- Edward Murray (colonial administrator) (c.1800–1874), Trinidadian registrar of slaves
- Edward P. Murray (1876–1966), American judge
- Sir Edward Murray (judge) (born 1958), British High Court judge

== See also ==
- Edwin R. Murray (Ed Murray, born 1960), Democratic politician from Louisiana
- Edward Murphy (disambiguation)
