= Arthur Murphy =

Art or Arthur Murphy may refer to:

== Politicians ==
- Arthur H. Murphy (1831–1903), Canadian entrepreneur and Legislative Assembly of Quebec member
- Arthur P. Murphy (1870–1914), American Republican congressman from Missouri
- Arthur Murphy (Idaho politician) (1898–1977), American baseball player and Democratic state legislator
- Arthur G. Murphy Sr. (1930–1978), American Democratic member of Maryland House of Delegates

== Writers ==
- Arthur Murphy (writer) (1727–1805), Irish actor, barrister, journalist and playwright, pen name Charles Ranger
- Arthur Edward Murphy (1901–1962), American philosopher, academic and author
- Arthur W. Murphy (1922–2016), American law professor and writer on nuclear power

== Others ==
- Arthur William Murphy (1891–1963), Australian engineer and Royal Australian Air Force aviator
- Arthur Murphy (broadcaster) (1928–2019), Irish and British radio/television personality
- Art Murphy (1942–2006), American classical and jazz musician, pianist and composer
