= Kevin Murphy =

Kevin Murphy may refer to:

== Artists and actors ==
- Kevin Murphy (actor) (born 1956), American actor, author and puppeteer, best known for his work on Mystery Science Theater 3000
- Kevin Murphy (musician) (born 1947), American keyboardist
- Kevin Murphy (screenwriter), American screenwriter, television producer, and composer
- Kevin Andrew Murphy, American novelist and game writer
- Kevin Mark Murphy (born 1957), Canadian musician, criminal lawyer, co-founder of Singing Fools

== Politicians ==
- Kevin Murphy (ombudsman) (1937–2012), appointed Ombudsman by the President of Ireland, serving from 1994 to 2003
- Kevin J. Murphy (politician) (born 1952), Massachusetts House of Representatives
- Kevin P. Murphy (born 1965), Pennsylvania politician, representing the 113th PA House District
- Kevin Murphy (Canadian politician) (born 1970), Canadian politician, Speaker of the Nova Scotia House of Assembly

== Sports figures ==
- Kevin Murphy (linebacker) (born 1963), retired American football player
- Kevin Murphy (lineman) (born 1965), American football player
- Kevin Murphy (basketball) (born 1990), professional basketball player
- Kevin Murphy (cricketer) (born 1963), Zimbabwean cricketer
- Kevin Murphy (swimmer) (born 1949), "King of the Channel" title holder for crossing the English Channel

== Other ==
- Kevin J. Murphy (professor) (born 1957), Kenneth L. Trefftzs Chair in Finance, USC Marshall School of Business
- Kevin M. Murphy (born 1958), economist and professor at the University of Chicago
