= Kieran Murphy =

Kieran Murphy may refer to:

- Kieran Murphy (rugby union) (born 1988), Welsh rugby union player
- Kieran Murphy (Sarsfields hurler) (born 1983), Irish hurler for Sarsfields and Cork
- Kieran Murphy (Erin's Own hurler) (born 1983), Irish hurler for Erin's Own and Cork
- Kieran Murphy (footballer) (born 1987), Irish footballer
- Kieran Murphy (cyclist) (born 1992), Australian Paralympic tandem cyclist
- Kieran Murphy (Gaelic footballer) (born 1955), Irish Gaelic footballer

== See also ==
- Ciarán Murphy (born 1940), Irish former Fianna Fáil politician
