= Eoin Murphy =

Eoin Murphy may refer to:

- Eoin Murphy (Waterford hurler) (born 1978)
- Eoin Murphy (Kilkenny hurler) (born 1990)

== See also ==
- Eoghan Murphy (born 1982), Irish politician
- Eoghan Murphy (hurler) (born 1997), Irish hurler
- Owen Murphy (disambiguation)
