= Nicholas Murphy =

Nicholas or Nick Murphy may refer to:

- Nicholas Murphy (Gaelic footballer) (born 1978), Irish Gaelic football player
- Nicholas Daniel Murphy (1811–1890), Irish politician
- Nicholas Joseph Murphy (1880–1913), Irish nationalist politician
- Nicholas Murphy, founding pastor of Our Lady of Good Counsel's Church (Staten Island), New York
- Nick Murphy (American football) (born 1979), American football player
- Nick Murphy (footballer, born 1946) (born 1946), English footballer
- Nick Murphy (footballer, born 1966) (1966–1998), English footballer
- Nick Murphy (director), British film director and television director
- Nick Vincent Murphy (born 1977), Irish writer
- Chet Faker (born Nicholas James Murphy, 1988), Australian musician also known as Nick Murphy
