= James A. Murphy III =

American politician (born 1961)

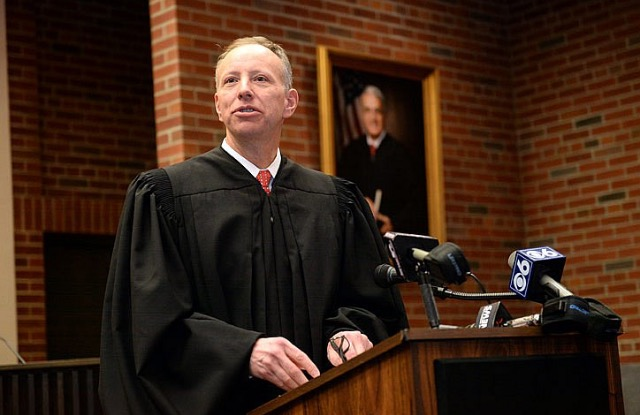
Acting Supreme Court Justice and Saratoga County Court Judge James A. Murphy III

James A. Murphy III (born c. 1961) is an American politician, a former district attorney, and a jurist. He was an acting justice of the Supreme Court of the State of New York and the county court judge for Saratoga County, New York from 2014 to 2025.

Murphy began serving in the Saratoga County District Attorney's Office in 1988, as an assistant DA. He first was elected district attorney in 1997 and was sworn in on January 2, 1998. He was re-elected in 2001, 2005, 2009 and 2013. In all, he served for nearly 30 years as a prosecutor. His grandfather was United States Congressman Carleton J. King.

== Early life and education ==
Murphy was born in Saratoga Springs, New York, on October 13, 1961, to Constance King Murphy, a law school graduate, and James A. Murphy, Jr. of Brooklyn, New York, an attorney and later mayor of Saratoga Springs. He is a grandson of Carleton J. King, who was Saratoga County District Attorney from 1950 to 1961, served as a member of the United States Congress from 1961 to 1974, and was later Chairman of the Board of Visitors of West Point Military Academy.

Murphy graduated from Saratoga Springs Schools in 1979. He earned his bachelor's degree from Bates College in Lewiston, Maine, in 1983. He received a Juris Doctor from Pace University School of Law in New York in 1986. He attended the Harvard Kennedy School for Executive Education and received a Certificate in Leadership in 2011. During his second year of law school he attended University College London Law Faculty, England, during which time he was employed by the House of Commons of the United Kingdom and worked for Jim Wallace, M.P., of Orkney and Shetland. He is a graduate of the FBI Citizen's Academy.

== Early career ==
Murphy was a law clerk at the firm of Kane, Dalsimer, Kane, Sullivan, Kurucz, Levy, Eisele and Richard, in New York City with Siegrun D. Kane while she authored Trademark law: a practitioner's guide. Upon being admitted to the New York State Bar, he became an associate of the firm.

Murphy first joined the Saratoga County District Attorney's Office in 1988 as an assistant district attorney. He was appointed First Assistant District Attorney in 1996. He ran for the position of district attorney in 1997 and was sworn in on January 2, 1998, becoming one of the youngest district attorney in New York State. He successfully ran for re-election in 2001, 2005, 2009 and 2013.

== Work as district attorney ==
As District Attorney, Murphy established misdemeanor and felony drug courts for offenders addicted to controlled substances or alcohol. During Murphy's tenure, the Saratoga County Drug Treatment Court diverted hundreds of participants into treatment and away from correctional facilities, helping individuals rejoin the work force and saving incarceration expenses. Murphy created specialized domestic violence, special victims, and violent felony prosecution units.

With the assistance of the Superintendent of the New York State Police, a position of NYSP Senior Investigator assigned to the District Attorney's Office was created. to coordinate state police investigations with the office.

He appeared on The Today Show for the prosecution of a manslaughter case and on Dateline NBC in a two-hour special entitled "The Man Behind the Mask" for the prosecution of a kidnapper who attempted to abduct a high school track star. He has also appeared on Cold Case Files. Murphy prosecuted a defendant who was sentenced in 1995 to back-to-back life sentences, the longest sentence in the county, for the murder of his wife and mother-in-law.

On September 20, 2014, Murphy resigned as Saratoga County District Attorney while running for Saratoga County Court Judge.

== Work as judge ==
Initially assigned to Schenectady, New York, as the acting county court judge, Murphy was assigned to an active trial part. He was then assigned to Saratoga County where he has chambers. He presided as acting judge throughout the 3rd and 4th Judicial Districts and, as Acting Supreme and County Court, heard both civil and criminal matters within the Unified Court System in New York State. He retired in 2025, with James Davis, a former New York State deputy inspector general, replacing him as Saratoga County's county court judge.

== Professional affiliations ==
Murphy is past President and Chairman of the Board of the District Attorneys Association of the State of New York and testified before the New York State Senate, the New York State Assembly and the Sentencing Commission regarding reform of the Rockefeller Drug Laws. Murphy is a member of the NYS Supreme Court's 4th Judicial District Law Library Board and was New York State co-chair of Fight Crime-Invest in Kids Inc. Murphy served on the Criminal Justice Section of the New York State Bar Association and was a member of the House of Delegates.

In 2003, Governor George Pataki appointed him to the NYS Commission on Forensic Science. Governor Pataki and Governor Eliot Spitzer appointed him to serve on the New York State Domestic Violence Advisory Board in 2001 and 2007, respectively. Murphy was re-appointed by Governor Andrew Cuomo in 2013 to both positions.

== Personal ==
He is an Episcopalian. He is married to Laurie Jorgensen Murphy of Harvard, Massachusetts, an alumna of Duke University later employed by General Electric.

== See also ==
- District Attorneys Association of the State of New York
