= Martin Murphy =

Martin Murphy may refer to:

- Martin Murphy (civil engineer) (1832–1926), Irish-born Canadian civil engineer
- Martin Murphy (rugby league), English rugby league footballer of the 1960s, 1970s and 1980s
- Martin Murphy (politician) (1862–1919), Irish nationalist MP for East Waterford 1913–18
- Martin Murphy of Mental As Anything
- Martin Murphy Jr. (1807–1884), American settler, founder of Sunnyvale, California
- Martin Murphy Sr. (1785–1865) American settler, founder of San Martin, California
- Martin Luther Murphy (1875–1969), Baptist minister in Australia and England
