= Singing Fools =

Canadian music group

Background information
- Origin: Ottawa, Ontario, Canada
- Genres: Hip hop, protest
- Years active: 1982–1990
- Past members: Tim Dunlop; Kevin Murphy

Singing Fools was a short-lived Canadian non-performing musical group based in Ottawa, Ontario, Canada, composed of musicians Tim Dunlop and Kevin Murphy. The pair wrote and recorded hip hop-style songs with politically focused lyrics.

== History ==
The Singing Fools came together in November 1982. The released a self-produced 1982 vinyl single, The Bum Rap, which received wide airplay on campus radio and was a criticism of the Canadian government's wage and price control program. Its sparse guitar and drum box arrangement was overlain by excerpts of Prime Minister Pierre Trudeau's infamous exhortation during the 1970 October Crisis to "just watch me". The song was later touted as Canada's first rap record, even though it was actually preceded by several 1979 singles by the lesser-known rapper Mr. Q.

By 1985 the pair had released their third "civil defencercise" themed record The Apocalypso and its accompanying video which was given regular rotation on MuchMusic. The nuclear war-themed clip featured a cameo dance appearance by Ottawa Mayor Marion Dewar. The extended-play vinyl disc also featured a track entitled "Grave Expectations," a drum-backed recitation by English historian and anti-nuclear activist, E.P. Thompson, of his apocalyptic 1950 verse on atomic war, "The Place Called Choice".

That year the Singing Fools were signed by A&M Records; A&M re-released The Apocalypso, but dropped the group after a few months and the band released its self-produced mini-LP, Call Me Lucky in 1986. The same year, Singing Fools were nominated (by themselves) as "best independent artist" in the CASBY Awards sponsored by Toronto's CFNY-FM.

A 1987 distribution deal with German indie label, Amok Records led to the Cold War-themed single, Funkenstrasse (Europa's on the Radio). After Murphy and Dunlop parted company in the 1990s Singing Fools was transformed into an internet-based music and video production company.
