= Jon Costas =

H. Jonathan Costas

Mayor of Valparaiso, Indiana
- Incumbent
- Assumed office January 1, 2024
- Preceded by: Matt Murphy
- In office January 1, 2004 – January 1, 2020
- Preceded by: David A. Butterfield
- Succeeded by: Matt Murphy

Personal details
- Born: May 14, 1957 (age 69) Gary, Indiana, U.S.
- Party: Republican
- Spouse: Sharon Costas
- Education: St. Joseph's College (BA); Valparaiso University (JD)
- Website: City website

H. Jonathon Costas (born May 14, 1957) is an American singer, musician and politician serving as mayor of Valparaiso, Indiana. He is a member of the Indiana Commission for Higher Education, an elder law attorney, and a small business owner. He was first elected mayor in 2003 and served until 2020, before being re-elected in 2023.

Costas is lead singer for the band The ConservaDellics and is an Ironman Triathlete.

== Early life and education ==
Costas is the son of the late former state senator William P. Costas, known locally for an eponymous supermarket chain. The family moved from Gary, Indiana, to Valparaiso in 1972 and Costas graduated from Valparaiso High School in 1975. He graduated with a B.A. from St. Joseph's College in Rensselaer, Indiana, and a J.D. from Valparaiso University, where he later became adjunct faculty.

== Political career ==
Costas was introduced to politics through his father's campaigns, including the father's unsuccessful campaigns for the United States Congress in 1986 and 1990. His first major public role was in 1993 as co-chair of a group opposed to a referendum to allow a Circus Circus casino in Porter County. Even though two neighboring counties approved the casino ballot measure and Costas's group was out-spent by more than 10-to-1, the referendum was rejected by Porter County voters.

=== City council ===
In 1995, having established a successful law practice, Costas sought and won an at-large seat on Valparaiso City Council. While on Council, Costas supported a measure banning the sale of certain forms of pornography in Valparaiso. Costas also cast a vote against allowing city employees to organize into a public employee labor union, though he received labor union endorsements in subsequent elections. In 1997, as chairman of the Parks Foundation, Costas led an effort to raise $250,000 to buy land for a park on Silver Lake.

=== Mayor ===
Costas first ran for mayor against David A. Butterfield in 1999 and was defeated by 196 votes despite having the endorsement of both major local newspapers. Some analysts claim that Costas's running a positive campaign and not 'going negative' contributed to the loss. Columnist Pat Bankston wrote:

Costas' decision to be positive rather than negative has been viewed by some in both political parties as a weakness, a lack of the killer instinct. Some have said that Costas is too nice to be a politician. Some have charged that it was a political mistake not to go after the mayor (Butterfield) on the Pratt deal when Costas had the chance. Maybe. We'll never know if Costas might have won if he had been a more typical political campaigner.

Costas again ran for mayor in 2003 and won with approximately 56% of the vote, ending Butterfield's 20-year tenure. Every Republican on the city ballot won election, the first Republican sweep in at least 33 years. Costas carried the endorsements of the city's firefighters and police, Building Trades Council, AFL-CIO, and Operating Engineers, who historically support Democratic candidates. His campaign theme was similar to that of 1999, including calls for long term planning, controlled growth, redevelopment of "blighted areas", and more aggressive economic development to create jobs. These ideas were contained in a "Costas Plan", which was released in October 2003 and became the basis for his 2004 strategic plan.

Costas's term as mayor began with a significant reorganization of city government, including appointing a new City Planner, appointing new Police and Fire chiefs, and creating the post of City Administrator. Costas appointed the first African-American to a city board and oversaw the hiring of the first African-American police officer.

His first tenure as mayor ended January 1, 2020. In May 2022, Costas was appointed to a four-year term on the Valparaiso School Board, which he stepped down from when re-elected as mayor in 2023.

==== Costas Plan ====
The Costas Plan, produced during the election, became the basis for Costas's goals in his first term, which included improving city planning, increasing government efficiency, building "strong" neighborhoods, and creating "quality" jobs. After a year-long planning process that included numerous public consultations, the city produced a Strategic Plan in 2005.

Costas soon began a construction program. Through 2009, the city had spent $40M on roads, sewers, redevelopment of blighted areas, the water treatment plant, and other infrastructure, with over $30M having come from state and federal grants rather than local taxpayers. The city built a new police station, started a road repair program, and obtained several grants for long-delayed sewer work. The "triangle" intersection was reworked into a roundabout, the first in the area. The city condemned a derelict shopping center and engaged a philanthropic local family to redevelop it, donating half the cost of building a new YMCA on the site.

Costas authored the city's first ethics ordinance when he was on city council. He appointed a Neighborhood Advocate, started a "Fit City" program, launched a city bus service called the V-Line and the Chicago Dash, reached agreement from restaurant and bar owners on a smoking ban, saved $200K by consolidating the city's 911 dispatch with the County's, and created several environmental initiatives such as reducing the city's energy use and increasing recycling to 70% of the city's solid waste (from 49%).

The editorial boards of local newspapers soon began taking note of Costas's new style, with the Times claiming that other cities should "follow Valparaiso's lead" in both content and process.

In his 2007 and 2008 State of the City addresses, Costas credited the Plan for helping the city to obtain $20M of grants to pay for Eastgate improvements, Valparaiso Street reconstruction, improvements related to the County Seat redevelopment, and sewer projects. Costas also claims to have repaved nearly 1/3 of the city's roads, as compared to a few miles a year before Costas' tenure. He claims the city has saved $700K in insurance premiums, attracted $28M of private investment, and spearheaded the redevelopment of the former County Seat Plaza.

In October 2023, he released The Costas Plan 2.0: Greater Things!, which includes public safety efficiency, repairing sidewalks in older neighborhoods, improving walkability in the downtown, ensuring sustainable population growth, and revamping the Valpo Sports and Recreation Campus park project.

== Re-elections ==
In 2007, Costas defeated 4th District Republican City Councilman Robert McCasland with 65% of the vote in the Republican primary. No Democrat challenged Costas, and he was re-elected on November 6, 2007. Costas was endorsed by both major newspapers, with the Times noting that Costas "whipped the city's finances into better shape" and "created a spirit of cooperative enthusiasm in the city".

On June 2, 2008, Costas was defeated by Greg Zoeller for the Republican nomination for Indiana Attorney General at the Indiana Republican State Convention. Costas subsequently campaign-managed Zoeller's successful run against Democrat Linda Pence.

Costas was unopposed in the May 2011 primary election for mayor. He won 68% of the vote in the general election against Bob McCasland, who ran as an Independent. Costas defeated McCasland in the 2007 Republican primary.

Costas ran unopposed in 2015 and served as mayor before retiring in 2020.

On December 8, 2022, Costas announced he would be running for mayor for the upcoming year in 2023, after current mayor, Matt Murphy, stepped down.

In November 2023, it was reported that Costas beat Democratic challenger Hannah Trueblood with 58.42% of the vote, and he became mayor yet again.
