= Matthew Murphy (disambiguation) =

Matthew Murphy (born 1984) is an English musician.

Matthew Murphy may also refer to:

== Music and theater ==
- Matt "Guitar" Murphy (1929–2018), American blues guitarist
- Matt Murphy (Canadian musician), Canadian musician and actor
- Matty Murphy, English bass guitarist and member of the Lathums
- Matt Murphy, writer and producer of the off-Broadway show Sex Tips for Straight Women from a Gay Man

== Politics ==
- Matthew Murphy (diplomat) (1890–1967), Irish ambassador to Argentina
- Matt Murphy (Illinois politician) (born 1970), Illinois state senator
- Matt Murphy (Indiana politician), mayor of Valparaiso, Indiana
- Matthew Murphy (New York politician), member of the New York State Assembly

== Sports ==
- Matt Murphy (English footballer) (born 1971), English association football player
- Matt Murphy (tight end) (born 1980), American football tight end
- Matt Murphy (guard) (born 1989), American football guard
- Matt Murphy (wrestler) (born 1979), American professional wrestler
- Mattie Murphy, Irish hurling player
