= Jim Murphy (disambiguation) =

Jim Murphy (born 1967) is a British Labour Party politician.

Jim Murphy may also refer to:

- Jim Murphy (American football) (born 1975), American football player and coach
- Jim Murphy (author) (1947–2022), American author
- Jim Murphy (boxer) (1903–1987), Irish boxer
- Jim Murphy (footballer, born 1942), Scottish professional footballer
- Jim Murphy (footballer, born 1956), Scottish professional footballer
- Jim Murphy (hurler), Irish hurler
- Jim Murphy (Missouri politician) (born c. 1951), member of the Missouri House of Representatives
- Jim Murphy (skateboarder) (born 1965), American skateboarder and activist
- Jim Murphy (Texas politician) (born 1957), member of the Texas House of Representatives
- Jim Murphy (rugby league), Australian rugby league player
- Jim Murphy (runner) (born 1944), co-winner of the 1964 3 miles at the NCAA Division I Outdoor Track and Field Championships

== See also ==
- Murphy (surname)
- Murphy (disambiguation)
- James Murphy (disambiguation)
