= Afterburner Inc =

American business consulting firm

Afterburner Inc.
- Type: Private
- Industry: Consulting & Training
- Founded: Atlanta, Georgia, U.S., 1996
- Headquarters: 255 Giralda Ave, Floor 5, Coral Gables, Florida 33134, USA
- Key people: James D. 'Murph' Murphy, Founder & Active Partner; Christian 'Boo' Boucousis, CEO & Former Royal Australian Air Force fighter pilot
- Products: Leadership Keynotes, Team Building Simulations (incl. The Top Gun Experience, LEGO Challenge), Strategic Planning Workshops, Red Team Workshops, Debriefing Workshops, Flawless Leadership Program, Full 90-Day Accelerator Program, Flawless Execution Coaching, 1:1 Coaching
- Website: Official website

Afterburner Inc. is a Coral Gables, Florida-based leadership development and business consulting firm founded in 1996 by U.S. Air Force fighter pilot James D. "Murph" Murphy in Atlanta, Georgia. The company is currently led by CEO Christian "Boo" Boucousis, a former Royal Australian Air Force fighter pilot, one of only 400 trained over 40 years, builder and exiter of multiple multimillion-dollar companies, and author of The Afterburner Advantage (2025). Murphy remains the founder and an active partner, and is the author of multiple Afterburner publications, including Flawless Execution (HarperCollins, 2005) and Business Is Combat (Regan Books, 2000). Together, Murphy and Boucousis co-authored On Time On Target. Afterburner has trained more than two million leaders across more than 3,500 events worldwide and works with over 85% of Fortune 50 companies, including Google, Microsoft, Pfizer, and the NBA. The firm helps organizations close the execution gap using its proprietary Flawless Leadership^{SM} system, a complete leadership operating system built around three dimensions: Mindset, Method, and Moments, operationalized through the Flawless Execution^{SM} Cycle (Plan-Brief-Execute-Debrief^{SM}). Afterburner has been featured in The Wall Street Journal, Forbes, The New York Times, the Financial Times, and Businessweek, and has appeared on CNN, CNBC, Fox News, ABC, HLN, and Bloomberg News. The firm has ranked on the Inc. 500/5000 List of America's Fastest Growing Companies five times.

== Products ==
While Afterburner is known for keynote engagements and experiential events featuring military personnel, Afterburner aids and advises Global 2000 businesses specifically in the area of execution of strategic "can’t fail" missions.

== Clients ==
Afterburner has trained 2M+ leaders across 3,500+ events delivered worldwide, and continues to work with over 85% of Fortune 50 companies. Notable client outcomes include VMware achieving 12 consecutive quarters of 20% year-over-year growth and DSI surpassing its revenue goal by 22% following adoption of the Flawless Leadership^{SM} system.

== Publications ==
- Flawless Execution, James D. Murphy, Harper Collins, 2005 ISBN 978-0060834166
- Down Range, James D. Murphy & William M. Duke, John Wiley & Sons 2014 ISBN 978-1118790151
- Courage to Execute, James D. Murphy, John Wiley & Sons 2014 ISBN 978-1118790090
- The Debrief Imperative, James D. Murphy & William M. Duke ISBN 9781607460404
- Business is Combat, James D. Murphy, Regan Books, 2000 ISBN 0060988290
- On Time On Target, James D. Murphy & Christian 'Boo' Boucousis ISBN 978-1760293840
- The Afterburner Advantage, Christian 'Boo' Boucousis (2025) ISBN 978-1600052903
