= Daniel Murphy =

Daniel Murphy may refer to:

== Sportsmen ==
=== Association football (soccer) ===
- Danny Murphy (footballer, born 1922) (1922–2001), English football player born in Burtonwood, Cheshire
- Danny Murphy (footballer, born 1977), English international football player born in Chester
- Danny Murphy (footballer, born 1982), Irish international football player born in Bermondsey, London, United Kingdom

=== Baseball ===
- Danny Murphy (catcher) (1864–1915), American baseball catcher
- Danny Murphy (second baseman) (1876–1955), American baseball second baseman
- Danny Murphy (pitcher) (born 1942), American baseball pitcher
- Dan Murphy (baseball) (born 1964), American baseball pitcher
- Daniel Murphy (baseball) (born 1985), American baseball second baseman

=== Other sports ===
- Danny Murphy (Australian footballer, born 1884) (1884–1956), Australian footballer for Fitzroy
- Danny Murphy (Australian footballer, born 1960), Australian footballer for North Melbourne
- Dan Murphy (sportscaster) (born 1970), Canadian hockey reporter
- Dan Murphy (ice hockey) (born 1976), Canadian ice hockey goaltender
- Danny Murphy (hurler) (born 1977), Irish sportsman
- Dan Murphy (rugby union) (born 1985), English rugby union player

== Arts ==
- Danny Murphy (American actor) (1955–2014)
- Dan Murphy (musician) (born 1962), American guitarist for Soul Asylum
- Danny Murphy (British actor) (born 2004)

== Other people ==
- Daniel Murphy (bishop) (1815–1907), Australian Roman Catholic Archbishop of Hobart
- Daniel Martin Murphy (1826–1882), Canadian-born American settler and rancher in California
- Daniel D. Murphy (1866-1944), American farmer, businessman, and politician
- Daniel J. Murphy (1922–2001), American navy admiral
- Daniel Murphy (computer scientist) (born 1929), American computer scientist
- Daniel Thomas Turley Murphy (born 1943), American-born bishop in the Roman Catholic Church
- Dan Murphy (trade unionist) (born 1946), Irish former trade union leader
- Daniel J. Murphy (botanist), Australian botanist
- Daniel Murphy (computer scientist), American computer scientist
- Dan Murphy (physician) (1944–2020), American physician who practiced in East Timor
- Daniel P. Murphy, Canadian businessman who operated Tim Hortons and Wendy's franchises

== Fictional characters ==
- Daniel "Spud" Murphy, a character in Trainspotting

== See also ==
- Dan Murphy's, Australian liquor store chain
- Daniel Murphy High School, Los Angeles, California, U.S.
