= Judge Murphy =

Judge Murphy may refer to:

- Bernard Murphy (judge) (fl. 1970s–2010s), judge of the Federal Court of Australia
- Diana E. Murphy (1934–2018), judge of the United States Court of Appeals for the Eighth Circuit
- Edward Preston Murphy (1904–1958), judge of the United States District Court for the Northern District of California
- Eric E. Murphy (born 1979), judge of the United States Court of Appeals for the Sixth Circuit
- G. Patrick Murphy (born 1948), judge of the United States District Court for the Southern District of Illinois
- Harold Loyd Murphy (1927–2022), judge of the United States District Court for the Northern District of Georgia
- John Frank Murphy (born 1977), judge of the United States District Court for the Eastern District of Pennsylvania
- John W. Murphy (Pennsylvania politician) (1902–1962), judge of the United States District Court for the Middle District of Pennsylvania
- Michael R. Murphy (born 1947), judge of the United States Court of Appeals for the Tenth Circuit
- Stephen Murphy III (born 1962), judge of the United States District Court for the Eastern District of Michigan
- Thomas Francis Murphy (1905–1995), judge of the United States District Court for the Southern District of New York
- Thomas W. Murphy (Illinois judge) (fl. 1990s–2000s), judge of the Cook County Circuit Court

== See also ==
- Justice Murphy (disambiguation)
