= William P. Costas =

American politician

Member of the Indiana Senate from the 5th district
- In office November 5, 1980 – November 9, 1988
- Preceded by: John Reginald Larson
- Succeeded by: William E. Alexa

William P. Costas (June 18, 1927 – July 23, 2013) was an American businessman and politician.

Born in Detroit, Michigan, he started his business career as a food buyer in Gary, Indiana. He then owned and operated Costas Foods in Valparaiso, Indiana 1972–1998. He served in the Indiana State Senate 1980–1988. His son Jon Costas was mayor of Valparaiso, Indiana from 2004 to 2020. Costas died in Valparaiso, Indiana.
