= Pat Murphy =

Pat Murphy may refer to:

- Pat Murphy (writer) (born 1955), American science and science-fiction writer
- Pat Murphy (sports journalist), British sports writer and radio broadcaster
- Pat Murphy (catcher) (1857–1927), American baseball player
- Pat Murphy (Australian footballer, born 1906) (1906–1973), Australian rules footballer with Hawthorn
- Pat Murphy (1929–2025), American Roman Catholic sister and immigration activist
- Pat Murphy (Australian footballer, born 1947), Australian rules footballer with St Kilda
- Pat Murphy (Welsh footballer) (born 1947)
- Pat Murphy (baseball manager) (born 1958), American baseball coach
- Pat Murphy (Iowa politician) (born 1959), American politician
- Pat Murphy (Canadian politician) (1962–2025), member of the Legislative Assembly of Prince Edward Island, from 2007 to 2019
- Pat Murphy (director) (born 1951), Irish film director
- Pat Murphy (rugby union) (c. 1878–c. 1945), Australian rugby union player
- Pat Murphy (rugby league) (1896–?), Australian rugby player

== See also ==
- Patrick Murphy (disambiguation)
- Patricia Murphy (disambiguation)
