= Richard Murphy =

Richard Murphy may refer to:

== Arts and entertainment ==
- Richard Murphy (screenwriter) (1912–1993), American film and television writer
- Richard Murphy (poet) (1927–2018), Irish poet
- Richard Murphy (architect) (born 1955), Scottish architect

== Politics and law ==
- Richard L. Murphy (1875–1936), American Senator from Iowa
- Richard W. Murphy (1929–2024), American diplomat
- Dick Murphy (Richard M. Murphy, born 1942), American politician, mayor of San Diego
- Rick Murphy, American politician, Arizona state senator

== Sports ==
- Dick Murphy (basketball) (1921–1973), American basketball player
- Bos Murphy (Richard Murphy, 1924–2000), New Zealand boxer
- Dick Murphy (baseball) (1931–2020), American baseball player
- Richard Murphy (rower) (1931–2023), American Olympic rower
- Richard Murphy (American football) (born 1986), American football running back

== Others ==
- Richard Murphy (sea captain) (1838–1916), American sea captain in Gloucester, Massachusetts
- Richard Murphy (marine ecologist) (born 1942), American marine ecologist
- Richard A. Murphy (1944–2022), American neuroscientist
- Richard Murphy (tax campaigner) (born 1958), British campaigner and accountant
- Richard Murphy (businessman) (born 1961), known for founding video rental chains
- Richard Murphy (police officer) (fl. 1999), American police officer, involved in shooting of Amadou Diallo
