= Ted Murphy (Australian footballer) =

Australian rules footballer

Personal information
- Full name: Ted Murphy
- Born: 3 August 1947 (age 79)
- Height: 188 cm (6 ft 2 in)
- Weight: 89 kg (196 lb)

Playing career^{1}
Years	Club	Games (Goals)
1968–69	Richmond	17 (1)
- ^{1} Playing statistics correct to the end of 1969.

Ted Murphy (born 3 August 1947) is a former Australian rules footballer who played with Richmond in the Victorian Football League (VFL).
