= Nick Murphy (footballer, born 1946) =

English footballer

Personal information
- Full name: Nicholas Michael Murphy
- Date of birth: 25 December 1946 (age 79)
- Place of birth: West Bromwich, England
- Positions: Midfielder; winger

Senior career*
Years	Team	Apps	(Gls)
1966–1970	Manchester United	0	(0)
1970–1971	Reading	4	(0)
1971–1972	Altrincham	?	(?)
	Bangor City	?	(?)
- * Club domestic league appearances and goals

Nicholas Michael Murphy (born 25 December 1946) is an English former professional footballer who played in the Football League as a midfielder. He is the son of Manchester United former coach and temporary manager Jimmy Murphy.
