= Gerard Murphy =

Gerard Murphy may refer to:

- Gerard Murphy (actor) (1948–2013), Irish film, television and theatre actor
- Gerard Murphy (Australian sports consultant)
- Gerard Murphy (mathematician) (1948–2006), Irish mathematics professor
- Gerard Murphy (politician) (1951–2024), Irish Fine Gael politician, TD for Cork North-West

== See also ==
- Gerry Murphy (disambiguation)
