= Martin Murphy (civil engineer) =

Canadian civil engineer (1832-1926)

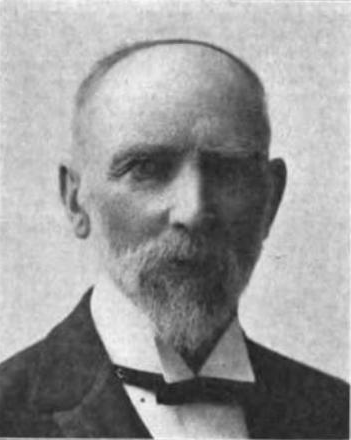
- Born: 11 November 1832; Coolycarney, County Wexford, Ireland
- Died: 9 January 1926 (aged 93); St. Catharines, Ontario
- Occupation: Civil engineer

Martin Murphy (11 November 1832 – 9 January 1926) was an Irish-born Canadian civil engineer.

Murphy was educated at public schools and privately, and began engineering work in 1852 on the Midland Great Western Railway. He was resident engineer of the Dublin, Wicklow, and Wexford Railway from 1862 to 1868, when he went to Canada and served for a year as engineer for the city of Halifax. He was chief engineer for the survey of projected Nova Scotia railways in 1870-71 and contracted for the building of Intercolonial Railway bridges in 1871–74. For 30 years (1875–1905) he was provisional engineer for Nova Scotia, and in 1906 was appointed government inspecting engineer of the National Transcontinental Railway, western division. He was president of the Nova Scotia Institute of Science (1882–83) and of the Canadian Society of Civil Engineers (1902). His views on and illustrations of bridge work won high recognition from the Engineering Congress at the Chicago World's Fair (1893).
