= Kieran Murphy (cyclist) =

Australian Paralympic cyclist

Personal information
- Full name: Kieran Jon Murphy
- Nationality: Australian
- Born: 3 August 1992 (age 33) South Australia
- Height: 175 cm (5 ft 9 in)
- Weight: 71 kg (157 lb)

Sport
- Sport: Cycling
- Disability: Legally Blind
- Disability class: B2 (Tandem)
Medal record
Men's Cycling
Representing Australia
UCI Para-cycling Track World Championships
Silver medal – second place	2017 Los Angeles	Men's 4 km Individual Pursuit B
Bronze medal – third place	2017 Los Angeles	Men's 1 km B

Kieran Jon Murphy is a visually impaired Australian Para tandem cyclist. He won two medals at the 2017 UCI Para-cycling Track World Championships.

== Personal ==
Murphy was born at Modbury Hospital in South Australia to his parents Zoe and Scott Murphy. He has three brothers; Joshua, Liam and Declan. He was born with a deteriorating eye condition that will one day leave him blind.

== Cycling ==
Murphy initially began his career as a swimmer. Competing at 13 national championships between 2008 and 2014. Four weeks after taking up cycling, he competed at the 2014 National Road and Time Trial Championships. His role model is Kieran Modra who also started as a swimmer and then moved onto cycling.

Murphy with his pilot Lachlan Glasspool won silver medal in the Men's 4 km Individual Pursuit B and bronze medal in the Men's 1 km Time Trial B at the 2017 UCI Para-cycling Track World Championships in Los Angeles, United States

At the 2017 UCI Para-cycling Road World Championships, Pietermaritzburg, South Africa, Murphy and his pilot Lachlan Glasspool finished tenth in the Men's Time Trial B and did not finish in the Men' Road Race B.

In 2017, he is a scholarship holder at the South Australian Sports Institute. He is a member of Mercedes – Benz Adelaide Racing.
