= Edward Henry Murphy =

Irish painter

- Born: 1796; Dublin, Ireland
- Died: 1841 (aged 44–45); Dublin
- Occupation: painter

Edward Henry Murphy (c. 1796- 1841) was an Irish painter of flowers, birds and still life.

== Life ==
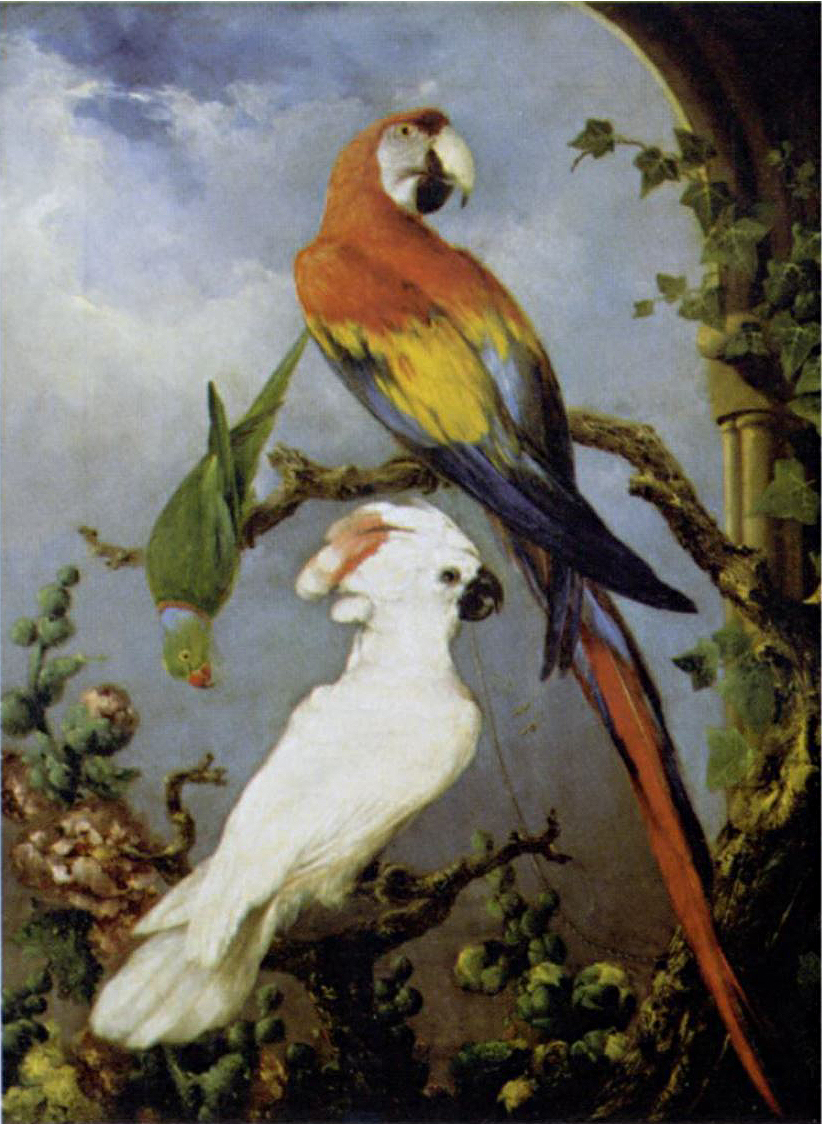
"Paroquets" (c. 1830) held in the National Gallery of Ireland

Edward Henry Murphy was born in Dublin around 1796. He studied art at the School of the Royal Dublin Society. He also produced caricatures for the Dublin media. He taught art, painted flower and fruit pieces and, on occasion, landscapes. He exhibited mainly in Dublin in the period 1812 to 1821, and with the Royal Hibernian Academy from 1826 to 1841, to which he was elected an Associate in November 1829.

Murphy lived at 15 Paradise Row until 1817, then moving to 5 Spring Garden Parade, and finally 21 Lower Gloucester Street. He died by suicide in 1841.

The National Gallery of Ireland hold his painting "Paroquets" (c. 1830), which earlier belonged to Sir Maziere Brady, Bart., former Lord Chancellor of Ireland. The NGI state that this is his finest known work, and describe Murphy as "enigmatic".

A newly discovered painting by Murphy, a still life, was exhibited by the Gorry Gallery in June 2023.
