= Jim Murphy (footballer, born 1942) =

Scottish footballer

Personal information
- Full name: James Turnbull Murphy
- Date of birth: 29 November 1942 (age 83)
- Place of birth: Larkhall, Scotland
- Position: Inside forward

Senior career*
Years	Team	Apps	(Gls)
1962–1963	Alloa Athletic	27	(18)
1963–1967	Heart of Midlothian	35	(16)
1967–1968	Raith Rovers	11	(1)
1968–1969	Notts County	33	(7)
1969–1970	Motherwell	25	(4)
1970–1971	Hamilton Academical	26	(7)
1971–1974	East Stirlingshire	69	(8)
Total		226	(61)
- * Club domestic league appearances and goals

James Baird Murphy (born 29 November 1942) is a Scottish former professional footballer who played in the Football League, as an inside forward.
