= Richard Murphy (marine ecologist) =

American marine ecologist (born 1942)

Richard C. Murphy
- Born: 1942 (age 83–84)
- Occupation: Ecologist
- Title: Director of Science and Education for Jean-Michel Cousteau's Ocean Futures Society
- Website: http://www.rcmurph.com/index.htm#repeat

Richard C. Murphy "Murph" (born 1942) is an American marine ecologist and an author of two books. He earned his Ph.D. from the University of Southern California. His specialty is marine ecology. He currently lives in Bonny Doon, California.

== Biography ==
=== Education ===
Murphy earned a B.A. in Zoology (University of California at Los Angeles, 1966) and an M.A. in Marine Biology (California State University at Long Beach, 1969), with a focus on the neuroanatomy (pineal organ) of bluefin tuna. He received a Ph.D. in Marine/Systems Ecology from the University of Southern California in 1982. His research focused on benthic community metabolism and population ecology of infauna.

=== Career ===
Murphy began working with Jean-Michel Cousteau and his father, Jacques Cousteau, in 1968. Starting in 1973, Richard has worked with Jean-Michel Cousteau in creating field study programs for students of all ages. The Ambassadors of the Environment program is the most recent of their educational programs. He has been involved with many projects and expeditions in a vast amount of remote areas around the globe. Dr. Murphy's role in these expeditions has included serving as chief scientist, photographer, writer, educator, or project director. He has participated in Cousteau expeditions conducted in many places such as Papua New Guinea, Fiji Islands, the Caribbean, Indonesia, The Mekong River in SE Asia, the Amazon, Sea of Cortez, Australia and New Zealand. For the last 15 years, Murphy has been the director of science and education for Jean-Michel Cousteau's Ocean Futures Society, a foundation which promotes ocean exploration around the world and educates about protection of ocean ecology.

Murphy is an experienced scuba diver and has been on thousands of dives.

Murphy is one of the 2019-2020 Honorary Member of the Board of Directors at the Seymour Marine Discovery Center in Santa Cruz, California

== Works ==
=== Books ===
- Murphy, Richard. C. 2002. Coral Reefs: Cities Under the Sea. Darwin Press, Princeton, N.J.
- Murphy, Richard. C., Stacey, Pamela. 2005. Water Alive. Water Proof Durabook, New York, N.Y.

=== Reports and papers presented ===
- Murphy, Richard C. 1971. The structure and ultrastructure of the pineal organ of the bluefin tuna, Thunnus thynnus. J. Morph. 133(1):1-16.
- Murphy, Richard C. 1983. The introduced bivalve, Mercenaria mercenaria in a shallow coastal ecosystem: 1) Factors affecting its distribution, 2) Contribution to benthic community metabolism. Ph.D. Dissertation. University of Southern California.
- Murphy, Richard C. and James N. Kremer. 1983. Community metabolism of Clipperton Lagoon, a coral atoll in the Eastern Pacific. Bull. of Mar. Sci. 33(1):152-164.
- Murphy, R.C. 1985. Waste water and California's Marine Environment. Paper presented to: 57th Annual California Water Pollution Control Association Conference. May 8, 1985, Anaheim, CA.
- Murphy, R.C., and J.N. Kremer. 1992. Benthic community metabolism and the role of deposit-feeding callianassid shrimp. Journal of Marine Research 50:321-340.
- Murphy, R. C. 1996. A plea for white shark conservation. Pages 5–6 in Klimley, A.P. and D.G. Ainley (eds.) Great White Sharks: The Biology of Carcharodon carcharias. Academic press, San Diego.

=== Publications and conferences ===
- Murphy, R. C. 1997. Environmental Responsibility At The Jean-Michel Cousteau Fiji Islands Resort. Invited Speaker. World Ecotour 1997, Brazil
- Murphy, Richard C. 2000/2001. Kelp beds and coral reefs – A new vision for the next generation. Ocean Realm Magazine. pp 50–53.
- Murphy, R. C. 2002. Ambassadors of the Environment Educational Program - A New Vision for the Next Generation. Invited speaker. American Camping Association National Convention, Washington, D.C.
- Cousteau, J.M. and R.C. Murphy. 2002. Saving Coral Reefs - Doing Well by Doing Good (a series of articles on coral reefs and 2002 year of ecotourism). In press with the following dive magazines: Immersion Dive Magazine – Spain, Oceans Magazine – France, Ocean Magazine – Czech Republic, Tauchen Dive Magazine – Germany, Dyk Magazine – Scandinavia, Sport Diving Magazine – Australia, Dive New Zealand – New Zealand, Aventura Magazine– Argentina, Diver Magazine – Britain.
- Murphy, R. C. 2002 "Ecotourism's Underwater World – The Cousteau Story." Invited Speaker. Pacific Economic Cooperation Council. Quito, Ecuador.
- Murphy, R. C. 2003. Coral Reefs: Challenges and Opportunities for Responsible Tourism. Maine Ecotourism Workshop. Ecotourism and Adventure Travel: World Innovations – New Experiences, Expoecoturismo Conference, Venezuela.
- Murphy, R. C. 2003. Sustainable Reefs – a new approach to coral reef awareness and action. Invited speaker. 56th Annual Conference of the Gulf and Caribbean Fisheries Institute, Tortola, British Virgin Islands
