= Eddie Murray (footballer) =

English footballer

Personal information
- Full name: Edward James Murray
- Date of birth: 10 July 1962 (age 64)
- Place of birth: Crosby, England
- Position: Winger

Senior career*
Years	Team	Apps	(Gls)
1987–1989	Tranmere Rovers	27	(1)
- * Club domestic league appearances and goals

Eddie Murray (born 10 July 1962) is an English footballer, who played as a winger in the Football League for Tranmere Rovers.
