= Timothy Murphy =

Timothy Murphy may refer to:

== Politics ==
- Tim Murphy (Pennsylvania politician) (1952–2026), American Republican Party politician from Pennsylvania
- Tim Murphy (Florida politician) (born 1946), member of the Florida House of Representatives
- Tim Murphy (Canadian politician) (born 1959), Canadian politician
- Timothy J. Murphy (1893–1949), Irish Labour Party politician

== Sports ==
- Tim Murphy (Australian footballer) (1878–1902), Australian rules footballer
- Tim Murphy (American football) (born 1956), American football coach
- Tim Murphy (hurler) (born 1952), retired Irish hurling manager and former player
- Timmy Murphy (born 1974), Irish jockey

== Other ==
- Timothy Murphy (sniper) (1751–1818), sniper in the American Revolutionary War
- Timothy L. Murphy (1816–1897), president of Santa Clara University
- Timothy D. Murphy (1885–1928), aka Big Tim, Chicago mobster and labor racketeer
- Timothy Murphy (poet) (1951–2018), American poet, farmer, and businessman
- Timothy P. Murphy, American law enforcement officer and FBI deputy director (2010–11)
- Timothy Patrick Murphy (1959–1988), American film and television actor
- Timothy V. Murphy (born 1960), Irish-born film and television actor
- Tim Murphy (Jurassic Park character), fictional character, in the Jurassic Park franchise
- Tim Murphy, publisher of National Mortgage News
