= Jimmy Murphy (footballer) =

Welsh footballer and manager (1910-1989)

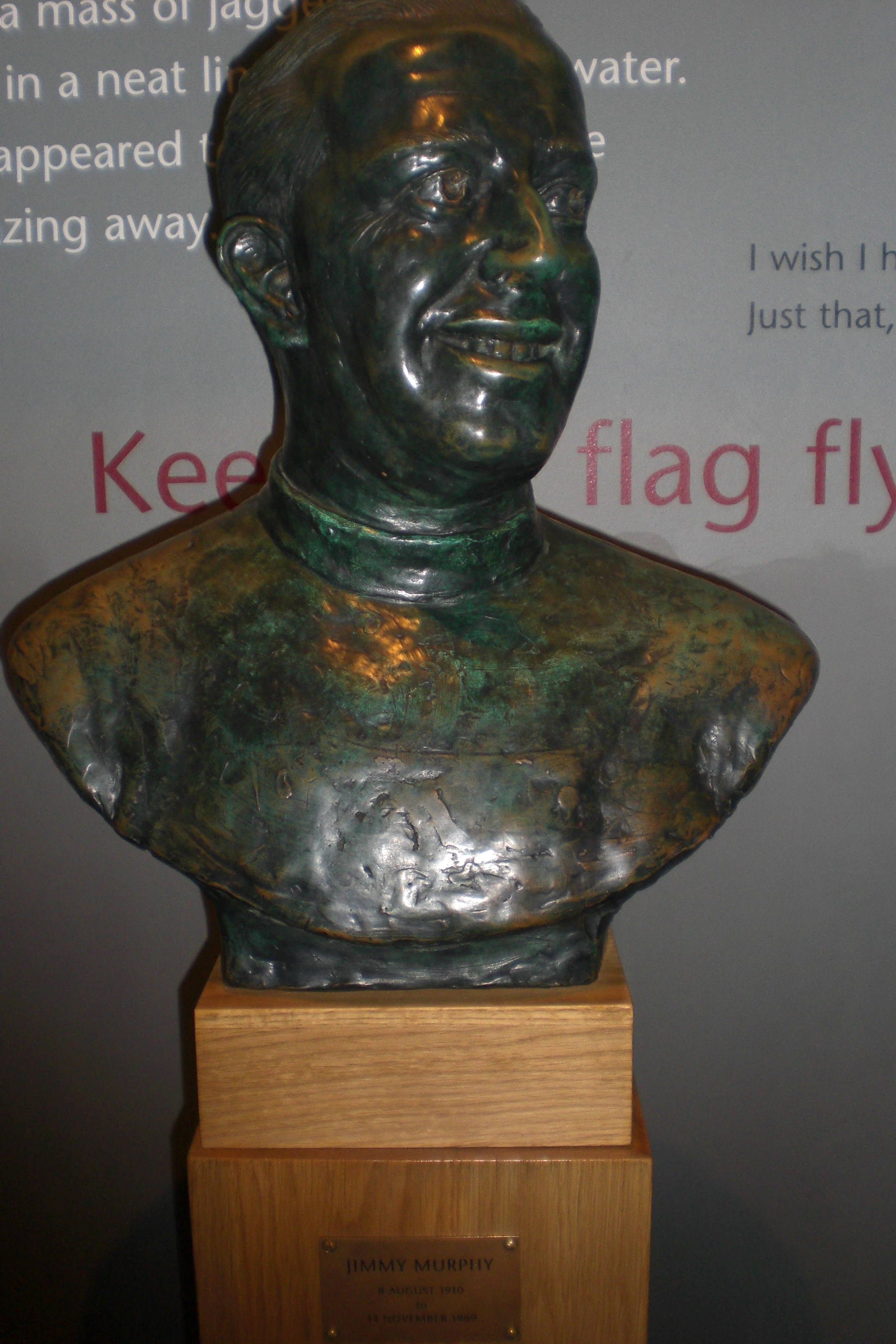

Personal information
- Full name: James Patrick Murphy
- Date of birth: 8 August 1910
- Place of birth: Pentre, Rhondda, Wales
- Date of death: 14 November 1989 (aged 79)
- Place of death: Manchester, England
- Height: 5 ft 8 in (1.73 m)
- Position: Wing half

Senior career*
Years	Team	Apps	(Gls)
1928–1939	West Bromwich Albion	204	(0)
1939	Swindon Town	4	(0)
Total		208	(0)

International career
1933–1938	Wales	15	(0)

Managerial career
- 1956–1964: Wales
- 1958: Manchester United (caretaker)
- * Club domestic league appearances and goals

James Patrick Murphy (8 August 1910 – 14 November 1989) was a Welsh footballer who made over 200 appearances for West Bromwich Albion and won 15 caps for the Wales national team, which he later managed. Murphy is most famous for being an influential figure at Manchester United from 1946 until the 1970s, as assistant manager, first-team coach, reserve team manager and a full-time scout, although he disliked the limelight and preferred to work quietly behind the scenes.

Following the Munich air disaster on 6 February 1958, Murphy temporarily took over as Manchester United manager until the end of the 1957–58 season, steering the club through its greatest crisis while Matt Busby recovered from his injuries, and put together a makeshift team in place of the players who had died or were recovering from their injuries. Murphy had not been on the Munich aeroplane, as he had missed the trip in order to take charge of Wales in a 1958 FIFA World Cup qualifying match against Israel in Cardiff on the same night as Manchester United's match against Red Star Belgrade in Yugoslavia. Wales won the match and qualified for the FIFA World Cup for the first time.

== Playing career ==
Born in Ton Pentre, Glamorgan, Murphy attended the local village school, Ton Pentre School. As a boy, he played the church organ. As a youth he played football for Ton Pentre Boys, Treorchy Thursday F.C., Treorchy Juniors and Mid-Rhondda Boys and in 1924 represented Wales in a schoolboy international against England in Cardiff. He turned professional in February 1928 when he joined West Bromwich Albion as a 17-year-old.

Murphy made his debut in a 1–0 defeat away to Blackpool on 5 March 1930 and played one further league game during his first season. In the following season, 1930–31, West Bromwich Albion won the FA Cup and promotion from the Second Division, but Murphy had yet to establish himself in the team and again made just two appearances. He became a regular in the Albion side upon the club's return to the First Division; from 1931–32 to 1934–35 he appeared 149 times in league and cup, helping his team to achieve four consecutive top ten finishes, including fourth place in 1932–33. The 1934–35 season saw Murphy miss just one match all season, and he helped Albion to reach the 1935 FA Cup Final, which they lost 4–2 to Sheffield Wednesday.

Murphy played more than 200 times for Albion, before moving to Swindon Town in 1939, but the Second World War ended his spell at Swindon almost as soon as it had begun. Murphy was also called up to the Welsh national team during the 1930s, winning 15 caps.

== Managerial career ==
During the Second World War, Murphy was giving a speech about football to a band of troops, and in attendance with Matt Busby. Busby was so impressed by Murphy's speech that, upon his appointment as manager of Manchester United, he made Murphy the first signing of his tenure at the club. Murphy had the role of "chief coach" from 1946 until 1955, and became assistant manager in 1955 after Manchester United won their third consecutive FA Youth Cup. It was Murphy's responsibility at the club to train the young footballers who were to become the "Busby Babes", which included Duncan Edwards and Bobby Charlton. Prior to this the larger teams had mainly bought rather than developed their players but instead Busby decided to slowly replace the older and more experienced players in his team with their youth players.

After the Munich air disaster of 6 February 1958, he temporarily took over as manager while Matt Busby recovered from his injuries and, having assembled a substitute team, steered United to the 1958 FA Cup Final. Murphy had not been on the fatal flight because he had been away managing Wales in a World Cup qualifying game. Murphy managed Wales at the 1958 FIFA World Cup in Sweden when they reached the quarter-finals. They lost 1–0 to eventual champions Brazil, after a goal by Pelé.

Despite being approached to manage Brazil, Juventus and Arsenal, he remained as assistant manager at Old Trafford until 1971. Murphy chose never to become manager of the club because of his hate of the limelight, he loved working in the background but never aspired to fulfil the job of club manager.

From 1973, Murphy did scouting work for Manchester United, most famously during the managerial reign of Tommy Docherty, when Murphy urged Docherty to sign wingers Steve Coppell and Gordon Hill.

Murphy died suddenly and unexpectedly of a burst aorta on 14 November 1989, aged 79. In Murphy's honour, Manchester United commissioned the "Jimmy Murphy Young Player of the Year Award", to be given to the best player in the club's youth system in the previous season. It was first awarded the summer after Murphy's death, with Lee Martin receiving the inaugural award.

On 23 March 2009, a blue plaque was placed on his former family home in Treharne Street, Pentre.

On 28 May 2021, Manchester United announced plans to honour Murphy with a memorial at Old Trafford. On 3 May 2023, a statue of Murphy was unveiled behind the Stretford End at Old Trafford.

He was portrayed by Philip Madoc in the 2000 film Best, and by David Tennant in the 2011 BBC Two film United, which centred on the Busby Babes and the Munich air disaster.

== Personal life ==
Murphy married Winifred Powell at West Bromwich in 1935, and they had six children, Patricia (born 1936), John (born 1939), Philip (born 1941), Jimmy Jr. (born 1942), Nicholas (born 1946) and Anne (born 1949). They were married for 54 years until his death. Winifred outlived him by nine years, dying in 1998 at the age of 84.

== Career statistics ==
=== Player ===
Club	Season	League		FA Cup		Total	
Club	Season	App	Goals	App	Goals	App	Goals
West Bromwich Albion	1929–30	2	0	0	0	2	0
West Bromwich Albion	1930–31	2	0	0	0	2	0
West Bromwich Albion	1931–32	27	0	1	0	28	0
West Bromwich Albion	1932–33	34	0	2	0	36	0
West Bromwich Albion	1933–34	35	0	2	0	37	0
West Bromwich Albion	1934–35	41	0	7	0	48	0
West Bromwich Albion	1935–36	16	0	0	0	16	0
West Bromwich Albion	1936–37	21	0	5	0	26	0
West Bromwich Albion	1937–38	23	0	2	0	25	0
West Bromwich Albion	1938–39	3	0	0	0	3	0
West Bromwich Albion	Total	204	0	19	0	223	0
Swindon Town	1939–40	4	0	0	0	4	0
Career totals		208	0	19	0	227	0

=== Roles at Manchester United ===
- Manager (temporary) (1958) – took over for five months after the Munich air disaster
- Assistant manager (1955–1971)
- Chief coach (1946–1955)
- Reserve team manager (1946–1964)
- Full-time scout (1946–1969 and 1973–1977)
- Scouting office clerk (1971–1973)
- Part-time scout (1977–1989)

=== Managerial record ===
Managerial record by team and tenure
Team	From	To	Record				
Team	From	To	P	W	D	L	Win %
Wales	20 October 1956	20 November 1963	43	11	13	19	25.58
Manchester United (caretaker)	7 February 1958	30 June 1958	22	5	7	10	22.73
Total			65	16	20	29	24.62

== Honours ==
West Bromwich Albion

- FA Cup runner-up: 1934–35

Sporting positions
Preceded by Louis Rocca	Manchester United F.C. assistant manager 1955–1971	Succeeded by Malcolm Musgrove
