= Matt Murphy (Indiana politician) =

American politician

Mayor of Valparaiso, Indiana
- In office 1 January 2020 – 1 January 2024
- Preceded by: Jon Costas
- Succeeded by: Jon Costas

Member of the Valparaiso City Council Representing District 3
- In office 2015–2020

Personal details
- Born: Matthew Murphy Valparaiso, Indiana, United States
- Party: Republican
- Spouse: Polly
- Children: 4
- Education: Indiana University Northwest; Valparaiso University

Matthew "Matt" R. Murphy is an American politician who served as Mayor of Valparaiso, Indiana from 2020 to 2024.

== Biography ==
Matt Murphy was born and grew up in Valparaiso, Indiana. His father was an elected official of Porter County, Indiana who served as the county's treasurer and auditor. He attended Valparaiso High School and received his Master of Business Administration at Valparaiso University in 2009 after the tail of his undergraduate years at Indiana University Northwest.

== Mayor of Valparaiso, Indiana ==
=== Environment ===
Under Murphy's administration, 772 solar panels were installed on several of Valparaiso's city facilities. Valparaiso won Indiana's Green Project of 2023.
