= James D. Murphy =

- Born: August 26, 1964; Kentucky
- Known for: Founder & CEO, Afterburner Inc

James D. "Murph" Murphy (born 1964) is an American businessman and founder of Afterburner Inc, a business consulting firm. Prior to founding Afterburner Inc, Murphy served as a fighter pilot for the U.S. Air Force. He logged over 1,200 hours as an instructor pilot in the F-15 and accumulated over 3,200 hours of flight time in other high-performance aircraft and served as the 116th Fighter Wing's Chief of Training for the Georgia Air National Guard. He flew missions to Central America, Asia, Central Europe and the Middle East.

== Early life and career ==
Born August 26, 1964, in Jacksonville, FL, Murphy grew up in his parents' home state of Kentucky.

== Education ==
Attended the University of Kentucky where he was a varsity Kentucky Wildcats baseball player.

== Career ==
Murphy is the Founder and CEO of Afterburner Inc. Founded in 1996, Afterburner is a management consulting and training firm composed of more than 80 current and former military professionals. He is the author of seven books that range in topic from leadership and management development to veteran career transition.

Besides consulting for the Global 2000, Jim Murphy and Afterburner worked with the New York Giants during their 2011 Super Bowl Championship season.

Afterburner has been on the Inc 500/5000 List of America's Fastest Growing Companies four times and made the Forbes Magazine's Small Giants List. Afterburner has worked with 85% of the U.S. Fortune 50 and many Global 1000 corporations in 24 countries. Afterburner's work has been featured in The Wall Street Journal, Business Week, Financial Times, Newsweek, and Meetings and Conventions Magazine; and on national media networks like CNN, Fox News, and Bloomberg News.

== Books ==
- On Time, On Target, James D. Murphy & Christian Boucousis, Allen & Unwin, 2016
- Flawless Execution, James D. Murphy, HarperCollins, 2005
- Down Range, James D. Murphy & William M. Duke, John Wiley & Sons 2014
- Courage to Execute, James D. Murphy, John Wiley & Sons 2014
- The Debrief Imperative, James D. Murphy & William M. Duke
- Business is Combat, James D. Murphy, Regan Books, 2000
