= Mary Murphy =

Mary Murphy may refer to:

- Mary Murphy (actress) (1931–2011), American actress
- Mary Murphy (basketball) (born 1957), American basketball analyst
- Mary Murphy (choreographer) (born 1958), American choreographer, reality TV show judge
- Mary Murphy (Minnesota politician) (1939–2024), American politician and member of the Minnesota House of Representatives
- Mary Murphy (New Hampshire politician)
- Mary Murphy (news personality), American television personality, print journalist and author
- Mary Travers Murphy (born 1958), executive director of the Family Justice Center of Erie County
- Mary Murphy Mine, Chaffee County, Colorado
