= Patrick Murphy (producer) =

American television producer

- Occupation: Producer
- Years active: 1981–present

Patrick Murphy is an American television producer for the Nine Network of Public Media, the Public Broadcasting Service (PBS) affiliate in St. Louis, Missouri. He also serves as the station's vice president of production.

Since 1981, Murphy has been known as "Voice of Channel 9", producing and narrating such programming as the popular Living St. Louis and the nationally distributed A Time for Champions, chronicling the St. Louis University soccer dynasty of the 1960s and 70s. He has also worked locally on many of PBS's national projects such as The War and Facing the Mortgage Crisis, an effort that was managed by The Nine Network.

Murphy has been honored for his work in television with four Emmys, two Auroras and numerous Tellys.
