= Myles Murphy =

Myles Murphy may refer to:

- Myles Murphy (painter) (1927–2016), English painter
- Myles Murphy (American football) (born 2002), American football player

== See also ==
- Miles Murphy (born 1967), Australian sprinter
