= Erin Murphy (disambiguation) =

Erin Murphy (born 1964) is an American actress.

Erin Murphy may also refer to:

- Erin Murphy (poet) (fl. 2000s), American poet
- Erin Murphy (Minnesota politician) (born 1960), American politician from Minnesota
- Erin Murphy (Massachusetts politician), American politician from Massachusetts
