= Justice Murphy (disambiguation) =

Justice Murphy refers to Frank Murphy (1890–1949), associate justice of the United States Supreme Court. Justice Murphy may also refer to:

- John Luttrell Murphy (1842–1912), justice of the Territorial Montana Supreme Court
- Lionel Murphy (1922–1986), justice of the High Court of Australia
- Loren E. Murphy (1882–1963), associate justice and chief justice of the Illinois Supreme Court
- Michael A. Murphy (1837–1909), associate justice of the Supreme Court of Nevada
- Robert C. Murphy (judge) (1926–2000), chief judge of the Maryland Court of Appeals
- Thomas W. Murphy (American Samoa judge) (1935–1992), associate chief justice of the High Court of American Samoa
- William P. Murphy (judge) (1898–1986), associate justice of the Minnesota Supreme Court

== See also ==
- Alonzo Morphy (1798–1856), associate justice of the Louisiana Supreme Court
- Judge Murphy (disambiguation)
