= Lawrence Murphy (disambiguation) =

Lawrence Murphy (1831–1878) was an Irish-American businessman of the Old West, and a main instigator of the Lincoln County War.

Lawrence Murphy may also refer to:

- Lawrence P. Murphy (1910–1975), American politician in the New York State Assembly
- Lawrence C Murphy, accused of child abuse while a Roman Catholic priest
- Larry Murphy (actor) (Lawrence Murphy Jr., born 1972), American actor, voice actor and comedian
- Larry Murphy (ice hockey) (Lawrence Thomas Murphy, born 1961), Canadian ice hockey defenceman
- Lawrence Murphy, character in Young Guns

== See also ==
- Larry Murphy (disambiguation)
