= Phil Murphy (disambiguation) =

Phil Murphy (born 1957) is an American financier, diplomat, politician and Governor of New Jersey.

Phil or Philip Murphy may also refer to:

- Phil Murphy (rugby union, born 1976), Canadian rugby union player
- Phil Murphy (rugby union, born 1980), English rugby union player
- Phil Murphy (footballer) (born 1960), English footballer
- Phil Murphy (American football) (born 1957), American football defensive tackle
- Philip Francis Murphy (1933–1999), American clergyman
