= Eddie Murphy (footballer, born 1934) =

Scottish footballer (1934–1983)

Personal information
- Full name: Edward Cullinane Murphy
- Date of birth: 1 June 1934
- Place of birth: Glasgow, Scotland
- Date of death: 14 May 1983 (aged 48)
- Place of death: Frankston, Victoria, Australia
- Position: Defender

Senior career*
Years	Team	Apps	(Gls)
1953–1956	Clyde	26	(0)
1956–1959	Oldham Athletic	72	(0)
1959–1960	Bangor City	?	(?)
Total		98	(0)
- * Club domestic league appearances and goals

Edward Cullinane Murphy (1 June 1934 – 14 May 1983) was a Scottish professional footballer who played in the Football League as a defender. Murphy died in Frankston, Victoria, Australia on 14 May 1983, at the age of 48.
