= Jamie Murphy =

Jamie Murphy may refer to:

- Jamie Murphy (footballer, born 1971), English football striker
- Jamie Murphy (footballer, born 1973), English footballer
- Jamie Murphy (footballer, born 1989), Scottish footballer
- Jamie Murphy (rugby) (born 1989), Welsh rugby league player
- Jamie Murphy (Space guitarist) (born 1975), English musician
- Jamie Murphy (curler) (born 1981), Canadian curler

== See also ==
- James Murphy (disambiguation)
