= Eddie Murphy (footballer, born 1881) =

English footballer

Personal information
- Full name: Edward Murphy
- Date of birth: April 1881
- Place of birth: Tunstall, England
- Date of death: 25 May 1916 (aged 35)
- Place of death: London, England
- Positions: Outside left; inside left

Senior career*
Years	Team	Apps	(Gls)
–1902	Tunstall Crosswell's		
1902–1904	Glossop	86	(18)
1905–1906	Bury	27	(1)
1906	Gainsborough Trinity	0	(0)
1906–1907	Swindon Town	36	(6)
1907–1908	Bristol Rovers	2	(1)
1908	Denaby United		
1908–1909	Biddulph Mission		
1909–1910	St George's Victoria		
1910–1911	Silverwood Colliery		
1911	South Kirkby Colliery		
- * Club domestic league appearances and goals

Edward Murphy (April 1881 – 25 May 1916) was an English professional footballer who played as a forward in the Football League for Glossop and Bury.

== Personal life ==
Murphy served as a private in the North Staffordshire Regiment during the First World War and was gassed at Wulverghem. He was evacuated to Britain and died of his wounds at King George V Military Hospital, London on 25 May 1916. Murphy was buried in Tunstall Cemetery, Stoke-on-Trent.

== Career statistics ==
Appearances and goals by club, season and competition
Club	Season	League			FA Cup		Total	
Club	Season	Division	Apps	Goals	Apps	Goals	Apps	Goals
Swindon Town	1906–07	Southern League First Division	36	6	1	0	37	6
Bristol Rovers	1907–08	Southern League First Division	2	1	0	0	2	1
Career total			38	7	1	0	39	7
