= Kevin Mark Murphy =

Canadian musician and criminal lawyer (born 1957)

- Born: May 24, 1957 (age 69); Toronto, Ontario, Canada
- Occupations: Lawyer, musician

Kevin Mark Murphy (born May 24, 1957) is a Canadian musician and criminal lawyer, best known as a co-founder of the Ottawa-based music group, Singing Fools.

The non-performing duo gained national prominence in 1985 with their nuclear-themed dance record, "The Apocalypso" and were signed to a short-lived recording contract with A&M Records.

Murphy also gained notoriety as an outspoken criminal defence lawyer and was publicly rebuked for his controversial conduct in a 1998 Ontario murder trial which led to the public disciplining and eventual censure of the presiding judge, Paul Cosgrove.

Murphy obtained a B.A. in political science from Carleton University in 1976 and a M.Sc.(Econ.) in comparative government from the London School of Economics in 1979. He completed a law degree at the University of Ottawa in 1991 and was admitted to the Bar of Ontario in 1993.

In his third year of practice as a defence lawyer in 1995, Murphy defended a Barbados business woman, Julia Elliott, who was charged with the grisly murder and dismemberment of a Kemptville, Ontario man, Lawrence Foster. After a protracted series of defence motions, he persuaded Cosgrove to stay the charges after convincing him that his client's rights to a fair trial under the Canadian Charter of Rights and Freedoms had been violated 150 times by police and prosecutors.

Cosgrove's ruling provoked an immediate appeal by senior lawyers in the Ontario attorney general's department, some of whom had been impugned by name in Cosgrove's written reasons. In 2003, the stay was overturned by the Court of Appeal for Ontario. Elliott was extradited to Canada in 2005 where she eventually pleaded guilty to manslaughter for the killing.

The Ontario attorney general, Michael Bryant, filed two disciplinary complaints in relation to the case — the first against Cosgrove to the Canadian Judicial Council and the second against Murphy to the Law Society of Upper Canada. Cosgrove was subjected to a scathing public inquiry into his handling of the case in 2008 and soon after resigned from the bench.

In January 2010, a decade after Cosgrove's controversial ruling, Murphy was disciplined by a Law Society disciplinary panel for "uncivil" conduct towards Crown lawyers and witnesses in the case, despite an acknowledgment by the panel chair that Murphy's conduct during the trial had been condoned, if not encouraged by the presiding trial judge. In the result, Murphy was suspended from practising law — having become a federal drug prosecutor in 2008 — for six months and fined $10,000 in costs.

Murphy has served as senior counsel with the Public Prosecution Service of Canada since February 2020.
