= Seamus Murphy (filmmaker) =

Irish documentary photographer and filmmaker

- Born: 1959 (age 66–67); Essex, England
- Occupations: Documentary photographer, filmmaker, cinematographer
- Years active: 1980s–present

Seamus Murphy (born 1 October 1959 in Essex, England) is an Irish documentary photographer and filmmaker.

His photographs have been exhibited internationally and are in the collections of The Getty Museum LA, Imperial War Museum UK, National Gallery of Ireland and FRAC, Auvergne, France.

His work has been featured in international media, including The New York Times Magazine, The New Yorker, Newsweek, Time, National Geographic, The Observer, The Sunday Times Magazine, Granta, Stern Magazine, Paris Match, BBC, CNN, Al Jazeera, The Irish Times.

== Career ==
Murphy grew up in Dublin; his family moved back to Ireland from England when he was six months old. He studied at Trinity College Dublin and Dublin Institute of Technology Rathmines. He left Ireland in 1983, and since 1987, based himself in London. After working briefly in the film industry in the UK, he became an editorial/documentary photographer, travelling widely and covering international news and stories, whilst always pursuing independent and personal projects. .

== Awards ==
Murphy has won multiple World Press Photo awards for his work produced in Afghanistan, Gaza, Lebanon, Sierra Leone, Peru, the United Kingdom and Ireland.

He received the World Understanding Award from Pictures of the Year International (POYi) in 2005 for his Afghanistan project.

A documentary film produced by MediaStorm, shot by Murphy and based on his photography and journalism from Afghanistan won the Liberty in Media Prize in 2011 and was shortlisted for an Emmy Award

== Books ==
Murphy is the author of five books:

- A Darkness Visible: Afghanistan (Saqi Books, 2008) - Based on 12 trips to the country between 1994 and 2007, it is a chronicle of Afghanistan’s recent history.
- I Am The Beggar of the World (Farrar, Straus and Giroux, 2014), co-authored with Eliza Griswold - a rare glimpse into the lives of Afghan women through their own anonymous Landay poetry.
- The Hollow of the Hand (Bloomsbury, 2015), a photography and poetry book, made in collaboration with PJ Harvey. The book is an exploration of the artistic collaboration between Murphy and Harvey, covering their travels together to Kosovo, Afghanistan and America. The project also yielded Harvey’s album The Hope Six Demolition Project and Murphys feature documentary film, A Dog Called Money, an investigation into the creative process, a record of the creation of the album as an art installation, and a chronicle of the people and stories the pair encountered on their journeys.
- The Republic (Allen Lane, 2016) - a personal and immediate photographic journey around his native Ireland in advance of the centenary of its revolution.
- Strange Love (Setanta Books, 2025) - Created over many years, Strange Love challenges the conventional narrative of natural enemies, offering astriking visual exploration of life in post-industrial America and Russia. Murphy uncovers unexpected similarities between the two nations, prompting a fundamental question: can we always distinguish between them in a set of photographs?

== Film ==
Murphy shot and directed:

A Dog Called Money (2019), a feature-length documentary on his collaboration with PJ Harvey, linking the creative process with its sources. It premiered at the Berlin International Film Festival.

The Peculiar Sensation of Being Pat Ingoldsby (2022), a documentary portrait of the Irish poet and broadcaster Pat Ingoldsby. He has made short films for The New Yorker, Médecins Sans Frontières, Channel 4 News, VII Foundation.

He made short films for PJ Harvey’s albums Let England Shake and The Hope Six Demolition Project.

Patti Smith, already a fan of Polly’s music, listed The Words that Maketh Murder film in Artforum Magazine as number two of her Top 10 artworks, saying: “... this unheralded piece directed by Seamus Murphy is a wisp of humanity celebrating the small things.”

Murphy won the Q Award for Best Video in 2016 for his film for PJ Harvey’s song “The Community of Hope”.

Camera operator A Girl from Mogadishu (2019)

Second Unit DOP The Unlikely Pilgrimage of Harold Fry (2023)

== Exhibitions ==
Murphy’s work has been exhibited widely including:

- Imperial War Museum North (UK)
- Leica Gallery London (UK)
- OXO Gallery London (UK)
- Gallery 46 London (UK)
- J. Paul Getty Museum Los Angeles (USA)
- Institut du Monde Arabe Paris (France)
- Les Rencontres d’Arles (France)
- The Arts House Singapore
- MoLI: Museum of Literature Ireland (Ireland)
- The Little Museum of Dublin. (Ireland)[.

== Selected press, interviews, and reviews ==
Seamus Murphy's work and career have been widely covered in print, online media, and podcasts. Selected coverage includes:

- Eyeshot 50mm Interview Series: Documentary Photography and Visual Culture, May 2026.
- Amateur Photographer, review and interview of Strange Love, November 2025.
- Conversations with Tyler, podcast interview with Tyler Cowen, September 2025.
- The Irish Times, interview about Strange Love, June 2025.
- Mayfair Times, review and interview of The Republic exhibition at Leica Gallery, London, February 2025.
- PhotoWings, Seamus Murphy in Conversation with Eliza Griswold, February 2025.
- The Observer, review and interview of Strange Love, May 2025.
- 10FPS, podcast interview, May 2025.
- Global Center for Journalism and Trauma, Reflections on Covering Afghanistan, October 2022.
- The Irish Times, film review The Peculiar Sensation of Being Pat Ingoldsby, November 2022.
- Dublin Inquirer, film review The Peculiar Sensation of Being Pat Ingoldsby, November 2022.
- The Washington Post, art critique of a single photograph from Kabul, May 2022.
- The New York Times, film review A Dog Called Money, December 2020.
- TalkHouse, essay On the Road with House of Homeland, December 2020.
- BBC Radio 6 Music, PJ Harvey and Seamus Murphy interview about A Dog Called Money, November 2019.
- J. Paul Getty Museum, exhibition of Afghan family project in group show Once Again: Photographs in Series, July 2019.
- Crack Magazine, interview A Dog Called Money, February 2019.
- United Nations of Photography, A Photographic Life, September 2020.
- Film School Radio, interview A Dog Called Money, December 2020.
- Modern Times, review of film A Dog Called Money, February 2019.
- The Photography Channel, book review The Republic, January 2019.
- Poetry Magazine, Two and a Quarter: Observations on Poetry, October 2017.
- The Irish Times, interview about The Republic exhibition in Dublin, January 2017.
- The Guardian, article on Hollow of the Hand, September 2016.
- i-D Magazine, interview with Seamus Murphy and PJ Harvey on The Hollow of the Hand, July 2016.
- The Observer, review of The Republic, April 2016.
- The Washington Post, meeting Seamus Murphy and PJ Harvey in DC, March 2016.
- The Guardian, review of Hollow of the Hand at Royal Festival Hall, October 2015.
- The Quietus, review of Hollow of the Hand at Royal Festival Hall, October 2015.
- The Guardian, On the Road with PJ Harvey in Pictures, October 2015.
- Evening Standard, review of Hollow of the Hand at Royal Festival Hall, October 2015.
- Slate Magazine, review of I Am the Beggar of the World, March 2014.
- The Christian Science Monitor, review of I Am the Beggar of the World, April 2014.
- The New Yorker, article on photographers’ music videos, March 2012.
- MediaStorm, A Darkness Visible: Afghanistan, November 2011.
- Artforum, Patti Smith chooses Seamus Murphy’s music film The Words that Maketh Murder as one of her top 10 art pieces, October 2011.
- NPR, review of I Am the Beggar of the World, September 2011.
- Film Courage, Afghanistan by Seamus Murphy, September 2011.
- Slant Magazine, profile of Seamus Murphy as filmmaker, January 2011.
- The Siren Call, two films from Let England Shake, January 2011.
- The Digital Journalist, review of A Darkness Visible, August 2009.
- Frontline Club, interview with Jocelyn Bain Hogg, A Darkness Visible: Afghanistan, October 2008.
- Granta Magazine, article Preparing for War in Iraq, July 2008.
- BBC, The Making of Paradise Now, November 2005.
