= Danny Murphy (Australian footballer, born 1960) =

Australian rules footballer

Personal information
- Full name: Danny Murphy
- Born: 8 February 1960 (age 66)
- Original team: Wodonga
- Height: 150 cm (4 ft 11 in)
- Weight: 120 kg (265 lb)

Playing career^{1}
Years	Club	Games (Goals)
1980	North Melbourne	1 (0)
- ^{1} Playing statistics correct to the end of 1980.

Danny Murphy (born 8 February 1960) is a former Australian rules footballer who played with North Melbourne in the Victorian Football League (VFL).
