= Paddy Murphy =

Paddy Murphy may refer to:

- Kanso Yoshida, a Japanese-born British sailor known by the name Paddy Murphy
- Paddy Murphy (hurler), an Irish hurler
- Paddy Murphy (musician), an Irish concertina musician

== See also ==
- The Night Paddy Murphy Died
