= Stephanie J. Murphy =

American veterinary scientist

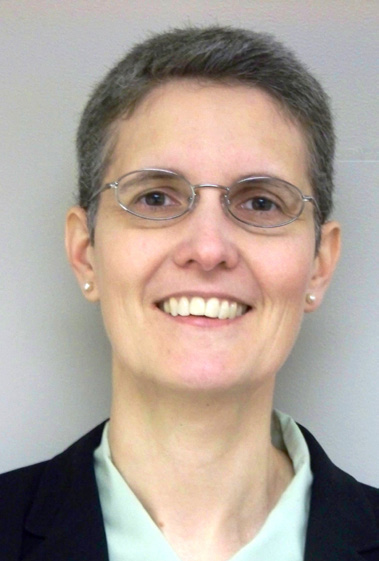
- Education: University of Pennsylvania
- Scientific career
- Workplaces: Johns Hopkins University; Oregon Health & Science University; Office of Research Infrastructure Programs

Stephanie J. Murphy is an American veterinary scientist. She is the director of the Division of Comparative Medicine (DCM) in the Office of Research Infrastructure Programs at the National Institutes of Health. Murphy was previously a faculty member at the Oregon Health & Science University.

== Education ==
Murphy received her V.M.D. and Ph.D. from the University of Pennsylvania. She completed a postdoctoral fellowship in the department of comparative medicine at Johns Hopkins University and is a diplomate of the American College of Laboratory Animal Medicine.

== Career ==
Murphy joined the department of anesthesiology & critical care medicine at Johns Hopkins as an assistant professor. In 2003, she joined the research faculty at Oregon Health & Science University (OHSU) as a professor of anesthesiology & perioperative medicine. In 2014, Murphy was named director, Division of Comparative Medicine (DCM) in the Office of Research Infrastructure Programs. In DCM, she oversees the human tissue and organ research resource and is the primary contact for R24 applications. Her expertise includes neuroscience and comparative medicine.

Murphy has published articles, reviews and book chapters related to her research and clinical interests. She has secured NIH and other funding for the past 17 years to support her research on sex differences and sex steroids in stroke.

== Selected publications ==
- Alkayed, Nabil J.; Murphy, Stephanie J.; Traystman, Richard J.; Hurn, Patricia D. (2000). "Neuroprotective Effects of Female Gonadal Steroids in Reproductively Senescent Female Rats". Stroke. 31 (1): 161–168. doi:10.1161/01.STR.31.1.161. ISSN 0039-2499. PMID 10625733.
- Kelly, Martin J.; Rønnekleiv, Oline K.; Scanlan, Thomas S.; Chambon, Pierre; Korach, Kenneth S.; Murphy, Stephanie J.; Graham, Sharon M.; Krust, Andree; Tobias, Sandra C. (May 24, 2006). "A G-Protein-Coupled Estrogen Receptor Is Involved in Hypothalamic Control of Energy Homeostasis". Journal of Neuroscience. 26 (21): 5649–5655. doi:10.1523/JNEUROSCI.0327-06.2006. ISSN 0270-6474. PMC 2678732. PMID 16723521.
- Kitano, Hideto; Kirsch, Jeffrey R; Hurn, Patricia D; Murphy, Stephanie J (June 1, 2007). "Inhalational Anesthetics as Neuroprotectants or Chemical Preconditioning Agents in Ischemic Brain". Journal of Cerebral Blood Flow & Metabolism. 27 (6): 1108–1128. doi:10.1038/sj.jcbfm.9600410. ISSN 0271-678X. PMC 2266688. PMID 17047683.
- Offner, Halina; Vandenbark, Arthur A.; Rosenbaum, Jan S.; Kelly, Martin J.; Murphy, Stephanie J.; Subramanian, Sandhya; Elenich, Laura A.; Cody, David B.; Bonhomme, Edna (March 1, 2008). "GPR30 Contributes to Estrogen-Induced Thymic Atrophy". Molecular Endocrinology. 22 (3): 636–648. doi:10.1210/me.2007-0359. ISSN 0888-8809. PMC 2262170. PMID 18063692.
