= Owen Murphy =

Owen Murphy may refer to:

- Owen Murphy (politician) (1827–1895), Canadian politician
- Owen Murphy (songwriter) (1893–1965), American composer, lyricist, writer, and film maker
- Owen Murphy (baseball) (born 2003), American baseball player

== See also ==
- Eoghan Murphy (born 1982), Irish politician
- Eoghan Murphy (hurler) (born 1997), Irish hurler
- Eoin Murphy (disambiguation)
