= Patricia Colleen Murphy =

American poet and teacher

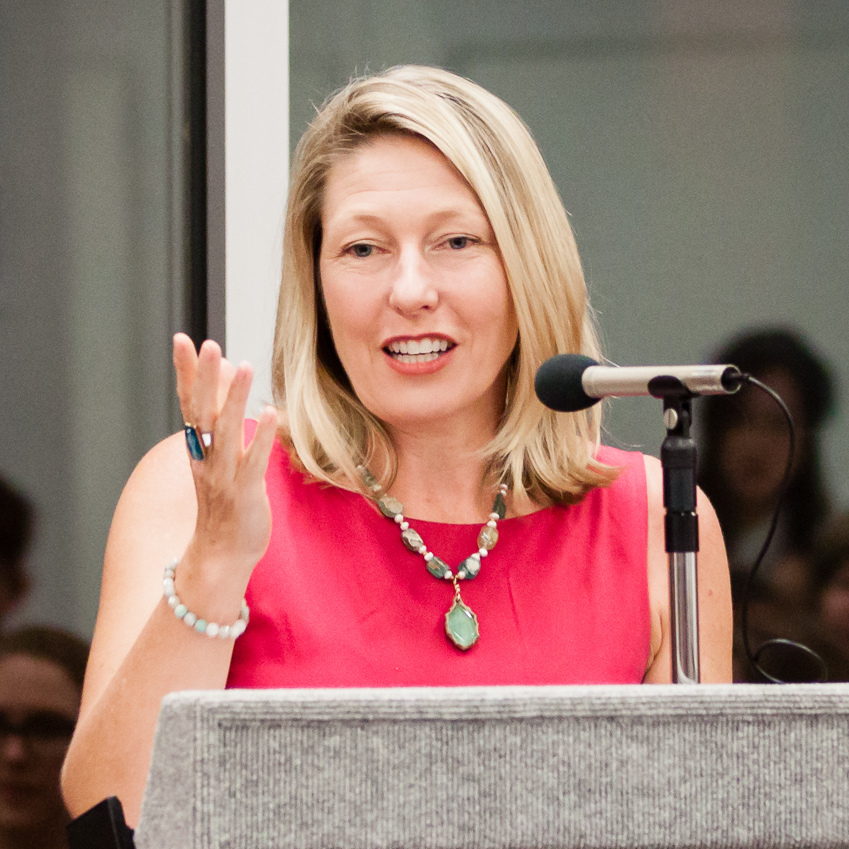
Murphy speaking at Arizona State University in 2016

Patricia Colleen Murphy is an American poet and Professor Emerita. She founded Superstition Review at Arizona State University, where she taught creative writing and magazine production for 31 years. She won the 2019 Press 53 Award for Poetry for her second collection Bully Love. She won the 2016 May Swenson Poetry Award judged by Stephen Dunn, and her poetry collection Hemming Flames was published by University Press of Colorado in summer 2016. Hemming Flames went on to win the 2017 Milt Kessler Award for Poetry. Her work has appeared in many literary journals, including The Iowa Review, Quarterly West, American Poetry Review, North American Review, Northwest Poetry, Third Coast, Black Warrior Review, Natural Bridge and others. Her work has received awards from the Associated Writing Programs and the Academy of American Poets, Gulf Coast, Bellevue Literary Review, The Madison Review, Glimmer Train Press, and The Southern California Review. A chapter of her memoir-in-progress was published as a chapbook by New Orleans Review.
