= Larry Murphy =

Larry Murphy may refer to:

- Larry Murphy (criminal) (born 1966), Irish convicted rapist and suspected serial killer
- Larry Murphy (actor) (born 1972), American voice actor and comedian
- Larry Murphy (baseball) (1857–1911), Canadian former MLB outfielder
- Larry Murphy (ice hockey) (born 1961), Canadian former NHL defenceman
- Larry Murphy (hurler) (born 1972), Irish hurler
- Larry Murphy, a fictional character in the 2016 musical Dear Evan Hansen

== See also ==
- Lawrence Murphy (disambiguation)
