= Ryan Murphy =

Ryan Murphy may refer to:

== Athletes ==
- Ryan Murphy (American football) (born 1992), strong safety for the New York Giants in the National Football League
- Ryan Murphy (footballer) (born 1985), Australian rules footballer
- Ryan Murphy (ice hockey, born 1979), American ice hockey left wing
- Ryan Murphy (ice hockey, born 1983), American ice hockey right wing
- Ryan Murphy (ice hockey, born 1993), Canadian ice hockey defensemen
- Ryan Murphy (swimmer) (born 1995), American gold medalist in the Summer Olympics and world record holder
- Ryan Murphy (baseball) (born 1999), American baseball player

== Others ==
- Ryan Murphy (producer) (born 1965), U.S. television writer and series creator
- Ryan T. Murphy (born 1971), Mormon Tabernacle Choir Associate Director
- Ryan Murphy (Doctors), a character from Doctors
- Ryan Murphy, Lord Mayor of Belfast (2023–2024)

== See also ==
- Ryan Murphey, American musician
