= James Murphy (Irish novelist) =

Irish writer and teacher (1839 – 1921)

- Born: 1839; Glynn, County Carlow, Ireland
- Died: 1 May 1922 (aged 82–83)
- Occupations: writer, poet and teacher

James Murphy (1839 – 1 May 1922) was an Irish writer, poet, and teacher.

== Life ==
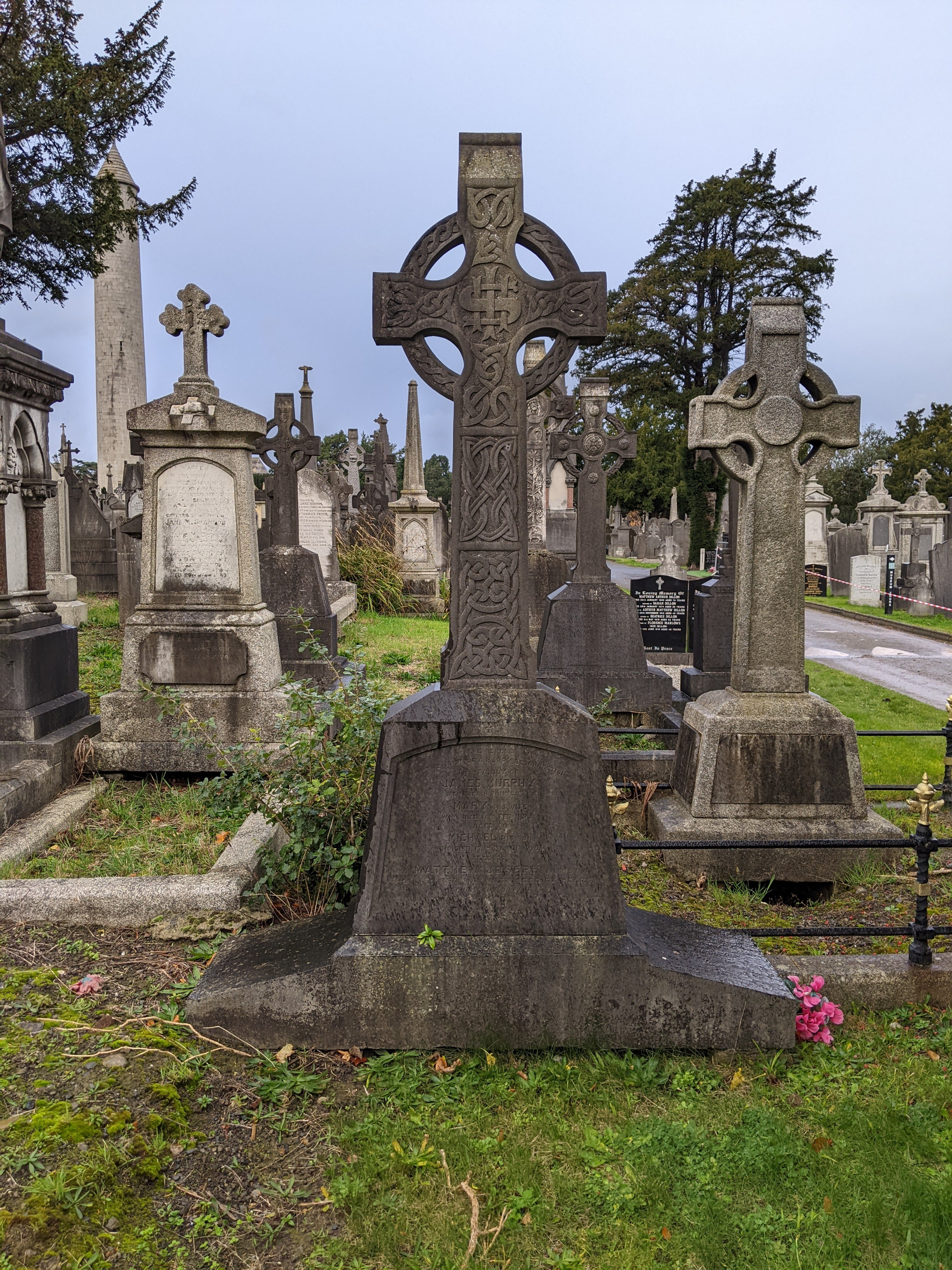
Grave of Murphy in Glasnevin Cemetery, Dublin

James Murphy was born in Glynn, County Carlow in 1839. He was the son of Matthew Murphy. He attended the Training College for Teachers in Marlborough Street, Dublin in 1860. He was appointed principal at the public schools in Bray, becoming a town clerk there. He went on to become professor of maths at St. Gall's, Dublin (later part of the Catholic University). He worked as an inspector for the Intermediate Board of Education in the 1890s. In 1887, Murphy was living in Dublin with family, including 4 sons and 3 daughters. He died on 1 May 1922.

He wrote a number of novels and collections, and in the 1880s was editor of Irish Fireside a literary publication by the Freeman's Journal. His novels were set during key historical moments in Irish history, such as the 1798 Rebellion. He had a number of historical ballads published in periodicals such as The Nation and The Irishman.

== Selected works ==
- Convict No. 25, or the Clearances of Westmeath (1883)
- The Forge of Clohogue (1885)
- The House in the Rath (1886)
- The Fortunes of Maurice O’Donnell (1887)
- Hugh Roach, Ribbonman (1887)
- The Shan Van Vocht (1889)
- The Haunted Church (1889)
- Luke Talbot (1890)
- The Flight from the Cliffs (1911)
- The Inside Passenger (1913)
