= Pat Murphy and JoAnn Persch =

American religious sisters

Pat Murphy

Personal life
- Born: Patricia M. Murphy; April 20, 1929 Chicago, Illinois, U.S.
- Died: July 21, 2025 (aged 96)
- Education: Saint Xavier College

Religious life
- Religion: Christianity
- Denomination: Roman Catholicism
- Institute: Sisters of Mercy

JoAnn Persch

Personal life
- Born: June 27, 1934 Milwaukee, Wisconsin, U.S.
- Died: November 14, 2025 (aged 91)
- Education: Saint Xavier College; Loyola University Chicago

Religious life
- Religion: Christianity
- Denomination: Roman Catholicism
- Institute: Sisters of Mercy

Patricia M. Murphy (April 20, 1929 – July 21, 2025) and JoAnn Persch (June 27, 1934 – November 14, 2025) were American religious sisters in the Roman Catholic Church, belonging to the congregation of the Sisters of Mercy. They were immigration rights activists based in Chicago, Illinois.

== Early lives ==
Patricia Murphy was born on April 20, 1929, in Chicago and grew up in Skokie, Illinois, where she attended a high school run by the Sisters of Mercy. She chose to join the sisters in 1947, with their focus on social justice being particularly important to her. She made her first profession in 1950, where she took the name Sister Mary Nivard. She studied at Saint Xavier College for her bachelor's degree.

JoAnn Persch was born on June 27, 1934, in Milwaukee. She studied home economics at Saint Xavier College, and later earned a master's degree in religious education from Loyola University. She entered the Sisters of Mercy in Des Plaines, Illinois, in 1952, at age 18, and made her perpetual vows in 1958.

== Joint work ==
Murphy and Persch worked closely together from 1960, when the two worked at an elementary school in Fox Point, Wisconsin. In January 1961, Murphy traveled to Sicuani, Peru, as a missionary, but the two remained in touch. Murphy was sent with three other sisters, with the mission of establishing a school and perhaps working in health care. Throughout their mission, the group wrestled with questions regarding the flexibility of the rules of religious life, and how to interact with the community; whether to serve the needs of the people, or to impose a certain lifestyle upon them. These questions occurred in tandem with the changes of Vatican II.

She returned to the United States in 1969, and settled in Chicago, where Persch was teaching. The two moved into an apartment with two other sisters, and began dedicating their time to working with marginalized communities. By the end of the 1960s, Murphy had dropped the name Mary Nivard, returning to her baptismal name of Patricia. Murphy also began studying full-time at Mundelein College.

In the 1980s, the two opened the Su Casa Catholic Worker House on the South Side of Chicago. The house offered shelter to Central American survivors of torture, many of whom later became U.S. citizens. From 1997 to 2002, the pair also worked at Casa Notre Dame, "a shelter for women fleeing domestic violence or recovering from addiction".

Beginning in 2007, Murphy and Persch established the Interfaith Community for Detained Immigrants, leading weekly Friday prayer groups at Illinois's immigrant deportation center in Broadview. After being denied entrance to the center and at the McHenry County Jail in Woodstock, which holds detained immigrants, they worked with the Illinois Coalition for Immigrant and Refugee Rights on a law which would allow religious workers to enter immigrant detention centers. The bill passed successfully in 2010.

With the passage of the bill, Murphy and Persch, among other religious workers, began meeting detained immigrants at the McHenry County Jail weekly. They continued this work for the next 12 years, switching to virtual meetings during the COVID-19 pandemic lockdowns. In 2022, Illinois outlawed immigrant detention in county jails, ending the program.

In February 2018 and July 2019, Murphy was arrested at the U.S. Capitol while protesting for immigration rights and living conditions.

The two criticized U.S. President Donald Trump's stances on immigration, as well as wider U.S. immigration policies. In 2021, they denounced the January 6 insurrection, contrasting it with their history of civil disobedience. In the months before Trump's second term, the two distributed information to immigrant communities in Chicago regarding their rights.

In 2022, Murphy and Persch founded Catherine's Caring Cause, a nonprofit that aimed to serve asylum seekers in the city. By January 2025, they had housed 100 asylum seekers in 17 apartments, with the nonprofit also covering rent, utilities, and groceries for one year.

In December 2023, Murphy and Persch received the 2023 Lifetime Achievement Award from Mother McAuley Liberal Arts High School.

On November 1, 2025, two weeks before her death, Persch attempted to bring the Eucharist to detainees at the Broadview ICE center; she was denied entry. In an October 2025 interview, she described the center's conditions as "very inhumane, very disrespectful".

== Personal lives and deaths ==
Murphy and Persch lived in an apartment in Alsip, Illinois. Murphy died on July 21, 2025, and Persch died November 14, 2025.
