= Gerry Murphy =

Gerry Murphy may refer to:

- Gerry Murphy (poet) (born 1952), Irish poet
- Gerry Murphy (football manager) (1943–2025), Irish caretaker manager of Huddersfield Town F.C.
- Gerry Murphy (rugby union, born 1926) (1926–2014), rugby union player from Northern Ireland
- Gerry Murphy (rugby union coach), Irish rugby union coach
- Gerry Murphy (entrepreneur) (born 1954), Irish entrepreneur, author and activist
- Gerry Murphy (weather forecaster) (born 1969), Irish meteorologist
- Gerry Murphy (businessman) (born 1955), Irish business executive, chairman of Burberry, Tate & Lyle, Tesco, etc

== See also ==
- Jerry Murphy (born 1959), former footballer
- Gerard Murphy (disambiguation)
