= District Attorneys Association of the State of New York =

Professional organization for New York prosecuting attorneys

- Formation: 1909
- Founder: Beecher S. Clother
- Location: New York
- President: Mary Pat Donnelly
- Website: daasny.com

The District Attorneys Association of the State of New York, previously the New York State District Attorneys Association was created in 1909 as a professional organization for prosecuting attorneys (both district attorneys and assistant district attorneys) practicing in New York State.

The membership of the association is all of the elected district attorneys, as well as many assistant district attorneys, from the 62 New York State counties. In 2002, the association reported its total membership to be approximately 1,000.

== History ==
The association's founding was the idea of Beecher S. Clother, the district attorney in Glen Falls (Warren County), New York. At its first meeting in Albany, on September 2, 1909, the association elected William Travers Jerome, of New York County, as president, Clother as vice president, and Rollin B. Sanford, of Albany County, as secretary.

As of 1910 the association had approximately 30 members. Issues it addressed at its annual meetings in 1910 and 1911 included oral bookmaking (the taking of racetrack bets without writing), the need to curb reckless automobile driving, and the proper place of the insanity defense. The association evidently became inactive in the period from 1913 through 1921. It was revived in 1922 at the initiative of New York attorney general Charles D. Newton, who, acting on the suggestion of United States attorney general Harry M. Daugherty, called a meeting of the state's district attorneys that January, in order to discuss legal means to stop profiteering on food and fuel, as well as to foster better law enforcement, in the face of what was perceived as a crime wave afflicting the country.

== Lobbying ==
The association lobbies the New York Legislature on behalf of its members.

The association once resisted change to the Rockefeller drug laws, but came to favor the idea of alternative courts and treatment for addicts and substance abusers, including the Drug Treatment Alternative to Prison or program, first implemented by District Attorney Charles J. Hynes from Kings County, New York. All 62 district attorneys operate drug treatment courts. The association has at times requested that the legislature fund more prosecutors to staff these courts. As of 2009, the association disseminated information on its website about the existing network of drug courts, and how the courts seek justice for addicts through education, intervention and diversion programs, and treatment, in order to reduce recidivism and related criminal conduct.
