= James A. Murphy =

American politician

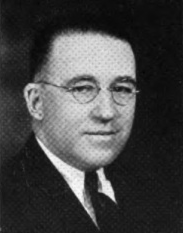
Michigan State Senator James A. Murphy

James A. Murphy (March 31, 1889 Laurium, Michigan – March 19, 1939) of Detroit was a member of the Michigan Senate (1933–1939).
