= Arthur Murphy (Idaho politician) =

American politician and baseball player

Member of the Idaho House of Representatives
- In office 1937–1956

Arthur Powell Murphy (May 18, 1898 - November 7, 1977) was born in Sandpoint, Idaho and lived most of his life in Northern Idaho's Shoshone County in the town of Mullan.

Between 1917 and 1927, he played minor league baseball, as a first baseman with the Oakland Oaks and Victoria Bees. He also played for the barnstorming team, House of David. In 1927, Arthur was a manager for the Odgen Gunners in the Utah–Idaho League.

In 1937 Murphy entered politics. He served in the Idaho State House of Representatives as a Democrat from 1937 to 1956. Then in the Idaho State Senate from 1957 until his death.

On November 7, 1977, Arthur died in a Spokane, Washington hospital after a battle with cancer.
