= Belladonna =

Belladonna or Bella Donna may refer to:

== Plants ==
- Atropa bella-donna, or deadly nightshade
- Amaryllis belladonna, also known as the belladonna lily, a flowering plant

== Literature ==
- Bella Donna (novel), a 1909 novel by Robert Hichens
- Belladonna (novel), a 2008 fantasy novel by Anne Bishop
- Belladonna Series, a small press non-profit publisher

== Film and theatre ==
- Bella Donna, a 1912 play by J. B. Fagan based on the Hichens novel
- Bella Donna (1915 film), based on the play by J. B. Fagan
- Bella Donna (1923 film), a remake of the 1915 film
- Bella Donna (1934 film), a British film directed by Robert Milton, based on the play by J. B. Fagan
- Bella Donna (1983 film), a West German film
- Belladonna (2015 film), a Croatian drama film
- Belladonna of Sadness, a 1973 film, also known as Belladonna

== Music ==
- Belladonna (band), from Italy

=== Albums ===
- Bella Donna (album), by Stevie Nicks, 1981
- Belladonna (album), by Daniel Lanois, 2005
- Belladonna, by Ian Carr, 1972

=== Songs ===
- "Bella Donna", by Beast in Black from the 2021 album Dark Connection
- "Bella Donna", by The Avett Brothers from the 2008 EP The Second Gleam
- "Bella Donna", by Kosheen from the 2012 album Independence
- "Bella Donna", by Stevie Nicks from the album of the same name
- "Bella Donna (Beautiful Lady)", written by Harry B. Smith and associated with the 1923 silent film Bella Donna
- "Belladonna", by Fitz and the Tantrums from the 2019 album All the Feels
- "Belladonna", by John Cooper Clarke from the 1980 album Snap, Crackle & Bop
- "Belladonna", by the Legendary Pink Dots from the 1991 album The Maria Dimension
- "Belladonna", by Madrugada from the 1999 album Industrial Silence
- "Belladonna", by Siouxsie and the Banshees from the 1984 album Hyæna
- "Belladonna", by UFO from the 1976 album No Heavy Petting
- "Belladonna", by Andreas Vollenweider from the 1983 album Caverna Magica
- "Bella, Bella Donna", a single by René Carol, 1953
- "Belladonna", by Ra Ra Riot from the 2019 album Superbloom
- “Belladonna”, by Ava Max from the 2020 album Heaven & Hell

== People ==
- Belladonna (actress) (born 1981), American pornographic actress

=== Surname ===
- Giorgio Belladonna (1923–1995), bridge player
- Joey Belladonna (born 1960), vocalist for the band Anthrax and his solo project Belladonna

=== Characters ===
- Bella Donna (character), a comic book character associated with the X-Men
- Bella Donna, a lioness in "The Hunting Ground", an episode of Kimba the White Lion
- Belladonna, a demonic canine in All Dogs Go to Heaven: The Series and An All Dogs Christmas Carol
- Blake Belladonna, a character in the web series RWBY
