= Temptation (1946 film) =

1946 American drama film noir directed by Irving Pichel

- Theatrical release poster
- Directed by: Irving Pichel
- Screenplay by: Robert Thoeren
- Based on: Novel: Bella Donna by Robert Smythe Hichens Play: Bella Donna by James B. Fagan
- Produced by: Edward Small
- Starring: Merle Oberon; George Brent; Charles Korvin; Paul Lukas
- Cinematography: Lucien Ballard
- Edited by: Ernest J. Nims
- Music by: Daniele Amfitheatrof
- Color process: Black and white
- Production company: International Pictures
- Distributed by: Universal Pictures
- Release date: December 2, 1946
- Running time: 98 minutes
- Country: United States
- Language: English
- Budget: $1.6 million

Temptation is a 1946 American film noir thriller film directed by Irving Pichel and starring Merle Oberon, George Brent, Charles Korvin and Paul Lukas. The film was based on Robert Smythe Hichens's 1909 novel Bella Donna. Other film adaptations of the novel were produced in 1915, 1923 and 1934.

== Plot ==
In 1890s London, a disreputable divorcée snares a loving but naive Egyptologist, marries him and moves to Egypt. She quickly becomes bored and embarks on an affair with Mamhoud Baroudi. She falls in love with him, and they plot to kill her husband.

== Cast ==
- Merle Oberon as Ruby
- George Brent as Nigel Armine
- Charles Korvin as Mahoud Baroudi
- Paul Lukas as Sir Meyer Isaacson
- Lenore Ulric as Marie
- Arnold Moss as Ahmed Effendi
- Robert Capa as Hamza
- Aubrey Mather as Dr. Harding
- Ludwig Stössel as Dr. Mueller
- André Charlot as Prof. Dupont
- Suzanne Cloutier as Yvonne Dupont
- Gloria Lloyd as Jean McCormick

== Production ==
The film was the first that Edward Small produced after the termination of his long contract with United Artists, and the first to be filmed at Universal under the merger with International Pictures that formed the short-lived United World Pictures. Small bought the rights to the novel in 1941, intending it as a vehicle for Ilona Massey, who had just appeared in International Lady for him. He wished to produce the film for United Artists, but other projects took priority. Over a five-year period, there were several near-starts and postponements. Small almost managed to begin production in February 1946, but there was not enough studio space.

Photographer Robert Capa made his sole acting appearance in Temptation. On a visit to the set to see his friend Charles Korvin, Capa claimed that he could perform the role of Hamza better than could the actor who had been hired to play the part. Capa auditioned for Irving Pichel, who was convinced by Capa's accent and offered him the part.

== Reception ==
In a contemporary review for The New York Times, critic Bosley Crowther panned the film, writing: "True enough, Miss Oberon looks lovely, Mr. Korvin behaves with bold sang-froid and George Brent is sufficiently unimpressive to seem a husband that a dame would double-cross. Paul Lucas, Arnold Moss and Lenore Ulric also act as though they thought they had a script. But the whole thing is as claptrap in its nature as it was when Pola Negri played it back in 1923."

Variety criticized the screenplay, writing: "Production is well-stacked with solid values in every department except for the screenplay, which falls short in its attempt to stretch an unsubstantial story line over so long a running time."
