= Bella Donna (1934 film) =

1934 British film by Robert Milton

- Directed by: Robert Milton
- Written by: Vera Allinson; James B. Fagan (play); H. Fowler Mear
- Based on: Bella Donna by Robert Hichens
- Produced by: Julius Hagen
- Starring: Conrad Veidt; Mary Ellis; Cedric Hardwicke
- Cinematography: Sydney Blythe; William Luff
- Edited by: Jack Harris
- Music by: William Trytel
- Production company: Julius Hagen Productions
- Distributed by: Gaumont British Distributors
- Release date: August 1934
- Running time: 91 minutes
- Country: United Kingdom
- Language: English

Bella Donna is a 1934 British drama film directed by Robert Milton and starring Conrad Veidt, Mary Ellis and Cedric Hardwicke. It was written by Vera Allinson and H. Fowler Mear based on the 1911 play by James B. Fagan, itself based on the 1909 novel Bella Donna by Robert Hichens, which had previously been made into a 1923 American silent film Bella Donna starring Pola Negri. A further American adaptation Temptation starring Merle Oberon was produced in 1946.

The film's art direction was by James A. Carter. It was made at Twickenham Studios.

== Plot ==
Mona Chepstow, a devious Society woman also known as Bella Donna, marries young engineer Nigel Armine, much to the disapproval of Nigel's friends, in particular Harley Street specialist Dr. Meyer Isaacson. Nigel takes Mona to Egypt, where she meets and falls undet the influence of wealthy philanderer Mahmoud Baroudi, who persuades her to poison Nigel, but Isaacson arrives just in time to save him. Mona loses everything, and is banished from Society circles.

== Cast ==
- Mary Ellis as Mona Chepstow / Bella Donna
- John Stuart as Nigel Armine
- Cedric Hardwicke as Dr. Meyer Isaacson
- Conrad Veidt as Mahmoud Baroudi
- Jeanne Stuart as Lady Zoe Harwich
- Rodney Millington as Ibrahim Achmed
- Eve South as the dancing girl
- Michael Shepley as Dr. Baring-Hartley

== Reception ==
Kine Weekly wrote: "The story is not too direct in its development, but the salient points in its drama nevertheless register with telling effect and colourful atmosphere is promoted. Mary Ellis contributes a vital and convincing performance in the name part, and receives strong support from Cedric Hardwicke and Conrad Veidt."

The Daily Film Renter wrote: "Picturesque settings include native café, desert camp and Nile boat. Strong climax depicts Bella Donna's downfall and banishment. Mary Ellis makes promising debut in lead, Conrad Veidt and Sir Cedric Hardwicke filling principal male roles with skill. Safe general booking on star and title values."

Variety wrote: "Miss Ellis' performance breathes modernity, but this is desirable in so old-fashioned a melodrama. Fact that she scores strongly is a compliment to her artistry. Cedric Hardwicke walks through the role of Dr. Isaacson with majestic dignity, but it is Conrad Veidt who runs away with the picture as Baroudi, the Egyptian. Picturegoers will love his Machiavellian caveman stuff. ... Rather an artistic effort throughout, despite considerable harshness in the cutting. Picture should meet with success in all countries. Its appeal is universal."

== See also ==
- Bella Donna (1915)
- Bella Donna (1923)
- Temptation (1946)
