= Maude Mayberg =

American entrepreneur

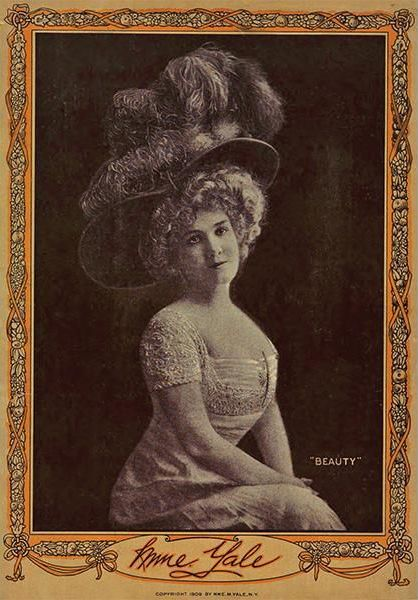
Madame Yale

Maude Mayberg (born c. 1852), also known as Madame Yale, was a beauty products and patent medicine entrepreneur and saleswoman.

== Career ==
Mayberg said that around 1890 at age 38, she had found an elixir she called Fruitcura which had transformed her from illness to health after physicians had given up helping her. She said the miraculous cure inspired her to share Fruitcura with her "sisters in misery." By 1890 she started calling herself Madame Yale. Stories of women who weren't helped by physicians were central to her sales pitch.

As Madame Yale she "preached her 'Religion of Beauty'" starting in 1892 through a series of "Beauty Talks" in which she discussed beautiful women in history, including Helen of Troy and Diana, and sold lotions and beauty potions that she said had transformed her from a "sallow, fat, exhausted woman" into one of the beauties of the day. Her products included "Skin Food," "Elixir of Beauty," "Blush of Youth," "Blood Tonic," "Complexion Bleach," "Yale's Magic Secret," and "Fruitcura," which was the product she was most known for. She also sold soaps, cosmetics, corsets, and a "facial-steaming machine."

At the time, the wearing of cosmetics was looked upon as a "questionable moral choice," and Yale claimed her concoctions would "transform women from the inside out, rather than helping them hide their imperfections by wearing makeup. Yale argued that "Training and skills being equal, the woman who looks better will get the job, so why not make the most of your appearance?"

Smithsonian estimated the worth of her business in the 1890s to be US$500,000, equivalent to $15 million in 2020.

== Publications ==
- Madame Yale's system of physical and beauty culture (1909)
- The Science of Health and Beauty (1890s)
- How to cultivate the complexion: a practical treatise on the care of the skin (1890)

== Pure Food and Drug Act ==
In 1906, the US congress passed the Pure Food and Drug Act, and in 1908 the US government sued Yale for "misbranding of drug preparations." The government seized inventory and issued a report that Fruitcura contained 16.66% alcohol. She was fined and barred from distributing seven of her top-selling products, including Fruitcura. In 1910 the Medico-pharmaceutical Critic and Guide said "Madame Yale's marvelous preparations have been declared marvelous humbugs."

== Legacy ==
In 1904 the Boston Evening Transcript called her a "famous expert on beauty culture. Smithsonian in 2020 called her a "true pioneer" in what would later be termed the "wellness space." Emmeline Clein wrote in Smithsonian that she "dropped into obscurity" after two decades of fame and may have resumed using Mayberg.

== See also ==
- Snake oil
