= Code Name Puritan =

2024 non-fiction book

Code Name Puritan: Norman Holmes Pearson at the Nexus of Poetry, Espionage, and American Power
- Author: Greg Barnhisel
- Publisher: University of Chicago Press
- Publication date: 2024
- ISBN: 9780226647340 ebook
- OCLC: 1420623541

Code Name Puritan: Norman Holmes Pearson at the Nexus of Poetry, Espionage, and American Power is a biography of Norman Holmes Pearson by Greg Barnhisel. It was published in 2024 by the University of Chicago Press.

== General references ==
- Norman, Max (2024-10-04). "'Code Name Puritan' Review: Ivy and Espionage". The Wall Street Journal.
- Holzman, Michael. "Double agents". The Times Literary Supplement.
- Thurston, Michael (2025). "Review of Code Name Puritan: Norman Holmes Pearson at the Nexus of Poetry, Espionage, and American Power, by Greg Barnhisel". American Literary History. 37 (2): 577–580 – via Project MUSE.
