= James R. Murphy =

American lawyer and counterintelligence officer

Chief of Counterintelligence at the Office of Strategic Services (X-2 unit)
- In office 1943–1946
- Preceded by: Position established
- Succeeded by: Position deestablished

Chief of X-2 Counterintelligence Branch
- In office June 15, 1943 – September 20, 1945
- Preceded by: George Hunter White
- Succeeded by: Position deestablished

Executive Assistant to the Chief of Information and Strategic Services
- In office 1941–1943
- Appointed by: William J. Donovan
- Preceded by: Position established

Personal details
- Born: January 8, 1904
- Died: October 9, 1986 (aged 82) Arlington, Virginia
- Spouse: Doris H. Murphy
- Children: Jean M. Howard
- Education: George Washington University Law School
- Awards: Intelligence Medal of Merit; Medal of Freedom; Croix de Guerre; Legion of Honour
- Codenames: SAINT; 120

James Russell "Jimmy" Murphy was an American attorney, soldier, and intelligence officer who served as the chief of the X-2 Counterintelligence Branch of the Office of Strategic Services (OSS) during World War II. From 1943 to 1946, held the position of chief of counterintelligence at both the OSS, and later at the Strategic Services Unit (SSU). Though primarily stationed in Washington, D.C., during the war, he made frequent trips to the European and African Theatres, including London and Morocco.

Murphy played a critical role in wartime counterintelligence efforts, reportedly helping to identify approximately 3,000 foreign agents, many of whom were turned into double agents used to transmit misleading information to Axis powers. He also contributed to the development of effective, non-coercive interrogation methods that aided military intelligence gathering. He would also regularly visit his X-2 agents on the front line in order to offer moral support and provide courage.

William Donovan wrote:

"A firm agreement with the British was made in March and April 1943, and carried out on a basis of loyal cooperation and full interchange of pertinent information throughout the war. Mr. Murphy was not, however, content to remain in tutelage of the old established foreign agencies. His constant aim was to develop American counter-espionage to the point of being an equal partner with its allies."

== Early life and early law career ==
James Russell Murphy was born in Piedmont, Missouri, in 1904. He moved to Washington, D.C., in the 1920s after winning a national typewriting competition, which awarded him a federal government job. He began his career as a typist and during this time became acquainted with William J. "Wild Bill" Donovan, the decorated Medal of Honor winner and World War I veteran. While working in Donovan's law office at the United States Department of Justice, Murphy became one of Donovan's main protégés, learning all he could from the senior lawyer while practicing for entry into law school.

While employed in Washington, Murphy enrolled in George Washington University Law School, attending classes at night. He earned his law degree in 1931 and subsequently practiced law privately in the city for the following decade.

== Office of Strategic Services and X-2 ==
In 1941, Murphy joined Wild Bill Donovan in establishing the Office of the Coordinator of Information (COI), the precursor to the Office of Strategic Services (OSS). As a talented typist, he was indespensable to Donovan, and afterwards Murphy served briefly as the executive assistant to Donovan.

Murphy and Donovan were close friends, trusted confidants, and especially drinking buddies. At one point during his tenure as director of the OSS, Donovan frustrated by ongoing inter-agency conflicts, prepared a resignation letter. He entrusted the letter to Murphy, instructing him to deliver it to the White House the following morning. However, by the next day, Donovan had reconsidered. When he asked Murphy if he still had the letter, Murphy quietly retrieved it from his coat pocket and returned it without comment.

On March 1, 1943, Murphy was appointed Chief of this newly established counterintelligence apparatus of the OSS, which was initially called CI, but to distinguish it from the counterintelligence efforts of other intelligence agencies, it was called X-2, created primarily in order to coordinate with the British regarding Ultra and their program at deciphering the Enigma machine. He took over the direction of the organization's counterintelligence efforts from George Hunter White, who was subsequently sent on a secret mission to Calcutta, India to investigate Japanese threats to allied naval ports in the area.

As the leader of OSS’s X-2, Murphy advocated for using other official organizations to provide operational cover. He became aware of the extensive Soviet counterintelligence apparatus that had compromised German intelligence efforts during the war, and pushed for improvements in American counterintelligence practices.

He is perhaps most noted for recruiting several prominent figures in American intelligence history, including James Angleton and Norman Pearson. Both men were part of a close-knit circle that frequently gathered at his father-in-law's farm on Glebe Road in Arlington, Virginia, where his daughter occasionally babysat for them. Murphy also recruited Jane Burrell, an officer in the OSS's X-2 counterintelligence branch, who became the first CIA officer to die in the line of duty when her plane crashed in 1948. Known for selecting personnel outside the traditional OSS mold, he stressed the importance of recruiting a more diverse range of talent and improving source validation procedures.

He also played a significant mentoring role in the career of James Angleton, who would later lead the CIA’s Counterintelligence Division. According to some accounts, Murphy acted as a "father figure" to Angleton and influenced his later adoption of rigorous compartmentalization, unorthodox recruitment strategies, and a "cautious" approach to internal security. Murphy demonstrated a keen ability to identify promising recruits, particularly those with proficiency in Western European languages. He also showed a preference for hiring women, who were believed to possess the meticulousness essential for counterintelligence work.

According to personnel records, Murphy earned an annual salary of $8,000 during his government service—a figure below what a practicing attorney could typically expect in the private sector at the time.

Murphy was also tasked with overseeing deception operations in advance of the D-Day landings, contributing to efforts designed to mislead Axis forces about the actual location of the Allied invasion, diverting attention away from the Normandy beaches. Later in the war, he assumed responsibility for locating and recovering cultural property and artworks that had been looted by Nazi forces during their occupation of Europe.

== Later life and death ==
After the war, Murphy was unceremoniously fired from the SSU after he leaked a story to the journalist Stewart Alsop, which, according to the State Department, was after Murphy had become disgruntled about plans to consolidate the SSU into the newly created Central Intelligence Group (CIG).

Murphy practiced law for the rest of his life. At the time of his death, he was a partner at the law firm of Cross, Murphy, Smuck and Houston. He died of cardiac arrest on October 9, 1986 at Northern Virginia Doctors' Hospital.
