= International Pictures =

American film production company

- International Pictures logo in the opening screen credits of Tomorrow Is Forever.
- Type: Private
- Industry: Film industry
- Founded: 1943; 83 years ago in Hollywood, California, United States
- Founders: Leo Spitz; William Goetz
- Defunct: July 30, 1946; 80 years ago
- Successor: Company: Universal-International Pictures; Library: Amazon MGM Studios (through United Artists) (excluding The Dark Mirror, owned by Skydance Corporation via Melange Pictures and Temptation, retained by Universal Pictures)
- Products: Motion pictures

International Pictures was an American film production company that existed in the 1940s. It merged with Universal Pictures to become Universal-International on October 1, 1946.

== History ==
The company was formed in 1944. It was headed up by Leo Spitz, an executive at RKO, and William Goetz, vice president in charge for production 20th Century Fox.

In October 1943, Goetz announced International would start off making four films with an overall budget of $4.2 million, the films including Belle of the Yukon, The Woman in the Window and Casanova Brown.

In January 1944, International signed an agreement with RKO Pictures to provide four films for distribution.

Following the merger, Spitz and Goetz became head of production at Universal-International.

The library was up for sale in 1952. NBC first offered the package, but declined. Moulin Productions acquired the International film library in 1953, sell the theatrical distribution rights to Independent Releasing Corporation, and later transferred to United Artists, after the merger with Universal. The Dark Mirror was sold separately, first to a loan to Bank of America, later licensed to General Teleradio, and eventually at National Telefilm Associates. Only a single International film, Temptation was retained by Universal, and eventually included in Universal's TV packages by Screen Gems in the 1950s for a brief period of time.

== Filmography ==
Release date	Title	Distributor
August 23, 1944	Casanova Brown	RKO Radio Pictures
November 3, 1944	The Woman in the Window	RKO Radio Pictures
December 27, 1944	Belle of the Yukon	RKO Radio Pictures
March 3, 1945	It's a Pleasure	RKO Radio Pictures
June 20, 1945	Along Came Jones	RKO Radio Pictures
February 20, 1946	Tomorrow Is Forever	RKO Radio Pictures
July 2, 1946	The Stranger	RKO Radio Pictures
October 18, 1946	The Dark Mirror	Universal Pictures
December 2, 1946	Temptation	Universal Pictures
