= The Improper Duchess =

- Trade advertisement
- Directed by: Harry Hughes
- Written by: James B. Fagan (play); Vernon Harris; Harry Hughes
- Produced by: Maurice Browne
- Starring: Yvonne Arnaud; Hugh Wakefield; Wilfrid Caithness
- Cinematography: Ronald Neame
- Edited by: Ted Richards
- Music by: Eric Spear
- Production company: City Film Corporation
- Distributed by: General Film Distributors
- Release date: 17 January 1936
- Running time: 80 minutes
- Country: United Kingdom
- Language: English

The Improper Duchess is a 1936 British comedy film directed by Harry Hughes and starring Yvonne Arnaud, Hugh Wakefield and Wilfrid Caithness. It was written by Vernon Harris and Hughes based on the 1931 play of the same name by J. B. Fagan in which Arnaud had starred.

It was shot at Elstree Studios with sets designed by the art director David Rawnsley. It was made by the independent City Film Corporation, and released by the newly established General Film Distributors.

== Plot ==
The King of Poldavia travels to Washington with his girlfriend the Duchess of Tann, to arrange an oil deal. Senator Corcaran, who is against the deal, and his friend the Reverend Adam MacAdam, accuse their guests of moral depravity, and order them to leave. When the Duchess uses her charms on their opponents, the deal is approved.

== Cast ==
- Yvonne Arnaud as Duchess of Tann
- Hugh Wakefield as King of Poldavia
- Wilfrid Caithness as Reverend Adam McAdam
- Arthur Finn as Senator Corcoran
- Gerald Barry as Baron Kamp
- Finlay Currie as Milton Lee
- James Carew as Montgomery Curtis
- Annie Esmond as Baroness Kamp
- Felix Aylmer as Count Seidel
- Honorine Catto as Miss Cutting
- Andreas Malandrinos as Garcia
- Davis Smith-Dorrien as Captain Olven
- Cynthia Stock as Gunning
- Ben Welden as Macabe

== Reception ==
The Monthly Film Bulletin wrote: "The director has some difficult material to cope with, for the interest is carried almost entirely in the dialogue and the action moves very little. Yvonne Arnaud brings fire and life to the screen, but the rest are never more than competent. The dialogue has its bright passages, and the story is, in parts, neatly contrived."

Kine Weekly wrote: "Handicapped by an excess of verbiage the plot seldom enters the realms of piquancy, nor does it rise to hilarious heights, but thanks to a clever and provocalive performance by Yvonne Arnaud it manages to provide entertainment slightly in excess of its story values. Nothing else matters but the star, and possibly the title."

The Daily Film Renter wrote: "Adaptation of noted West End stage play, with Yvonne Arnaud giving polished portrayal in original role of sprightly Duchess who manoeuvres big oil deal for Ruritanian monarch by use of feminine wiles. Developed on lines of dialogue, with feminine star tower of strength in part 'made to measure' for her particular style, subject deftly skates over thin ice and represents piquant entertainment for the more discriminating patron."
