= The Woman in the Window (1944 film) =

1944 film by Fritz Lang

- Theatrical release poster
- Directed by: Fritz Lang
- Screenplay by: Nunnally Johnson
- Based on: Once Off Guard; 1942 novel by J. H. Wallis
- Produced by: Nunnally Johnson
- Starring: Edward G. Robinson; Joan Bennett
- Cinematography: Milton R. Krasner
- Edited by: Gene Fowler Jr. Marjorie Fowler
- Music by: Arthur Lange
- Production company: International Pictures
- Distributed by: RKO Pictures
- Release date: November 3, 1944 (United States)
- Running time: 99 minutes
- Country: United States
- Language: English

The Woman in the Window is a 1944 American film noir directed by Fritz Lang and starring Edward G. Robinson and Joan Bennett, with Raymond Massey, Edmund Breon, and Dan Duryea in supporting roles. It tells the story of a middle-aged psychology professor who kills in self-defense the lover of a young femme fatale he just met while his family is on vacation.

The film is based on J. H. Wallis' 1942 novel Once Off Guard. Screenwriter Nunnally Johnson, having written the script for The Grapes of Wrath (1940), was invited by International Pictures to a picture deal, and The Woman in the Window was chosen as its premiere project.

The term "film noir" originated as a genre description in part because of The Woman in the Window. In 1970, Joan Bennett said that everybody considered The Woman in the Window her best film.

== Plot ==
Middle aged assistant college psychology professor Richard Wanley sends his wife and two children off on vacation. He then heads to his club to meet friends. On the way in, Wanley sees a striking portrait of an alluring dark-haired woman in a next-door gallery window. He and his friends jest ruefully about the painting and its beautiful young subject. Wanley stays at the club and dozes off reading Song of Songs.

When he leaves, Wanley stops at the portrait. While regarding it, he sees the woman who posed for it as a reflection in the glass. She explains she sometimes comes there to watch people's reaction to it. She convinces Wanley to join her for a drink.

Afterwards, they go to her home to look at some sketches. An unexpected visit from her sugar daddy interrupts them. Known to her only as Frank Howard, he picks a fight with Wanley and is killed in self-defense. The woman reveals her name: Alice Reed. Wanley and Alice conspire to cover up the death, and Wanley disposes of the man's body in the country. However, he shows his face to several people, and leaves many clues.

One of Wanley's friends at the club, district attorney Frank Lalor, learns of the police investigation, and invites Wanley along to visit the crime scene. On several occasions, Wanley slips and says things suggesting he knows more about the crime than he should, but Lalor brushes them off.

As the police probe deepens, Alice is blackmailed by a wanted ex-cop, Heidt, who had been hired as a bodyguard for Mazard. Wanley and Alice discuss the problem, and he concludes that the best way to deal with an extortionist is to kill him. Wanley gives her a prescription medication to use.

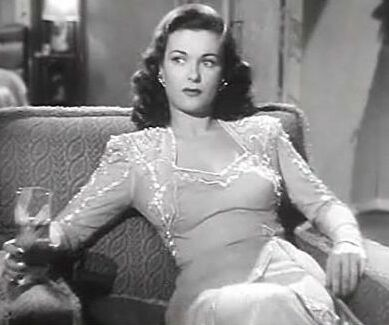
Joan Bennett as Alice Reed, "the woman in the window".

When Heidt arrives to collect his grift, he becomes suspicious when Alice insists he drink his cocktail. Recognizing it was poisoned, he angrily takes the money, and grabs a pocket watch which belonged to her suitor, in reality an ill-tempered business tycoon named Claude Mazard. Heidt leaves, and Alice calls Wanley, confessing her failure. Recognizing his hopelessness, he takes the rest of the powders.

Shortly after, Heidt is killed in a shootout near the Alice's home. Finding $5,000 in cash and Mazard's watch, police conclude he was the murderer. Hearing this, Alice races home to call an unresponsive Wanley, who slumps over in a stupor and dies.

In a match cut, Wanley is awakened in his chair at his club, and realizes that the entire ordeal had been a dream. He steps out on the street, and curiosity draws him to the painting. An attractive woman reeking of misadventure appears and asks him to light her cigarette. He adamantly refuses and runs down the street.

== Cast ==
- Edward G. Robinson as Professor Richard Wanley
- Joan Bennett as Alice Reed
- Raymond Massey as District Attorney Frank Lalor
- Edmund Breon as Dr. Michael Barkstane
- Dan Duryea as Heidt/Ted, the Doorman
- Thomas E. Jackson as Inspector Jackson, Homicide Bureau
- Dorothy Peterson as Mrs. Wanley
- Arthur Loft as Claude Mazard/Frank Howard/Charlie the Hat-Check Man
- Iris Adrian as Streetwalker

== Production ==
The film was originally titled Once Off Guard. In May 1944, William Goetz changed the title to The Woman in the Window.

=== Casting ===
By late September 1943, Edward G. Robinson had already been cast and Johnson and Lang wanted to borrow Ida Lupino for the leading female role. In October, Johnson's choice for the leading lady was Tallulah Bankhead. In March 1944, Merle Oberon was signed for the role. In late March, Oberon wanted to return to London with her husband, Alexander Korda, but he advised her to stay in the United States and make the film. That same month, Oberon returned to England and Joan Bennett replaced her. Bennett also accepted Oberon's role in Nob Hill. She told Louella Parsons, "It looks as if I am inheriting all Merle Oberon's cast offs. First, The Woman in the Window, and now Nob Hill."

According to Lang, all the male roles in the script were written for "old men". Dan Duryea had appeared in Lang's previous film, Ministry of Fear (1944), and Lang convinced the studio to cast Duryea as the blackmailer. Lang did this to "introduce someone relatively youthful into the male cast."

In April 1944, Dorothy Peterson joined the cast.

=== Filming ===
In his autobiography, Edward G. Robinson remembered, "For R.K.O. I made a picture called Woman in the Window with Joan Bennett and Raymond Massey, directed by Fritz Lang, one of the greats in his declining period."

This was the first film Joan Bennett made after giving birth to her third daughter, Stephanie Wanger. It was also her second collaboration with director Fritz Lang after Man Hunt (1941). She later wrote, "Then it was back to work and a steady round of moviemaking. The next most significant film I made was again directed by Fritz Lang: Woman in the Window with Edward G. Robinson. Its success equaled that of Man Hunt, and ours seemed a most fortuitous working relationship." Bennett included The Woman in the Window among the "scant half-dozen of [her] own total of seventy films" that were "acceptable" to her.

As in Scarlet Street directed the following year by Lang, Robinson plays a lonely middle-aged man opposite Bennett as a model and Duryea as the villain. The two films also share Milton R. Krasner as cinematographer and several supporting actors.

Lang managed to convince the studio to discard the film's original tragic ending. He thought Wanley's suicide would be anti-climactic because the story was "not so heavy and serious that you can afford to have three deaths". He turned the story into a dream and had Arthur Loft (Alice's boyfriend) and Dan Duryea (the blackmailer) reappear as the hat-check man and the porter, respectively. Lang later attributed the film's success to "the feeling of relief engendered in the audience by the revelation that it was all a dream".

Fritz Lang said that the "hardest [shot] to film" was the one where Wanley is dying at his home but then wakes up at the club. The close-up was done in 20 seconds without cutting. Robinson wore a tear-away suit with his original club suit underneath; an assistant positioned under the camera removed the first suit during the close-up. The crew changed the set behind him to complete the return to his club while Robinson remained in the chair.

== Reception ==
=== Critical response ===
In a contemporary review, the staff at Variety magazine was enthusiastic, writing: "Nunnally Johnson whips up a strong and decidedly suspenseful murder melodrama in Woman in the Window. The producer, who also prepared the screenplay (from the novel Once off Guard by J.H. Wallis), continually punches across the suspense for constant and maximum audience reaction. Added are especially fine timing in the direction by Fritz Lang and outstanding performances by Edward G. Robinson, Joan Bennett, Raymond Massey and Dan Duryea."

The film holds a 88% rating on Rotten Tomatoes as of May 2022. In August 2015, the online entertainment magazine Paste named the film the best film noir of all time.

== Accolades ==
At the 18th Academy Awards, The Woman in the Window was nominated for Best Scoring of a Dramatic or Comedy Picture for Hugo Friedhofer and Arthur Lange. However, Miklós Rózsa won the award for Spellbound (1945).
