= The Improper Duchess (play) =

- Original language: English
- Written by: James Fagan
- Genre: Comedy

Premiere
- Date: 13 January 1931
- Place: Empire Theatre, Southampton

The Improper Duchess is a 1931 comedy play by the Irish-born writer James Fagan.

It premiered at the Empire Theatre in Southampton before transferring to the Globe Theatre in London's West End where it ran for 348 performances between 22 January and 21 November 1931. It starred Yvonne Arnaud in the title role. The cast also included Frank Cellier, Hartley Power, John Laurie, Annie Esmond and Julie Suedo.

== Film adaptation ==
In 1936 the play was made into a film The Improper Duchess with Arnaud reprising her role.

== Bibliography ==
- Wearing, J.P. The London Stage 1930-1939: A Calendar of Productions, Performers, and Personnel. Rowman & Littlefield, 2014.
