= Snake oil =

Euphemism for false advertising

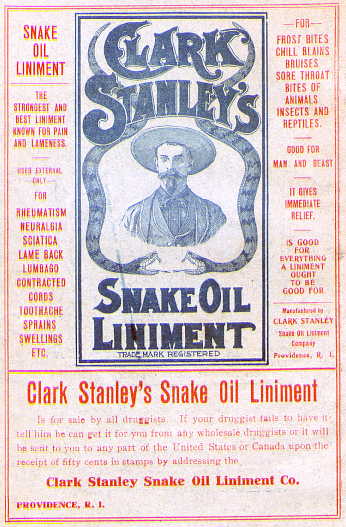
Clark Stanley's Snake Oil

"Snake oil" is a term used to describe deceptive marketing, health care fraud, or a scam. Similarly, snake oil salesman is a common label used to describe someone who sells, promotes, or is a general proponent of some valueless or fraudulent cure, remedy, or solution. The term comes from the "snake oil" that was sold as a cure-all elixir for many kinds of physiological problems. Many 18th-century European and 19th-century United States entrepreneurs advertised and sold mineral oil (often mixed with various active and inactive household herbs, spices, drugs, and compounds, but containing no snake-derived substances whatsoever) as "snake oil liniment", making claims about its efficacy as a panacea. Patent medicines that claimed to be panaceas were extremely common from the 18th century until the 20th century, particularly among vendors masking addictive drugs such as cocaine, amphetamine, alcohol, and opium-based concoctions or elixirs, to be sold at medicine shows as medication or products promoting health.

== History ==
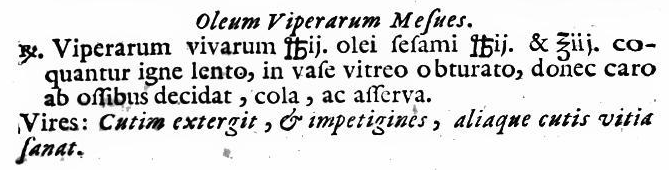
A snake oil recipe from 1719/1751 (Juan de Loeches, Tyrocinium Pharmaceticum), printed in Spain

Patent medicines originated in England, where a patent was granted to Richard Stoughton's elixir in 1712. There were no federal regulations in the United States concerning the safety and effectiveness of drugs until the 1906 Pure Food and Drug Act. Thus, the widespread marketing and availability of dubiously advertised patent medicines without known properties or origin persisted in the US for a much greater number of years than in Europe.

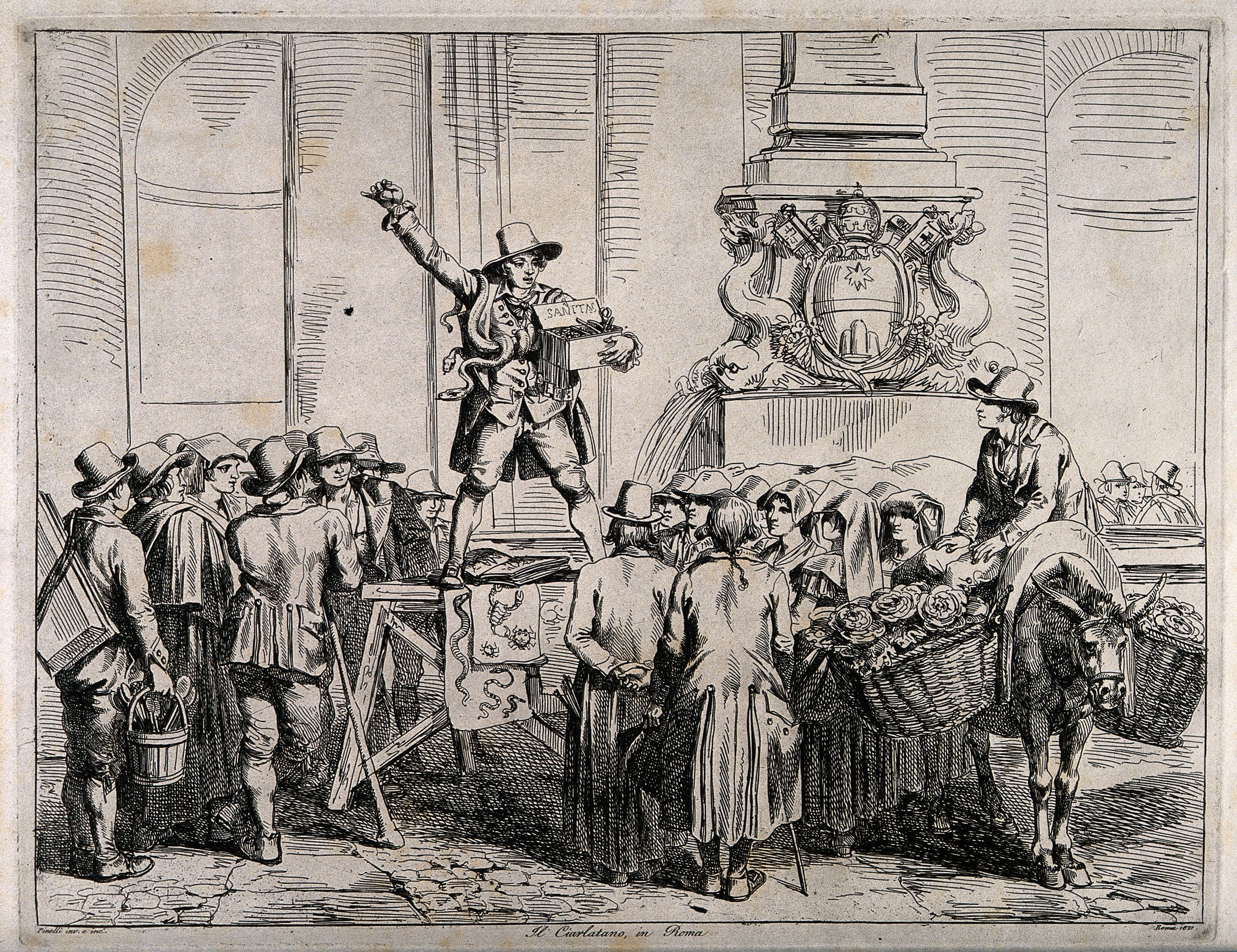
Itinerant salesman in Rome draped with snakes

In 18th-century Europe, especially in Britain, viper oil had been commonly recommended for many afflictions, including the ones for which oil from the rattlesnake (pit viper), a type of viper native to America, was subsequently favored to treat rheumatism and skin diseases. Though there are accounts of oil obtained from the fat of various vipers in the Western world, the claims of its effectiveness as a medicine have never been thoroughly examined, and its efficacy is unknown. It is also likely that much of the snake oil sold by Western entrepreneurs was illegitimate and did not contain ingredients derived from any kind of snake. Snake oil in the United Kingdom and the United States probably contained modified mineral oil. William Rockefeller Sr., the father of John D. Rockefeller, peddled literal snake oil.

At the turn of the 20th century, after the American Civil War, patent medicine shows began traveling around America. Medicine shows combined a performance, advertisement, and store, all selling their own snake oils. Patent medicine shows had upwards of 20 performers, often including black musicians, a doctor, comic sketches, advertisements for their wares (which often included narcotics or alcohol), and musical performances performed by black musicians, sometimes done in blackface. These medicine shows leaned on and evoked knowledge and iconography from many cultures, including medieval Europeans, Native American, African American, and Southern American cultures in order to persuade and delight audiences with their shows and products. In 20th-century America, snake oil became a common media trope, led in part by the 1915 case regarding Stanley's Snake Oil, created by Clark Stanley, who was found guilty of misbranding the solution he was selling, as well as falsely representing it as a cure for many maladies, such as sciatica, sore throat, and aches and pains.

Patent medicines and snake oils were sold over the counter, by mail, or in traveling shows in the 20th century. Products such as menstrual cure-alls benefited from this, given they afforded the customer privacy. Not all snake oil products were placebo cure-alls or medicines that had no benefits. Many of the medicines would parade large effects, such as the ability to cure any sort of ailment, but would use medicinal plants that have a positive benefit on those taking it. Lydia Pinkham sold a vegetable compound that was supposed to cure many serious illnesses, but it was taken by women for menstrual cramps and various menopause symptoms. Alcohol, which was often a key ingredient in snake oils, allowed for the preservation of extracts and acted as a solvent for the medicines within. However, others included toxic plants such as Dr. Guild's Green Mountain Asthmatic Component, which had belladonna and stramonium in it.

The creation of the Food and Drug Administration in the 1930s, and the passage of the Pure Food and Drug Act in 1906, is largely credited with the downfall of snake oil vendors and patent medicine industries in the United States. The Pure Food and Drug act "prohibited the sale of misbranded or adulterated food and drugs in interstate commerce and laid a foundation for the nation’s first consumer protection agency, the Food and Drug Administration (FDA)".

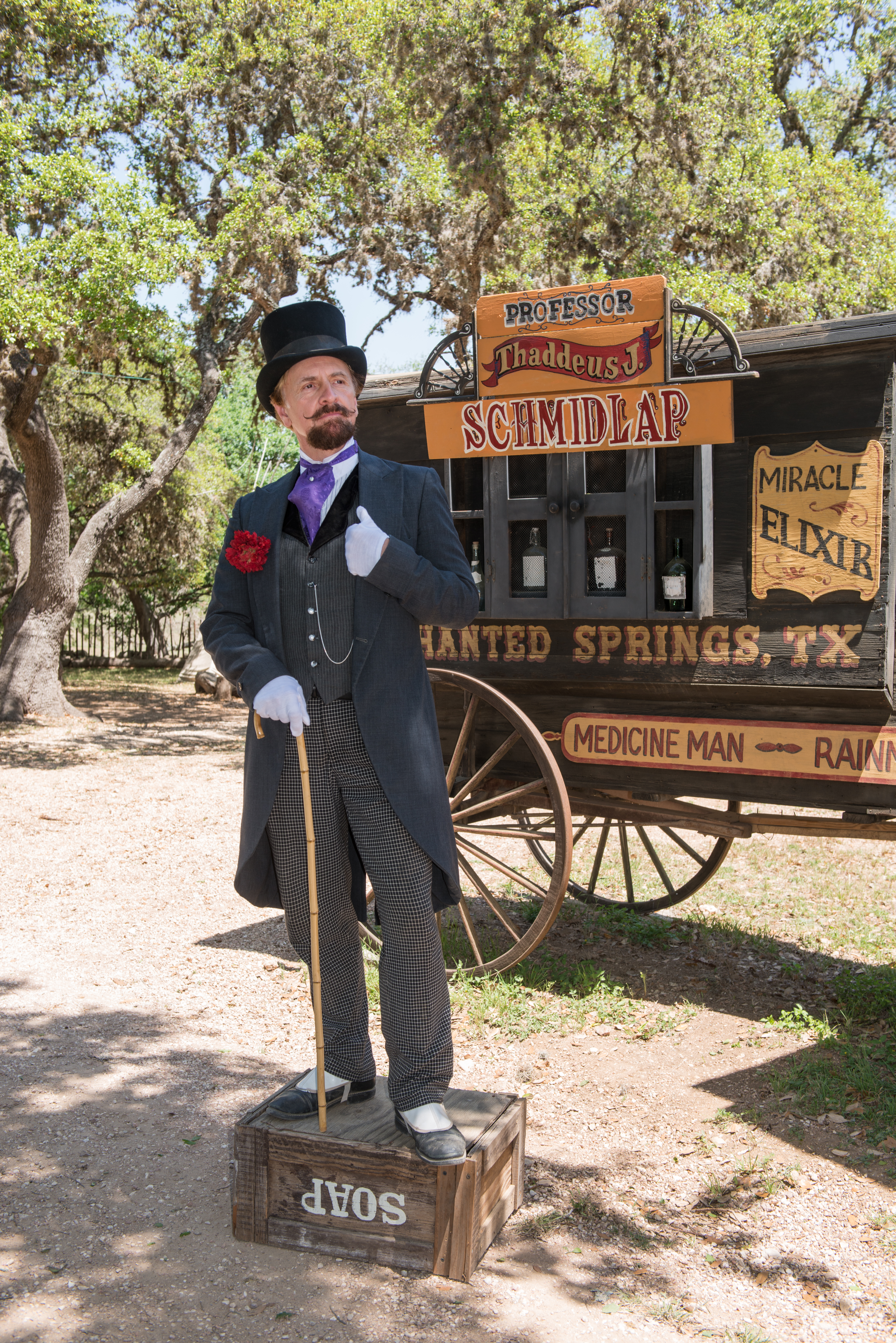
A historical reenactor representing a traveling snake oil salesman from the United States in 2014.

== Media ==
A common trope in Western films, selling snake oil is portrayed as a confidence trick: a traveling salesman purports to be a doctor (with false credentials), selling fake medicines with boisterous marketing hype, and supported by pseudo-scientific evidence. To increase sales, an accomplice in the crowd (a shill or a "toadie") will often attest to the value of the product in an effort to provoke buying enthusiasm. The "doctor" will leave town before his customers realize they have been cheated. This trope is associated with the American Old West. However, the famous judgment that sparked the most controversy happened in 1916, when Stanley's Snake Oil was discovered to contain no actual snake oil, creating the notion that bottles of snake oil (and their salesmen) were essentially a fraud. That case took place in Rhode Island, and involved snake oil being shipped to Massachusetts, far away from and substantially later than the Old West. In Outlaw Women, a character named Uncle Barney runs a medicine show, bringing it to Las Mujeres, where he becomes a bartender, still selling his patent medicine from the bar.

In animation, snake oil of all kinds can be seen being bought by characters throughout history. Betty Boop becomes a Snake Oil Salesman in Betty Boop, M.D., selling "Jippo", which claims to flatten feet, make men young again, removes teeth, stops breathing, and grows tonsils. It also showcases the performance aspect of these patent medicine shows, with a clown performing contortionist tricks, as well as Betty Boop coming out to sing a song persuading people to buy "Jippo". "Jippo" is revealed to just be water from a fire hydrant.

== From cure-all to quackery ==
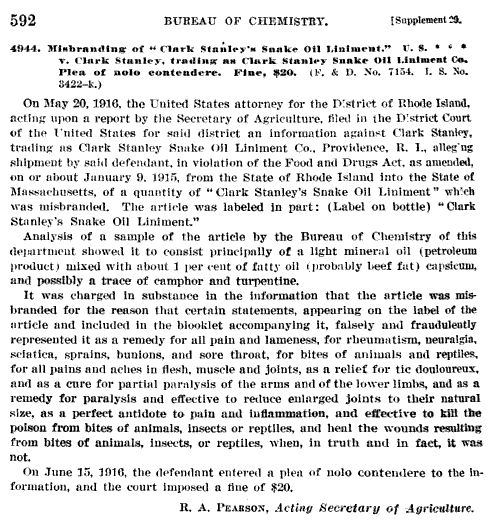
A report of the 1916 decision of the United States District Court for Rhode Island, fining Clark Stanley $20 for "misbranding" its "Clark Stanley Snake Oil Liniment".

Clark Stanley's Snake Oil Liniment – produced by Clark Stanley, the "Rattlesnake King" – was tested by the United States government's Bureau of Chemistry, the precursor to the Food and Drug Administration (FDA) in 1916. It was found to contain: mineral oil, 1% fatty oil (assumed to be tallow), capsaicin from chili peppers, turpentine, and camphor.

In 1916, subsequent to the passage of the Pure Food and Drug Act in 1906, Clark Stanley's Snake Oil Liniment was examined by the Bureau of Chemistry, and found to be drastically overpriced and of limited value. As a result, Stanley faced federal prosecution for peddling mineral oil in a fraudulent manner as snake oil. In his 1916 civil hearing instigated by federal prosecutors in the U.S. District Court for Rhode Island, Stanley pleaded nolo contendere (no contest) to the allegations against him, giving no admission of guilt. His plea was accepted, and as a result, he was fined $20 (about $592 in 2025).

The term snake oil has since been established in popular culture as a reference to any worthless concoction sold as medicine, and has been extended to describe a wide-ranging degree of fraudulent goods, services, ideas, and activities such as worthless rhetoric in politics. By further extension, a snake oil salesman is commonly used in English to describe a quack, huckster, or charlatan.

== Modern implications ==
False health products described by medical experts as "snake oil" continue to be marketed during the 21st century, including herbal medicines, dietary supplements, products such as Tibetan singing bowls (when used for healing) and treatments such as vaginal steaming. Companies such as Goop have been accused of selling snake oil in some of their health products and recommendations.

Neuriva, claimed as a "brain-enhancement" supplement, has been called "snake oil" by a professor at Ohio State University, due to a lack of research into efficacy, as well as no FDA backing. A 2021 Neuriva celebrity marketing campaign featured Mayim Bialik. A 2022 Neuriva celebrity marketing campaign featured Alton Brown. In 2023, the makers of Neuriva settled a lawsuit that bars them from claiming its benefits are backed by science.

During the COVID-19 pandemic, the Xinhua News Agency claimed that the herbal product Shuanghuanglian can prevent or treat infections from coronaviruses, stimulating sales across the United States, Russia, and China. However, the clinical studies on its effectiveness have been inconclusive. Su et al. published a report that the herbal substance has been shown in vitro to be cytotoxic "against a clinical isolate of SARS-CoV-2". However, another government media outlet, People’s Daily, published a contrasting report urging citizens not to purchase the herbal remedy as it had not been recommended for coronavirus antiviral treatment and treatment measures had not passed clinical trials.

== See also ==
- Beecham's Pills
- Carlill v Carbolic Smoke Ball Co
- Daffy's Elixir
- Dalby's Carminative
- False advertising
- Hadacol
- Homeopathy
- Lydia Pinkham
- MLM companies
- Nine oils
- The Old Fashioned Way (film)
- Orvietan
- Patent medicine
- Revalenta arabica
- Turlington's Balsam
