= Jane Wallis Burrell =

American intelligence officer (1911–1948)

Jane Wallis Burrel
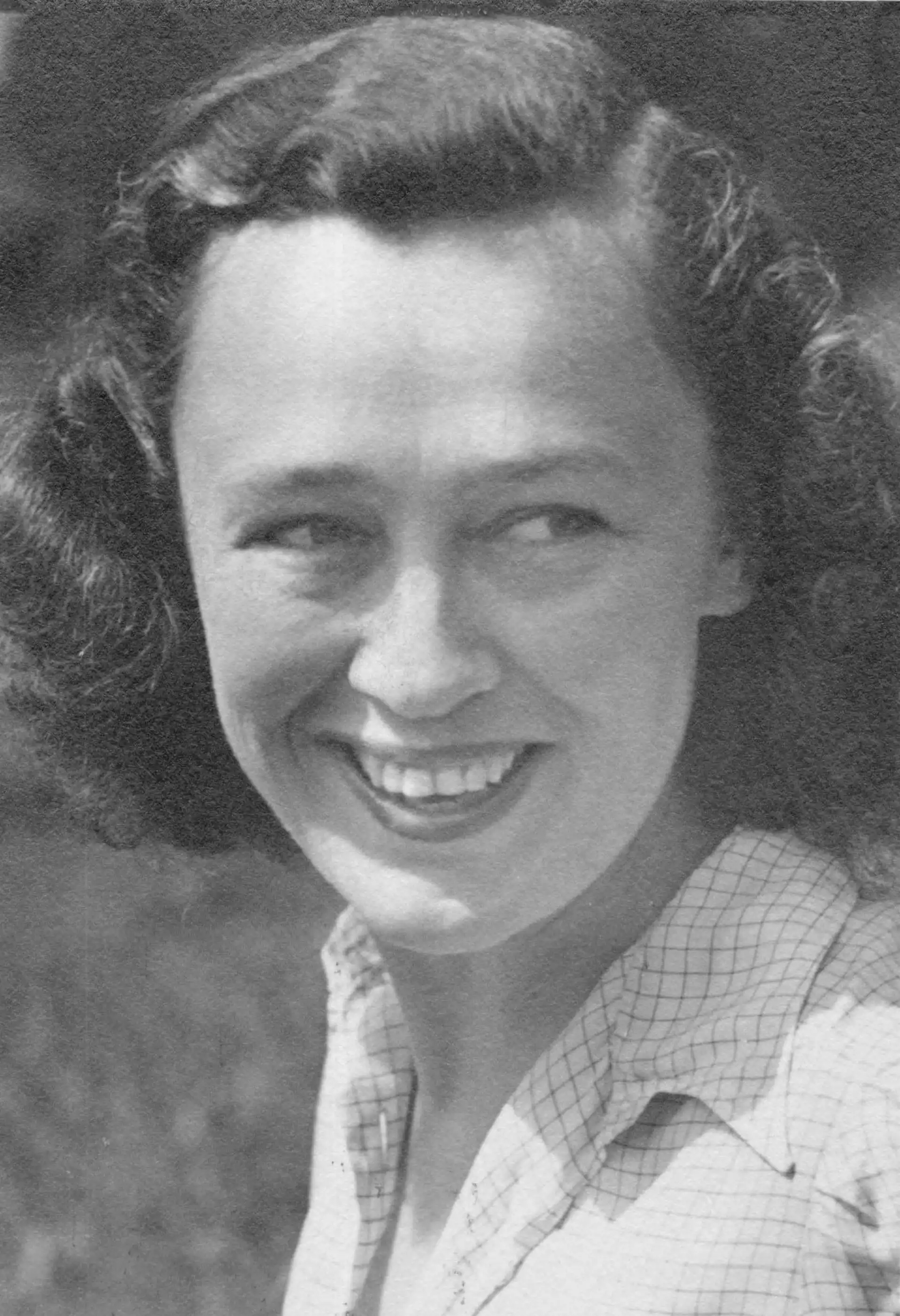
- Born: September 22, 1911; Dubuque, Iowa, U.S.
- Died: January 6, 1948 (aged 36); Paris–Le Bourget Airport; Paris, France
- Cause of death: Plane crash
- Education: Smith College
- Occupation: US intelligence officer
- Employer(s): Office of Strategic Services, X-2 Counter Espionage Branch, Central Intelligence Agency
- Known for: First CIA officer to be killed in the line of service
- Spouse: David Burrell (m. 1933; sep. 1946)
- Father: James Harold Wallis

Jane Wallis Burrell (September 22, 1911 – January 6, 1948) was an American intelligence officer during World War II and the early part of the Cold War. She studied in the US, Canada and France in the 1930s and traveled widely in Europe. Wallis Burrell later became a housewife before joining the Office of Strategic Services (OSS) as a clerk in 1943. Her work in photographic analysis was commended and she was chosen to join the new X-2 Counter Espionage Branch. She transferred to London in December 1943 and followed the Sixth United States Army Group to France and Germany in the following years. Wallis Burrell's work with double agents helped to deceive German forces prior to the liberation of Brest, France.

After the German surrender she tracked down and interrogated Nazi officials and recovered counterfeit gold currency. She worked for the OSS's successor organizations, the Strategic Services Unit and the Central Intelligence Group before joining the Central Intelligence Agency on its establishment in September 1947. While flying back to Paris from Belgium on official business in January 1948 her plane crashed and she was killed, becoming the first CIA officer to be killed in the line of service.

== Early life ==
Jane O'Neil Wallis was born in Dubuque, Iowa, in 1911. She was the daughter of newspaper editor, writer and local politician James Harold Wallis. The family moved to Washington, D.C., in 1921 when Wallis became a speechwriter for Herbert Hoover, who was then United States Secretary of Commerce. Wallis graduated from Holton-Arms School, an all-girls school which was then located in Washington, D.C., in 1929. She went on to study French and English literature at Smith College in Northampton, Massachusetts. She was president of the college's French club and studied abroad in Montreal, Grenoble and at the Sorbonne in Paris. During this time she traveled widely, also visiting Germany, Italy and Spain.

Wallis graduated in 1933 and eloped with David Burrell to live in New York state where his family had a dairy machine business. She was afterwards a housewife, but the couple had no children. Wallis Burrell studied French language and English literature at New York's Columbia University between 1936 and 1937.

== World War II ==
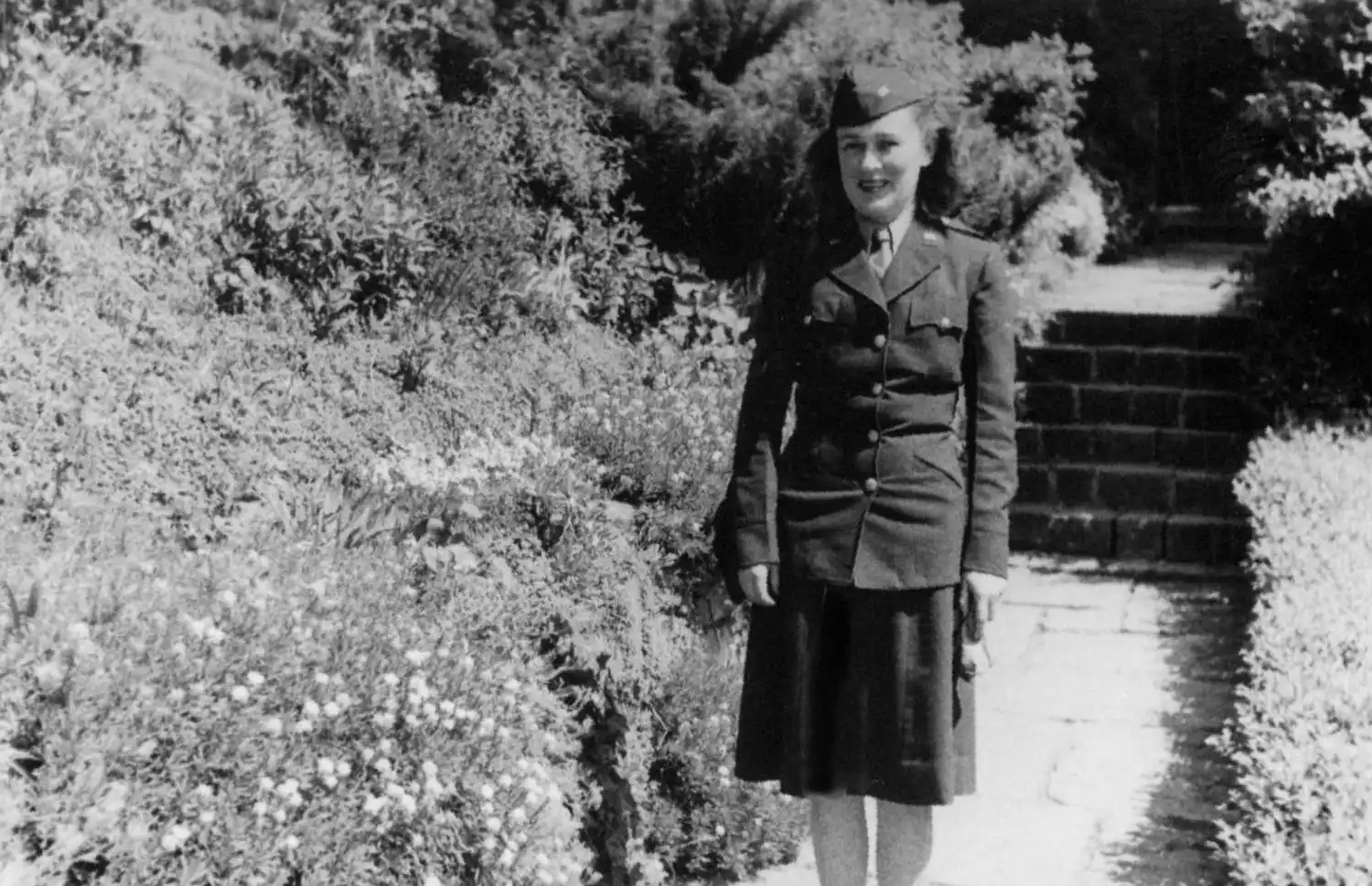
Wallis Burrell was deployed to Heidelberg in 1945.

Wallis Burrell applied for a US government position in 1941 and in 1943 moved to Washington, D.C., when her husband, who had joined the US Navy, was assigned to the Naval Air Station Anacostia. In March 1943 Wallis Burrell was appointed a junior clerk in the recently established intelligence agency, the Office of Strategic Services (OSS), on an annual salary of $1,440 (men in the same position earned $4,600). Wallis Burrell was assigned to the Pictoral Records Section, helping to analyze more than a million pre-war photographs of now-Nazi occupied Europe. These were used to develop maps and identify potential targets; her familiarity with Europe helped her in this role. Wallis Burrell's work in this field attracted the attention of James R. Murphy head of counter-intelligence at OSS. In 1943 he was placed in charge of the newly founded X-2 Counter Espionage Branch which Wallis Burrell and Eloise Page joined and helped to establish.

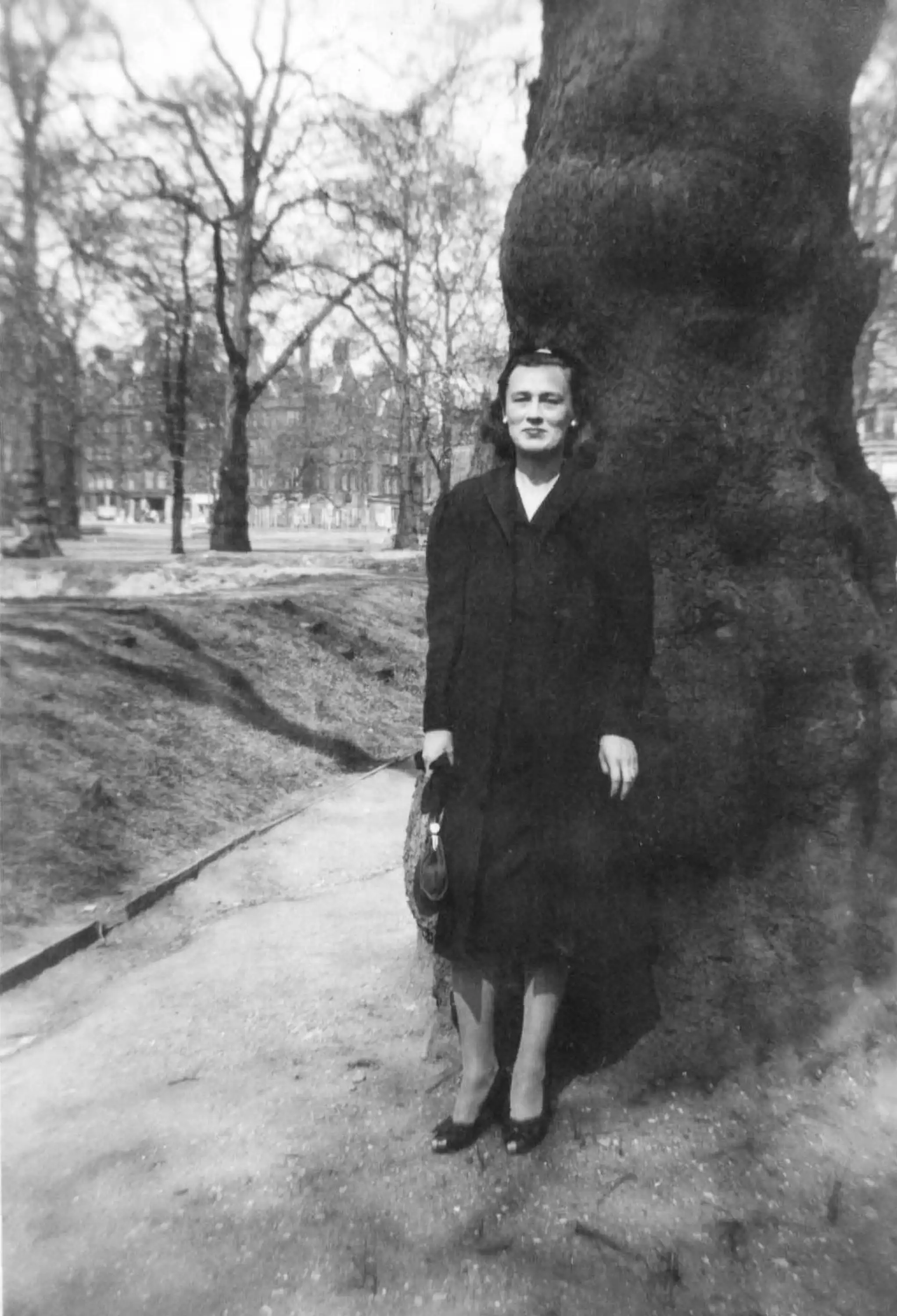
Wallis Burrell was based out of London for a decent portion of the war.

In July 1943 Wallis Burrell was told she would be transferred overseas. She was posted to London in December 1943. From 1944 she was assigned as a case officer and from May that year was part of the intelligence team assigned to the Sixth United States Army Group. Following the June 6 invasion of France she worked in Normandy. As part of the Double-Cross System she operated a Spanish agent, Juan Frutos, and directed him to feed false information to the Nazis about troop positions ahead of the liberation of Brest. During the war she came into possession of a letter written by German security chief Reinhard Heydrich to SS commander Heinrich Himmler on December 31, 1934; she kept the letter as a memento but never discussed how she obtained it.

== Post-war ==
In the period after the May 8, 1945, German surrender Wallis Burrell operated in Allied-occupied Germany. From May 17 she was based in Munich where she worked with a German agent she had turned to track down high-ranking German officials. She also took part in debriefing captured Nazi officials at an interrogation center in Wiesbaden. Wallis Burrell also worked with other X-2 operatives to track down counterfeit gold currency dumped by the SS in Lake Toplitz, Austria. Part of her role was also as liaison with the Monuments, Fine Arts, and Archives program, who attempted to recover cultural works looted by the Nazis.

The OSS was dissolved in October 1945 and only one in three overseas X-2 officers were selected to serve with the successor Strategic Services Unit (SSU), Wallis Burrell was one of these. She returned to Washington, D.C., in November 1945. Wallis Burrell separated from her husband in January 1946; they had disagreed over her intention to return to Europe with the intelligence services, as he wanted to continue with the family business. On May 6, 1946, she passed an SSU indoctrination course and was promoted to the P-2 grade and her salary increased to $2,980. Wallis Burrell returned to France with the SSU in July and afterwards worked for it and its successor organizations as an operations officer, though her official role was reports officer. She joined the Central Intelligence Group in October 1946, becoming part of the 40% of SSU overseas officers to be retained.

== Death and legacy ==
Wallis Burrell joined the Central Intelligence Agency when it was established in September 1947. One of the US's wartime agents, George Spitz, was arrested in Belgium and accused of collaboration with the German occupiers. Wallis Burrell flew to Brussels to provide testimony that he had served the Allied war effort. She was returning to Paris on an Air France Douglas DC-3 aircraft on January 6, 1948, when it crashed while landing at Paris–Le Bourget Airport. The aircraft rolled onto its side and caught fire, killing 15 of the 16 people on board.

For security reasons the CIA downplayed Wallis Burrell's role; in releases made to the media she was described as a clerk or courier returning from vacation. Wallis Burrell was actually the first CIA officer to be killed in the line of service, just 110 days after the organization had been established. The CIA did not send a representative to her funeral, for which the Paris CIA station chief, Philip Horton, apologized to her father. Wallis Burrell was determined not to qualify for the CIA Memorial Wall as her death occurred on a commercial flight. After her death her parents established a memorial scholarship in her name at Smith College to help students spend a year studying in France, it continued until at least 2016. Wallis Burrell's work laid the foundation for the CIA's approach to anti-Soviet intelligence in the early Cold War, particularly in the recruitment and handling of spies.
