= The Greater Love (play) =

1927 play by James Bernard Fagan

- Original language: English
- Written by: James Bernard Fagan
- Genre: Drama

Premiere
- Date: 11 September 1927
- Place: Prince's Theatre, London

The Greater Love is a 1927 play by the Irish writer James Bernard Fagan.

It ran for 53 performances at the Prince's Theatre in London's West End between 23 February and 9 April 1927. The original cast included Sybil Thorndike, Charles Laughton, Basil Gill, Lawrence Hanray, Lewis Casson, Colin Keith-Johnston and Brember Wills.

== Bibliography ==
- Wearing, J.P. The London Stage 1920-1929: A Calendar of Productions, Performers, and Personnel. Rowman & Littlefield, 2014.
