= J. H. Wallis =

American writer

J. H. Wallis (1885–1958) was a writer whose 1942 best-selling book Once Off Guard (later published as The Woman in the Window) was made into a film, The Woman in the Window (1944), directed by Fritz Lang.

== Biography ==
James Harold Wallis was born in Iowa and educated at Yale. He was a newspaperman in Iowa, later writing full-time in New York.

== Personal life ==
Wallis' daughter, Jane O’Neil Wallis Burrell, was the first CIA employee to die on the job.

== Works ==
This list is incomplete.

- Youth [poems]. The Gorham Press. 1907.
- The Testament of William Windune: And Other Poems. Yale University Press. 1916.
- Murder by Formula (1931)
- The Capital City Mystery (1932)
- The Servant of Death (1932)
- Cries in the Night (1933)
- The Mystery of Vaucluse (1933)
- Murder Mansion (1934)
- Once Off Guard. E.P. Dutton. 1942.
- The Niece of Abraham Pein (1943)
