= Leo Spitz =

American film studio executive (1888–1956)

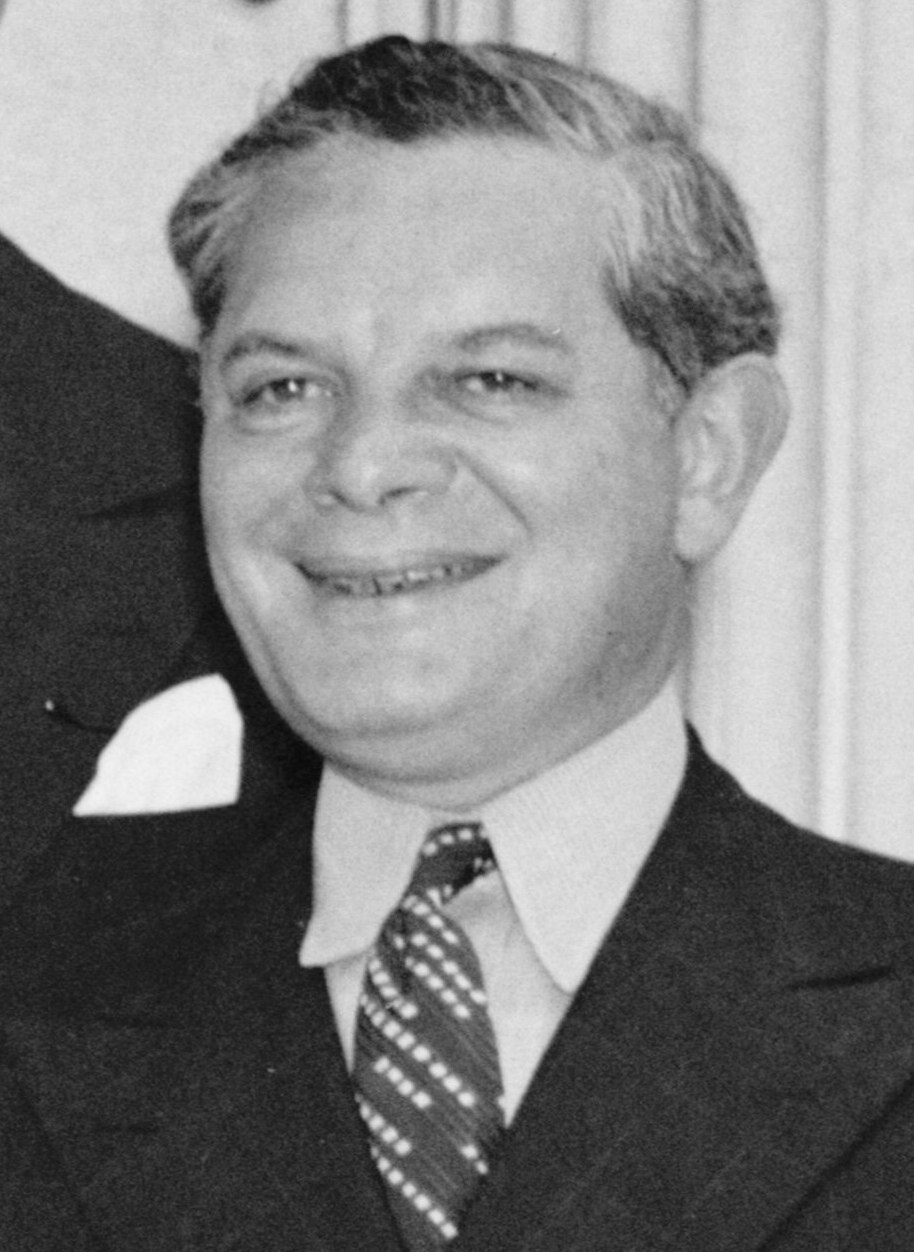
Spitz in 1938

Leo Spitz (1888 in Chicago – April 16, 1956) was an American film executive, best known for running International Pictures with William Goetz. When International merged with Universal Studios to form Universal-International in 1946, Spitz and Goetz ran the studio together. From 1950 to 1956 he owned a home in Palm Springs, California. He was interred at Forest Lawn Memorial Park in Glendale, California.
