= Bella Donna (novel) =

1909 novel by Robert Hichens

- Author: Robert Hichens
- Language: English
- Genre: Drama
- Publication date: 1909
- Publication place: United Kingdom
- Media type: Print

Bella Donna is a 1909 British decadent novel by the British writer Robert Hichens.

== Summary ==
Mrs. Chepstow, a disreputable English divorcée, marries Mr. Armine, an Egyptologist, much to the chagrin of the latter's friend, the Jewish physician Dr. Isaacson. Once on the archaeological site Mrs. Armine falls for Mahmoud Baroudi, a suave Egyptian prince, and plots to do away with her husband.

== Reception ==
It was listed among the top six bestselling books in the United States in the December 1909 (ranked sixth) and January 1910 (ranked second) issues of The Bookman.

== Adaptations ==
=== Film ===
- Bella Donna (1915 film), an American silent film starring Pauline Frederick
- Bella Donna (1923 film), an American silent film starring Pola Negri
- Bella Donna (1934 film), a British film starring Conrad Veidt
- Temptation (1946 film), an American film starring Merle Oberon

=== Stage ===
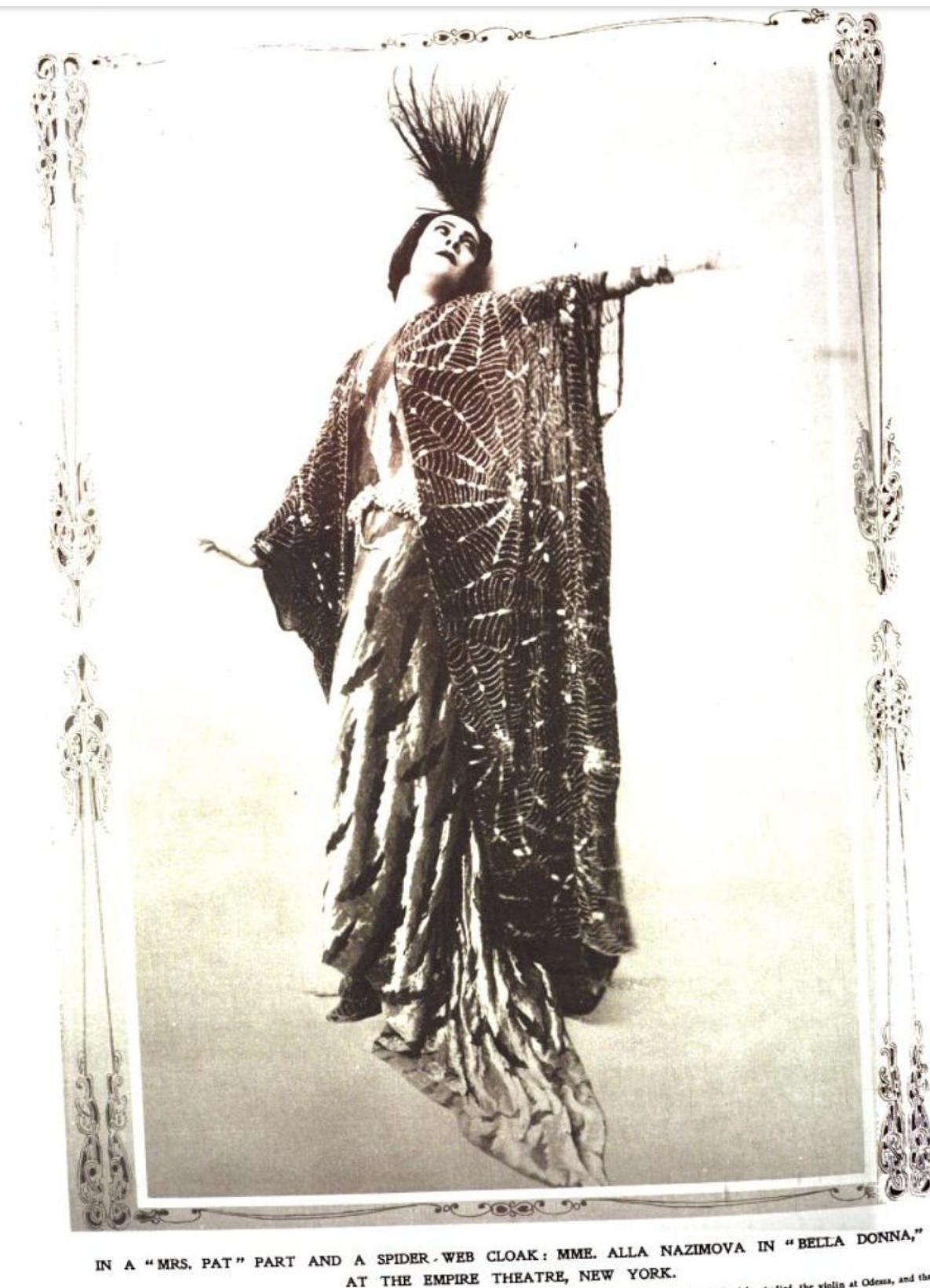
Alla Nazimova in Bella Donna, published in The Sketch (1913)

In 1912, a stage adaptation of Hitchens's novel, written by James Bernard Fagan premiered in New York. The production starred Alla Nazimova..

== Bibliography ==
- Goble, Alan. The Complete Index to Literary Sources in Film. Walter de Gruyter, 1999.
- Kotowski, Mariusz. Pola Negri: Hollywood's First Femme Fatale. University Press of Kentucky, 2014.
