= Clark Stanley =

American fraudster (born c. 1854)

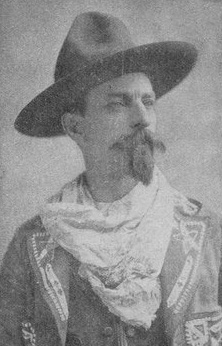
- Stanley as depicted on the cover of his book The Life and Adventures of the American Cow-Boy, 1897
- Born: c. 1854; Abilene, Texas, United States
- Known for: Source of the term "snake oil salesman"

Clark Stanley (born c. 1854 in Abilene, Texas, according to himself; the town was founded in 1881) was an American herbalist and quack doctor who marketed a "snake oil" as a patent medicine, styling himself the "Rattlesnake King" until his fraudulent products were exposed in 1916, popularizing the pejorative title of the "snake oil salesman".

== Career ==
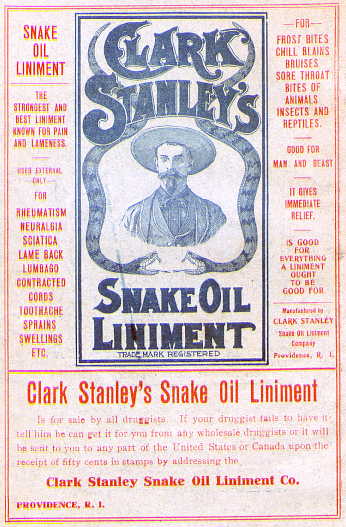
An advertisement for Clark Stanley's Snake Oil Liniment.

Stanley claimed that, starting in 1879, after eleven years working as a cowboy, he studied for more than two years with a Hopi medicine man at Walpi, Arizona. This supposedly included learning the "secrets of snake oil". With the help of a Boston druggist he began marketing his product at Western medicine shows. In 1893 he and his rattlesnakes gained attention at the World's Columbian Exposition in Chicago, Illinois. Later he went on to establish production facilities in Beverly, Massachusetts and Providence, Rhode Island.

In 1917, subsequent to the passage of the Pure Food and Drug Act in 1906, Stanley's concoction was examined and found to be of no value. It was found to contain mineral oil, a fatty compound thought to be from beef, capsaicin from chili peppers, and turpentine. He was fined $20 ($502.60 in 2025), while the term "snake oil" would go on to become a popular euphemism for ineffective or fraudulent products, particularly those marketed as medicines or cures.
