= Oliver Battcock =

English cricketer

Personal information
- Full name: Oliver Gordon Battcock
- Born: 16 September 1903; Slough, Buckinghamshire, England
- Died: 26 July 1970 (aged 66); Southwark, London, England
- Batting: Left-handed
- Bowling: Right-arm medium

Domestic team information
- Years: Team
- 1938–1939: Marylebone Cricket Club
- 1925–1951: Buckinghamshire

Career statistics
Competition	First-class
Matches	2
Runs scored	30
Batting average	30.00
100s/50s	–/–
Top score	27
Balls bowled	232
Wickets	2
Bowling average	51.00
5 wickets in innings	–
10 wickets in match	–
Best bowling	1/10
Catches/stumpings	–/–
- Source: Cricinfo, 8 May 2011

Oliver Gordon Battcock (16 September 1903 – 26 September 1970) was an English cricketer, actor and producer. Battcock was a left-handed batsman who bowled right-arm medium pace. He was born in Slough, Buckinghamshire.

Battcock made his debut for Buckinghamshire in the 1925 County Championship against the Kent Second XI. He played Minor counties cricket for Buckinghamshire from 1925 to 1939, and again from 1946 to 1951, making 115 appearances.

Battcock made the first of his two first-class appearances for the Marylebone Cricket Club in 1938 against Cambridge University. His second came the following season against Oxford University at Lord's. In his two first-class matches, he scored 30 runs at a batting average of 30.00, with a high score of 27. With the ball he took two wickets at a bowling average of 51.00, with best figures of 1/10.

As an actor, under the name Oliver Gordon, he made his West End debut in The Midshipmaid in August 1931. He subsequently played opposite such stage stars as Gerald du Maurier (in Diplomacy, 1933) and Seymour Hicks (in Vintage Wine, 1934), as well as appearing in several films. During World War II he ran the Theatre Royal, Windsor, inaugurating its longstanding tradition of lavish pantomimes. According to John Counsell, founder of the Windsor Repertory Company, he was able "for five years to maintain, in spite of the strains and stresses of man and woman power shortage, of rationing and lack of materials, an astonishingly high level of production." In later years he was closely associated as director-producer with both the Alexandra Theatre, Birmingham and Salisbury Playhouse; among his final credits, at Salisbury, was Widow Twankey in Aladdin (1969–70), which he also directed.

He was married to Gemma Fagan, daughter of Irish actor James Bernard Fagan.

He died in Southwark, London on 26 September 1970.
