= Tomorrow Is Forever =

1946 film by Irving Pichel

- Theatrical release poster
- Directed by: Irving Pichel
- Screenplay by: Lenore Coffee
- Based on: Tomorrow Is Forever a 1943 novel by Gwen Bristow
- Produced by: David Lewis
- Starring: Claudette Colbert; Orson Welles; George Brent
- Cinematography: Joseph Valentine
- Edited by: Ernest Nims
- Music by: Max Steiner
- Color process: Black-and-white
- Production company: International Pictures
- Distributed by: RKO Radio Pictures
- Release date: February 20, 1946
- Running time: 104 minutes
- Country: United States
- Language: English
- Budget: $1.3 million
- Box office: $3,250,000 (US rentals)

Tomorrow Is Forever is a 1946 American romantic drama film directed by Irving Pichel, adapted by Lenore Coffee from Gwen Bristow's 1943 serialized novel of the same name. Starring Claudette Colbert, Orson Welles, and George Brent, it was the film debut of both Richard Long and Natalie Wood. The film was produced by International Pictures, and distributed by RKO Radio Pictures.

== Plot ==
Promotional image from the film from a period ad.

In Baltimore, Elizabeth ("Liz") and John Andrew MacDonald had only been married for a year when John enlisted to fight in World War I. Just before Christmas in 1918, while awaiting word of his return after the war's end, Liz is notified by telegram of John's death. At the same time, she learns she is pregnant. She is supported during this difficult time by Lawrence "Larry" Hamilton, the owner of the chemical company at which she works, and, after the baby is born, Liz agrees to marry Larry, though she warns him that she could never love him the way she loved John. They raise the baby, named John Andrew after his father (though he goes by "Drew"), as Larry's, and later have a son, Brian, together.

By the time of the Nazi invasion of Poland in 1939, Drew is a young man, and he eagerly follows the news of the impending war. These international developments lead John, who is still alive, but, having been disfigured in the last war, has been living in Europe as an Austrian named Erik Kessler for the past two decades to avoid being a burden to Liz, to return to the United States. He brings with him young Margaret, who he says is his daughter, but is actually the daughter of Dr. Ludwig, the Austrian doctor who nursed him back to health, since Dr. Ludwig and his wife were killed by the Nazis.

Unaware that Larry has married Elizabeth, John begins working at Hamilton Chemical Works. He is invited to Larry's home to discuss work, and is stunned to see Liz, though she does not recognize him, as he has had plastic surgery and wears a beard and speaks English with a pronounced Austrian accent. John is again taken aback upon learning Drew's full name, as he realizes he must be Drew's father.

Since the United States has not yet joined the war, Drew is anxious to go to Canada and join the Royal Air Force to fight back against Hitler. John is supportive of Drew's ideas, but Elizabeth is horrified at the thought of losing her son the way she lost her first husband. She tells John that he is no longer welcome in her home for encouraging Drew to go to war, but her attitude softens after she learns the truth about Margaret. Over time, Liz begins to suspect "Erik" is actually John, but he denies his identity when she confronts him about it.

Drew decides to go to Canada without his parents' permission, but John intercepts him at the train station during a rain storm and brings him back home. Liz begs "Erik" to admit that he is really John, but he steadfastly refuses, instead imploring her to forget the past and live for the future. John leaves, and Liz goes upstairs and tells Drew that he can join the RAF. Back at home, John, worn out by his ordeal in the rain, collapses while trying to burn an old letter from Liz.

The next day, Liz and Larry visit John to thank him for bringing Drew home so he could reconcile with Liz. They find Margaret in tears and learn John has died. Liz comforts Margaret, and they bring her home to live with them, not noticing the partially burnt letter in the fireplace.

== Cast ==
- Claudette Colbert as Elizabeth "Liz" Hamilton
- Orson Welles as John Andrew MacDonald/Erik Kessler
- George Brent as Lawrence "Larry" Hamilton
- Lucile Watson as Jessica "Jessie" Hamilton, Larry's aunt
- Richard Long as John Andrew "Drew" Hamilton, Liz and John's son
- Natalie Wood as Margaret Ludwig, Dr. Ludwig's daughter
- John Wengraf as Dr. Ludwig, John's doctor
- Sonny Howe as Brian Hamilton, Liz and Larry's son
- Ian Wolfe as Norton, a manager at Hamilton Chemical Works
- Joyce MacKenzie as Cherry Davis, Drew's girlfriend
- Douglas Wood as Charles Hamilton, Larry's father (uncredited)
- Jesse Graves as Ambrose, the Hamiltons' butler in 1918 (uncredited)
- Henry Hastings as Daniel, the Hamiltons' butler in 1939 (uncredited)
- Charles D. Brown as the immigration inspector (uncredited)
- Tom Wirick as Pudge Davis, Drew's friend and Cherry's brother (uncredited)

== Production ==
William Goetz bought the novel for his new company International Pictures and assigned it to producer Davis Lewis. Lewis said the novel "had much to recommend it, but it was basically a mental exercise and not a piece of dramatic material." He decided that "if the first child born to the heroine belonged to her first husband, who was supposedly killed in the war, there would be someplace dramatic to go when the second husband came into play."

Lenore Coffee did the script.

Natalie Wood's screen test for the film required her to act out the scene in which a party popper makes her character recall the murder of her parents by the Nazis. Because she had worked with Irving Pichel on his previous film Happy Land, initially, she was too happy to see him to properly cry. During production, Wood had to wear a dental bridge after losing two of her baby teeth.

== Boycott ==
The film was boycotted in Aiken, South Carolina, because Orson Welles mistakenly identified the town as the location of Isaac Woodard's blinding. In July and August 1946, Welles devoted five episodes of his radio show Orson Welles Commentaries to the brutal attack on Woodard. Aiken is near Batesburg-Leesville, South Carolina where the attack actually occurred. Welles' initial misidentification of the location led to protests and threats of lawsuits in Aiken, in addition to the boycott of his current film.

== Reception ==
Bosley Crowther of The New York Times skewered the film as a "hackneyed and over-wrought telling of the Enoch Arden tale". He said that Welles' "studied display of overacting" distracts from the poor script and called Woods' acting "meretricious", before concluding that "Irving Pichel has directed the film ponderously from Lenore Coffee's vacuous script. Tomorrow seems forever coming after an hour and a half of what goes on."

Writing for Turner Classic Movies, Jeremy Arnold observed: “Like so many melodramas of the time, the story may be preposterous, but it is lent compassion and sensitivity by a talented cast and crew.”

On the review aggregator website Rotten Tomatoes, 60% of 5 critics' reviews of the film are positive, with an average rating of 6.5/10.

== Notes ==
- Lewis, David (1993). Curtis, James (ed.). The Creative Producer. Metuchen: Scarecrow Press. ISBN 0-8108-2720-4.
