= X-2 Counterintelligence Branch =

Counterintelligence branch of the OSS (World War II)

X-2

Agency overview
- Formed: 1943
- Dissolved: 1945
- Headquarters: E Street Complex, Washington, D.C.
- Agency executive: George Hunter White, Chief (1943); James R. Murphy, Chief (1943–1945)

The Counterintelligence Branch, or X-2, often mistakenly referred to as the Counter Espionage Branch (espionage is only one part of the larger intelligence field), was the most secretive branch of the Office of Strategic Services (OSS), acting as that organization's counterintelligence (CI) capability. As a CI force, their primary mission was to find moles and double agents, and had their field branch units posted away from the facilities of any of the other OSS field branches. In that capacity, hunting for Axis spies embedded within the Allied force, but especially within OSS, X-2 had the power to veto operations of the Special Operations (SO) and Secret Intelligence Branches (SI) without explanation. X-2 established separate lines of communication for itself as a self-contained unit. By the end of World War II, the X-2 had discovered around 3,000 Axis agents. X-2 was led by James R. Murphy at OSS/London, who took over command from George Hunter White, who had been sent on a mission to Calcutta.

William Donovan modeled the Counterintelligence Branch on British Counter Espionage. With the creation of the X-2 Branch, the British insisted that it follow British security procedures to maintain the secrecy of Ultra.

== Overview ==
X-2 was created in 1943 to provide liaison with and assist the British in its exploitation of the ULTRA program's intelligence during World War II. A few months before, Donovan had established a Counterintelligence Division within the Secret Intelligence Branch, but rescinded this order upon development of the X-2.

=== Background ===
With the beginning of World War II, the Office of the Coordinator of Information (COI), headed by William Donovan, was split and the Office of Strategic Services (OSS) created on 13 June 1942. The State Department and military services blocked the OSS from receiving communications intercepted from the Axis powers, through the Ultra program, until the OSS created its own X-2 Counterintelligence Branch. The FBI and Office of the Coordinator of Inter-American Affairs further limited the OSS by restricting it from operating in the Western Hemisphere. X-2 became the OSS liaison with the British, opened the doors of Ultra to OSS exploitation and operated throughout Europe and the world. At its peak at the end of the War, the X-2 Branch had 650 personnel in its office.

=== Missions ===
The missions of the X-2 Branch were to:

- Collect information on espionage and subversive activities of the enemy
- Analyze, process and exchange this intelligence
- Maintain operational security measures for the OSS and prevent infiltration of the OSS by enemy intelligence services
- Cooperate and give timely intelligence to United States' and allied intelligence services
- Create foreign area subversive personality lists to disseminate to commanders and intelligence personnel.

Donovan also established strong communication and sharing between the Secret Intelligence and X-2 Branches. He additionally allowed the X-2 Branch to use field representatives in coordination with the station chief and outlined that the X-2 would maintain separate communication lines, liaisons and records. X-2 had its main base for European operations in London but maintained liaison in Washington, D.C., with other agencies including the FBI, State Department, G-2 and Office of Naval Intelligence.

== Special units ==
=== Special Counterintelligence Units ===
The X-2 created Special Counterintelligence Units (SCI Units) to pass counterintelligence information between the Army and the OSS. These units existed between British MI-6 and the British military as well. SCI Units worked under Staff Counterintelligence (CI) Officers and assisted military CI staff in a multitude of areas, including on the frontlines. They advised military staff on selecting CI targets, distributing counter espionage (CE) information, protecting sources and interrogating captured suspects. X-2 officers handled collecting and exploiting enemy intelligence as well as supplying information on Axis intelligence agencies to Army staff throughout the theater of operations. They also served as channels between different Army Headquarters and received special training for their tasks.

=== Watch List Unit ===
The Watch List Unit disseminated information on agents such as their cover names, addresses and mail drops. It maintained liaisons with the US Censorship Office, British Imperial Censorship and French Censorship. It also passed information on enemy methods of secret communication.

=== Insurance Unit ===
The Insurance Unit's main task was to investigate enemy intelligence's use of insurance as a cover for its activities.

=== Counter Espionage Smuggling Unit ===
The Counter Espionage Smuggling Unit was intended to coordinate information on smuggling activities but never became effective due to low staffing.

=== Art Looting Investigation Unit ===
The Art Looting Investigation Unit (ALIU) worked under the direction of the London office and was created in 1944 to monitor funding for German subversive activities in the post-war period. The unit specifically attempted to collect information on activities and plans of the enemy by looking at individuals who disposed of stolen works of art and other high value items. The ALIU was created by Donovan at the request of Justice Owen Roberts, chairman of the American Commission for the Protection and Salvage of Artistic and Historic Monuments in War Areas (the Roberts Commission) and had ten members drawn mainly from the art world, including James S. Plaut, Théodore Rousseau, S. Lane Faison, Jr., Charles Sawyer, John Phillips, and Otto Wittman. In 1945–1946 the ALIU drafted a series of reports detailing the activities of people involved in art looting.

== Operations ==
X-2 ran operations throughout Europe as well as in North Africa, in places such as Algeria, and provided intelligence for large-scale operations such as Operation Anvil/Dragoon, a post D-Day landing in Europe. In its operations, X-2 used officers from other nations, including Spain and Canada, in positions as high as unit chiefs. X-2 operations also involved feeding false or harmless information to controlled agents in the field. The head of European X-2 operations was Norman Holmes Pearson.

=== Italy ===
X-2 officers' primary mission in Italy was to eliminate foreign services in the area, although they also received training on doubling and controlling agents, which the regular military counterintelligence lacked. James Jesus Angleton was assigned to the Rome detachment of X-2 in 1944 with the mission of turning around the faltering operations within a six-week time frame. In the end, he would move up from Rome chief to the head of all secret operations in Italy for the Strategic Services Unit after the war. One of Angleton's key contributions in Rome was his development of a book of information with concepts from Ultra that could be given to non-Ultra officers. With this information they could fish through POWs and suspects and then disseminate the information more widely once it had been found in a lower security clearance situation, i.e. Secret vice Top Secret.

Another important contribution to operations in Italy was Angleton's cultivation of relationships and liaisons with foreign intelligence services. He developed a contact in Italy's Royal Navy, Capitano di Fregata Carlo Resio, codenamed SALTY, in 1944, which yielded important information as the war went on. Angleton ran another agent, JK 1/8, in Italy's secret intelligence service. From the summer of 1944 on, this agent supplied the Allies with important information and corroboration of other agents such as SALTY.

=== France ===
Operations in France were varied. X-2 officers like Betty Lussier helped set up a French-Spanish counterintelligence unit in Nice. Later she worked on operations in which officers blended in with local communities in France to root out Nazi collaborators and stay-behind agents. Enemy agents were often given clandestine radio sets to communicate Allied movements. X-2 monitored and tracked signals from these radios to their sources and attempted to turn the users into double agents for the Allies, as in the case of Gordon Merrick, a former French lieutenant spying for the Germans in Perpignan.

== Communist penetration of the OSS ==
Although counterintelligence was its mission, the X-2 focused on Europe more than the OSS itself. The OSS employed Soviet sympathizers and spies in its offices in Washington, D.C., as well as other non-communist spies such as Donovan's aide, Duncan C. Lee. The Communists also penetrated OSS operations in China, participating in the training camps in addition to working as clerical staff and housekeepers.

== See also ==
- Deputy Director of the CIA for Operations
- Directorate of Operations (CIA)
