= Bella Donna (1915 film) =

1915 film by Edwin Stanton Porter, Hugh Ford

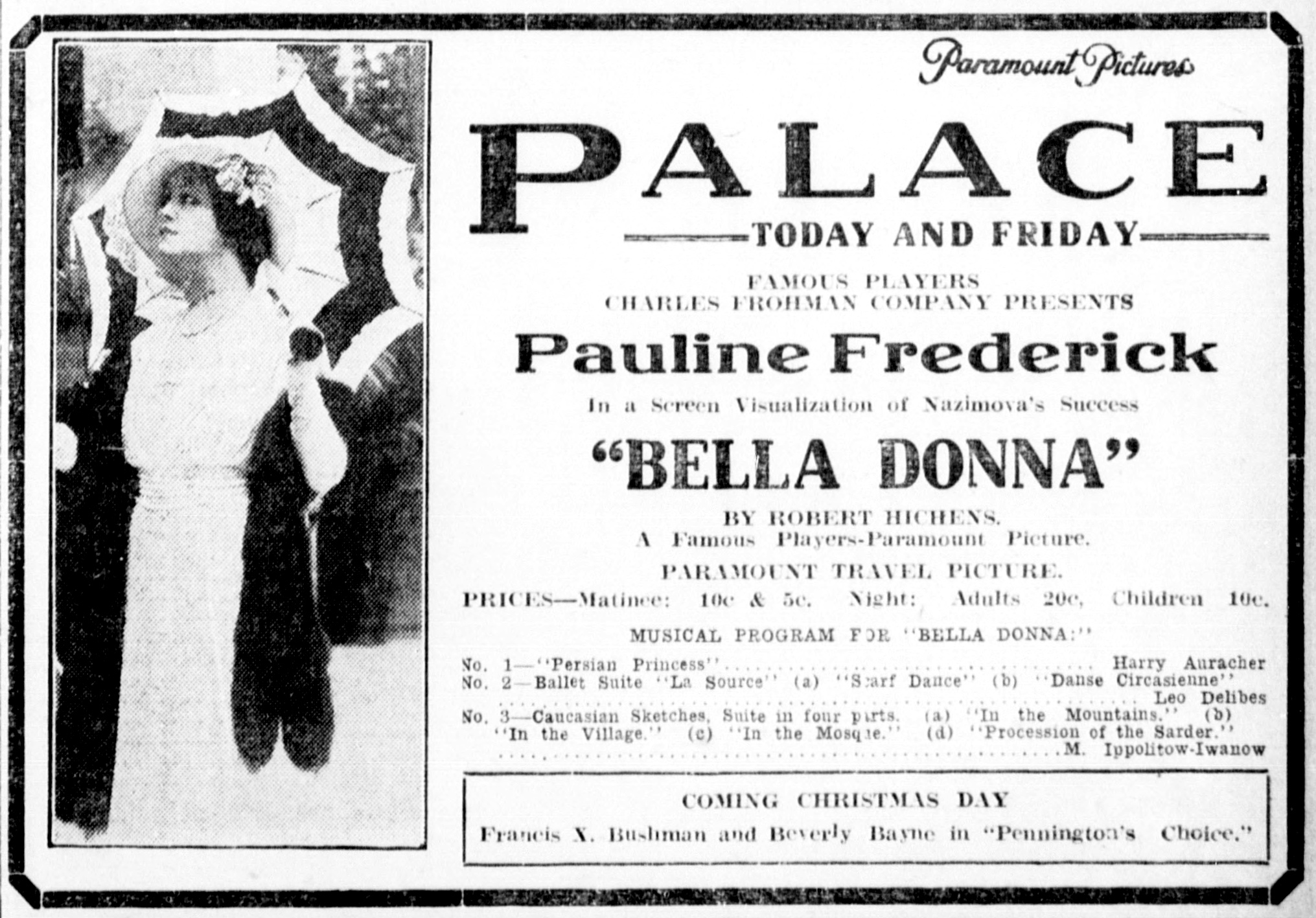
- Contemporary newspaper advertisement.
- Directed by: Edwin S. Porter; Hugh Ford
- Based on: Bella Donna by Robert Smythe Hichens Bella Donna by James Bernard Fagan
- Produced by: Adolph Zukor; Charles Frohman
- Starring: Pauline Frederick
- Production company: Famous Players–Lasky
- Distributed by: Paramount Pictures
- Release date: November 15, 1915
- Running time: 50 minutes
- Country: United States
- Language: Silent (English intertitles)

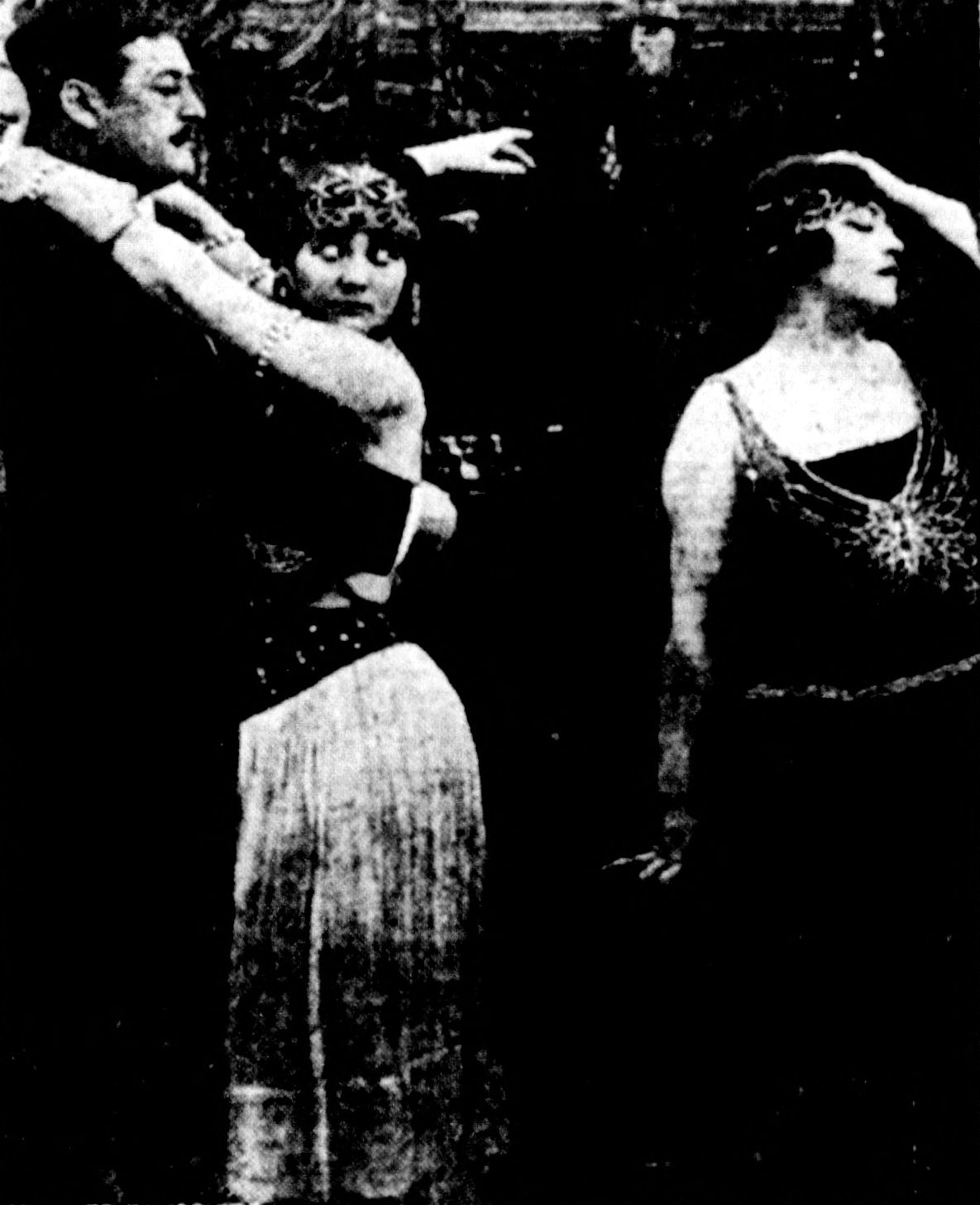
Scene in the film, L to R: Julian L'Estrange, Betty Blythe(uncredited), Pauline Frederick.

Bella Donna is a 1915 American silent drama film produced by Famous Players–Lasky and the Charles Frohman Company, starring Pauline Frederick, and based on the 1912 play Bella Donna by James Bernard Fagan adapted from the 1909 novel of the same name by Robert Smythe Hichens.

In 1912, Alla Nazimova starred in a Broadway stage version which ran for 72 performances. A second version of the novel and play was filmed in 1923 starring Pola Negri.

== Cast ==
- Pauline Frederick as Bella Donna
- Thomas Holding as Nigel Armine
- Julian L'Estrange as Baroudi
- Eugene Ormonde as Dr. Isaacson
- George Majeroni as Ibraham
- Edmund Shalet as Hamza
- Helen Sinnott as The Maid
- Betty Blythe as A Dancer (uncredited)

== Preservation ==
Bella Donna is currently presumed lost. In February of 2021, the film was cited by the National Film Preservation Board on their Lost U.S. Silent Feature Films list.

== See also ==
- Edwin S. Porter filmography
- List of lost films
