= Bella Donna (1923 film) =

1923 film

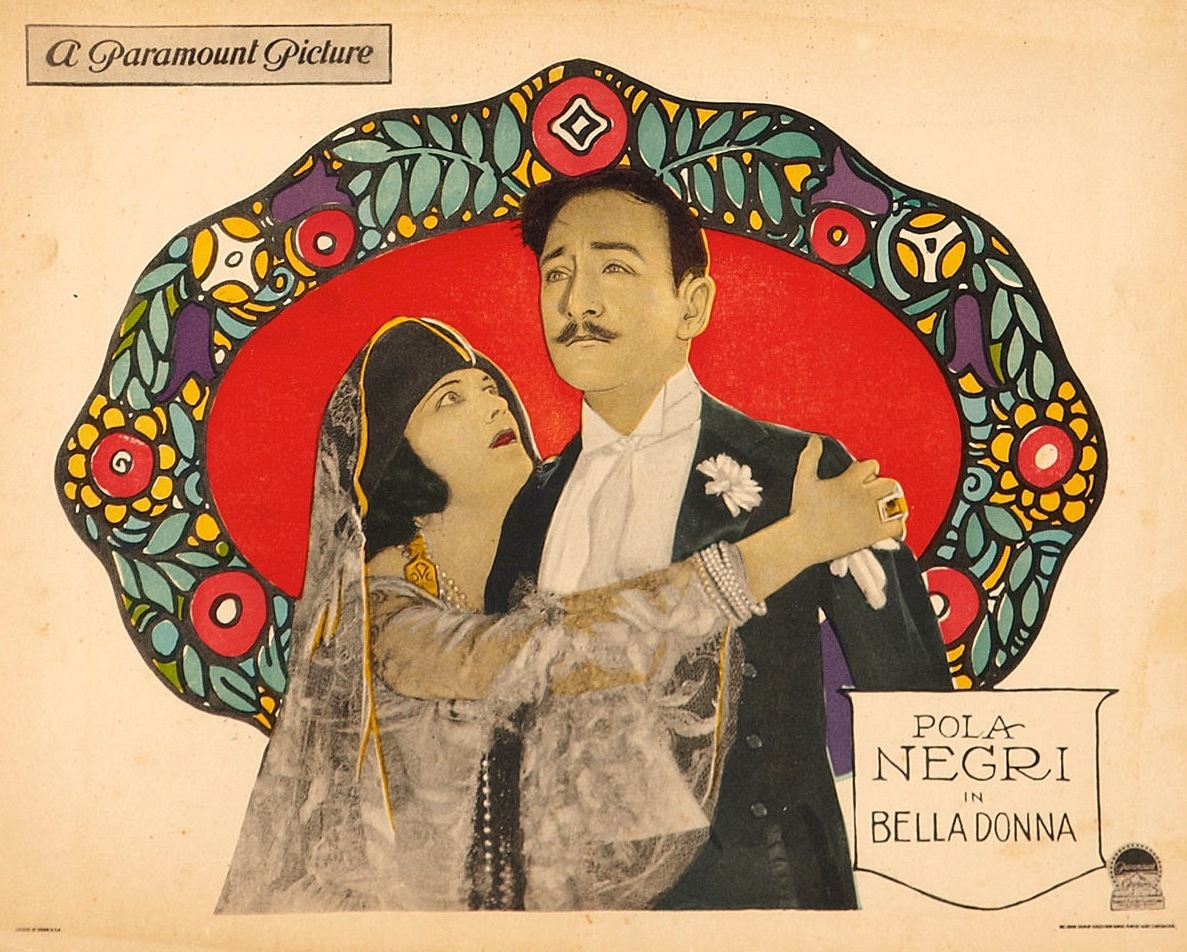
- Lobby card with Pola Negri and Adolphe Menjou
- Directed by: George Fitzmaurice
- Written by: Ouida Bergère (scenario)
- Based on: Bella Donna (novel) by Robert Smythe Hichens Bella Donna (play) by James Bernard Fagan
- Produced by: Adolph Zukor; Jesse L. Lasky
- Starring: Pola Negri
- Cinematography: Arthur C. Miller
- Music by: song "Bella Donna"; Ted Snyder (music); Harry B. Smith (lyrics)
- Distributed by: Paramount Pictures
- Release date: April 1, 1923
- Running time: 88 minutes
- Country: United States
- Language: Silent (English intertitles)

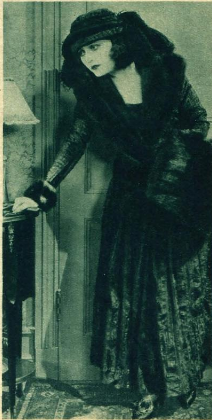
Pola Negri

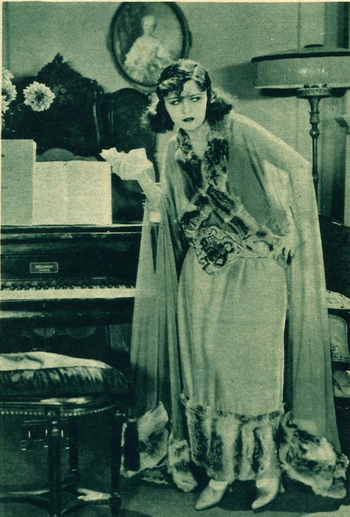
Pola Negri

Bella Donna is a 1923 American silent film produced by Famous Players–Lasky and released by Paramount Pictures. The film is based on the 1909 novel, Bella Donna, by Robert Smythe Hichens which was later adapted for a 1912 Broadway play starring Alla Nazimova. This film is also a remake of the 1915 Paramount film Bella Donna starring Pauline Frederick. The 1923 film was directed by George Fitzmaurice and starred Pola Negri in her first American film.

== Plot ==
Bella Donna, a seductive woman snares Nigel Armine into marriage and he takes her to Egypt to live. Tired of her simple husband, Bella becomes involved with brutish Baroudi.

== Cast ==
- Pola Negri as Bella Donna
- Conway Tearle as Mahmoud Baroudi
- Conrad Nagel as Nigel Armine
- Adolphe Menjou as Mr. Chepstow
- Claude King as Doctor Meyer Isaacson
- Lois Wilson as Patricia
- Antonio Corsi as Fortune Teller
- Macey Harlam as Ibrahim
- Robert Schable as Doctor Hartley

== Song ==
"Bella Donna (Beautiful Lady)" by Harry B. Smith, Arthur M. Brilant (words) and Ted Snyder.

== Phonofilm version ==
Reportedly the film played with sound provided by the De Forest Phonofilm sound-on-film process. This was probably music and sound effects but no dialogue, and was only at the April 1, 1923 premiere at the Rivoli Theatre in New York City.

Paramount also premiered The Covered Wagon in New York City on March 16, 1923. All or about two reels of The Covered Wagon had a music track recorded in the Phonofilm process, but was only shown this way at the premiere at the Rivoli Theater in New York City. On April 15, 1923, Lee de Forest presented a program of 18 short films made in the Phonofilm process, also at the Rivoli Theater.

== Preservation status ==
A print is reportedly held at the Gosfilmofond Archive in Moscow.
