= J. B. Fagan =

Actor, theatre manager, producer and playwright (1873–1933)

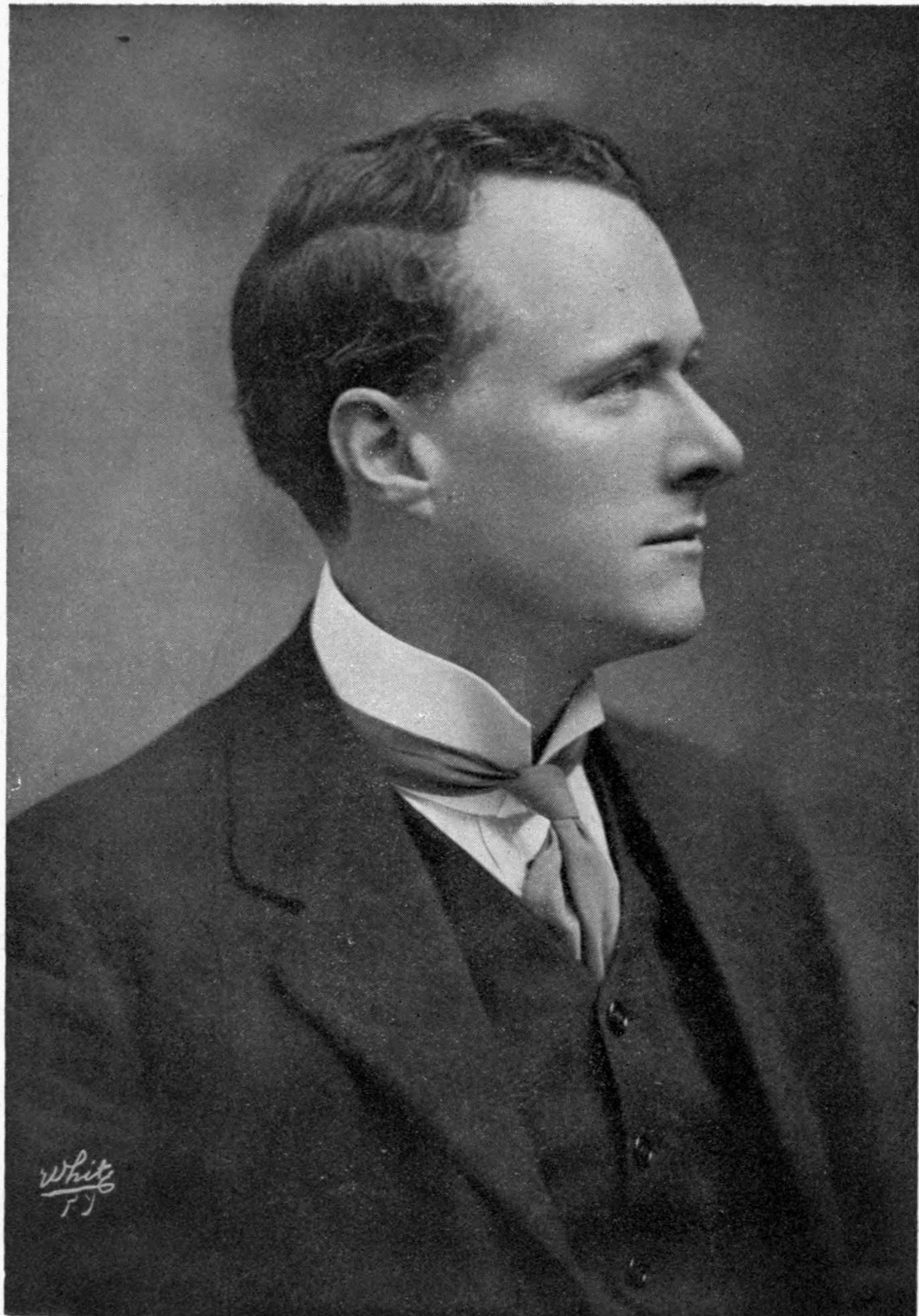
James Bernard Fagan

James Bernard Fagan (18 May 1873 – 17 February 1933) was an Irish-born actor, theatre manager, producer and playwright active in England. After turning from the law to the stage, Fagan began his acting career, including four years from 1895 to 1899 with Herbert Beerbohm Tree's company at Her Majesty's Theatre. He then began to write plays, returning eventually to acting during World War I. In 1920, he took over London's Court Theatre as a Shakespearean playhouse and soon began to produce plays at other West End theatres. His adaptation of Treasure Island in 1922 was a hit and became an annual Christmas event.

He was the first manager of the Oxford Playhouse for several years in the 1920s. As a producer, he popularised Anton Chekhov and Seán O'Casey in Britain. In 1929, he was a director of the Festival Theatre, Cambridge. Several of his plays were adapted for film, and he moved to Hollywood in his last years.

== Early life and career ==
Fagan was born in Belfast, the eldest of the five children (three boys and two girls). His father, Sir James Fagan, was a surgeon at the Belfast Royal Hospital and an inspector of Irish reformatories, and his mother was Mary Catherine Fagan, née Hughes. He attended Clongowes Wood College near Clane, County Kildare and then moved to England. Initially interested in a career in the church, Fagan began studying law at Trinity College, Oxford in 1892 but left in 1893 without a degree. He worked for a time in the Indian Civil Service but abandoned this career for the stage.

Fagan began his career as an actor with the company of Sir Frank Benson for two years, then joining, from 1895 to 1899, the company of Herbert Beerbohm Tree at Her Majesty's Theatre. There he appeared in Katherine and Petruchio, A Man's Shadow, Julius Caesar, The Musketeers and Carnac Sahib. He started writing plays in 1899, with The Rebels, for the time forsaking acting. Other early plays were The Prayer of the Sword (1904); Under Which King, a revue, Shakespeare v. Shaw, and Hawthorne, USA (all 1905); Gloria (1907); A Merry Devil and False Gods (a translation of Eugène Brieux's La foi (1909); The Dressing Room (1910); Bella donna (1911; adapted from Robert Hitchens's novel); and The Happy Island (1913). In 1913 he returned to the stage touring as the Rt Hon. Denzil Trevena in his own play, The Earth (originally produced in 1909). He next wrote The Fourth of August (1914) and Doctor O'Toole (1917). In 1917 he produced his first play, his own adaptation of the Brieux play Damaged Goods at St Martin's Theatre. He next produced The Wonder Tales and The Little Brother at the Ambassadors' Theatre in London.

He took over the Court Theatre in London's Sloane Square as a Shakespearean playhouse in 1920. The Times called his revivals of Twelfth Night, The Merchant of Venice, Henry the Fourth (Part Two) and A Midsummer Night's Dream "memorable for their freshness, sanity and distinction, and [deserving of] a place in theatrical history". The Merchant of Venice transferred to the Duke of York's Theatre, where Fagan also produced The Government Inspector and Madame Sand (both 1920). At the Court, he revived Damaged Goods and, in 1921, with the assistance of the author, produced G.B. Shaw's Heartbreak House, with Edith Evans as "Lady Utterwood". This was not a success and folded after 63 performances. In 1922 he produced his play The Wheel at the Apollo Theatre. Its success allowed him to repay his creditors. Even more successful was his adaptation of Treasure Island at the Savoy Theatre with Arthur Bourchier as "Long John Silver", which opened 26 December 1922. It was to be revived every Christmas until the outbreak of World War II.

== Oxford Playhouse and later years ==
Fagan was persuaded by Jane Ellis, the actress who with Alfred Ballard founded the Oxford Playhouse "Red Barn" in 1923, to be its first manager. A misfortune occurred while his effects were being transferred from London to Oxford; the lorry caught fire at Gerrard's Cross, and his rare book collection and irreplaceable original writings were destroyed, as well as stage properties and costumes. His attempt to license the theatre was stymied by the university's vice-chancellor, Dr Lewis Farnell, who had the power to prohibit staging of plays of which he disapproved (he had banned a Grand Guignol play starring Sybil Thorndike in Oxford in 1922 and a lecture by birth-control pioneer Marie Stopes in 1923). But Fagan's supporters, including the Chancellor George Curzon, forced a partial backdown.

His first production at the Oxford Playhouse was a restaging of Heartbreak House; Shaw was in the audience. Flora Robson, John Gielgud, Raymond Massey, Margaret Rutherford, Robert Donat and Tyrone Guthrie were in his company at the theatre. He produced The Cherry Orchard, at other theatres, to favourable reviews, popularising Anton Chekhov in Britain. From 16 November 1925, with Dennis Eadie, he presented Juno and the Paycock by Seán O'Casey at the Royalty Theatre. He staged O'Casey's The Plough followed the next year.

At the Oxford theatre, Fagan produced Full Moon, the first play by Emlyn Williams, and gave him a role in his own play, And So to Bed (1926), based on the life of Samuel Pepys, in London. Fagan received little support from the University of Oxford or the play-going public and resigned in 1929. His successor was Stanford Holme, who broadened its appeal and, despite the straitened times, made it financially viable. Other productions in these years included Strindberg's The Spook Sonata at the Globe Theatre (1927), as well as some New York City productions. His own plays in this period included The Greater Love (1927) and an adaptation of The Beetle (1928). In 1929, he was a director of the Festival Theatre, Cambridge, where his friend Terence Gray was director. Fagan also produced many works for the Irish Players.

Beginning in the 1920s, several of Fagan's plays were adapted for the cinema. Fagan moved to Hollywood in 1929 for the filming by Paramount of his play The Wheel as The Wheel of Life. Other film work included his co-adaptation of the screenplay for the 1932 film Smilin' Through, and he co-wrote Paramount's Forgotten Commandments the same year. His play Bella donna was filmed four times, including posthumously in 1946 (as Temptation), and a 1936 film, The Improper Duchess was based on his 1931 play of the same name.

== Personal ==
Fagan married first actress Elizabeth Kirby in 1897 and later another actress, who acted under the stage name of Mary Grey. She was previously Mrs. Ada Bevan Ritchie, née Ada Bryant, a sister of actor Charles Bryant. The couple's daughter, Gemma Fagan, was also an actress, who married the cricketer Oliver Battcock. Fagan's hobbies included golf and tennis.

He died in Hollywood, California, at the age of 59 of a heart attack following influenza.

== Selected plays ==
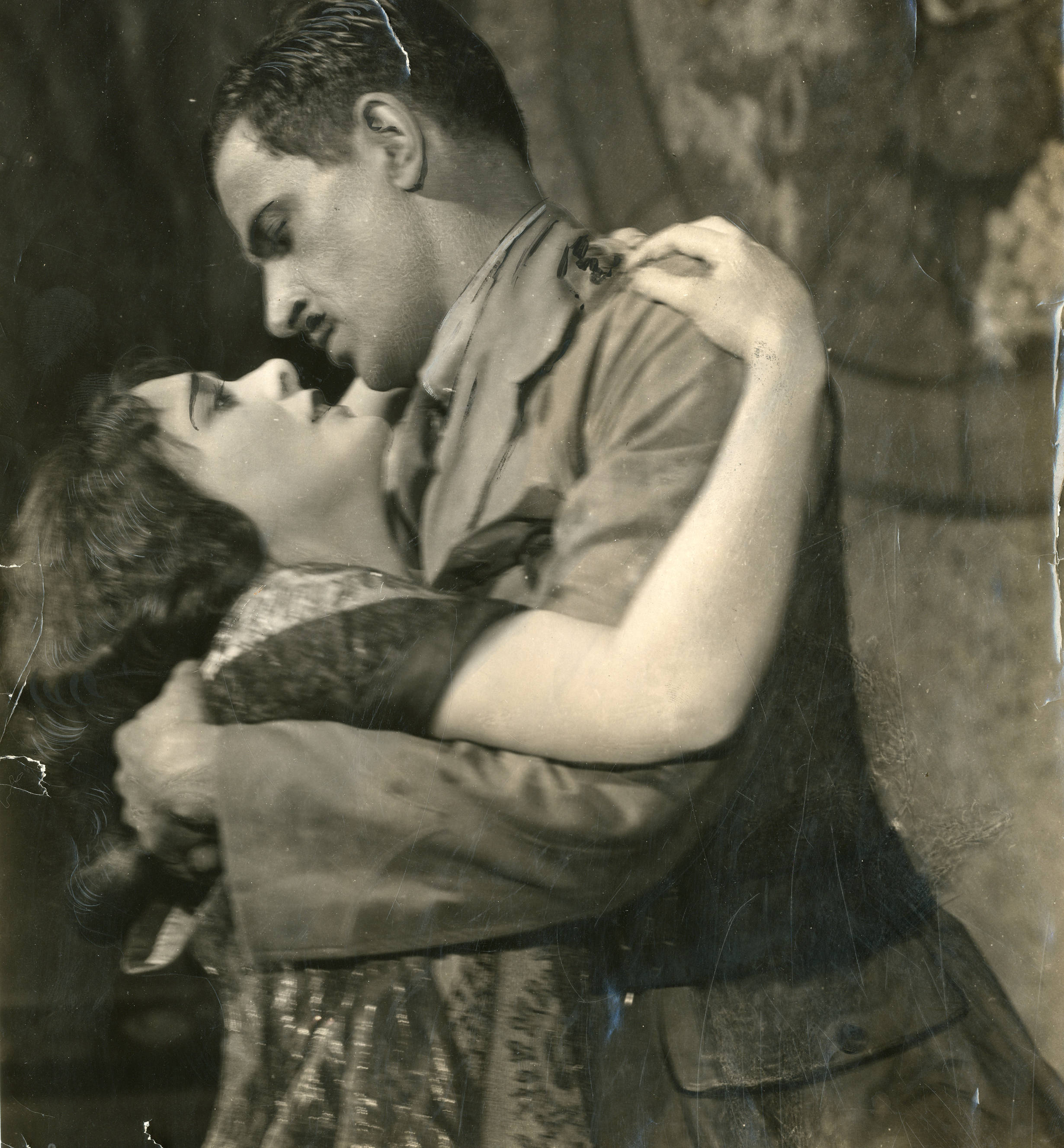
Elsie Ferguson and Frederick Worlock in The Wheel of Life, 1923

- The Prayer of the Sword (1904)
- The Earth (1910)
- Bella Donna (1912)
- Hawthorne of the U.S.A. (1913)
- The Wheel of Life (1922)
- And So, to Bed (1926)
- The Greater Love (1927)
- The Improper Duchess (1931)
- Doctor O'Toole (1938)

== Sources ==
- Chapman, Don. Oxford Playhouse: high and low drama in a university city, University of Hertfordshire Press (2009) ISBN 978-1-902806-86-0
- "Fagan, James Bernard" . Thom's Irish Who's Who . Dublin: Alexander Thom and Son Ltd. 1923. pp. 75-76 – via Wikisource.
