= John Murphy =

John Murphy may refer to:

== Arts and entertainment ==
- John Francis Murphy (1853–1921), American landscape painter
- John Murphy (fiddler) (1875–1955), Irish fiddle player
- John Cullen Murphy (1919–2004), American illustrator
- John Murphy (playwright) (1929–1998), Irish dramatist, author of The Country Boy
- John Murphy (musician) (1959–2015), Australian drummer and multi-instrument musician
- Kim Deal (a.k.a. Mrs. John Murphy, born 1961), American singer/songwriter
- John Murphy (composer) (born 1965), British composer of film scores
- John Murphy (voice actor) (fl. 2010s), English voice actor in The Little Prince
- John Murphy (fl. 2010s), fictional character in The 100
- John Murphy (fl. 2010s), fictional character in The Leftovers

== Business and industry ==
- John Murphy (bellfounder) (fl. 1837–1879), Irish bellfounder
- John H. Murphy Sr. (1841–1922), African-American newspaper publisher
- John Murphy (contractor) (1913–2009), British building contractor
- John H. Murphy III (1916–2010), American publisher and newspaper executive
- Joe Murphy (contractor) (John Murphy, 1917–2000), Irish civil engineering contractor
- John Murphy (engineer) (born 1943), American inventor and computer engineer, credited with inventing ARCNET
- John Murphy (branding consultant) (born 1946), British branding consultant, founder of Interbrand
- John D. Murphy (born 1946), American cofounder of the University of Phoenix
- John Murphy (technical analyst) (fl. 1960s–2000s), American financial market analyst

== Military ==
- John Murphy (priest) (1753–1798), Irish Roman Catholic priest and military leader in the Irish Rebellion of 1798
- John McLeod Murphy (1827–1871), U.S. Navy officer during the American Civil War
- John Murphy (Saint Patrick's Battalion) (fl. 1846–1848), Irish soldier
- John E. Murphy (1869–1941), US Navy sailor and Medal of Honor recipient during the Spanish–American War
- John Alphonsus Murphy (1881–1935), American Medal of Honor recipient

== Politics and law ==
=== Australia ===
- John Murphy (Queensland politician) (1820–1883), Australian politician, member of the Queensland Legislative Assembly
- John Murphy (New South Wales politician, born 1821) (1821–1883), Australian politician, member of the New South Wales Legislative Assembly
- John Murphy (Australian politician, born 1950), Australian politician, member of the House of Representatives

=== Canada ===
- John Joseph Murphy (Newfoundland MHA) (1849–1938), Canadian politician, member of the Newfoundland House of Assembly
- John Joseph Murphy (1922–2010), Canadian politician, mayor of St. John's, Newfoundland
- John Murphy (Canadian politician, born 1937) (1937–2024), Canadian politician, member of the Canadian House of Commons

=== U.S. ===
- John Murphy (Alabama politician) (1786–1841), American politician, governor of Alabama
- John Murphy (Nebraska politician) (1918–2010), American politician from Nebraska
- John Murphy (Texas politician) (born 1945), American politician, mayor pro tem of Richardson, Texas
- John E. Murphy (judge) (1900–1994), American judge and politician from Massachusetts
- John E. Murphy Jr. (born 1943), American lobbyist and politician from Massachusetts
- John Ellsworth Murphy (1925–1984), American lawyer and judge in Omaha, Nebraska
- John F. Murphy (JAG) (fl. 2000s), American lawyer, chief prosecutor of the Guantanamo Military Commissions
- John F. Murphy (South Dakota politician) (1930–2003), American lawyer and politician from South Dakota
- John F. Murphy Sr. (1923–2011), American politician from Vermont
- John L. V. Murphy (1878–1933), American politician from Maryland
- John Luttrell Murphy (1842–1912), American jurist, justice of the Territorial Montana Supreme Court
- John M. Murphy (California politician, born 1862) (1862–?), Irish-born California state assemblyman
- John M. Murphy (New York politician) (1926–2015), US congressman from New York, implicated in Abscam
- John Marion Murphy (1824–1892) Canadian-born American rancher, businessperson, politician, and an early settler in California
- John R. Murphy (1856–1932), American politician and attorney in Massachusetts
- John W. Murphy (Connecticut politician) (1878–1963), American politician, mayor of New Haven, Connecticut
- John W. Murphy (Pennsylvania politician) (1902–1962), American congressman from Pennsylvania
- John W. Murphy (Arizona politician) (1874–1947), American lawyer and attorney general of Arizona

=== Elsewhere ===
- John Murphy (Irish Parliamentary Party politician) (1870–1930), Irish politician, member of the UK Parliament for East Kerry
- Jack Murphy (Irish politician) (1920–1984), TD Dublin South Central
- John A. Murphy (1927–2022), Irish historian and senator from Cork

== Religion ==
- John Murphy (priest) (1753–1798), Irish Roman Catholic priest and military leader in the Irish Rebellion of 1798
- John James Murphy (1796–1883), Irish Roman Catholic priest
- John Tuohill Murphy (1854–1926), Irish Roman Catholic priest
- John Murphy (archbishop of Cardiff) (1905–1995), English Roman Catholic archbishop
- John Murphy (bishop of Cork) (1772–1847), Irish Roman Catholic bishop

== Sports ==
=== Association football (soccer) ===
- John Murphy (footballer, born 1872) (1872–1924), English footballer
- John Murphy (footballer, born 1886), Irish footballer for Bradford and Luton
- John Murphy (footballer, born 1894) (1894–1921), Scottish footballer with Hamilton Academical, Bury, Rotherham County
- John Murphy (footballer, born 1898), Scottish footballer for Heart of Midlothian and Kilmarnock
- John Murphy (1900s footballer), English footballer for Stoke and Bradford
- Basher Murphy (born 1935), Scottish footballer and ice hockey player
- John Murphy (footballer, born 1942) (1942–2020), Scottish footballer
- John Murphy (footballer, born 1976), English footballer
- John Murphy (soccer, born 2000), American soccer player
- John Murphy (soccer, born 1967) (born 1967), American soccer coach

=== Australian rules football ===
- Johnny Murphy (footballer, born 1879) (1879–1950)
- John P. Murphy (born 1945), at South Melbourne and Sturt
- John Murphy (Australian rules footballer) (born 1949), for the Fitzroy Football Club

=== Baseball ===
- John Murphy (pitcher) (1858–1905), American baseball pitcher
- John Murphy (infielder) (1879–1949), American baseball infielder
- Johnny Murphy (1908–1970), American baseball pitcher
- John Ryan Murphy (born 1991), American baseball catcher

=== Other sports ===
- John Murphy (Cork hurler) (fl. 1880s–1890s), Irish hurler
- John Murphy (Offaly hurler) (born 1999), Irish hurler
- Johnny Murphy (coach) (1891–1961), American basketball player-coach for the Rochester Centrals
- John Murphy (high jumper) (1895–1972), American high jumper
- John Murphy (sport shooter) (1919–1997), Australian Olympic shooter
- John Murphy (basketball) (1924–2003), American basketball player
- John Murphy (Derry Gaelic footballer) (1925/1926–2009), Irish Gaelic footballer
- Jack Murphy (American football) (John A. Murphy, c. 1932–2021), American college football coach for the Toledo Rockets
- John Murphy (Down Gaelic footballer) (1948–2020) Irish Gaelic footballer, manager, coach and selector
- John Murphy (swimmer) (born 1953), American Olympic gold medal swimmer
- Johnny Murphy (hurler) (born 1954), Irish hurler
- John Murphy (sportscaster) (born 1955), American football announcer for the Buffalo Bills
- John Murphy (cyclist) (born 1984), American cyclist
- Johne Murphy (born 1984), Irish rugby union player
- Jonny Murphy (born 1992), Irish rugby union player
- John Murphy (rugby union, born 1957), Irish rugby union player
- John Murphy (rugby union, born 1963), Irish rugby union player

== Others ==
- John Benjamin Murphy (1857–1916), American surgeon, president of the American Medical Association
- John Murphy (sanatorium operator) (1912–1977), American professional wrestler and sanatorium operator, nicknamed "Dropkick" and namesake of the band Dropkick Murphys
- John Murphy (loyalist) (1950–1998), from Belfast, Northern Ireland
- John Murphy, architect in Australia; see John and Phyllis Murphy
- John F. Murphy (law professor) (1937–2021), American law professor at Villanova University

== See also ==
- Jack Murphy (disambiguation)
- Jon Murphy (disambiguation)
