= John F. Murphy =

John F. Murphy may refer to:

- John F. Murphy (law professor) (born 1937), law professor who has written on counter-terrorism and the Guantanamo military commissions
- John F. Murphy (JAG), naval officer appointed as the fifth Chief Prosecutor of the Guantanamo military commissions
- John F. Murphy Sr. (1923–2011), American politician from Vermont
- John F. Murphy (South Dakota politician) (1930–2003), American lawyer and politician from South Dakota
- John Frank Murphy (born 1977), American federal judge

== See also ==
- John Murphy (disambiguation)
