= Jack Murphy =

Jack Murphy may refer to:

== Politics ==
- Jack Murphy (Irish politician) (1920–1984), Irish republican and independent politician
- Jack M. Murphy (1925–1984), lieutenant governor of Idaho
- Jack Murphy (Communist) (1888–1965), British Communist Party foundation member
- Jack Murphy (Georgia politician), state senator from Georgia (U.S. state)
- Jack Murphy (Florida politician) (1926–1989), member of the Florida House of Representatives
- Jack Murphy (podcaster), American political commentator

== Sports ==
- Jack Murphy (footballer) (1918–2002), Australian rules footballer
- Jack Murphy (sportswriter) (1923–1980), American sportswriter
  - Jack Murphy Stadium a former stadium in San Diego, California, which was named for the sportswriter and later changed names
- Jack Murphy (American football) (1932–2021), American football player and coach
- Jack Murphy (basketball) (born 1979), American basketball coach
- Jack Murphy (baseball) (born 1988), American baseball player
- Jack Murphy (rugby league) (born 1992), English rugby league player
- Jack Murphy (rugby union), Irish rugby union player
- Jack Murphy (cricketer) (born 1995), Welsh cricketer
- Jack Murphy (lacrosse), American lacrosse player
- Jack Murphy (racing driver) (1927–2013), American racing driver
- Jackie Murphy (1949–1970), Scottish football player (Notts County)

== Others ==
- Jack Roland Murphy (1937–2020), aka Murph the Surf, American convicted robber and murderer
- Jack Murphy (writer), musical lyricist and composer
- Jack Murphy (choreographer), choreographer and movement director
- Jack Murphy Clothing, Irish retail chain

== See also ==
- John Murphy (disambiguation)
