= David Damrosch =

American literary historian

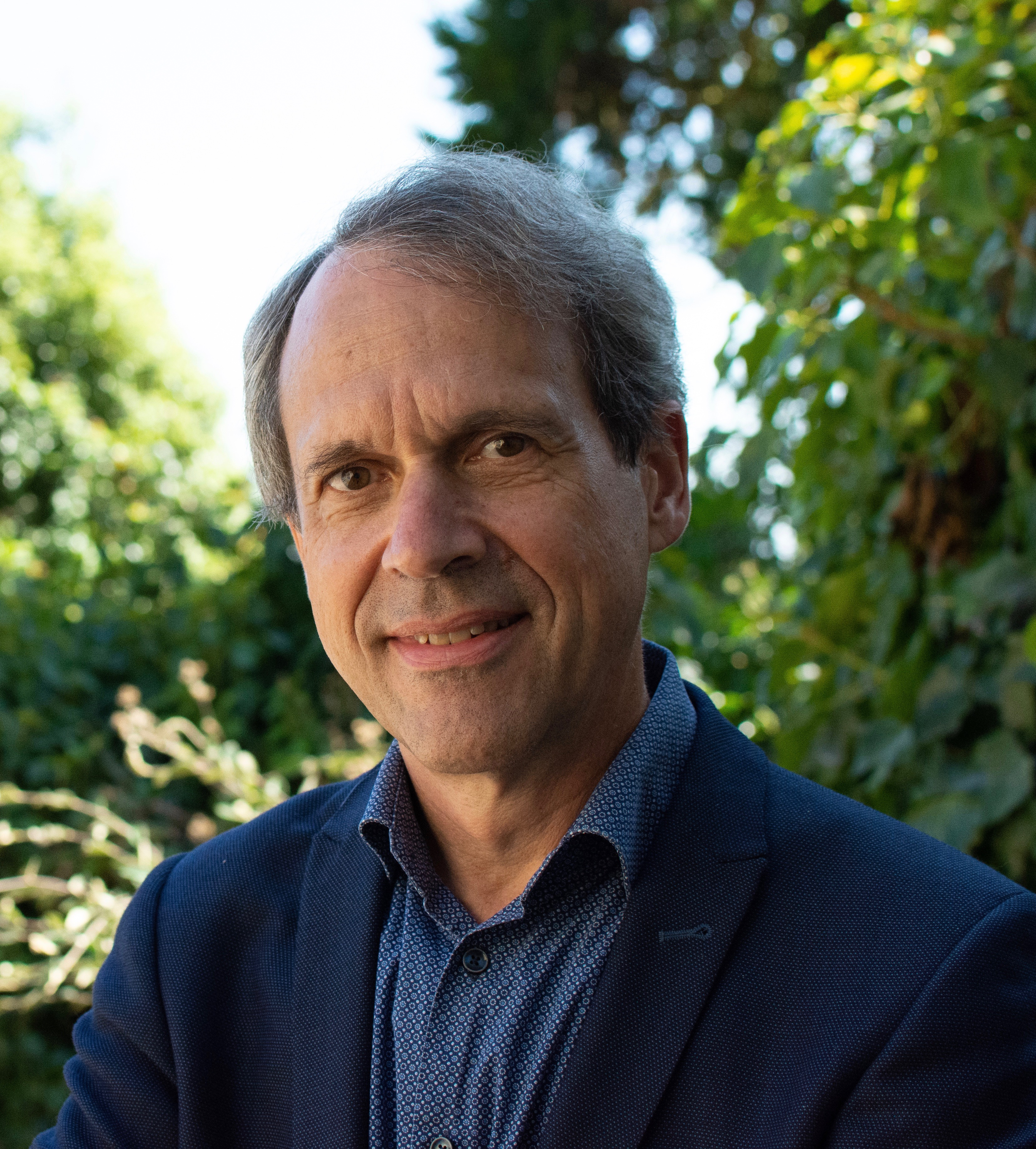
- Born: 13 April 1953 (age 73); Maine, United States of America
- Occupations: literary scholar, professor
- Awards: Balzan Prize (2023)

Academic background
- Education: Yale University
- Thesis: Scripture and Fiction: Egypt, the Midrash, "Finnegans Wake"

Academic work
- Discipline: comparative literature and world literature
- Notable ideas: world literature

David Damrosch (born 13 April 1953) is an American literary historian, author, and scholar of comparative and world literature, and is the Ernest Bernbaum Professor of Comparative Literature at Harvard University. He is the author of nine books and editor or co-editor of two dozen collections, and is best known for his book What is World Literature? (2003), in which he defines world literature not as a set canon of texts but as “a mode of reading”, highlighting ways in which texts get circulated and translated. His further publications on this topic include How to Read World Literature? (2009), Comparing the Literatures (2020), and Around the World in 80 Books (2021). Among the collections Damrosch co-edited are the six-volume Longman anthologies of British Literature and World Literature. He is a co-editor in chief of the Journal of World Literature. His edition and translation of a francophone Congolese novel, Georges Ngal’s Giambatista Viko; or, The Rape of African Discourse, came out in 2022.

Damrosch is a past president of the American Comparative Literature Association (2001-2003) and is a Fellow of the American Academy of Arts and Sciences and a member of Academia Europaea. In 2023 he was awarded the Balzan Prize for his work on world literature. He gave the Tanner Lectures on Human Values at the University of Utah in 2025.

== Education and career ==
Damrosch was born in Maine and raised there and in New York City. He studied at Yale University, earning his BA in 1975 and his PhD in 1980, with a dissertation titled “Scripture and Fiction: Egypt, the Midrash, Finnegans Wake.” At Yale he developed interests in a wide range of ancient and modern languages and literatures, including Egyptian hieroglyphics, Biblical Hebrew, Nahuatl, and Old Norse. As he recalls in an interview with Harvard Magazine, such an academic profile was unusual for a comparatist in the 1970s. When asked about his research area in 2015, he said: “I work mostly on literature between roughly 2000 and 2015. But ‘2000’ means 2000 B.C.E.”

At Columbia (1980–2008) and at Harvard since then, he has taught courses on ancient and modern literature and on theories and methods of comparative studies. He was the Chair of the Department of Comparative Literature at Harvard from 2009 to 2022. He has given talks in more than fifty countries around the world, and his work has been translated into Albanian, Arabic, Chinese, Danish, Estonian, French, German, Hungarian, Japanese, Korean, Persian, Polish, Romanian, Spanish, Turkish, Tibetan, Vietnamese, and Yiddish.

== Work ==
Damrosch has described his approach as that of “a structuralist in recovery,” balancing an interest in literary forms with a more contextually grounded analysis. He has always been preoccupied with questions of methodology and institutional practices. In We Scholars (1995), he calls for reforms in academia to combat alienation and foster new modes of scholarly interaction. He further explored these ideas in his novel Meetings of the Mind (2000), which he defines as “an autobiographical survey of comparative studies,” and implemented them in his role as the President of the ACLA. This experience informs his later works.

Damrosch’s thinking has been shaped by the ideas of Leo Spitzer, Erich Auerbach, Northrop Frye, and Kenneth Burke, on whom he has written extensively.

=== World Literature ===
Alongside Pascale Casanova’s La République mondiale des lettres (1999) and Franco Moretti’s essay “Conjunctions on World Literature” (2000), Damrosch’s What is World Literature? is considered a foundational text in the contemporary study of world literature. He draws on Goethe’s concept of Weltliteratur, rethinking it in light of increasing globalization and evolving academic politics. In this study, he defines world literature as:

1) an elliptical refraction of national literatures.

2) writing that gains in translation.

3) a mode of reading: a form of detached engagement with worlds beyond our own place and time.

Damrosch sees translation as a key tool for intercultural dialogue and emphasizes the role of the reader in this process. This view has been widely cited, receiving both endorsement and criticism. Galin Tihanov writes that “Damrosch has implicitly confronted the tension between the singularity and multiplicity of language by concluding that studying a literary work in the languages of its socialization is more important than studying it in the language of its production, not least because this new priority restricts and undermines the monopoly of methodological nationalism in literary studies.” In Against World Literature, Emily Apter critiques market-driven notions of readability and easy circulation, focusing on the politics of the “Untranslatable.” The Warwick Research Collective employs a Marxist framework to challenge Damrosch’s historical perspective and argue that world literature is “a creature of modernity.” In Comparing the Literatures, Damrosch both responds to these objections and revisits some of his earlier claims, pointing to their “theoretical monism.” Alexander Beecroft calls Comparing the Literatures “a review and updating of Damrosch’s previous writing on world literature,” while Delia Ungureanu notes its strong ties to the first decade of the Institute for World Literature. Damrosch’s ideas are discussed at length in “David Damrosch’s Comparative World Literatures,” a special issue of the Journal of World Literature (2024), edited by B. Venkat Mani.

=== The Institute for World Literature ===
After coming to Harvard, in 2010 Damrosch founded The Institute for World Literature, a monthlong summer program devoted to the study of literature in a global context. According to Damrosch, the IWL is meant to encourage “engagement amid diversity.” It has held sessions at Harvard and at universities around the world, including in Beijing, Istanbul, Lisbon, Copenhagen, Tokyo, Mainz, and Cyprus. As of 2024, the IWL counted “some 1,500 alumni from about 40 countries.” In their testimonies, the participants have repeatedly underscored the sense of community and the impact of the IWL on their lives. The activity of the IWL led to the establishment of The Journal of World Literature in 2016. With the award Damrosch received from the Balzan Foundation in 2023, the IWL launched the Balzan Colloquium. Each summer from 2024 to 2028, it is providing full financial support to a group of ten promising scholars from Africa, Eastern Europe, Latin America, the Middle East, and South/Southeast Asia.

=== Audience ===
Damrosch has championed “engagement with a more public kind of writing and not just scholarship.” He was the lead advisor and a key commentator for Invitation to World Literature, a multimedia project founded by Annenberg Media, in which authors, scholars, and translators introduced important works from various literary traditions. As of 2025, more than 400,000 people have taken his online course, co-taught with his colleague Martin Puchner, “Masterpieces of World Literature.” He has written two books for general readers, The Buried Book: The Loss and Rediscovery of the Epic of Gilgamesh (2007) and Around the World in 80 Books (2021). The latter started as an online project during the COVID-19 pandemic.

== Personal life ==
Damrosch comes from a prominent American family of musicians and artists. His great-great-grandfather was the conductor Leopold Damrosch, while his great-grandfather Frank Damrosch founded the precursor to Juilliard. A great-aunt was the artist Helen Damrosch Tee-Van, who had a major influence on him. His elder brother is the literary historian and biographer Leo Damrosch.

In 1974 Damrosch married Lori Fisler Damrosch, the Hamilton Fish Professor of International Law and Diplomacy at Columbia Law School, whom he met in college. They have three children.

In Comparing the Literatures, Damrosch writes:

My own perspective is that of someone raised and teaching in the United States, though also with an awareness of German Jewish immigrant roots, and with parents who recalled their early days in the Philippines, where they met. I am a liberal humanist by outlook, struggling as many of us are to make sense of an increasingly illiberal world.

== Bibliography ==
=== Books ===
Damrosch, David (2025). Hābādo daigaku: Nihon bungaku o sekai ni hiraku [Lectures on World Literature: Opening Japanese Literature to the World]. Trans. Mitsuyoshi Numano et al. Tokyo: University of Tokyo Press.

––– (2023). Around the World in 80 Books. New York: Penguin, and London: Pelican. Online version posted May–August, 2020, at https://80books.hsites.harvard.edu/.

––– (2020). Comparing the Literatures: Literary Studies in a Global Age. Princeton and Oxford: Princeton University Press.

––– (2009). How To Read World Literature. Oxford: Wiley-Blackwell. Expanded second ed., 2018.

––– (2006). The Buried Book: The Loss and Rediscovery of the Great Epic of Gilgamesh. New York: Henry Holt and Company.

––– (2003). What Is World Literature? Princeton and Oxford: Princeton University Press.

––– (2000). Meetings of the Mind. Princeton and Oxford: Princeton University Press.

––– (1995). We Scholars: Changing the Culture of the University. Cambridge, MA: Harvard University Press.

––– (1987). The Narrative Covenant: Transformations of Genre in the Growth of Biblical Literature. San Francisco: Harper & Row. Paperback edition from Cornell University Press.

=== Selected Anthologies and Edited Volumes ===
Damrosch, David, ed. (2025). World Literature in and for Pandemic Times. Leiden: Brill.

––– with Tiwari, Bhavya, eds. (2023). World Literature and Postcolonial Studies. Leiden: Brill.

––– ed. and trans. (2022). Giambatista Viko; ou, Le viol du discours africain, and Giambatista Viko; or, The Rape of African Discourse by Georges Ngal. MLA Texts and Translations Series. New York: Modern Language Association, 2 vols.

––– with Moberg, Bergur Rønne, eds. (2022) Ultraminor World Literatures. Leiden: Brill.

––– with Türkkan, Sevinç, eds. (2017). Approaches to Teaching the Works of Orhan Pamuk. New York: Modern Language Association.

––– with D’haen, Theo; Kadir, Djelal, eds. (2012). The Routledge Companion to World Literature. Routledge.

––– with Melas, Natalie; Buthelezi, Mbongiseni, eds. (2009). The Princeton Sourcebook in Comparative Literature: From the European Enlightenment to the Global Present. Princeton and Oxford: Princeton University Press.

––– ed. (2009). Teaching World Literature. New York: Modern Language Association.

––– ed. (2004, 2008). The Longman Anthology of World Literature. New York: Longman.

––– ed. (1999, fourth ed. 2009). The Longman Anthology of British Literature. New York: Longman.

=== Selected Articles ===
Damrosch, David (2024). “Our Markets, Our Selves.” Journal of World Literature, 9:3, 446–60.

––– (2023). “Epic Traditions in Balkan World Literature.” Neohelicon 50, pp. 459–75.

––– (2023). “Locations of Comparison: The Personal and the Political.” Dibur 12, pp. 1–9.

––– (2021). “Page, Stage, Location: The Work in the World.” Journal of World Literature 6:3, 297-313. Repr. in Michael Wood and Delia Ungureanu, eds. (2025), The Artistic Object and Its Worlds: Literature and Cinema. Leiden: Brill, pp. 53–69.

––– (2016). “Antiquity.” In Hayot, Eric, and Walkowitz, Rebecca L., eds., A New Vocabulary for Global Modernism. New York: Columbia University Press, pp. 43–58.

––– (2007). “Scriptworlds: Writing Systems and the Formation of World Literature.” Modern Language Quarterly 68:2, pp. 195–219.

––– (1995). “Auerbach in Exile.” Comparative Literature 47:2, pp. 97–117.

=== Interviews and Talks ===
Damrosch, David (2025). “A Rune of One’s Own: Writing Systems and Cultural Memory.” Tanner Lecture on Human Values, University of Utah.

––– (2025). “Language Wars: Scriptworlds in Collision.” Tanner Lecture on Human Values Symposium, University of Utah.

––– in Podcast “Muslim Footprints” (2024). “Tales from Muslim Lands” with Professor David Damrosch.

––– (2023). “From Dante to Coatlicue: World Literature and Cultural Memory.” Balzan Prizewinners Interdisciplinary Forum, Bern.

––– (July 4, 2022). “Born Global: Transcontinental Literature and Film, from Apulius to Ang Lee.” The Institute for World Literature, Mainz.

––– with Martin Puchner (2021). Conversation on Around the World in 80 Books.

––– with Katharina Natalia Piechocki (2019). “Spitzer’s Rabelais.”

––– in conversation with Pheng Cheah (2018). The Institute for World Literature, Tokyo.

––– (2016). “What Isn’t World Literature? Problems of Language, Context, and Politics.” The Institute for World Literature, Harvard University.

––– (2016). “What is ‘Literature’?: Comparing the Incomparable in World Literary Studies,” Thammasat University (Part I & Part II).
