= Intel Ireland =

Irish regional subsidiary of Intel

- Main entrance of Intel's Leixlip campus
- Type: Subsidiary
- Industry: Semiconductors; Computer hardware; Autonomous cars; Automation; Artificial intelligence
- Founded: 29 September 1989; 36 years ago
- Founders: Gordon Moore; Robert Noyce
- Headquarters: Collinstown Industrial Park, Leixlip, Kildare, Ireland
- Area served: Europe
- Key people: Eamonn Sinnott (GM)
- Products: Central processing units; Microprocessors; Integrated graphics processing units (iGPUs); Graphics processing units; System on a chips (SoCs); Motherboard chipsets; Network interface controllers; Modems; Solid-state drives; Wi-Fi and Bluetooth chipsets; Flash memory; Vehicle automation sensors
- Number of employees: 4,900 (2024)
- Parent: Intel
- Website: intel.ie

Intel Ireland is the Irish subsidiary of the U.S.-based semiconductor giant, Intel. Founded in 1989, the company is one of the largest employers in Ireland.

== History ==
=== Origins ===
In the late 1980s, Intel was in talks with IDA Ireland about potentially setting up its European manufacturing operations in Ireland, with other possibilities being Scotland and the Netherlands. By September 1989, Intel had reached an agreement with IDA worth £87 million in grants to set up in Ireland. The subsidiary was registered on 29 September 1989 as Intel Ireland Limited.

=== Leixlip campus ===
Intel founder Gordon Moore came to Dublin to announce the 2,200 job project setting up in Ireland on 3 October. SIPTU were also in talks with the company regarding finalising an exclusive union membership deal. On 5 October, Intel submitted an application to Kildare County Council for full planning permission for the development of an “Electronic Systems Manufacturing and Assembly Industry” at the Collinstown Industrial Park in Leixlip, County Kildare.

Intel began hiring employees in early November and officially began operations on 24 November at their temporary premises in Palmerstown.

In January 1990, Intel were certain that they were going to go ahead with its $250 million plan of creating a manufacturing facility, including a fabrication plant, at the planned industrial park site in Leixlip. The foundation stone ceremony was held on 25 January 1990 at the nearby Castletown House.

By June, they were going forward with the second phase of the construction following the acceptance of its newest computer products in the European market. Construction on the Fab 10 fabrication plant later began in 1991.

Jacobs International Limited, the Irish subsidiary of U.S.-based Jacobs Solutions, were awarded a £100 million contract with Intel to provide architectural, engineering, procurement and construction services at the Leixlip site in April 1991.

On 11 March 1992, Intel signed a deal with Amstrad in Hanover to manufacture a range of Amstrad's machines due to financial difficulties Amstrad experienced due to the recession. It was felt that this deal would be another boost for Intel's facility in Leixlip.

The manufacturing plant manufactured its first chip in 1993. By October 1993, the company had a total of 1,000 employees and 2,000 by November 1994.

=== Intel Shannon ===
In 2000, Intel opened Intel Shannon, a research and development (R&D) facility in Shannon, County Clare, which employs approximately 250 people. In September 2024, it was announced that the Intel Shannon facility would be closing in late 2025 with the base moving to the main facility in Leixlip.

== Fabrication plants ==
The campus at Leixlip is Intel's largest manufacturing plant outside of the United States and initially consisted of two semi-conductor wafer fabrication facilities: Fab 10 Ireland Fab Operations (IFO) and also the Fab 24 manufacturing plant which includes Fab 24-2. IFO was a 200mm wafer facility whilst Fab 24 processes 300mm wafers using 65-nanometer and 90-nanometer process technologies. IFO ceased operations and Fab 10 is now classed as Fab 24, along with Fab 14.

=== Fab 10 (IFO) ===
Fab 10 began construction in 1991, and was opened in February 1994 following a total investment of £500 million since commencing operations in 1989. By August 2010, Intel Fab Operations (IFO) had become the first Intel plant to ship 2 billion die. It is also notable as the only Intel facility to achieve the ISO 14001 safety standard for its management of the local environment.

=== Fab 14 ===
Construction for Fab 14 began in October 1995 with the construction contract being won by Joseph Murphy Structural Engineers Ltd (JMSE). In June 1997, Intel sought planning permission for “a two-storey over basement wafer fabrication production extension with roof mounted equipment to existing Fab 14 complex”. In April 1998, Intel received the Forbairt Construction Linkage Award for its extensive use of Irish suppliers as 65% of all goods and services used to design, build and furnish Fab 14 were Irish. Fab 14 officially opened on 11 May 1998.

=== Fab 24 and 24-2 ===
Fab 24 was officially opened in June 2004 by then Taoiseach Bertie Ahern, and the new facility represented an investment of $2 billion. In April 2005, Intel announced that the one-billionth microchip had been manufactured by the Leixlip-based operation after 12 years in business. Fab 24-2 was opened in June 2006 and was Intel's first plant in Europe to use the then advanced 65nm process technology.

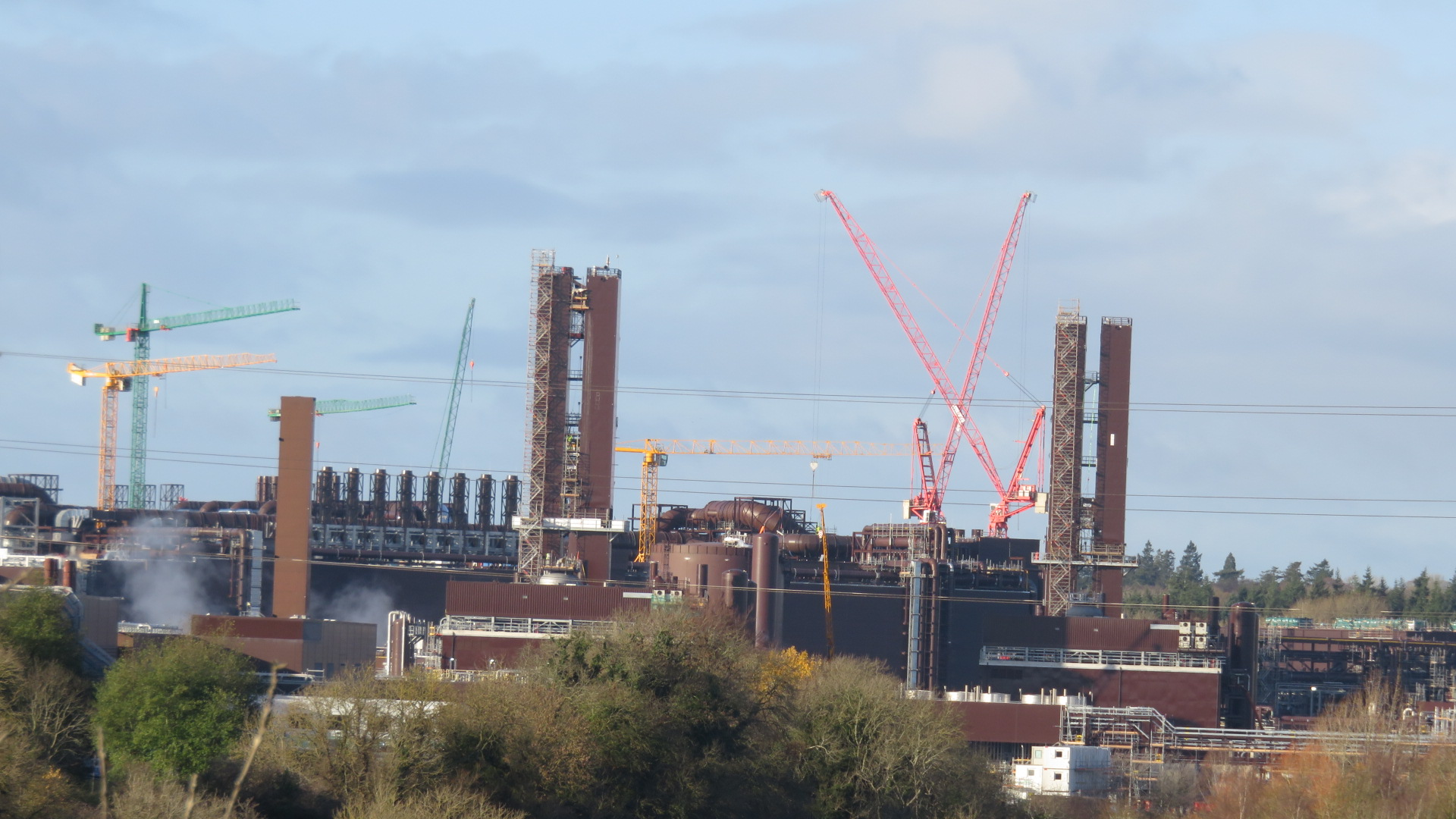
Construction of Fab 34 in December 2021

=== Fab 34 ===
In 2019, work began on Fab 34 which was key to doubling the company's manufacturing space in Ireland and making the way for the production of Intel's 4 process technology. Fab 34 officially opened on 29 September 2023 at a total cost of €17 billion. In June 2024, Intel announced the $11.2 billion sale of a 49% stake in a joint venture related to Fab 34 with Apollo Global Management. In April 2026, Intel announced an agreement to repurchase the 49% stake from Apollo for $14.2 billion.
