= Jonathan Murphy =

Jonathan Murphy may refer to:

- Jonathan Murphy (actor) (born 1981, American actor
- Jonathan Murphy (police officer) (born 1958), English police officer
- Jonathan Murphy, translator of The Black Book of Communism

== See also ==
- Jon Murphy (disambiguation)
- John Murphy (disambiguation)
