= Alona E. Evans =

Alona E. Evans (February 27, 1917 – September 23, 1980) was an American scholar who specialized in international law and was one of the first American academics to write extensively on legal issues related to international terrorists, fugitives and refugees. Evans was a professor in and the chair of the Department of Political Science at Wellesley College, Wellesley, Massachusetts, and was the first woman to be president of the American Society of International Law.

== Early life ==
Evans was born Alona Elizabeth Evans on February 27, 1917, in Providence, Rhode Island. She was the daughter of Robert Richard Evans and Florence Elizabeth Whitehead. Her father, an immigrant from Wales, was an investigator for the Internal Revenue Service when he was killed at age 54 by a drunk driver while on duty in North Carolina in 1941. Evans received a B.A. (1940, magna cum laude) and a PhD (1945) from Duke University, Durham, North Carolina. She served with the U.S. Department of War and the U.S. Department of State during World War II (1942-1943).

== Wellesley College ==
Evans was a member of the faculty of the Wellesley College Department of Political Science from 1945 until her death in 1980. She became a professor in 1958 and was chair of the department from 1959-1970 and 1972-1973. Evans taught courses such as introductory international law, international criminal law and the American criminal justice system. She served as the college pre-law advisor and adviser to the Wellesley Law Club.

== International law societies ==
Evans was a member of the American Society of International Law from 1943 until her death in 1980. She was judicial decisions editor for the society’s publication, the American Journal of International Law, from 1966 until 1976, the first woman to serve on that journal's board of editors. She was vice president of the society from 1976-1979 and president in 1980, again the first woman to hold these positions in the history of the society. When she died in 1980, Evans had just begun her term as president of ASIL. Evans was also a member of the executive committee of the International Law Association (London) and chair of its Committee on International Terrorism (1973-1980).

== Other activities and recognition ==
Evans was a member of the board of directors of the American Association of University Women from 1963-1967 and received the AAUW Achievement Award in 1971 in recognition of her accomplishments in international law.

Evans was listed in many editions of Who’s Who in America and Who’s Who of American Women. In 1980 she was the recipient of the Wolfgang Friedman Memorial Award given annually by the Columbia Journal of Transnational Law for outstanding contributions in the field of international law.

== Publications ==
Evans was the author of numerous articles on international law in journals such as the American Journal of International Law, International Law Reports, International Lawyer, and the British Yearbook of International Law. She was also co-editor (with John F. Murphy) and a contributor to Legal Aspects of International Terrorism (Lexington, Mass: D.C. Heath & Co.,1978). ISBN 978-0-669-02185-1 The content of this book was initially prepared for the U.S Department of State under the auspices of the American Society of International Law.

== Death ==
Evans died of congestive heart failure at age 63 on September 23, 1980 in Newton, Massachusetts. Evans provided that her estate be used to endow student prizes for excellence in international law, including at Duke University, her alma mater.

== Archives ==
Evans' professional papers (1935 to 1980) are held in the Wellesley College Archives.
