= Jon Murphy =

Jon Murphy may refer to:

- Sir Jon Murphy (police officer) (born 1958), British police officer, Chief Constable of Merseyside
- Jon Murphy (fighter) (born 1977), American mixed martial arts fighter

== See also ==
- Jonathan Murphy (disambiguation)
- John Murphy (disambiguation)
