= Lori Fisler Damrosch =

- Born: 1953 (age 72–73)
- Education: Yale University (BA, JD)
- Title: Hamilton Fish Professor of International Law and Diplomacy at Columbia Law School.
- Spouse: David Damrosch

Lori Fisler Damrosch is an American legal scholar of public international law and U.S. law of foreign relations. She is currently the Hamilton Fish Professor of International Law and Diplomacy at Columbia Law School.

== Career ==
After graduating from Yale College in 1973 and Yale Law School in 1976, Damrosch clerked for Judge Jon O. Newman at the U.S. District Court, District of Connecticut. From 1977 to 1981, she worked at the Office of the Legal Advisor at the U.S. Department of State. From 1981 to 1984, Damrosch was an associate at the New York office of Sullivan & Cromwell. In 1984, Damrosch joined the faculty of Columbia Law School.

== Honors and awards ==
- Wolfgang Friedmann Award, Columbia Journal of Transnational Law, 2015
- Certificate of Merit, American society of International Law, 1988
- Francis Deák Prize, American Journal of International law, 1981
- Superior Honow Award, U.S. Department of State, 1980
