= H. M. Posnett =

New Zealand literary academic (1855–1927)

Hutcheson Macaulay Posnett (c. 1855 – 1927) was an Irish-New Zealand lawyer and scholar who was a pioneer in the field of comparative literature.

Posnett was born in Dublin, Ireland. He graduated from Trinity College in that city.

From 1885 until 1890 Posnett held the Chair of Classics and English Literature at the University of Auckland although he also examined students in economics. His works include The Historical Method in Ethics, Jurisprudence, and Political Economy (1882) and The Ricardian Theory of Rent (1884), but he is most notable for the 1886 Comparative Literature, "considered today by many scholars as the foundational work for the studies gathered under the same name during the following century".

Informed by Herbert Spencer and Social Darwinism and published as part of the "International Scientific Series" (published by Kegan Paul, London and D. Appleton, New York), it explained the history of literature as occurring contemporaneously with social evolution, from simple and communal to individual and complex. Posnett's work was also much influenced by Johann Wolfgang von Goethe's concept of Weltliteratur ("world literature"). Apart from Matthew Arnold's use of the phrase "comparative literature" in a letter, Posnett was the first scholar to use it in the English-speaking world.

At the time of its publication, the Saturday Review stated "We find very little interest in Mr. Posnett's 'Comparative Literature.' The arrangement seems by no means well ordered. Heaps of information (not always correct) are 'shot' (like rubbish) all over the place. ... How remote all this is from the study of literature!"

In 1890 Posnett resigned and returned to Dublin where he practised as a lawyer.

Posnett died on 5 September 1927 in Kingstown, Ireland, with English probate being executed on 5 December of that same year.
