= Lawrence Morris =

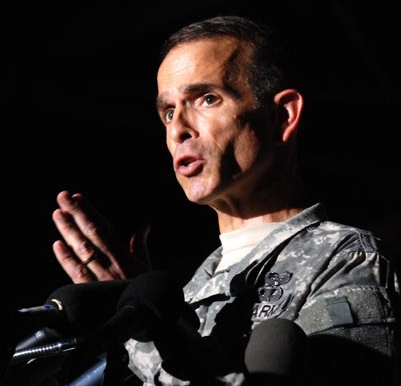
Morris addressing the press on June 5, 2008

Attorney Lawrence J. Morris is the chief of staff and counselor to the president at The Catholic University of America and a retired United States Army colonel.

== Academic career ==
Morris graduated from Marquette University's law school in 1982. Morris had previously earned a double major at Marquette in Political Science and Journalism.

In 1997 Lieutenant Colonel Morris served as the head of the Criminal Law department of the U.S. Army The Judge Advocate General's Legal Center and School, which has full American Bar Association accreditation for its post-juris-doctoral graduate course that confers a Master of Laws degree (or LLM) to its graduates. Like nearly all of his peers who are field grade Army officers on active duty as a judge advocate, Col. Morris holds an LLM in Military Law awarded by the Judge Advocate General's Legal Center and School on the campus of the University of Virginia.

Morris also studied at the Industrial College of the Armed Forces, where he earned a Master of Science in National Security Strategy.

Morris has worked as an adjunct professor at several law schools, including the Catholic University School of Law. He is the author of Military Justice: A Guide to the Issues, a capstone book published in 2010, as well as articles and training publications frequently used by US military prosecutors and defenders.

== Military career ==
During 2005-2006 Morris served as the Staff Judge Advocate to the Superintendent of the United States Military Academy at West Point.

In early 2007 Morris was the Chief of the U.S. Army Trial Defense Service, where he was responsible for the work and professional training of all uniformed Army defense attorneys as they represented soldiers accused of crimes under the UCMJ. He also served as a co-founder of the Law and Order Task Force in Iraq and received a Bronze Star for his service.

In the fall of 2007 Colonel Morris replaced Colonel Morris Davis as Chief Prosecutor of the Guantanamo military commissions. Davis resigned after a public disagreement with Brigadier General Thomas W. Hartmann, the Chief Legal Advisor to the Convening Authority for the Office of Military Commissions. Davis had publicly called for Hartmann to resign.

In 2002, Morris was the head of the Army's criminal law branch and was tasked with planning the first prosecution of suspected 9/11 terrorists. According to the Wall Street Journal, back in 2002 "he proposed a high-profile public trial that would lay bare the scope of al Qaeda's alleged conspiracy while burnishing the ideals of American justice." His legal advice was disregarded by the Bush administration, which decided to interrogate terrorists in secret—perhaps to gain critical intelligence necessary—to prevent further attacks, rather than seek justice through high-profile trials. Morris was later asked to conduct the trials.

=== Comments on the testimony of the witness known as "OC-1" ===
The Toronto Star identified Morris as the Chief Prosecutor of the Guantanamo military commissions. Michelle Shephard of the Star quoted Morris's comments about the accidental release of unredacted testimony from a witness known as OC-1, prior to a hearing where the legality of Omar Khadr combatant status was to be considered.

Excerpts from OC-1's secret testimony seemed to contradict the Prosecution's earlier account that Khadr had been the sole survivor of an aerial bombardment that mortally wounded Green Beret Sergeant Christopher Speer. Morris commented:

We're confident that we'll prove the case beyond a reasonable doubt once we get to the courtroom. That document has been disclosed at least three times over the past couple of years to the defence so there was nothing new or surprising in it.

=== Announcement of new charges for Mohammed al Qahtani ===
On 18 November 2008 Morris announced that he was filing new charges against Mohammed al Qahtani. The Bush administration acknowledged subjecting Al Qahtani to 58 days of sleep deprivation and other extreme interrogation methods in the fall of 2002, when intelligence officials realized he had tried to travel to the United States in the months preceding al Qaeda's September 11 attacks. Morris's prosecution team had proposed charges against Al Qahtani to Susan Crawford in early 2008. Crawford, the convening authority of military commissions, has the final say over whether charges are confirmed. She dropped the charges against al Qahtani because his "treatment met the legal definition of torture".

During his only testimony that has been made public—his testimony before his 2006 Administrative Review Board hearing—Al Qahtani acknowledged confessing to extensive ties to al Qaeda, and the 9-11 hijacking plot, but he claimed all his confessions were from the two months he was being tortured, and he had recanted them at every opportunity since then.

When announcing the new charges, Morris stated that the new charges were based on "independent and reliable evidence". He stated: "His conduct is significant enough that he falls into the category of people who ought to be held accountable by being brought to trial."

== Retirement announcement ==
Andy Worthington reported on May 6, 2009, that Morris was retiring from active duty and would be replaced as Chief Prosecutor by John Murphy, a captain in the United States Naval Reserve. The retirement ceremony and party were held on Friday, June 12, 2009. Morris officially retired on September 1, 2009. After military retirement, Morris worked as a civilian attorney for the U.S. Army. He wrote an article for the United States Army Combined Arms Center's periodical Military Review in 2012: "An Asset Out of You and Me: Communicating What It Truly Means to be a Soldier."

== Catholic University of America ==
In 2011, Catholic University of America president John H. Garvey appointed Morris as the school's general counsel. On 1 January 2018, he was appointed chief of staff and counselor to the president of the university, and was succeeded as general counsel by Nancy Morrison, a professor at Notre Dame Law School.
