= World literature =

Circulation of literature beyond its country of origin

World literature is used to refer to the world's total national literature and the circulation of works into the wider world beyond their country of origin. In the past, it primarily referred to the masterpieces of Western European literature. However, world literature today is increasingly seen in an international context. Now, readers have access to a wide range of global works in various translations.

Many scholars assert that the circulation beyond its country of origin is what makes a work considered world literature. For example, David Damrosch states, "A work enters into world literature by a double process: first, by being read as literature; second, by circulating out into a broader world beyond its linguistic and cultural point of origin". Likewise, world literature scholar Venkat Mani believes that the "worlding" of literature is brought about by "information transfer" largely generated by developments in print culture. Because of the advent of the library, "Publishers and booksellers who print and sell affordable books, literate citizens who acquire these books, and public libraries that make these books available to those who cannot afford to buy them collectively play a very important role in the "making" of world literature".

== History ==
Johann Wolfgang Goethe used the concept of world literature in several of his essays in the early decades of the nineteenth century to describe the international circulation and reception of literary works in Europe, including works of non-Western origin. The concept achieved wide currency after his disciple Johann Peter Eckermann published a collection of conversations with Goethe in 1835. Goethe spoke with Eckermann about the excitement of reading Chinese novels and Persian and Serbian poetry as well as of his fascination with seeing how his own works were translated and discussed abroad, especially in France. He made a famous statement in January 1827, predicting that world literature would replace national literature as the major mode of literary creativity in the future:

I am more and more convinced that poetry is the universal possession of mankind, revealing itself everywhere and at all times in hundreds and hundreds of men. ... I therefore like to look about me in foreign nations, and advise everyone to do the same. National literature is now a rather unmeaning term; the epoch of world literature is at hand, and everyone must strive to hasten its approach.

Reflecting a fundamentally economic understanding of world literature as a process of trade and exchange, Karl Marx and Friedrich Engels used the term in their Communist Manifesto (1848) to describe the "cosmopolitan character" of bourgeois literary production, asserting that:

In place of the old wants, satisfied by the productions of the country, we find new wants, requiring for their satisfaction the products of distant lands and climates. ... And as in material, so also in intellectual production. The intellectual creations of individual nations become common property. National one-sidedness and narrow-mindedness become more and more impossible, and from the numerous national and local literatures, there arises a world literature.

Martin Puchner has stated that Goethe had a keen sense of world literature as driven by a new world market in literature. This market-based approach was sought by Marx and Engels in 1848 through their Manifesto document, which was published in four languages and distributed among several European countries, and has since become one of the most influential texts of the twentieth century. While Marx and Engels followed Goethe in viewing world literature as a modern or future phenomenon, the Irish scholar H. M. Posnett argued in 1886 that world literature first arose in ancient empires, such as the Roman Empire, long before the rise of modern national literature. Today, world literature is understood to encompass classical works from all periods, including contemporary literature that is written for a global audience.

In the postwar era, the study of comparative and world literature was revived in the United States. Comparative literature was seen at the graduate level while world literature was taught as a first-year general education class. The focus remained largely on the Greek and Roman classics and the literature of major, modern Western-European powers, but a combination of factors in the late 1980s and early 1990s led to greater access to the world. The end of the Cold War, the growing globalization of the world economy, and new waves of immigration led to several efforts to expand the study of world literature. This change is illustrated by the expansion of The Norton Anthology of World Masterpieces, whose first edition in 1956 featured only Western-European and North American works, to a new "expanded edition" in 1995 with non-Western selections. Major survey anthologies today, including those published by Longman, Bedford and Norton, showcase several hundred authors from dozens of countries.

== Contemporary understandings ==
The explosive growth in the range of cultures studied under the rubric of world literature has inspired a variety of theoretical attempts to define the field and to propose effective modes of research and teaching. In his 2003 book What Is World Literature? David Damrosch understands world literature to be less of a vast collection of works and more a matter of circulation and reception. He proposed that works that thrive as world literature are ones that work well and even gain meaning through translation. Whereas Damrosch's approach remains tied to the close reading of individual works, a different view was taken by the Stanford critic Franco Moretti in a pair of articles offering "Conjectures on World Literature". Moretti believes that the scale of world literature exceeds what can be grasped by traditional methods of close reading, and advocates instead a mode of "distant reading" that would look at large-scale patterns as discerned from publication records and national literary histories.

Moretti's approach combined elements of evolutionary theory with the world-systems analysis pioneered by Immanuel Wallerstein, an approach further discussed since then by Emily Apter in her influential book The Translation Zone. Related to their world-systems approach is the work of French critic Pascale Casanova, La République mondiale des lettres (1999). Drawing on the theories of cultural production developed by the sociologist Pierre Bourdieu, Casanova explores the ways in which the works of peripheral writers must circulate into metropolitan centers in order to achieve recognition as being world literature.

The field of world literature continues to generate debate. Some scholars argue that not all peripheral writers are interested in borrowing from metropolitan centers. Jing Tsu explores the ways in which Macanese poets "like Yiling openly revel in Macau's trivial status of a faded former colony that sits on the periphery of mainland China's periphery". Han Au Chua examines the works of Yu Dafu and argues that:

Yu’s works are composed out of transnational engagements, but the cosmopolitan references in his stories do not merely renounce national categories. Rather, these invocations of transnational literature – including nineteenth-century works from Russia, England, and fin-de-siècle European writers – in ‘Sinking’ and ‘Nights of Spring Fever’ complicate the espousal of cosmopolitanism. As a result, Yu’s works prove how foundational dimensions in the world literary space are less inclusive than generally assumed: the first being anachronistic borrowings from transnational loci as the means of competing for temporal consecration and aesthetic modernity, and the second, the supposition that translation helps peripheral writers surmount structural inequalities within the world literary space.

Other scholars emphasize that world literature can and should be studied with close attention to original languages and contexts, even as works take on new dimensions and new meanings abroad. Gayatri Chakravorty Spivak argues that too often the study of world literature in translation smooths out both the linguistic richness of the original and the political force a work can have in its original context.

World literature series are now being published in China and in Estonia, and a new Institute for World Literature, offering month-long summer sessions on theory and pedagogy, had its inaugural session at Peking University in 2011, with its next sessions at Istanbul Bilgi University in 2012 and at Harvard University in 2013. Since the middle of the first decade of the new century, a steady stream of works has provided materials for the study of the history of world literature and the current debates. Valuable collections of essays include:

- Manfred Schmeling, Weltliteratur Heute (1995)
- Christopher Prendergast, Debating World Literature (2004)
- David Damrosch, Teaching World Literature (2009)
- Theo D'haen's co-edited collections The Routledge Companion to World Literature (2011) and World Literature: A Reader (2012).

Individual studies include:

- Moretti, Maps, Graphs, Trees (2005)
- John Pizer, The Idea of World Literature (2006),
- Mads Rosendahl Thomsen, Mapping World Literature (2008)
- Theo D'haen, The Routledge Concise History of World Literature (2011)
- Tötösy de Zepetnek, Steven, and Tutun Mukherjee, eds. Companion to Comparative Literature, World Literatures, and Comparative Cultural Studies (2013).

== See also ==
- Comparative cultural studies
- Comparative literature
- History of literature
- List of first novels by language
- List of world folk-epics
- List of years in literature
- Literature by country
- Print culture
- Translation
- UNESCO Collection of Representative Works
- World cinema
- World history
- World music
