= Wolfgang Friedmann =

(1907 – 1972) German American legal scholar

Wolfgang G. Friedmann
- Born: 25 January 1907; Berlin, German Empire
- Died: September 20, 1972 (aged 65); New York City, US
- Resting place: June Cemetery, North Salem, Westchester County, New York, US
- Occupation: Legal scholar
- Spouse: Leah May Friedmann

Wolfgang Gaston Friedmann (25 January 1907 – 20 September 1972) was a German American legal scholar. Specializing in international law, he was a faculty member at Columbia Law School.

== Biography ==
Born in Berlin, Friedmann finished his studies of law at the Humboldt University of Berlin in 1930. Being Jewish, he immigrated to London in 1934, shortly after the Nazis' seizure of power in Germany. He obtained a University of London LLM, taught at University College London, became a British citizen in 1939 and served in the British Army during the Second World War.

He went as Professor to the University of Melbourne (1947-50) and then to the University of Toronto Law School (1950-55).

In 1955, he became a professor of international law at Columbia Law School, where he founded the Columbia Journal of Transnational Law. In 1972, he was robbed and stabbed to death in front of Public School 36 at Amsterdam Avenue between 122d and 123d Streets near Columbia's campus in Manhattan. The Wolfgang Friedmann Memorial Award was established in his honor.

== Selected bibliography ==
- The Crisis of the National State. London: Macmillan & Co., Limited. 1943 – via Internet Archive.
- Law and Social Change in Contemporary Britain. London: Stevens & Sons. 1951 – via Internet Archive.
- Law in a Changing Society. London: Stevens & Sons. 1959 – via Internet Archive.; 2nd ed. - 1971.
- The Changing Structure of International Law. New York: Columbia University Press. 1967 – via Internet Archive.
- Introduction to World Politics (5th ed.). London and New York: Macmillan and St. Martin Press. 1965 – via Internet Archive.
- Legal Theory (5th ed.). New York: Columbia University Press. 1967 – via Internet Archive.
- The State and the Rule of Law in a Mixed Economy. London: Stevens & Sons. 1971 – via Internet Archive.
- The Future of the Oceans. New York: George Braziller. 1971 – via Internet Archive.
