= John Jackson (law professor) =

American law professor (1932–2015)

John Howard Jackson
- Born: 6 April 1932; Kansas City, Missouri, US
- Died: 7 November 2015 (aged 83); Ann Arbor, Michigan, US
- Resting place: Forest Hill Cemetery (Ann Arbor, Michigan)
- Citizenship: United States
- Education: Princeton University (B.A.); University of Michigan Law School (J.D.)
- Occupations: legal scholar; educator
- Employer(s): United States Army, Japan; Foley, Sammond & Lardner; University of California at Berkeley Law School; University of Michigan Law School; U.S. Office of the Trade Representative; Georgetown University Law Center
- Known for: International trade law
- Notable work: World trade and the law of GATT: A Legal Analysis of the General Agreement on Tariffs and Trade (1 ed.). Indianapolis: Bobbs-Merrill. 1969.
- Spouse: Joan (Leland) Jackson (m. 1962)
- Children: Jeannette, Lee Ann, Michelle
- Parents: Howard Clifford Jackson (father); Lucile Deischer (mother)

John Howard Jackson (April 6, 1932 – November 7, 2015) was an American legal scholar and educator, expert in international trade law.

== Biography ==
John H. Jackson was born in Kansas City, Missouri to Howard Clifford and Lucile (Deischer) Jackson. He graduated from Hickman High School in Columbia, Missouri, in 1950. In 1954 he obtained a A.B. from Woodrow Wilson School of Public and International Affairs, Princeton University. Then, he served two years in the US Army stationed in Japan. In 1959, he earned his LL.B. from the University of Michigan Law School.

After two years of private law practice at the large corporate law firm Foley, Sammond & Lardner in Milwaukee, Wisconsin, he became professor at the University of California at Berkeley Law School (1961–1966), the University of Michigan Law School in Ann Arbor (1966–1997), and Georgetown University Law Center in Washington, D.C. (1998–2014). In 1968–1969 John H. Jackson was visiting professor at the University of Delhi, India and in 1975–1976 at the University of Brussels, Belgium.

In 1973–1974 he took a leave and served as General Counsel to the U.S. Office of the Trade Representative and worked on the Trade Act of 1974. In 1988–1989 he was Associate Vice President for Academic Affairs at the University of Michigan. Throughout the years, he was also an adviser to a number of congressional committees on trade policy.

He was a Vice President of the American Society of International Law (1990–1992) and organized its International Economic Law Group.

He was regarded as one of the chief architects of the World Trade Organization and its dispute settlement procedure.

He was the director of the Institute of International Economic Law, Georgetown University Law Center and editor-in-chief of the Journal of International Economic Law.

== Honours ==
- "Wolfgang Friedmann Memorial Award". Columbia Journal of Transnational Law. - 1992.
- Doctor Iuris Honoris Causa, University of Hamburg, Hamburg, Germany, 2003.
- Doctor Honoris Causa, European University Institute, Florence, Italy, 2008.
- The John H. Jackson Moot Court Competition

== Selected bibliography ==
- — (1969). World trade and the law of GATT: A Legal Analysis of the General Agreement on Tariffs and Trade (1 ed.). Indianapolis: Bobbs-Merrill.
- Jackson, John H.; Louis, Jean-Victor; Matsushita, Mitsuo (1984). Implementing the Tokyo Round: National Constitutions and International Economic Rules. Ann Arbor: The University of Michigan Press – via Internet Archive.
- — (1988). International Competition in Services: A Constitutional Framework. Washington, DC: American Enterprise Institute for Public Policy Research – via Internet Archive.
- — (1989). The World Trading System : Law and Policy of International Economic Relations (1 ed.). Cambridge, Mass.: MIT Press. ISBN 0-262-60021-8 – via Internet Archive.
- Jackson, John H.; Vermulst, Edwin A. (eds.). Andumping Law And Practice: A Comparative Study. Ann Arbor, MI: The University of Michigan Press – via Internet Archive.
- — (1990). Restructuring the GATT System (1 ed.). New York: Council on Foreign Relations Press – via Internet Archive.
- — (1998). The World Trade Organization: Constitution and Jurisprudence (1 ed.). London: Royal Institute of International Affairs – via Internet Archive.
- Jackson, John H.; Davey, William J.; Sykes, Alan O. (2002). Legal Problems of International Economic Relations: Cases, Materials and Text on the National and International Regulation of Transnational Economic Relations (4th ed.). St. Paul, Minn.: West Group – via Internet Archive.
- — (2006). Sovereignty, the WTO and Changing Fundamentals of International Law (1 ed.). Cambridge, UK; New York, USA: Cambridge University Press. ISBN 978-0-521-86007-9 – via Internet Archive.
