= Columbia Journal of Transnational Law =

- Discipline: Transnational, International & Comparative Law
- Language: English

Publication details
- History: 1961–present
- Publisher: Columbia Journal of Transnational Law Association, Inc. (United States)
- Frequency: 3 per year

Standard abbreviations
- Bluebook: Colum. J. Transnat'l L.
- ISO 4: Columbia J. Transnatl. Law

Indexing
- ISSN: 0010-1931
- LCCN: 97660538

Links
- Journal homepage; The Bulletin

The Columbia Journal of Transnational Law is a law review edited and published by students at Columbia Law School. One of the oldest student-run international law journals in the United States, it publishes scholarly articles and student notes on issues of transnational law.

== Ranking and Citations ==
The Columbia Journal of Transnational Law is the highest-ranked and most-cited specialty journal at Columbia Law School. It is listed among the Peace Palace Library's top international law journals.

The journal has been cited by the Supreme Court of the United States, the First Circuit Court of Appeals, the Second Circuit Court of Appeals, the United States Court of International Trade, and numerous other federal appellate and district courts. The journal has also been cited by the Permanent Court of Arbitration and the World Bank's International Centre for Settlement of Investment Disputes, as well as by separate and dissenting opinions of the International Court of Justice and International Tribunal for the Law of the Sea.

Several States, including Canada, Costa Rica, India, Israel, Nigeria, the United States, and South Africa, have also cited to the Journal in their written submissions, memorials, and counter-memorials to the International Court of Justice in respect of several landmark contentious cases and advisory opinions, including the Legality of the Threat or Use of Nuclear Weapons, Wall and the South West Africa Advisory Opinions.

== History ==
The Columbia Journal of Transnational Law was created by Wolfgang G. Friedmann and a group of Columbia law students belonging to the Columbia Society of International Law. The first volume, published in 1961 under the name the Bulletin of the Columbia Society of International Law, consisted of informal discussions of international legal questions. The second volume, published in 1963 under the title International Law Bulletin, adopted the tradition of the scholarly law review.

During its second decade, the journal expanded publication to three issues per year, experimented with themed issues, and published some of the early proceedings of the Friedmann Conference which is held annually at Columbia Law School. By the beginning of its third decade, the journal's themed issues—entire issues dedicated to the examination of current international law problems—became regular publications. These topical issues have examined international taxation, international trade embargoes and boycotts, China's legal development, sovereign debt rescheduling, socialist law and international satellite communications.

== Organizational structure and staff ==
The Columbia Journal of Transnational Law is published by The Columbia Journal of Transnational Law Association, Inc., a New York corporation. The corporation is overseen by a board of directors of 18 members. The journal is further assisted by a board of advisors consisting of 9 members. The 2023-2024 editorial staff for Volume 62 consists of 29 student editors and 41 staff members.

== The Bulletin ==
The Columbia Journal of Transnational Law also publishes the Bulletin, an online publication featuring student notes, legal updates, and interviews with legal scholars and practitioners.

== Wolfgang Friedmann Memorial Award ==
The Wolfgang Friedmann Memorial Award is presented annually to an individual who has made outstanding contributions to the field of transnational law. The award is given in memory of the journal's founder, Wolfgang Friedmann. The recipient of the award is honored at the annual Wolfgang Friedmann Banquet.

Recipients of the Award
Year	Recipient
2024	Sarah Cleveland
2023	Navi Pillay
2022	Christiana Figueres
2021	Ruth Bader Ginsburg
2020	Joan E. Donoghue
2019	David Miliband
2018	Anne-Marie Slaughter
2017	Stephen G. Breyer
2016	Martti Ahtisaari
2015	Lori Damrosch
2014	Aryeh Neier
2013	Shirin Ebadi
2012	M. Cherif Bassiouni
2011	George J. Mitchell
2010	Jerome A. Cohen
2009	James Crawford
2008	Antônio Augusto Cançado Trindade
2007	Sandra Day O'Connor Antonio Cassese
2006	Ian Brownlie
2005	Richard N. Gardner
2004	Giulano Amato
2003	Harold Hongju Koh
2002	Hans Blix
2001	Louise Arbour
2000	Gabrielle Kirk McDonald
1999	Thomas Franck
1998	Stephen M. Schwebel
1997	Conrad K. Harper
1996	James A. Baker III
1995	Boutros Boutros-Ghali
1994	Max M. Kampelman
1993	Michael H. Posner
1992	John J. Jackson
1991	Daniel Patrick Moynihan
1990	John N. Hazard
1989	Thomas Buergenthal
1988	John R. Stevenson
1987	Keith Highet
1986	Louis Henkin
1985	Rosalyn Higgins
1984	Tommy Koh
1983	Oscar Schachter
1982	Maxwell Cohen
1981	Telford Taylor
1980	Alona E. Evans
1979	Hardy C. Dillard
1978	Willis M. Reese
1977	Arthur H. Dean
1976	Oliver S. Lissitzyn
1975	Philip C. Jessup
