= Basher Murphy =

Scottish footballer

John Murphy
Personal information
- Date of birth: 11 March 1935 (age 91)
- Place of birth: Hill of Beath, Scotland
- Position: Left half

Youth career
- Cowdenbeath Royals

Senior career*
Years	Team	Apps	(Gls)
1950–1959	Cowdenbeath	92	(19)
- → Kelty Rangers (loan)
- → Bonnyrigg Rose Athletic (loan)
- → Crossgates Primrose (loan)
1959–1967	Queen of the South	202	(127)
- Raith Rovers
- * Club domestic league appearances and goals

John Murphy (born 11 March 1935) is a Scottish former footballer who made over 290 appearances in the Scottish League for Queen of the South and Cowdenbeath as a left half. He also played ice hockey for Dunfermline Royals.

== Personal life ==
Murphy served his National Service in the RAF and was stationed at RAF Padgate and in the Netherlands. While in the Netherlands, he trained with Sparta Rotterdam, but was unable to secure a work permit to play. After his retirement from football, Murphy worked as a joiner and at Andrew's Antennas in Lochgelly.

== Honours ==
- Cowdenbeath Hall of Fame
