= John Murphy (contractor) =

Irish business man (1913–2009)

John Murphy (5 October 1913 – 7 May 2009) was an Irish business man who established the construction and infrastructure contractor J. Murphy & Sons. The company, based in Kentish Town, with its green vans and lorries, works on building sites across the UK and Ireland. His brother Joe also went into construction in London, trading as Murphy Ltd and using grey vehicles, but that company went into administration and closed in 2013.

== Biography ==
Murphy was born at Loughmark, near Cahersiveen, County Kerry. He left school at 15 but found work hard to come by. He travelled to London and started up as a subcontractor in the building trade. The Second World War offered him a golden opportunity. New airfields were urgently needed; later, runway repairs were also necessary. He was successful in providing this service and at end of the war was well placed to help with large-scale reconstruction. Other ventures included electrification, cable installation, water facilities and road-building.

At his death in 2009, his worth was estimated at £190 million. He valued his privacy and was known to spend little on luxuries, instead preferring to spend time with his own workmen and other Irish friends.

== J Murphy & Sons ==
In the 1970s a specialist division of the company worked on the development of natural gas. Later projects included the Stansted Airport Rail Link, work in the City of London, the Channel Tunnel Rail Link and London's Olympic Park.

In 2007 J Murphy and Sons generated nearly £500 million of revenue and made pre-tax profits of £60 million. It was appointed lead contractor in the £125 million Liverpool-Manchester water pipeline project, which is to carry up to 100 million litres of water per day.

After Murphy's death in May 2009, leadership of the company passed initially to his daughter Caroline, who had been appointed deputy chairperson of the group in 2007. She later planned to turn the business into a worker's Co-op owned by its 3,500 employees, but other board members — notably her mother, brother and half-brother — resisted, and she resigned in 2014.

The company was then led by Steve Hollingshead until the appointment in 2017 of John Murphy's grandson, John B Murphy.

In the year to 31 December 2017 the company made a pre-tax profit of £12.43m from a turnover of £711m, and had 3,878 employees. In 2018, it experienced a slow down in growth, and cancelled its Christmas Party as part of a cost-cutting drive affecting jobs across the business.
