= Johnny Murphy (hurler) =

Irish hurler (born 1954)

Personal information
- Native name: Seán Ó Murchú (Irish)
- Born: Crossabeg, County Wexford
- Height: 5 ft 8 in (173 cm)

Sport
- Sport: Hurling
- Position: Forward
Club
- Years: Club
- 1970s-1990s: Crossabeg-Ballymurn
Inter-county
- Years: County
- 1970s-1980s: Wexford
Inter-county titles
- Leinster titles: 2
- All-Irelands: 0
- NFL: 0
- All Stars: 0

Johnny Murphy (born 1954 in Crossabeg, County Wexford) is an Irish retired sportsperson. He played hurling with his local club Crossabeg-Ballymurn and was a member of the Wexford senior inter-county team in the 1970s and 1980s.
