= Johnny Murphy (footballer, born 1879) =

Australian rules footballer (1879–1950)

Personal information
- Full name: Johnny Murphy
- Born: 12 December 1879
- Died: 29 August 1950 (aged 70)

Playing career^{1}
Years	Club	Games (Goals)
1905–06	Geelong	3 (0)
- ^{1} Playing statistics correct to the end of 1906.

Johnny Murphy (12 December 1879 – 29 August 1950) was an Australian rules footballer who played with Geelong in the Victorian Football League (VFL).
