= Jackie Murphy =

Scottish footballer

John Murphy
Personal information
- Full name: Francis John Murphy
- Date of birth: 16 August 1949
- Place of birth: Edinburgh, Scotland
- Date of death: 23 October 1970 (aged 21)
- Place of death: Edinburgh, Scotland
- Position: Left half

Senior career*
Years	Team	Apps	(Gls)
1967–1969	Notts County	19	(2)
1969–19??	Penicuik Athletic		
- * Club domestic league appearances and goals

Francis John Murphy (16 August 1949 – 23 October 1970) was a Scottish professional footballer who played as a left half in the Football League for Notts County.
