= Jack Murphy (podcaster) =

American manosphere personality

- Born: John Goldman c. 1976
- Education: George Mason University (BA); Georgetown University (MA)
- Occupations: Blogger; podcaster
- Years active: 2009–present
- Notable work: Democrat to Deplorable (2018)
- Website: jackmurphylive.com

John Goldman, better known as Jack Murphy, is an American internet personality, blogger, and podcast host. From 2009 to 2016, he worked for public charter schools in Washington, D.C. and was a senior manager of finance for the D.C. Public Charter School Board.

Murphy's podcast, Jack Murphy Live, ran from 2018 to 2022 and featured guests, including Mike Cernovich, Jack Posobiec, JD Vance, and Bronze Age Pervert. Murphy has been a fellow at the Claremont Institute and wrote the 2018 book Democrat to Deplorable.

== Early life and education ==
Murphy was born c. 1976. He graduated from George Mason University with a Bachelor of Arts in economics. He later attended the Georgetown School of Foreign Service, earning a Master of Arts in International Affairs. Murphy has said he is "Catholic-Irish" and "Russian-Jewish".

== Career ==
=== Charter schools in Washington, D.C. ===
In 2009, Murphy began working as a senior consultant for public charter schools in Washington, D.C. serving African American students. He worked in leadership roles at the William E. Doar Jr. Public Charter School (WEDJ) and the IDEA Public Charter School. The firm TenSquare appointed Murphy IDEA Public Charter School's executive director in 2012.

=== Blogging ===
From 2015, Murphy blogged under a pseudonym on his website, Jack Murphy Live, writing on subjects ranging from lifestyle and career advice to conservative politics and gender dynamics. In his own defense, he noted that he had criticized Richard Spencer for his advocacy of a white ethnostate.

In January 2018, it was publicly revealed that the pseudonymous blogger "Jack Murphy" was actually "John Goldman", and that he was a senior manager of finance for the D.C. Public Charter School Board. He was doxed in a Twitter post by Lacy MacAuley, a left-wing activist. Murphy confirmed on his blog that Jack Murphy was his pseudonym.

In June 2018, Murphy published the book Democrat to Deplorable.

=== Podcasting ===
Murphy started his podcast, Jack Murphy Live, in November 2018. He hosted Republican politicians, conservative pundits, and internet personalities from the manosphere. His guests included Aleksandr Dugin, Joe Kent, JD Vance, Blake Masters, Jack Posobiec, Mike Cernovich, Dave Rubin, and Bronze Age Pervert. He hosted around two shows a month, from November 2018 to June 2022, when he stopped producing new episodes altogether.

=== Other ventures ===
In 2019, Murphy founded the online organization, The Liminal Order. The group is men-only and costs $99 a month to join. The organization is marketed as a way for men to cultivate "healthy masculinity", help members network, and build generational wealth. Murphy's website claims a membership of 500.

Murphy was a 2021 Lincoln Fellow at the Claremont Institute, a conservative think tank in California.

== Personal life ==
Murphy is divorced and has three children.
