= Martin Puchner =

Literary critic and philosopher

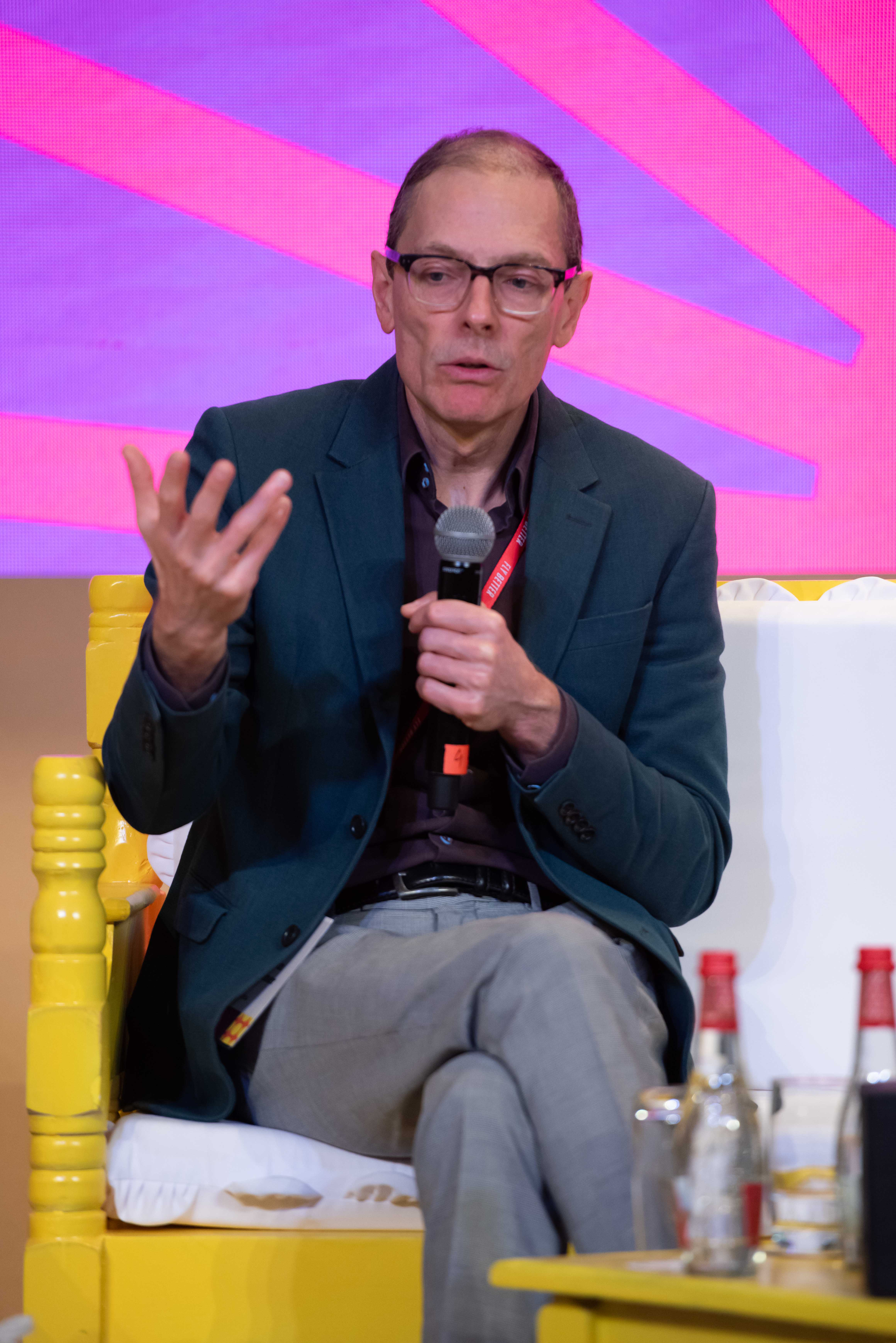
Martin Puchner (2025)

Martin Puchner is a German-American literary critic and philosopher who is the Byron and Anita Wien Chair of Drama and of English and Comparative Literature at Harvard University. He is the founding director of the Mellon School of Theater and Performance Research at Harvard University.

His early work as a literary critic focused on modernism, especially such genres as the closet drama, the literary manifesto, and modern drama. His philosophical work concerns the philosophical dialogue and the intersections of theater and philosophy. His recent work focuses on large-scale projects in literature, technology, and cultural history. He is the general editor of the Norton Anthology of World Literature and lectures on world literature.

== Education ==
He studied at Konstanz University, the University of Bologna, and the University of California, Santa Barbara, before receiving his Ph.D. at Harvard University in 1998.

== Career ==
Until 2009 he held the H. Gordon Garbedian Chair at Columbia University, where he also served as co-chair of the Theater Ph.D. program.

In 2017, he published The Written World: The Power of Stories to Shape People, History, Civilization. The book won advance praise from Margaret Atwood. The book was widely reviewed and translated into twenty languages.

On October 13, 2020, W. W. Norton & Company published his book, The Language of Thieves: My Family's Obsession with a Secret Code the Nazis Tried to Eliminate. The book provides a familial account of the Germanic cant called Rotwelsch. It was long-listed for the Wingate Prize. Writing for The Guardian Michael Rosen called it "A book about history, language and culture wrapped up in a detective story... It feels as if the writer is peeling back the skin to reveal Germany. I found it fascinating."

In 2022 he published Literature for a Changing Language, based on the inaugural Lectures in European History at Oxford University. It calls for a new approach to storytelling in an era of climate change. Publishers Weekly described the book as "a stirring manifesto."

In 2023, he published Culture: The Story of Us, from Cave Art to K-pop, which provides a global introduction to the arts and humanities. It was shortlisted for Phi Beta Kappa's 2024 Ralph Waldo Emerson Award.

== Honors ==
In 2017, he won a Guggenheim Fellowship. He was a 2017-2018 Cullman Fellow at the New York Public Library.

== Bibliography ==
- 2002; 2011: Stage Fright: Modernism, Anti-theatricality and Drama. Baltimore: Johns Hopkins University Press.
- 2003: Against Theatre: Creative Destructions on the Modernist Stage. Editor, with Alan Ackerman. New York: Palgrave Macmillan.
- 2003: Six Plays by Henrik Ibsen, with an introduction and notes by Martin Puchner. New York: Barnes and Noble.
- 2005: Karl Marx: The Communist Manifesto and Other Writings. With an introduction and notes by Martin Puchner. New York: Barnes and Noble.
- 2006: Theaterfeinde: Die anti-theatralischen Dramatiker der Moderne. Translated by Jan Kuveler. Freiburg: Rombach.
- 2006: Poetry of the Revolution: Marx, Manifestos, and the Avant-Gardes. Princeton: Princeton University Press, Winner of the James Russell Lowell Award.
- 2007: Modern Drama: Critical Concepts. New York: Routledge ISBN 978-0-415-38660-9
- 2009: The Norton Anthology of Drama. Co-editor. New York: Norton.
- 2010: The Drama of Ideas: Platonic Provocations in Theater and Philosophy. New York: Oxford University Press. Winner of the 2012 Joe A. Callaway Prize for best book in drama or theater.
- 2012: "The Norton Anthology of World Literature, 3rd edition." General editor. New York: Norton.
- 2017: "The Written World: The Power of Stories to Shape People, History, Civilization. New York: Random House, 2017.
- 2020: The Language of Thieves. New York: Norton.
- 2022: Literature for a Changing Planet. Princeton: Princeton University Press.
- 2022: Culture: A new world history. UK: Efinito. Published in the US in 2023 as Culture: The Story of Us, from Cave Art to K-pop. New York: Norton.
