= Jack Murphy Clothing =

Irish clothing company

- Company type: Private
- Industry: Fashion retail
- Founded: 1996; 30 years ago
- Founder: Michael Murphy and Gerard McAuley
- Headquarters: Skerries, County Dublin, Ireland
- Area served: Ireland; UK; Mainland Europe; North America
- Key people: Sarah Murphy (CEO)
- Products: Outerwear; waterproof jackets; waxed coats; tweed garments; Hats; Accessories
- Website: jackmurphy.ie

Jack Murphy Clothing is an Irish clothing company that produces outdoor and country attire. It was founded by Michael Murphy and Gerard McAuley around 1996 in Balbriggan, named for the former's father, who operated a drapery business in Skerries. It is a family-run business. It produces waterproof jackets, waxed coats, and tweed garments.

== History ==
Jack Murphy began a garment business in Skerries, North County Dublin, after the World War II, initially producing women's corsetry. Jack's son, Michael Murphy, later joined the company, which transitioned to focus on outerwear. By the 1980s, the Murphy family was manufacturing outdoor clothing and camping gear.

Around 1996, Michael Murphy and Gerard McAuley founded Jack Murphy Limited in Balbriggan, and developed a range of female and male "heritage style outerwear". It sold mostly through the retail trade, but had a warehouse with an outlet store in Stephenstown, Balbriggan.

In 2018, Jack Murphy's granddaughter, Sarah Murphy, joined the business. In 2021, Jack Murphy Clothing released a collection with Irish designer Deborah Veale.

== Operations ==
Jack Murphy Clothing is headquartered in Skerries, County Dublin, where its design operations are based. Its collections are sold in Ireland, the UK, mainland Europe, and North America. Michael Murphy is the lead designer, and Sarah Murphy is the CEO.

== Clothing ==
The Jack Murphy Clothing product line consists of outerwear and tweed apparel, including waterproof raincoats, waxed jackets, riding coats, sport coats, hats, and accessories. Its primary focus is on its womenswear line, with a smaller collection for men.

Queen Camilla and actress Kate Winslet have worn its coats.
