= John Murphy (Texas politician) =

John Murphy (born April 14, 1945) was the City Councilman for Place 3 in Richardson, Texas for 20 years and still serves as president of Max Impressions, Inc., a printing and graphics communications company.

== Business career ==
John Murphy came to the Dallas, Texas area in 1975 to work for Southern Union Company in the oil and gas industry as a Rate Manager, working with municipal and state agencies negotiating energy pricing. In 1981, Murphy went to work for Republic Bank (now Bank of America), married, and moved to Richardson, Texas. At Bank of America, Murphy rose to the position of Vice President, providing banking support to small businesses, corporations and to local and state governments. Murphy retired from Bank of America in 2001 and now serves as president of Max Impressions, Inc., a printing and graphics communications company.

== Political career ==
John Murphy served as City Councilman for the City of Richardson, Texas. He was elected to the City Council representing Place 3 in 1991 and served as the Place 3 representative until 2011. Murphy served as Mayor Pro Tem for the City of Richardson from 1995 to 2007. Murphy was most recently re-elected (May 2009) in a field of three with 55.66% of the vote.

In 2011, Murphy chose not to run for re-election, thus ending the career of one of the longest-serving Councilmembers in Richardson history. Place 3 was subsequently filled by Scott Dunn, who ran unopposed to fill Murphy's seat.

Murphy served on the following City Council subcommittees:

Years	Subcommittee
1991–2005 and 2007 - 2011 (chair 2009-2011)	Audit/Finance
1995–2007 and 2009–2011	Liaison to Arts Commission
1991–1995	Liaison to Library Board
1997–2007 and 2009–2011	Dallas/RISD Information Exchange

== Political activities ==
=== Neighborhood Vitality and Integrity ===
As a member of the Richardson Heights Homeowners’ Association, Murphy worked for neighborhood vitality and neighborhood integrity. As Mayor Pro Tem, Murphy worked with then-Mayor Gary Slagel to organize monthly meetings of City Council representatives with the presidents of all the homeowners' associations in Richardson. Murphy was a major proponent of the alternative zoning overlay in the Spring Valley area of Richardson, which encouraged apartment owners to redevelop their aging apartment buildings into other uses such as retail or office, without depriving the owners of any rights under the current zoning ordinances.

=== Erosion Control ===
Murphy also was an early proponent of city intervention in the care of the city's storm drainage system. In several parts of the city, the surface elements of the storm drainage system (i.e., “creeks”) were owned by the adjacent homeowners and not by the city. As the City developed, water runoff speeds increased, leading to erosion on private property. With the understanding that private homeowners could not afford the expensive repairs needed to protect their property (such as installing Gabion walls), Murphy strongly promoted a new erosion control policy wherein the city would take responsibility for preserving the drainage areas.

=== Audit/Finance Committee ===
On the Audit/Finance Committee, Murphy brought forward policies to maintain the city's reserves and to avoid unfunded projects. These policies bore fruit when, in 2008, the City of Richardson was upgraded from AA+ to AAA rating for standard long-term bond rating and underlying bond rating for Richardson's general obligation debt by Standard & Poor's Rating Services. At the time, Richardson was one of only four cities in the state of Texas and one of 88 cities in the nation with an "AAA" rating from Standard & Poor's.

== Regional Activities and Offices ==
Murphy served as the Region 13 representative on the Texas Municipal League Board of Directors from 1998 through 2002. Murphy was the voting representative for the cities of Richardson, Addison, Wylie, Sachse and Murphy on the Regional Transportation Council, and served as the organization's chairman in 2001–2002.

Murphy was elected president of the North Central Texas Council of Governments (NCTCOG) Executive Board for the 2008–09 term after serving as vice president for 2007–08. He served as board secretary in 2006.

In July 2009, Murphy was re-elected by the Richardson City Council to serve as Richardson's representative on the Regional Transportation Council and the North Central Texas Council of Governments.

== Education ==
Murphy graduated from Ohio University with a bachelor's degree in English literature in 1973 and a master's degree in Business Administration (MBA) in 1975.

== Military service ==
Murphy served four years in the United States Air Force as a medic in Germany, rose to the rank of staff sergeant, and was honorably discharged in 1972.
