= John Murphy (footballer, born 1886) =

Irish footballer

Personal information
- Date of birth: 1886
- Place of birth: Dublin, Ireland
- Position: Inside forward

Senior career*
Years	Team	Apps	(Gls)
–1909	Shelbourne		
1909–1910	Bradford City	6	(0)
1910–1912	Shelbourne		
1912–1913	Luton Town	11	(2)
1913–191?	Shamrock Rovers		

International career
1907–1910	Ireland League XI	2	(0)
1910	Ireland	3	(0)
- * Club domestic league appearances and goals

John Murphy (born 1886; date of death unknown) was an Irish professional footballer who played as an inside forward. He earned three caps for Ireland in 1910.

== Career ==
Murphy joined Bradford City from Shelbourne in May 1909. He made 6 league appearances for the club. He left the club in August 1912 to join Luton Town. Murphy made 11 appearances and scored 2 goals during his time at Luton, all of these coming in the league during the 1912–13 season. He later played for Shamrock Rovers.

== Career statistics ==
Appearances and goals by club, season and competition
Club	Season	League			FA Cup		Total	
Club	Season	Division	Apps	Goals	Apps	Goals	Apps	Goals
Luton Town	1912–13	Southern League Division Two	11	2	0	0	11	2
Career total			11	2	0	0	11	2

== Sources ==
- Frost, Terry (1988). Bradford City A Complete Record 1903-1988. Breedon Books Sport. ISBN 0-907969-38-0.
- Wash, Roger; Pitts, Simon (2014). Luton Town Football Club The Full Record. Roger Wash. ISBN 978-0-9560832-2-7.
