= John F. Murphy (South Dakota politician) =

American lawyer and politician

John Francis Murphy (July 19, 1930 – March 19, 2003) was an American lawyer and politician.

Murphy was born in Minneapolis, Minnesota, on July 19, 1930, to parents Frank and Myrtle Murphy. The family lived in Saint Cloud, and Murphy graduated from Saint John's Preparatory School. He enrolled at St. John's University, then served in the United States Army between 1952 and 1954. Murphy pursued a law degree at the University of Minnesota Law School after leaving the military. Murphy worked as a trust officer with National Bank of South Dakota, based in Sioux Falls until December 1962, when he assumed leadership of the Elk Point-based law firm Donley and Donley, which was renamed Donley and Murphy. Murphy maintained his legal practice for four decades, and concurrently served as city attorney in Elk Point for 36 years. Murphy was elected to the South Dakota Senate in 1964, as a Democrat, succeeding John T. Sanger in the first district. He served through 1967, and was later elected to the South Dakota House of Representatives between 1969 and 1970.

Murphy was married twice, firstly to Alice DeWispelaere in 1955. The couple divorced, and he married Cecelia Grunewaldt in 1990. Murphy died at home in Sioux Falls on March 19, 2003, aged 72.
