= Joe Murphy (contractor) =

Irish civil engineering contractor

John "Joe" Murphy (1917 – 2 August 2000) was an Irish civil engineering contractor. In his early life he worked as a police officer in the Garda Síochána but moved to England in 1945 to work in construction with his brother John Murphy. After ten years Joe established his own company, Murphy Limited, which became known as "Grey Murphy" to distinguish it from his brother's "Green Murphy" (J Murphy and Sons). Grey Murphy specialised in below-ground works, while Green Murphy specialised in above-ground works. Grey Murphy did well during the 1960s building boom and grew to become one of the largest Irish-owned construction firms.

== Early life ==
Joe Murphy was born as John Murphy in Cahersiveen, County Kerry in Ireland in 1917. He was educated at a national school at Knockeen, County Waterford, before joining the Garda Síochána (police service). Murphy travelled to England in 1945 to join his older brother, who was working in the construction industry there. Murphy's brother had adopted the name John when he arrived in England so Murphy adopted "Joseph" to avoid confusion. The pair worked as labourers before setting up their own sub-contractor. One of the firm's first projects was to remove hazards to shipping on the Dover-Calais route in the English Channel.

== Grey Murphy ==
After 10 years in partnership with his brother, Murphy left the firm to establish his own company specialising in cable-laying. Joe Murphy's company was Murphy Limited (under JMCC Holdings), while his brother's firm was J Murphy and Sons. The firms distinguished from each other as "Grey Murphy" and "Green Murphy" respectively, for the colours of their company vehicles. Grey Murphy tended to focus on below-ground work and Green Murphy on above-ground. At one stage the two companies accounted for 10% of the UK construction market.

Murphy's company, as well as other Irish-owned contractors, did well during the 1960s building boom. Murphy became a member of the fashionable Irish Club in Eaton Square, London, which became a centre for industry gossip. Murphy and his company became renowned for valuing good workmanship, for paying high wages and for employing Irish nationals. His friend, the actor Joe Lynch, claimed that Murphy employed more Irishmen than any firm based in Ireland.

Grey Murphy's Irish subsidiary, JMSE, was accused of bribing the senior politician Ray Burke. The company was investigated by the Flood Tribunal established in 1997. Murphy was not called in front of the tribunal due to ill health but was interviewed by them in Guernsey, though no action was taken against Murphy or the company.

== Personal life ==
Murphy's wife died in 1962, leaving him to raise a daughter and a three-month-old son. Murphy remarried in 1968 to the sister of his dead wife, they had no further children. In the 1960s Murphy and his brother invested heavily in the Isle of Man-based bank the International Finance and Trust Corporation. The bank collapsed and both men lost millions of pounds. Murphy was briefly in crisis, but eventually recovered around 80% of his investment. Murphy later moved to Guernsey and lived there as a tax exile.

Murphy's second wife died in 1991. Murphy died of cancer at home in Guernsey on 2 August 2000. At the time his company was one of the top 10 largest Irish-owned building firms; Murphy was personally worth £36 million. The company entered administration in 2013 and was closed down.
