= John F. Murphy (JAG) =

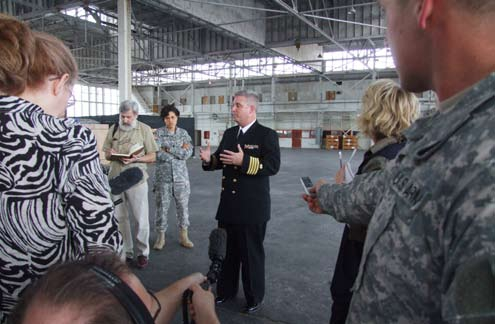
- John Murphy, chief prosecutor for the Office of Military Commissions addresses reporters.
- Known for: Prosecutor

John Murphy is an American lawyer and officer in the United States Naval Reserve.

Andy Worthington reported on May 6, 2009, that Murphy was replacing Lawrence Morris as Chief Prosecutor of the Guantanamo military commissions, and that Morris was retiring from active duty.

On December 12, 2008, while Murphy was an assistant Prosecutor in United States v. Omar Khadr, he had to present the case because lead Prosecutor Major Jeffrey Groharing was not present.

On August 9, 2009, Fox News reported that Murphy stated the Prosecution would comply with new rules barring the use of evidence obtained by torture, or cruel, inhumane interrogation techniques.

According to Carol Rosenberg, writing in the Lakeland Ledger, on July 15, 2009 Murphy told the Press that his office plans to charge 66 Guantanamo detainees, in the Guantanamo military commissions system.
