= John F. Murphy (law professor) =

American legal scholar (1937–2021)

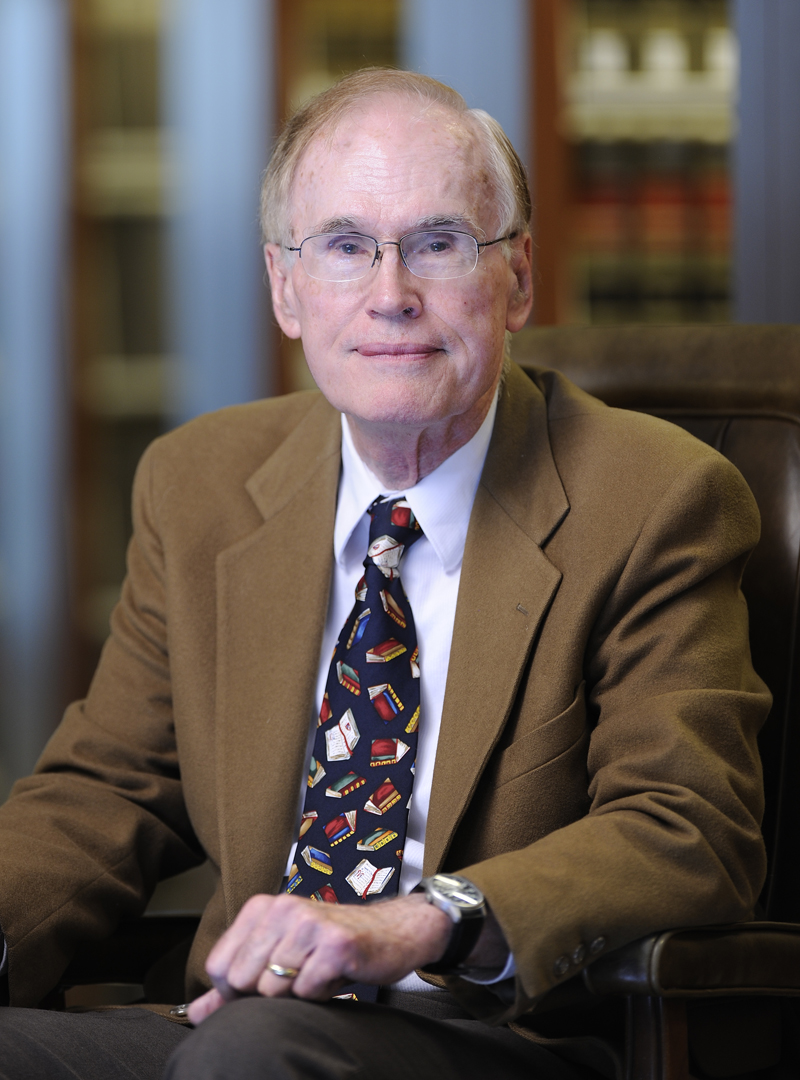
- Born: April 27, 1937; Larchmont, New York, U.S.
- Died: February 4, 2021 (aged 83); West Chester, Pennsylvania
- Known for: Law professor

John F. Murphy was an American lawyer and a professor at Villanova University. He was a widely cited author. He published multiple works on the intersection of international law and counter-terrorism.

== Education ==
education
B.A.	1959	Cornell University
J.D.	1962	Cornell University—specialized in International law

== Legal career ==
Murphy spent the year following law school participating in Syracuse University's Afro-Asia Public Service Fellowship Program working in India with the Indian government. Upon his return he spent a year working on Wall Street. Next, was worked at the United States State Department's Office of the Legal Advisor from 1964 to 1967. He returned to private practice in 1967 to 1969.

In 1969 he took a teaching position at the University of Kansas School of Law. Since then he taught at Cornell University, Georgetown University, the Naval War College and finally Villanova, in the United States. Outside the USA he taught in Aix-en-Provence, London, Mexico City, Paris and Haifa.

Murphy held positions of trust within professional organizations. For the American Bar Association he served as an Alternate Observer at the United States Mission to the United Nations and a member of its Council on International Law and participated in the Francis Shattack Security & Peace Initiative.

He served on the Executive Council of the American Society of International Law and on the Society's Board of Review and Development.

He was an honorary Vice President of the American Branch of the International Law Association. He served as a consultant to a number of organizations, including the State Department, the United States Department of Justice, the United Nations Crime Prevention Unit and the International Task Force on Prevention of Nuclear Terrorism. He served on the editorial boards of a number of legal journals.

In 2010 Murphy's employer, Villanova University, held a symposium to honor his forty-year tenure as a legal scholar.

John F. Murphy died on February 4, 2021, after a brief battle with infection. He was 83 years old.

== Publications ==
- John F. Murphy (2004). The United States and the Rule of Law in International Affairs. Cambridge University Press. ISBN 9780521529686.
- John F. Murphy (2010). The Evolving Dimensions of International Law: Hard Choices for the World Community. Cambridge University Press. ISBN 9780521709231.
- John Francis Murphy (1985). Punishing International Terrorists: The Legal Framework for Policy Initiatives. Rowman & Littlefield. ISBN 9780847674497.
- James Dinnage, John Francis Murphy (2008). The constitutional law of the European Union: Documentary supplement. LexisNexis Matthew Bender. ISBN 9781422424001.
- Alan C. Swan, John Francis Murphy (1991). Cases and materials on the regulation of international business and economic relations: documentary supplement. Matthew Bender. ISBN 9780820500577.
- James D. Dinnage, John Francis Murphy (1996). The Constitutional Law of the European Union: Instructor's Manual. Anderson Publishing Company. ISBN 9780870842559.
- John F. Murphy (1989). State Support of International Terrorism: Legal, Political, and Economic Dimensions. Westview Press. ISBN 9780720120158.
- John Francis Murphy (1983). The United Nations and the Control of International Violence: A Legal and Political Analysis. Manchester University Press. ISBN 9780719009426.
- Alona E. Evans, John Francis Murphy, ed. (1978). Legal aspects of international terrorism, Part 3. Lexington Books. ISBN 9780669021851.
