= Timeline of African-American firsts =

Achievements, cultural change, and "breaking the color barrier"

African Americans are an ethnic group in the United States. The first achievements by African Americans in diverse fields have historically marked footholds, often leading to more widespread cultural change. The shorthand phrase for this is "breaking the color barrier".

One prominent example is Jackie Robinson, who became the first African American of the modern era to become a Major League Baseball player in 1947. This was the beginning of the end of some 60 years of racial segregation, during which African American players were confined to the Negro leagues.

== 16th century ==
1528

- Estevanico becomes the first Black person to explore what would become the continental United States in the Narváez expedition.

1539

- Estevanico becomes the first Black person and first non-Native American person to explore what would become New Mexico.

== 17th century ==
1604

- First black person to arrive in what is now Maine: explorer and interpreter Mathieu Da Costa

1624

- First African American who was born in the British colonies that later became the United States: William Tucker (Virginia colony)

1651

- First African American to own land in the United States, July 24, 1651: Anthony Johnson (colonist)

1670

- First African American to own land in Boston: Zipporah Potter Atkins

== 18th century ==
=== 1730s–1770s ===
1738

- First free African-American community: Gracia Real de Santa Teresa de Mose (later named Fort Mose) in Spanish Florida

1746

- First known enslaved African American person to compose a work of literature: Lucy Terry with her poem "Bars Fight", composed in 1746 and first published in 1855 in Josiah Holland's History of Western Massachusetts.

1760

- First known African-American published author: Jupiter Hammon (poem "An Evening Thought: Salvation by Christ with Penitential Cries", published as a broadside)

1767

- First African-American clockmaker, Peter Hill, was born.

1768

- First known African American to be elected to public office: Wentworth Cheswill, town constable and justice of the peace in Newmarket, New Hampshire.

1770

- First casualty and first African-American casualty of the American Revolution: Crispus Attucks, Boston, Province of Massachusetts Bay. He was killed in the Boston Massacre, March 5, 1770.

1773

- First known African-American woman to publish a book: Phillis Wheatley (Poems on Various Subjects, Religious and Moral)
- First separate African-American church: Silver Bluff Baptist Church, Aiken County, South Carolina (Note: This claim is contested by the First Baptist Church, Petersburg, Virginia (1774) and the First Colored Baptist Church, renamed First African Baptist Church, Savannah, Georgia (recognized 1788, first congregation 1773).)

1775

- First African American to join the Freemasons: Prince Hall

1778

- First African-American U.S. military regiment: the 1st Rhode Island Regiment

=== 1780s–1790s ===
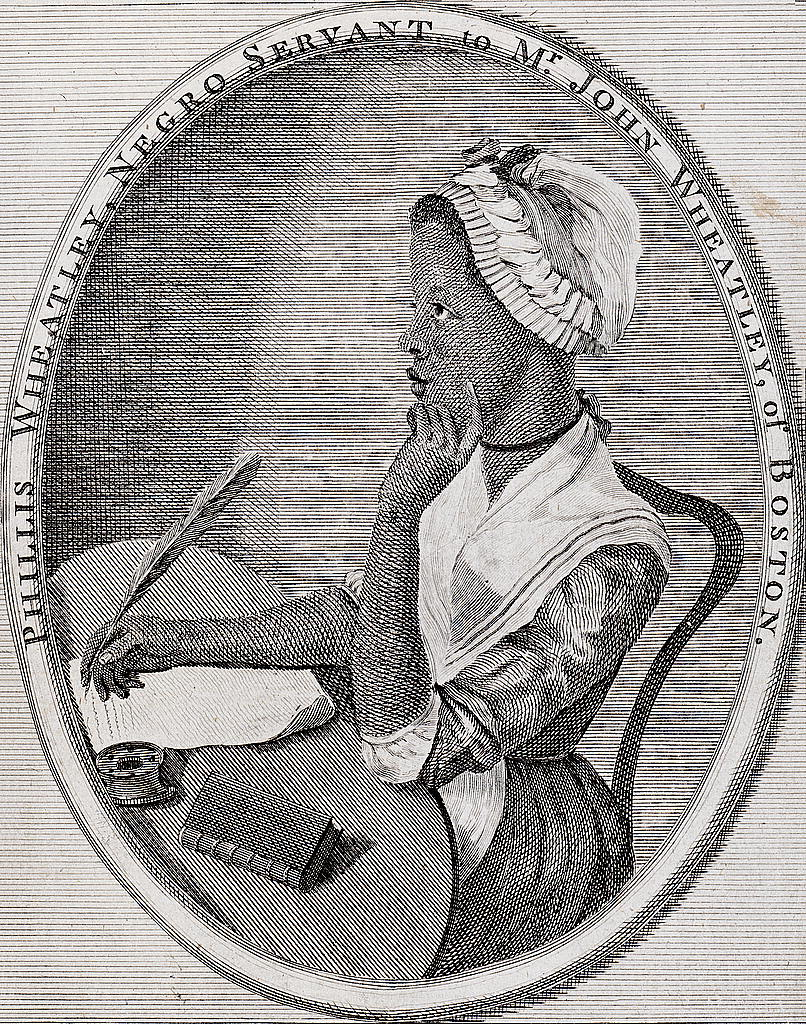
Phillis Wheatley

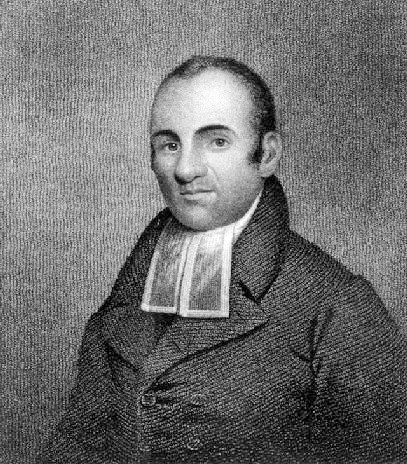
Lemuel Haynes

1783

- First African American to formally practice medicine: James Derham, who did not hold an M.D. degree. (See also: 1847)

1785

- First African American ordained as a Christian minister in the United States: Rev. Lemuel Haynes. He was ordained in the Congregational Church, which became the United Church of Christ

1792

- First major African-American Back-to-Africa movement: 3,000 Black Loyalist slaves, who had escaped to British lines during the American Revolutionary War for the promise of freedom, were relocated to Nova Scotia and given land. Later, 1,200 chose to migrate to West Africa and settle in the new British colony of Settler Town, which is present-day Sierra Leone.

1794

- First African Episcopal Church established: Absalom Jones founded African Episcopal Church of St. Thomas, Philadelphia, Pennsylvania
- First African Methodist Episcopal (AME) Church founded: Mother Bethel A.M.E. Church, Philadelphia, was founded by Richard Allen

1799

- First African American to attend college (Washington and Lee University): John Chavis; later went on to be a preacher and educator for both black and white students.

== 19th century ==
=== 1800s ===
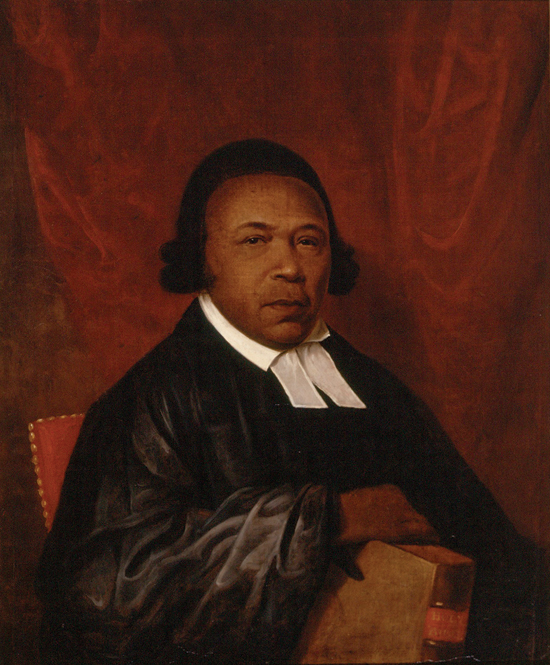
Absalom Jones

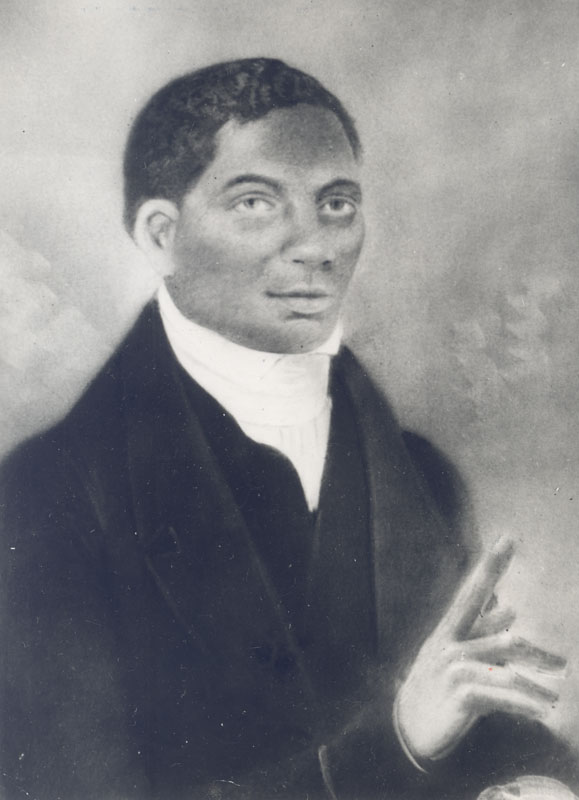
John Gloucester

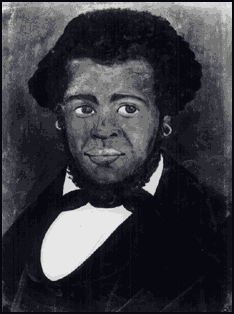
Absalom Boston

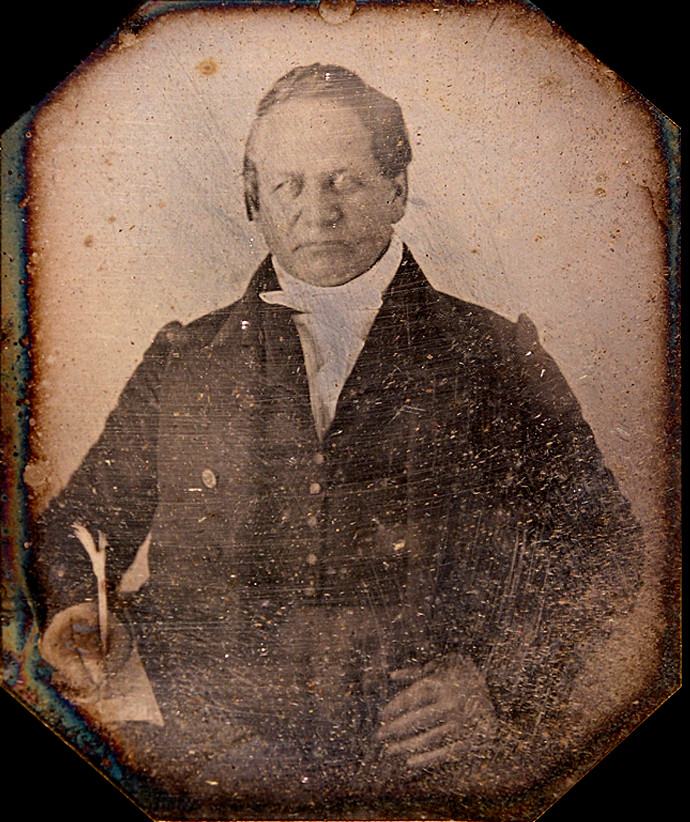
Alexander Twilight

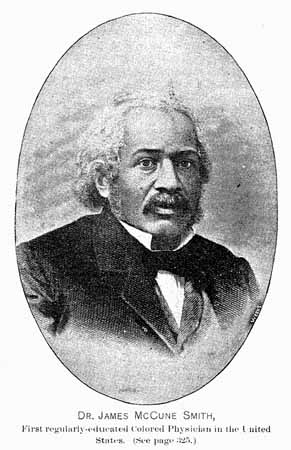
James McCune Smith

1804

- First African American ordained as an Episcopal priest: Absalom Jones in Philadelphia, Pennsylvania

1807

- First African-American Presbyterian Church in America: First African Presbyterian Church founded in Philadelphia, Pennsylvania by John Gloucester a former slave.

=== 1810s ===
1816

- Richard Allen founded the first fully independent African-American denomination: African Methodist Episcopal Church (AME), based in Philadelphia, Pennsylvania and mid-Atlantic states

1817

- The First African Baptist Church was the first African-American church west of the Mississippi River. It had its beginnings in 1817 when John Mason Peck and the formerly enslaved John Berry Meachum began holding church services for African Americans in St. Louis. Meachum founded the First African Baptist Church in 1827. Although there were ordinances preventing blacks from assembling, the congregation grew from 14 people at its founding to 220 people by 1829. Two hundred of the parishioners were slaves, who could only travel to the church and attend services with the permission of their owners.

=== 1820s ===
1821

- First African American to hold a patent: Thomas L. Jennings, for a dry-cleaning process
- First African American theatre, the African Grove Theatre, was founded in New York City by: William Alexander Brown

1822

- First African-American captain to sail a whaleship with an all-black crew: Absalom Boston There were six black owners of seven whaling trips before Absalom Boston's in 1822.

1823

- First African American to receive a degree from an American college: Alexander Twilight, Middlebury College (See also: 1836)

1826

- First African American to graduate from Bowdoin College: Future governor of the Republic of Maryland, John Brown Russwurm
- First African American to graduate from Amherst College: Edward Jones (missionary)

1827

- First African-American-owned-and-operated newspaper: Freedom's Journal, founded in New York City by Rev. Peter Williams Jr., Samuel Cornish, John Brown Russwurm and other free blacks

1828

- First African American to graduate from Dartmouth College: Edward Mitchell

1829

- First African American to attend Princeton Theological Seminary (and any United States theological seminary) and graduate: Theodore S. Wright

=== 1830s ===
1832

- First governor of African descent in what is now the United States: Pío Pico, an Afro-Mexican, was the last governor of Alta California before it was ceded to the U.S. Like all Californios, Pico automatically became a U.S. citizen in 1848.

1836

- First African American elected to serve in a state legislature: Alexander Twilight, Vermont (See also: 1823)
- First African American to found a town and establish a planned community: Free Frank McWorter (New Philadelphia, Illinois)
- First African American governor of the Republic of Maryland or any other colony in Africa: John Brown Russwurm

1837

- First formally trained African-American medical doctor: Dr James McCune Smith of New York City, who was educated at the University of Glasgow, Scotland, and returned to practice in New York. (See also: 1783, 1847)

=== 1840s ===
1844

- First African American approved to practice law: Macon Bolling Allen from the bar association of Portland, Maine

1845

- First African American to practice law: Macon Bolling Allen from the Boston bar

1847

- First African American to graduate from a U.S. medical school: Dr. David J. Peck (Rush Medical College) (See also: 1783, 1837)

1848

- First African-American president of any nation: Joseph Jenkins Roberts, Liberia

1849

- First African-American college professor at a predominantly white institution: Charles L. Reason, New York Central College

=== 1850s ===
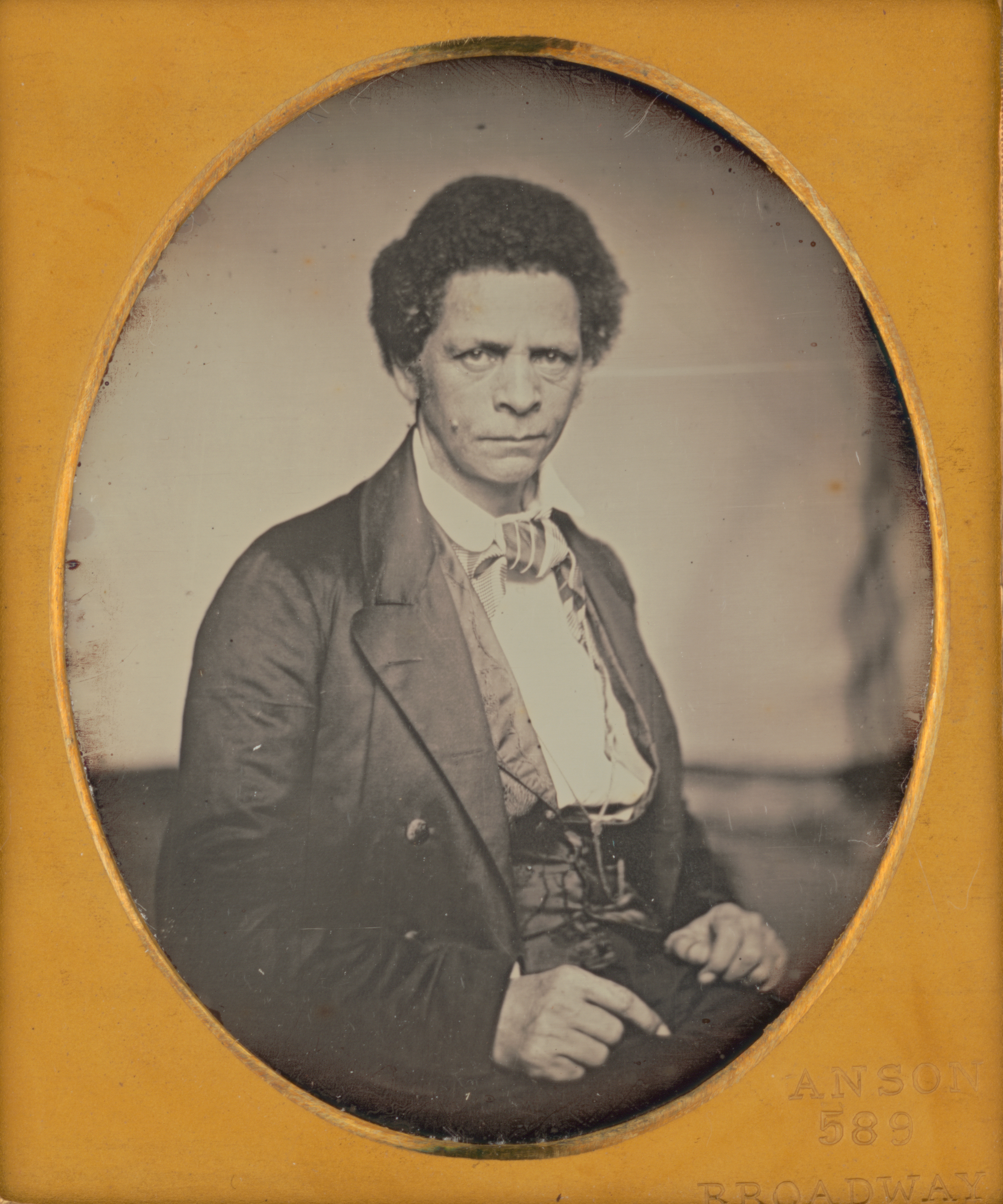
Joseph Jenkins Roberts

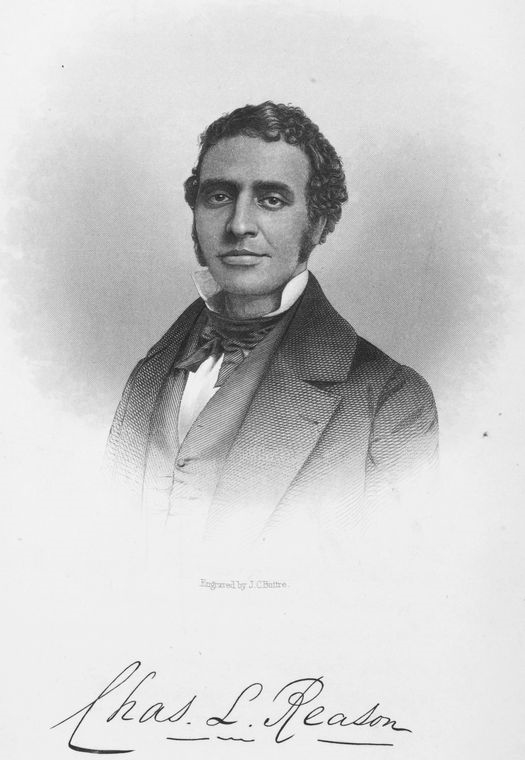
Charles L. Reason

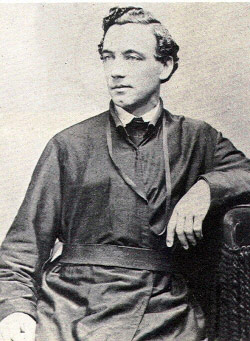
Patrick Francis Healy

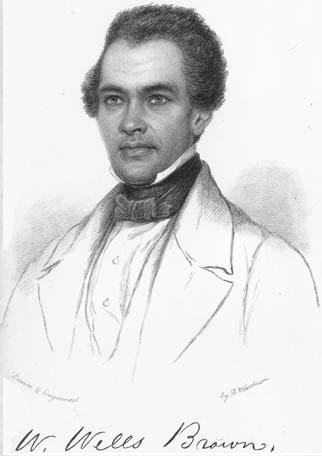
William Wells Brown

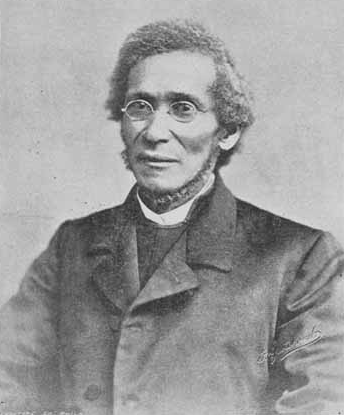
Daniel Alexander Payne

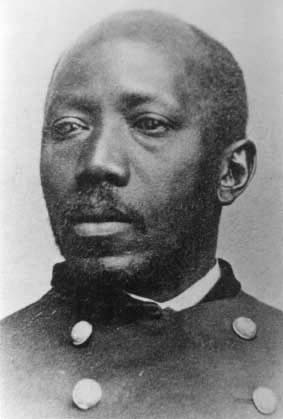
Martin R. Delany

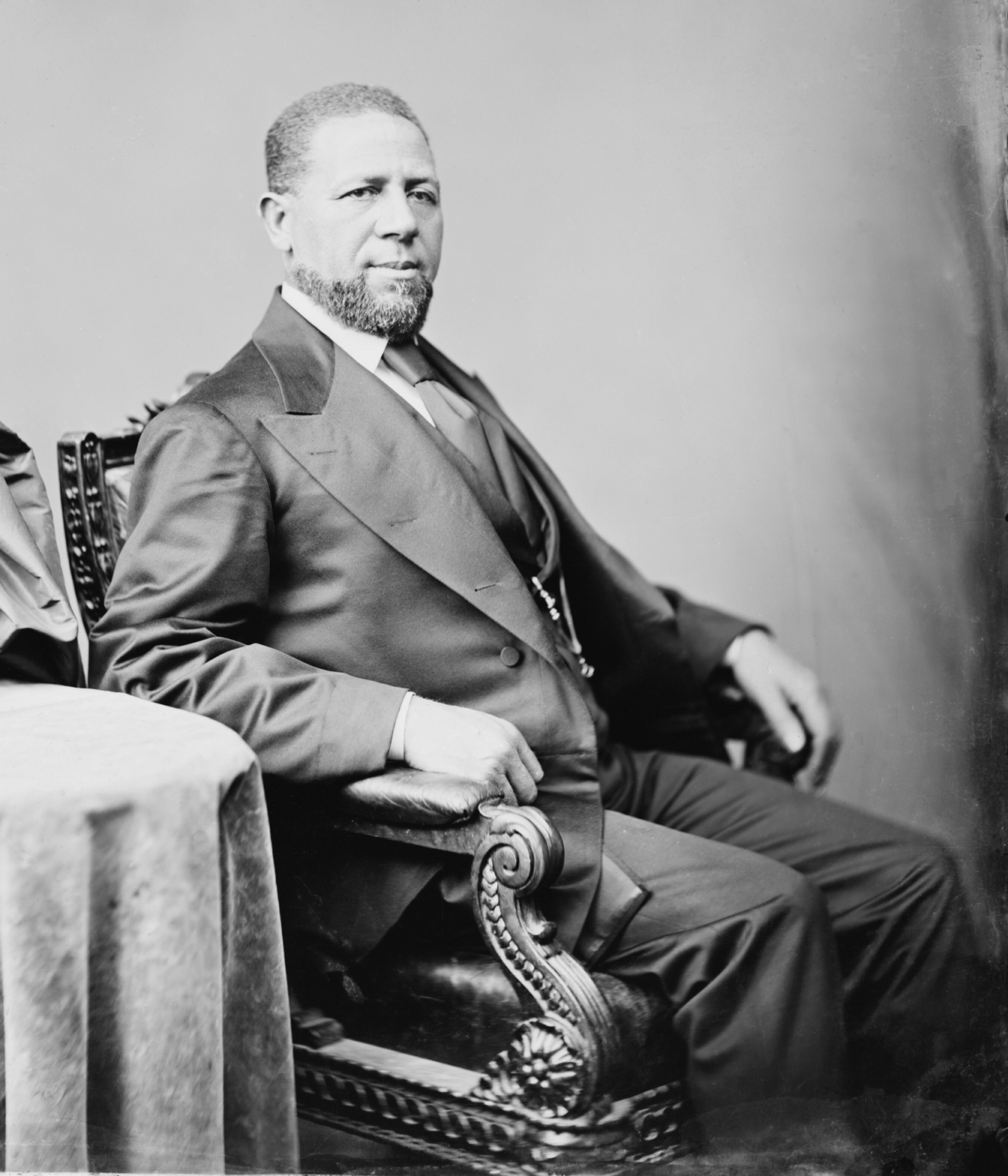
Hiram Revels

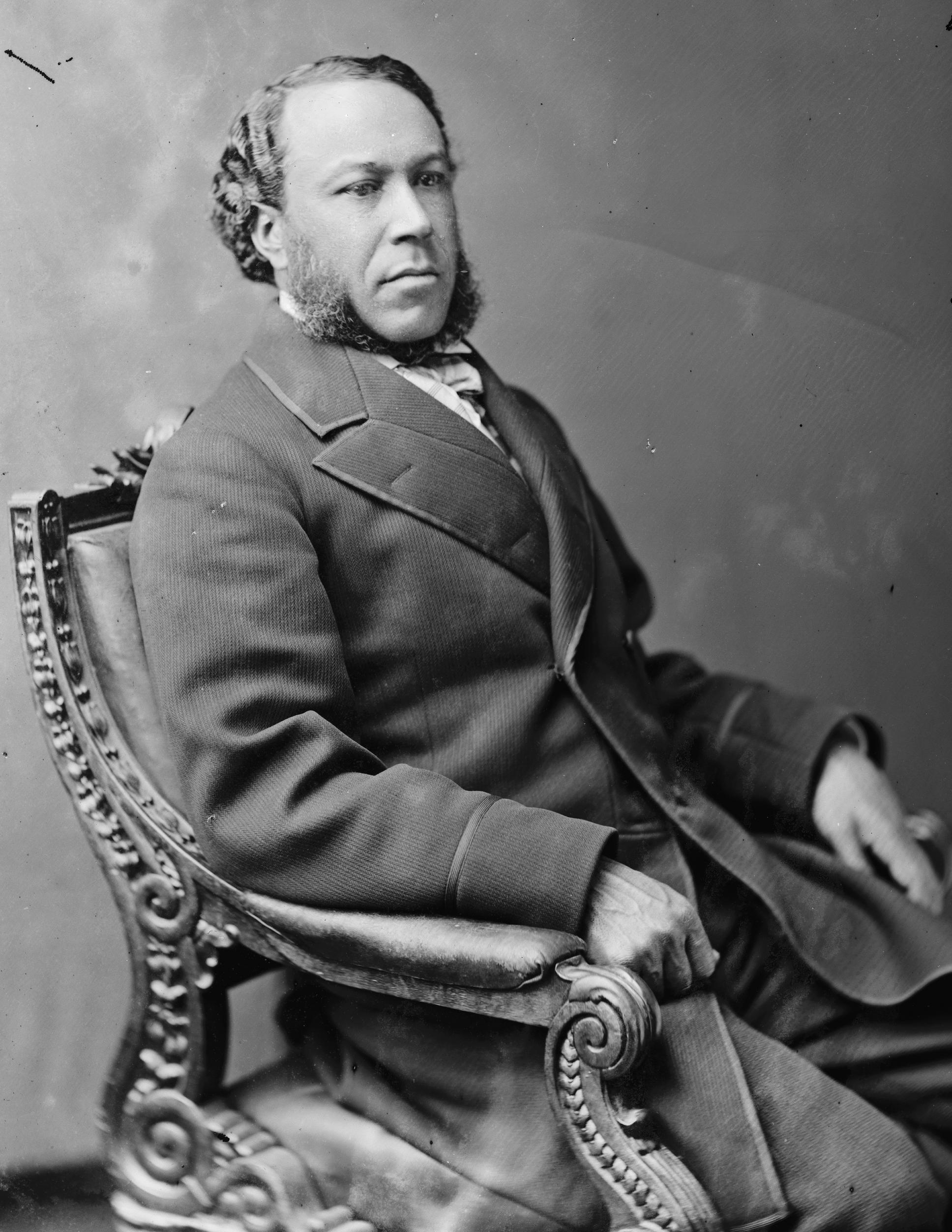
Joseph Rainey

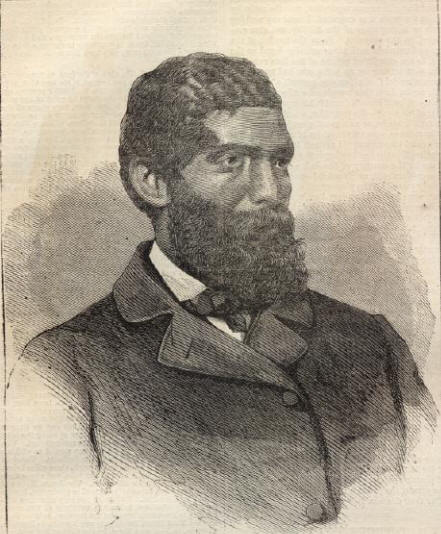
John Stewart Rock

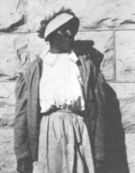
Cathay Williams

Ebenezer Bassett

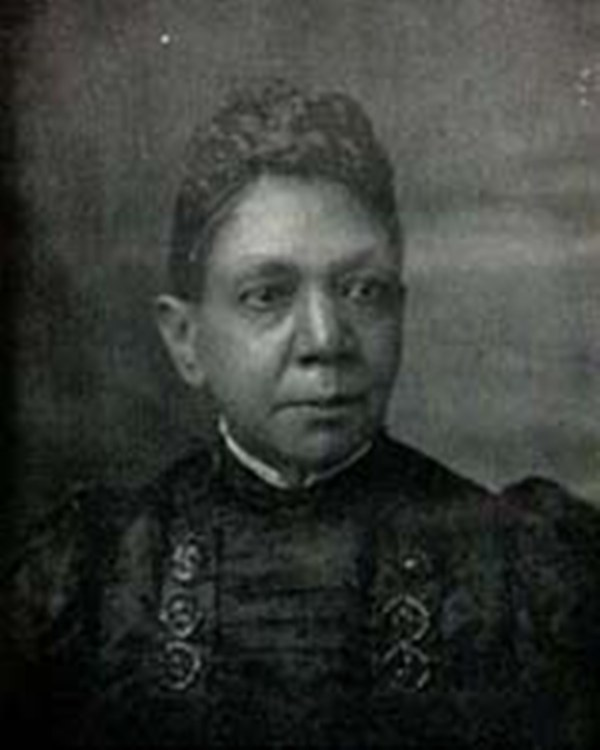
Fanny Jackson Coppin

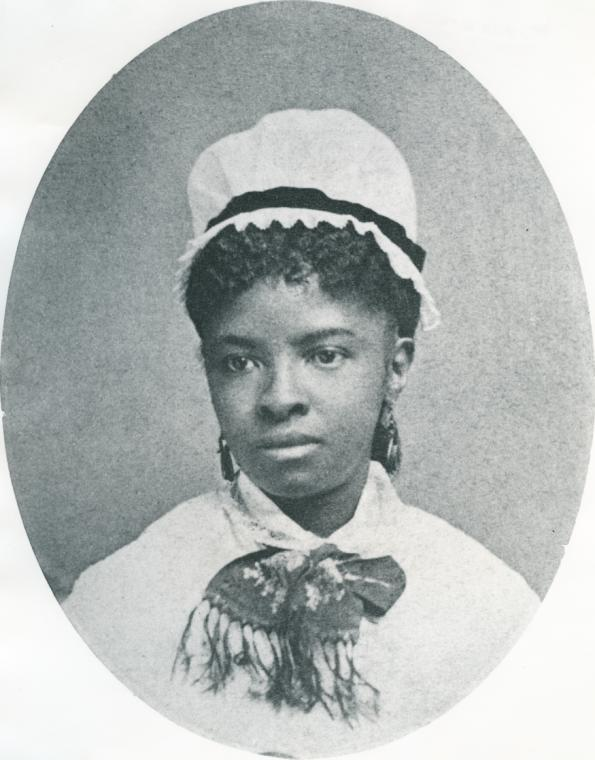
Mary Eliza Mahoney

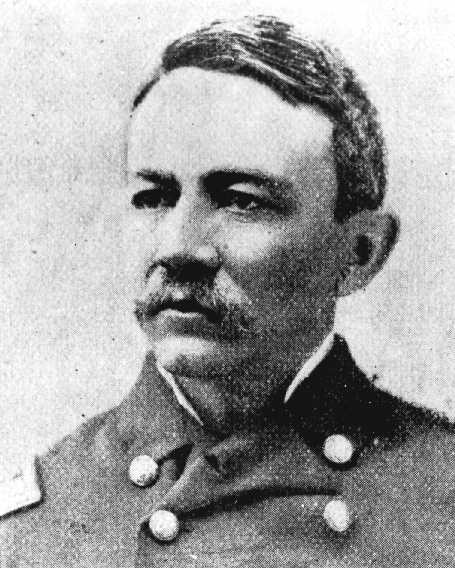
Michael A. Healy

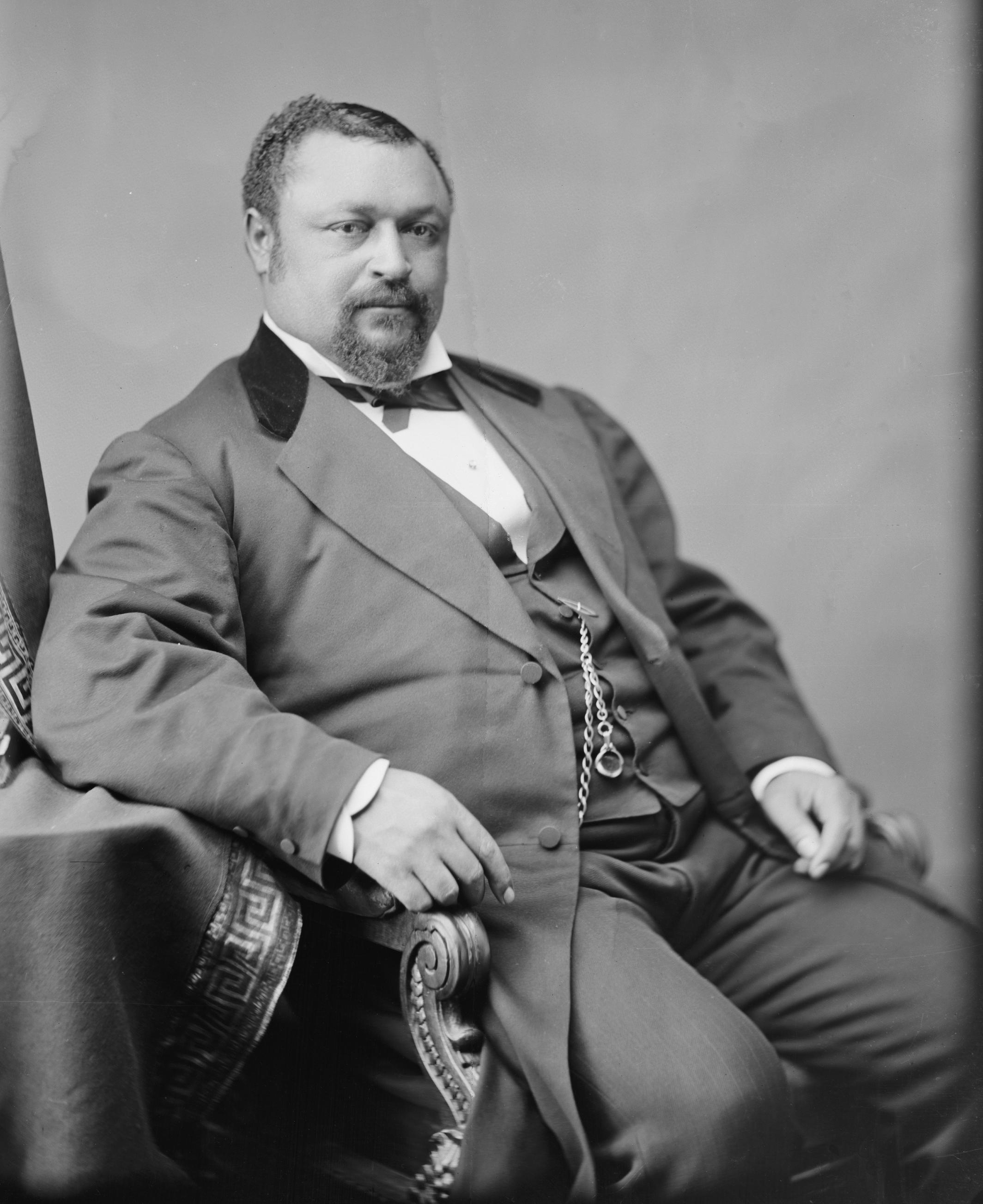
Blanche K. Bruce

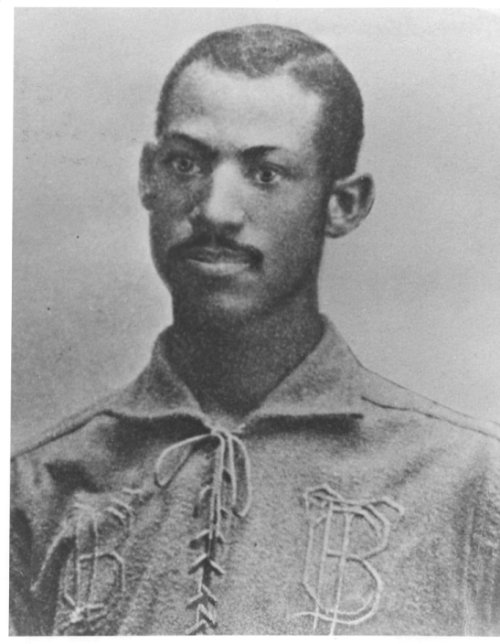
Moses Fleetwood Walker

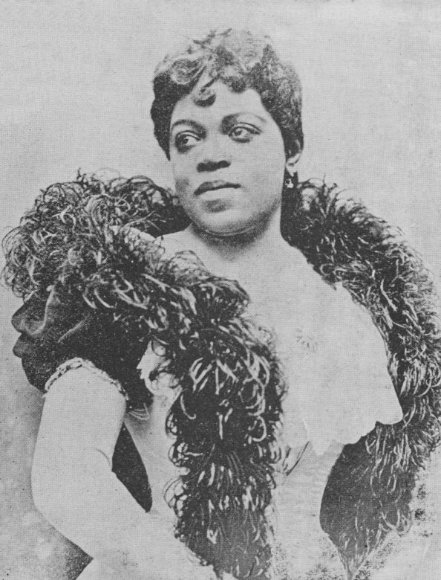
Matilda Sissieretta Joyner Jones

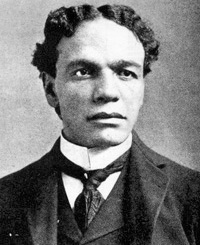
William H. Lewis

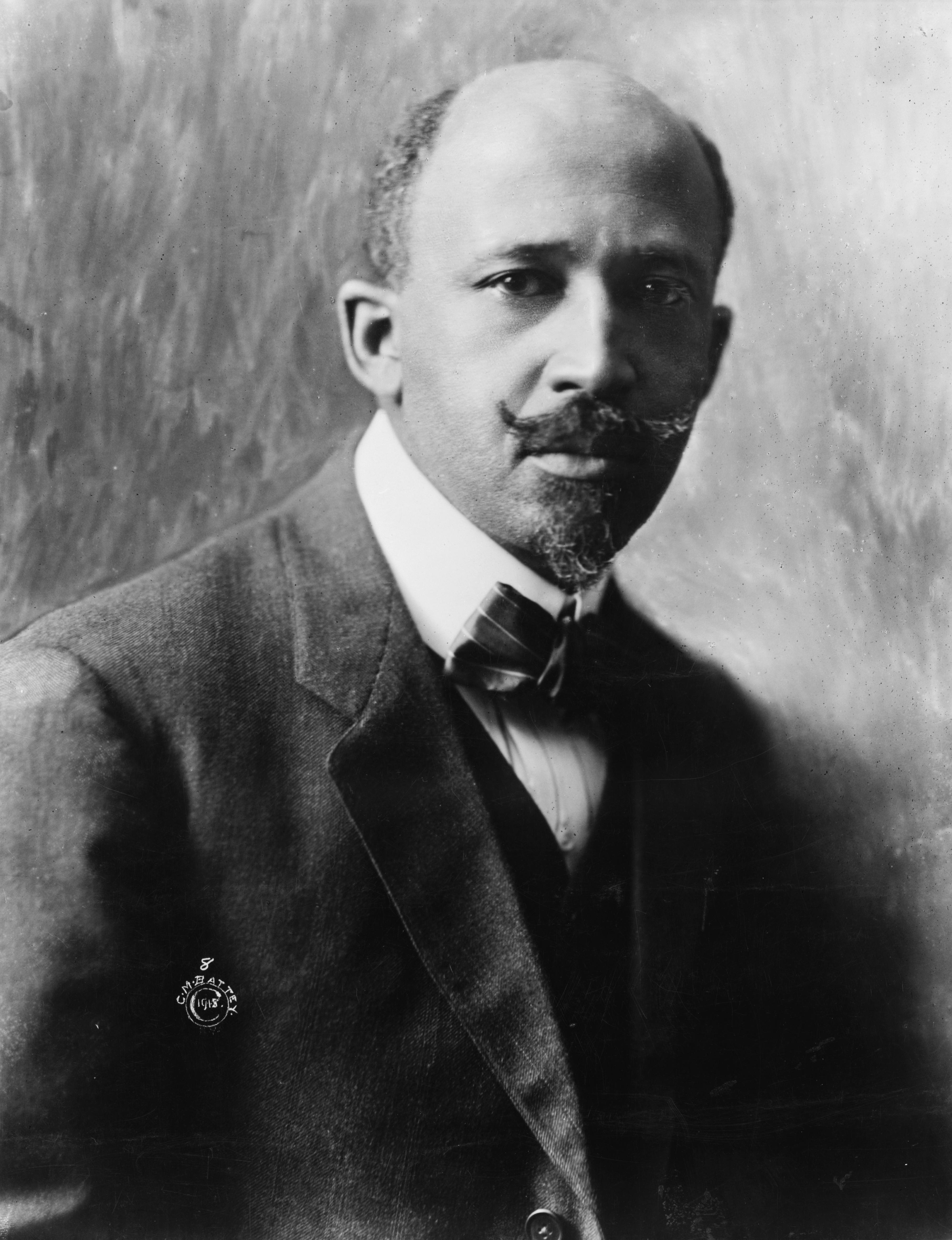
W. E. B. Du Bois

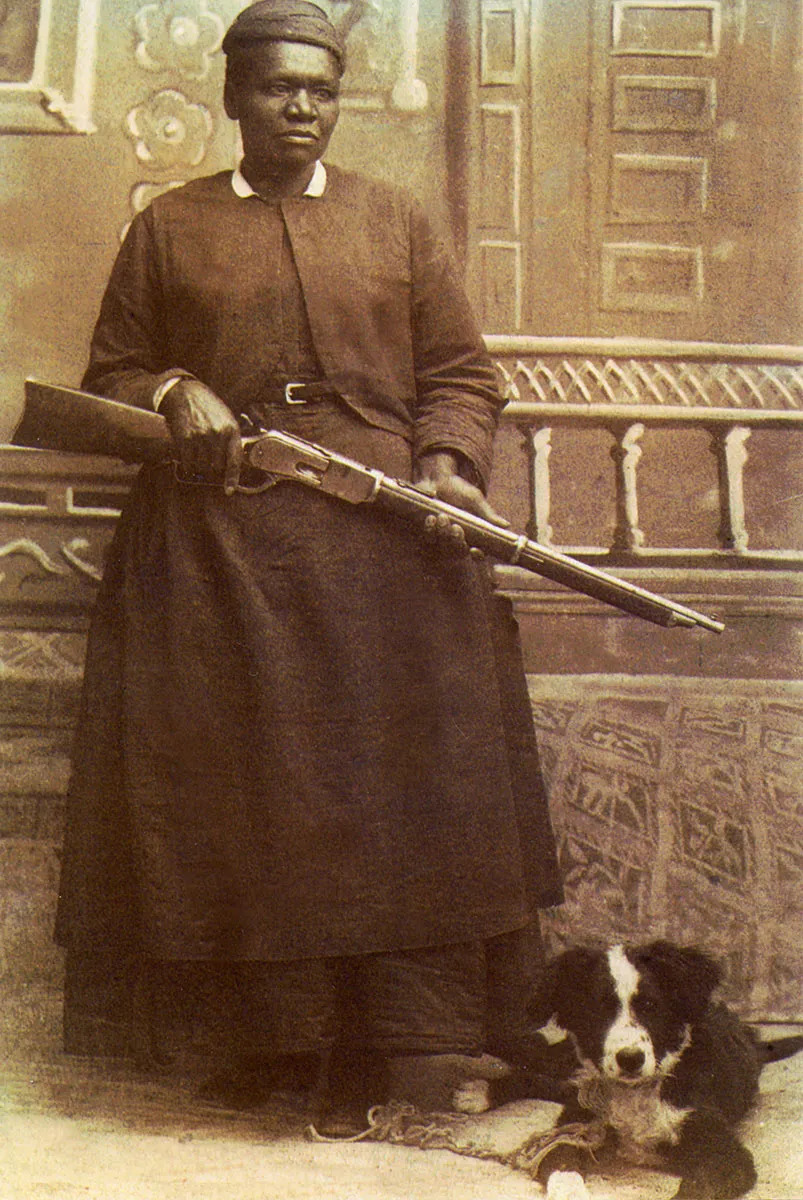
Mary Fields

Augustine Tolton

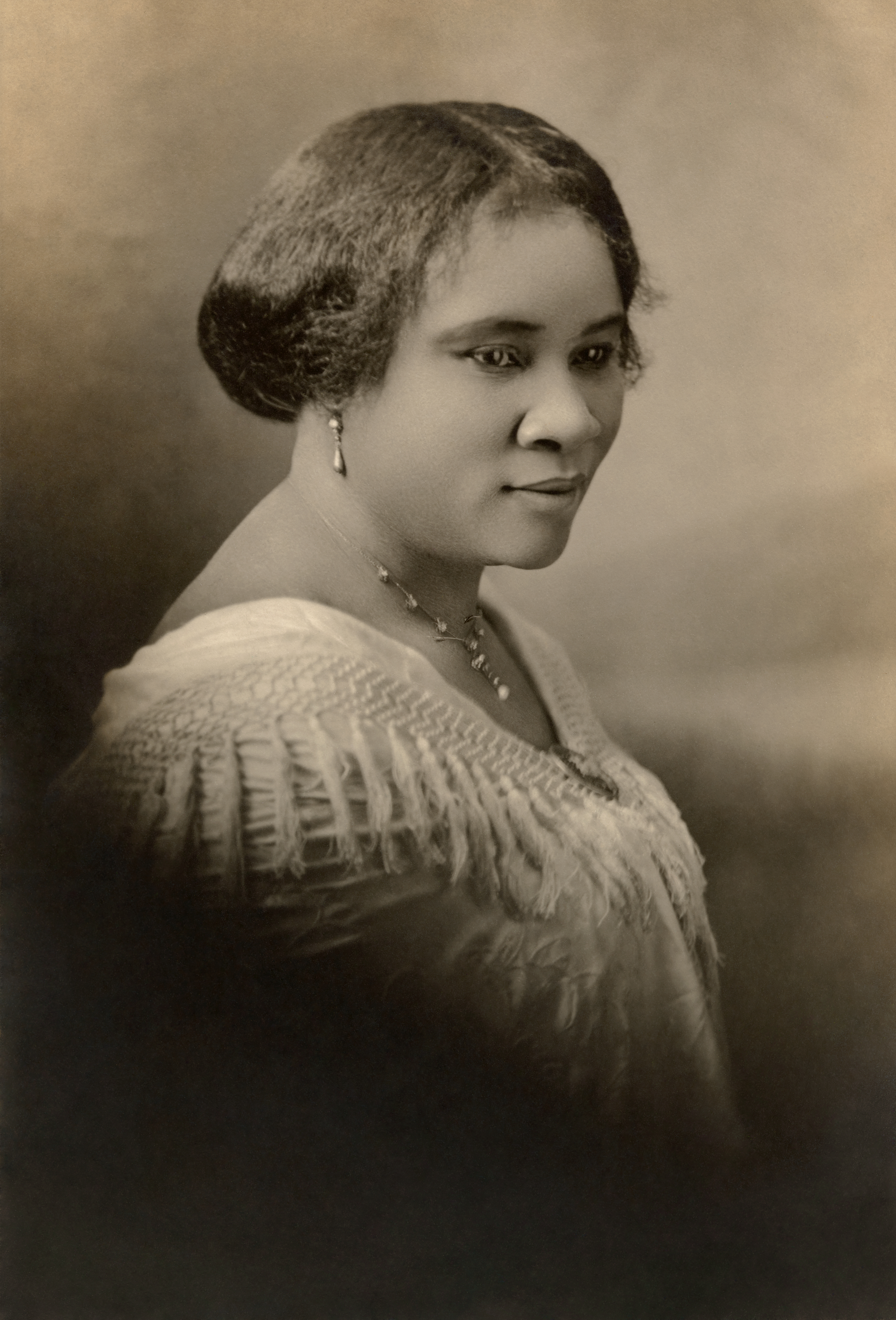
Madam C. J. Walker

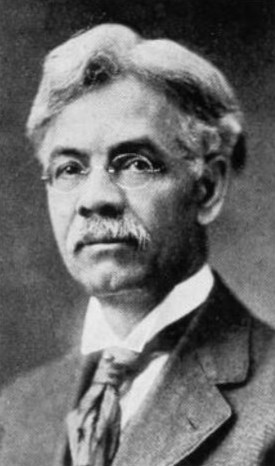
Butler R. Wilson

1850

- First African-American woman to graduate from a college (graduated with a Literary Degree from the Ladies' Literary Course of Oberlin College): Lucy Stanton

1851

- First African-American member of the Society of Jesus (Jesuits): Patrick Francis Healy (See also: 1866, 1874)

1852

- First African-American student at the Female Medical College of Pennsylvania: Sarah Mapps Douglass

1853

- First novel published by an African American: Clotel; or, The President's Daughter, by William Wells Brown, then living in London. (Note: Because it was published in the UK, the book is not the first African-American novel published in the United States. This credit goes to one of two disputed books: Harriet Wilson's Our Nig (1859), brought to light by Henry Louis Gates Jr. in 1982; or Julia C. Collins' The Curse of Caste; or The Slave Bride (1865), brought to light by William L. Andrews, an English literature professor at the University of North Carolina at Chapel Hill, and Mitch Kachun, a history professor at Western Michigan University, in 2006. Andrews and Kachun document Our Nig as a novelized autobiography, and argue that The Curse of Caste is the first fully fictional novel by an African American to be published in the United States.)
- First African American to build and serve as captain of his own ship: Joseph P. Taylor of Portland, Maine

1854

- First African-American Catholic priest: James Augustine Healy (see 1875 and 1886)
- First institute of higher learning created to educate African-Americans: Ashmun Institute in Pennsylvania, renamed Lincoln University in 1866. (See also firsts in 1863)
- First African-American physician to be admitted as a member of a medical society in the United States (the Massachusetts Medical Society): John van Salee de Grasse
- First African-American performer to perform before British royalty (command performance for the queen at Buckingham Palace): Elizabeth Greenfield

1858

- First published play by an African American: The Escape; or, A Leap for Freedom by William Wells Brown
- First African-American woman college instructor: Sarah Jane Woodson Early, Wilberforce University
- First African-American Missionary Bishop of Liberia: Francis Burns of Windham, New York; of the Methodist Episcopal Church.

=== 1860s ===
1861

- First North American military unit with African-American officers: 1st Louisiana Native Guard of the Confederate Army
- First African-American US federal government civil servant: William Cooper Nell

1862

- First African-American woman to earn a B.A.: Mary Jane Patterson, Oberlin College
- First recognized U.S. Army African-American combat unit: 1st South Carolina Volunteers

1863

- First college owned and operated by African Americans: Wilberforce University in Ohio (Note: Founded earlier; not fully owned and operated by African Americans until 1863.) (See also: 1854)
- First African-American president of a college: Bishop Daniel Payne (Wilberforce University)
- First African-American physician to hold a commission in the U.S. Army and the first African-American hospital administrator: Alexander Thomas Augusta
- First African-American chaplain in the United States Colored Troops: Henry McNeal Turner
- First African American to earn the Medal of Honor: William Harvey Carney

1864

- First African-American woman in the United States to earn an M.D.: Dr. Rebecca Lee Crumpler

1865

- First African-American field officer in the U.S. Army: Martin Delany
- First African-American attorney admitted to the bar of the U.S. Supreme Court: John Stewart Rock
- First African American to be commissioned as captain in the Regular U.S. Army: Orindatus Simon Bolivar Wall, known as OSB Wall
- First African American commissioned into the Revenue Service, the forerunner of today's United States Coast Guard: Michael A. Healy

1866

- First African American to earn a Ph.D.: Father Patrick Francis Healy from University of Leuven, Belgium (See also 1851, 1874)
- First African-American woman enlistee in the U.S. Army: Cathay Williams
- First African-American woman to serve as a professor: Sarah Jane Woodson Early; Xenia, Ohio's Wilberforce University hired her to teach Latin and English

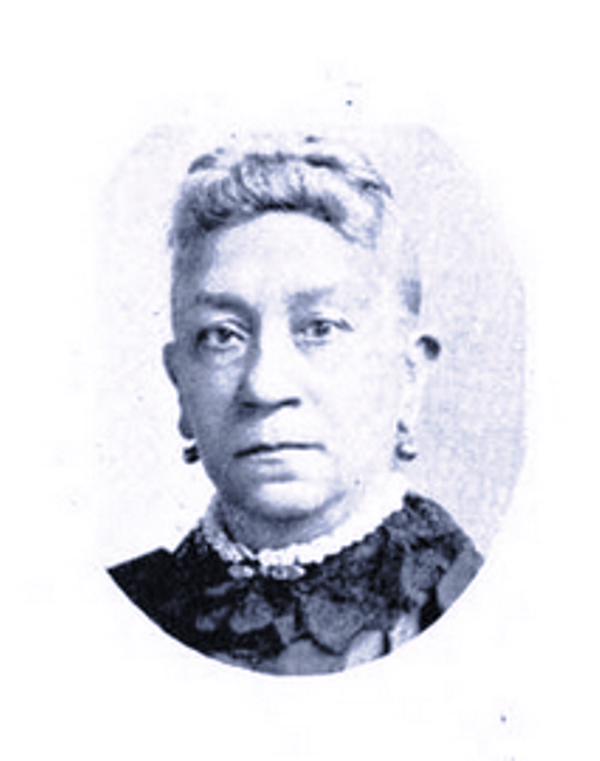
Sarah Jane Woodson Early

1868

- First elected African-American Lieutenant Governor: Oscar Dunn (Louisiana).
- First African-American mayor: Pierre Caliste Landry, Donaldsonville, Louisiana
- First African-American elected to the U.S. House of Representatives: John Willis Menard. His opponent contested his election, and opposition to his election prevented him from being seated in Congress. (See also: 1870)
- First African-American medical professor in the United States (professor at Howard University College of Medicine): Alexander Thomas Augusta
- First African American in the United States elected to statewide office (Secretary of State of South Carolina): Francis Lewis Cardozo

1869

- First African-American U.S. diplomat: Ebenezer Don Carlos Bassett, minister to Haiti
- First African-American woman school principal: Fanny Jackson Coppin (Institute for Colored Youth)
- First African American to receive a dental degree and become a dentist: Robert Tanner Freeman

=== 1870s ===
1870

- First African American to vote in an election under the 15th Amendment to the United States Constitution, granting voting rights regardless of race: Thomas Mundy Peterson
- First African American to graduate from Harvard College: Richard Theodore Greener.
- First African American elected to the U.S. Senate, and first to serve in the U.S. Congress: Hiram Rhodes Revels (R–MS). (Note: Revels, the Mississippi State Senate's Adams County representative, was elected by the U.S. Senate in January 1870 to fill an unexpired term.)
- First African American to serve in the U.S. House of Representatives: Joseph Rainey (R-SC). (Note: Rainey, a South Carolina state senator, was elected to fill the seat vacated by B. Franklin Whittemore. Rainey took his seat on December 12, 1870. John Willis Menard was actually the first African American elected to the House (1868), but he was denied his seat.)
- First African American admitted to West Point: James Webster Smith

1871

- First African-American page in the United States House of Representatives: Alfred Q. Powell, who was appointed in 1871 by Charles H. Porter (R-VA), with recommendations from William Henry Harrison Stowell (R-VA) and James H. Platt Jr. (R-VA).
- First non-elected African-American governor (Louisiana): Oscar Dunn (See also: Douglas Wilder, 1990)
- First African-American faculty member at Harvard Dental School: George Franklin Grant
- First Black land grant college established in the United States: Alcorn State University

1872

- First African-American midshipman admitted to the United States Naval Academy: John H. Conyers (nominated by Robert B. Elliott of South Carolina).
- First African-American nominee for Vice President of the United States: Frederick Douglass by the Equal Rights Party. (Note: Douglass did not seek the nomination or campaign after being nominated.)
- First non-elected African-American governor (Louisiana): P.B.S. Pinchback (Note: The first African-American governor is disputed. See Oscar Dunn above in 1871.)
- First known African-American woman postmaster (Postmaster of Covington, Louisiana): Anna M. Dumas

1873

- First African-American speaker of the Mississippi House of Representatives, and of any state legislature: John R. Lynch
- First African American to attend the School of the Art Institute of Chicago: Lottie Wilson Jackson
- First African American elected city judge (Little Rock, Arkansas): Mifflin Wistar Gibbs

1874

- First African-American president of a major college/university: Father Patrick Francis Healy, S.J. of Georgetown College. (See also: 1851, 1863, 1866)
- First African American to preside over the House of Representatives as Speaker pro tempore: Joseph Rainey

1875

- First African-American Roman Catholic bishop: Bishop James Augustine Healy, of Portland, Maine. (See also: 1854)
- First African-American elected member of the American Philological Association (APA): Richard Theodore Greener

1876

- First African American to earn a doctorate degree from an American university: Edward Alexander Bouchet (Yale College Ph.D., physics; also first African American to graduate from Yale, 1874). (See also: 1866)

1877

- First African-American graduate of West Point and first African-American commissioned officer in the U.S. military: Henry Ossian Flipper.
- First African-American elected to Phi Beta Kappa: George Washington Henderson.
- First African American to command a vessel of the United States Government (Revenue Cutter Chandler): Michael A. Healy

1878

- First African-American police officer in Boston, Massachusetts: Sergeant Horatio J. Homer.
- First African-American baseball player in organized professional baseball: John W. "Bud" Fowler.
- First African-American artist to perform in the White House: Marie Selika Williams

1879

- First African American to serve as a sheriff or chief of police in Vermont: Stephen Bates, Vergennes, Vermont.
- First African American to graduate from a formal nursing school: Mary Eliza Mahoney, Boston, Massachusetts.
- First African American to play major league baseball: Possibly William Edward White; he played as a substitute in one professional baseball game for the Providence Grays of the National League, on June 21, 1879. Work by the Society for American Baseball Research (SABR) suggests that he may have been the first African American to play major league baseball, predating the longer careers of Moses Fleetwood Walker and his brother Weldy Walker by five years; and Jackie Robinson by 68 years.
- First African American to preside over the United States Senate: Blanche K. Bruce

=== 1880s ===
1880

- First African American to command a U.S. ship: Captain Michael Healy.
- First African-American world champion in pedestrianism, a 19th-century forerunner to racewalking and ultramarathons: Frank Hart.
- First African American to command a major U.S. Government installation (Pea Island Life-Saving Station): Richard Etheridge

1881

- First African American whose signature appeared on U.S. paper currency: Blanche K. Bruce, Register of the Treasury.

1882

- First fully state-supported four-year institution of higher learning for African Americans: Virginia State University

1883

- First known African-American woman to graduate from one of the Seven Sisters colleges: Hortense Parker (Mount Holyoke College) (Note: Parker graduated from Mount Holyoke when it was still a seminary.)
- First African-American woman to earn a PhD (music from the Kansas Conservatory of Music and Elocution, now part of the University of Kansas and earned one month shy of her 18th birthday): Nettie Craig-Asberry
- First African American to receive the Medal of Honor twice, both for peace-time actions: Robert Augustus Sweeney

1884

- First African American to play professional baseball at the major-league level: Possibly Moses Fleetwood Walker, but see also William Edward White in 1879. (See also: Jackie Robinson, 1947)
- First African-American woman to hold a patent: Judy W. Reed, for an improved dough kneader, Washington, D.C. (Note: This was previously thought to be Sarah E. Goode (for the cabinet bed, Chicago, Illinois).)
- First African American to enlist in the U.S. Signal Corps: William Hallett Greene
- First African American to lead a political party's National Convention: John R. Lynch, Republican National Convention.
- First African American to deliver a keynote address at a political party's National Convention: John R. Lynch, Republican National Convention.

1886

- First Roman Catholic priest publicly known at the time to be African American: Augustine Tolton, Quincy and Chicago, Illinois (See also: 1854)

1888

- Second African-American woman to receive a patent: Miriam Benjamin
- First African-American women to earn a master's degree (Oberlin College, Ohio): Anna J. Cooper and Mary Church Terrell

1889

- First African American to earn a Ph.D. in a field of the biological sciences (biology): Alfred Oscar Coffin

=== 1890s ===
1890

- First African-American woman to earn a dental degree in the United States: Ida Rollins, University of Michigan.
- First African American to record a best-selling phonograph record: George Washington Johnson, "The Laughing Song" and "The Whistling Coon."
- First African American woman to earn a military pension for her own military service: Ann Bradford Stokes.
- First African-American woman in the U.S. to earn a degree in botany: Jane Eleanor Datcher

1891

- First African-American police officer in present-day New York City: Wiley Overton, hired by the Brooklyn Police Department prior to 1898 incorporation of the five boroughs into the City of New York. (See also: Samuel J. Battle, 1911)

1892

- First African American to sing at Carnegie Hall: Matilda Sissieretta Joyner Jones
- First African American named to a College Football All-America Team: William H. Lewis, Harvard University
- First African American to graduate from Massachusetts Institute of Technology (MIT): Robert Robinson Taylor

1893

- First African American to obtain degrees from both Harvard College and Harvard Law School: Clement G. Morgan
- First African American accepted into the League of American Wheelmen (LAW): Kittie Knox

1894

- First woman and first African-American woman deacon in the African Methodist Episcopal Zion Church: Julia A. J. Foote

1895

- First African-American woman to work for the United States Postal Service: Mary Fields
- First African American to earn a doctorate degree from Harvard University: W.E.B. Du Bois, Ph.D.
- First president and co-founder of the National Medical Association: Robert F. Boyd

1896

- First African-American female dentist to graduate from Howard University's dental school: Marie Imogene Williams.
- First African American to be elected alderman in New England: Clement G. Morgan

1897

- First African-American to graduate from Vassar College by passing for white: Anita Florence Hemmings.
- First African American to graduate from Yale Medical School: William F. Penn
- First African American on record to have successfully performed pericardium (the sac surrounding the heart) surgery to repair a wound: Daniel Hale Williams

1898

- First African American appointed to serve as U.S. Army Paymaster: Richard R. Wright
- First African-American diplomat to represent the United States in a white majority country when appointed to Russia: Richard Theodore Greener
- First African-American graduate of Radcliffe college: Alberta Virginia Scott

1899

- First African American to achieve world championship in any sport: Major Taylor, for one-mile track cycling
- First African-American woman elected to Phi Beta Kappa (Middlebury College in Vermont): Mary Annette Anderson

== 20th century ==
=== 1900s ===
1901

- First African American invited to dine at the White House: Booker T. Washington

1902

- First African-American professional basketball player: Harry Lew (New England Professional Basketball League) (See also: 1950)
- First African-American professional American football player: Charles Follis
- First African-American boxing champion: Joe Gans, a lightweight (See also: 1908)
- First African-American artist whose work became a part of the White House collection: Lottie Wilson Jackson

1903

- First Broadway musical written by African Americans, and the first to star African Americans: In Dahomey
- First African-American woman to found and become president of a bank: Maggie L. Walker, St. Luke Penny Savings Bank (since 1930 the Consolidated Bank & Trust Company), Richmond, Virginia
- First African American to be appointed as an Assistant United States Attorney: William H. Lewis
- First African American to earn a Ph.D. in philosophy: Thomas Nelson Baker Sr.
- First African American superintendent of a national park (Sequoia National Park): Charles Young

1904

- First Greek-letter fraternal organization founded by African Americans: Sigma Pi Phi
- First African American to participate in the Olympic Games, and first to win a medal: George Poage (two bronze medals)

1905

- First African-American to earn a doctorate degree in educational psychology (University of Chicago, Chicago): Charles Henry Thompson
- First African American to head a public library (Western Branch Library of the Louisville Free Public Library): Thomas Fountain Blue
- First African-American woman to attend the Massachusetts Institute of Technology (MIT): Marie C. Turner

1906

- First intercollegiate Greek-letter organization founded by African Americans: Alpha Phi Alpha (ΑΦΑ), at Cornell University
- First academically trained African-American forester: Ralph E. Brock at the Pennsylvania State Forest Academy

1907

- First African-American Greek Orthodox priest and missionary in America: Very Rev. Fr. Robert Josias Morgan
- First African-American Rhodes Scholar: Alain LeRoy Locke
- First African-American woman to receive a federal commission (to sculpt scenes for the Negro Pavilion at the Jamestown Tercentennial Exposition): Meta Vaux Warrick Fuller

1908

- First African-American heavyweight boxing champion: Jack Johnson (See also: 1902)
- First African-American Olympic gold medal winner: John Taylor (track and field medley relay team). (See also: DeHart Hubbard, 1924)
- First intercollegiate Greek-letter sorority established by African Americans: Alpha Kappa Alpha (ΑΚΑ) at Howard University

1909

- First African American to reach the north pole: Matthew Henson

=== 1910s ===
1910

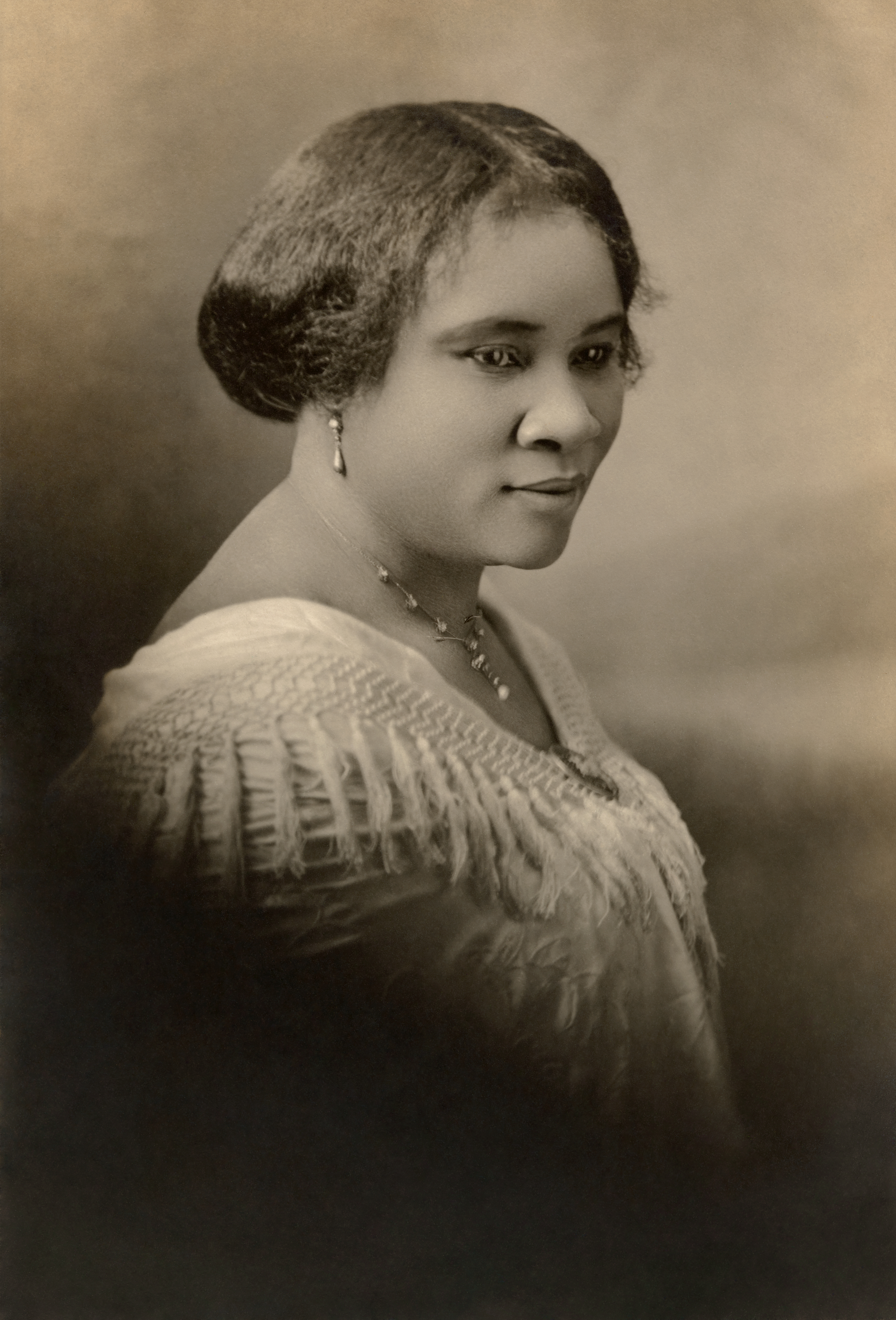
Madam C. J. Walker

- First African-American female millionaire: Madam C. J. Walker
- First African-American woman to be recorded commercially: Daisy Tapley
- First African American to be appointed as one of the five United States Assistant Attorneys General: William H. Lewis

1911

- First intercollegiate Greek-letter fraternity founded by African-Americans at a historically black college: Omega Psi Phi (ΩΨΦ), at Howard University
- First African-American police officer in New York City: Samuel J. Battle, following the 1898 incorporation of the five boroughs into the City of New York, and the hiring of three African-American officers in the Brooklyn Police Department. Battle was also the NYPD's first African-American sergeant (1926), lieutenant (1935), and parole commissioner (1941). (See also: Wiley Overton, 1891)
- First African-American attorney admitted to the American Bar Association: Butler R. Wilson (June 1911), William Henry Lewis (August 1911), and William R. Morris (October 1911)
- First African American elected to the Pennsylvania General Assembly: Harry W. Bass (1911).
- Established first Black Parent-Teacher Association in the country (Yonge Street School, Atlanta, Georgia): Selena Sloan Butler
- First woman and first African-American woman field secretary of the National Urban League: Sarah Willie Layton

1913

- First African American inducted into the American College of Surgeons: Daniel Hale Williams

1914

- First African-American military pilot: Eugene Jacques Bullard
- First African American to attend the University of Connecticut, earning his bachelor's degree with honors in 1918: Alan Thacker Busby.

1915

- First African-American alderman of Chicago: Oscar Stanton De Priest
- First African American and first woman to graduate from the University of Hawaiʻi (master's degree in chemistry): Alice Ball
- One of the first African Americans to graduate from Suffolk Law School: Thomas Vreeland Jones (father of Lois Mailou Jones)
- First African American to earn a Ph.D. in physiology (University of Chicago): Julian Herman Lewis
- Possibly the first U.S. Navy Master Diver: John Henry Turpin (see also 1970 (Carl Brashear)
- First African American municipal architect in the United States: Clarence W. Wigington
- First African-American actress to sign a film contract and be a featured performer: Madame Sul-Te-Wan
- First woman and first African-American woman to earn a certificate by the American Teachers Association: Hannah Pierce Lowe

1916

- First African American to play in a Rose Bowl game: Fritz Pollard, Brown University
- First African American to become a colonel in the U.S. Army: Charles Young
- First African-American woman to become a licensed pharmacist: Ella P. Stewart
- First African American to be named a fellow in the Royal Society of London: George Washington Carver
- First African American to earn a Ph.D. in chemistry in the United States (University of Illinois at Urbana-Champaign): St. Elmo Brady

1917

- First African-American woman to win a major sports title: Lucy Diggs Slowe, American Tennis Association
- First African American to earn both a Doctor of Medicine and a Ph.D. (physiology): Julian Herman Lewis

1918

- First American, Black or white, to receive the French award Croix de Guerre with palm: Henry Johnson
- First African-American woman to receive a wartime medical commission when she joined the Red Cross in 1918 during World War I: Mary Louise Brown
- First African-American woman to earn a master's degree in music (from the Chicago Musical College): Nora Holt

1919

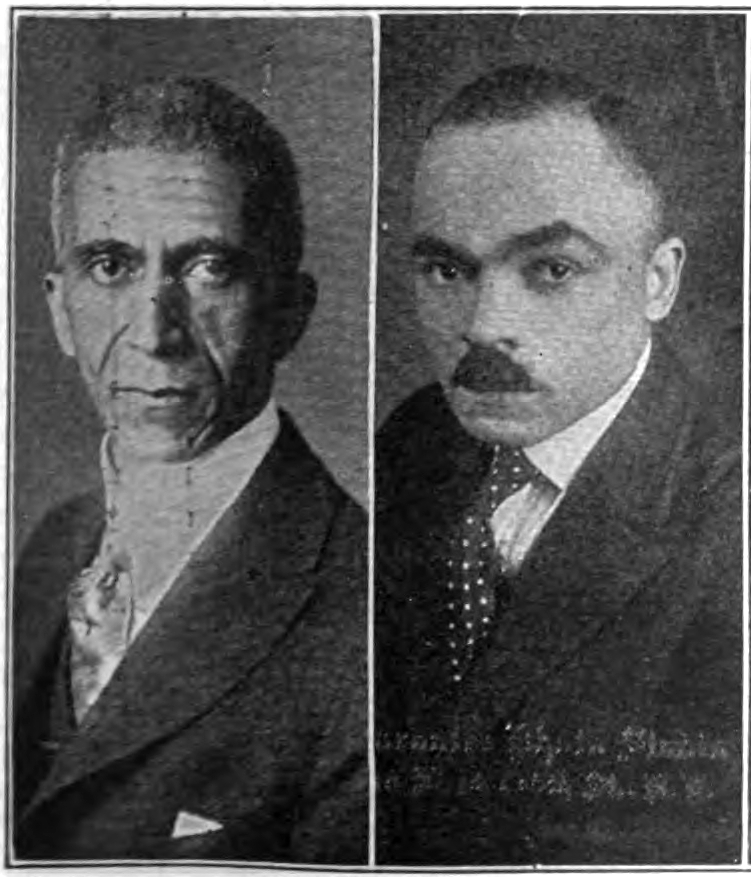
Charles H. Roberts (left) and George W. Harris

- First African-American special agent for the FBI: James Wormley Jones
- First African-American women appointed as police officers: Cora I. Parchment at the New York Police Department (NYPD) and Georgia Ann Robinson, by the Los Angeles Police Department (LAPD)
- First African American to direct a feature film: Oscar Micheaux (The Homesteader)
- First African American on the surgical staff of Harlem Hospital: Louis T. Wright
- First African Americans elected to the New York City Board of Aldermen: Charles H. Roberts and George W. Harris

=== 1920s ===
1920

- First African-American NFL football players: Fritz Pollard (Akron Pros) and Bobby Marshall (Rock Island Independents)
- First African-American bishops of the Methodist Episcopal Church: Robert Elijah Jones and Matthew Wesley Clair.
- First African American admitted into the American Association of Pathologists and Bacteriologists: William Samuel Quinland
- First African American to earn an unlimited mariner's license: Hugh Mulzac
- First African American to earn a Ph.D. in psychology: Francis Sumner, from Clark University

1921

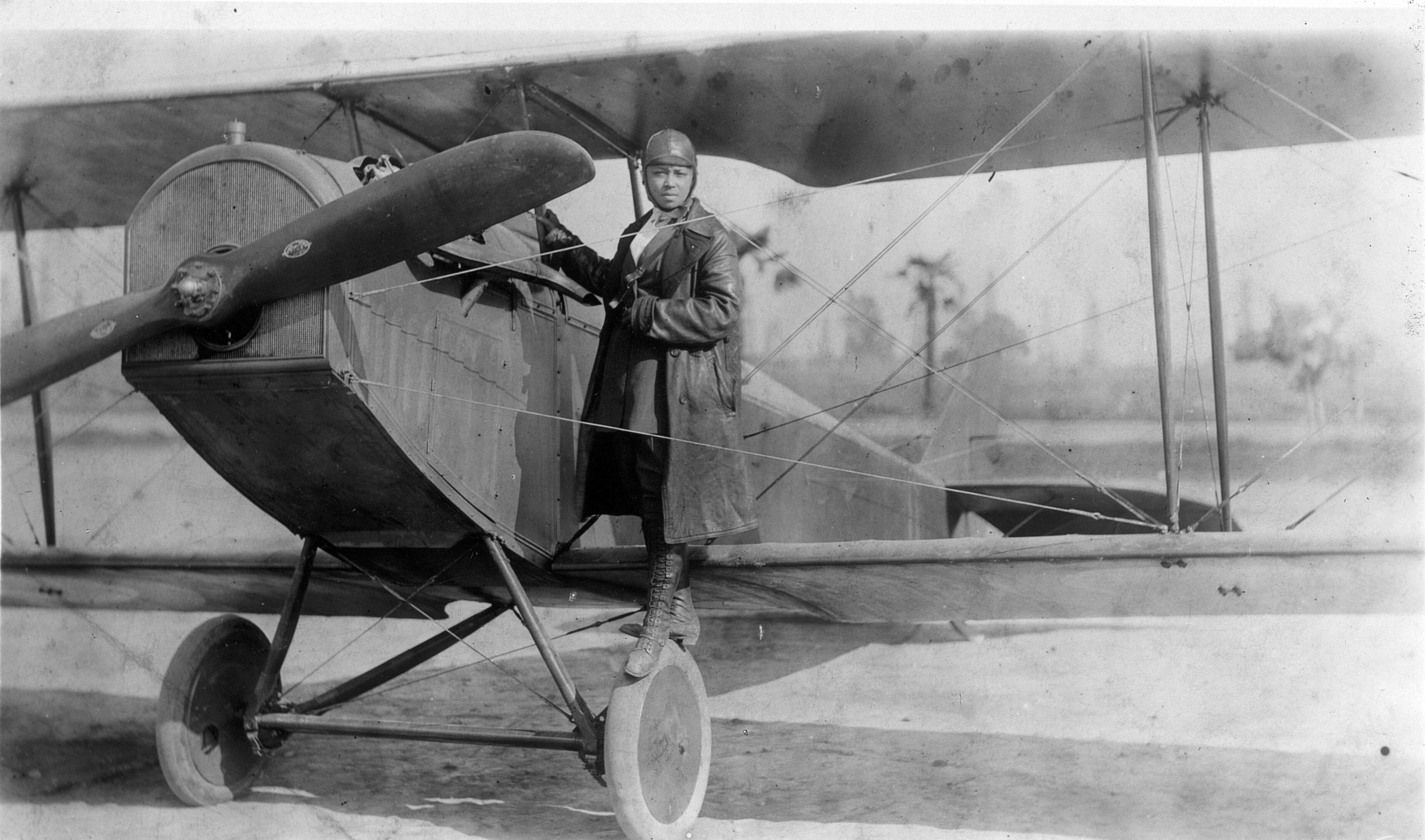
- Bessie Coleman
  First African-American woman to become an aviation pilot, and first American to hold an international pilot license: Bessie Coleman
- First African-American NFL football coach: Fritz Pollard, co-head coach, Akron Pros, while continuing to play running back
- First African-American woman to earn a Ph.D. in the U.S.: Georgiana Rose Simpson, from the University of Chicago
- First African American to earn a Ph.D. in botany in the United States, and the first to earn a doctorate in any field from Cornell University: Thomas Wyatt Turner
- First African American to found a record label: Harry Pace (Black Swan Records)
- First African American to be licensed as a certified public accountant (CPA): John Wesley Cromwell Jr.
- First African-American woman to earn a Ph.D. (economics at the Wharton School of the University of Pennsylvania): Sadie T. M. Alexander
- First African-American student to graduate with a doctorate from Radcliffe College and the first African-American woman in America to receive a PhD in English Philology: Eva Beatrice Dykes

1922

- First African-American sorority established on a predominantly white campus (Butler University in Indianapolis, Indiana): Sigma Gamma Rho
- First woman to be awarded the highest honor by the NAACP, the Spingarn Medal: Mary Burnett Talbert

1923

- First African-American woman to earn a degree in library science: Virginia Proctor Powell Florence. She earned the degree (Bachelor of Library Science) from what is now part of the University of Pittsburgh.
- First African-American woman film producer for the silent crime drama The Flames of Wrath: Maria P. Williams

1924

- First African American to win individual Olympic gold medal: DeHart Hubbard (long jump, 1924 Summer Olympics). (See also: John Taylor, 1908)
- First African American to head a U.S. Veterans Administration hospital (Tuskegee Veterans Hospital): Joseph H. Ward
- First African American woman elected to the national board of the Young Women's Christian Association (YWCA): Elizabeth Ross Haynes
- First African-American woman to publish in the Science journal: Roger Arliner Young
- First woman from Georgia and the first African-American woman in the nation to serve on the National Republican Committee; later in the same year, first woman in U.S. history accorded the floor of the National Republican Convention: Mamie George S. Williams
- First person to graduate from the Howard University art department: Alma Thomas
- First African-American woman to pass the National Board of Medical Examiners: Lillian Atkins Clark

1925

- First African-American Foreign Service Officer: Clifton R. Wharton Sr.
- First African American to earn a Ph.D. in civil engineering: George Maceo Jones, from the University of Michigan
- First African American to earn a Ph.D. in mathematics: Elbert Frank Cox, from Cornell University
- First African American to perform with a major European opera company: Lillian Evanti

1926

- First African-American woman to practice law before the United States Supreme Court: Violette Neatley Anderson
- First African American to become a member of the American Institute of Architects: Paul R. Williams

1927

- First African American to become an officer in the New York Fire Department in New York City: Wesley Augustus Williams.
- First African-American woman to star in a foreign motion picture: Josephine Baker in La Sirène des tropiques.
- First African American certified by the American Board of Otolaryngology: William Harry Barnes
- First African-American woman to perform research at the Marine Biological Laboratory at Woods Hole, Massachusetts: Roger Arliner Young

1928

- First post-Reconstruction African-American elected to U.S. House of Representatives and first African American to be elected to Congress from a Northern state: Oscar Stanton De Priest (Republican; Illinois)
- First African-American woman to serve in a state legislature: Minnie Buckingham Harper, West Virginia

1929

- First African-American sportscaster: Sherman "Jocko" Maxwell (WNJR, Newark, New Jersey)
- First African-American woman in the United States to earn a PhD in education: Jane Ellen McAllister
- First African-American police surgeon with the New York Police Department: Louis T. Wright

=== 1930s ===
1930

- First African American to win a state high school basketball championship: David "Big Dave" DeJernett, star center on an integrated Washington, Indiana team.
- First African-American woman to receive a Guggenheim Fellowship: Nella Larsen

1931

- First African-American composer to have their symphony performed by a leading orchestra: William Grant Still, Symphony No. 1, by Rochester Philharmonic Orchestra
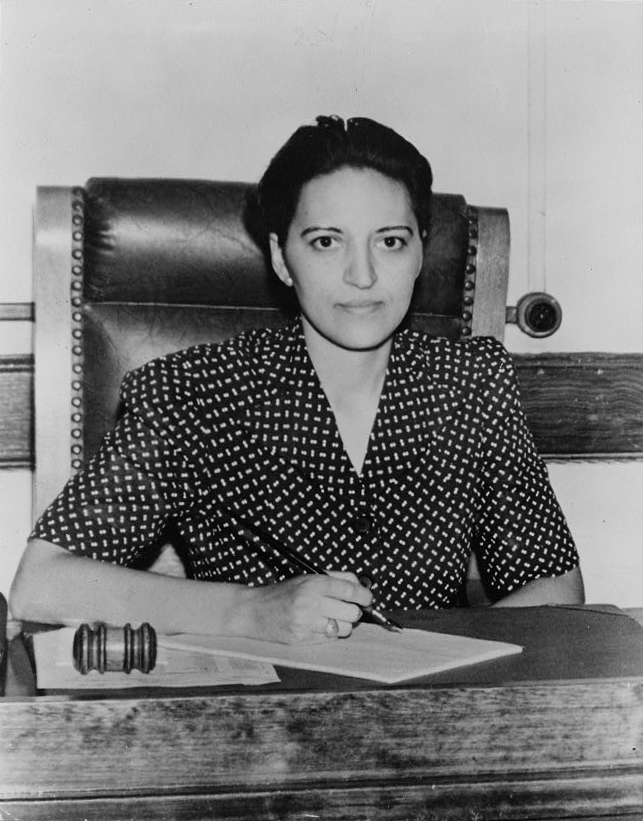
- Jane Matilda Bolin
  First African-American woman to graduate from Yale Law School: Jane Matilda Bolin
- First African-American physician to become a certified Diplomate of the American Board of Obstetrics and Gynecology: Peter Marshall Murray
- First African-American nurse to earn an M.A. in nursing education: Estelle Massey Osborne
- First African-American professor of pharmacology in the United States (Howard University College of Medicine): Arnold Hamilton Maloney Jr.

1932

- First African American on a presidential ticket in the 20th century: James W. Ford (Communist Party USA, as vice-presidential candidate running with William Z. Foster)
- First African-American Ph.D. in anthropology: William Montague Cobb
- First African-American woman to receive a law degree from Fordham University in New York City: Eunice Carter
- First African American to earn a Ph.D. in pathology: Robert Stuart Jason
- First African Americans to successfully complete a transcontinental flight: James Herman Banning and Thomas C. Allen

1933

- First African-American woman to earn a doctorate in psychology (University of Cincinnati): Inez Prosser
- First African-American ophthalmologist certified by the American Board of Ophthalmology: Chester W. Chinn
- First African-American woman to earn a Ph.D. in a natural science (bacteriology): Ruth Ella Moore
- First African-American woman to win the USA Outdoor Track and Field Championships (50-meter dash): Louise Stokes
- First African-American woman to have a symphony played by a major orchestra (Chicago Symphony Orchestra when they played her Symphony in E Minor): Florence Price
- First African American to dance for the Metropolitan Opera and the first to receive a role credit in a Met production: Hemsley Winfield

1934

- First African American elected to the U.S. House of Representatives as a Democrat: Arthur W. Mitchell (Illinois)
- First trade union set up for African-American domestic workers by Dora Lee Jones
- First African American elected as a Fellow of the American College of Surgeons (ACS): Louis T. Wright
- First African American elected to the National Association of Women Painters and Sculptors: Augusta Savage

1935

- First African American certified by the American Board of Dermatology and Syphilology (name changed in 1955 to American Board of Dermatology): Theodore K. Lawless
- First African American certified by the American Board of Obstetrics and Gynecology: Julian Waldo Ross
- First African American certified in roentgenology by the American Board of Radiology: William E. Allen Jr.
- First African American to earn a Ph.D. in agronomy: Major Franklin Spaulding, from the University of Massachusetts Amherst
- First African-American woman to earn a Ph.D. in botany (Iowa State University): Jesse Jarue Mark
- First African-American woman to earn a degree at the University of Oxford (bachelor of literature degree (B.Litt.) in international relations): Merze Tate
- First person in track & field to break or tie four world records in less than one hour: Jesse Owens

1936

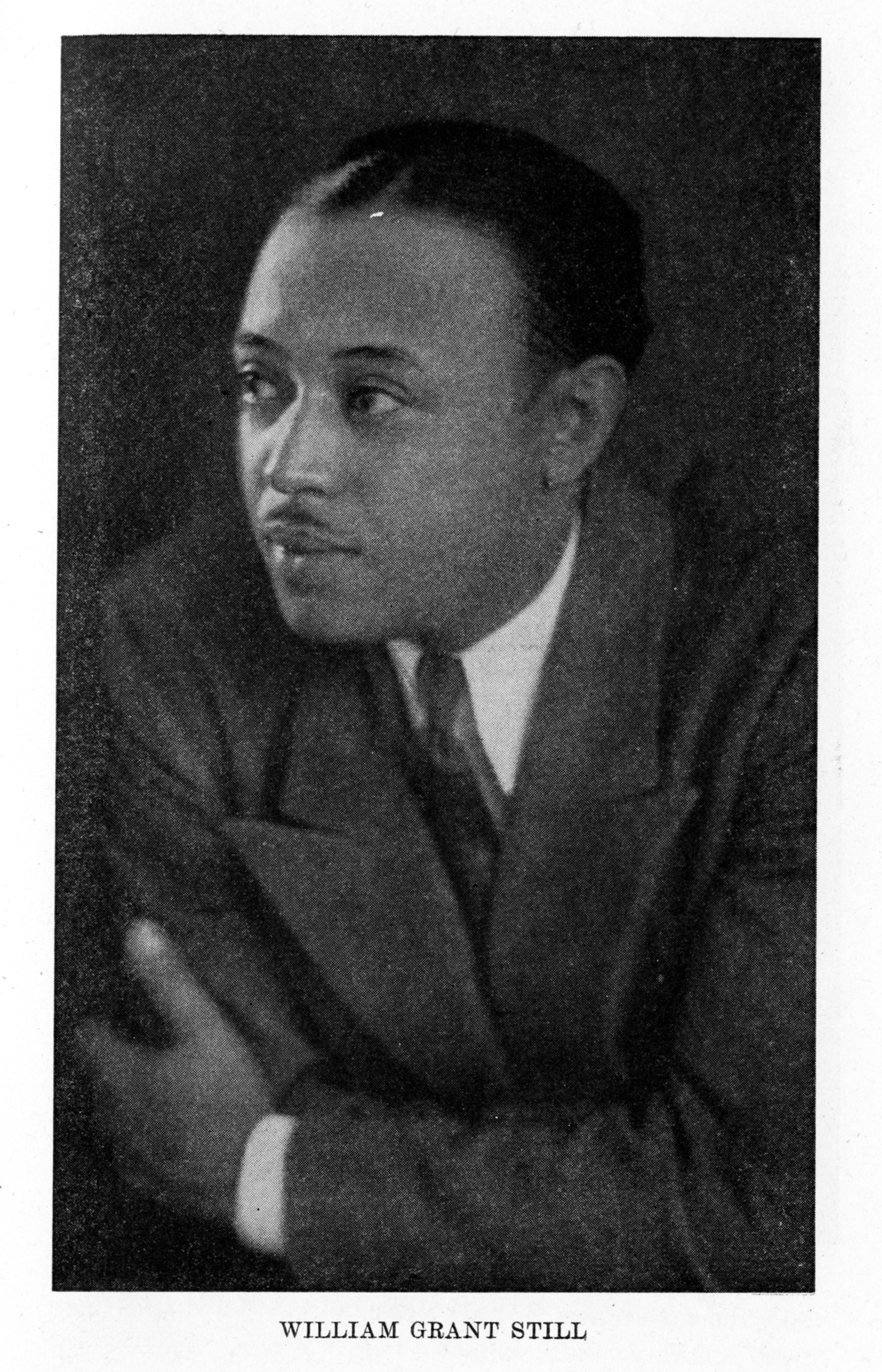
William Grant Still

- First African American to conduct a major U.S. orchestra: William Grant Still (Los Angeles Philharmonic)
- First African-American women selected for the Olympic Games: Tidye Pickett and Louise Stokes. Stokes did not compete; Picket competed in the 80-meter hurdles
- First African-American woman to earn a Ph.D. in Home Economics, and the first African-American woman to earn a Ph.D. from Cornell University: Flemmie Pansy Kittrell
- First African-American physician to be elected a diplomate of the American Board of Urology: Richard Francis Jones
- First American track and field athlete to win four gold medals at a single Olympic Games: Jesse Owens

1937

- First African-American federal magistrate: William H. Hastie (later the first African-American governor of the United States Virgin Islands)
- First African-American woman cartoonist and creator of the Torchy Brown comic strip: Jackie Ormes
- First African American to be admitted to the level of diplomate by the American Board of Pathology: William Samuel Quinland
- First African-American radiologist certified by the American Board of Radiology: Jesse Jerome Peters
- First African American to become a thoracic surgeon: Frederick Douglass Stubbs
- First African American elected to The Explorers Club: Matthew Henson

1938

- First African-American woman federal agency head: Mary McLeod Bethune (National Youth Administration)
- First African-American woman elected to a state legislature: Crystal Bird Fauset (Pennsylvania General Assembly)
- First African-American woman to earn a pilot's license in the United States: Willa Brown
- First African-American pilot to fly airmail in the United States: Grover C. Nash

1939

- First African American to star in her own television program: Ethel Waters, The Ethel Waters Show, on NBC

=== 1940s ===
1940

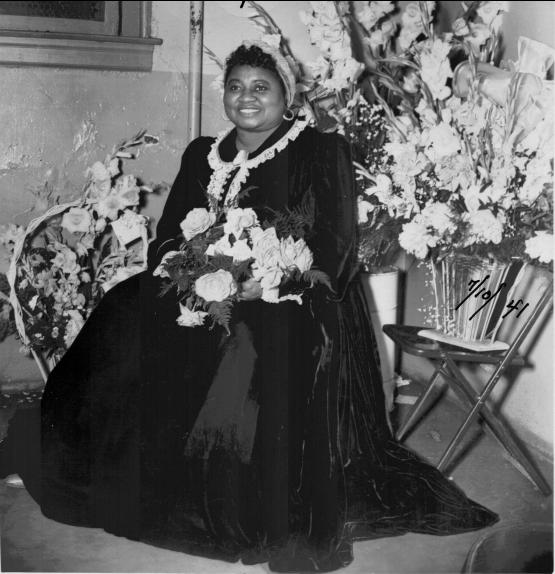
Hattie McDaniel

- First African-American woman to win an Oscar: Hattie McDaniel (Best Supporting Actress, Gone with the Wind, 1939)
- First African American to be portrayed on a U.S. postage stamp: Booker T. Washington
- First African-American flag officer: BG Benjamin O. Davis Sr., U.S. Army (Note: His son, Benjamin O. Davis Jr., was the first African-American general in the United States Air Force.)
- First African American to earn a doctorate in library science: Eliza Atkins Gleason, from the University of Chicago
- First African-American woman to earn a PhD in Zoology (University of Pennsylvania): Roger Arliner Young
- First African-American woman in the United States to earn a Ph.D. in history: Marion Thompson Wright
- First African American selected to be a diplomate of the American Board of Internal Medicine: Henry Arthur Callis
- First African American to set foot on the continent of Antarctica (Little America III): George W. Gibbs Jr.
- First African-American woman to earn a pilot’s license from the Civil Aeronautics Authority: Dorothy Layne McIntyre
- First African-American woman member of American Society of Composers, Authors and Publishers (ASCAP): Florence Price

1941

- First African American to give a White House Command Performance: Josh White
- First African-American woman to earn a Ph.D. in anatomy: Smith Lloyd, from Western Reserve University
- First medical research presentation by an African-American physician given at an American Medical Association convention: Leonidas Berry
- First African American air traffic controller for the Civil Aeronautics Administration: Oscar Holmes
- First African American to serve as an Acting Field Director for the Red Cross: Bess Bolden Walcott

1942

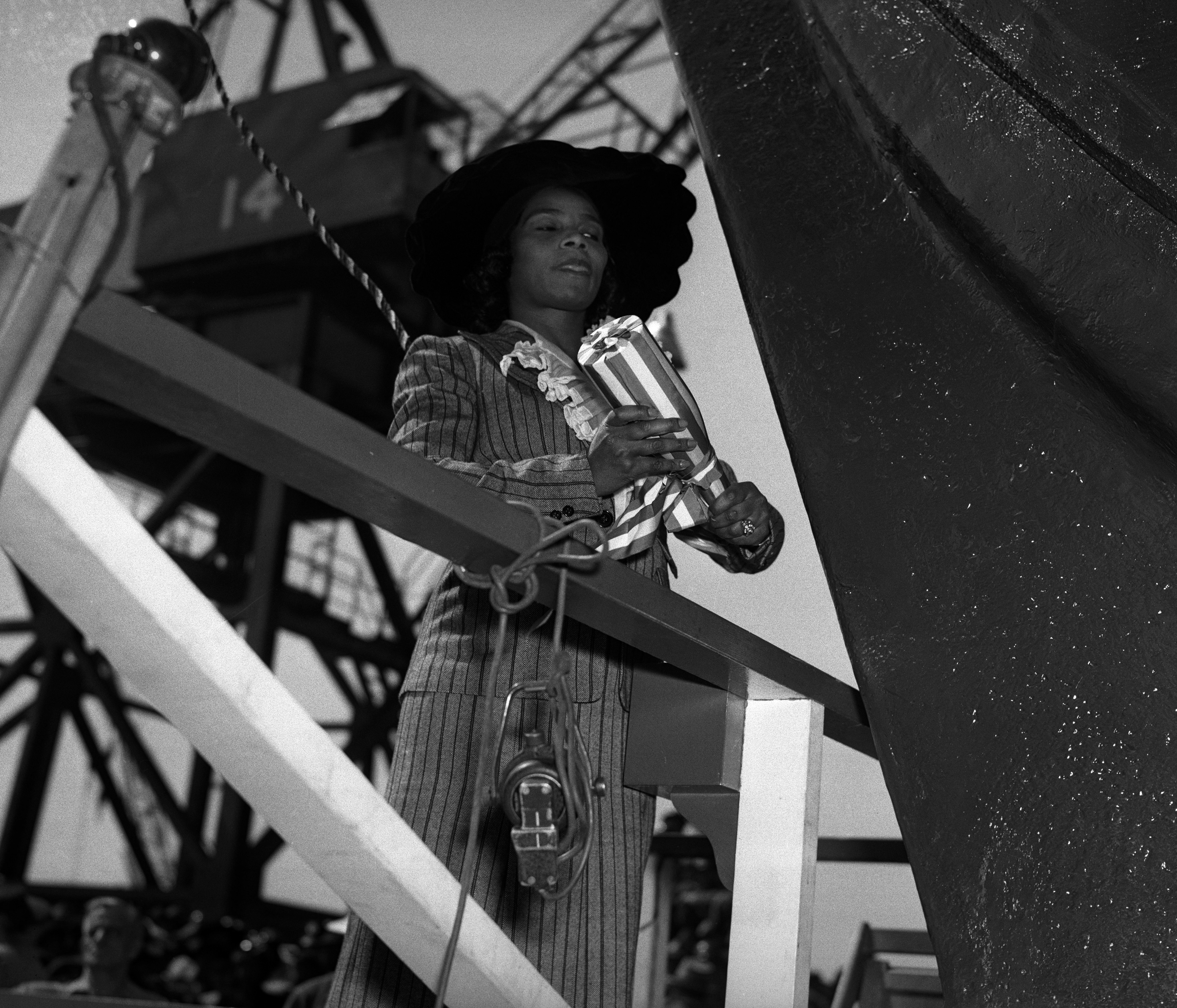
Marian Anderson christens the SS Booker T. Washington, the first large oceangoing ship named for an African American.

- First African American to be awarded the Navy Cross: Doris Miller
- First African-American members of the U.S. Marine Corps: Alfred Masters and Howard P. Perry
- First African-American inadvertently commissioned in the U.S. Navy as a Limited duty Flight instructor: Oscar Holmes
- First African American to captain a U.S. Merchant Marine ship, the SS Booker T. Washington: Hugh Mulzac
- First African American to become an officer in the Civil Air Patrol: Willa Brown
- First African American to earn a doctorate in geology in the United States: Marguerite Williams
- First African American to become a commissioned officer in the U.S. Navy: Bernard W. Robinson
- First African American woman to sign a long-term contract with a major film studio: Lena Horne
- First African-American Women's Army Auxiliary Corps (WAAC) assigned as a commanding officer of what was otherwise an all-white unit: Anna Mac Clarke
- First African-American woman licensed as an architect (Illinois): Beverly Lorraine Greene
- First African American promoted to colonel in the Army Medical Corps: Midian Othello Bousfield

1943

- Martin A. Martin, first African American to become a member of the Trial Bureau of the United States Department of Justice, was sworn in on May 31, 1943.
- First African-American woman to earn a Ph.D. in mathematics: Euphemia Haynes, from Catholic University of America
- First African-American woman to perform a successful open-heart surgery: Myra Adele Logan
- First African American to earn a Ph.D. in chemical engineering in the United States: Harry James Green Jr., from Ohio State University
- First African-American combat fighter pilot to shoot down an enemy aircraft: Charles B. Hall
- First African-American man to have a US warship named after him: Leonard Roy Harmon (USS Harmon (DE-678))
- First African-American woman to be a certified public accountant in the United States: Mary T. Washington
- First African-American woman to earn an unlimited commercial pilot's license: Janet Bragg
- First Black medical unit of the United States Army Nurse Corps to deploy overseas (Liberia) for World War II service: 25th Station Hospital Unit

1944

- First African-American commissioned Line officers in the U.S. Navy: The "Golden Thirteen"
- First African-American commissioned as a U.S. Navy officer from the Naval Reserve Officer Training Corps: Samuel Gravely (Note: Gravely was also the first African American to command a U.S. Navy warship (1962), and the first promoted to the rank of admiral (1971).)
- First female African-American commissioned Navy officers: Harriet Ida Pickens and Frances Wills
- First African American to receive a contract with a major U.S. opera company: Camilla Williams
- First known African-American comic book artist: Matt Baker in Jumbo Comics #69 for Fiction House
- First African-American reporter to attend a U.S. presidential news conference: Harry McAlpin
- First African American to be awarded the Distinguished Flying Cross: Charles B. Hall
- First African American to win the Walter Naumburg Award: Carol Brice
- First African-American woman to be certified as an overseas war correspondent in World War II: Elizabeth Murphy Moss
- First African American to graduate from the United States Merchant Marine Academy: Joseph Banks Williams

1945

- First African-American member of the New York City Opera: Todd Duncan
- First African-American U.S. Marine Corps officer: Frederick C. Branch

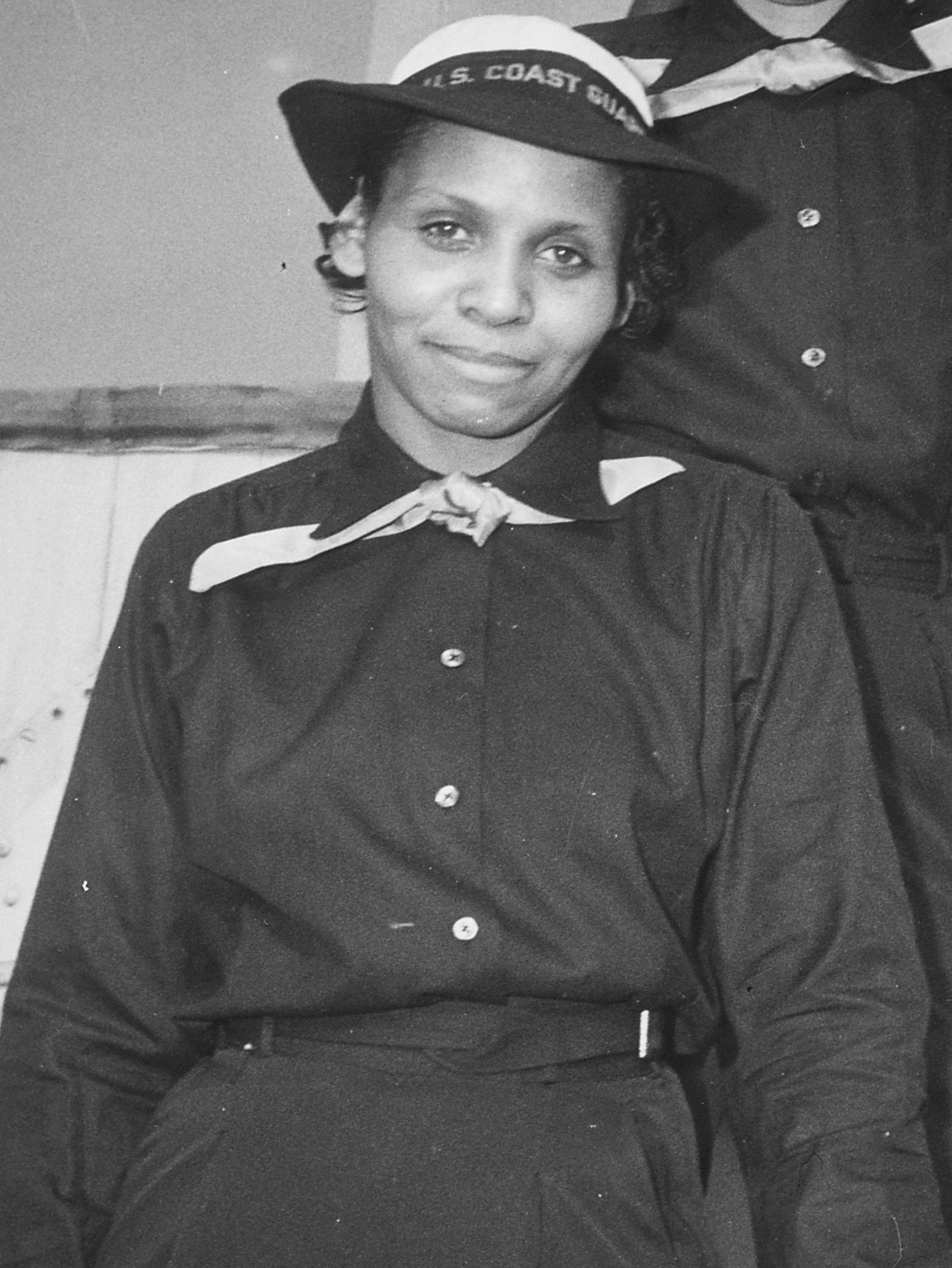
Olivia Hooker

- First African American sworn in as a U.S. Navy nurse: Phyllis Mae Dailey
- First African-American woman to enter the U.S. Coast Guard: Olivia Hooker
- First African American to serve as a federal judge in the United States (U.S. Customs Court now known as the U.S. Court of International Trade): Irvin C. Mollison
- First African American woman commissioned as a nurse for the United States Public Health Service: Alma N. Jackson

1946

- First African American to sign a contract with an NFL team in the modern (post-World War II) era: Kenny Washington
- First African-American radiologist to be elected a member of the Society for Pediatric Radiology: John E. Moseley
- First African-American woman to earn a civil engineering degree (Howard University): Hattie Scott Peterson
- First woman of any race to serve on the federal grand jury in Memphis, Tennessee: Lucie Campbell

1947

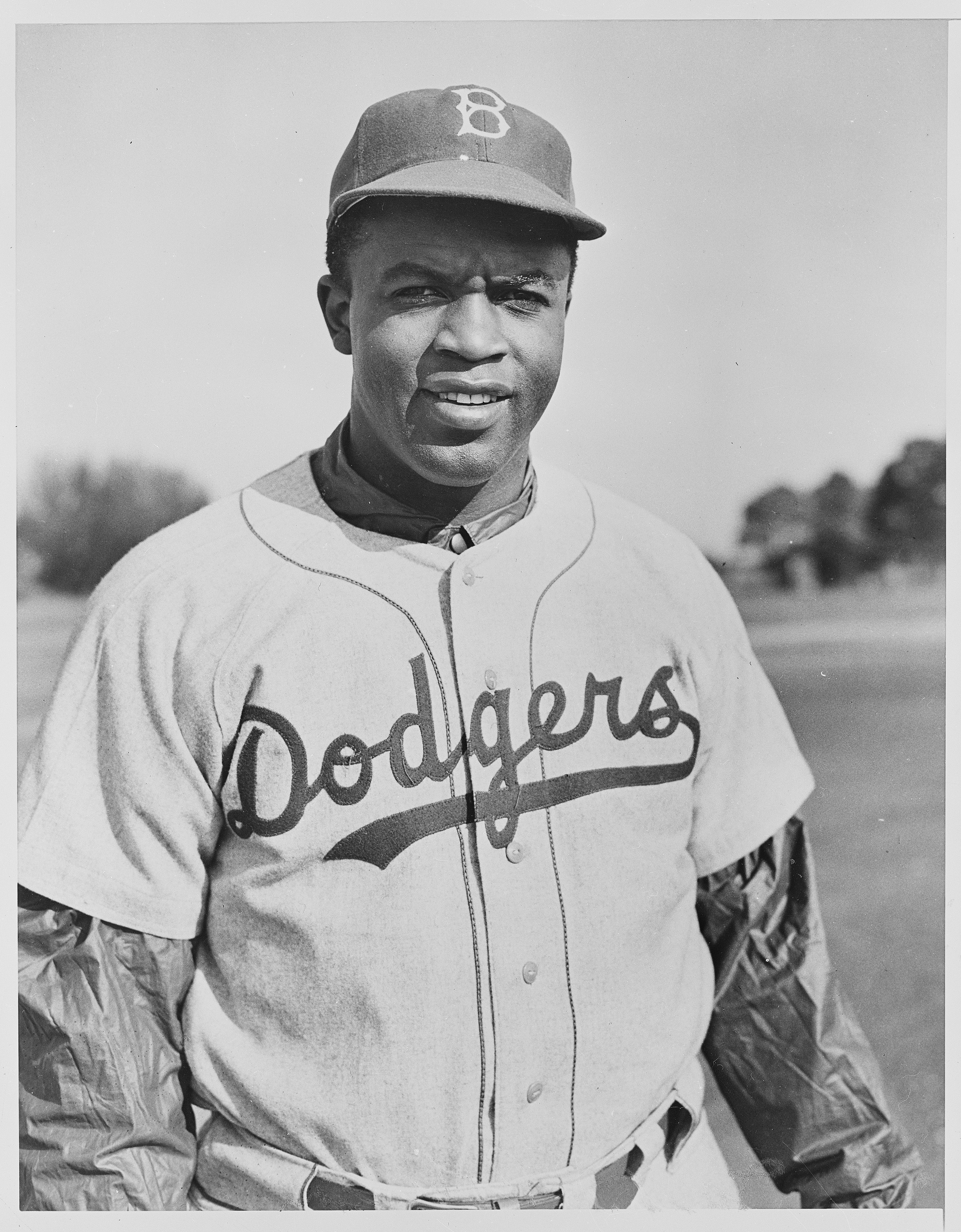
- Jackie Robinson
  First African-American Major League Baseball player of the modern era: Jackie Robinson (Brooklyn Dodgers). (See also: William Edward White, 1879; Moses Fleetwood Walker, 1884)
- First African-American Major League Baseball player in the American League: Larry Doby (Cleveland Indians)
- First African-American consensus college All-American basketball player: Don Barksdale
- First African American to play in a major college football game at an all-white university south of the Mason-Dixon Line, at the University of Virginia: Chester Middlebrook Pierce
- First comic book produced entirely by African Americans: All-Negro Comics
- First African-American full-time faculty member at a predominantly white law school: William Robert Ming (University of Chicago Law School)
- First African-American female member of the U.S. House and Senate press galleries: Alice Allison Dunnigan (See also: 1948)
- First African American faculty member of Springfield College: Harold Amos
- First African American resident at St. Luke's Hospital in Chicago: James E. Bowman
- First African-American woman to receive a Ph.D. in chemistry in the United States: Marie Maynard Daly
- First African-American professor to win tenure at a top-ranked, predominantly white university in the country (at the University of Chicago): Allison Davis
- First African American selected to become a member of the American College of Chest Physicians (CHEST): J. Edmond Bryant
- First African American certified by the American Board of Physical Medicine and Rehabilitation: Harvey F. Davis

1948

- First African-American man to receive an Oscar: James Baskett (Honorary Academy Award for his portrayal of "Uncle Remus" in Disney's Song of the South, 1946) (See also: Sidney Poitier, 1964)
- First African American on an Olympic basketball team and first African-American Olympic gold medal basketball winner: Don Barksdale, in the 1948 Summer Olympics
- First African Americans to play in the Cotton Bowl Classic: Wallace Triplett and Dennis Hoggard
- First African American to design and construct a professional golf course: Bill Powell
- First African American knowingly trained and commissioned as a U.S. Naval aviator: Jesse L. Brown
- First African-American composer to have an opera performed by a major U.S. company: William Grant Still (Troubled Island, New York City Opera)
- First African-American woman to win an Olympic medal (bronze for third place in the 200-meter dash): Audrey Patterson
- First African-American woman to win an Olympic gold medal (high jump): Alice Coachman
- First African American since Reconstruction to enroll at a traditionally white university of the South: Silas Hunt (University of Arkansas Law School) (Note: L. Clifford Davis applied to the law school in 1946, and after several failed attempts was granted admission in September 1947, but was unable to enroll in classes. Hunt later enrolled on February 2, 1948.)
- First known African-American star of a regularly scheduled network television series: Bob Howard, The Bob Howard Show (Note: While considered a network for regulatory reasons, CBS TV was viewable only locally in 1948. By 1956, CBS and other networks were viewable nationwide.) (See also: 1956)

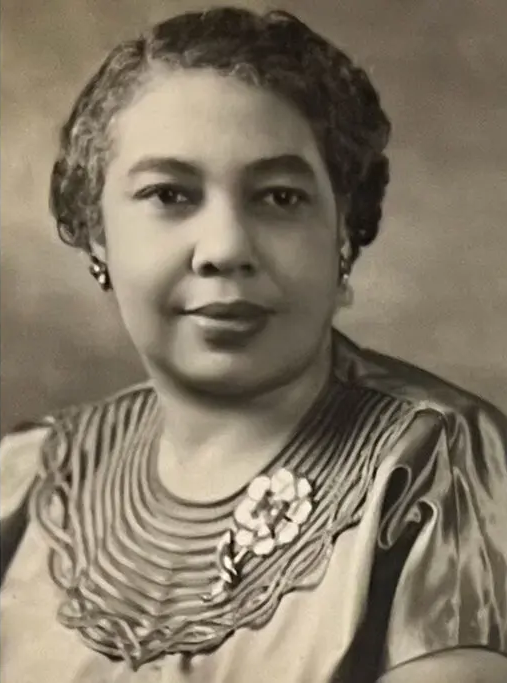
Alice Allison Dunnigan

- First African-American man to graduate from Oregon State College: William Tebeau
- First African-American female reporter to travel with a U.S. president (Harry S. Truman's election campaign): Alice Allison Dunnigan (See also: 1947)
- First African American in the regular United States Army Nurse Corps after it was desegregated: Nancy Leftenant-Colon
- First clinician to investigate the treatment of humans with Aureomycin: Louis T. Wright
- First African American to serve as a Supreme Court law clerk: William Thaddeus Coleman Jr.
- First African-American nurse elected to the board of directors of a state nursing association (Florida): Mary Elizabeth Carnegie
- First African American to play with a major American orchestra (double bassist with the Los Angeles Philharmonic): Henry Lewis
- First African-American enlisted woman to be sworn into the regular Navy: Edna Young
- First African American member of the American Society of Civil Engineers (ASCE): Howard P. Grant
- First woman and first African-American woman to earn a Ph.D. in economics from Yale University: Phyllis Ann Wallace

1949

- First African-American graduate of the U.S. Naval Academy: Wesley Brown
- First African American to chair a committee of the United States Congress: Representative William Dawson (D-IL).
- First African American to hold the rank of Ambassador of the United States: Edward R. Dudley, ambassador, and previously minister, to Liberia (See also: 1869)
- First African American to win an MVP award in Major League Baseball: Jackie Robinson (Brooklyn Dodgers, National League) (See also: Elston Howard, 1963)
- First African-American-owned and -operated radio station: WERD, established October 3, 1949, in Atlanta, Georgia by Jesse B. Blayton Sr.
- First African-American woman president of an NAACP chapter nationwide: Florence LeSueur of Boston's NAACP chapter.
- First African-American women to earn a doctor of veterinary medicine degree: Jane Hinton and Alfreda Johnson Webb
- First African American to sing at a U.S. presidential inauguration (Harry S. Truman): Dorothy Maynor
- First African-American woman to earn a Ph.D. in entomology: Margaret S. Collins
- First African American to sit in the House of Delegates of the American Medical Association, representing the Medical Society of the County of New York: Peter Marshall Murray
- First African American certified by the American Board of Orthopaedic Surgery: J. Robert Gladden
- First African American United States circuit judge to serve on the United States Court of Appeals for the Third Circuit: William H. Hastie
- First African American jet pilot instructor (Williams Air Force Base in Arizona): John L. Whitehead Jr.

=== 1950s ===
1950

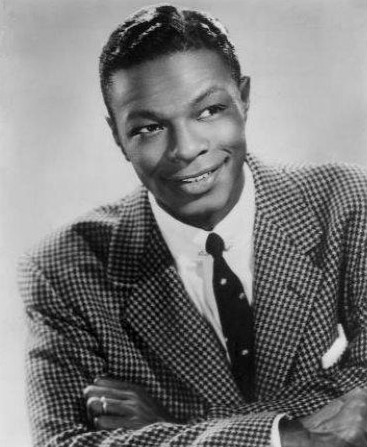
- Nat King Cole
  First African American to win a Tony Award: Juanita Hall (Best Featured Actress in a Musical, South Pacific)
- First African American to win a Pulitzer Prize: Gwendolyn Brooks (book of poetry, Annie Allen, 1949)
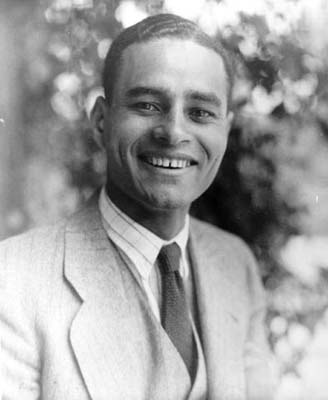
- Ralph Bunche
  First African American to win the Nobel Peace Prize: Ralph Bunche
- First African American to receive a "lifetime" appointment as federal judge: William H. Hastie, U.S. Court of Appeals for the Third Circuit
- First African-American woman to compete on the world tennis tour: Althea Gibson
- First African-American solo singer to have a #1 hit on the Billboard charts: Nat King Cole ("Mona Lisa"), topped "Best Sellers in Stores" chart on July 15 (See also: Mills Brothers, 1943; Count Basie, 1947; Tommy Edwards, 1958; The Platters, 1959)
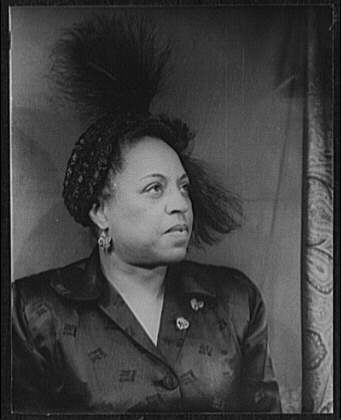
- Edith S. Sampson
  First African-American delegate to the United Nations: Edith S. Sampson (See also: 1961)
- First African-American NBA basketball players: Nat "Sweetwater" Clifton (New York Knicks), Chuck Cooper (Boston Celtics), and Earl Lloyd (Washington Capitols). Note: Harold Hunter was the first to sign an NBA contract, signing with the Washington Capitols on April 26, 1950. However, he was cut from the team during training camp and did not play professionally. (Note: Clifton was the first to sign an NBA contract and subsequently play, Cooper was the first to be drafted by an NBA team, and Lloyd was the first to play in an NBA regular-season game because his team's opening game was one day before the others.) (See also: 1902)
- First African American elected a Fellow in the American College of Physicians: Edward E. Holloway
- First African-American woman certified by the American Board of Dermatology and Syphilology (name changed in 1955 to American Board of Dermatology): Hilda G. Straker
- First African-American woman admitted to the American College of Surgeons: Helen Octavia Dickens
- First African American to earn a PhD in metallurgical engineering: Frank Crossley

1951

- First African-American named to the College Football Hall of Fame: Duke Slater, University of Iowa (1918–1921)
- First African-American quarterback to become a regular starter for a professional football team: Bernie Custis (Hamilton Tiger-Cats)
- First African-American woman to earn a Ph.D. in Art and the History of Art (Ohio State University): Samella Lewis
- First African-American woman to play Wimbledon: Althea Gibson

1952

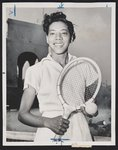
- Althea Gibson
  First African-American woman elected to a U.S. state senate: Cora Brown (Michigan)
- First African-American U.S. Marine Corps aviator: Frank E. Petersen
- First African-American woman to be nominated for a national political office: Charlotta Bass, Vice President (Progressive Party) (See also: 2000, 2020)
- First African-American baseball player to appear in or win a College World Series: Don Eaddy
- First African American to earn a doctoral degree from Harvard's Division of Medical Sciences: Harold Amos
- First African-American woman to receive a Ford Foundation science fellowship to study abroad: Mary Logan Reddick
- First African-American tenured professor in the University of California system and the first tenured African-American faculty member in a STEM field at a top-ranked, predominantly white institution in the United States: Joseph Thomas Gier
- First African American woman to earn a doctorate in Religious Education: Olivia P. Stokes
- First African-American woman to earn a Ph.D. in cultural anthropology (Cornell University): Manet Helen Fowler
- First African-American woman to clerk for the U.S. Court of Appeals for Veterans Claims: Janene D. Jackson

1953

- First African-American basketball player to play in the NBA All-Star Game: Don Barksdale in the 1953 NBA All-Star Game
- First African-American quarterback to play in the National Football League during the modern (post-World War II) era: Willie Thrower (Chicago Bears)
- First African American elected president of the National Health Council: Albert Walker Dent
- First African-American physician elected a diplomate of the American Board of Neurosurgery: Clarence Sumner Greene
- One of the first two African-American women on the faculty at a southern medical school and the first African American on the staff of the Louisville Children's Hospital and on the faculty at the University of Louisville School of Medicine: Grace Marilynn James
- First African American to sing at La Scala, Milan, Italy: Mattiwilda Dobbs
- First African-American driver in NASCAR: Wendell Scott (See also: 2015)
- First African American man to perform at the Metropolitan Opera: Robert McFerrin
- First woman to play baseball in the Negro leagues when she signed with the Indianapolis Clowns to play second base: Toni Stone

1954

- First African-American U.S. Navy Diver: Carl Brashear
- First individual African-American woman as subject on the cover of Life magazine: Dorothy Dandridge, November 1, 1954
- First African-American page for the U.S. Supreme Court, and first to be enrolled in the Capitol Page School: Charles V. Bush
- First African American enrolled in the University of Arkansas for Medical Sciences, Little Rock: Samuel L. Kountz
- First African-American woman to earn a Ph.D. in political science: Jewel Prestage
- First African-American woman to join the U.S. Army Corps of Engineers: Hattie Scott Peterson
- First African-American woman to become a licensed architect (New York): Norma Merrick Sklarek
- First African American general officer of the U.S. Air Force (Brigadier General): Benjamin O. Davis, Jr.

1955

- First African-American member of the Metropolitan Opera: Marian Anderson
- First African-American male dancer in a major ballet company: Arthur Mitchell (New York City Ballet); also first African-American principal dancer of a major ballet company (NYCB), 1956. (See also: 1969)
- First African-American female dancer in a major ballet company (Ballet Russe de Monte Carlo): Raven Wilkinson
- First African-American pilot of a scheduled U.S. airline: August Martin (cargo airline Seaboard & Western Airlines) (See also: 1964)
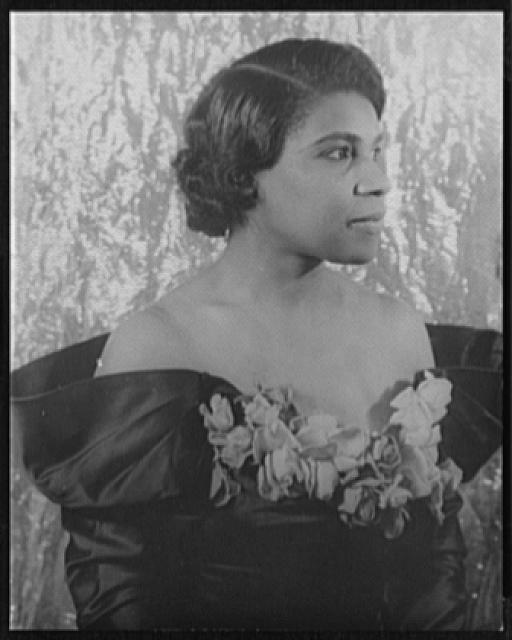
- Marian Anderson
  First African American to serve as a presidential executive assistant: E. Frederic Morrow, appointed by President Eisenhower as Administrative Officer for Special Projects.
- First African-American woman to earn a Ph.D. in mathematics education: Angie Turner King, from the University of Pittsburgh
- First African American certified by the American Board of Cardiovascular Diseases: Edward E. Holloway
- First African-American woman to earn a doctorate in pharmacology: Dolores Cooper Shockley
- First African American elected to the national board of the American Institute of Chemists (AIC): Lloyd Hall
- First African American nominated for the Academy Award for Best Actress: Dorothy Dandridge
- First African-American woman appointed as an assistant United States attorney for the United States District Court for the Northern District of Illinois: Jewel Lafontant
- First African-American woman physician in the U.S. Army: Clotilde Dent Bowen
- First African American faculty member at the Massachusetts Institute of Technology (MIT): Joseph R. Applegate

1956

- First African-American star of a nationwide network TV show: Nat King Cole of The Nat King Cole Show, NBC (See also: 1948)
- First African American to break the color barrier in a bowl game in the Deep South: Bobby Grier (Pittsburgh Panthers in the 1956 Sugar Bowl)
- First African-American Wimbledon tennis champion: Althea Gibson (doubles, with Englishwoman Angela Buxton); also first African American to win a Grand Slam event (French Open).
- First African-American U.S. Secret Service agent: Charles Gittens
- First African American to win the Cy Young Award as the top pitcher in Major League Baseball, in the award's inaugural year: Don Newcombe (Brooklyn Dodgers)
- First African-American woman to become president of a four-year, fully accredited liberal arts college: Willa Beatrice Player (Bennett College)
- First African American to earn a Ph.D. in dairy technology: Emmett Bassett, from the Ohio State University
- First African-American member of the United States Army Chorus: George Shirley
- First African American be named head coach of the U.S. Olympic Women's Track and Field Team: Nell Jackson
- First African American to serve as assistant editor of Poetry: A Magazine of Verse: Margaret Danner
- First African-American woman to play in a national championship conducted by the United States Golf Association (USGA): Ann Gregory
- First African-American woman to earn a degree from Louisiana State University (master’s degree in education): Pearl Payne
- First African American to earn a Ph.D. at the Eastman School of Music: George Walker
- First African American Federal Bureau of Investigation (FBI) special agent appointed in Miami, Florida and across the Deep South: Leo James McClairen

1957

- First African-American woman Wimbledon Tennis Champion, first African-American woman to be ranked number one in the world, first African-American woman on the cover of Time magazine, and first woman on the cover of Sports Illustrated magazine: Althea Gibson
- First African-American assistant coach in the NFL: Lowell W. Perry (See also: 1966)

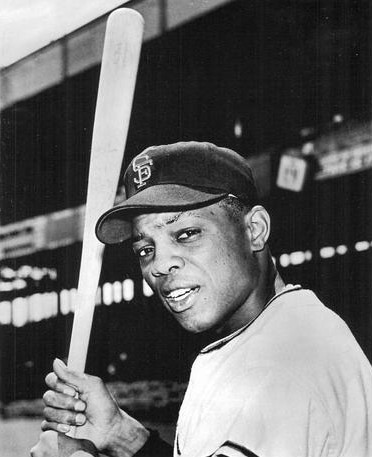
Willie Mays

- First African American to win Major League Baseball's Gold Glove, in the award's inaugural year: Willie Mays (New York Giants) (Note: While two black players won Gold Gloves that year, only Mays was African American. The other, Minnie Miñoso, was Afro Cuban.)
- First African American to work as a botanist at the United States National Arboretum: Roland Jefferson
- First African-American woman to play professional roller derby: Darlene Anderson
- First African American to be elected to the American Institute of Architects College of Fellows (FAIA): Paul R. Williams
- First African-American pilot of a regularly scheduled commercial airline in the United States (New York Airways hired in 1956): Perry H. Young Jr.
- First African-American woman appointed as the special associate general counsel of the U.S. Post Office: Cora Brown
- First African-American golfer to defeat white players in a PGA co-sponsored tournament (Long Beach Open): Charlie Sifford

1958

- First African-American flight attendant: Ruth Carol Taylor (Mohawk Airlines)
- First African American to reach number-one on the Billboard Hot 100: Tommy Edwards ("It's All in the Game")
- NASA’s first African-American woman engineer: Mary Jackson
- First African American to become a member of the International Skeletal Society: Gadson Jack Tarlton Jr.
- First African American to graduate from the U.S. Air Force Test Pilot School: John L. Whitehead Jr.
- First Black player in the National Hockey League (NHL) (Made his debut with the Boston Bruins on January 18):Willie O'Ree (Note: The NHL had fielded black players for more than 20 years, with the first being Willie O'Ree in 1958, but all past black players were Black Canadians and not African Americans. In 1996, Mike Grier (Edmonton Oilers) became the first to have been both born and exclusively trained in the U.S., per Allen, Kevin (January 14, 2008). "Willie O'Ree still blazing way in NHL 50 years later". USA Today. Archived from the original on October 26, 2012.)

1959

- First African-American Grammy Award winners, in the award's inaugural year: Ella Fitzgerald and Count Basie (two awards each)

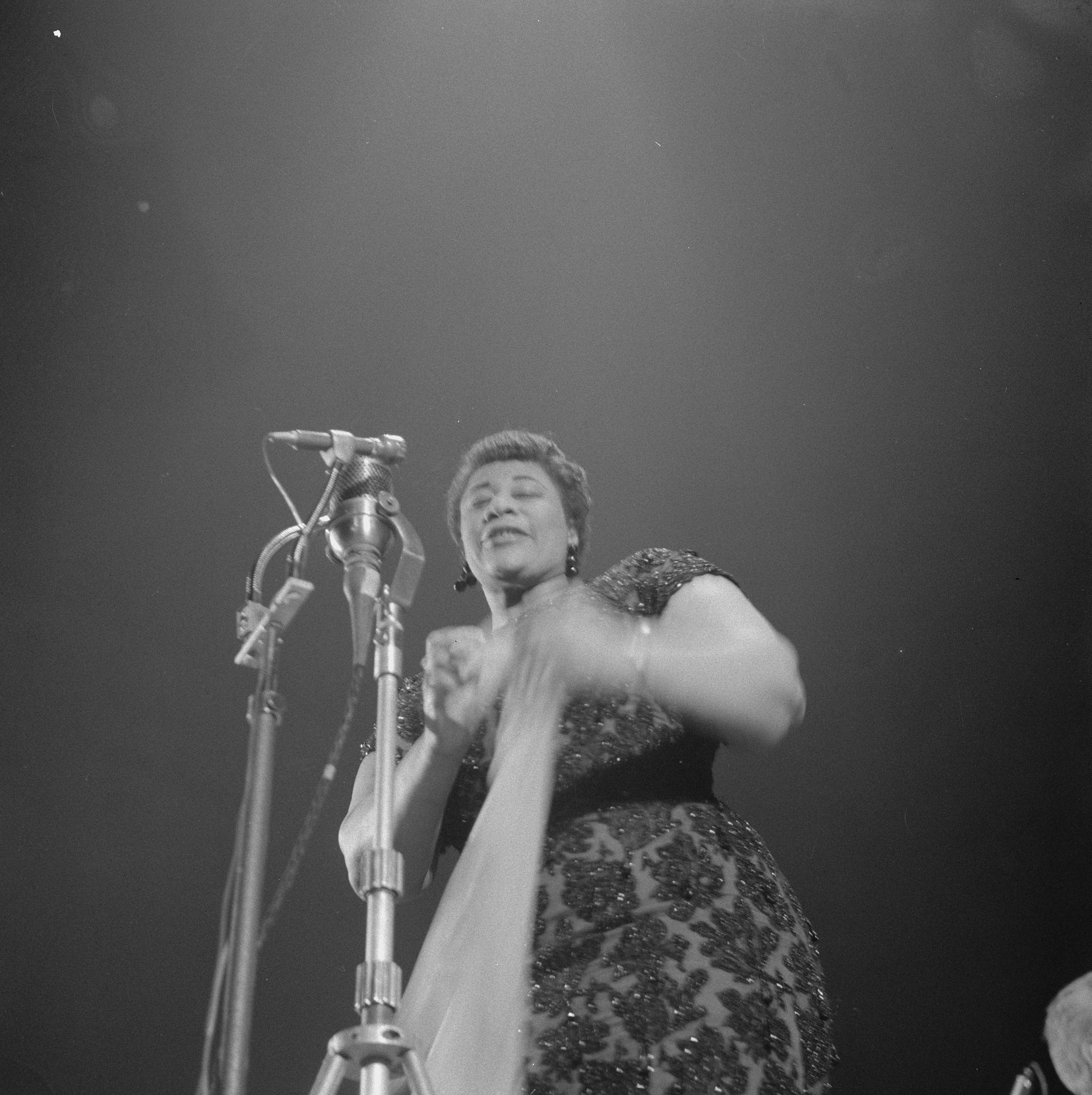
Ella Fitzgerald

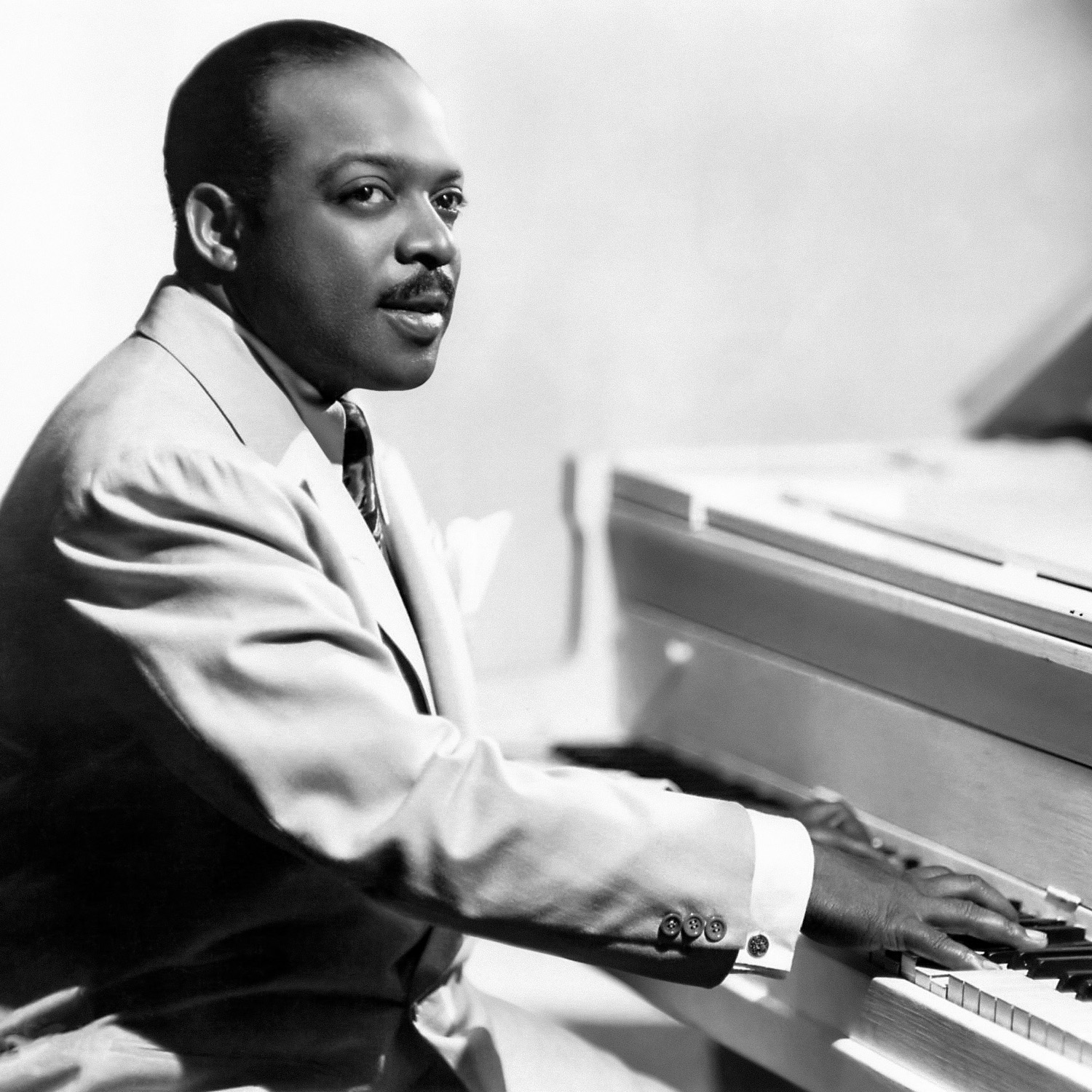
Count Basie

- First African-American television journalist: Louis Lomax
- First African American to win a major national player of the year award in college basketball: Oscar Robertson, USBWA Player of the Year (Note: In 1998, the award would be renamed the Oscar Robertson Trophy after its first recipient.) (in that award's inaugural year)
- First African-American woman to become a member of the American Institute of Architects (AIA): Norma Merrick Sklarek
- First African-American woman surgeon to become a fellow of the American College of Surgeons: Dorothy Lavinia Brown
- First African American named as an examiner for the American Board of Ophthalmology: Howard Phillip Venable
- First African American to appear on television with what is believed to be a natural African hair style (CBS culture series Camera Three): Cicely Tyson
- First African American elected president of the American Association of Physical Anthropologists (AAPA): William Montague Cobb

=== 1960s ===
1960

- First African American to work as a flight attendant on a commercial airline for a southern carrier for Capital Airlines: Patricia Banks Edmiston
- First African American to earn a Ph.D. in meteorology: Charles E. Anderson, from the Massachusetts Institute of Technology
- First African American to attend a whites-only elementary school in the Deep South: Ruby Bridges (William Frantz Elementary School during the New Orleans school desegregation crisis)

1961

- First African American to win the Heisman Trophy: Ernie Davis
- First African American weathercaster: Dianne White Clatto
- First African American to serve on a U.S. district court: James Benton Parsons, appointed by President John F. Kennedy to the U.S. District Court for the Northern District of Illinois
- First African American to serve on the United States District Court for the Eastern District of Michigan: Wade H. McCree
- First African-American delegate to the North Atlantic Treaty Organization: Edith S. Sampson (See also: 1950)
- First African American to go over Niagara Falls: Nathan Boya a.k.a. William FitzGerald
- First African American to join the PGA Tour: Charlie Sifford
- First African-American singer to maintain a sustained relationship with the Metropolitan Opera: Leontyne Price
- First African American to perform a kidney transplant and made medical history by performing the first kidney transplant using a non-twin donor: Samuel L. Kountz
- First African American to be appointed as the U.S. representative to the International Atomic Energy Agency: George W. Reed
- First African American to earn a Ph.D. in astronomy: Harvey Washington Banks, from Georgetown University
- First African-American officer to command a U.S. Navy ship: Samuel L. Gravely Jr. (USS Theodore E. Chandler (DD-717))
- First African American United States circuit judge to serve on the United States Court of Appeals for the Second Circuit: Thurgood Marshall
- First African American singer to perform at Germany’s Bayreuth Festival: Grace Bumbry
- First African-American man to receive a contract from the Metropolitan Opera and the second Black male to perform there: George Shirley

1962

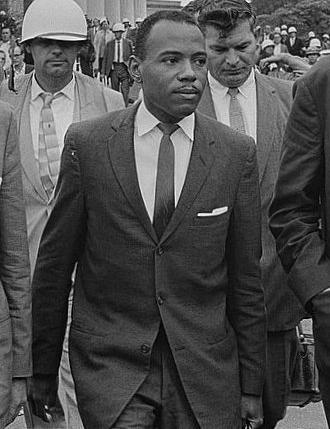
- James Meredith
  First African American to be inducted into the Baseball Hall of Fame: Jackie Robinson (See also: Satchel Paige, 1971)
- First African-American coach in Major League Baseball: John Jordan "Buck" O'Neil (Chicago Cubs)
- First African-American state attorney general: Edward Brooke (Massachusetts) (See also: 1966)
- First African-American student admitted to the University of Mississippi: James Meredith
- First African-American Navy Seal: William Goines
- First African-American woman certified by the American Board of Radiology: Sarah Ewell Payton
- First African American and youngest person appointed as commissioner of the Federal Trade Commission: A. Leon Higginbotham Jr.
- First African American to work as a news correspondent for an American television network (ABC) as a United Nations reporter: Malvin Russell Goode

1963

- First African-American bank examiner for the United States Department of the Treasury: Roland Burris
- First African American to graduate from the University of Mississippi: James Meredith
- First African-American named as Time magazine's Man of the Year: Martin Luther King Jr.
- First African American to win a NASCAR Grand National event: Wendell Scott
- First African-American police officer of the NYPD to be named a precinct commander: Lloyd Sealy, commander of the NYPD's 28th Precinct in Harlem.
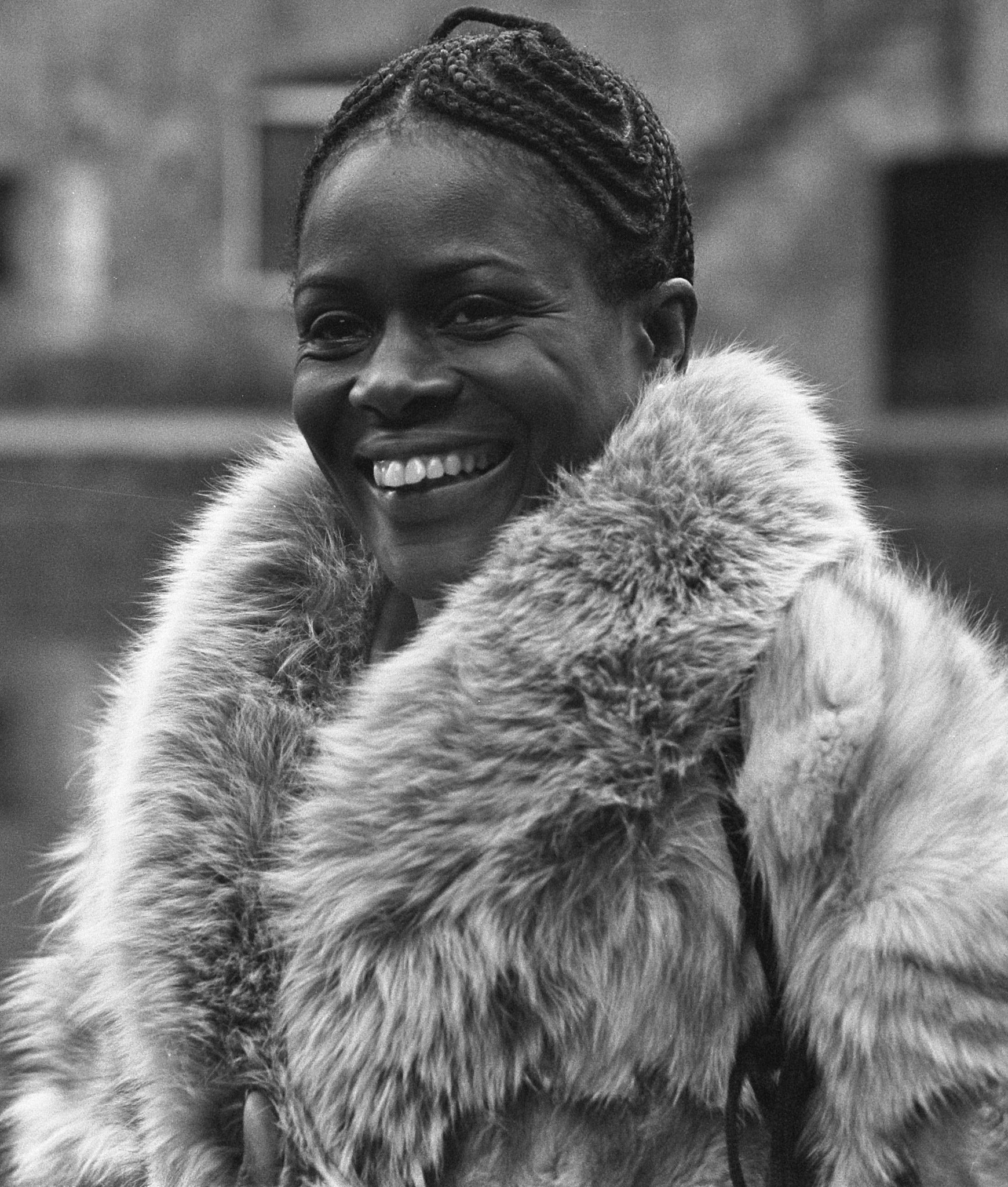
- Cicely Tyson
  First African American to be named American League MVP: Elston Howard (New York Yankees) (See also: Jackie Robinson, 1949)
- First African-American chess master: Walter Harris
- First African American to appear as a series regular on a primetime dramatic television series: Cicely Tyson, East Side/West Side (CBS).
- First African American to be nominated for a Primetime Emmy Award: Diahann Carroll, for Outstanding Single Performance by an Actress in a Lead Role, for the episode "A Horse Has a Big Head, Let Him Worry" of Naked City (See also: 1968)
- First African Americans inducted into the Basketball Hall of Fame: New York Renaissance, inducted as a team (See also: Bob Douglas, 1972; Bill Russell, 1975; Clarence Gaines, 1982)
- First African American to graduate from the U.S. Air Force Academy: Charles V. Bush
- First African-American man to obtain a Ph.D. in geology: Mack Gipson
- First African-American woman chemist hired by the National Bureau of Standards: Reatha Clark King

1964

- First African American to join the Ladies Professional Golf Association: Althea Gibson
- First African-American pilot for a major commercial airline: David E. Harris, American Airlines (Note: Harris's milestone came a year after Marlon Green, who had been rejected as a Continental Airlines applicant in 1957, won the United States Supreme Court case "Colorado Anti-Discrimination Commission v. Continental Airlines, Inc. 372 U.S. 714 no. 146", which found Green had been unlawfully discriminated against.) (See also: 1955 and Marlon Green)
- First African-American man to win an Oscar: Sidney Poitier (Best Actor, Lilies of the Field, 1963)
- First movie with African-American interracial marriage: One Potato, Two Potato, actors Bernie Hamilton and Barbara Barrie, written by Orville H. Hampton, Raphael Hayes, directed by Larry Peerce
- First African-American baseball player to be named the Major League Baseball World Series MVP: Bob Gibson, St. Louis Cardinals
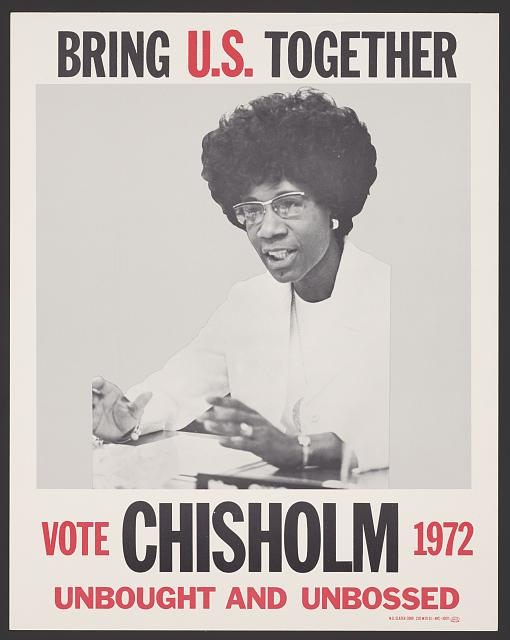
- Shirley Chisholm
  First African-American woman to graduate from the University of San Francisco: Dr. Mary Edna Davidson
- First African American promoted to lieutenant colonel in the Army Nurse Corps: Margaret E. Bailey
- First African-American woman to earn a contract with an American national symphony – with the Pittsburgh Symphony Orchestra as principal keyboardist: Patricia Prattis Jennings
- First African-American woman to be awarded the Presidential Medal of Freedom: Lena Frances Edwards
- First African-American president of the Actors' Equity Association: Frederick O'Neal
- First African American to win a PGA Tour event (Waco Turner Open): Pete Brown
- First African American to serve on the United States District Court for the District of Columbia: Spottswood W. Robinson III
- First African American to serve on the United States District Court for the Eastern District of Pennsylvania: A. Leon Higginbotham Jr.
- First African-American woman and first woman appointed to the U.S. Commission on Civil Rights: Frankie Muse Freeman
- First African-American woman appointed to the National Advisory General Medical Services (NAGMS) Council, an advisory board for NIGMS: Geraldine Pittman Woods
- First woman and first African-American woman prosthodontist with a PhD degree (Physiology, Northwestern University): Jeanne Sinkford

1965

- First African-American nationally syndicated cartoonist: Morrie Turner (Wee Pals)
- First African-American title character of a comic book series: Lobo (Dell Comics). (Note: The first black superhero, Marvel's Black Panther, introduced in Fantastic Four #52 (July 1966), is African, not African American. This is also true of the first black character to star in his own mainstream comic-book feature, Waku, Prince of the Bantu, who headlined one of four features in the multiple-character omnibus series Jungle Tales (September 1954 – September 1955), from Marvel's 1950s predecessor, Atlas Comics.) (See also: The Falcon, 1969, and Luke Cage, 1972)
- First African-American star of a network television drama: Bill Cosby, I Spy (co-star with Robert Culp)
- First African-American cast member of a daytime soap opera: Micki Grant who played Peggy Nolan Harris on Another World until 1972.
- First African-American Playboy Playmate centerfold: Jennifer Jackson (March issue)
- First African-American U.S. Air Force General: Benjamin Oliver Davis Jr. (Three-star General)
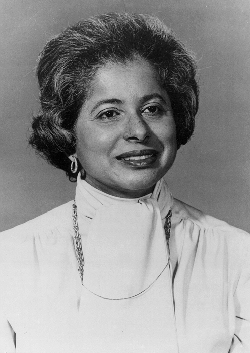
- Patricia Roberts Harris
  First African-American woman Ambassador of the United States: Patricia Roberts Harris, ambassador to Luxembourg
- First African-American NFL official: Burl Toler, field judge/head linesman
- First African American to win a national chess championship: Frank Street Jr. (U.S. Amateur Championship)
- First African-American United States Solicitor General: Thurgood Marshall (See also: 1967)
- First African-American woman to receive a Doctor of Juridical Science degree from Yale Law School: Pauli Murray

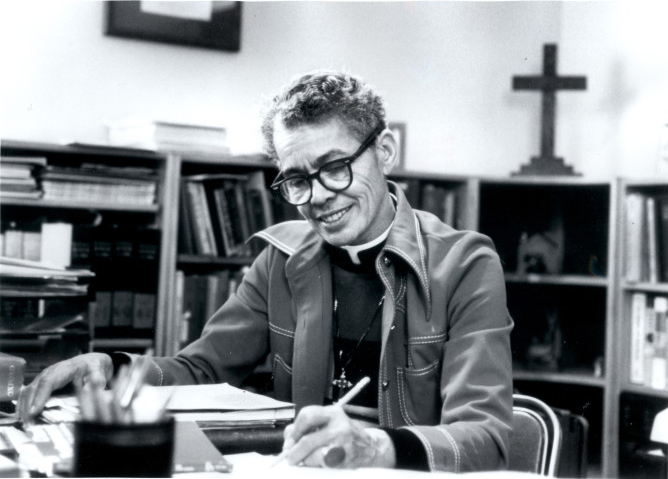
Pauli Murray

- First African American to broadcast from the United Nations: Bea Moten-Foster
- First African-American actress to portray a lead role at the American Shakespeare Festival: Ruby Dee
- First African American inducted into the National Academy of Sciences: David Blackwell
- First director of Health Services for the Head Start (program) was the African-American physician: Gertrude Hunter
- First African-American woman to receive a PhD degree in philosophy (Yale University): Joyce Mitchell Cook
- First African American to win the world billiards championship: Cisero Murphy

1966

- First African-American man to be nominated for a Primetime Emmy Award and first African American to win a Primetime Emmy Award: Bill Cosby, I Spy
- First team with five African-American starters to win the NCAA basketball tournament: 1965–66 Texas Western Miners basketball team
- First African-American coach in the National Basketball Association: Bill Russell (Boston Celtics)
- First African-American (mixed-race) model on the cover of a Vogue (British Vogue) magazine: Donyale Luna
- First post-Reconstruction African-American elected to the U.S. Senate (and first African-American elected to the U.S. Senate by popular vote): Edward Brooke (Republican; Massachusetts) (See also: 1962)
- First African-American Cabinet secretary: Robert C. Weaver (Department of Housing and Urban Development)
- First African-American Major League Baseball umpire: Emmett Ashford
- First African-American NFL broadcaster: Lowell W. Perry (CBS, on Pittsburgh Steelers games) (See also: 1957)
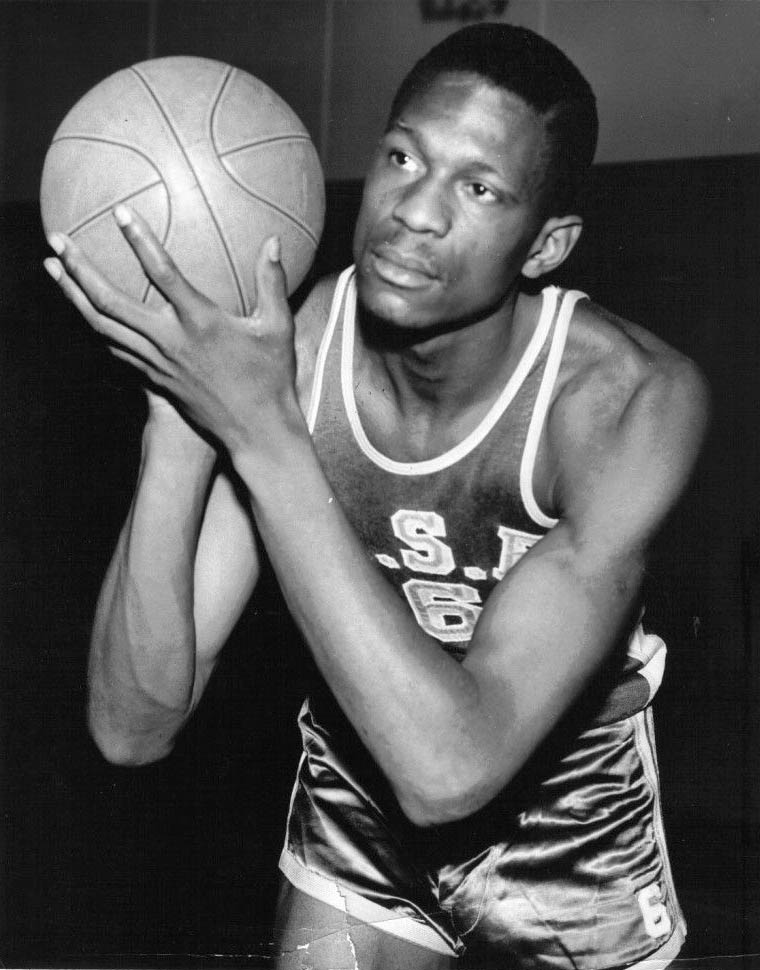
- Bill Russell
  First African-American fire commissioner of a major U.S. city: Robert O. Lowery of the New York City Fire Department
- First African-American mayor in Ohio: Robert C. Henry of Springfield, Ohio.
- First African-American woman to earn a contract with an American national symphony – with the Pittsburgh Symphony Orchestra as principal keyboardist, playing piano, harpsichord, organ and celesta: Patricia Prattis Jennings
- First African American doctor in the U.S. Submarine Service when commissioned and assigned to the USS George C. Marshall: William A. Ross
- First African American appointed as faculty member of the United States Naval Academy (chemistry department): Samuel P. Massie
- First African American U-2 reconnaissance aircraft pilot: James T. Whitehead
- First African-American woman to become a federal judge (United States District Court for the Southern District of New York): Constance Baker Motley
- First African American to graduate from the U.S. Coast Guard Academy: Merle Smith
- First African American United States circuit judge to serve on the United States Court of Appeals for the Sixth Circuit: Wade H. McCree
- First African American United States circuit judge to serve on the United States Court of Appeals for the District of Columbia Circuit: Spottswood W. Robinson III

1967

- First African-American elected mayor of a large U.S. city: Carl B. Stokes (Cleveland, Ohio) (Note: Although Stokes was elected after Richard G. Hatcher of Gary, Indiana, Stokes took office first. Walter Washington was first black mayor of a major city (Washington, DC), but was appointed. Fellow Ohioan Robert C. Henry had been appointed mayor of Springfield, Ohio a year earlier, in 1966. Other African Americans had served as mayors of smaller communities during and after Reconstruction.)
- First African American appointed to the Supreme Court of the United States: Thurgood Marshall (See also: 1965)
- First African American selected for astronaut training: Robert Henry Lawrence Jr.
- First African-American woman, and first woman, to appear on the cover of Rolling Stone magazine: Tina Turner
- First African American to be inducted into the Pro Football Hall of Fame: Emlen Tunnell
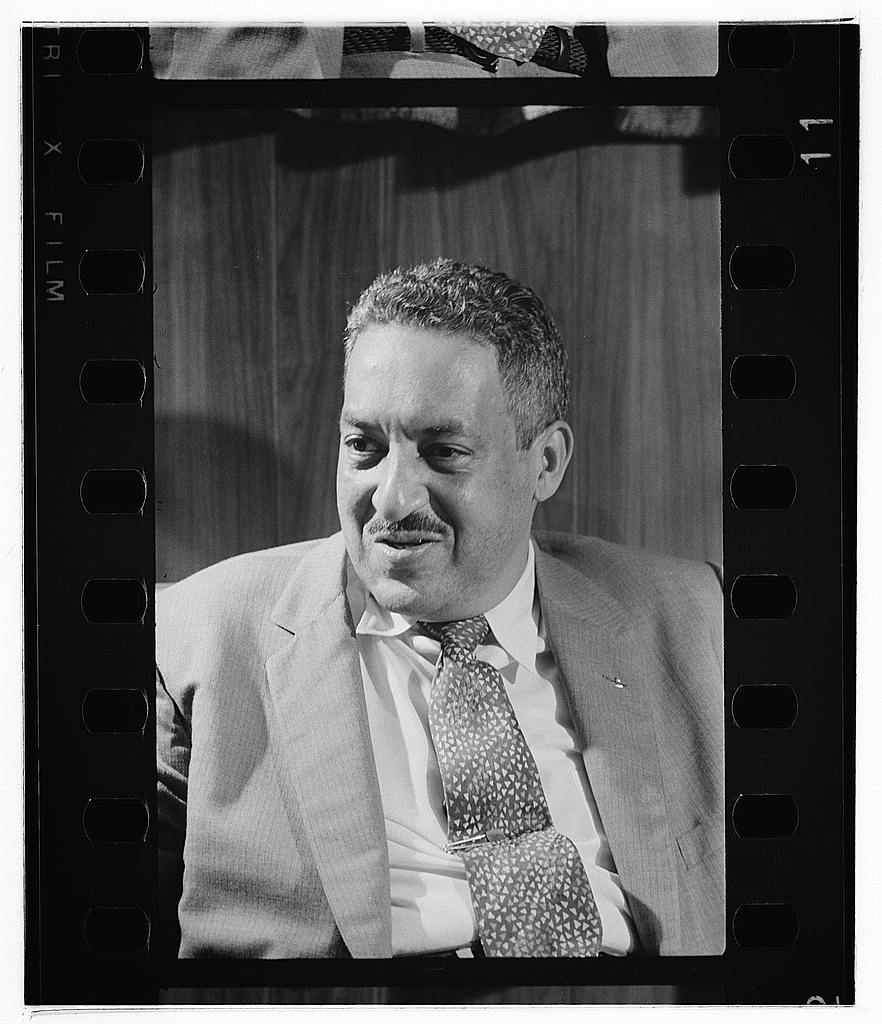
- Thurgood Marshall
  First African-American interracial kiss on network television: entertainers Nancy Sinatra (Italian-American) and Sammy Davis Jr. (African-American) on Sinatra's variety special Movin' With Nancy, airing December 11 on NBC (See also: 1968)
- First tenured African-American professor in the University of Chicago's Biological Sciences Division: James E. Bowman
- Two African Americans became Duke University's first Ph.D. graduates: Ida Stephens Owens and James Roland Law
- First African-American woman to be head of a Catholic hospital: Mary Antona Ebo
- First African-American woman to serve as associate dean of a major medical school (New York Medical College): Jane C. Wright
- First African American to earn a Ph.D. in chemistry from North Carolina State University: Steve B. Latimer
- First African-American mayor of a major American city, and the first mayor in Washington, D.C. since 1871 when President Lyndon Johnson appointed him: Walter Washington
- First African-American officer in the U.S. Marine Corps to lead an infantry company into combat while serving during the Vietnam War: J. Gary Cooper
- First African-American woman to earn a Ph.D. from Louisiana State University: Pinkie Gordon Lane
- First African-American woman and first woman to be awarded the United States Army's Expert Field Medical Badge: Clara Adams-Ender

1968

- First African-American interracial kiss on a network television sci-fi drama: Uhura, played by the late Nichelle Nichols (African American) and Captain Kirk, played by William Shatner (Jewish-Canadian): Star Trek: "Plato's Stepchildren" (See also: 1967)
- First African-American man to win a Grand Slam tennis event: Arthur Ashe (US Open) (See also: Althea Gibson, 1956; Serena Williams, 2003)
- First African-American coach to win an NBA championship: Bill Russell
- First African American to serve as an executive of the United Methodist Publishing House: W. T. Handy Jr.
- First African-American woman elected to U.S. House of Representatives: Shirley Chisholm (New York)
- First African American and first woman appointed as a United States Assistant Secretary of State (Assistant Secretary of State for Consular Affairs): Barbara M. Watson
- First African American to start at quarterback in the modern era of professional football: Marlin Briscoe (Denver Broncos, AFL)
- First African-American commissioned officer awarded the Medal of Honor: Riley L. Pitts
- First fine-arts museum devoted to African-American work: Studio Museum in Harlem
- First African-American actress to star in her own television series where she did not play a domestic worker: Diahann Carroll in Julia (see also: 1963)
- First African-American woman as a presidential candidate: Charlene Mitchell (See also: Shirley Chisholm, 1972)
- First African-American woman reporter for The New York Times: Nancy Hicks Maynard
- First African-American starring character of a comic strip: Danny Raven in Dateline: Danger! by Al McWilliams and John Saunders.
- First African-American woman to win an Olympic 800m title: Madeline Manning
- First African-American woman to work as an epidemiologist at the Food and Drug Administration (FDA): Theresa Greene Reed
- First African-American woman to be promoted to the rank of full colonel in the U.S. Air Force: Ruth A. Lucas
- First African American to chair a department at Harvard Medical School (now called the Department of Microbiology and Molecular Genetics): Harold Amos
- First African American certified in radiologic physics by the American Board of Radiology: Louis B. Levy
- First African-American woman to be certified by the American Board of Surgery (ABS): Hughenna L. Gauntlett
- First African American certified by the American Board of Plastic Surgery: Vincent Porter
- First African American from the southern United States to host a daily prime time talk show: Xernona Clayton
- First African-American woman to serve with the Connecticut State Police (from Durham, Connecticut) (Also first in the United States): Louise Smith
- First African-American woman promoted to the rank of colonel in the U.S. Army: Clotilde Dent Bowen
- First African-American woman elected judge from a popular election in the nation (District Court bench in Guilford County, North Carolina: Elreta Alexander-Ralston
- First woman associate dean of a dental school in the United States (Howard University): Jeanne Sinkford

1969

- First African-American superhero: The Falcon, Marvel Comics' Captain America #117 (September 1969). (See also: Lobo, 1965 and Luke Cage, 1972)
- First African-American graduate of Harvard Business School: Lillian Lincoln
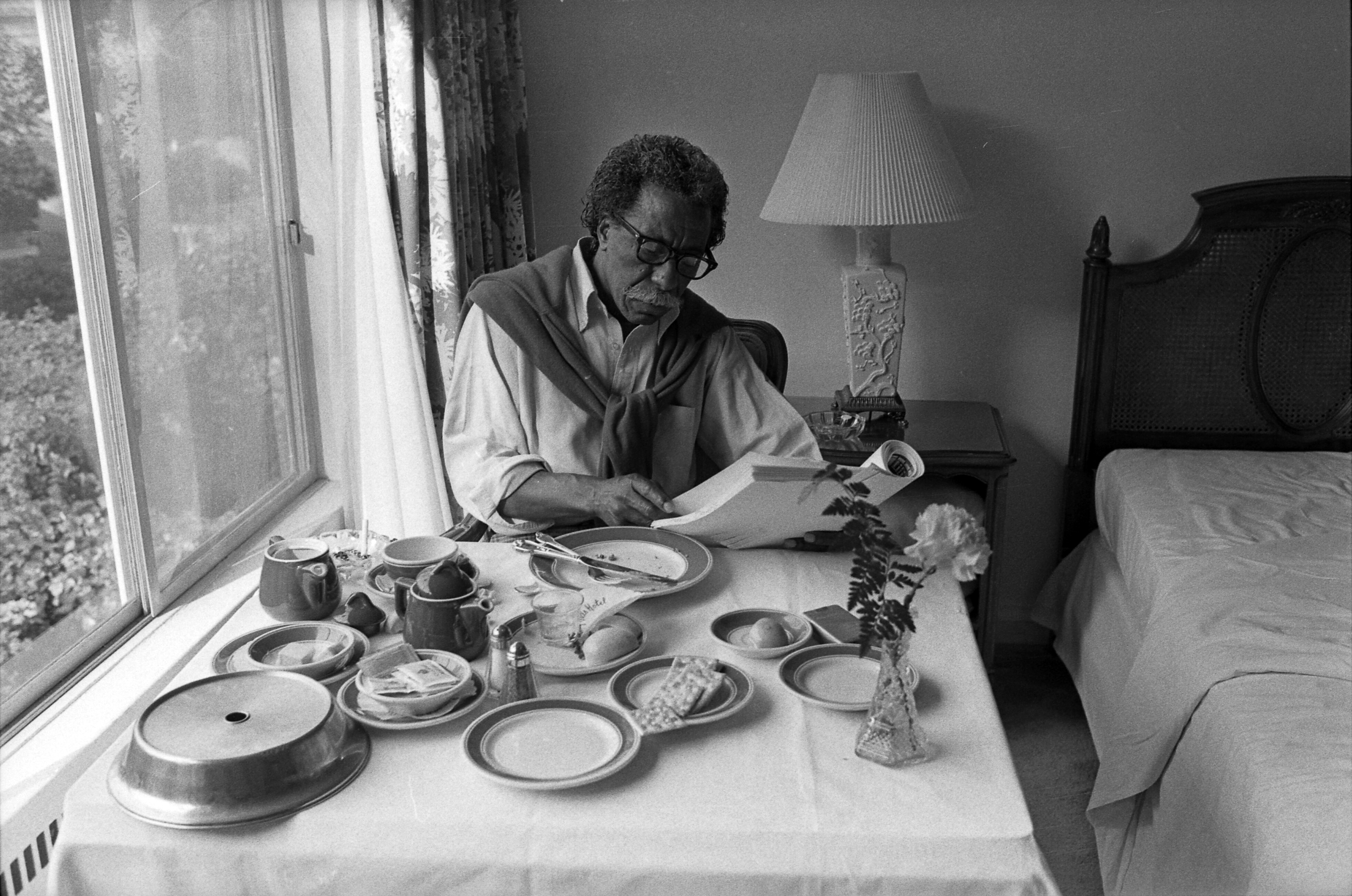
- Gordon Parks
  First African-American director of a major Hollywood motion picture: Gordon Parks (The Learning Tree)
- First African-American founder of a classical training school and the company of ballet: Arthur Mitchell, Dance Theatre of Harlem (See also: 1955)
- First African-American woman to appear on the Grand Ole Opry: Linda Martell
- First African American to own a commercial airliner: Warren Wheeler (Wheeler Airlines)
- First African American to become a member of the San Diego City Council: Leon Williams
- First African American to earn a PhD in computer science: Clarence Ellis
- First African-American man to win the Pulitzer Prize, and the first African American awarded the Pulitzer Prize for Feature Photography: Moneta Sleet Jr.
- First African American United States Postal Service Assistant Postmaster General: Ronald B. Lee
- First African-American woman and first woman Senior Staff Associate of the American Political Science Association: Mae C. King
- First woman to preach at a regular service at St. Paul's cathedral in London: Coretta Scott King
- First African-American director of the United States Department of Labor Women's Bureau: Elizabeth Duncan Koontz

=== 1970s ===
1970

- First African American to head an Episcopal diocese: John Melville Burgess, diocesan bishop of Massachusetts
- Possibly the first African-American U.S. Navy Master Diver: Carl Brashear (See also: 1915 (John Henry Turpin), 1954; 1968)
- First African-American member of the New York Stock Exchange: Joseph L. Searles III
- First African-American NCAA Division I basketball coach: Will Robinson (Illinois State University) (Note: At the time, the NCAA had not yet adopted its three-division system. Illinois State was in the NCAA University Division, which became Division I in 1973. The NCAA retroactively considers University Division members to have been Division I members.)
- First African-American contestant in the Miss America pageant: Cheryl Browne (Miss Iowa)
- First African-American woman (and first woman) to become a physician's assistant: Joyce Nichols
- First African-American actress to win an Emmy Award: Gail Fisher for Mannix (see also: 1971)
- First African-American basketball player to win the NBA All-Star MVP, the NBA Finals MVP, and the NBA MVP all in the same season: Willis Reed (New York Knicks)
- First African American (and first American of any race) to initiate the concept of free agency. He refused to accept a trade following the 1969 season, ultimately appealing his case to the U.S. Supreme Court. The trend of free agency expanded across the entire landscape of professional sports for all races and all cultures: Curt Flood (St. Louis Cardinals) (Note: Although Flood's legal challenge was unsuccessful, it brought about additional solidarity among players as they fought against baseball's reserve clause and sought free agency.)
- First African American to become director of a major library system in America: Clara Stanton Jones, as director of the Detroit Public Library
- First African American to perform at a Super Bowl halftime show: Lionel Hampton (Super Bowl IV)
- First African-American woman to attain the rank of colonel: Margaret E. Bailey
- First African American to win the Pulitzer Prize for Drama (No Place to Be Somebody): Charles Gordone
- First African American to become a member of the American Academy of Dermatology (AAD): John A. Kenney Jr.
- First African American selected to be president of the American Public Health Association: Paul Cornely
- First African-American woman to work as an administrator at the American Medical Association: Effie O'Neal Ellis
- First African-American woman to be a high fashion model and the first to appear in a television commercial: Naomi Sims
- First African American to have a weekly prime-time television show under his own name (The Flip Wilson Show): Flip Wilson
- First person (naval engineer) credited with creating a computer-generated rough draft of a U.S. naval ship: Raye Montague
- First African-American woman commentator to appear on a national network as a radio and television commentator: Ethel L. Payne
- First African-American president of the American Psychological Association: Kenneth Clark
- First African-American president of any major predominately-white university in the United States (Michigan State University): Clifton R. Wharton Jr.
- First African-American woman to guest host The Tonight Show (aired on 29 May 1970): Della Reese

1971

- First African-American pitcher to be inducted into the Baseball Hall of Fame: Satchel Paige (See also: Jackie Robinson, 1962)
- First African-American president of the New York City Board of Education: Isaiah Edward Robinson Jr.
- First African-American woman to win a Golden Globe Award: Gail Fisher for Mannix (see also: 1970)
- First African-American female jockey in the United States: Cheryl White
- First African American to appear by herself on the cover of Playboy: Darine Stern (October issue)
- First African American to become president of the Public Library Association: Effie Lee Morris*1971 DAV Scholarship First African American to receive scholarship to Art Institute of Chicago Mary J. Weatherspoon[tribute 20 years Disable American Veterans Association]
- First African-American president of the American Psychological Association (APA): Kenneth B. Clark
- First African American governor of the American Board of Internal Medicine: W. Lester Henry Jr.
- First African-American physician to be certified in colorectal surgery: Bobby J. Harris
- First African American to become a board member of the American Academy of Dermatology (AAD): John A. Kenney Jr.
- First African-American to become a member of the Radio-Television News Directors Association: Malvin Russell Goode
- First African-American woman to head a major teaching hospital in the United States (executive director of Sydenham Hospital in New York City: Florence S. Gaynor
- First African-American to play a Bond Girl (Thumper in Diamonds are Forever): Trina Parks
- First woman and first African-American woman program manager of ships in the United States Navy: Raye Montague
- First African-American woman and first woman in the U.S. Air Force to become an aircraft maintenance officer: Marcelite J. Harris
- First African American vice president at a Big Ten university: Philip G. Hubbard

1972

- First African American to campaign for the U.S. presidency in a major political party: Shirley Chisholm (Democratic Party) (See also: 1968)
- First African-American superhero to star in own comic-book series: Luke Cage, Marvel Comics' Luke Cage, Hero for Hire #1 (June 1972). (See also: Lobo, 1965, and the Falcon, 1969)
- First African-American National Basketball Association (NBA) general manager (Milwaukee Bucks): Wayne Embry
- First African-American interracial romantic kiss in a mainstream comics magazine: "The Men Who Called Him Monster", by writer Don McGregor (See also: 1975) and artist Luis Garcia, in Warren Publishing's black-and-white horror-comics magazine Creepy #43 (Jan. 1972) (See also: 1975)
- First African-American interracial male kiss on network television: Sammy Davis Jr. (mixed-race) and Carroll O'Connor (Caucasian) in All in the Family
- First African American inducted into the Basketball Hall of Fame: Team-owner and coach Bob Douglas, in the category of "contributor" (See also: New York Renaissance, 1963; player Bill Russell, 1975; coach Clarence Gaines, 1982)
- First African-American female Broadway director: Vinnette Justine Carroll (Don't Bother Me, I Can't Cope)
- First African-American comic-book creator to receive a "created by" cover-credit: Wayne Howard (Midnight Tales #1)
- First Black valedictorian of the National Cathedral School: Fath Davis Ruffins
- First African American to be awarded the Academy Award for Best Original Song for the "Theme from Shaft" and third African American to be awarded an Oscar in any category: Isaac Hayes
- First African-American woman to earn a PhD in physics (University of Michigan): Willie Hobbs Moore
- First blind African-American psychiatrist in the United States: Edwin Nii Adom
- First U.S. naval ship, the USS Jesse L. Brown, that was named for an African-American officer who was the first African American naval officer killed in action during the Korean War was launched: Jesse L. Brown
- First African American principal player in a major American orchestra (timpanist for the San Francisco Symphony): Elayne Jones
- First African-American member of the Federal Communications Commission (FCC): Benjamin Hooks
- First African-American woman to earn a PhD in chemical engineering (University of Iowa): Lilia A. Abron
- First African-American woman to be elected mayor of a United States municipality: Ellen Walker Craig-Jones
- First African-American woman to serve as a television correspondent for CBS News: Michele Clark

1973

- First African-American artistic director of a professional regional theater: Harold Scott (Cincinnati Playhouse in the Park)
- First African-American Bond villain in a James Bond movie: Yaphet Kotto, playing Mr. Big/Dr. Kananga, Live and Let Die
- First African-American woman to become romantically involved with James Bond: Gloria Hendry (playing Rosie Carver), Live and Let Die
- First African-American elected mayor of Los Angeles: Tom Bradley
- First African-American psychologist in the U.S. Air Force: John D. Robinson
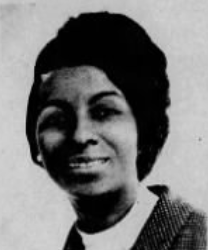
- Doris A. Davis
  First African-American woman mayor of a U.S. metropolitan city of more than 50,000 residents: Doris A. Davis, Compton, California
- First African-American woman adult film star, Desiree West.
- First African-American woman to earn a doctorate degree from MIT: Shirley Ann Jackson
- First African American to join the American Chemical Society: Dorothy J. Phillips
- First African-American chemist inducted into the National Academy of Sciences: Percy Lavon Julian
- First African American member of the National Task Force on Organ Procurement and Transplantation: Clive Orville Callender
- First U.S. destroyer, USS Miller (FF-1091), named after an African-American: Doris Miller (honored for his naval service and particularly his courage and actions during the Pearl Harbor attack)
- First African-American woman to earn a Ph.D. in biophysics: Anna Coble, from the University of Illinois at Urbana–Champaign
- First African-American woman to serve as probate judge in the United States: Edith Jacqueline Ingram Grant
- First African-American woman to be named director of the Biological Photographers Association: Luvenia C. Miller

1974

- First African-American model on the cover of U.S. Vogue magazine: Beverly Johnson
- First African-American NBA Coach of the Year: Ray Scott (Detroit Pistons)
- First African-American woman to serve as a United States Secret Service agent: Zandra Flemister
- First African American to become a board member of the Society for Investigative Dermatology: John A. Kenney Jr.
- First African American pilot selected to join the U.S. Air Force Thunderbirds: Lloyd W. Newton
- First African-American woman and first woman military judge in the history of the Marine Corps Reserve: Sara J. Harper
- First African American to serve on the United States District Court for the Southern District of Ohio: Robert Morton Duncan
- First African American to serve on the United States District Court for the Eastern District of New York: Henry Bramwell
- First African-American woman crowned homecoming queen in a predominately white college or university in the South (Arkansas State University): Marilyn Broadway
- First African-American woman to become a U.S. Navy flight trainee: Jill E. Brown
- First woman editor of the Journal of Negro History: Lorraine A. Williams

1975

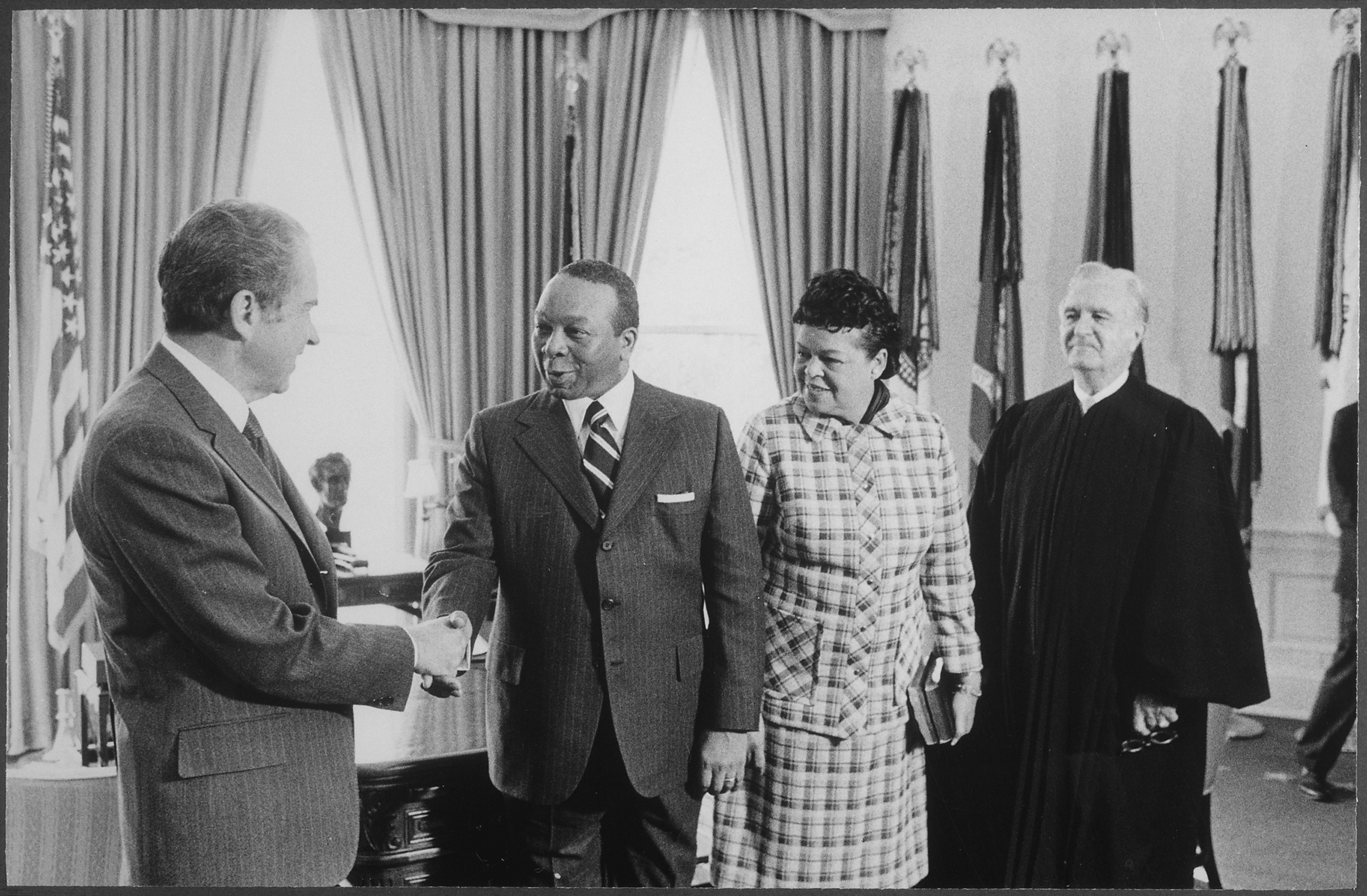
- Walter Washington
  First African-American elected mayor, and first mayor, of Washington, D.C.: Walter Washington
- First African-American game show host: Adam Wade (CBS's Musical Chairs)
- First African-American four-star general: Daniel James Jr.
- First African-American inducted into the Basketball Hall of Fame as a player: Bill Russell (See also: New York Renaissance, 1963; Bob Douglas, 1972; Clarence Gaines, 1982)
- First African-American interracial couple in a TV-show cast: The Jeffersons, actors Franklin Cover (Caucasian) and Roxie Roker (African American) as Tom and Helen Willis, respectively; the show's now-deceased creator: Norman Lear
- First African-American interracial romantic kiss in a full-color comic book: Amazing Adventures #31 (July 1975), feature "Killraven: Warrior of the Worlds", characters M'Shulla Scott and Carmilla Frost, by writer Don McGregor and artist P. Craig Russell (See also: 1972)
- First African-American manager in Major League Baseball: Frank Robinson (Cleveland Indians)
- First African-American model on the cover of Elle magazine: Beverly Johnson
- First African-American psychologist in the U.S. Navy: John D. Robinson
- First African American to play in a men's major golf championship: Lee Elder (The Masters)
- First African American to be named Super Bowl MVP in NFL: Franco Harris (Pittsburgh Steelers). Of mixed ancestry, Harris was also the first Italian American to win the award.
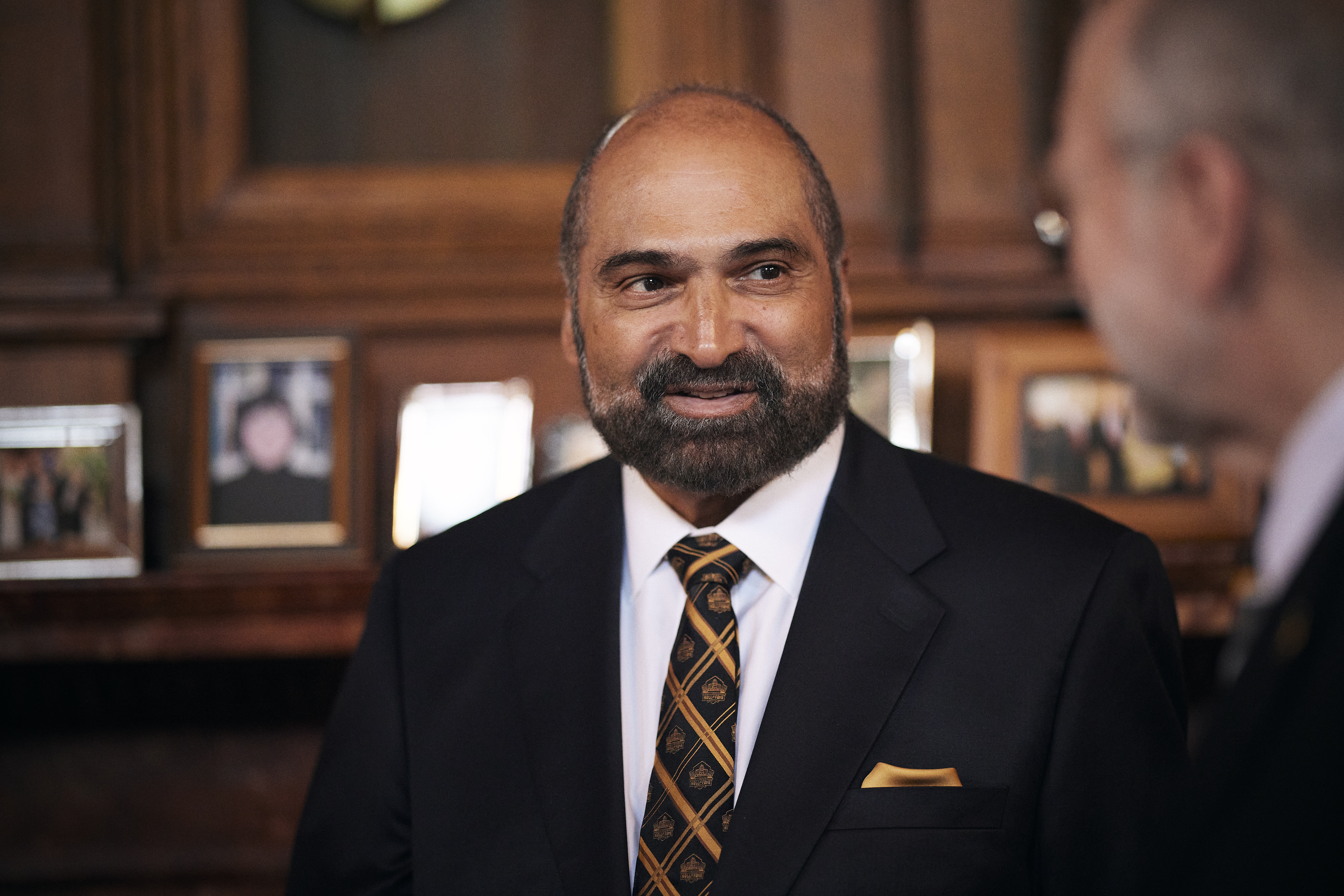
- Franco Harris
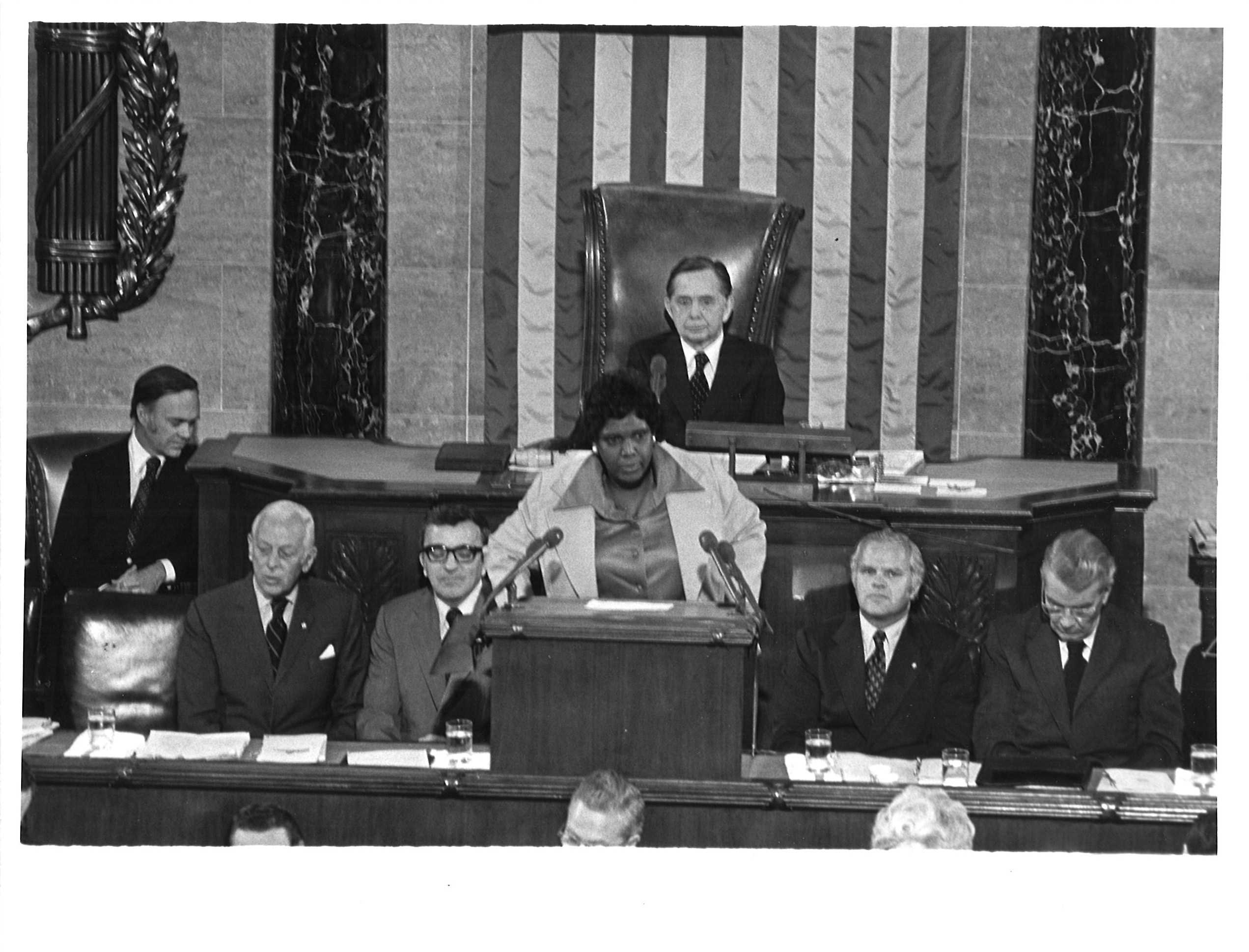
  Barbara Jordan
  First African-American women named as Time magazine's Person of the Year: Barbara Jordan and Addie L. Wyatt
- First African-American woman to anchor a major United States network newscast: Carole Simpson
- First African-American woman to be appointed to the District of Columbia Court of Appeals, which is the court of last resort for the District of Columbia, and first to serve on any court of last resort in the United States: Julia Cooper Mack
- First African American to serve as United States Secretary of Transportation and the second African American to serve in the United States Cabinet: William Thaddeus Coleman Jr.
- First partial artificial heart (left ventricular assist device or LVAD) implantation in a human was completed by an African-American cardiac surgeon: John C. Norman
- First African American to be certified in pediatric surgery: Samuel Blanton Rosser
- First African American to serve on the House Committee on Ways and Means: Charles Rangel
- First African American to play in the Masters Tournament: Lee Elder
- First African-American president of the Girl Scouts of the USA: Gloria Randle Scott
- First woman and first African-American woman dean of a dental school (Howard University): Jeanne Sinkford
- First African-American woman chair of the NAACP National Board of Directors: Margaret Bush Wilson
- First woman and first African American woman to earn tenure at MIT Sloan School of Management: Phyllis Ann Wallace

1976

- First African-American female elected officer of an international labor union: Addie L. Wyatt
- First African American to become president of the American Library Association: Clara Stanton Jones, who served as its acting president from April 11 to July 22, 1976, and then its president from July 22, 1976, to 1977
- First African American to win a major party nomination for statewide office in the Southern United States since the Reconstruction era: Asa T. Spaulding Jr.
- First African-American lawyer from the Deep South to be appointed to the federal judiciary – the United States Military Court of Appeals (now the United States Court of Appeals for the Armed Forces) in Washington, D.C.: Matthew J. Perry
- First African-American artist to win Best New Artist at the Grammy Awards: Natalie Cole
- First African-American woman to deliver the keynote address at a Democratic National Convention: Barbara Jordan
- First woman to graduate from the United States Army Command and General Staff College with a degree in military arts and sciences: Clara Adams-Ender
- First African-American to serve as Consultant in Poetry to the Library of Congress, a role today known as U.S. Poet Laureate: Robert Hayden
- First African-American woman inducted into the American Academy of Arts and Letters: Gwendolyn Brooks
- First African-American woman lawyer to serve in the U.S. Coast Guard: Cheryl Avery
- First African-American woman assessor in the nation: Cassandra Elaine Smith-Gray
- First African-American woman president of the American College Personnel Association: Anne Pruitt-Logan
- First woman and first African-American woman to chair the Congressional Black Caucus: Yvonne Brathwaite Burke
- First African American brigade commander of the United States Naval Academy: Mason C. Reddix, Jr.
- First African-American woman to become a Special Agent for the Federal Bureau of Investigation (FBI): Sylvia Mathis

1977

- First African-American (and first woman), appointed director of the Peace Corps: Carolyn R. Payton
- First African American drafted to play professional basketball, first woman to dunk in a professional women's game: Cardte Hicks
- First African-American woman in the U.S. Cabinet: Patricia Roberts Harris, Secretary of Housing and Urban Development
- First African-American woman to have her signature appear on U.S. currency: Azie Taylor Morton, the 36th Treasurer of the United States
- First African-American publisher of mainstream gay publication: Alan Bell (Gaysweek)
- First African-American woman to join the Daughters of the American Revolution: Karen Batchelor
- First African-American Major League Baseball general manager: Bill Lucas (Atlanta Braves)
- First African-American woman to be ordained as an Episcopal priest: Pauli Murray.
- First African-American (half-Latin) woman to work as a registrar for a major scientific museum: Margaret Santiago.
- First African American and the third woman to be appointed Assistant Secretary for Administration of the United States Department of Agriculture: Joan Scott Wallace
- First African American elected president of the American Chemical Society (ACS): Henry Aaron Hill
- First African American appointed director of the National Earthquake Information Center: Waverly Person
- First African-American woman to be appointed president of American Women in Radio and Television: Phoebe Beasley
- First African-American woman invited to train with the Metropolitan Police (Scotland Yard) Forensic Science Laboratory (at the age of 55) as a handwriting expert and went on to make a career as a forgery expert: Bessie Blount Griffin
- First African-American woman to become a thoracic surgeon: Rosalyn Scott
- First woman and first African-American woman to serve on the Board of Directors of the Nashville Branch of the Federal Reserve Bank of Atlanta, and she served two terms as its chair: Cecelia Adkins

1978

- First African-American broadcast network news anchor: Max Robinson
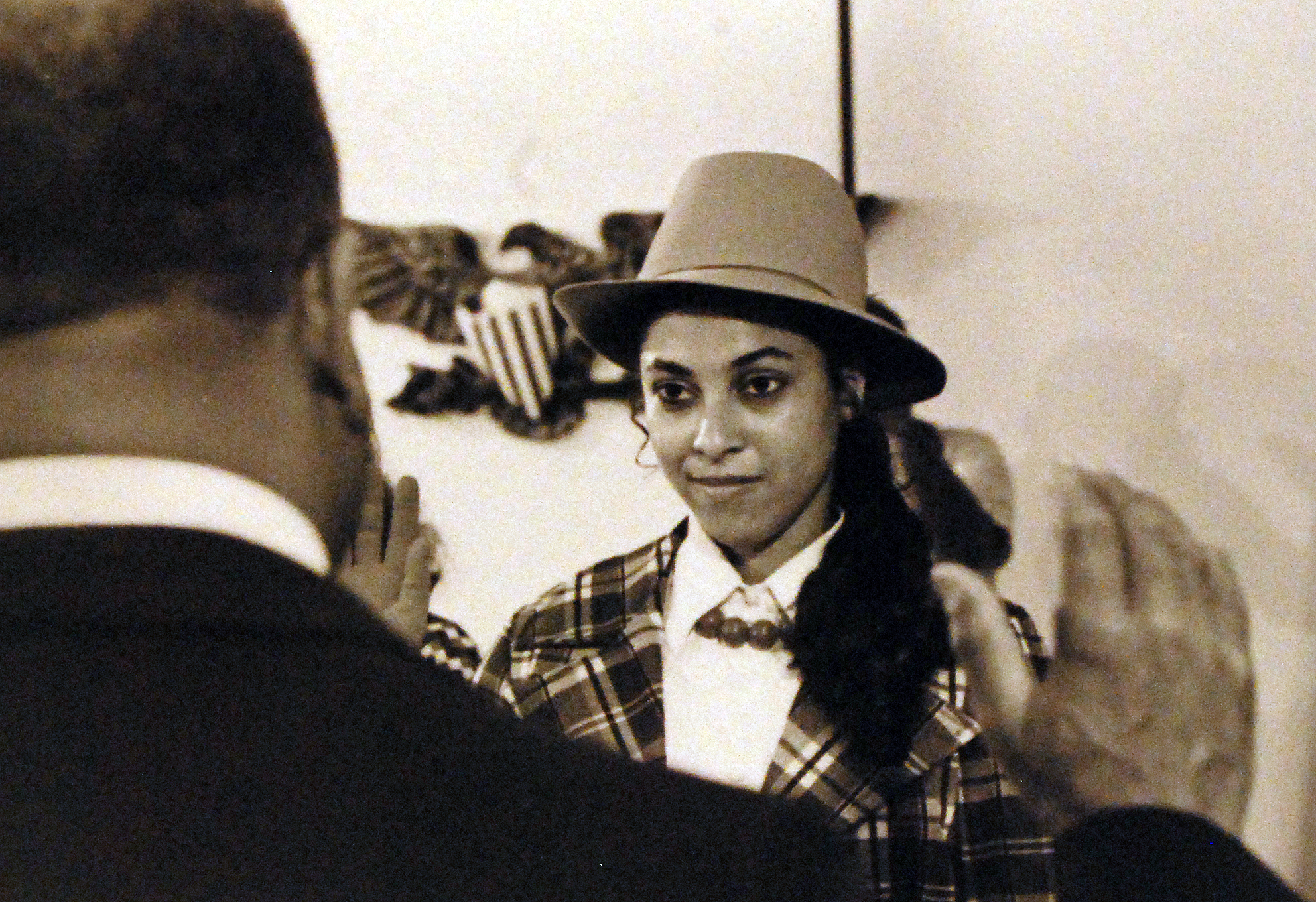
- Jill E. Brown
  First African-American woman pilot for a major commercial airline: Jill E. Brown, Texas International Airlines
- First African-American woman to advance to the rank of captain in the Navy: Joan C. Bynum
- First African American president of the Special Libraries Association (SLA): Vivian Davidson Hewitt
- First African American to win the Pulitzer Prize for Fiction (Elbow Room): James Alan McPherson
- First African American otolaryngologist: James Herman Mabrie III
- First African-American physician elected president of the Society of Surgical Oncology: LaSalle D. Leffall Jr.
- First African American and first woman to be named Democratic whip-at-large in the United States House of Representatives: Cardiss Collins
- First African-American woman and first woman to serve as president of the American Lung Association: Ethelene Crockett
- First African-American woman president of the Planned Parenthood Federation of America: Faye Wattleton
- First African American United States circuit judge to serve on the United States Court of Appeals for the Eighth Circuit: Theodore McMillian
- First African American to serve on the United States District Court for the Western District of Pennsylvania: Paul Allen Simmons
- First African American to serve on the United States District Court for the Eastern District of Louisiana: Robert Frederick Collins
- First African American to serve on the United States District Court for the Eastern District of Washington and the United States District Court for the Western District of Washington: Jack Edward Tanner
- First person and first African American in the state of Arkansas to become board certified in pediatric endocrinology: Joycelyn Elders
- First African-American woman to anchor a network TV sports show (The NFL Today on CBS): Jayne Kennedy

1979

- First African-American U.S. Marine Corps general officer upon his promotion to Brigadier General: Frank E. Petersen
- First African American to win a Daytime Emmy Award for lead actor in a soap opera: Al Freeman Jr. (Ed Hall in One Life to Live)
- First African-American woman ordained in the Lutheran Church in America (LCA), the largest of three denominations that later combined to form the Evangelical Lutheran Church in America: Earlean Miller
- First African-American head coach of an NCAA Division I-A football program: Willie Jeffries (Wichita State).
- First African American to play professional basketball behind the "Iron Curtain", Kent Washington played for KS Start Lublin, Poland.

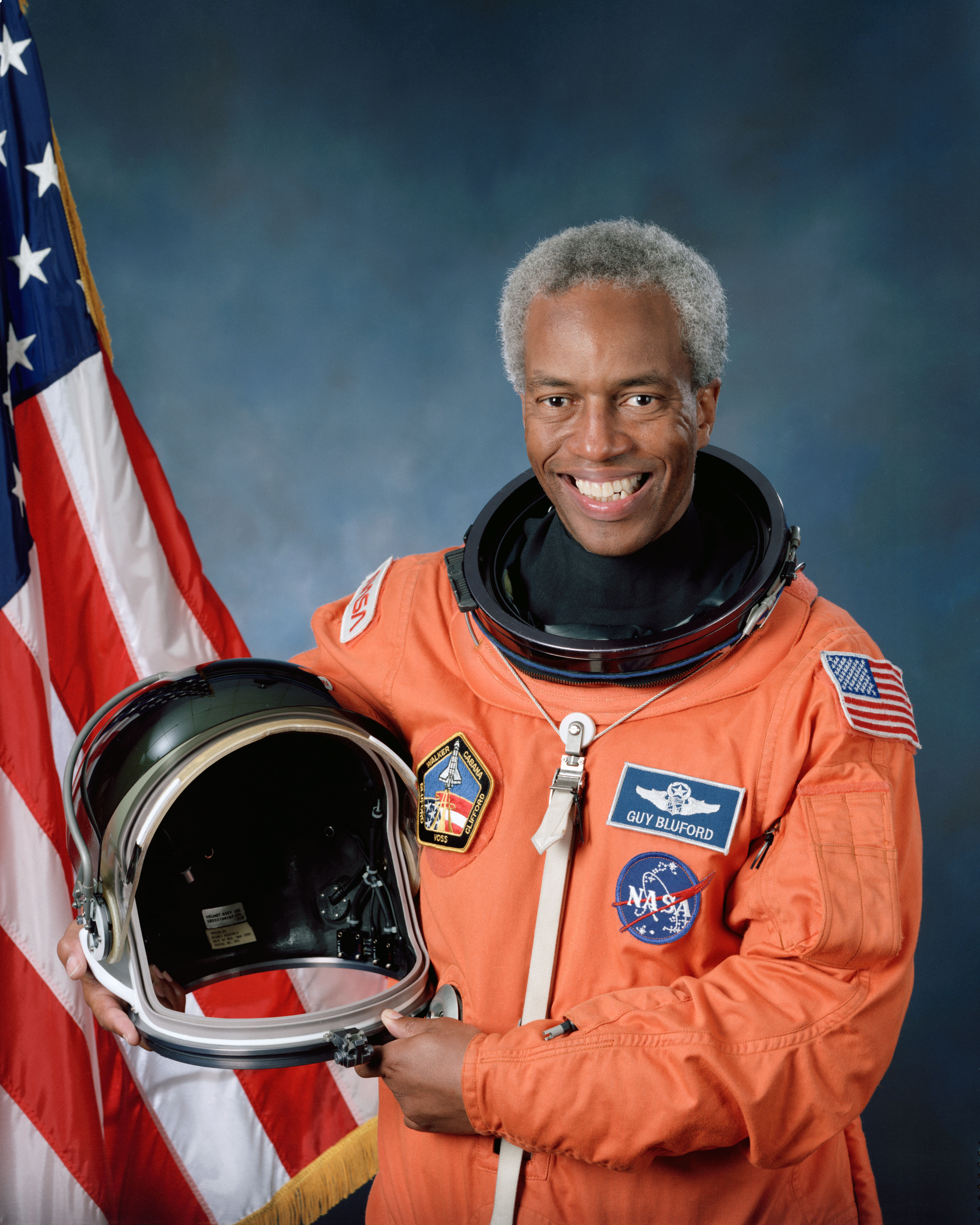
Guion Bluford

- First African American to serve as the United States Secretary of Health and Human Services: Patricia Roberts Harris (Note: Harris was Secretary on May 4, 1980, when the office changed names from Secretary of Health, Education, and Welfare to Secretary of Health and Human Services. Because the department merely changed names, she did not need to be confirmed again, and her term continued uninterrupted)
- First African-American woman to earn a Ph.D. in chemical engineering: Jennie Patrick, from the Massachusetts Institute of Technology
- First African-American woman promoted to brigadier general in the U.S. Army and the first African-American chief of the U.S. Army Nurse Corps: Hazel Johnson-Brown
- First woman and first African-American woman judge for the United States Court of Appeals for the Second Circuit and first woman and first African-American woman elected to a fellowship in the American College of Trial Lawyers: Amalya Kearse
- First African American United States circuit judge to serve on the United States Court of Appeals for the Fifth Circuit: Joseph W. Hatchett
- First African American United States circuit judge to serve on the United States Court of Appeals for the Ninth Circuit: Jerome Farris
- First African-American woman to serve on the United States District Court for the Eastern District of Michigan: Anna Diggs Taylor
- First African American and the first African-American woman to serve on the United States District Court for the District of New Jersey: Anne Elise Thompson
- First African American to serve on the United States District Court for the Northern District of Georgia: Horace Ward
- First African-American woman appointed as a United States magistrate judge (served on the United States District Court for the District of Massachusetts): Joyce London Alexander
- First woman and first African-American woman Corporation Counsel for the District of Columbia: Judith W. Rogers
- First African American designated First Captain at West Point: Vincent K. Brooks

=== 1980s ===
1980

- First African-American woman to graduate from (and to attend) the U.S. Naval Academy: Janie L. Mines, graduated in 1980
- First African-American woman to graduate from the U.S. Military Academy at West Point: Priscilla Walker Locke
- First African-American woman to join the cast of NBC's Saturday Night Live: Yvonne Hudson
- First African-American-oriented cable television network: BET (now owned by Paramount Skydance)
- First woman to be elected to the Fellow of the American Institute of Architects (FAIA): Norma Merrick Sklarek
- First African-American appointed as judge to the United States District Court for the Northern District of Alabama, located in Birmingham, Alabama: U. W. Clemon
- First African-American director of the National Science Foundation (NSF): John Brooks Slaughter
- First African-American woman on the Board of Governors of the Mathematical Association of America: Gloria Ford Gilmer
- First African American promoted to the rank of brigadier general of the United States Army Medical Corps: Guthrie Turner
- First African-American physician elected as chancellor of the American College of Radiology: Leslie L. Alexander
- First surgeon to implant the automatic implantable defibrillator in a human: Levi Watkins
- First African American to serve on the United States District Court for the Western District of Tennessee since the Reconstruction era: Odell Horton
- First African American to serve on the United States District Court for the Eastern District of Missouri: Clyde S. Cahill Jr.
- First African American to serve on the United States District Court for the Northern District of Ohio: George Washington White
- First African-American woman to serve as judge of the United States District Court for the District of Columbia: Norma Holloway Johnson
- First African American judge of the United States District Court for the Middle District of Alabama: Myron H. Thompson
- First African American judge on the U.S. District Court for the Eastern District of Arkansas and the U.S. District Court for the Western District of Arkansas: George Howard Jr.

1981

- First African American to play in the NHL: Val James (Buffalo Sabres)
- First African-American woman Curator of the National Museum of American History: Fath Davis Ruffins
- First African-American woman to become board-certified in maternal-fetal medicine (MFM). Yvonne Thornton
- First African-American woman to earn a PhD in astronomy (University of Maryland, College Park, 1981): Barbara A. Williams
- First African American United States circuit judge to serve on the United States Court of Appeals for the Eleventh Circuit: Joseph W. Hatchett
- First African-American woman pilot to serve in the United States Air Force (USAF): Theresa Claiborne
- First woman and first African-American woman president of the National Bar Association: Arnette Hubbard

1982

- First African-American inducted into the Basketball Hall of Fame as a coach: Clarence Gaines (See also: New York Renaissance, 1963; Bob Douglas, 1972; Bill Russell, 1975)
- First African-American U.S. Army four-star General: Roscoe Robinson Jr.
- First African American elected to the San Diego County Board of Supervisors: Leon Williams
- First African-American woman editor of the Harvard Law Review: Annette Gordon-Reed
- First African-American Nurse Corps officer in the Army to graduate from the U.S. Army War College: Clara Adams-Ender
- First African American and first woman to complete a neurosurgery residency at Case Western University, and the second African-American woman certified by the American Board of Neurological Surgery: M. Deborrah Hyde
- First African American to win an Academy Award for Best Supporting Actor: Louis Gossett Jr.
- First African-American woman to earn a Ph.D. in computer science: Marsha Rhea Williams
- First African-American governor of the American College of Surgeons, the first African-American president of the Association of Children's Prosthetic and Orthotic Clinics, and the first African-American member of the AMA House of Delegates representing the American Academy of Orthopaedic Surgeons: Charles H. Epps Jr.
- First board-certified African-American woman orthopaedic surgeon in the United States: Claudia L. Thomas
- First African-American anchor on a major network (NBC Today show): Bryant Gumbel
- First African-American woman oral and maxillofacial surgeon in the United States: Gladys L. Johnson
- First African American woman deputy district attorney in Alabama: Carole Smitherman (Jefferson County)

1983

- First African-American astronaut: Guion Bluford (Challenger mission STS-8). (Note: Cosmonaut Arnaldo Mendez was the first person of African descent in space, in 1980.)
- First African-American mayor of Chicago: Harold Washington
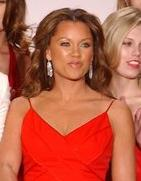
- Vanessa L. Williams
  First African-American (mixed-race) Miss America: Vanessa L. Williams (A few weeks before the end of her reign as Miss America, Williams learned that Penthouse magazine would be publishing unauthorized nude photographs of her in an upcoming issue. Amid growing media controversy and scrutiny, Williams resigned as Miss America in July 1984 (under pressure from the Miss America Organization) and was replaced by first runner-up Miss New Jersey Suzette Charles, who was also African American.)
- First African-American owners of a major metropolitan newspaper: Robert C. and Nancy Hicks Maynard (Oakland Tribune)
- First African American admitted on the national level as a member-at-large of the Daughters of the American Revolution: Lena Santos Ferguson
- First African-American artist to have a music video shown in heavy rotation on MTV: Michael Jackson
- First African American to be elected president of the National Association of Women Lawyers: Mahala Ashley Dickerson
- First African-American physician member of the governing body of the American Board of Pediatrics: Melvin Earl Jenkins
- First African American to command a U.S. submarine when assigned as the Commanding Officer of the USS Houston (SSN-713): C. A. Tzomes
- First African-American actress to replace a white actress on Broadway in a leading role (replaced the vacationing Elizabeth Ashley in Agnes of God): Diahann Carroll
- First African-American women to graduate from the U.S. Coast Guard Academy: Angela Dennis and Daphne Reese
- First African-American woman to lead a major transit agency (General Manager of the Washington Metropolitan Area Transit Authority (WMATA)): Carmen E. Turner
- First African-American woman to earn a Ph.D. in epidemiology in the United States: Lucile Adams-Campbell
- First African-American woman and first woman to chair an ophthalmology residency program in the United States (David Geffen School of Medicine at UCLA): Patricia Bath
- First woman and first African-American woman to head a major life insurance organization in the United States; and the first woman and first African-American woman president of the National Insurance Association: Patricia Walker-Shaw
- African-American woman co-writer and co-producer of the 1983 musical Mama, I Want to Sing!, the longest running Black off-Broadway musical in American history: Vy Higginsen

1984

- First African American to win a delegate-awarding U.S. presidential primary/caucus: Jesse Jackson (Louisiana, the District of Columbia, South Carolina, Virginia, and one of two separate Mississippi contests).
- First African-American New York City Police Commissioner: Benjamin Ward
- First African-American coach to win the NCAA Division I Men's Basketball Championship: John Thompson (Georgetown)
- First African-American woman certified by the American Board of Neurological Surgery: Alexa Canady
- First African-American woman elevated to the position of bishop within the United Methodist Church: Leontine T. Kelly
- First African-American player for the United States men's national soccer team: Eddie Hawkins (Note: Other black players appeared for the USMNT before Hawkins but Hawkins was the first American-born black player. His predecessors were all born abroad and some, such as Joe Gaetjens, were not U.S. citizens.)
- First African-American woman to win gold in the 100-meter hurdles event (1984 Summer Olympics): Benita Fitzgerald-Brown

1985

- First African American to become a member of the U.S. Navy's Blue Angels precision flying team: Donnie Cochran. Also, first African American to command the team (1994).
- First African-American woman general in the U.S. Army: Sherian Cadoria
- First African-American woman to win an MTV Video Music Award: Tina Turner
- First African-American winner of the Academy Award for Best Original Song Score (Purple Rain): Prince
- First African American selected president of the American Orthopedic Association: Charles H. Epps Jr.
- First woman president of the National Medical Association (NMA): Edith Irby Jones
- First woman to serve as the Democratic National Committee Treasurer: Sharon Pratt Dixon
- First woman president of the National Association for the Advancement of Colored People (NAACP): Enolia McMillan
- First African-American woman judge on the United States District Court for the Northern District of Illinois: Ann Claire Williams
- First woman and first African-American woman to become a member of the Harlem Globetrotters: Lynette Woodard

1986

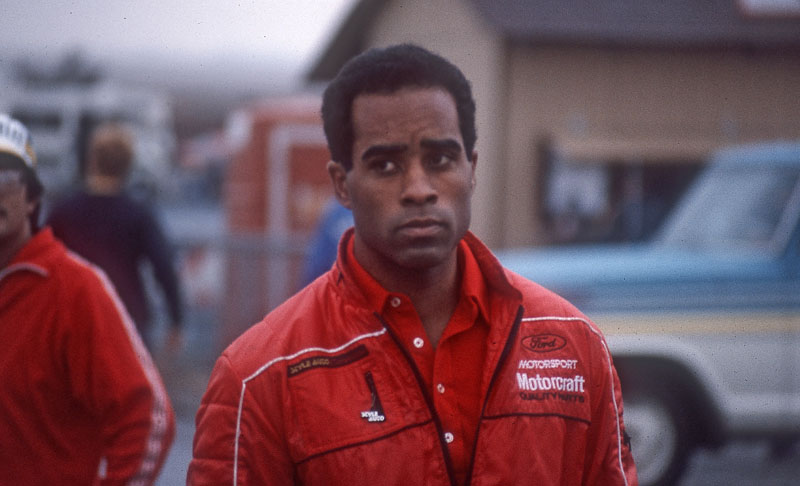
- Willy T. Ribbs
  First African-American Formula One racecar driver: Willy T. Ribbs (Note: Lewis Hamilton became the first black Formula One racer in 2006, but he is a British citizen of Grenadan ancestry, and not an African-American. Ribbs did not compete in a race, but drove a Formula One car professionally in January 1986 as a tester for the Brabham–BMW at Estoril, Portugal.) (See also: Ribbs, 1991)
- First African-American musicians inducted into the Rock and Roll Hall of Fame, in the inaugural class: Chuck Berry, James Brown, Ray Charles, Sam Cooke, Fats Domino, and Little Richard
- First African-American woman to be regularly featured in heavy rotation on MTV with multiple videos: Whitney Houston
- First African-American woman certified by the American Board of Thoracic Surgery: Rosalyn Sterling
- First director and first African-American director for the Office of Minority Health: Herbert W. Nickens
- First African American and first African-American woman appointed Magistrate Judge of the United States District Court for the Eastern District of Missouri: Carol E. Jackson

1987

- First African-American woman, and first woman of any race, inducted into the Rock and Roll Hall of Fame: Aretha Franklin
- First African-American Radio City Music Hall Rockette: Jennifer Jones
- First African-American man to sail around the world solo: Teddy Seymour
- First African-American CEO of a Fortune 500 company: Clifton R. Wharton Jr.
- First African-American woman, and first woman of any race, to have an album debut at number one on the Billboard 200: Whitney Houston
- First African-American woman president of Spelman College: Johnnetta Cole
- First African-American winner of the Academy Award for Best Original Score: Herbie Hancock
- First African-American woman promoted to the rank of major general in the US National Guard: Irene Trowell-Harris
- First Black woman writer to hold a named chair at an Ivy League university (Robert F. Goheen Professor in the Council of Humanities at Princeton University): Toni Morrison
- First woman and first African-American woman president of Lincoln University (Pennsylvania): Niara Sudarkasa

1988

- First African-American woman, and first woman of any race, to set a Guinness World Record for the then-largest paying audience for a concert (180,000 fans): Tina Turner
- First African American to win a medal at the Winter Olympics (a bronze in figure skating): Debi Thomas
- First African-American woman elected to a U.S. judgeship, and first appointed to a state supreme court: Juanita Kidd Stout
- First African-American candidate for President of the United States to obtain ballot access in all 50 states: Lenora Fulani
- First African-American NFL referee: Johnny Grier
- First African-American quarterback to start (and to win) a Super Bowl: Doug Williams (Super Bowl XXII)
- First African-American Olympic gold medalist in wrestling: Kenny Monday
- First African-American man to manage a financial institution: Richard Parsons
- First African American to participate in the International Culinary Olympics in Frankfurt, Germany: Darryl Evans
- First African-American woman to earn a Doctor of Sacred Theology (Catholic University of Louvain Belgium): Diana L. Hayes
- First African-American woman judge for the U.S. bankruptcy court: Bernice B. Donald
- First African-American woman and first woman consecrated to the episcopate in any one of the three branches of Christianity: Barbara Harris
- First African American and first woman president of the Industrial Relations Research Association: Phyllis Ann Wallace

1989

- First African-American NFL coach of the modern era: Art Shell, Los Angeles Raiders
- First African-American mayor of New York City: David Dinkins
- First African-American mayor of Seattle, Washington: Norm Rice
- First African-American Chairman of the Joint Chiefs of Staff: Colin Powell
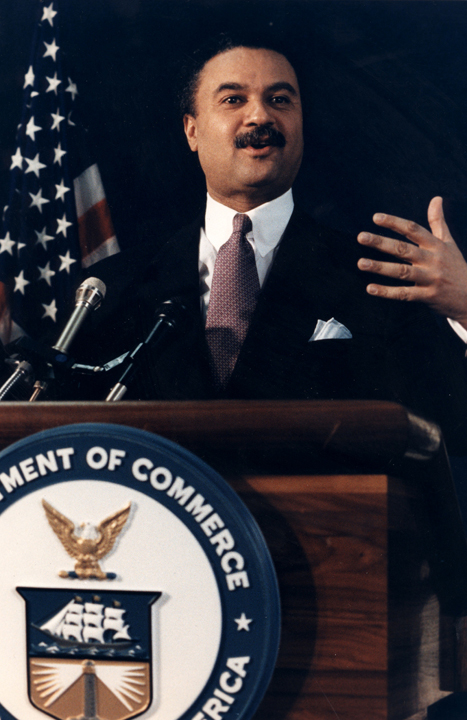
- Ron Brown
  First African-American woman (and first woman), ordained bishop in the Episcopal Church: Barbara Clementine Harris
- First African-American Chairman of the Democratic National Committee: Ron Brown
- First African-American woman transplant surgeon: Velma Scantlebury
- First African-American president of the Society for Adolescent Medicine: Renee Jenkins
- First African-American winner of the Academy Award for Best Sound: Willie D. Burton
- First woman officer to command a National Oceanic and Atmospheric Administration (NOAA) ship and the first African-American woman to command a ship for an extended period within the nation's uniformed services: Evelyn J. Fields
- First African-American president of the Society of Adolescent Medicine: Renee Jenkins
- First African-American president of the Society of Nuclear Medicine: Richard A. Holmes
- First African American elected president of the American Association for the Advancement of Science: Walter E. Massey
- First African American to be elected President of the National League (baseball): Bill White (first baseman)
- First African American to command a spaceflight when he led the STS-33 mission of Space Shuttle Discovery: Frederick D. Gregory
- First African American woman to earn a Ph.D. in Old Testament Studies (Princeton Theological Seminary): Renita J. Weems

=== 1990s ===
1990

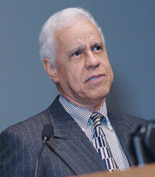
Douglas Wilder

- First elected African-American governor: Douglas Wilder (Virginia) (See also: Oscar Dunn, 1871)
- First African-American elected president of the Harvard Law Review: Barack Obama (See also: 2008, 2009)
- First African-American Miss USA: Carole Gist
- First African-American Playboy Playmate of the Year: Renee Tenison
- First African-American president of the American Medical Women's Association: Roselyn Payne Epps
- First African-American physician elected president of the American College of Obstetricians and Gynecologists: Ezra C. Davidson Jr.
- First African American commissioned in the U.S. Navy's music program: George N. Thompson Jr.
- First African American inducted into the NAB Broadcasting Hall of Fame: Hal Jackson
- First African-American woman appointed director of the Bureau of Primary Health Care in the U.S. Health Resources and Services Administration (HRSA): Marilyn Hughes Gaston
- First woman to earn the National Association for the Advancement of Colored People (NAACP) Chairman's Civil Rights Leadership Award: Esther Rolle

1991

- First African American to qualify for the Indianapolis 500 auto race: Willy T. Ribbs (See also: Ribbs, 1986)
- First African-American female and first female mayor of Washington, D.C.: Sharon Pratt Kelly
- First African-American woman to perform a back flip on the ice while figure skating: Rory Flack
- First African-American woman to dive to the ocean floor in the deep submersible ALVIN: Dawn Wright
- First African-American woman to earn a PhD in theoretical astrophysics: Reva Williams
- First African-American physician elected chair of the American Board of Internal Medicine: Gerald E. Thomson
- First African-American woman general officer of the U.S. Air Force (brigadier general): Marcelite J. Harris
- First African American appointed to the National Cancer Advisory Board: Zora Kramer Brown
- First African-American woman to earn a Ph.D. from the Yale University School of Forestry and Environmental Studies: Dorceta Taylor
- First African-American woman member of the American Cinema Editors: Lillian Benson
- First African American Chief Judge of any U.S. District Court in the State of Alabama (U.S. District Court for the Middle District of Alabama): Myron H. Thompson
- First African-American woman secretary of the United Church of Christ: Edith A. Guffey
- First African-American woman judge for the United States District Court for the Northern District of California: Saundra Brown Armstrong

1992

- First African-American female astronaut: Dr. Mae Jemison (Space Shuttle Endeavour)
- First African-American woman elected to U.S. Senate: Carol Moseley Braun (Illinois)
- First African-American woman to moderate a Presidential debate: Carole Simpson (second debate of 1992 campaign)
- First African American to sail solo around the world following the Age of Sail route around the southern tips of South America (Cape Horn) and Africa (Cape of Good Hope), avoiding the Panama and Suez Canals: Bill Pinkney
- First African-American Major League Baseball manager to reach (and win) the World Series: Cito Gaston (Toronto Blue Jays) 1992 World Series
- First African American to direct an animated film: Bruce W. Smith (Bebe's Kids)
- First African-American physician appointed to the Board of Trustees of the American College of Cardiology: Charles L. Curry
- First African-American president of the American Heart Association: Edward Sawyer Cooper
- First African American nominated for the Academy Award for Best Director (Boyz n the Hood): John Singleton
- First African-American and deaf woman to earn a doctoral degree: Shirley J. Allen
- First African-American woman District Judge in the United States District Court for the Eastern District of Missouri: Carol E. Jackson
- First African-American woman sheriff in the United States when elected in Fulton County, Georgia: Jacquelyn Barrett
- First woman and first African-American to head a major municipal public utility (Seattle City Light): Roberta Palm Bradley

1993

- First African American to serve as the U.S. secretary of commerce: Ron Brown
- First African American to serve as the U.S. secretary of agriculture: Mike Espy
- First African American to serve as the U.S. secretary of veteran affairs: Jesse Brown
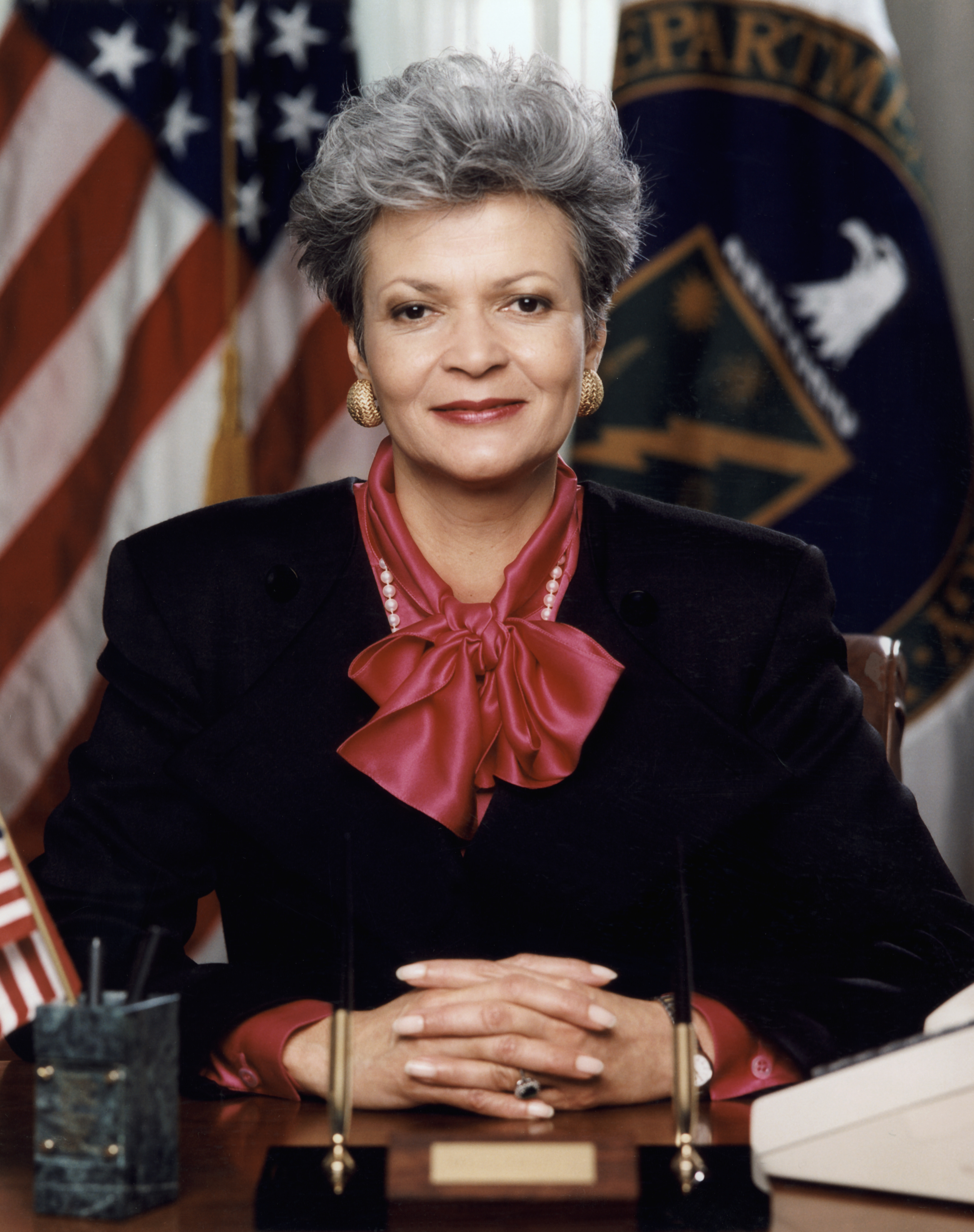
- Hazel O'Leary
  First African American and first woman to serve as the U.S. secretary of energy: Hazel R. O'Leary
- First African American to win the Nobel Prize for Literature: Toni Morrison
- First African-American woman named Poet Laureate of the United States since the position was created by an act of Congress in 1986 from the previous "consultant in poetry" position (1937–86): Rita Dove; also the youngest person named to that position
- First African-American appointed Director of the National Drug Control Policy: Lee P. Brown
- First African-American Director of the Centers for Disease Control and Prevention: David Satcher
- First African-American appointed Surgeon General of the United States: Joycelyn Elders
- First African American to serve as home plate umpire for World Series game: Charlie Williams for Game 4 of the 1993 World Series
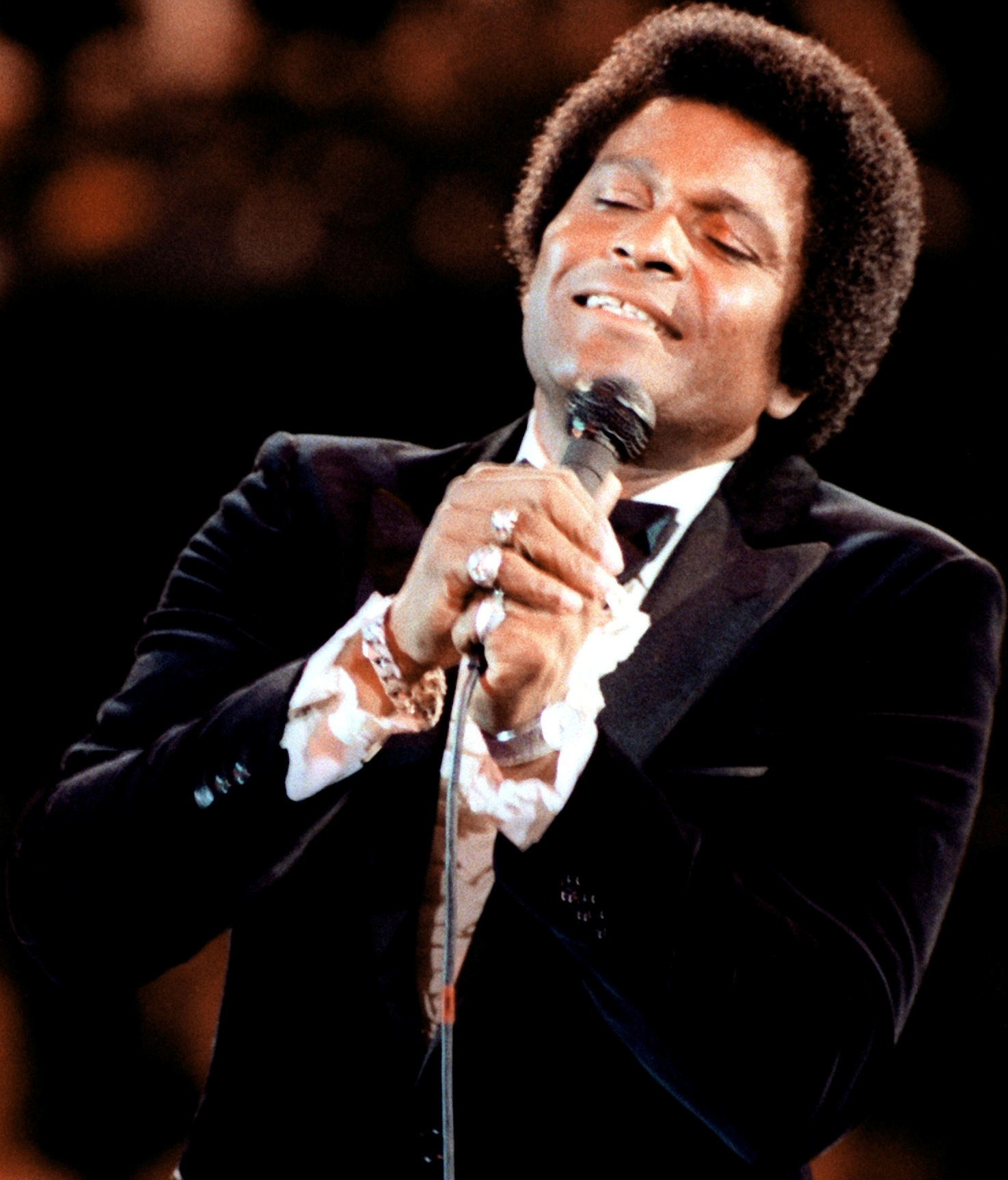
- Charley Pride
  First African American to be inducted as a member of the Grand Ole Opry: Charley Pride
- First African-American woman dean of a United States medical school (College of Osteopathic Medicine of Ohio University): Barbara Ross-Lee
- First African-American woman appointed to the Board of Directors of the Overseas Private Investment Corporation (OPIC): Lottie Shackelford
- First African-American Director of the Federal Highway Administration: Rodney E. Slater
- First African-American physician appointed national medical director of the United States Postal Service: David H. Reid III
- First African American elected president of the American Meteorological Society (AMS): Warren M. Washington
- Only artist commissioned to do the inaugural artwork for two U.S. presidents; first, in 1989, for the inauguration of President George H. W. Bush; and, in 1993, for the inauguration of President Bill Clinton: Phoebe Beasley
- First African-American woman and first woman to serve as the United States Attorney for the Western District of Oklahoma: Vicki Miles-LaGrange
- First woman (and African-American woman) to serve as United States Attorney for the Southern District of Texas: Gaynelle Griffin Jones
- First African-American woman elected state attorney general and served from 1993 to 1997 (Indiana Attorney General): Pamela Carter
- First African-American woman and first woman President of the American College of Dentists: Juliann Bluitt Foster
- First African-American woman and first woman President and Director-Counsel of the NAACP Legal Defense Fund: Elaine Jones
- First African-American woman to become editor in chief for a magazine with a non-predominantly Black consumer audience (Ms. magazine): Marcia Ann Gillespie
- First African-American woman to obtain board certification in Colon and Rectal Surgery in the United States: Debra Ford
- First woman president of the National Organization for the Professional Advancement of Black Chemists and Chemical Engineers (NOBCChE): Winifred Burks-Houck

1994

- First African-American female director of a major-studio movie: Darnell Martin (Columbia Pictures' I Like It Like That)
- First African-American (mixed-race) to win the United States Amateur Championship: Tiger Woods (Note: Woods' mixed ancestry – 1/4 Chinese, 1/4 Thai, 1/4 African-American, 1/8 white, and 1/8 Native American – also makes him the first Asian-American to achieve this feat. He is also the first of only four golfers of primarily non-European descent to win a men's major, with the others being Vijay Singh (an Indian Fijian), Michael Campbell (a Māori from New Zealand), and Y.E. Yang (South Korean).)
- First African-American woman to win the US Open Professional Figure Skating Championships: Rory Flack
- First African-American president of the American Osteopathic Association (AOA): William G. Anderson
- First African American woman chair of a university department of ophthalmology (University of Maryland School of Medicine): Eve Higginbotham
- First African American and first woman crew chief of the NASA Space Shuttle Crew Escape Equipment (CEE) processing department: Sharon Caples McDougle
- First African-American woman to be a police chief of any major city in the United States (Atlanta, Georgia): Beverly Harvard
- First African American appointed to the federal bench in the six-state United States District Court for the Western District of Oklahoma: Vicki Miles-LaGrange
- First African-American woman to host the Academy Awards (which she hosted again in 1996, 1999, and 2002: Whoopi Goldberg
- First African American to command the U.S. Navy's Blue Angels precision flying team: Donnie Cochran.
- First woman and the first African American U.S. Fire Administrator: Carrye B. Brown
- First African-American woman appointed to the U.S. Court of Appeals for the District of Columbia Circuit: Judith W. Rogers

1995

- First African-American inductee to the National Radio Hall of Fame: Hal Jackson
- First African-American Sergeant Major of the Army: Gene C. McKinney
- First African-American Miss Universe: Chelsi Smith
- First African-American personal diarist to a U.S. president (Bill Clinton): Janis F. Kearney
- First African American and first woman to serve as chairman of the US Nuclear Regulatory Commission (NRC): Shirley Ann Jackson
- First African-American woman to be elected to the American Medical Association Board of Trustees: Regina Benjamin
- First African American and first woman to be assistant director of the Federal Bureau of Investigation (FBI)): Carolyn G. Morris
- First African American elected president of the American Medical Association (AMA): Lonnie R. Bristow
- First African American to perform an extra-vehicular activity (spacewalk), during the second of his two Space Shuttle flights: Bernard A. Harris Jr.
- First woman chairperson of the National Association for the Advancement of Colored People (NAACP): Myrlie Evers-Williams
- First African-American president of the Associated Press Managing Editors: Robert G. McGruder
- First African-American dean of the University of Illinois College of Education: Mildred Barnes Griggs.
- First African-American woman to chair a math department in the United States (University of Montana): Gloria Conyers Hewitt
- First African-American woman to earn a Doctor of Ministry degree at Princeton Theological Seminary: Angelique Walker-Smith
- First African-American woman to head a cancer center when she became the director of the Howard University Cancer Center in Washington D.C.: Lucile Adams-Campbell
- First woman and first African-American woman appointed to the U.S. Senate Finance Committee: Carol Moseley Braun
- First African-American woman to become a fellow of the American Society of Colon and Rectal Surgeons: Debra Ford
- First Black inspector general for the U.S. Department of the Interior: Wilma A. Lewis
- First African American to receive Library Journal’s Librarian of the Year Award: Carla Hayden

1996

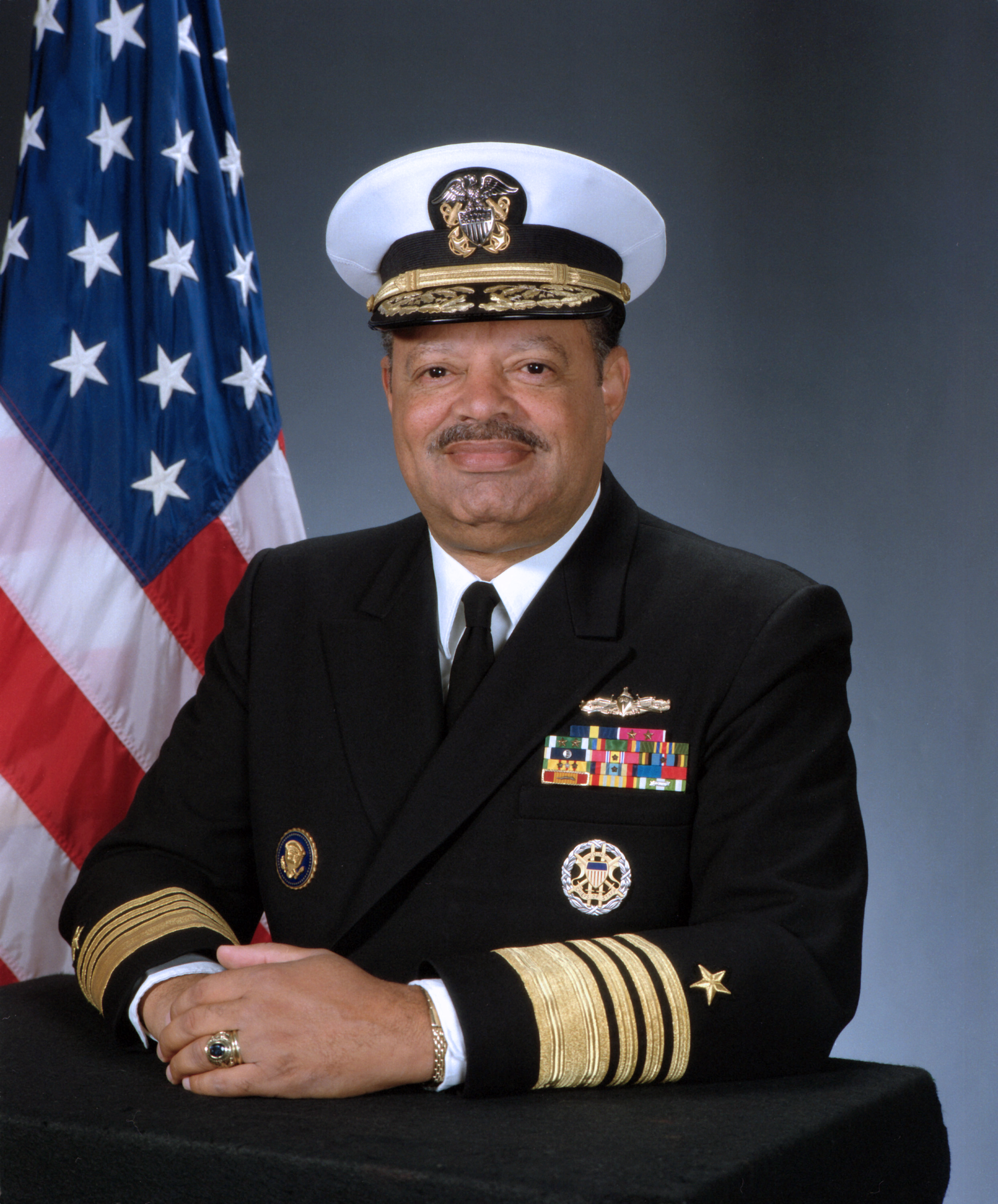
- J. Paul Reason
  First African-American U.S. Navy four-star admiral: J. Paul Reason
- First African-American MLB general manager to win the World Series: Bob Watson (New York Yankees), 1996 World Series
- First African American elected president of the Society of Automotive Engineers: Claude A. Verbal
- First African American to win the Pulitzer Prize for Music: George Walker
- First African American appointed the chief of engineers for the United States Army Corps of Engineers: Joe N. Ballard
- First woman and first African-American woman to be named director of a Department of Energy laboratory (New Brunswick Laboratory): Margaret E. M. Tolbert
- First African-American Chief Magistrate Judge in the federal judiciary, serving the United States District Court for the District of Massachusetts: Joyce London Alexander
- First African-American woman president of the State Bar of Michigan: Victoria A. Roberts

1997

- First African American (mixed-race) to win a men's major golf championship: Tiger Woods (The Masters)
- First African-American model to appear solo on the cover of Sports Illustrated Swimsuit Edition: Tyra Banks
- First African-American UFC champion: Maurice Smith
- First African-American Director of the National Park Service: Robert Stanton
- First African American to be elected a Fellow of the Association for Computing Machinery (ACM): Clarence Ellis
- First African American to serve as the U.S. secretary of labor: Alexis Herman
- First African-American woman and first woman to serve as chief judge of the United States District Court for the District of Columbia: Norma Holloway Johnson
- First African-American physician elected president of the American College of Occupational and Environmental Medicine: Robert Shaw Rhodes
- First African-American woman tomb guard for the Tomb of the Unknown Soldier (Arlington): Danyell E. Wilson
- First African-American and first African-American woman to win an Emmy Award for casting (The Tuskegee Airmen): Robi Reed
- First African-American woman president of the National Nurses Society on Addictions, now known as the International Nurses Society on Addictions (IntNSA): Karen Allen
- First woman and first African-American woman to serve as vice-president of the International Olympic Committee (IOC) executive committee: Anita DeFrantz
- First African-American woman magistrate judge for the United States District Court for the District of New Jersey: Susan D. Wigenton
- First African-American woman deputy administrator of the Federal Highway Administration (FHWA): Gloria J. Jeff

1998

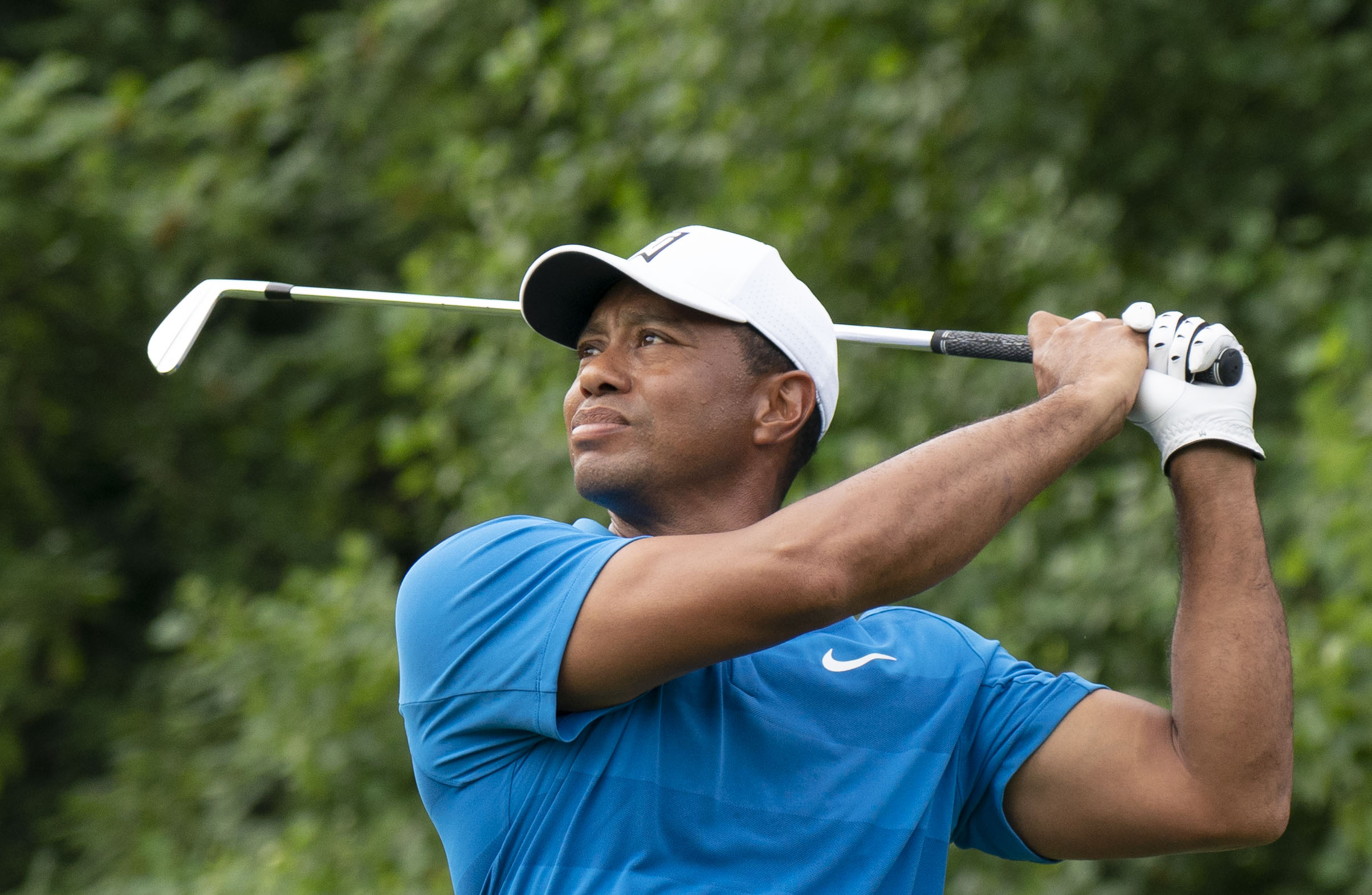
Tiger Woods

- First African-American female rear admiral in the U.S. Navy: Lillian Fishburne
- First African American promoted to flag rank in the Coast Guard: Erroll M. Brown
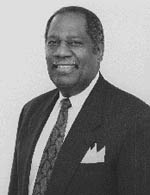
- Robert Stanton
  First African-American Master Chief Petty Officer of the Coast Guard: Vincent W. Patton III
- First African American (mixed-race) to play in the Presidents Cup: Tiger Woods
- First African American to lie in honor at the U.S. Capitol: Jacob Chestnut (See also: 2005, 2019)
- First African-American to earn a Ph.D. in paper science: Chavonda Jacobs-Young
- First African-American woman to serve as a director of an institute of the NIH, acting in that capacity for the National Institute of Neorological Disorders and Stroke (NINDS): Audrey S. Penn
- First African-American man appointed to the position of Surgeon General of the United States: David Satcher
- First African American to be inducted into the National Radio Hall of Fame in Chicago, Illinois: Tom Joyner
- First African-American woman awarded the Henry Johnson Fisher award by the Magazine Publishers of America: Susan L. Taylor
- First African-American woman elected to serve as a State Treasurer in the United States and the first African-American woman elected to a statewide office in Connecticut: Denise Nappier
- First African-American woman judge on the United States District Court for the District of Nevada: Johnnie B. Rawlinson
- First African American president of the National Conference of State Legislatures (NCSL): Dan Blue
- First African-American woman to serve as Chief Judge on the United States District Court for the Eastern District of Michigan: Anna Diggs Taylor
- First woman and first African American president of the Fashion Institute of Technology: Joyce F. Brown
- First African-American woman basketball player to receive the Sullivan Award as the top amateur athlete in America: Chamique Holdsclaw
- First African-American woman president of the League of Women Voters: Carolyn Jefferson-Jenkins
- First person of color to be chairperson of the International Association of Business Communicators (IABC) international executive board: Brenda C. Siler
- First African-American woman captain in U.S. passenger commercial aviation history (United Airlines): M'Lis Ward
- First woman and first Black woman U.S. Attorney for the District of Columbia: Wilma A. Lewis
- First woman to hit a tennis serve at 125 mph (clocked at Wimbledon): Venus Williams

1999

- First African American to be awarded the Grandmaster title in chess: Maurice Ashley
- First African-American Sergeant Major of the Marine Corps: Alford L. McMichael
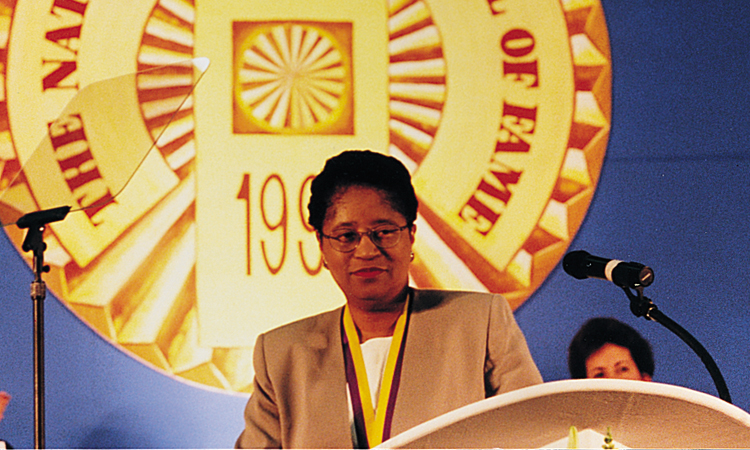
  Shirley Ann Jackson
- First African-American woman to lead a top-ranked research university when named the 18th president of Rensselaer Polytechnic Institute: Shirley Ann Jackson
- First African-American woman to serve on the United States Court of Appeals for the Seventh Circuit: Ann Claire Williams
- First African-American woman to head a publicly traded corporation when media company Radio One (Urban One), which she founded, went public: Cathy Hughes
- First African American and first woman to be promoted to Director of White House Photography: Sharon Farmer
- First African-American president of the Society of Women Engineers (SWE): Sherita Ceasar
- First African American to become an instructor at the U.S. Coast Guard's Chief Petty Officers’ Academy: Angela McShan
- First African American to become director of the National Oceanic and Atmospheric Administration (NOAA) Corps and NOAA's Office of Marine and Aviation Operations as well as the first woman to become a NOAA Corps rear admiral: Evelyn J. Fields
- First African-American woman to coach a team to the NCAA Division I women's basketball tournament national championship (Purdue Boilermakers): Carolyn Peck

== 21st century ==
=== 2000s ===
2000

- First African-American nominated for Vice President of the United States by a Federal Election Commission-recognized and federally funded political party: Ezola B. Foster (See also: 1952, 2020; FEC established in 1975)
- First African American to be inducted into the Country Music Hall of Fame: Charley Pride
- First African American to be elected Republican state party chair in the United States: Michael Steele
- First woman to serve as president of the Association of Black Cardiologists: Elizabeth Ofili
- First African-American woman to be promoted to Master Chief Petty Officer in the U.S. Coast Guard: Angela McShan
- First African-American woman and first woman to be elected bishop of the African Methodist Episcopal Church: Vashti Murphy McKenzie
- First African-American woman judge appointed to the United States Court of Appeals for the Ninth Circuit: Johnnie B. Rawlinson
- First African American United States circuit judge to serve on the United States Court of Appeals for the Fourth Circuit: Roger Gregory
- First African-American woman fighter pilot in the United States Air Force (USAF): Shawna Kimbrell

2001

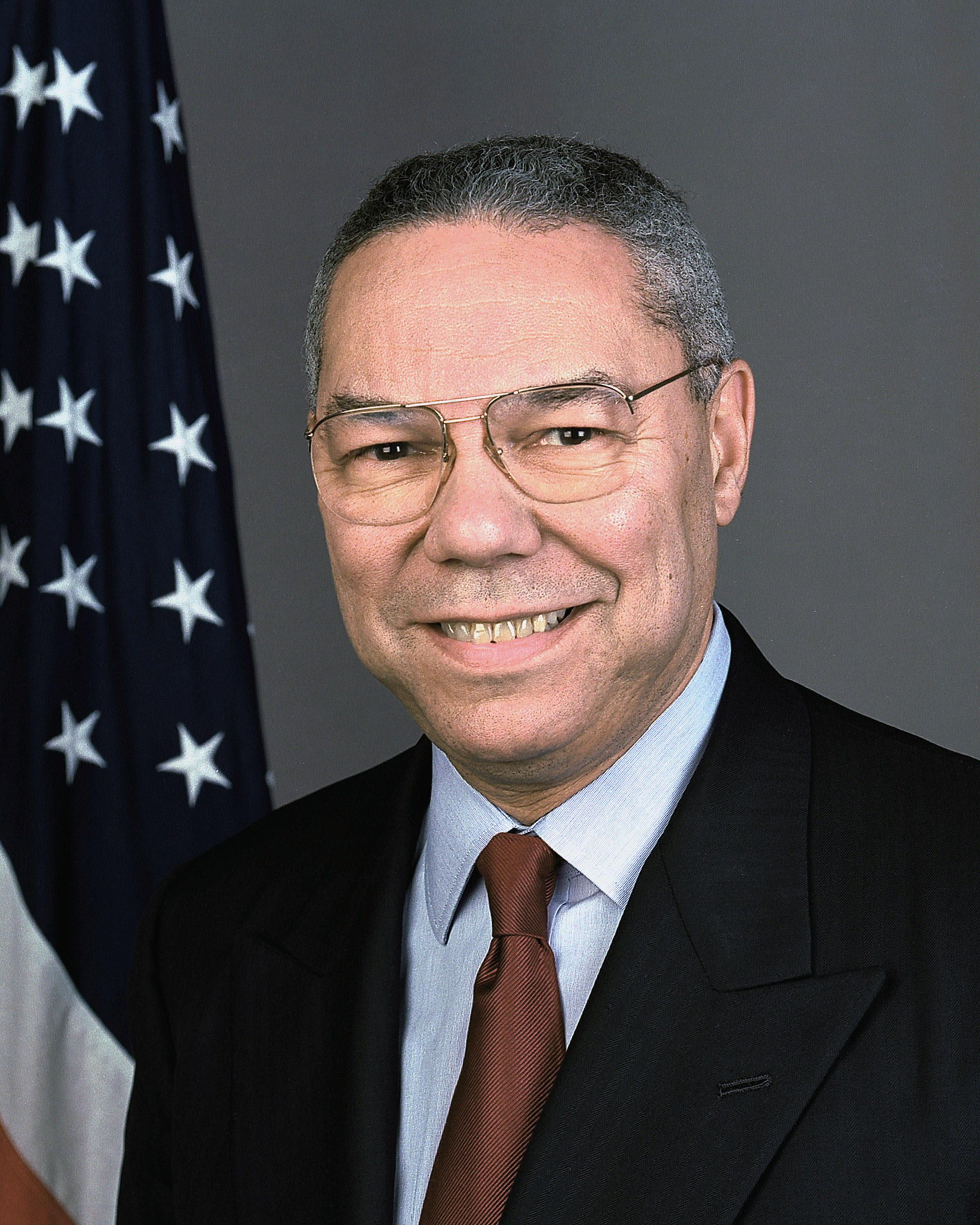
Official portrait of Colin Powell, 2001

- First African American (biracial) to serve as the U.S. secretary of state: Colin Powell
- First African American to serve as the U.S. secretary of education: Rod Paige
- First African-American president of the United States Conference of Catholic Bishops: The Most Reverend Wilton Daniel Gregory (see also: 2020)
- First African-American president of the Unitarian Universalist Association: Rev. William G. Sinkford
- First African-American president of an Ivy League university: Ruth J. Simmons at Brown University
- First African-American woman and first woman National Security Advisor: Condoleezza Rice (See also: 2005)
- First African-American billionaire: Robert L. Johnson, founder of Black Entertainment Television (See also: 2002)
- First African-American woman billionaire: Sheila Johnson
- First African-American broadcaster to call a Super Bowl: Greg Gumbel (Super Bowl XXXV)
- First African American to win the Academy Award for Best Actress: Halle Berry
- First woman and first African-American woman Chief Judge for the United States District Court for the Central District of California: Consuelo Bland Marshall
- First African-American woman federal judge for the United States District Court for the District of Kansas: Julie A. Robinson

2002

- First African American to become majority owner of a U.S. major sports league team: Robert L. Johnson (Charlotte Bobcats, NBA) (Note: Announced as Bobcats owner in December 2002, although the team did not begin to play until 2004.) (See also: 2001)
- First African-American Winter Olympic gold medal winner: Vonetta Flowers (two-woman bobsleigh)
- First African-American woman combat pilot in the U.S. Armed Forces: Captain Vernice Armour, U.S. Marine Corps (USMC) (See also: 2008)
- First African-American (half-Caucasian) to win an Oscar: Halle Berry (Best Lead Actress, Monster's Ball, 2001)
- First African-American to receive the EGOT (Emmy, Grammy, Oscar, and Tony Awards): Whoopi Goldberg
- First African-American woman to be ranked #1 in tennis: Venus Williams
- First African American to be named year-end world champion by the International Tennis Federation: Serena Williams
- First African-American Arena Football League head coach to win ArenaBowl: Darren Arbet (San Jose SaberCats), ArenaBowl XVI
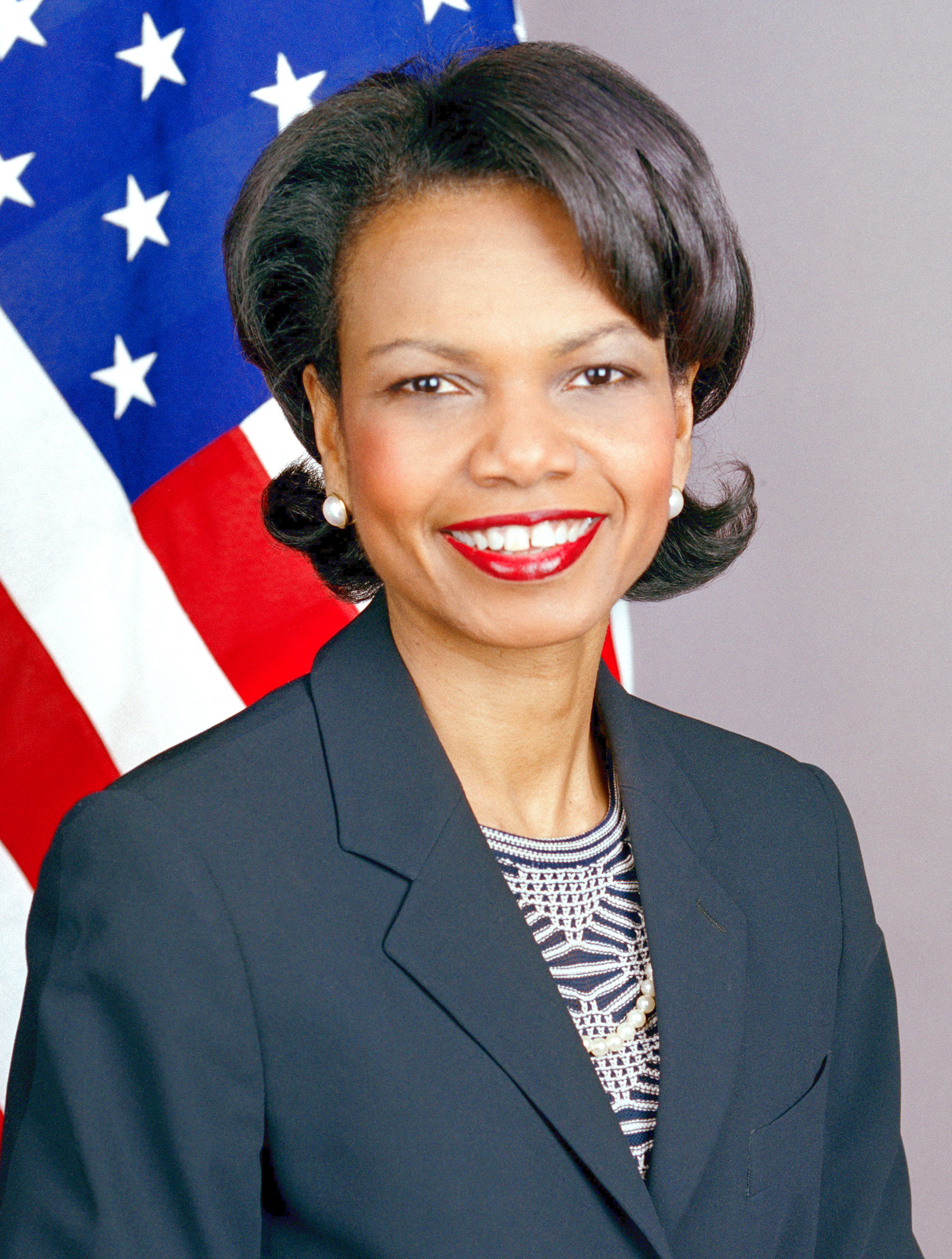
- Condoleezza Rice
  First African-American general manager in the National Football League: Ozzie Newsome (Baltimore Ravens)
- First African-American woman to win the Pulitzer Prize for Drama (Topdog/Underdog): Suzan-Lori Parks
- First African-American woman Chief Judge for the United States District Court for the Eastern District of Missouri: Carol E. Jackson

2003

- First African-American (half-Asian) woman to be elected District Attorney in the United States: Kamala Harris (San Francisco) (See also: 2020, 2021, and 2024)
- First African-American woman to be ordained in the Church of the Brethren: Belita D. Mitchell
- First African American to win a Career Grand Slam in tennis: Serena Williams (See also: Althea Gibson, 1956; Arthur Ashe, 1968)
- First African-American American Bar Association president: Dennis Archer

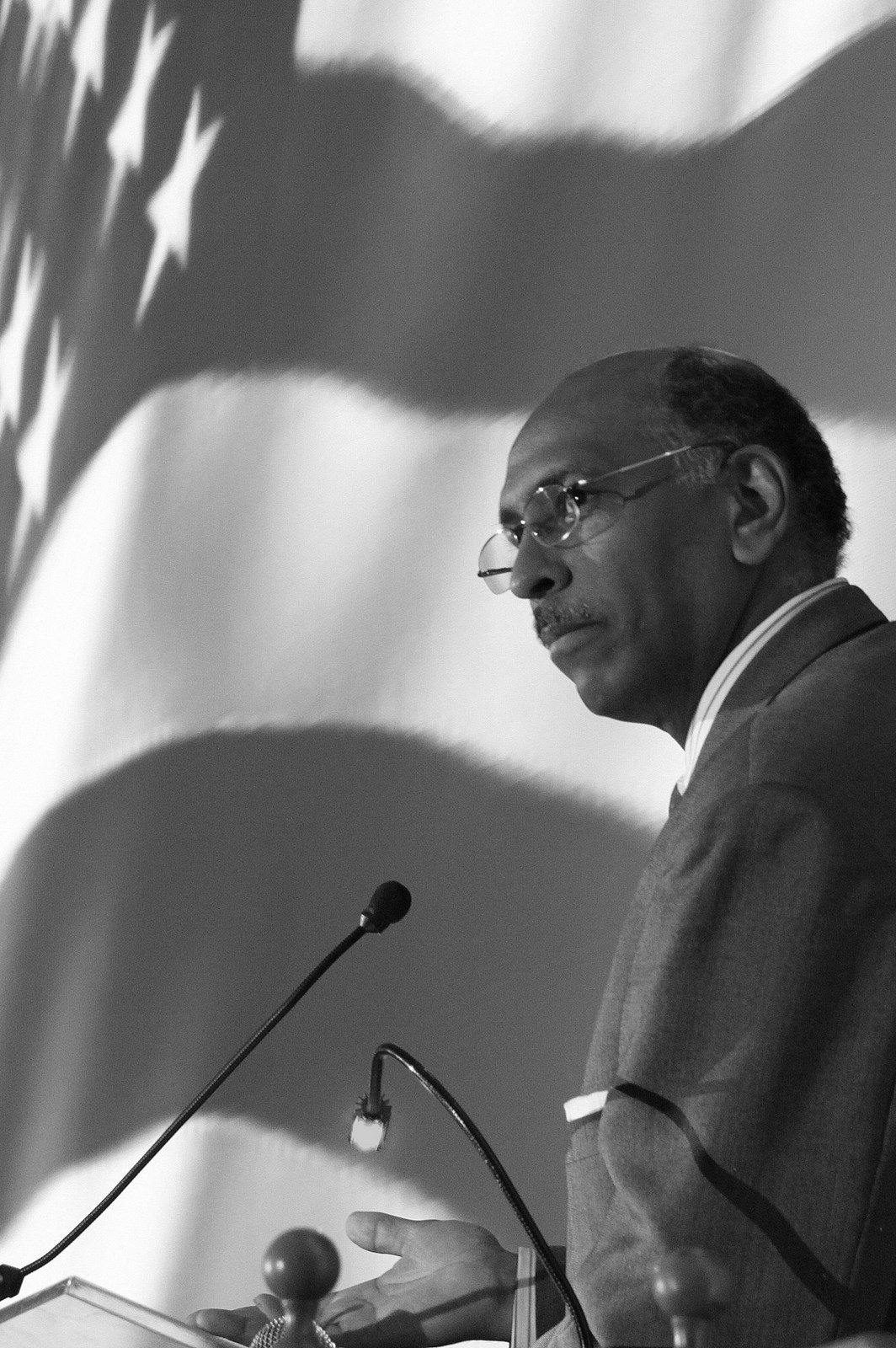
*Michael Steele

- First African American elected to statewide office in Maryland. (Lt. Governor): Michael Steele
- First African-American woman to serve as a lieutenant governor in the United States: Jennette Bradley
- First African-American woman to serve on the United States Court of Appeals for the Fourth Circuit: Allyson K. Duncan

2004

- First African-American inducted into the World Golf Hall of Fame: Charlie Sifford
- First African-American NBA general manager to win the NBA Finals: Joe Dumars (Detroit Pistons), 2004 NBA Finals
- First African-American Canadian Football League head coach to reach (and win) the Grey Cup: Pinball Clemons (Toronto Argonauts), 92nd Grey Cup
- First African-American woman to fly the U.S. Air Force's U-2 spy plane: Merryl Tengesdal
- First African-American woman to earn a place on the U.S. Olympic Swim Team, where she won a silver medal on the 4×100 freestyle relay: Maritza Correia
- First African American to earn the Tony Award for Best Actress in a Play, for a revival of A Raisin in the Sun: Phylicia Rashad
- First African-American woman federal judge on the United States District Court for the Southern District of Florida: Marcia G. Cooke
- First African-American woman district judge for the United States District Court for the Eastern District of New York: Sandra L. Townes

2005

- First African-American woman Secretary of State: Condoleezza Rice (See also: 2001)
- First African-American women to lead a major transportation agency in the U.S. serving on the BART Board of Directors: Carole Ward Allen and Lynette Sweet
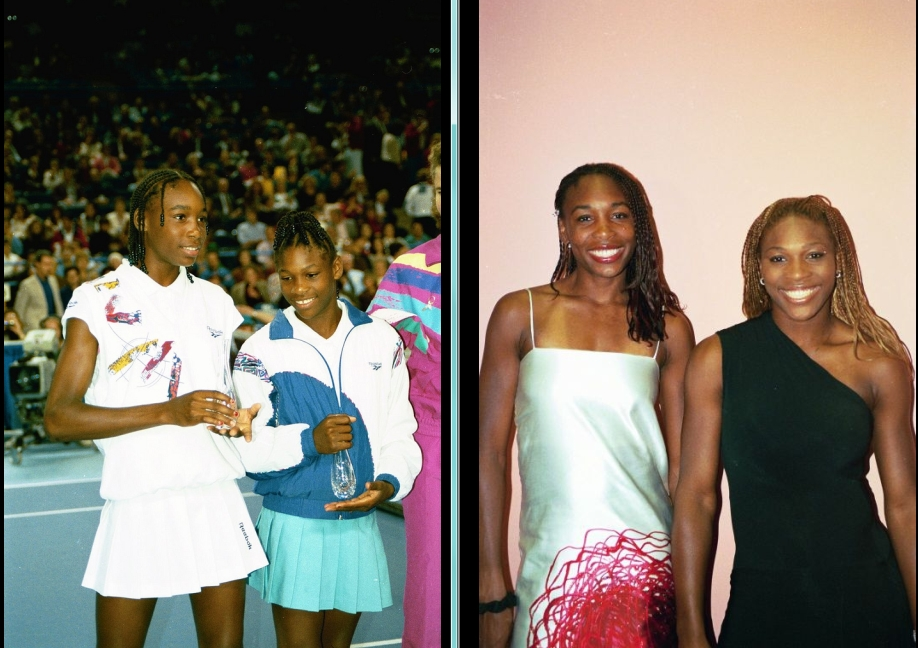
- Venus and Serena Williams
  First African-American woman U.S. Coast Guard aviator: Jeanine Menze
- First African-American woman (and first woman), to lie in honor at the U.S. Capitol: Rosa Parks (See also: 1998, 2019)
- First African-American woman chief justice of a state supreme court in the United States when she became Chief Justice of the Supreme Court of Georgia: Leah Ward Sears

2006

- First African American to command a U.S. Marine Corps division: Major General Walter E. Gaskin
- First African-American individual Winter Olympic gold medal winner: Shani Davis (men's 1,000-meter speed skating)
- First African American to reach the peak of Mount Everest: Sophia Danenberg
- First African-American woman to receive Dharma transmission in Zen Buddhism: Merle Kodo Boyd
- First African-American quarterback inducted into the Pro Football Hall of Fame: Warren Moon
- First African-American Lady of Turks and Caicos Islands: LisaRaye McCoy
- First African-American woman to obtain a web-based software patent: Janet Emerson Bashen
- First African American United States circuit judge to serve on the United States Court of Appeals for the Tenth Circuit: Jerome Holmes

2007

- First known African-American woman to reach the North Pole: Barbara Hillary
- First African-American White House Chief Usher: Stephen Rochon
- First African-American NFL head coaches to reach the Super Bowl: Lovie Smith and Tony Dungy, Super Bowl XLI (Note: Smith and Dungy both reached this milestone on the same day, although Smith was technically the first due solely to scheduling. The NFC and AFC Championship Games are always held on the same day. In the playoffs that followed the 2006 NFL season, the NFC game was played first.)
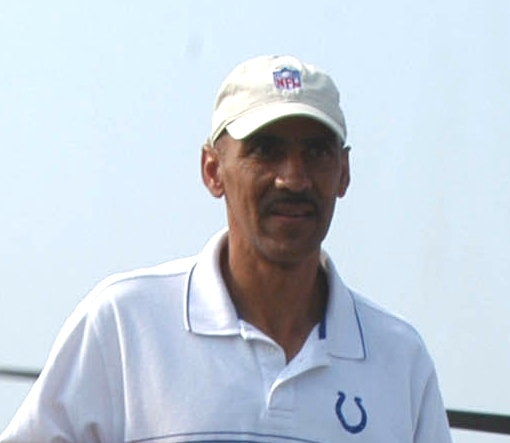
- Tony Dungy
  First African-American NFL coach to win a Super Bowl: Tony Dungy (Super Bowl XLI)
- First African-American president of the American Academy of Pediatrics: Renee Jenkins
- First African American to serve as the clerk of the United States House of Representatives: Lorraine Miller
- First African-American woman president of the American Political Science Association: Dianne Pinderhughes
- First African-American woman judge appointed to the federal court in New England (United States District Court for the District of Connecticut): Vanessa Lynne Bryant

2008

- First African American to be nominated as a major-party U.S. presidential candidate: Barack Obama, Democratic Party
- First African-American (half-Caucasian) elected President of the United States: Barack Obama
- First African American First Lady: Michelle Obama
- First African American to referee a Super Bowl game: Mike Carey (Super Bowl XLII)
- First African-American woman elected Speaker of a state House of Representatives: California Rep. Karen Bass
- First African American to be appointed to the United States Senate by a state governor: Roland Burris
- First African-American woman combat pilot in the U.S. Air Force: Major Shawna Rochelle Kimbrell (See also: 2002)
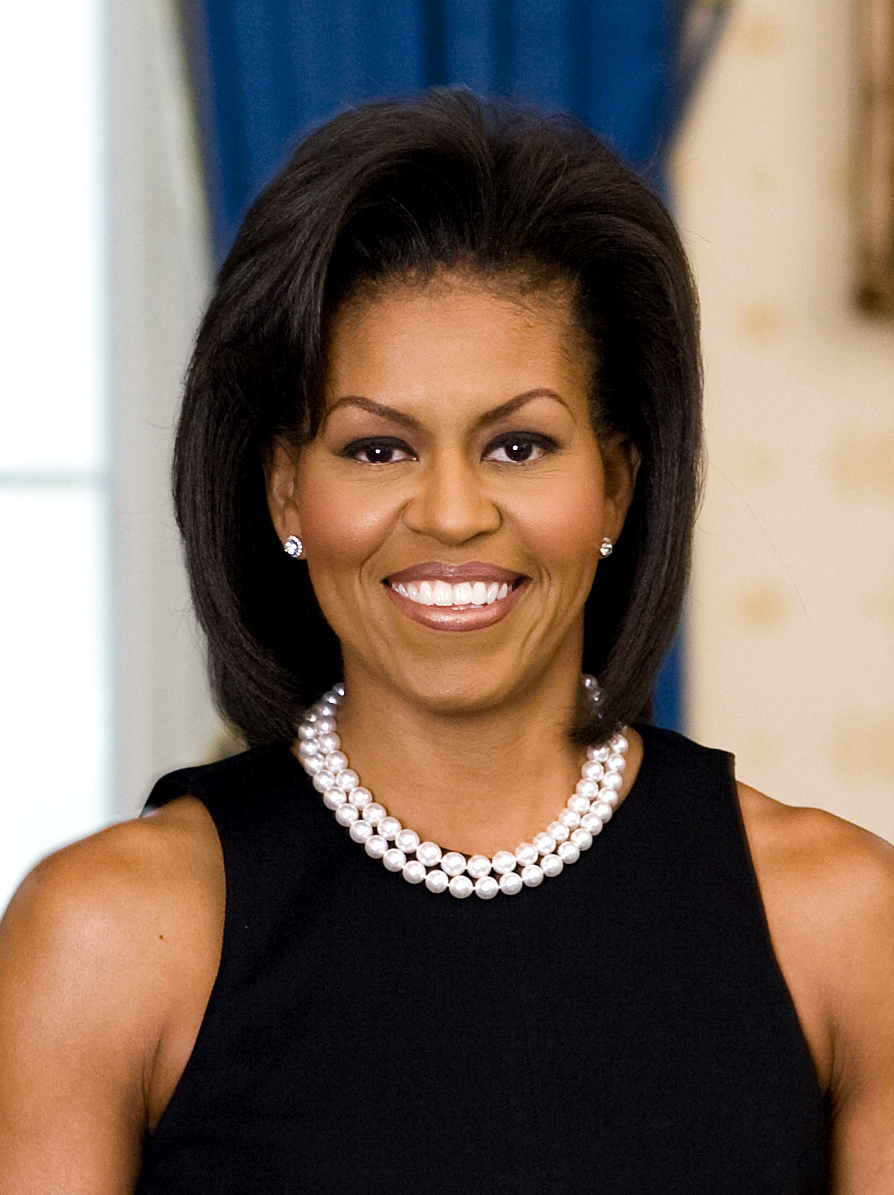
- Michelle Obama
  First African-American NFL general manager to win the Super Bowl: Jerry Reese (New York Giants), Super Bowl XLII
- First African American and the first woman to be appointed dean of Harvard College: Evelynn M. Hammonds
- Developed the first orthotropic xenograft model of metastatic Ewing's sarcoma while simultaneously completing the first cytoreductive surgery and hyper-thermic intraperitoneal chemotherapy HIPEC for children with sarcomatosis, which improved the survival rate from 15 percent to over 60 percent: Andrea Hayes-Jordan
- First African American to be elected president of the American Sociological Association (ASA): Patricia Hill Collins
- First African-American woman elected president of the American Academy of Religion (AAR): Emilie Townes

2009

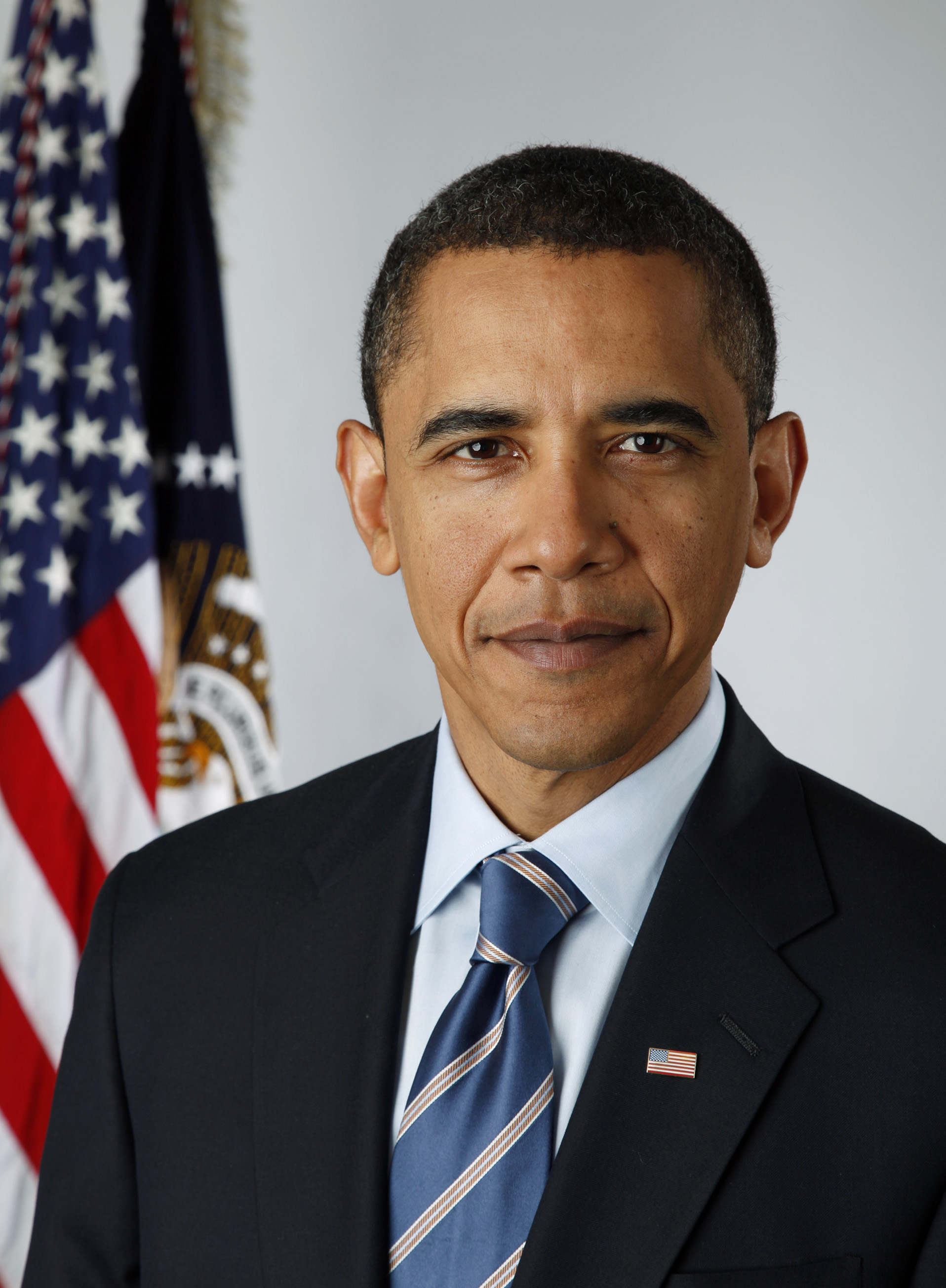
Official portrait of Barack Obama, 2009

- First African-American President of the United States: Barack Obama
- First African-American First Lady of the United States: Michelle Obama
- First African-American chair of the Republican National Committee: Michael Steele
- First African-American United States Attorney General: Eric Holder
- First African-American woman United States Ambassador to the United Nations: Susan Rice
- First African-American United States Trade Representative: Ron Kirk
- First African-American woman Administrator of the Environmental Protection Agency: Lisa P. Jackson
- First African-American White House Social Secretary: Desirée Rogers
- First African American to appear by himself on a circulating U.S. coin: Duke Ellington (District of Columbia quarter).
- First African-American Administrator of the National Aeronautics and Space Administration: Charles F. Bolden Jr.
- First African-American woman rabbi: Alysa Stanton
- First African-American woman CEO of a Fortune 500 company: Ursula Burns, Xerox Corporation.
- First African-American doubles team to be named year-end world champion by the International Tennis Federation: Serena and Venus Williams
- First African-American recipient of the Pulitzer Prize in History: Annette Gordon-Reed
- First African American to win the Academy Award for Best Documentary (Short Subject): Roger Ross Williams
- First African-American woman judge for the United States Court of Appeals for the First Circuit: O. Rogeriee Thompson
- First African American appointed to serve as a United States Attorney for the Southern District of Alabama: Kenyen R. Brown
- First African American and first woman president of the American Association of State Colleges and Universities: Muriel A. Howard

=== 2010s ===
2010

- First African American to win the Stanley Cup: Dustin Byfuglien with the Chicago Blackhawks
- First African-American winner of the Academy Award for Best Adapted Screenplay (Precious): Geoffrey S. Fletcher
- First African American and first African-American woman United States circuit judge to serve on the United States Court of Appeals for the First Circuit: O. Rogeriee Thompson
- First African-American woman and first woman U.S. Attorney to serve in Louisiana when she became the United States Attorney for the Western District of Louisiana, in Lafayette, Louisiana: Stephanie A. Finley
- First African-American woman to serve on the federal bench in Massachusetts, upon her appointment as a district judge for the United States District Court for the District of Massachusetts: Denise J. Casper
- First African American and first African-American woman United States federal judge in the state of Indiana (United States District Court for the Southern District of Indiana): Tanya Walton Pratt

2011

- First African-American Director of the Federal Bureau of Prisons: Charles E. Samuels Jr.
- First African-American admitted to the Reconstructionist Rabbinical College: Sandra Lawson
- First African-American woman to serve as acting chair of the Democratic National Committee: Donna Brazile
- First African-American woman to reach the South Pole: Barbara Hillary
- First African American and the first woman to hold the post of United States Ambassador-at-Large for International Religious Freedom in the State Department: Suzan Johnson Cook
- First African-American woman to achieve the rank of major general in the U.S. Army Reserves: Marcia Anderson
- First African-American woman to serve on the United States Court of Appeals for the Sixth Circuit: Bernice B. Donald
- First African-American woman to serve as a judge for the United States District Court for the Eastern District of Louisiana: Nannette Jolivette Brown
- First African-American woman to serve as a United States circuit judge for the United States Court of Appeals for the Federal Circuit: Tiffany P. Cunningham
- First African-American U.S. Attorney for the United States District Court for the Northern District of Mississippi: Felicia C. Adams

2012

- First African American to be re-elected President of the United States: Barack Obama
- First African-American Combatant Commander of United States Central Command: Lloyd Austin
- First African-American elected president of the Southern Baptist Convention (SBC): Fred Luter
- First African-American woman to take command of a navy missile destroyer: Monika Washington Stoker
- First African-American woman to win the Best Director award in the U.S. dramatic competition at the Sundance Film Festival: Ava DuVernay
- First African-American woman to qualify in submarines (USS Georgia (SSGN 729) Gold): Tabitha Strobel
- First African-American woman to win the artistic gymnastics Olympic individual all-around title; and the first gymnast (male or female) and the first African American to win both the individual all-around gold and the team gold in the same Olympic Games: Gabby Douglas
- First African American to win the Academy Award for Best Documentary Feature: T. J. Martin

2013

- First African-American U.S. senator from the former Confederacy since Reconstruction: Tim Scott
- First African-American president of the Academy of Motion Picture Arts and Sciences: Cheryl Boone Isaacs
- First African-American United States Secretary of Homeland Security: Jeh Johnson
- First African-American to receive a full-length statue in the United States Capitol: Rosa Parks
- First African-American woman selected to be interim president of the National Association for the Advancement of Colored People (NAACP): Lorraine Miller
- First African American (and African-American woman) chief judge of the United States Court of Federal Claims: Patricia E. Campbell-Smith
- First African-American woman to serve as judge for the United States District Court for the Northern District of Mississippi: Debra M. Brown
- First African-American woman and first woman to serve as Chief Judge of the United States District Court for the Eastern District of Pennsylvania: Petrese B. Tucker
- First African American Chief Judge for the United States District Court for the District of Arizona: Raner Collins

2014

- First African-American woman four-star admiral: Michelle J. Howard
- First African-American senator to be elected in the South since Reconstruction: Tim Scott, elected in South Carolina
- First African-American player named to the USA Curtis Cup Team: Mariah Stackhouse
- First African-American transgender woman to appear on the cover of Time magazine: Laverne Cox
- First African-American woman to be included in the White House's permanent art collection: Alma Thomas
- First African-American woman to be nominated for a Golden Globe Award for Best Director for her work on Selma: Ava DuVernay
- First woman and the first African American to lead Trinity College (Connecticut): Joanne Berger-Sweeney
- First African American and first woman to lead the Agricultural Research Service (ARS): Chavonda Jacobs-Young
- First African-American winner of the Academy Award for Best Picture: Steve McQueen
- First African-American woman to serve on a federal district court in North Carolina (United States District Court for the Middle District of North Carolina): Loretta Copeland Biggs
- First African-American woman to serve as a judge of the United States Tax Court: Tamara W. Ashford
- First African-American woman federal judge to serve on a federal district court in Georgia (United States District Court for the Middle District of Georgia): Leslie Abrams
- First African-American woman federal judge to serve on the United States District Court for the Northern District of Georgia: Eleanor L. Ross
- First African-American woman federal judge to serve on the United States District Court for the Southern District of Illinois: Staci M. Yandle

2015

- First African American to lead a major intelligence agency: Vincent R. Stewart, Defense Intelligence Agency
- First African-American commissioner of a major North American sports league: Jeffrey Orridge, Canadian Football League
- First African-American woman Attorney General of the United States: Loretta Lynch
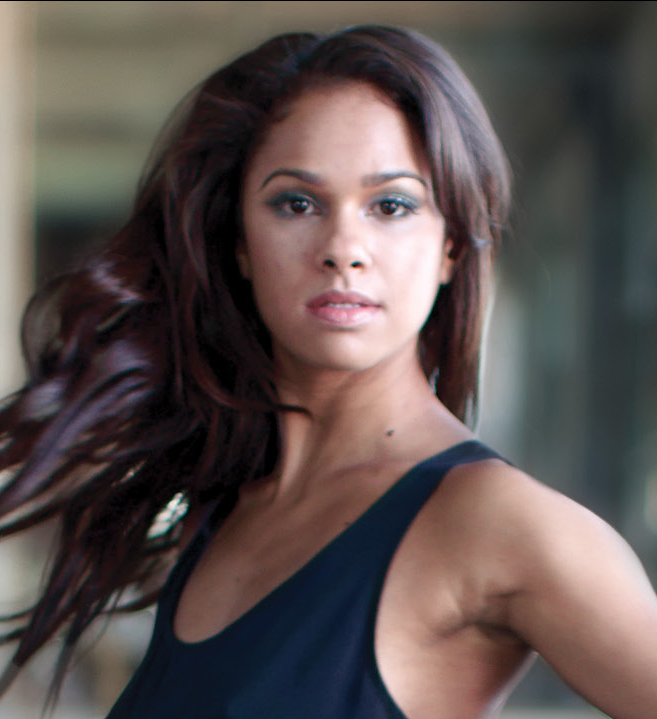
- Misty Copeland
  First African-American female principal dancer for the American Ballet Theatre: Misty Copeland
- First African American to be inducted into the NASCAR Hall of Fame: Wendell Scott (See also: 1953)
- First African-American sole anchor of a network evening newscast: Lester Holt
- First African-American elected as presiding bishop of the Episcopal Church: Bishop Michael Curry
- First woman of color president of the American Bar Association: Paulette Brown
- First African American to be appointed Surgeon General of the United States Army and the first African-American woman to be promoted to Lieutenant General: Nadja West
- First female medical oncologist to serve as president of the National Medical Association, the nation's oldest professional society for black physicians: Edith Mitchell
- First woman and first person of color appointed as head of an academic department in the School of Engineering at the Massachusetts Institute of Technology (MIT) when she was appointed head of the Chemical Engineering department: Paula T. Hammond

2016

- First African-American president of a major broadcast TV network: Channing Dungey
- First African-American Librarian of Congress: Dr. Carla Hayden
- First African-American woman to be elected a diocesan bishop in the Episcopal Church: Jennifer Baskerville-Burrows
- First African American to serve as president of Wellesley College: Paula Johnson
- First woman and the first African American to win the National Portrait Gallery's Outwin Boochever Portrait Competition: Amy Sherald
- First woman and the first African American elected co-chair of The Caucus for Producers, Writers & Directors: Tanya Hart
- First African-American woman to win an Olympic gold medal in an individual swimming event (100 m freestyle at the 2016 Summer Olympics in Rio de Janeiro): Simone Manuel
- First African-American woman appointed to the United States District Court for the District of Minnesota: Wilhelmina Wright

2017

- First African-American CEO of a Major League Baseball team: Derek Jeter
- First African-American to win the University of Mary Washington Historic Preservation Book Prize: Catherine Fleming Bruce
- First African-American woman to earn the role of First Captain, leader of the West Point Corps of Cadets: Simone Askew
- First African-American woman to be nominated for an Academy Award for Best Director for a feature-length documentary at the 89th Oscars: Ava DuVernay
- First African-American woman to direct a live-action film with a budget of over $100 million: Ava DuVernay
- First woman goalkeeper and first African-American woman to be elected to the National Soccer Hall of Fame: Briana Scurry
- First African-American woman to win the Primetime Emmy Award for Outstanding Writing for a Comedy Series: Lena Waithe
- First African-American woman president of the American Society for Engineering Education (ASEE): Bevlee Watford
- First African-American woman in a NASCAR Cup Series pit crew: Brehanna Daniels
- First African-American woman inducted into the American Advertising Federation Hall of Fame: Carol H. Williams
- First woman and first African American to create three television dramas that have achieved the 100 episode milestone: Shonda Rhimes
- First African-American woman to serve as district attorney in the Commonwealth of Pennsylvania: Kelley B. Hodge
- First African American and first woman administrator of the Pulitzer Prizes: Dana Canedy

2018

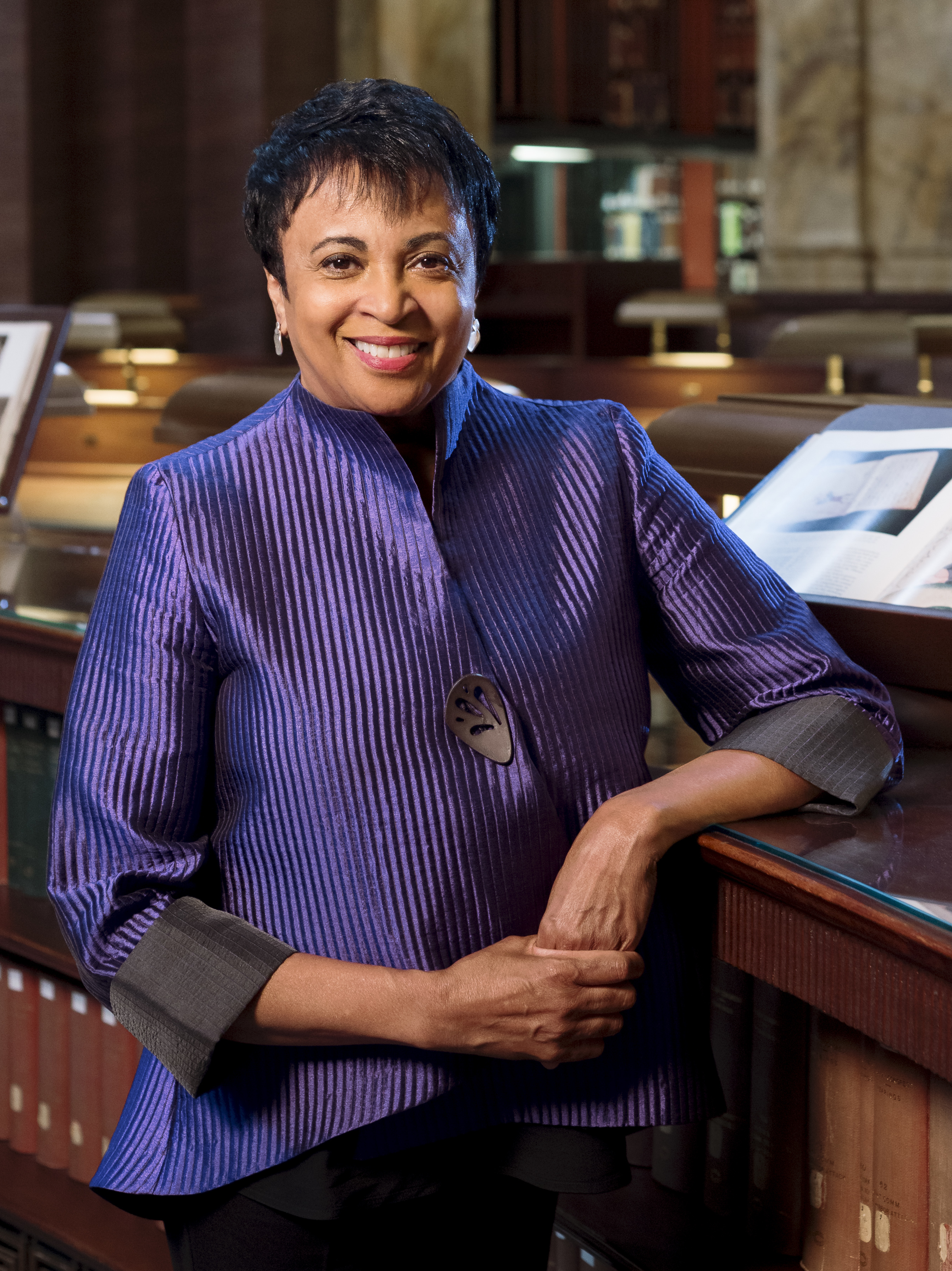
- Carla Hayden
  First African-American woman to headline Coachella: Beyoncé, giving rise to the nickname Beychella
- First African American to play for Team USA Hockey in the Olympic Games: Jordan Greenway
- First African-American artist commissioned for U.S. president portrait to be displayed in the Smithsonian: Kehinde Wiley
- First African-American artist commissioned for U.S. first lady portrait to be displayed in the Smithsonian: Amy Sherald
- First African-American elected to a state office of the Maryland Society Daughters of the American Revolution: Reisha Raney
- First African American to be the artistic or creative director of a French fashion house: Virgil Abloh
- First African-American president of the American Psychiatric Association: Altha Stewart
- First African-American woman to be major party nominee for state governor: Stacey Abrams
- First African-American superintendent of the United States Military Academy: Darryl A. Williams
- First African-American woman U.S. Marine Corps general officer: Lorna Mahlock
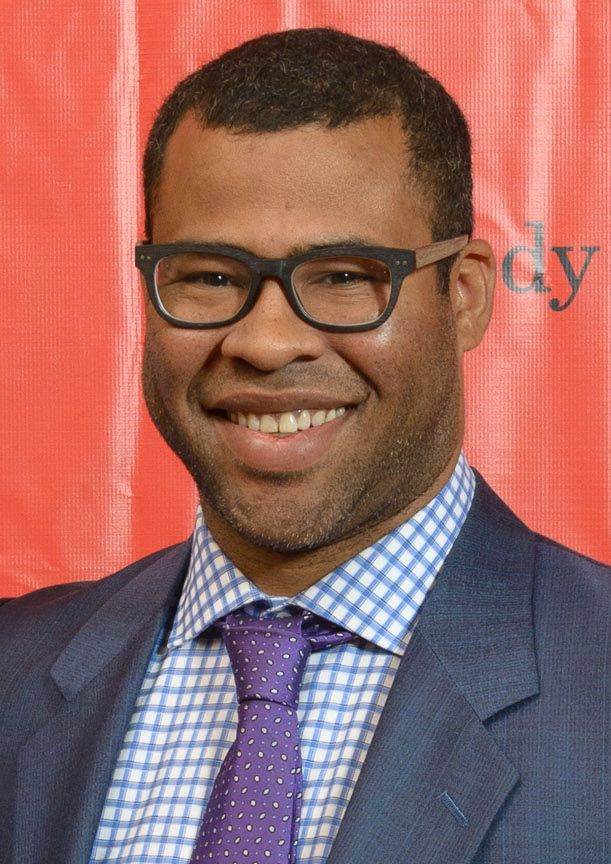
- Jordan Peele
  First African-American winner of the Academy Award for Screenwriting: Jordan Peele
- First African-American winner of the Academy Award for Best Animated Short Film: Kobe Bryant
- First African-American woman nominated for the Academy Award for Best Adapted Screenplay: Dee Rees
- First African-American woman to serve as president of the American Psychological Association (APA): Jessica Henderson Daniel
- First African American to serve as a Chief Judge for the United States District Court for the Eastern District of Louisiana: Nannette Jolivette Brown

2019

- First African-American woman to be the director of the Illinois Department of Public Health: Dr. Ngozi Ezike
- First African-American general authority of the Church of Jesus Christ of Latter-day Saints: Peter M. Johnson
- First African-American (and first historian) secretary of the Smithsonian Institution: Lonnie Bunch
- First African-American female director of an Association of Zoos and Aquariums-accredited institution: Denise Verret
- First African-American elected official to lie in state at the U.S. Capitol: Representative Elijah Cummings (See also: 1998, 2005)
- First African-American elected to the National Board of Management of the Daughters of the American Revolution: Wilhelmena Rhodes Kelly
- First African-American woman to win the Academy Award for Best Costume Design: Ruth E. Carter
- First African American to be nominated for and win an Academy Award for Best Animated Feature: Peter Ramsey
- First African American to be nominated for and win an Academy Award for Best Production Design: Hannah Beachler
- First African-American woman to serve as floor director: Shuwanza Goff
- First African American woman to be awarded a Michelin star: Mariya Russell
- First African-American woman to serve as a United States district judge of the U.S. District Court for the Northern District of Texas: Ada Brown

=== 2020s ===
2020

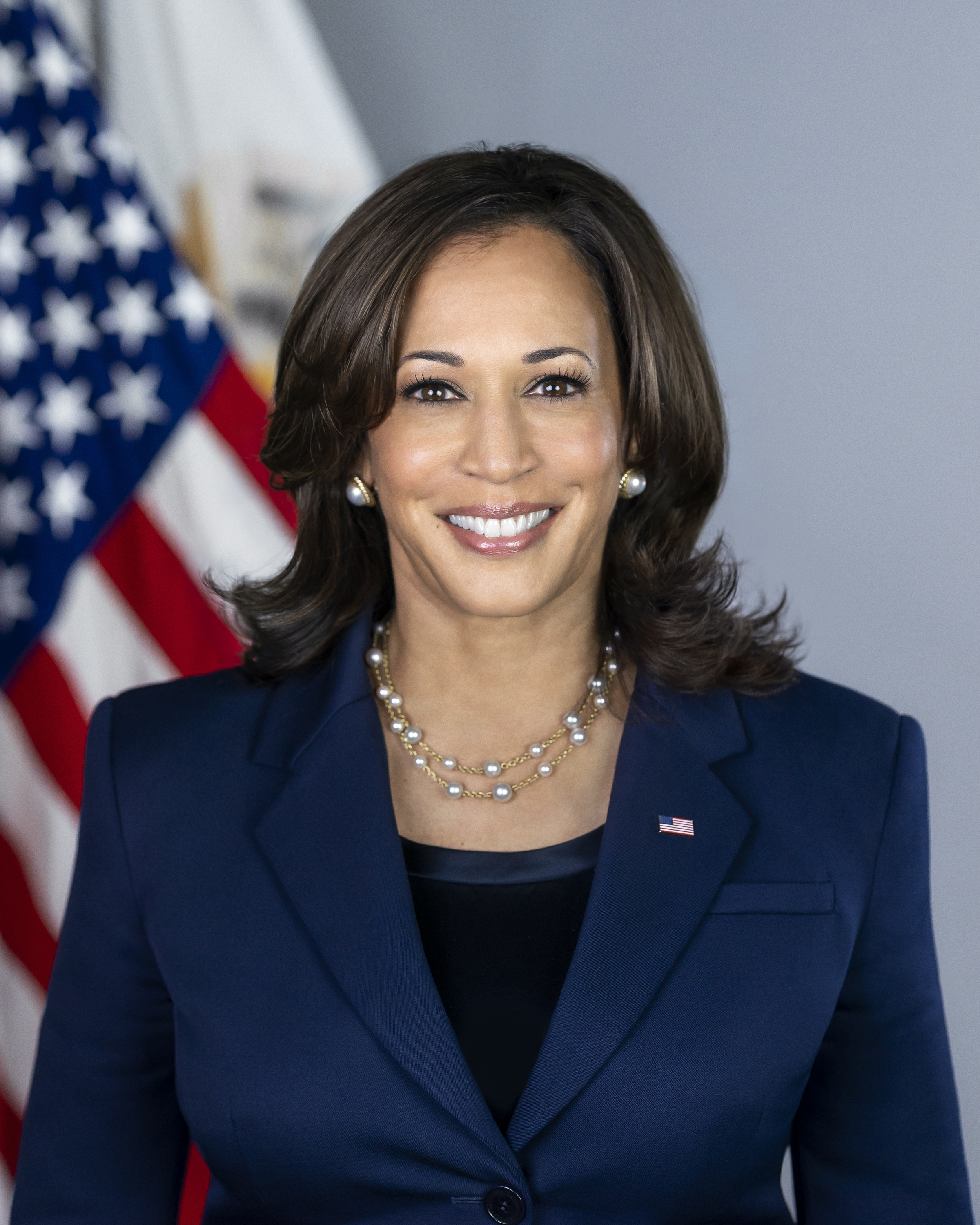
Official portrait of Kamala Harris, 2021

- First African-American (and Asian-American) to be nominated as a major party U.S. vice-presidential candidate: Kamala Harris, Democratic Party (See also: 2003, 2021, and 2024)
- First African-American (and Asian-American) elected Vice President of the United States: Kamala Harris
- First African American to be appointed as a military Chief of Staff and first African American to lead any branch of the United States Armed Forces: Charles Q. Brown Jr.
- First African-American woman elected to the Raleigh City Council: Stormie Forte
- First African-American president of an NFL team: Jason Wright (Washington Commanders)
- First African-American Professor of Poetry, first African-American woman Professor and first Distinguished Visiting Poetry Professor of the Iowa Writers' Workshop: Tracie Morris
- First African-American elected official to lie in state at the U.S. Capitol Rotunda: John Lewis (See also: 1998, 2005)

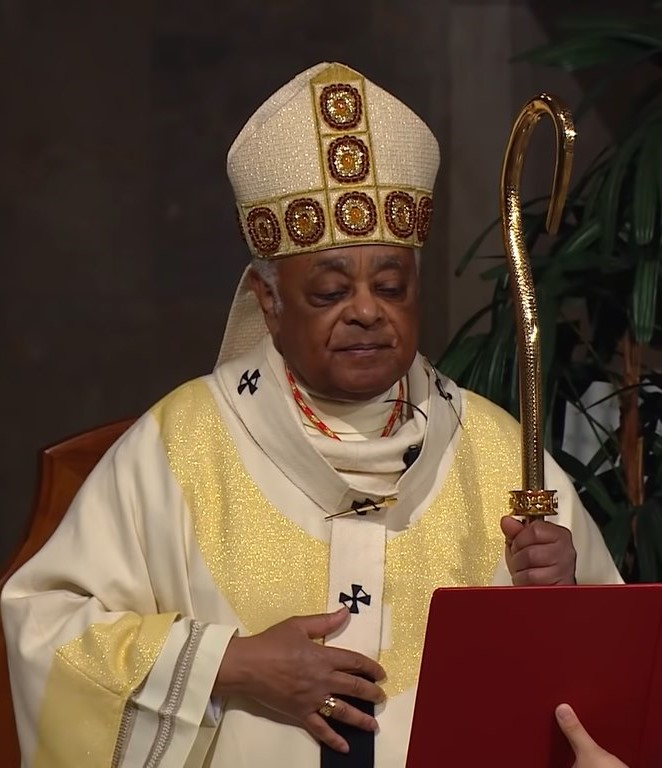
Cardinal Wilton Gregory

- First African-American Catholic cardinal: Wilton Gregory (see also: 2001)
- First African-American recording artist to have three albums certified diamond in the United States: Whitney Houston

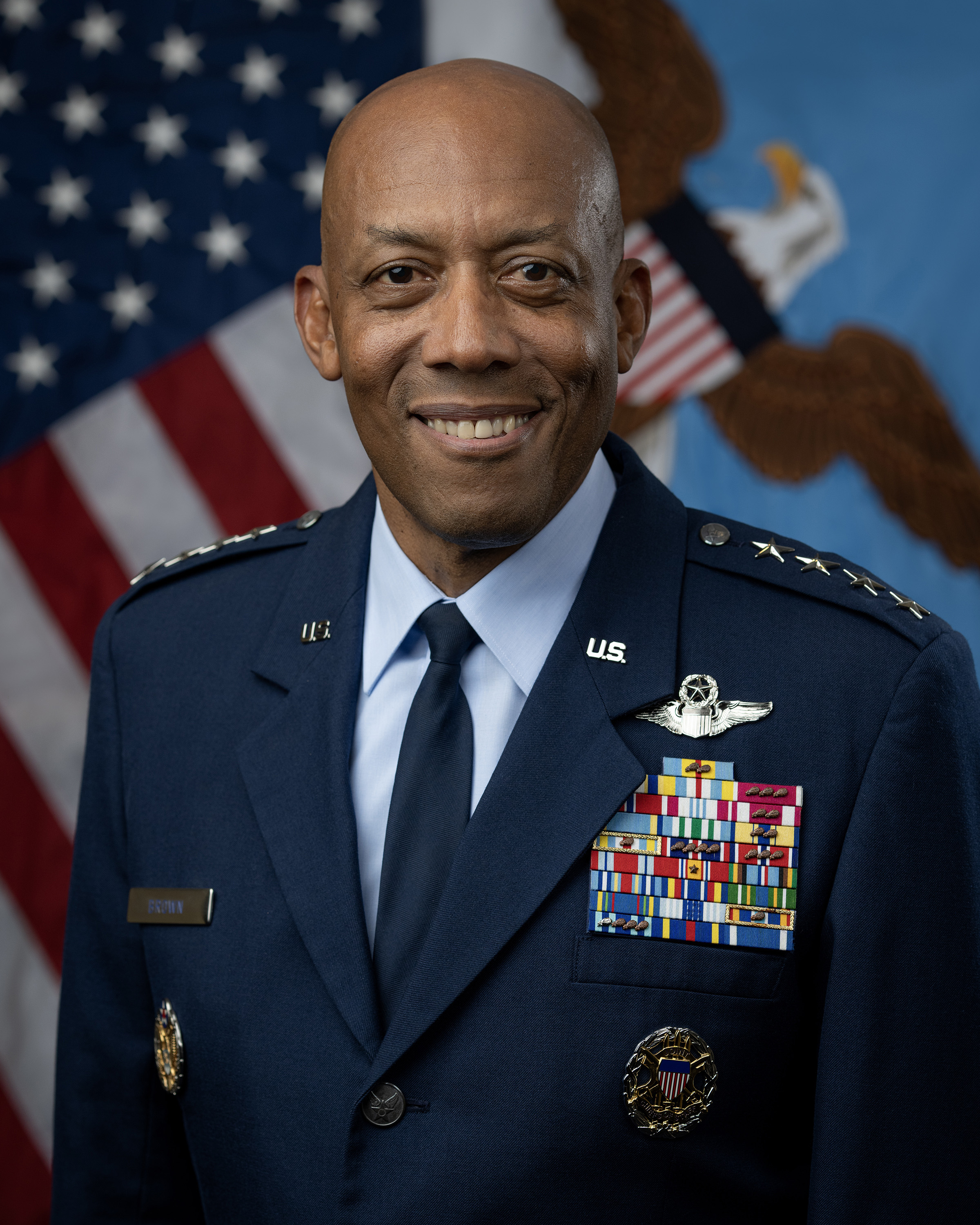
General Charles Q. Brown Jr.

- Remoshay Nelson became the first Black female officer to join the United States Air Force Thunderbirds.
- First African-American woman to lead the American Library Association (ALA): Tracie D. Hall
- First African American to serve on a long-duration mission to the International Space Station (ISS): Victor Glover
- First African-American woman U.S. Naval tactical jet pilot: Madeline Swegle

2021

- First African-American (and Asian-American) Vice President of the United States: Kamala Harris (See also: 2003, 2020, and 2024)
- First African-American Democratic U.S. senator to represent a former Confederate state in the United States Senate: Raphael Warnock, elected in Georgia.
- First African-American United States Secretary of Defense: Lloyd Austin
- First full-time female African-American NFL coach: Jennifer King (Washington Commanders).
- First African-American president of the American Civil Liberties Union: Deborah Archer
- First African-American woman to serve on the Supreme Court of Missouri: Robin Ransom

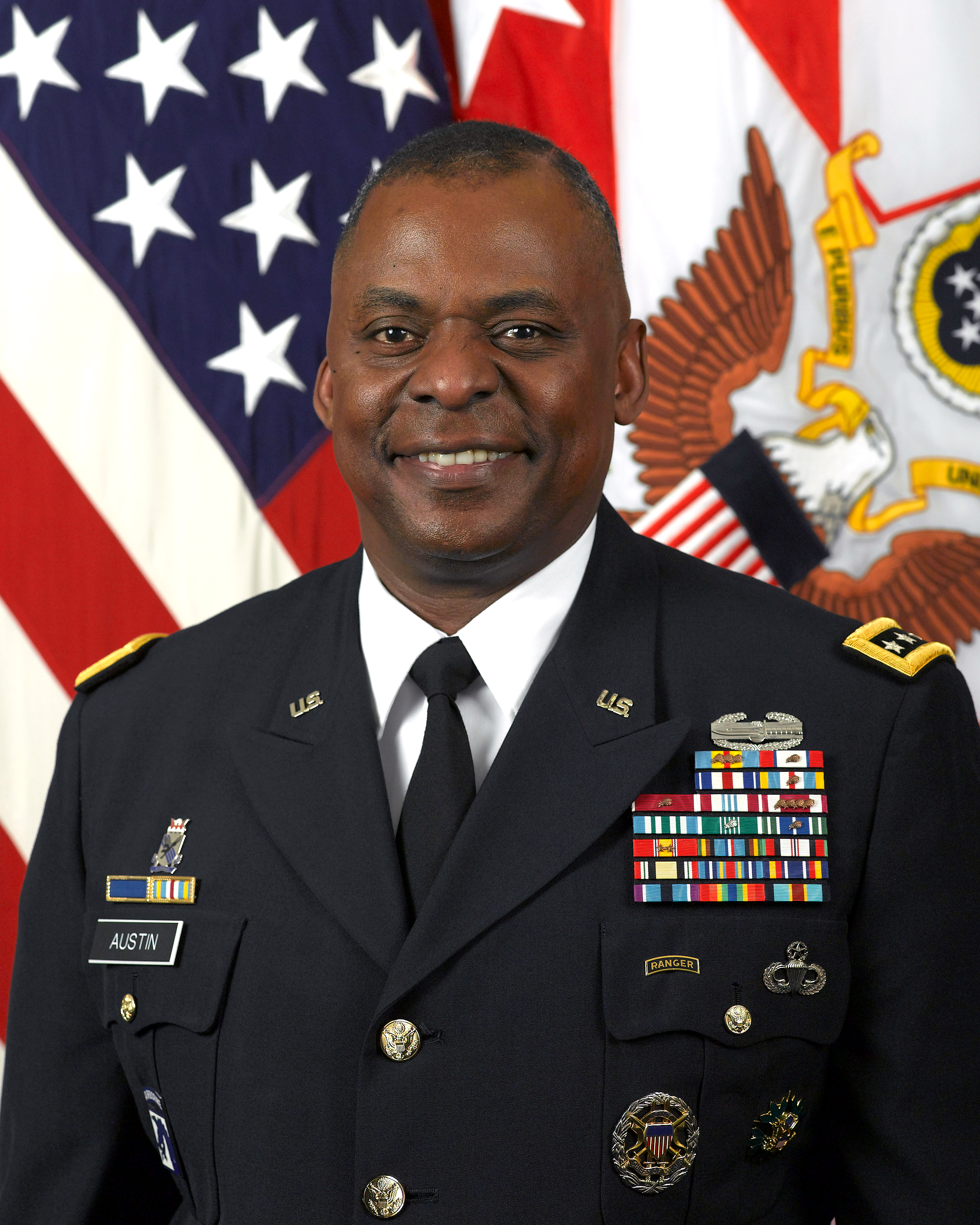
General Lloyd Austin

- First African-American woman to be named "Sexiest Woman Alive" by Maxim magazine: Teyana Taylor
- First African American to win the Scripps National Spelling Bee: Zaila Avant-garde
- First African-American U.S. Attorney for the Southern District of New York: Damian Williams
- First African-American NCAA ice hockey coach: Kelsey Koelzer
- First African-American Connecticut State Comptroller: Natalie Braswell
- First African-American woman to be elected as Lieutenant Governor of Virginia: Winsome Sears
- First African-American to be elected as Lieutenant Governor of North Carolina: Mark Robinson
- First African-American to serve as Second Lady of North Carolina: Yolanda Hill Robinson
- First African-American woman to serve as Brigade Commander at the United States Naval Academy: Sydney Barber
- First African American to Chair the Council of Economic Advisers: Cecilia Rouse
- First African American elected to the United States Congress from the state of Washington
- First African Americans to win the Academy Award for Best Makeup and Hairstyling: Jamika Wilson and Mia Neal
- First African-American woman to serve as the Principal Deputy Spokeswoman for the United States Department of State: Jalina Porter
- First African-American woman to pilot a spacecraft and the first African-American commercial astronaut: Sian Proctor
- First African-American woman to be Deputy Secretary of Agriculture: Jewel H. Bronaugh
- First African-American woman coach in Major League Baseball (MLB): Bianca Smith
- First African American United States Forest Service chief: Randy Moore
- First African American United States Army Reserve lieutenant general: A. C. Roper
- First African American woman to serve as chief judge for the United States District Court for the Northern District of Mississippi: Debra M. Brown
- First African-American woman on a professional road cycling team (Liv Racing Women’s WorldTour Team): Ayesha McGowan
- First African-American woman confirmed as the United States Attorney for the District of Massachusetts: Rachael Rollins
- First African-American woman to serve as the United States Attorney for the Western District of New York: Trini E. Ross
- First African-American woman to serve as the United States Attorney for the Eastern District of Michigan: Dawn N. Ison
- First African-American woman president of the International Political Science Association: Dianne Pinderhughes
- First person of color to serve as Chief Judge of the United States District Court for the Southern District of Indiana: Tanya Walton Pratt
- First woman of color to serve as district judge for the United States District Court for the District of Maryland: Lydia Griggsby
- First woman and first African-American woman to serve as the assistant attorney general for the Civil Rights Division at the United States Department of Justice: Kristen Clarke

2022

- First Afro-Caribbean American woman elected Speaker of the New York City Council: Adrienne Adams
- First African-American woman and first woman to be the police commissioner of the New York Police Department: Keechant Sewell
- First African-American woman to appear on U.S. currency (a quarter): Maya Angelou
- First African-American woman nominated, confirmed to, and sworn into the Supreme Court of the United States: Ketanji Brown Jackson
- First African-American represented in the National Statuary Hall Collection: Mary McLeod Bethune
- First African-American Marine Corps four-star general: Michael Langley
- First African-American elected governor of the U.S. state of Maryland: Wes Moore
- First African-American elected Attorney General of the U.S. state of Maryland: Anthony Brown
- First African-American chosen to lead a party caucus in either chamber of Congress: Hakeem Jeffries (D-NY)
- First African-American female Major general in the U.S. Marine Corps: Lorna Mahlock
- First African-American woman to join the Arkansas Society of the Daughters of the American Revolution: Sharon Fort
- First African-American transgender woman model for Victoria's Secret: Emira D'Spain
- First African-American woman elected mayor of Los Angeles: Karen Bass
- First African-American woman to win 32 Grammy Awards: Beyoncé
- First African-American woman and first woman of color to lead any of the 12 regional Federal Reserve Banks: Susan M. Collins
- First African-American woman appointed CEO and President of the Sinai Chicago hospital system: Ngozi Ezike
- First African-American woman and first woman of color to sit on the Federal Reserve Board of Governors: Lisa D. Cook
- First Black person to dive to Challenger Deep, the deepest point on Earth, and to successfully operate a side scan sonar at full-ocean depth: Dawn Wright
- First African American and first woman of color to lead the White House Office of Science and Technology Policy (OSTP): Alondra Nelson
- First African American, and first woman to serve as executive director and chief executive officer of the American College of Surgeons: Patricia L. Turner
- First African-American woman to earn FIFA international refereeing badge: Natalie Simon
- First African-American woman mathematician to have her papers archived in the Library of Congress: Gloria Ford Gilmer
- Second African-American woman to serve on the United States Court of Appeals for the Ninth Circuit after Johnnie B. Rawlinson: Holly A. Thomas
- First African-American woman to serve on the United States Court of Appeals for the Fifth Circuit: Dana Douglas
- First African-American woman to serve on the United States Court of Appeals for the Third Circuit: Arianna J. Freeman
- First African-American general manager in the National Hockey League (NHL) (San Jose Sharks): Mike Grier
- First African-American woman National Football League (NFL) referee: Maia Chaka
- First African-American woman to win a Winter Olympic gold medal in an individual sport (Women's 500m speed skating event at the 2022 Beijing Winter Olympics): Erin Jackson
- First African-American woman to medal in singles in the ISU Grand Prix of Figure Skating that began in 1995: Starr Andrews
- First African-American woman to represent the United States at the Venice Biennale: Simone Leigh
- First African-American woman to serve as U.S. Attorney for the United States District Court for the District of Connecticut: Vanessa R. Avery
- First African-American woman to serve as U.S. Attorney for the United States District Court for the District of Massachusetts: Rachael Rollins

2023

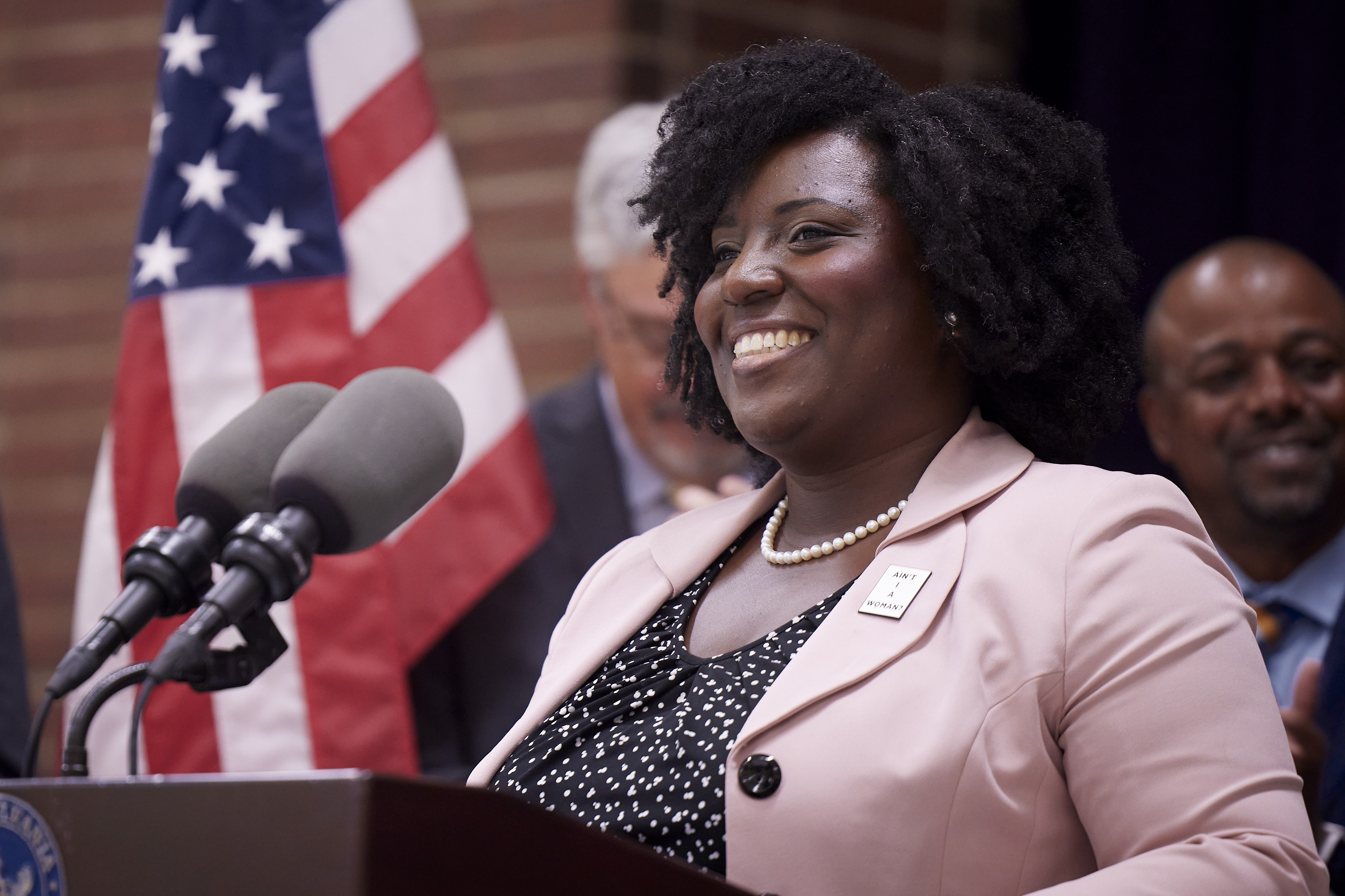
Joanna McClinton

- First African-American woman elected Speaker of the Pennsylvania House of Representatives: Joanna McClinton
- First African-American woman to win two Academy Awards in any category (Best Costume Design): Ruth E. Carter
- First openly LGBT African American to serve in the United States Senate: Laphonza Butler
- First African American elected as the president of the American Academy of Dermatology: Susan C. Taylor
- First African-American woman to be awarded the Berggruen Prize, a $1 Million Prize by the Berggruen Institute awarded annually to a thinker shaping political, economic, and social institutions: Patricia Hill Collins
- First African-American woman to serve on the United States Court of Appeals for the Eleventh Circuit: Nancy Abudu
- First African-American woman to serve on the United States District Court for the District of Oregon: Adrienne Nelson
- First African American to serve as a United States Attorney on the United States District Court for the Eastern District of Texas: Damien Diggs
- First African American and first African-American woman magistrate judge for the United States District Court for the District of New Hampshire: Talesha Saint-Marc

2024

- First African American woman and (Asian-American) to be nominated as a major party U.S. presidential candidate: Kamala Harris, Democratic Party
- First African-American descendant of Colonel John Hazzard Carson admitted to the Daughters of the American Revolution and first African-American member of the NSDAR Greenlee Chapter: Regina Lynch-Hudson
- First African-American woman elected to the U.S. Senate in the state of Maryland: Angela Alsobrooks
- First African-American women to achieve the rank of National Master after surpassing a United States Chess Federation (USCF) rating of 2200: Shama Yisrael in July 2024 and Jessica Hyatt in August 2024
- First African-American woman to be appointed rear admiral lower half in U.S. Coast Guard history: Zeita Merchant
- First African-American woman president of the American Institute of Architects (AIA): Kimberly Dowdell
- First African-American woman to win an individual Olympics fencing medal: Lauren Scruggs
- First Black woman judge for the United States District Court for the Eastern District of California: Dena M. Coggins
- First African-American woman to serve as federal judge for the United States District Court for the Northern District of Indiana: Cristal C. Brisco

2025

- First American with African American roots to become a Pope of the Catholic Church: Cardinal Robert Francis Prevost was elected Pope Leo XIV by the 2025 papal conclave
- First African-American to be elected Presiding Bishop of the Evangelical Lutheran Church in America: Yehiel Curry
- First African-American member of Congress known to be born legally blind in both eyes: Lateefah Simon
- First African-American woman president of the American Chemical Society (ACS): Dorothy J. Phillips
- First African-American winner of the Primetime Emmy Award for Outstanding Supporting Actor in a Drama Series: Tramell Tillman
- First African-American woman as named president and CEO of the National Low Income Housing Coalition (NLIHC): Renee M. Willis
- First African-American woman ordained as a cantor: Jenni Asher
- First African-American woman to serve as the chief judge for the United States District Court for the District of Massachusetts: Denise J. Casper
- First African-American and first African-American woman acting United States Attorney for the Middle District of Georgia: Shanelle Booker
- First African American elected president of the Mathematical Association of America (term as president-elect begins July 1, 2026; term as president begins July 1, 2027): Edray Goins
- First African-American woman acting U.S. Attorney for the United States District Court for the Southern District of Georgia: Tara M. Lyons
- First United States Congress to include two Black women senators at the same time (Angela Alsobrooks and Lisa Blunt Rochester): 119th Congress

2026

- First African-American woman to win an Olympic gold medal in ice hockey: Laila Edwards
- First African-American woman and first woman to win the Academy Award for Best Cinematography (Sinners): Autumn Durald Arkapaw
- First African American to travel beyond low Earth orbit and the first to journey to the vicinity of the Moon. Also, along with the other crew members of Artemis II, one of the four humans who have traveled the farthest from Earth: Victor Glover
- First African-American woman to compete in a national ARCA Menards Series event: Dystany Spurlock
- First Black woman to command a crewed orbital spaceflight (as commander of SpaceX Crew-13, a NASA mission to the International Space Station): Jessica Watkins
- First Black woman to become CEO of Dow Inc: Karen S. Carter
- First Black woman to be elected governor of a U.S. state: Keisha Lance Bottoms (D–GA)
- First African American elected governor west of the Mississippi River (Nevada): Aaron Ford
- First African American United States senator from Mississippi since the Reconstruction era: Scott Colom (D-MS)

== See also ==
- List of African-American pioneers in desegregation of higher education
- List of African-American sports firsts
- List of African-American arts firsts
- List of African-American United States Cabinet members
- List of African-American U.S. state firsts
- List of black Academy Award winners and nominees
- List of black Golden Globe Award winners and nominees
- List of first African-American mayors
- List of African-American women in medicine
- Timeline of African-American history
- Timeline of the civil rights movement
- List of Asian-American firsts
- List of Native American firsts
