= John Henry Hale =

Medical surgeon and professor from Tennessee

- Born: June 5, 1878 (Note: Two sources incorrectly indicate that Hale's year of birth was 1885, thus implying that he received his bachelor's degree at 15. His correct date of birth is June 5, 1878.); Estill Springs, Tennessee, US
- Died: March 27, 1944 (aged 65); Hubbard Hospital, Nashville, Tennessee, US
- Burial place: Greenwood Cemetery, Nashville, Tennessee
- Education: Central Tennessee College, Meharry Medical College
- Occupations: surgeon; professor
- Years active: 1905–1944
- Employer(s): Millie E. Hale Hospital, Meharry Medical College
- Spouse(s): Millie E. Hale; Carrie (Jordan) Hale
- Awards: Distinguished Service Medal, 1944

John Henry Hale (June 5, 1878 – March 27, 1944) was a prominent surgeon, professor, and philanthropist who played a prominent role in establishing the black medical community. Hailed as the "dean of American Negro surgeons," Hale conducted over 30,000 surgeries, mainly at Meharry Medical College and Millie E. Hale Hospital. He practiced medicine and taught at Meharry for 29 years, mentoring a plethora of black surgeons.

Together with his wife, Millie, Hale did much philanthropic work in his local black community in Nashville, Tennessee. Together, they distributed food to the poor, offered much of their medical care for free, ran free medical classes and lectures, and converted their home into a local community center — a hosting place for many local community organizations.

Hale was a president of National Medical Association in 1935. He is a recipient of a Distinguished Service Medal. His name was given to medical organizations, a medical center in California, and a public housing project in Nashville.

== Early life and education ==
Hale was born June 5, 1878, in Estill Springs, Tennessee, into the family of Aaron Hale (1849–1914) and Emma (Gray) Hale (1848– ?). He received his elementary education in Estill Springs, then moved to Nashville in the 1890s. In 1901, Hale graduated from Walden University in Nashville (also known as Central Tennessee College) with a B.S. degree. For the next four years, he attended Meharry Medical College graduating as a Doctor of Medicine in 1905. During his years in Meharry, Hale attended Daniel Hale Williams' surgical clinics, which later influenced Hale's decision to specialize as a surgeon. Soon after his graduation, on December 20, 1905, Hale married his first wife, Nashvillian Millie Essie (Gibson) Hale.

== Medical career ==
After his graduation from Meharry Medical College, Hale was invited to join the college in a full-time capacity as faculty member and medical practitioner at the hospital adjoined to the college. The hospital was founded in 1900 by Robert F. Boyd as a 27-bed Mercy Hospital on South Cherry Street. In 1910, it was renamed to Hubbard Hospital and moved to First Avenue South. Hale started as instructor in histology and remained in this position from 1905 to 1911.

However, inspired by Daniel Hale Williams' surgical clinics, Hale's ambition was to become a surgeon. As relevant post-graduate schooling was not available at Meharry, Hale travelled to Mayo Clinic in Rochester, Minnesota, Crile Clinic in Cleveland, Ohio, and the University of Chicago to advance his knowledge in surgery. Hale also started practicing surgery as early as 1906, taking indigent cases in Nashville. While teaching histology, Hale briefly headed the tumor clinic at Mercy hospital in 1906 and 1907,; he then served a clinical instructor from 1911 to 1912.

Hale gradually became a "self-taught" surgeon who would take on most surgeries — a universalism occasionally practiced at that era. In 1922, Hale became the director of the Division of Surgery at Meharry; then in 1923, the chief of staff of the Department of Surgery at Hubbard Hospital; and in 1924, a clinical professor of surgery in Meharry Medical College. He advanced to full professorial position in 1931, and in 1938 became the chairman of the Department of Surgery at Hubbard Hospital. Hale is credited for performing approximately 30,000 surgeries before his death in 1944. For his "outstanding contribution to the Negro medical profession," Hale was posthumously awarded the Distinguished Service Medal. The ceremony was performed by Ulysses G. Dailey, the first black surgeon recognized by the United States medical profession.

=== Millie E. Hale Hospital ===
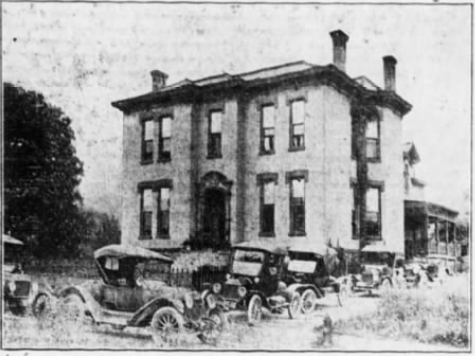
Millie E. Hale Hospital, 1917

Following the sudden death of his two-month old son, John Henry Hale Jr., in 1916, Hale and his wife, Millie E. Hale founded a new hospital to treat black community of Nashville, which numbered 35,000 at the time. His wife was the driving force and supervisor of the new institution, which was named after her, while Hale became the surgeon-in-chief. The hospital opened at 523 Seventh Avenue and grew from 12 beds in 1916 to 75 beds in 1922. The hospital successfully passed all the standards set by the state of Tennessee, getting average scores of 91%. By 1923, over 5,000 surgeries had been performed at this hospital, most by Hale.

After the premature death of his wife in 1930, Hale maintained the Millie E. Hale Hospital for eight more years. In 1938, however, Meharry management insisted that Hale could not stretch himself so broadly, and the hospital closed, its staff and patients absorbed by Hubbard Hospital.

=== Other medical work ===
Following the example of his mentor, Daniel Hale Williams, Hale conducted multiple teaching clinics all over the American South to spread his surgical knowledge and practice among fellow black doctors.

Hale was also a patron of the Tuskegee Institute, a historically black university in Alabama. He served as a president of the National Medical Association in 1935, and was active in the Meharry Alumni Association.

== Philanthropy ==
A religious Christian, Hale devoted most of his time and income to help out the black community of Nashville. He gave over 100 free lectures and clinics. He and his wife did not charge indigent patients at Millie E. Hale Hospital, performing medical procedures for free and paying for medicines out of their own pocket. The family gradually converted their family home at 419 Fourth Ave South into a community center — a meeting place of numerous organizations working to improve the lives of local people. Hales distributed free food and provided home care to the poorest people in their community.

== Personal life and death ==
Friends described Hale as a "colorful personality." He was a physically large man, often called "Big John." His friends and colleagues also noted Hale to be tempered and religious.

Hale married his first wife, Millie E. (Gibson) Hale, on December 20, 1905. They had three children: John Henry Jr. (1913–1914), Essie Margaret, and Mildred (Hale) Freeman (1908–1986). Mildred followed in her mother's footsteps, graduating from Fisk University. She was active in the black community and served on boards of the National Medical Association and Young Women's Christian Association. She promoted religion in the community, and worked as a nurse and a school teacher. She married Samuel Henry Freeman (1898–1949), Hale's student and later the first black doctor to receive master's degree in Orthopedics.

After his first wife's premature death in 1930, Hale married Carrie (Jordan) Hale (b. 1901). The couple then lived at 623 Seventh Avenue South, as Hale's first home remained a community center.

In his later years, Hale developed cardiovascular disease; however, he continued to operate, even exhibiting severe symptoms. He died on March 27, 1944, of coronary insufficiency at Hubbard Hospital, and was buried at in Greenwood Cemetery in Nashville.

== Legacy ==
Hale is credited for significant and extensive contributions to the development of African-American medicine, teaching many young physicians who "beloved and admired" him. He became "famous" and "internationally known" for his medical work. Dr. Edward L. Turner, the president of Meharry Medical College in 1944, believed that Hale "had more influence than any other man in the encouragement and development of Negro surgeons." Hale's student, Matthew Walker Sr., who succeeded Hale at his post at Meharry, remembered Hale as "a brilliant teacher." His two other students remembered him as a professor who "captivated the student body."

Meharry colleagues eulogized Hale as the "dean of American Negro surgeons." A mural and a portrait of Hale was installed in Meharry Medical College in 1951 As of 2018, Hale was inducted into the Tennessee Healthcare Hall of Fame.

A 500-dwelling public housing project on Charlotte Avenue in Nashville was named after Hale, and as of 2013, served as a nationwide example of a successful HOPE VI development, a housing project with mixed-income integration.

The California chapter of the National Medical Association was named the John Hale Medical Society. At the time of its construction in 1969, a medical center at the corner of Fresno Street and Irwin Avenue in Fresno, California, was named the John Henry Hale Medical Center.

== See also ==
- Millie E. Hale Hospital
- African Americans in Tennessee
- Robert F. Boyd

== Literature cited ==
- "Death notices", Tennessean, Nashville: Tennessean Publishing Co., p. 7, January 26, 1914, LCCN sn84024774, OCLC 11232458
- "Southern States", Modern Hospital, vol. 11, no. 3, Chicago: Modern Hospital Publishing Co., pp. 50, 52, September 1, 1918, ISSN 0026-783X, OCLC 930480
- "Hospital incorporated", Tennessean, Nashville: Tennessean Publishing Co., p. 9, March 16, 1920, LCCN sn84024774, OCLC 11232458
- "Millie E. Hale called by death", Nashville Banner, Nashville: The Banner, p. 1, June 7, 1930, LCCN sn83045323, OCLC 9426483
- "Death Notices", Nashville Banner, Nashville: The Banner, p. 11, June 8, 1930, LCCN sn83045323, OCLC 9426483
- "Clinic for negroes to be held at Union", Greenville News, Greenville: Greenville News Co., p. 6, January 14, 1935, LCCN sn85042900, OCLC 12959349
- "Dr. John H. Hale, negro surgeon, dies", Tennessean, Nashville: Tennessean Publishing Co., p. 14, March 28, 1944, LCCN sn84024774, OCLC 11232458
- "Dr., Mrs. S. H. Freeman present daughter to society in magnificent Nashville debut", New Pittsburgh Courier, Pittsburgh: New Pittsburgh Courier Pub. Co., p. 10, February 10, 1945, LCCN sn83045181, OCLC 7191537
- "Dr. Freeman's services to be held Monday", Nashville Banner, Nashville: The Banner, p. 20, March 25, 1949, LCCN sn83045323, OCLC 9426483
- "Five portraits to be unveiled at Meharry", Nashville Banner, Nashville: The Banner, p. 3, June 2, 1951, LCCN sn83045323, OCLC 9426483
- "A happy home-time for love, fun", Tennessean, Nashville: Tennessean Publishing Co., p. 5, April 3, 1952, LCCN sn84024774, OCLC 11232458
- "Former Meharry doctors honored", Nashville Banner, Nashville: The Banner, p. 12, August 13, 1954, LCCN sn83045323, OCLC 9426483
- "Groundbreaking is set for West Fresno Medical Unit", Fresno Bee The Republican, Fresno: McClatchy Company, p. 37, January 26, 1969, OCLC 43596207
- "Hyde, doctors 'break ice' for new medical center", Fresno Bee The Republican, Fresno: McClatchy Company, p. 39, January 29, 1969, OCLC 43596207
- De Varenne, Maria, ed. (July 15, 2018), "Don't miss the Fourth Annual induction honoring these health care legends", Tennessean, Nashville: Tennessean Publishing Co., pp. 9A, ISSN 1053-6590, LCCN sn87073047, OCLC 6431386
- Bernard, Louis J. (1987), "The Meharry Story: Boyd, McMillan, Hale, and Walker", in Organ, Claude H.; Kosiba, Margaret M. (eds.), A Century of black surgeons: the U.S.A. experience, vol. 1, Norman: Transcript Press, pp. 103–147, ISBN 0961738006, LCCN 87402112, OCLC 15607449
- Casey, Albert Eugene (June 15, 1963), Biographical encyclopedia of pathologists: Southern United States of America, Birmingham: Amite and Knocknagree Historical Fund, LCCN 63025809, OCLC 4680354
- Cobb, William Montague (January 1, 1954), "Medical History", Journal of the National Medical Association, vol. 46, no. 1, Washington: National Medical Association, pp. 79–80, ISSN 0027-9684, LCCN 86650108, OCLC 1084379305
- Flake, Tom (October 30, 1954), "Federal public housing commissioner to speak", Nashville Banner, Nashville: The Banner, p. 3, LCCN sn83045323, OCLC 9426483
- Fraser, James C.; Chaskin, Robert J.; Bazuin, Joshua Theodore (2013), "Making Mixed-Income Neighborhoods Work for Low-Income Households", Cityscape, 15 (2), Washington: United States Department of Housing and Urban Development: 83–100, ISSN 1936-007X, JSTOR 41959112, LCCN 95643921, OCLC 31908039
- Hansen, Axel C. (January 1, 1962), "George W. Hubbard Hospital, 1910-1961", Journal of the National Medical Association, 54 (1), Washington: National Medical Association: 1–12, LCCN 86650108, OCLC 1084379305, PMC 2642110, PMID 13904402
- Kenney, John A. (July 1, 1944), Kenney, John A. (ed.), "In Memorium: Dr. John Henry Hale", Journal of the National Medical Association, vol. XXXVI, no. 4, Washington: National Medical Association, pp. 130–131, ISSN 0027-9684, LCCN 86650108, OCLC 1084379305
- Midnight, J. O. (January 6, 1922), "Nashville Race hospital looks after its own", Kansas City Advocate, Kansas City: Thomas Kennedy, pp. 1, 3, ISSN 2576-0300, OCLC 13020950
- Morton, M. B. (March 18, 1934), "Nashville Negroes have made great progress", Nashville Banner, Nashville: The Banner, p. 10, LCCN sn83045323, OCLC 9426483
- Organ, Claude H.; Williams, Betty Jean (1987), "Surgical leaders and role models", in Organ, Claude H.; Kosiba, Margaret M. (eds.), A Century of black surgeons: the U.S.A. experience, vol. 2, Norman: Transcript Press, pp. 611–639, ISBN 0961738006, LCCN 87402112, OCLC 15607449
- Ragland, John Marshall (December 1, 1923), Johnson, Charles S. (ed.), "A Hospital for Negroes with a Social Service Program", Opportunity: A Journal of Negro Life, vol. 1, no. 12, New York: National Urban League, pp. 370–371, LCCN a40001489, OCLC 173760071
- Smith, Jessie Carney (1992), "Millie E. Hale", in Smith, Jessie Carney (ed.), Notable Black American Women, Detroit: Gale Research, pp. 435–437, ISBN 0810347490, LCCN 91035074, OCLC 38560411
- Zepp, George (May 21, 2003), Sutherland, Frank (ed.), "Hale Hospital nurtured thousands of city's blacks", Tennessean, Nashville: Tennessean Publishing Co., p. 22, ISSN 1053-6590, LCCN sn87073047, OCLC 6431386
