= Carolyn Barley Britton =

African-American woman neurologist

- Born: September 13, 1944 (age 81); Alabama
- Education: Oberlin College; New York University Grossman School of Medicine
- Known for: 1st neurologist president of the National Medical Association
- Awards: W. Montague Cobb Lifetime Achievement Award from the National Medical Association; Teacher of the Year, Columbia College of Physicians and Surgeons; Distinguished Service Award, Nassau University
- Scientific career
- Fields: Neurology, Neuroinfectious disease, HIV

Carolyn Barley Britton (born 13 September 1944) is an African-American medical doctor known for her national health care advocacy and work in neurological complications of HIV and infectious diseases. She is a full professor at Columbia University College of Physicians and Surgeons. She was the 9th female president and the 1st neurologist president of the National Medical Association.

== Early life and education ==
Britton grew up in Huntsville, Alabama. She did her undergraduate study at Oberlin College, then went to New York University Grossman School of Medicine, graduating in 1975. She did her internship at Harlem Hospital in New York, and then completed neurology residency at Columbia College of Physicians and Surgeons, where she also completed a research fellowship in neuroinfectious disease.

== Career ==
Britton took a position at Columbia College of Physicians and Surgeons. In the 1980s, during the early days of the HIV epidemic, Britton studied the effects of HIV infection and AIDS on the nervous system, publishing on neurological complications in 1984, and considered a national expert by 1985. She continued to work with these vulnerable patients, published on HIV-related neuropathy and neurological infections secondary to immunocompromise, and arguing for universal counseling and voluntary testing of women for HIV.

Britton also publishes on neurological complications of Lyme disease, and on progressive multifocal leukoencephalopathy, an infectious process that occurs in the setting of immunodeficiency.

=== Presidency of the National Medical Association ===
Britton was active for many years in the National Medical Association (NMA) and took on the role of president of the NMA in 2008, at the 106th Annual NMA Convention and Scientific Assembly in Atlanta. She was the 9th female and the 1st neurologist president of the organization. As president, she worked towards universal access to health care and the elimination of racial disparities in research.

== Neurologist for Mike Tyson ==
In 1988, boxer Mike Tyson injured his head in an automobile accident. Britton cared for him at that time, and due to ongoing symptoms after his concussion, recommended he avoid sparring for 30–60 days.

== Honors, societies, and awards ==
- President, National Medical Association
- W. Montague Cobb Lifetime Achievement Award from the National Medical Association, 2019
- Inaugural Chair of the Scientific Section on Neurological Disorders in Women, American Academy of Neurology
- Interviewed at the American Academy of Neurology in 2024 as a Black Pioneer in Neurology
- Interviewed by Terrell D. Frazier for the Obama Presidency Oral History project https://obamaoralhistory.columbia.edu/interviews/c-920?topic=native-america
- Member of the Clinical Applications, Prevention and Treatment Subcommittee of the AIDS Research Committee, National Institute of Allergy and Infectious Diseases
- American Legacy Magazine's Multicultural Health Award, 2007
- Distinguished Service Awards from Manhattan Central Medical Society, Empire State Medical Association, Nassau University and Region I NMA
