= A. Porter Davis =

American physician

Albert Porter Davis (November 13, 1890–September 1, 1976) was a pioneering African-American physician and pilot. He practiced medicine in Kansas City, Kansas, where he served in multiple county-level positions and on the staff of local hospitals. In 1953, he became president of the National Medical Association. He received a pilot's license in 1928, making him one of the first licensed African-American pilots in the nation, and played an important role in the development of African-American aviation nationally.

== Early life and medical career ==
Davis was born on November 13, 1890, in Palestine, Texas to Louisa Craven and William W. Davis. He received his medical education at the historically black Meharry Medical College in Nashville, Tennessee. Upon graduating in 1913, he moved to Kansas City, Kansas to begin his practice; he also continued his education at Sumner Junior College and the University of Kansas.

Davis' first medical practice was in the Argentine neighborhood of Kansas City; as Davis spoke Spanish, he was able to grow his practice through the area's large Mexican immigrant population. He later relocated his main office to a multi-story building at 422 Minnesota Avenue in downtown Kansas City. In 1920, Davis opened the Davis Maternity Sanitarium for Unwed Mothers, which provided maternity services in complete privacy for African-American mothers; while these services were commonly available for white women at the time, few other facilities provided them for black women.

In 1926, Davis became the first black Assistant Health Director of Wyandotte County, a position he held until 1932. He served on the staff of two area hospitals, Wheatley-Provident Hospital in Kansas City, Missouri and Douglas Hospital in Kansas City, Kansas. Davis served two two-year terms as Deputy Coroner of Wyandotte County, beginning in 1940 and 1950. The National Medical Association, a national organization of African-American physicians barred from the American Medical Association due to their race, elected him president in 1953.

== Aviation and other pursuits ==
In addition to his work as a physician, Davis was a distinguished aviator. He earned his pilot's license on May 16, 1928, making him one of the first federally licensed African-American pilots. He purchased his first plane the same day, and he flew it to Chicago the next year for the first national meeting of African-American pilots; Davis was the only attendant who was not from Chicago. In 1939, Davis was awarded the Dwight H. Green Trophy for his contributions to aviation by the National Airmen's Association of America, an organization of African-American aviators. He was also named one of the association's seven vice presidents, and helped plan the following year's annual meeting in Kansas City.

Davis also pursued business interests in addition to his primary career. He founded both the Red Top taxi company and the Service Finance Corporation savings and loan agency, the first black-owned businesses of their kind in the state of Kansas, in 1927. He later became involved with real estate, redeveloping and renting several homes in his neighborhood in the 1940s and buying a mobile home park in 1953.

== Personal life ==
Davis married his wife Hazel on September 1, 1926. The couple had one daughter, A. Portia Davis.

In his early life, Davis took an interest in jazz music and performance. He wrote a piece in 1920 which was composed by James Scott, another Kansas City resident and a prominent ragtime composer. The next year, he starred in The Lure of a Woman, a black-and-white silent film which was one of the first produced by African-Americans in Kansas City.

The Davis couple completed a home in Kansas City, known as Castle Rock, in 1938. The house featured a French Eclectic design and had an extensive list of modern amenities, which were documented in an article in the Kansas City Call. They opened the house to the public upon its completion, drawing 400 visitors. The house is listed on the National Register of Historic Places.
