= Monroe Gooden =

Tennessee politician (1848-1915)

Monroe Washington Gooden
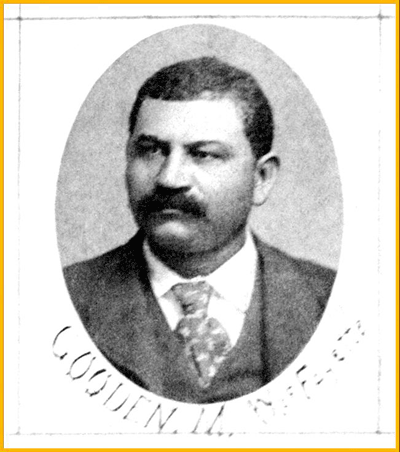

Tennessee House of Representatives
- In office 1897–1898

Personal details
- Born: May 10, 1868 Fayette County, Tennessee, U.S.
- Died: January 19, 1915 (aged 66) Fayette County, Tennessee
- Party: Democratic
- Spouse: Ann Baskerville

Military service
- Allegiance: United States
- Branch/service: United States Army
- Unit: 1st West Tennessee Infantry Regiment (African descent); 59th U.S. Colored Infantry Regiment
- Battles/wars: American Civil War

Monroe Washington Gooden (May 10, 1848 – January 19, 1915) was a politician in Tennessee. He served in the Union Army during the American Civil War. He served in the Tennessee General Assembly as a Democrat, representing Fayette County from 1887 until 1889.

== See also ==
- African Americans in Tennessee
- African American officeholders from the end of the Civil War until before 1900
