= John A. Kenney Jr. =

American dermatologist

- Born: October 8, 1914; Tuskegee, Alabama
- Died: November 29, 2003 (aged 89); Washington, D.C.
- Education: Bates College, Howard University
- Occupations: Dermatologist, medical researcher
- Known for: Research on skin disorders among racial minorities
- Relatives: John A. Kenney Sr. (father); William Oscar Armstrong (grandfather)
- Medical career
- Institutions: Howard University Hospital
- Sub-specialties: Dermatology
- Awards: American Academy of Dermatology Master of Dermatology (1995)

John Andrew Kenney Jr. (October 8, 1914 – November 29, 2003) was an American dermatologist who taught at Howard University. He specialized in the study of skin disorders affecting racial minorities. He was one of the first African-American doctors to receive formal training in dermatology, and his mentees often described him as the "dean of black dermatology".

== Early life and education ==
Kenney was born in Tuskegee, Alabama, on October 8, 1914. He was the oldest of four children of John A. Kenney Sr. and Frieda Armstrong Kenney, both of whom were also influential figures in African-American medicine. His father joined the Tuskegee Institute on the invitation of its founder, Booker T. Washington; he later became medical director and chief surgeon there. His mother graduated from Boston University, making her one of the first black women to do so; she later also took a teaching position at the Tuskegee Institute. After the family was threatened by the Ku Klux Klan, they moved to Montclair, New Jersey in 1923, where Kenney attended Montclair High School. He graduated from Bates College in 1942, where he studied chemistry and biology, and received his medical degree from Howard University in 1945. At Howard, he was a member of both Alpha Omega Alpha and Kappa Pi.

== Career ==
Kenney was an instructor in biochemistry at Howard from 1946 to 1948, and served as the assistant editor of the Journal of the National Medical Association from 1947 to 1952. In 1953, he opened a private dermatology and syphilology practice in Cleveland, Ohio. He joined the faculty of Howard University as an assistant professor in 1961, and continued to teach there for almost four decades. He served as president of the National Medical Association from 1962 to 1963, making him the only president of this association whose father had also previously been its president. By 1973, he had succeeded in creating a separate dermatology department at Howard's Freedmen's Hospital. He served as chief of the division of dermatology there for 12 years, after which he served as founding chairman of the department of dermatology for five years. He stepped down from his position of department chairman in 1980. He remained a practicing dermatologist in Washington, D.C. until 1999.

== Honors and awards ==
In 1970, Kenney became the first black member of the American Academy of Dermatology, which named him a Master of Dermatology in 1995. In 1988, he received the Dermatology Foundation's Clark W. Finnerud Award, and he received the American Academy of Dermatology's Gold Medal in 2001.

== Personal life and death ==
Kenney married Larcenia Ferne Wood in 1943; they remained married until her death in 2000. They had three children together. Kenney died of heart failure on November 29, 2003, at his home in Washington, D.C.

Kenney's obituary in The Washington Post estimated that of the about 300 black dermatologists practicing in the United States in 2003, Kenney had mentored or trained about one-third of them.
