= A. Porter Davis Residence =

Historic house in Kansas, United States

- Castle Rock
- U.S. National Register of Historic Places
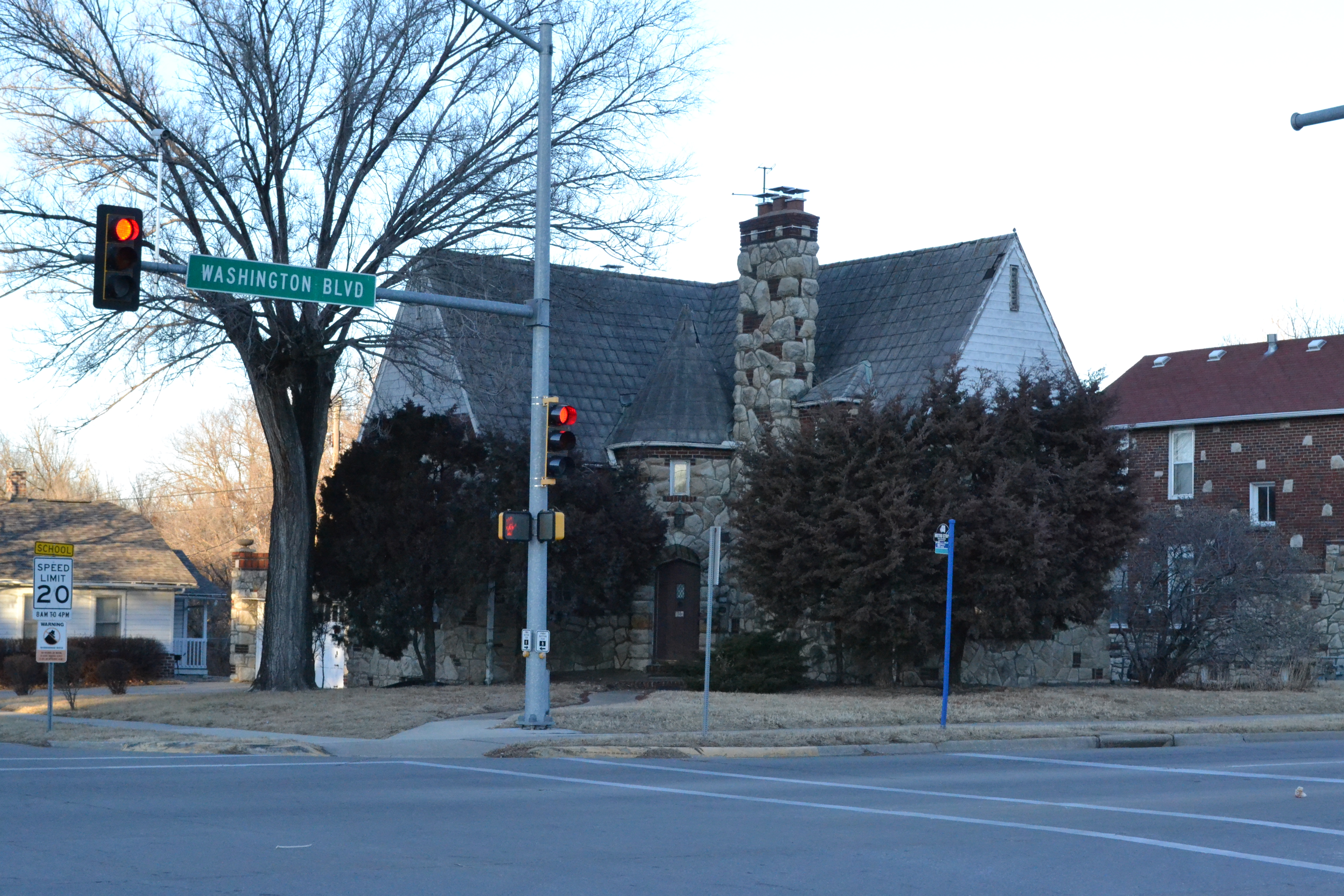

- Location within Kansas Location within the United States
- Location: Kansas City, KS
- Coordinates: 39°7′15.13″N 94°37′55.01″W
- Built: 1938
- Architect: Raymond J. Buschhusen
- Architectural style: French Eclectic
- NRHP reference No.: 00000109
- Added to NRHP: February 18, 2000

The A. Porter Davis Residence, also known as Castle Rock, is a historic house located at 852 Washington Boulevard in Kansas City, Kansas. The house was built in 1938 for Dr. A. Porter Davis, a prominent African-American physician. Davis began practicing medicine in Kansas City in 1913; as he could speak Spanish, he mainly focused on serving Mexican immigrants at first. In 1920, Davis founded a maternity hospital for unwed African-American women, a badly underserved patient population due to racial segregation. Davis later held several public health positions in Wyandotte County and became president of the National Medical Association in 1953. In addition to his medical career, Davis was one of the first African-Americans to obtain a pilot's license.

Architect Raymond J. Buschhusen designed the French Eclectic style house. The two-story house has an L-shaped plan and was built from rusticated limestone. A conical tower tops the front entrance, a key feature of the style. The second floor has several projecting wall dormers with steel casement windows.

The house was placed on the National Register of Historic Places on February 18, 2000. It is also listed on the Register of Historic Kansas Places and is a Kansas City, Kansas Historic Landmark.
