= Jesse M. H. Graham =

American politician

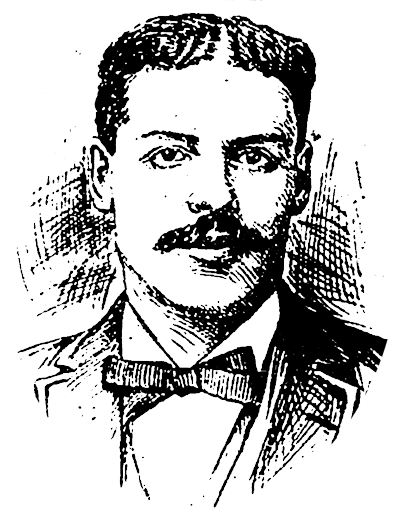

Tennessee House of Representatives
- In office 1897 – 1898 (never took office)

Personal details
- Born: Jesse Monroe Houston Graham; February 8, 1864 Nashville, Tennessee
- Died: July 25, 1930 (aged 66) Washington, D.C.
- Party: Republican

Jesse M. H. Graham (February 8, 1864 – July 25, 1930) was a teacher, newspaper editor, postal worker, and state representative in Tennessee. A Republican, he was elected to represent Montgomery County, Tennessee in 1896 and was the only African American member of the legislature at the time. He was ousted over a residency requirement (he had lived in Louisville until October 1895). A note at the Tennessee State Library and Archives states, "According to several newspaper reports, the General Assembly soon [after] passed a bill blocking the election of black candidates."

== See also ==
- African Americans in Tennessee
- African American officeholders from the end of the Civil War until before 1900
