= The Lure of a Woman =

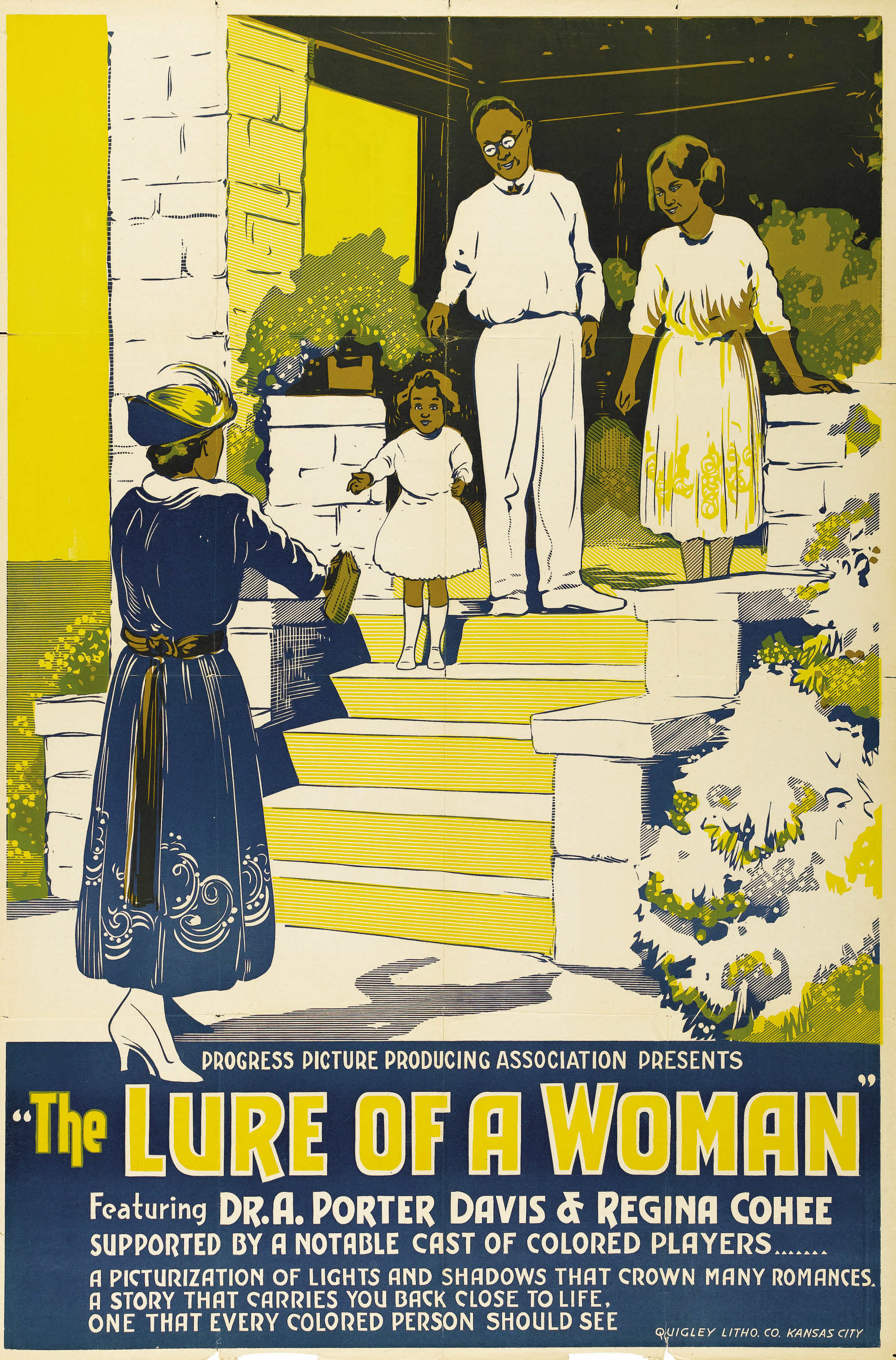
- poster
- Directed by: J. M. Simms
- Written by: J. M. Simms
- Produced by: The Afro-American Film Exhibitors Co. of Kansas City, Missouri Progress Picture Association
- Starring: A. Porter Davis; Regina Cohee
- Cinematography: Howard Curtis
- Release date: 1921
- Running time: 5-8 reels
- Country: US
- Languages: Silent; English titles

The Lure of a Woman is a lost 1921 silent film melodrama. It was directed by J. M. Simms and starred Regina Cohee, Charles H. Allen and Dr. A. Porter Davis. It was a race film and the first film shot in Kansas City.

== Cast ==
- A. Porter Davis
- Regina Cohee
- Charles Allen
- John Cobb
- Lenore Jones
- Alonzo Nixon
- Regina Taylor
