= A. W. Dumas =

American physician

Dr. A. W. Dumas
- Born: September 9, 1876; Terrebonne Parish, Louisiana, US
- Died: October 1, 1945 (aged 69)
- Known for: Co-founder of Mississippi Medical and Surgical Association
- Scientific career
- Fields: Family medicine
- Workplaces: Dumas Infirmary

A. W. Dumas (1876–1945) was an American physician and co-founder of the Mississippi Medical and Surgical Association. He also served as president of the National Medical Association.

== Biography ==
Born Albert Woods Dumas in Terrebonne Parish, Louisiana on September 9, 1876, he was the son of John Sumpter Dumas, a carpenter and sugar boiler, and his wife, Susanna. In 1899, he graduated from the Illinois College of Medicine and settled in Natchez, Mississippi. At the start of the 20th century, Dumas was one of the few African American physicians in Mississippi and established a medical practice in Natchez in the late 1890s.

In 1900, he along with Dr. L. T. Miller and several other doctors co-founded the Mississippi Medical and Surgical Association, the state's largest and oldest organization representing African American health professionals.

He started the Dumas Infirmary in Natchez to service his patients. It was one of the few private facilities at the time that would accept blacks for treatment.

In 1941, he was elected President of the National Medical Association. He died on October 1, 1945.
