= Edith Mitchell =

American oncologist and USAF officer

Brigadier general Edith Mitchell
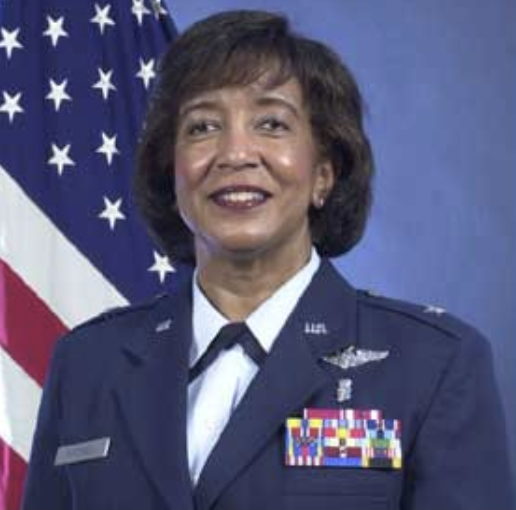
- Born: November 20, 1947; Brownsville, Tennessee
- Died: January 21, 2024 (aged 76)
- Spouse: Delmar (m. 1969)

Academic background
- Education: BSc., biochemistry, 1969, Tennessee State University; MD, VCU School of Medicine; Air War College

Edith Peterson Mitchell (November 20, 1947 – January 21, 2024) was a retired Brigadier general of the United States Air Force and an oncologist. She was clinical professor of medicine and medical oncology at Thomas Jefferson University. In 2015, she became the president of the National Medical Association.

== Early life and education ==
Mitchell was born in 1947 and raised in Brownsville, Tennessee during a time of racial segregation in the United States. Due to the racial tensions of the time, including segregated hospitals, her family lacked quality medical assistance while she was growing up. After earning her Bachelor of Science in biochemistry from Tennessee State University, she joined the United States Air Force while attending VCU School of Medicine where she was the only black female in attendance. Mitchell subsequently completed her internship and residency in internal medicine at Meharry Medical College and became a hematologist at the Andrews Air Force Base. During her university career, Mitchell became a member of Alpha Kappa Alpha.

== Career ==
Mitchell joined the faculty at the University of Missouri as an assistant professor of medicine and was the recipient of their 1991 Distinguished Service Award.

In 1993, Mitchell led a team of microbiologists to help combat a flood in Missouri and Mississippi. She also helped provide safe drinking water and administer hepatitis vaccines, resulting in her appointment to Missouri Surgeon General. She also initiated a military women's health program and participated in setting guidelines for transporting sick or wounded soldiers in military aircraft. In 2001, she became the first African-American female in the Missouri Air National Guard to be promoted to Brigadier general.

Upon retiring from the United States Air Force, she joined the faculty of medicine and medical oncology at Thomas Jefferson University and became the associate director of Diversity Programs for the Sidney Kimmel Comprehensive Cancer Center at Jefferson. There, she conducted research into pancreatic cancer which involved new drug evaluation and chemotherapy, development of new therapeutic regimens, chemoradiation strategies for combined modality therapy, and patient selection criteria. In 2009, she was the recipient of the American Cancer Society Cancer Control Award for her research in pancreatic cancer and colorectal cancer. Mitchell also received the National Medical Association Council on Concerns of Women Physicians Pfizer Research Award for her "outstanding contributions to clinical or academic medicine." The following year, she was named 'Physician of the Year' by CancerCare for her work in gastrointestinal malignancies, and the 2011 Practitioner of the Year Award from the Philadelphia County Medical Society.

In 2012, she established the Center to Eliminate Cancer Disparities within the Sidney Kimmel Cancer Center at Jefferson. That year, she also conducted a study that proved younger patients with colorectal cancer were more likely to survive than patients 50 and older. Mitchell earned the 2012 American Society of Clinical Oncology Humanitarian Award for providing patient care "through innovative means or exceptional service or leadership in the United States or abroad."

With a team of researchers in the NRG Oncology/Radiation Therapy Oncology Group (RTOG), Mitchell conducted and published clinical evidence of the merits of combined-modality treatment. In August 2015, Mitchell was appointed president of the National Medical Association for a one-year term. She was also selected by Ebony magazine as one of the most influential African Americans in the United States. During the fall, Mitchell presented advice and opinions about what Congress can do to increase African American health care, funds, and research during the legislative conference of the Congressional Black Caucus. The following year, Mitchell was selected as one of 28 cancer experts to sit on Vice President Joe Biden’s Cancer Moonshot Initiative panel and elected Vice Chair of the Cobb Board of Directors. Mitchell also created patient education videos about the screening and treatment of colorectal and breast cancers which was televised during Black History Month and later distributed to doctors’ offices across the United States.

In 2018, Mitchell received Jefferson's Achievement Award in Medicine for her contributions to science and humanity. She later became the first black woman to receive the PHL Life Sciences’ Ultimate Solution Award. Mitchell is the Editor-in-Chief of the Journal of the National Medical Association.

== Personal life ==
Mitchell and her husband Delmar had two daughters together.

Mitchell died unexpectedly on January 21, 2024. She was returning home from a gastrointestinal cancer research meeting in San Francisco, California.
