= Millie E. Hale Hospital =

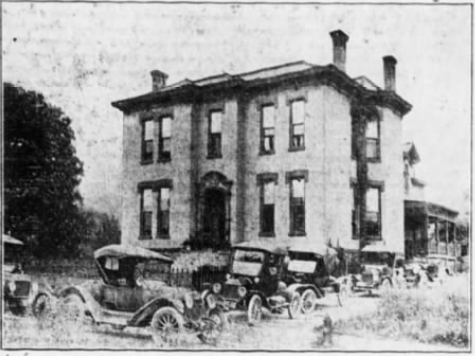
- Millie E. Hale Hospital in 1917

Geography
- Location: 523 7th Avenue, South, Nashville, Tennessee, United States
- Coordinates: 36.153449°N 86.777842°W

Organization
- Type: Specialist
- Affiliated university: Meharry Medical College
- Patron: Dr. John Henry Hale and Millie E. Hale

Services
- Beds: 75
- Speciality: African-American patients

History
- Opened: July 1916
- Closed: 1938

Links
- Lists: Hospitals in Tennessee

The Millie E. Hale Hospital was a hospital in Nashville, Tennessee that served African-American patients. It was the first hospital to serve black patients year-round. The hospital was opened by a husband and wife team, Dr. John Henry Hale and Millie E. Hale in July 1916. The couple first turned their home into a hospital that would grow to house 75 patients by 1923. In addition to the hospital, there was a community center and ladies' auxiliary that provided health services and also recreational and charity work to the black community. The hospital also provided parks for children who had no park to use in the Jim Crow era. In 1938, the hospital closed, but some social services continued afterwards.

== History ==
The Millie E. Hale Hospital was the first hospital to serve African-Americans year-round. The hospital was opened in Nashville, Tennessee in July 1916 by a husband and wife team, Dr. John Henry and Millie E. Hale. Millie Hale served as both the hospital administrator and head nurse. Her husband worked as the chief surgeon.

When the hospital first opened, it had 12 beds and two nurses. It was located on the second floor of the Hales' own home and eventually, the hospital took over the entire home. It also included a community center. By 1923, the hospital had 23 beds. Also by 1923, the hospital had seen around 7,000 patients and helped feed and provide clothing for many of these. Twenty-six nurses were employed at the hospital and the mortality rate for surgeries performed there was low. Eventually, the hospital had 75 beds and also included rooms dedicated to specializations such as a surgery room and a maternity ward. The American College of Surgeons "fully recognized" the hospital. The hospital also helped train nurses from Meharry Medical College, giving them practical experience.

The hospital's community center, which was also once a house owned by the Hales, included a free clinic and dispensary. The center also provided classes related to healthcare and childcare. In addition to providing education and practical needs, the community center screened movies and held concerts.

The ladies' auxiliary of the hospital helped provide food, clothing and companionship to the poor and the sick in the city. The auxiliary helped maintain the many social service programs provided by the hospital. The auxiliary also helped find foster homes for children. They also provided job-training programs for young women and assistance to women who were facing financial hardship.

Because there were no parks that black people could use in Nashville during the Jim Crow era, Millie Hale purchased 4 plots of land that were turned into playgrounds and recreational space. Hale staffed the parks with a director and nurse. Boys' and girls' clubs were organized.

The hospital closed in 1938 when Dr. John Henry Hale was appointed the chief of surgery at Meharry Medical College. Millie E. Hale had died in 1930. While the hospital closed, the social services the hospital had provided continued to serve the community after 1938.

== See also ==
- African Americans in Tennessee
