= Millie E. Hale =

American nurse and administrator (1881–1930)

Millie Essie Gibson Hale
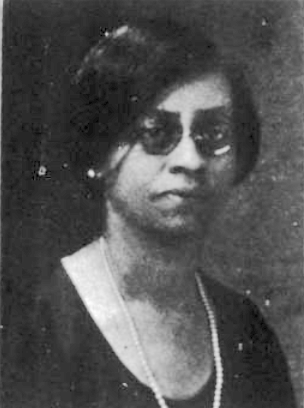
- Millie E. Hale, from a 1923 publication
- Born: February 27, 1881; Nashville, Tennessee, U.S.
- Died: June 6, 1930 (aged 49); Nashville, Tennessee, U.S.
- Resting place: Greenwood Cemetery (Nashville, Tennessee)
- Monuments: Millie E. Hale Hospital
- Education: Fisk University; Graduate School for Nurses, New York City
- Occupations: Hospital administrator, community leader
- Spouse: John Henry Hale

Millie Essie Gibson Hale (27 February 1881 – 6 June 1930) was an American nurse, hospital founder, social activist, and civic worker.

In 1916 she founded Millie E. Hale Hospital with her husband, John Henry Hale, M.D., in Nashville, Tennessee, the first year-round hospital for African Americans in the city.

== Early life and education ==
Millie Essie Gibson was born on 27 February 1881 in Nashville, Tennessee, one of five children born to Henry and Nannie Gibson. Her father was a blacksmith. In 1901, she graduated from Fisk University's Normal School, subsequently studying at New York City's Graduate School for Nurses. In 1927, she earned her bachelor's degree from Fisk.

In December 1905, Millie E. Gibson married John Henry Hale in Davidson County, Tennessee. John Henry Hale was a prominent surgeon and educator, and the couple went on to have two daughters together: Mildred and Essie.

== Career ==
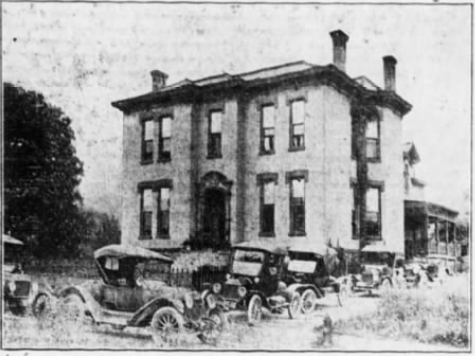
Millie E. Hale Hospital, 1917

In 1916 she and her husband founded a hospital which was the first in Nashville to treat African-American patients year round. At the time, African-Americans were denied care at other hospitals due to financial and racial discrimination. Hale served as the hospital's head nurse and administrator. In addition to these responsibilities, she created a monthly newspaper educating people on health issues, set up programs for prenatal care and nurse training, bought land for playgrounds, and eventually transformed the Hale home into a community center. The hospital was open for over two decades and closed eight years after her death in 1930. It started with only a 12-bed hospital and it grew to 75 beds and thousands of patients were treated there from all over the South.

== Death and legacy ==
Millie E. Hale died in 1930, aged 49 years, in Nashville. The Hales were inducted into the Tennessee Health Care Hall of Fame at Belmont University on October 16, 2018.
