= Thomas Wingate Todd =

Thomas Wingate Todd (January 15, 1885 – December 28, 1938) was an English orthodontist who is known for his contributions towards the growth studies of children during early 1900s. Due to his efforts, Charles Bingham Bolton Fund was established. He served as editor in chief of several journals over his lifetime.

== Life ==
He was born in Sheffield to James Todd and Katherine Todd. His father was a Wesleyan Methodist Episcopal minister. He attended Nottingham High School and then went to University of Manchester and received his Medical Degree in 1907. After graduation he continued teaching Anatomy through 1912. He served as House Surgeon at Manchester Royal Infirmary in 1909–1910. During this time, Dr. Todd published several papers on inter-relationship of skeleton and nerves. Due to his efforts a new curriculum for Diploma in Dentistry and a degree of Dental Science was created at the University of Manchester. He also worked with Dr. A.H. Young, G. Elliot Smith and Sir Arthur Keith in organizing collections of bones coming from Egypt to England by the Nubian Archaeological Survey.

Dr. Todd eventually moved to Western Reserve University and became the Professor of Anatomy and Physical Anthropology at the Western Reserve University School of Medicine. He taught anatomy to both dental and medical students at that time. During this time he published his first book, called Mammalian Dentition. His teaching was interrupted by his military service in World War I as a captain in Royal Canadian Army Medical Corps .

== Career ==
In 1920, became the Director of Hamann Museum of Comparative Anthropology and Anatomy at Cleveland Museum of Natural History . Under his direction, the museum became the largest document museum on human and mammalian growth in the world. In 1928, he started his research under the Brush Foundation where he studied 4500 healthy children. In 1929, due to his efforts Charles Bingham Bolton Fund was started.

On 20 April 1923, Todd presented a lecture to the Harvey Club of London entitled "Forecasting the Future of the White Race" in which he agreed with Julian Huxley that education and environment were less important than heredity in the development of any people. However, by the 1930s, he opposed the prevailing theories of racial determinism espoused by physical anthropologists when training William Montague Cobb, the first African-American physical anthropology PhD, who studied Jesse Owens to show that training, rather specific "racial traits," accounted for athletic success.

He was honorary member of Cleveland Dental Society, American Academy of Pediatrics, Southern Society of Orthodontists, Cleveland Neurological Society and Cleveland Allergy Society . Over his lifetime, Dr. Todd held appointments and was affiliated with sixty scientific societies of which some of them are mentioned below.

Dr. Todd married Eleanor Pearson had three children, Arthur, Donald and Eleanor.

== Awards and honors ==
- Fellow of Royal College of Surgeons of England
- Fellow of Galton Society of New York

== Positions ==
- American Association of Physical Anthropologists, president, 1938-1939
- American Association of Anatomists, vice-president, 1920-1921
- Section H American Association for the Advancement of Science, chairman, 1922-1923
- Child Development Abstracts, editor, 1932-1933
- Journal of Child Development, editor, 1930
- Growth, associate editor, 1937
- American Journal of Physical Anthropology, editor, 1918
- White House Conference on Child Health and Protection, member, 1929-1931
- Child Development of National Research Council, member, 1925-1933
