= William Oscar Armstrong =

American politician (1847–1932)

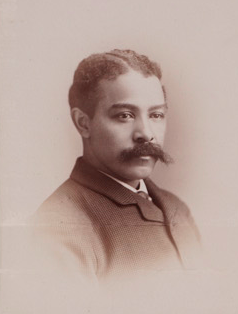

Member of the Massachusetts House of Representatives from the 9th Suffolk district
- In office 1887–1888 Serving with Henry Parkman
- Preceded by: Julius Caesar Chappelle
- Succeeded by: Frank Morison; Andrew Berkley Lattimore

Member of the Boston Common Council
- In office 1885–1886

Personal details
- Born: March 10, 1847 Oberlin, Ohio
- Died: May 22, 1932 (aged 85) Boston, Massachusetts, U.S.
- Resting place: Mount Hope Cemetery
- Party: Republican (before 1891); Prohibition Party (after 1891)
- Children: 5
- Relatives: John A. Kenney Jr. (grandson)
- Education: Oberlin College

William Oscar Armstrong (March 10, 1847 – May 22, 1932) was an American politician who was the first black candidate for statewide office in Massachusetts. He previously represented Ward 9 in the Massachusetts House of Representatives and the Boston Common Council.

== Life ==
Armstrong was born and raised in Oberlin, Ohio. After graduating from Oberlin College he performed missionary work in Haiti. Upon moving to Boston, Armstrong became active in politics in Ward 9. He was a member of the Boston Common Council from 1885 to 1886. In 1887 and 1888 he represented the 9th Suffolk district in the Massachusetts House of Representatives. In 1891 he was the Prohibition Party's nominee for Massachusetts State Auditor. He was the first black candidate for statewide office in Massachusetts. He received 11,707 votes - more than any other Prohibition candidate in Massachusetts that year. From 1893 to 1922, Armstrong was a deputy sheriff in Suffolk County, Massachusetts.

== Family ==
Armstrong had two sons (William Jr. and Theodore) and three daughters (Martha, May, and Freida). William O. Armstrong Jr. was the principal of the Dunbar School in Fairmont, West Virginia. Frieda Armstrong was the first African-American woman to graduate from Boston University. She married John A. Kenney Sr. and was the mother of John A. Kenney Jr.

== Death ==
Armstrong died on May 22, 1932, at his home in Roxbury. He was buried in Mount Hope Cemetery.

== See also ==
- African American officeholders from the end of the Civil War until before 1900
