= Dorothy Lavinia Brown =

African-American surgeon, teacher and politician

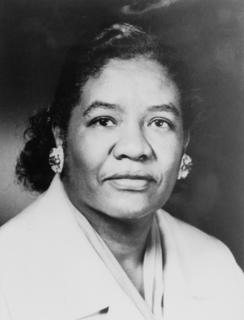
- Born: January 7, 1914; Philadelphia, Pennsylvania, U.S.
- Died: June 13, 2004 (aged 90); Nashville, Tennessee, U.S.
- Occupations: surgeon; politician; teacher
- Known for: first female African American in the Tennessee General Assembly
- Political party: Democratic

Dr. Dorothy Lavinia Brown (January 7, 1914 – June 13, 2004), also known as "Dr. D.", was an African-American surgeon, legislator, and teacher. She was the first female surgeon of African-American ancestry from the Southeastern United States. She was also the first African American female to serve in the Tennessee General Assembly as she was elected to the Tennessee House of Representatives. While serving in the House of Representatives, Brown fought for women's rights and for the rights of people of color. In 1956, Brown became the first single woman in Tennessee to be granted the right to become an adoptive parent.

== Early life and education ==
In January 1914, Brown was born in Philadelphia, Pennsylvania, and was surrendered to the Troy Orphan Asylum, an orphanage in Troy, New York at five months old by her mother, Edna Brown. Dorothy lived at the orphanage until the age of 12.

Although her mother tried to persuade Dorothy to live with her again, Brown ran away five times, returning to the Troy orphanage each time. At the age of fifteen, Brown enrolled at Troy High School. The principal at Troy High School found out that Brown was homeless, and he arranged for her to be taken in by Lola and Samuel Wesley Redmon. She worked as a mother's helper in the house of Mrs. W. F. Jarrett, in Albany, New York, which was just across the Hudson River. When she was fifteen, she worked at a self-service laundry.

After finishing high school, Brown attended Bennett College, a historically black college in Greensboro, North Carolina. She received a scholarship from the Women's Division of Christian Service of the Methodist Church. Brown earned money during this period as an inspector for the Rochester Army Ordnance Department. She graduated second in her class in 1941.

In 1944, Brown was admitted to study medicine at Meharry Medical College, a historically black college in Nashville. She completed her internship at the Harlem Hospital in New York City. After graduating in 1948 in the top third of her class, Brown became a resident at Hubbard Hospital of Meharry in 1949, despite local opposition to training female surgeons. She had gained approval from the chief surgeon, Matthew Walker, Sr., M.D. Brown completed her residency in 1954.

There were multiple factors that inspired Brown to pursue a career in surgery: the care she received during her tonsillectomy, and a performance that she watched that made her want to do something to make other African Americans proud.

== Career ==
To start off her career, Brown helped as a doctor in World War II. She worked as an inspector in the Rochester Army Ordnance Department. Brown was the chief surgeon at the now-defunct Riverside Hospital in Nashville from 1957 to 1983. In 1966, she became the first African-American female to be elected to the Tennessee General Assembly (known also as the Tennessee State Legislature), a position that she held for two years. She almost succeeded in having abortions legalized in cases of rape or incest, and in expanding the already existing legally permitted abortions in cases when the "mother's life was in danger". During her career as a politician, Brown also became involved in the passing of the Negro History Act, which required public schools in Tennessee to "conduct special programs during Negro History Week to recognize accomplishments made by African Americans".

After her work in WWII, she entered medical school at Meharry Medical College in Nashville Tennessee. Dr. Brown then did a one-year internship at Harlem Hospital and next she completed a five-year residency in general surgery at Meharry and Hubbard Hospital. In 1959, She became the first black female surgeon to become a fellow of the American College of Surgeons.

In 1968, Brown tried to obtain a seat in the Tennessee Senate, but lost in part due to her support for abortion laws. In 1968, following her departure from politics, Brown returned to becoming a full-time physician at the Riverside Hospital. Brown also acted as an attending surgeon at the George W. Hubbard and General Hospitals, as director of education for the clinical rotation program of the Riverside and Meharry Hospitals. She was also a surgery professor at the Meharry Medical College and consulted for the National Institutes of Health in the National Heart, Lung and Blood Institute. While her main focus was surgery, she was a consultant on health and welfare in National Institutes of Health.But then later became the first african american women to serve in the Tennessee state legislature.

After losing in her run for a seat in the Tennessee Senate, Brown served on the Joint Committee on Opportunities for Women in Medicine, sponsored by the American Medical Association. Along with support women in medicine, Brown also had a major influence in the fight for the rights of people of color, and was a lifelong member of the National Association for the Advancement of Colored People (NAACP).

Brown wrote an autobiography, essays, and inspirational guides.

== Recognition ==
In 1959, she became the third woman to become a Fellow of the American College of Surgeons, the first African-American woman to be elected. In 1971, the Dorothy L. Brown Women's Residence at Meharry Medical College, Nashville, was named after her. She also received honorary doctorate degrees from the Russell Sage College in Troy, New York, and also from Bennett College in Greensboro, North Carolina. In particular, she received her honorary degrees in the Humanities from Bennett College and Cumberland University.

Brown was a member of the board of trustees at Bennett College and of the Delta Sigma Theta sorority. She participated as a speaker on panels that discussed scientific, religious, medical, and political issues. Brown was also awarded the Horatio Alger Award in 1994 and the Carnegie Foundation's humanitarian award in 1993.

== Personal life ==
In 1956, Brown agreed to adopt a female child from an unmarried patient at the Riverside Hospital. The patient came to Brown while still pregnant and asked her to adopt her child. Brown agreed because she wanted a child and knew that a chance like this would most likely never come again. Brown became the first known single female in Tennessee to legally adopt a child, whom she named Lola Denise Brown in honor of her foster mother. She later adopted a son named Kevin. Brown was a member of the United Methodist Church.

== Death ==
She died in Nashville, Tennessee, in 2004 of congestive heart failure.
