= Virginia Caine =

American physician

Virginia A. Caine
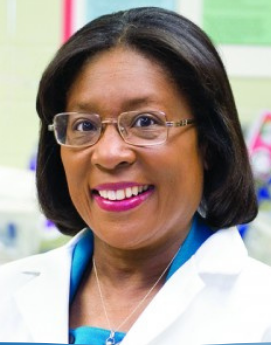
- Education: Gustavus Adolphus College, B.S. (1973), State University of New York, M.D. (1976)
- Occupation: Physician
- Employer(s): Marion County Public Health Department, Indiana; Indiana University School of Medicine

Virginia A. Caine is an American physician who is the director and chief medical officer of the Marion County Public Health Department in Indianapolis, Indiana. She is a specialist in infectious diseases and is nationally recognized for her work with AIDS and sexually transmitted diseases. She is an Associate Professor of Medicine for the Infectious Disease Division of the Indiana University School of Medicine and an Adjunct Associate Professor in the School of Public Health. She is a past president of the National Medical Association.

== Early life ==
Caine's father was a pre-med advisor at the University of Arkansas at Pine Bluff. Caine received her bachelor's degree from Gustavus Adolphus College in Minnesota, and during her time there, she spent a summer at Harvard University School of Medicine. She attended New York Upstate Medical Center in Syracuse, where she worked with King Holmes and graduated in 1976. Under Holmes, Caine learned about the Tuskegee Syphilis Study and became interested in studying and treating sexually transmitted diseases. She completed her internal medicine residency at the University of Cincinnati and received her infectious diseases fellowship training at the University of Washington in Seattle.

== Career ==
Caine served as a research epidemiologist studying HIV/AIDS at Johns Hopkins in Baltimore. In 1984, she joined Indiana University School of Medicine as an assistant professor in the Infectious Disease Division. During her time in Indianapolis, Caine created Indianapolis' first HIV/AIDS integrated health care delivery system that included major hospitals, community health centers, social service agencies, and created the first HIV dental clinic. She was also principal investigator for Ryan White Title III funds, which was used to establish the first AIDS clinics in community health centers and major city hospitals. Caine developed one of the first AIDS physician education programs for the National Medical Association, which was later duplicated by the American Medical Association.

Caine served as the co-director of the Indianapolis Healthy Babies Initiative, which together with many community leaders, has significantly reduced the infant mortality rate to 10.9 deaths per 1,000 live births in 2019.

Caine has served as chair of the Board of Trustees for the National Medical Association, and the chair of the Infectious Diseases Section of the National Medical Association. She has served as a member of the National Biodefense Science Board, which provides expert guidance to the Secretary of the U.S. Department of Health and Human Services and the assistant secretary of preparedness and is co-chair of the Jump In for Healthy Kids Advisory Committee. Caine serves as a board member for the CDC Morbidity and Mortality Weekly Report (MMWR) Editorial Board, and chair of the Managed Emergency Surge for Healthcare (MESH) Coalition, a nonprofit private-public partnership addressing emergency preparedness in Marion County, Indiana. She is a board member of the Indiana Latino Institute and a founding member of Indiana Health Information Exchange.

She is a past president of the National Medical Association.

== Awards ==
- Indiana Commission for Women Trailblazer Award, 2006
- Practitioner of the Year, National Medical Association, 2010
- August M. Watanabe Life Sciences Champion of the Year Award, 2017
- Gerald L. Bepko IUPUI Community Medallion, 2019
- Caine has received the Sagamore of the Wabash award from two Governors of Indiana
