= Kenney Memorial Hospital =

- Community Hospital
- U.S. National Register of Historic Places
- New Jersey Register of Historic Places
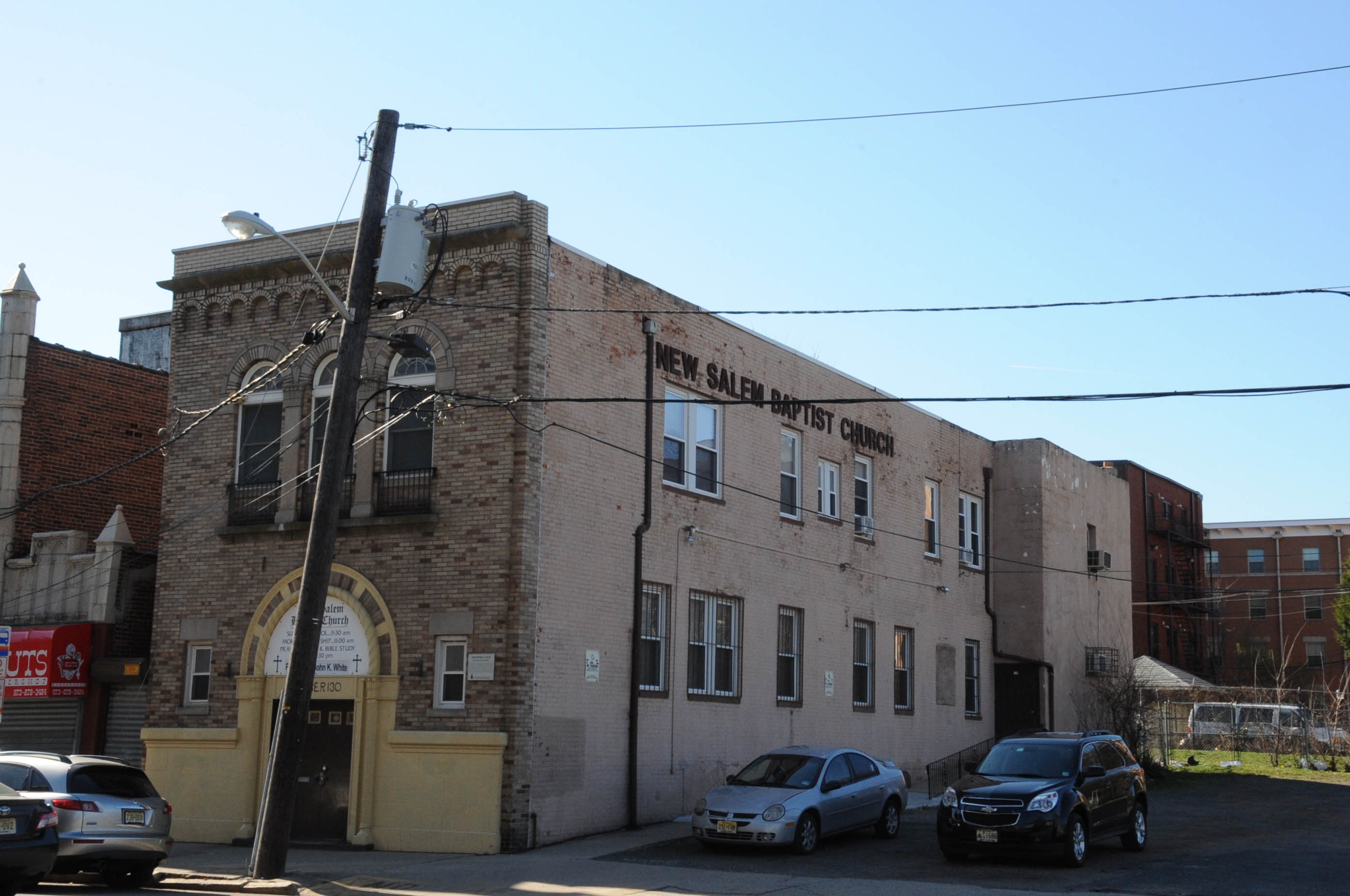
- Kenney Memorial Hospital / New Salem Baptist Church

- Location within Essex County, New Jersey Location within New Jersey Location within the United States
- Location: 130 W. Kinney Street, Newark, New Jersey
- Coordinates: 40°43′49.5″N 74°10′57.5″W
- Built: 1927
- Architectural style: Renaissance
- NRHP reference No.: 04000224
- NJRHP No.: 4236

Significant dates
- Added to NRHP: March 22, 2004
- Designated NJRHP: January 27, 2004

Kenney Memorial Hospital, located at 130 West Kinney Street in Newark, New Jersey was founded by Dr. John A. Kenney Sr. in 1927. Between 1927 and 1934, Kenney Memorial served 4,543 bed patients, 584 free clinic patients and performed 1,109 operations with only 19 deaths. The hospital was renamed the Booker T. Washington Community Hospital in 1935. It closed in 1953. The building is now the New Salem Baptist Church. The building, listed as the Community Hospital, was added to the National Register of Historic Places on March 22, 2004, for its significance in health/medicine and ethnic heritage. A museum honoring Kenney is planned for the site.

== History and description ==
The National Register of Historic Places report notes that "Kenney Memorial Hospital was the first hospital in New Jersey built exclusively to train African-American doctors and nurses, who were kept from practicing elsewhere due to racial discrimination." Kenney financed the hospital with his own money, built it next to his own house, and named it after his deceased parents. The hospital, built in Italian Renaissance Revival style, officially opened on September 1, 1927. The hospital had room for 30 patients. Hospital personnel included a house physician, eight graduate nurses, a matron, and two orderlies. "Services provided by the hospital included general medicine, surgery, gynecology, obstetrics, and physiotherapy, including radium and the x-ray." The hospital also provided a free outpatient clinic. A woman's auxiliary raised money for equipment and donations.

On Christmas Day, 1934, Dr. Kenney donated the hospital to the people of Newark. After seven years as a private hospital, the hospital became a community hospital called Community Hospital. "By Christmas 1938, Community Hospital had served 4,543 bed patients, 584 free clinic patients, and conducted 1,109 operations with only 19 deaths since its founding." In 1938, Dr. Kenney was accepted on the staff of Newark Beth Israel Hospital, and in 1939 he returned to the Tuskegee Institute. Community Hospital struggled financially through the 1940s and early 1950s. The State Department of Institutions and Agencies refused to renew its license, and the hospital's trustees closed the hospital on June 15, 1953. The hospital building was purchased by the New Salem Baptist Church.

== See also ==
- National Register of Historic Places listings in Essex County, New Jersey
