= Matthew Walker Sr. =

American surgeon (1906–1978)

Matthew Walker Sr. (December 7, 1906 – July 15, 1978) was an American physician and surgeon. He was one of the first African Americans to become a Fellow of the American College of Surgeons. He was one of the most prominent Black doctors in the 20th century in the United States.

== Early life ==
Matthew Walker's parents were Phillip Walker and Rosa Ware Walker. His grandfather's name was also Matthew Walker, but the elder's name was never included by the Walker family in the counting. The older Matthew had been an industrious man and well respected gentleman.

One town in Louisiana had been named Waterproof, since it was on higher ground than its surroundings. Phillip and Rosa Walker began their married life in Waterproof, Louisiana. The new family thought it had picked a spot safe from the floods which sometimes plagued Louisiana. However, in his early years, the child, Matthew, was to have a particularly harrowing experience related to water. Once, when a torrential rain came pouring down, the young Walker, who was standing on the rail-less porch of the family home, fell and was swept into a rush of water flowing below the porch. One of his aunts, Mattie Walker, having noted what happened, rushed to the other side of the porch, reached down, and grabbed the young child before he could be swept away in the deluge.

== Education and family life ==
The Walker family moved to New Orleans when Matthew was still young so that he could get a good education. When he became grown and married, Matthew left for his own children a recorded tape wherein he recalled memories of his father, Phillip Walker, who served as a Pullman porter during the older gentleman's rather short lifetime.

Fishing and hunting became Walker's greatest means of relaxation throughout his lifetime.

Walker's Mom, Rosa, was an expert seamstress as well as a domestic worker. Matthew would gather buttons which his Mother didn't need and sell them. Eventually, he was able to buy a radio kit with which he built a working radio for his listening pleasure.

Matthew undertook his undergraduate work at New Orleans University (later called Dillard University). Walker told his family of the times he spent working in hotels as a bus boy and such to help with his college tuition. During this time, Walker, also studied and played the violin.

While attending New Orleans University, Matthew Walker met and in 1937 married Alice Willa Gibbs Johnson. The two soon moved to Nashville where they resided in the countryside with a farming family named Beale, until they were able to buy a suitable home in Nashville proper. Four children were eventually born to them: Charlotte Rose (who became a general surgeon specializing in oncology and a professor of surgery as did her father), Maxine June (who later married Brandford Giddings Sr., PhD (chemistry)), who became a computer technologist, Matthew Jr., who became a successful and ardent community activist, and Daniel Phillip, who became a microbiologist.

Having obtained an A.B. from New Orleans University in 1929, Walker decided he wanted a medical career. He applied and was accepted at Meharry Medical College in Nashville, Tennessee, and received an M.D. degree in 1934, with honors. He became a diplomate of the American Board of Surgery about 1946, and received one of two of the highest scores out of eighty persons taking the examination at Johns Hopkins Hospital. He was elected to the Kappa Pi Honorary Society at Meharry.

== Medical career ==
After internship at Hubbard Hospital in Nashville, Dr. Matthew Walker Sr. served as a resident in surgery and gynecology at the George W. Hubbard Hospital of Meharry Medical College and was an instructor in surgery, gynecology, orthopedics, anesthesia, and areas of eye, ear, nose and throat. Walker held these positions from 1936 until 1938. Studying under Dr. Edward L. Howes at Howard University in Washington, D.C., Dr. Walker spent 1938-1939 as a General Education and Board Fellow in surgery. Additionally, Walker spent a few summers doing studies at the Mayo Clinic in Rochester, Minnesota and at the Crile Clinic in Cleveland, Ohio.

Having returned to the George W. Hubbard Hospital of Meharry Medical College in Nashville, Tennessee in 1939, Dr. Walker became an instructor in physiology there from 1930 to 1942. He became an instructor in pathology at Meharry from 1941 until 1943. Then, Dr. Walker was an assistant professor and gynecology from 1939 until 1942. He was associate professor from 1942 until 1944. In 1944, he was appointed by President Franklin D. Roosevelt as Surgeon in The Reserve of The United States Public Health Service for a period of five years. He achieved the rank of full professor in surgery and gynecology at Hubbard Hospital also in 1944.

Dr. Walker had quite a broad experience with surgery. He could go over the whole peritoneal cavity, disregarding today's distinction between the abdominal and pelvic cavities. Walker knew urology and proctology. Dr. Walker also served as acting Chairman of the Department of Surgery at Hubbard. Finally, as the year 1944 progressed, Dr. Matthew Walker was made Chairman and Professor of the Department of Surgery. As such, Matthew Walker served as chairman of Meharry's medical school curriculum committee. During this period, with the Dean of the medical school, Dr. Daniel Thomas Rolfe, Dr. Walker revitalized the entire medical school curriculum. Walker served in this position of chair of the medical school curriculum in the 1950s and beyond. He was made a Fellow of the International College of Surgeons in 1947.

Matthew Walker Sr. M.D.

Matthew Walker M.D. was the author of many publications regarding surgery and research in medical journals. Principally, his research dealt with wound healing, peritonitis, and penicillin, nutritional and survival experiments following massive reactions of the intestines, vascular surgery, eosinophil counts and adrenocortical response and plasma expanders.

A five to seven-year stint at residential training was created under Dr. Walker's leadership in the Department of Surgery at Meharry. This training program, though rough on the residents, produced exceedingly fine surgeons. Among them was Dorothy Lavinia Brown, M.D. one of the first African-American women to be trained as a surgeon. Then, later (among other residential trainees of Dr. Walker's who were women), there was (the wife of Dr. George Simpson, an outstanding Meharrian) Dr. Dazelle Dean Simpson whom Dr. Charles Johnson rated as having "...one of the keenest intellects...." he had ever come across. Indeed, Walker was devoted to training his students thoroughly.

Walker served on many boards, among which were the Metropolitan Board of Hospital Commissioners and the Board of Clark Memorial Methodist Church. He also knew how to relax after days of grueling surgery. And, he was devoted to his church, Clark. On a Sunday, following the service to which he was accompanied by his family, Walker was known to gather the surplus Church bulletins and carry them to his patients and friends at his beloved Meharry - Hubbard hospital as he made his daily rounds. Matthew Sr. was a true lover of all people. When he wanted fishing buddies, he would call on anyone with a love of fishing. Thus, he was often found fishing with heads of businesses, fellow surgeons or doctors, members of his family, or janitors from any institution. Indeed, he could be seen drinking water or lemonade from the same thermos top as his buddies, for in those days, people did not worry so about catching certain diseases.

Matthew Walker traveled widely, and often, he took his wife along to many of the states within the United States, either to medical meetings or on personal jaunts. The pair also went abroad to Canada, Mexico, Jamaica, England, Italy where they had an audience with the Pope at the Vatican (even though they were staunch Methodists), and the African countries of Ghana, Liberia, Senegal, and Nigeria. Matthew loved Africa so, and wished the continent well so much, that he used to send for persons from various African countries to become trained as either nurses or doctors at Meharry. His family recalls having had many African nurses and doctors to be gathered around the dinner table at their home as Alice, a grand and generous cook, prepared magnificent meals for them.

As earlier noted, Matthew Walker established a residency program for his future doctors that was quite stunning. As he was working at Meharry, Walker kept getting called to Taborian Hospital in Mound Bayou, Mississippi. Taborian, built by an organization of Black people called the Knights and Daughters of Tabor, was set up with an arrangement for its patients to be provided with health care services. These services were covered under the Taborian insurance premiums; and, were prepaid. With Taborian Hospital opening on February 12, 1942, this service provided care that preceded Medicare, Medicaid, Health Maintenance Organizations (HMO) and other similar ones. There, Blacks had established medical facilities for themselves; however, proper medical professionals were not largely available. So, for part of the training;and, after obtaining a major Office of Economic Opportunity (OEO) grant from Washington, D. C., Dr. M. Walker built a training program that would involve a rotation from Meharry to Mound Bayou, a small Delta town. Dr. Asa G. Yancey writes of Dr. M. Walker (on learning of the loss of the services of the surgeon-in-charge at Taborian) having sent him, Yancey, as a team member to Mississippi to help provide medical services to these mostly very poor, Black, Delta people. In time, Walker, with some of his colleagues, took some young women from the cotton fields, and, over time, trained them so thoroughly that they became qualified nurses. In his zeal to keep the program up to par, Walker, himself, was known to have driven to Mound Bayou from his home in Nashville over 200 times. Dr. Walker's own daughter, the late Charlotte Rose Walker, M.D., also trained at Taborian among other places such as the Memorial Sloan-Kettering Hospital for Cancer and Allied Diseases in New York which partnership (between Meharry and Memorial) Dr. Walker also established. This training occurred at a time when going to Mound Bayou meant a long, hot drive down to the Mississippi town from Nashville. As a Black person driving, one had to know the places where he/she could stop comfortably for a bite to eat as segregation was still alive during part of this era.

While he was Chairman of the Department of Surgery, Dr. Walker's residency program was such that he trained a list of physicians who have become board-certified under the program. Because they loved and admired him so, in 1958, some of Walker's trainees, who were over 70 persons, started the Matthew Walker Surgical Society. This was done strictly in Walker's honor, and to help promote Dr. Walker's form of teaching for expansive learning.

During Dr. Walker's medical career, there were numerous opportunities for collaboration with esteemed physicians and medical practitioners at Vanderbilt University School of Medicine in Nashville, Tennessee. Among these opportunities was a time when an interim committee, charged with administering the affairs of Meharry Medical College while a search committee was formed to find a new president of the medical college, was needed. This happened after the resignation of President M. Don Clawson. One Dr. Amos Christie, Chairman of Vanderbilt School of Medicine's Department of Pediatrics, accepted membership on this committee. Dr. Matthew Walker also served on this committee. Then, much later, among speakers presenting at the annual Charles W. Johnson Sr., M.D. Symposium in Immunology was Dr. Alexander Lawtron, of Vanderbilt University. Then, there have been more associations between Vanderbilt and Meharry. Vanderbilt and other schools joined with Meharry in its capacity of serving as a training site and advisory body for international health.

Today, because of his industry and outstanding grant writing ability, there exist several Matthew Walker Comprehensive Health Centers (MWCHC) designed particularly to serve the poor and under served of all races for whom Matthew Walker had great compassion. Walker used to say that many times doctors told their patients to take certain medications before or after meals. He then went on to say that often, some patients would have to skip meals because they had not enough food for three meals a day. Therefore, they wouldn't be able to take all of the pills with an associated meal. Thus, he was always concerned about the poor and their lack of proper health care. Dr. Walker was able to see the opening of the first health care center named to honor him with many members of his family in attendance. (See http://www.mwchc.org See this note at the website : "MATTHEW WALKER COMPREHENSIVE HEALTH CENTER provides health care services for everyone, the insured and the uninsured. For patients without insurance, fees will be based on income. A co-payment may be required".) Currently, there are several other Matthew Walker Comprehensive Health Care Centers. Two are the MWCHC Clarksville Clinic and the MWCHC Murfreesboro Clinic. There is another one at Fisk University in Nashville. In total, there are seven other Matthew Walker Comprehensive Health Centers throughout Middle Tennessee, using the same philosophy and serving over 28,000 patients.

Dr. Matthew Walker Sr. was Chief Surgeon at the George W. Hubbard Hospital of Meharry Medical College, a consulting surgeon at the Riverside Sanitarium and Hospital in Nashville, and Director of Surgery at the Taborian Hospital, Mound Bayou, Mississippi. His memberships included the Volunteer State Medical Association, the R. F. Boyd Medical Society, the John Henry Hale Surgical Society, New York Academy of Science, American Association for the Advancement of Science, and membership in the Alpha Omega Alpha Honor Medical Society. Dr. Walker was featured on the cover of Alpha Omega Alpha's magazine, Pharos. He, along with a cameo portrait of his family, was pictured on the front of Pharos in spring, 2003 issue. He was also pictured on the cover of the Journal of the National Medical Association in May 1979 in a special issue dedicated to himself. Walker had been unanimously elected President of the National Medical Association in 1953, and served from August 1954 to August 1955. Walker was a member of the Omega Psi Phi fraternity, and Chairman of the Executive Committee of the Meharry Alumni Association.

Walker was generous to a fault. Later in life, those who knew him most intimately were told that when he would go Thanksgiving shopping, he would fill a basket for his family, and then, have a resident, who would accompany Walker, fill a basket for his own family. Additionally, though Walker never grew really rich on salary from Meharry-Hubbard, he saw to it that many of his poorer relatives whom he had left in Waterproof and nearby towns were often given money or clothing items to help them along their way. Furthermore, Matthew Walker Sr. paid college tuition for several University students (in addition to his own four children). These things he never bragged about. He simply wanted his fellow Blacks to have a chance at the good life as he did.

Dr. Matthew Walker Sr. died on July 15, 1978, in Nashville, Tennessee. At the time of his death, he had provided the surgical education to about half of the Black physicians in the United States. The American Journal of Surgery cited him in 1998 as one of seven exemplary Black surgeons. Dr. Charles Johnson, a Meharrian, wrote the following: "Matthew Walker was well-known and highly regarded as a teacher and surgeon. He was one of the most visible and widely respected of all Meharry's alumni." Then, Dr. W. Montague Cobb, as editor emeritus of the Journal of the National Medical Association, wrote: "During the 28 years this writer edited the Journal... it was possible to pay tribute to many outstanding figures...at Meharry. Yet, none stands taller than Matthew Walker. His stature will grow in the lengthening corridors of time – we shall not see his like again.".
