= Ruth Smith Lloyd =

Zoologist

- Born: Ruth M Smith; January 17, 1917; Washington, D.C., U.S.
- Died: February 5, 1995 (aged 78); Washington, D.C., U.S.
- Education: Mount Holyoke College; Howard University; Western Reserve University
- Known for: First African-American woman to earn a PhD in anatomy.
- Scientific career
- Fields: Anatomy
- Workplaces: Hampton Institute; Howard University

Ruth Smith Lloyd (January 17, 1917 – February 5, 1995) was a 20th-century scientist whose research focused on fertility, the relationship of sex hormones to growth, and the female sex cycle. She earned a PhD in the field of anatomy from Western Reserve University in 1941, making her the first African-American woman to have reached this achievement. Lloyd worked on the faculty of medicine at Howard University from 1942 to 1977. She married physician Sterling Morrison Lloyd in 1939, and they had three children: Marilyn, Sterling and David. She died of cancer in 1995.

== Early life and education ==
Ruth Smith was born in Washington, DC on January 17, 1917. Her parents were Mary Elizabeth (Morris) Smith, who was a clerk in the US Treasury Department, and Bradley Donald Smith, who was a pullman porter. She had two sisters named Hilda B, and M Otwiner. She was the youngest child. Lloyd attended the prestigious, historically black, Dunbar High School.

Lloyd attended Mount Holyoke College, which was then a mostly white institution. Her choice of college was reportedly influenced by the experience of her brother-in-law, William Montague Cobb, who was married to Hilda. Lloyd graduated with a bachelor of arts magna cum laude in 1937, majoring in zoology.

From 1937 to 1938, Lloyd studied for a master's degree in zoology at Howard University supported by a fellowship, under Ernest Everett Just. She had planned on becoming a school teacher, but was encouraged to undertake further study. Lloyd gained a fellowship from the Rosenwald Fund and undertook doctoral studies under Boris Rubenstein at Western Reserve University in Cleveland, Ohio. She studied the fertility of macaque monkeys, and the vaginal smear technique, becoming the first African-American woman to gain a PhD in anatomy with her dissertation, Adolescence of macaques (Macacus rhesus) in 1941.

== Career ==
Lloyd taught at Hampton Institute in Virginia from 1941 to 1942, and then joined the medical faculty of Howard University in 1942. Lloyd worked at Howard until her retirement in 1977. She taught physiology and anatomy, reaching the rank of associate professor in 1955. Her areas of research were endocrinology, sex-related hormones, and medical genetics. Lloyd also chaired the university's Committee on Student Guidance and was director of the Academic Reinforcement Program. From 1947, the Department of Anatomy in which she worked was chaired by William Montague Cobb.

She was a member of Sigma Xi honorary scientific society and the American Association of Anatomists.

== Personal life ==
Ruth Smith married Sterling Morrison Lloyd on December 30, 1939. He was a physician who also graduated from Howard University, and died in 1980. Lloyd had three children and eight grandchildren. In retirement, she was active in the All-Souls Unitarian Church, helped found the National Museum of Women in the Arts in 1987, and was a member of the social and service organization, Girl Friends.

Lloyd died of cancer at home in Washington on February 5, 1995.

== See also ==
- Timeline of women in science

== Sources ==
1. Cobb, W M (1967). "The Howard Department of Anatomy". J Natl Med Assoc. 59 (6): 421–428. PMC 2611414. PMID 4867381.
2. Epps, C H; Johnson, D G; Vaughan, A L (1993). "Black medical pioneers: African-American 'firsts' in academic and organized medicine. Part three". J Natl Med Assoc. 85 (10): 777–796. PMC 2568213. PMID 8254696.
3. Lloyd, Ruth Smith (1941). Adolescence of macaques (Macacus rhesus) (PhD thesis). Cleveland OH: Western Case University.
4. Lloyd, Ruth Smith (1951). "Ovarian changes in immature rabbits induced by equine gonadotrophin". The Anatomical Record. 109 (3): 431–445. doi:10.1002/ar.1091090303. PMID 14819658. S2CID 10909795.
5. Lloyd, Ruth Smith (1952). "The vaginal smear technique a critical review of its present status in the practice of medicine". J Natl Med Assoc. 44 (1): 15–21. PMC 2617095. PMID 14908569.
6. Lloyd, Ruth Smith; Rubenstein, Boris B (1941). "Multipla ova in the follicles of juvenile monkeys". Endocrinology. 29 (6): 1008–1014. doi:10.1210/endo-29-6-1008.
7. Oakes, Elizabeth H (2002). International encyclopedia of women scientists. Facts on File. ISBN 978-0816043811. OCLC 45835614.
8. Sammons, Vivian Ovelton (1990). Blacks in science and medicine. Hemisphere. ISBN 978-0891166658.
9. Sampson, Calvin C (1991). "William Montague Cobb MD PhD (1904-1990)". J Natl Med Assoc. 83 (1): 13–14. PMC 2627008.
10. Spangenburg, Ray; Moser, Kit (2003). African Americans in science, math, and invention. Facts On File. ISBN 978-1438107745.
11. Warren, Wini (1999). Black women scientists in the United States. Bloomington IN: Indiana UP. ISBN 978-0253336033.
12. "Ruth Smith Lloyd, Howard U. Professor". Washington Post. 9 February 1995.
