= Robert F. Boyd =

American physician and dentist

Robert Fulton Boyd
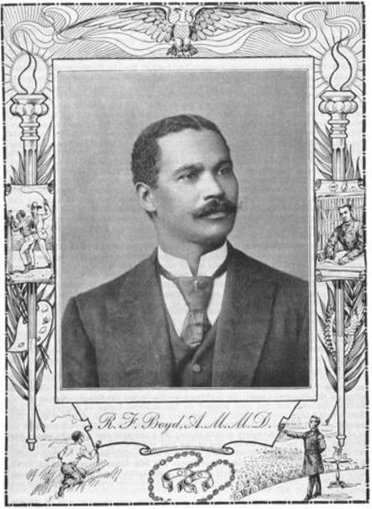
- Born: July 8, 1855; Pulaski, Tennessee, U.S.
- Died: July 20, 1912 (aged 54); Nashville, Tennessee, U.S.
- Education: Central Tennessee College; Meharry Medical College; University of Chicago
- Known for: First President of National Medical Association

Robert Fulton Boyd (July 8, 1855 – July 20, 1912) was an African-American medical doctor, professor, politician, and one of the co-founders of the National Medical Association, serving as its first president between 1895 and 1898. He also researched the effects of racial segregation in healthcare.

== Early life and education ==
Boyd was born in Pulaski, Tennessee, on July 8, 1855, to two slave parents, Maria Coffey and Edward Boyd. His mother was moved south during the American Civil War, returning in 1866 to take Boyd and his younger brother to Nashville, where Boyd was sent to live with surgeon and confederate veteran Paul F. Eve.

During this time, Boyd attended night classes at Old Fisk School (now Fisk University) while working during the day for real estate agent General James H. Hickman. Boyd began teaching in 1876 and became principal of the Public School for Negroes in Pulaski while still a student in himself, and also opened a night school around this time.

Boyd received his medical degree from Meharry Medical College in 1882, where he was awarded additional qualifications in dentistry and pharmacy in the following years. He then obtained postgraduate education in surgery Ann Arbor, Michigan, and in women and children's diseases in Chicago, Illinois. Following this, he returned to Nashville and became assistant surgeon to Paul F. Eve.

== Work and research ==
Boyd had an extensive teaching career at Meharry Medical College and he would work in a variety of departments; those known of which listed in the table below.

Known positions held by Robert F. Boyd at Meharry Medical College
Position	Year
Adjunct Professor of Chemistry	1882–1884
Professor of Physiology	1884–1888
Professor of Anatomy and Physiology	1888–1889
Professor of Physiology and Hygiene	1889–1890
Professor of Physiology, Hygiene, and Clinical Medicine	1890–1893
Professor of Diseases of Women and Clinical Medicine	1893–unknown

In 1887, Boyd established a medical and dental practice in Nashville, with a focus on providing care to underserved individuals. In addition to practicing medicine, he also taught the members of these communities about the causes, treatments, and prevention of tuberculosis. By the early 20th century, he was reputedly treating patients of all socio-economic classes. Boyd noted the comparably higher mortality rates of African-Americans in cities in the south, and published a study containing some of the earliest observations regarding the disparity in health outcomes of African-Americans, and suggested medical solutions to the problems he identified.

The city of Nashville revoked the access of Meharry Medical College's students to the local teaching hospital in 1900, and Boyd opened Mercy Hospital in response to this, where he served as 'superintendent' and surgeon-in-chief until his death in 1912. It is recorded that this hospital later burned down and Boyd Infirmary built in its stead, although other sources indicate that Mercy Hospital was replaced in 1916 and named the George W. Hubbard Hospital. Towards the end of the 19th century, he was offered the office of surgeon-in-chief at Freedmen's Hospital in Washington, D.C. Towards the end of his life, he had surgical clinics in Mississippi, Alabama, Georgia, Texas and Tennessee.

In 1892 he was nominated to stand for Mayor of Nashville and for a seat in the Tennessee General Assembly, both for the Republican Party. However a year later, the associated Democratic and Republican Executive Committees disavowed black candidates, meaning that Boyd was only successful in being nominated to a "citizen's ticket" in protest. The 1893 Nashville mayoral election was instead won by Democrat George Blackmore Guild.

Boyd had an active role in the creation of the National Medical Association, which was founded in 1895. He became its first president, and was succeeded in 1898 by H. T. Noel. In 1909, Boyd was elected president of the People's Savings Bank and Trust Company, Nashville's African-American banks.

== Personal life ==
Boyd never married nor had children.

In the 1890s, Boyd acquired a house in Nashville of $14,000 value which was reputedly the most expensive house bought by a person of African descent in Tennessee up to that date.

Boyd was also involved in a variety of fraternal societies and held high ranks within them; he held the title of Supreme Medical Register for the Knights of Pythias of North America, South America, Europe, Asia, Africa and Australia. He was also a longstanding member of various societies at Meharry Medical College, an active member of St. Paul A.M.E. Church in Nashville, had received an honorary membership at the Anthropological Society of London, and was a member of the Congress of Colored People.

== Death ==
Boyd died suddenly on July 20, 1912, at the age of 54, after an "attack of acute indigestion". His funeral services were held in the Ryman Auditorium, and his body was buried in Nashville's Mt. Ararat Cemetery. At the time of his death, he was considered one of the leading African-American physicians in the United States, and amongst the wealthiest.

== Historical context ==
Boyd lived at a time when newly freed African-Americans experienced racism, violence, and segregation. He came from a background of slavery and illiteracy, after struggling to achieve his early educational requisites, he was limited by the closed-door policies established by medical colleges and hospitals at the time.

The Negro doctor has had to struggle in a fashion and with a persistency rarely, if ever, equaled by any other group seeking professional status.

— E. H. Jones, M. D.
