= John A. Kenney Sr. =

American physician

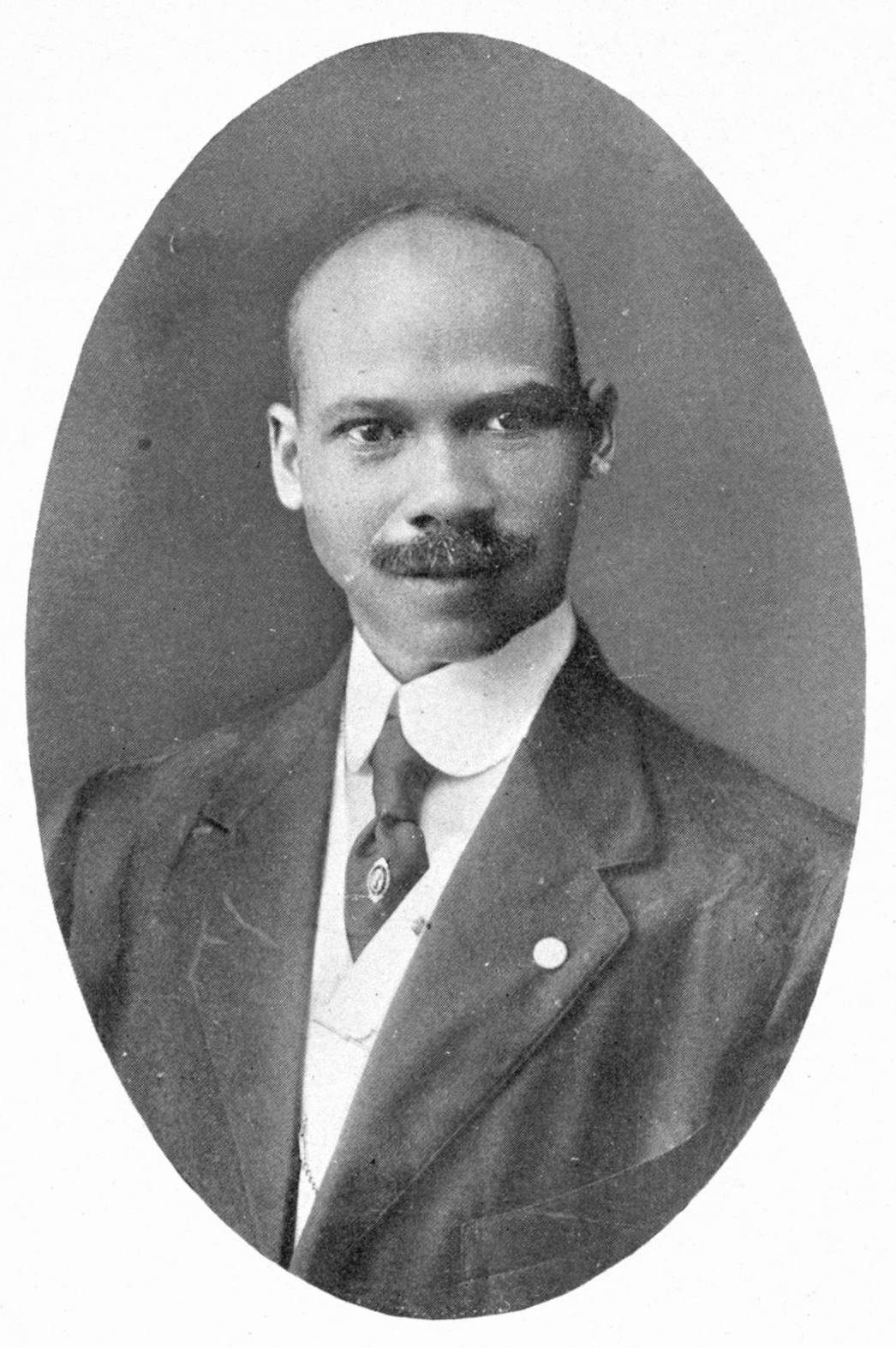
- Born: June 11, 1874; Albemarle County, Virginia
- Died: January 29, 1950 (aged 75); Montclair, New Jersey
- Education: Hampton University, Leonard Medical School
- Relatives: John A. Kenney Jr. (son); William Oscar Armstrong (father-in-law)
- Medical career
- Profession: Surgeon
- Field: Surgery

John Andrew Kenney Sr. (June 11, 1874 – January 29, 1950) was an African-American surgeon who was the medical director and chief surgeon of the John A. Andrew Memorial Hospital at the Tuskegee Institute in Tuskegee, Alabama, from 1902 to 1922. He served as secretary of the National Medical Association (NMA) from 1904 to 1912, and was elected president of the NMA in 1912. He was the editor-in-chief of its journal, the Journal of the National Medical Association, from 1916 to 1948. He also served as the personal physician of both Booker T. Washington and George Washington Carver.

== Biography ==
John A. Kenney was born in Albemarle County, Virginia on June 11, 1874. He was educated at Hampton Institute and Shaw University, and earned his medical degree from Leonard Medical College in 1901.

After fleeing Tuskegee in 1924 under threat from the KKK, he first took refuge in Dr. George E. Cannon's home. He went on to found the Kenney Memorial Hospital in Newark, New Jersey. Between 1927 and 1934, Kenney Memorial served 4,543 bed patients, 584 free clinic patients and performed 1,109 operations with only 19 deaths. The hospital was renamed the Booker T. Washington Community Hospital in 1935. It closed in 1953. The building was purchased by the New Salem Baptist Church in 1959 and is on the National Register of Historic Places. A museum honoring Kenney is planned for the site.

In 1939, Kenney returned to Tuskegee to head the Tuskegee Institute Hospital. In 1944, Kenney moved back to Montclair, New Jersey and saw patients at his home, alongside his son John A. Kenney Jr. The Kenneys were a medical family: sons John A. Jr. and Howard were doctors, and daughter Elizabeth Kenney Quisenberry worked with Dr. M.O. Bousfield, who became president of the National Medical Association. Middle son Oscar A. Kenney was a Tuskegee Airman killed in a plane crash near Tuskegee Army Air Field during a "routine training flight." Kenney's wife Frieda Kenney was the first African-American woman to graduate from Boston University.

He died at Mountainside Hospital in Montclair, New Jersey on January 29, 1950.
