= African Americans in Tennessee =

Largest racial and ethnic minority in Tennessee, United States

Total population
- 1,175,173 (2020, ADOS, various immigrant groups and their descendants) ADOS, various immigrant groups and their descendants (including those of ancestral descent)

Regions with significant populations
- Shelby County (Memphis)

Languages
- Southern American English, African-American Vernacular English, Affrilachian English, various languages and dialects among immigrants

Religion
- Christianity, Black Protestant, Hoodoo, other faiths and non-faiths

African Americans in the state of Tennessee, or Black Tennesseans, are the second-largest census "race" category after whites, making up 17% of the state's population in 2010. African Americans arrived in the region prior to statehood. They lived both as slaves and as free citizens with restricted rights up to the Civil War.

The state, and particularly the major cities of Memphis and Nashville, have been important sites in African-American culture and the Civil Rights Movement. The majority of African Americans in Tennessee reside in the western part of the state, which had a concentration of large cotton plantations in the antebellum period. Many freedmen stayed in the region after emancipation and the abolition of slavery. Historically there have been much smaller Black populations in the Middle Tennessee and East Tennessee (Appalachian) regions, because of the different geography and agricultural patterns.

== Demographics ==
In the 2020 Census, 1,092,948 Tennessee residents were identified as African American (26.3% of the total 6,910,840). In 18 of the state's 95 counties, African Americans make up more than 10% of the population: Shelby (51.3%), Haywood (50.6%), Hardeman (40.0%), Madison (36.4%), Lauderdale (33.5%), Fayette (26.4%), Lake (26.2%), Davidson (24.2%), Montgomery (20.3%), Tipton (17.8%), Gibson (17.8%), Hamilton (17.6%), Trousdale (16.5%), Rutherford (15.8%), Dyer (14.6%), Crockett (13.5%), Maury (11.2%), Obion (10.3%). Most of these counties are in West Tennessee, where plantation agriculture was concentrated. African Americans in the seven counties of Shelby (477,321), Davidson (173,092), Hamilton (64,428), Rutherford (53,977), Montgomery (44,569), Knox (40,360), Madison (36,004) make up more than 81% of the all African Americans in the state.

Now majority-black, the city of Memphis is home to more than four hundred thousand African Americans, making it one of the largest population centers of this ethnic group. At least eight other municipalities have African-American majorities: Bolivar, Brownsville, Gallaway, Gates, Henning, Humboldt, Mason, Stanton, Whiteville.

=== Historical population ===
Davidson County, whose principal city is the state capital of Nashville, Tennessee, was home from 1800 to 1850 to the largest share of African Americans in the state, in part because it was settled before the western part and numerous planters held slaves in Middle Tennessee. Since 1860, Shelby County (where Memphis is located) has had the largest population of African Americans.

Black Population in Tennessee, 1790–1860
| Census year | 1790 | 1800 | 1810 | 1820 | 1830 | 1840 | 1850 | 1860 |
|---|---|---|---|---|---|---|---|---|
| Total Tennessee residents | 35,691 | 105,602 | 261,727 | 422,823 | 681,904 | 829,210 | 1,002,717 | 1,109,800 |
| Free Black people | 361 | 309 | 1,318 | 2,739 | 4,511 | 5,524 | 6,442 | 7,300 |
| Blacks living in slavery | 3,417 | 13,584 | 44,734 | 80,105 | 141,647 | 183,059 | 239,439 | 275,719 |

== History ==
Most of Tennessee's African Americans were enslaved from the colonial era until the conclusion of the Civil War in 1865 and abolition of slavery. Although activists in the state played a significant role in early U.S. abolitionism, the state government backed slavery in the 1834 constitution, when it was dominated by elite whites of the planter class. The legislature also passed laws that required newly emancipated Blacks to leave the state, and encouraged European immigration. But a small population of free Blacks remained, resisting violence and other attempts to push them out. Following the 1865 end of slavery and the 1870 Fifteenth Amendment that allowed Black men to hold political office, Black Tennesseans played a prominent role in politics. During Reconstruction, they joined the Republican Party and elected a number to the state legislature, which was biracial during these years. Samuel McElwee held office in the 1880s and was nominated for Speaker of the House. Sekou Franklin and Ray Block Jr. write:

"Blacks ran for state and local offices from the 1870s through the 1890s: in Chattanooga, George Sewall, Robert Marsha, David Medlow, and W. B. Kennedy were elected to local offices; in Knoxville, J. B. Young made a failed attempt at the mayor's office in 1872; William Yardley served on the Knoxville City Council in the 1870s and ran for governor in 1876. From 1871 to 1890, nine blacks were elected to the Knoxville City Council, and several blacks served on the Knox County court, including Yardley, Melvin Gentry, William Brooks Sr., and Sam Maples. In 1875, Randall Brown served on Nashville's city commission, and blacks comprised almost one-third of the municipal government personnel."

=== Prior to statehood ===
Early African Americans came to Tennessee primarily from the colonies of Virginia and North Carolina. They, or their parents and grandparents, arrived in North America via the Trans-Atlantic slave trade from West Africa. Early African-American arrivals included those purchased as slaves by Cherokee Indians and brought by European traders living in native villages. Wealthy white families from Culpeper, Virginia, brought enslaved African Americans with them to the Powell Valley in southwest Virginia in 1769.

Historian Cynthia Cumfer notes that slavery in early Tennessee was an isolating experience for African Americans, even in comparison with Virginia and North Carolina. According to 1779-80 records, the vast majority of slaveholders held legal title over just one or two persons, "with the largest holding being ten or eleven slaves." Enslaved African Americans sought fellow company through taverns, churches, workplaces, and their owners' kitchens.

The territorial government of Tennessee rapidly passed laws similar to those in slave states to restrict the lives of enslaved persons, denying slaves the right to property, to bear arms (unless designated as the huntsman of their plantation), and to sell goods.

=== Early statehood ===
In the 1790 Census, there were 361 free persons of color in Tennessee, and 3,417 people living in slavery. Under Tennessee's first constitution, drafted in 1795 and effective with statehood in 1796, free Blacks were not restricted from voting, although there is no evidence they were permitted to do so in practice.

As in several other states following the American Revolution, in the first three decades of the 1800s, public sentiment supporting the abolition of slavery swelled in Tennessee. The legislature passed an 1826 law that prohibited bringing slaves into the state for purposes of sale, rather than the direct use of their labor. Freedmen were required "without fail [to] have [their] emancipation records with [them] at any time and place in order to prove [their] freedom." In 1831, following Nat Turner's Rebellion in Virginia, however, the state government mandated that emancipated slaves must immediately depart the state, and prohibited the migration of free Blacks to Tennessee. Planters were fearful of the influence of free Blacks on enslaved persons.

By the 1834 State Constitutional Convention in Nashville, delegates defeated a proposal for gradual abolition of slavery, to take place over a twenty-year period. Despite wide-ranging debate, the pro-slavery faction was victorious across the board. The new constitution formally forbade Blacks from voting, whether slave or free. It also stripped the legislature of any "power to pass laws for the emancipation of slaves, without the consent of their owner or owners." The right to bear arms was restricted to "the free white men of this State."

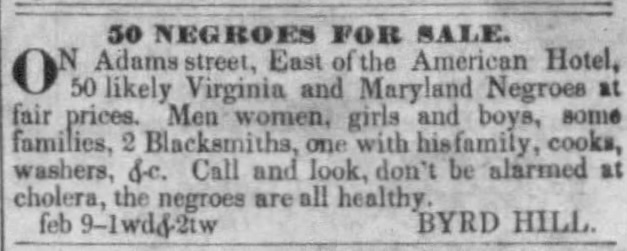
"50 Negroes for Sale" from Virginia and Maryland, The Memphis Daily Eagle, February 16, 1849

In 1855 the state repealed its 30-year-ban prohibiting interstate slave trading, reflecting that Memphis slave-traders like Bolton, Dickens, & Co., Byrd Hill, and Nathan Bedford Forrest, had openly flouted this law for many years.

=== Civil War and Reconstruction ===
Tennessee was the last state to join the Confederacy, on June 24, 1861. Union forces identified Nashville as an immediate target, because it had a strategic location on the Cumberland River and railroad lines. It fell to Union troops in February 1862. Union forces moving down the Mississippi River captured Memphis, Tennessee from the Confederacy in the First Battle of Memphis on June 6, 1862. While under Union control, both cities swelled with freed slaves and other refugees. In 1860 around 3,000 African Americans lived in Memphis, but by war's end, some twenty thousand had congregated in the area, many south of the city.

After the United States Colored Troops were established in 1863, African-American troops in the Union Army became a symbol of new social equality. They disrupted longstanding patterns of racial deference, publicly bore arms, and were seen to receive respect of white officers. Many Southern whites in Memphis and Nashville resented these changes.

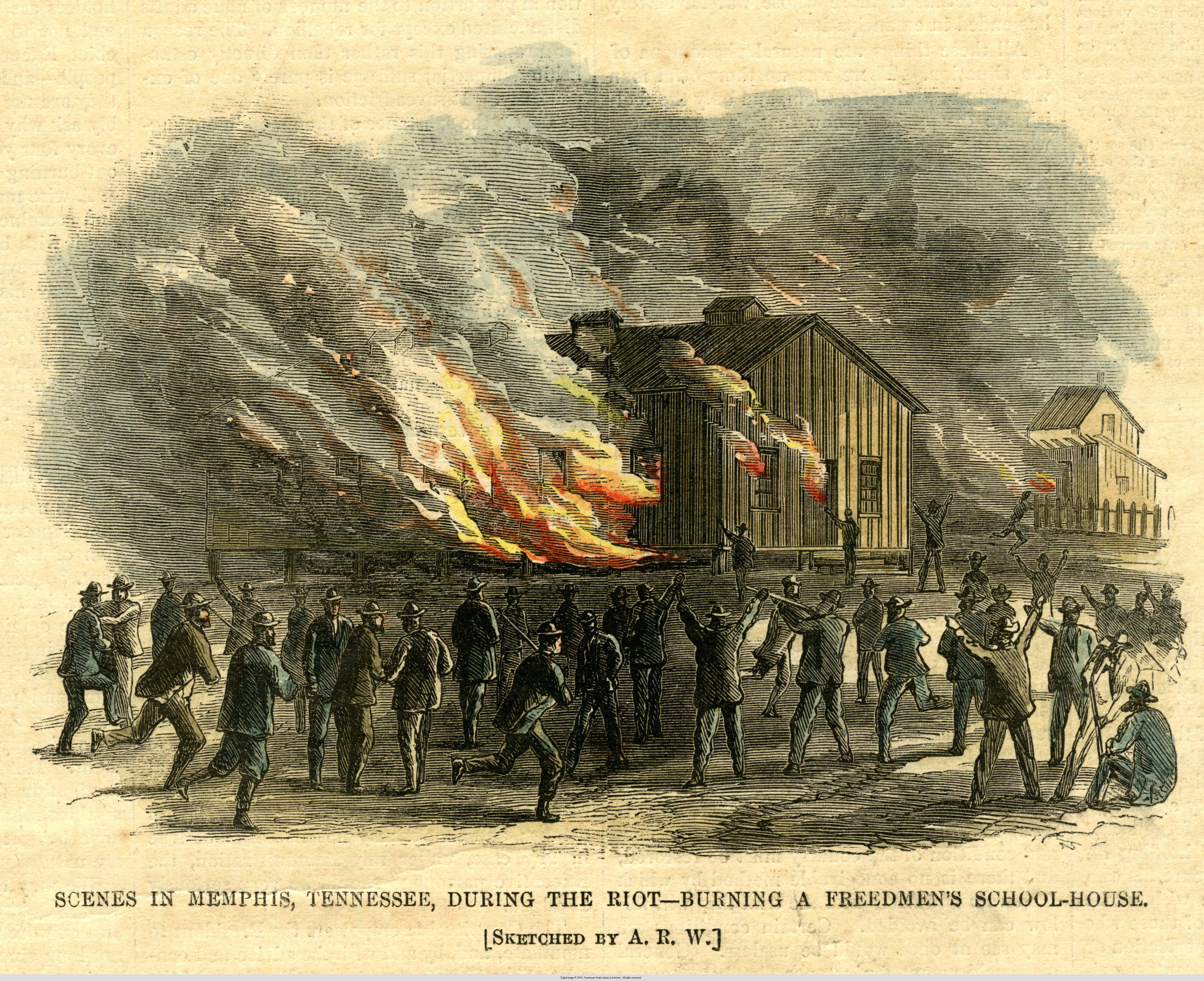
Freedmen's schoolhouse burned, Memphis riots of 1866, as illustrated in Harper's Weekly.

In the aftermath of the war, Memphis became the scene of tensions between white authorities and African American soldiers. The troops effectively countermanded the proposal by Freedmen's Bureau superintendent Nathan A. M. Dudley to arrest jobless blacks and send them into contract labor on rural plantations. Black military police also resisted efforts by local white police (who were predominately ethnic Irish immigrants and their descendants) to close dance houses patronized by whites and to enforce prewar customs of Black deference.

After the last Black soldiers at Fort Pickering were discharged on April 30, 1866, confrontation arose. Newly in the status of veterans, armed Blacks confronted police who attempted to arrest one of them. Both sides exchanged gunfire, and a police officer was killed. The veterans retreated to Fort Pickering, where they were disarmed by Union officials. An uncontrolled, police-organized posse, which included white laborers, firemen, and small proprietors, began a two-day pillage and massacre of black neighborhoods of Memphis, while white Union soldiers led by Union General Stoneman did not intervene until the second day. The Army had only recently ended martial law in the city, which restored civilian control in Memphis. These Memphis riots of 1866 resulted in the deaths of 46 blacks and 2 whites, over 100 beatings and robberies of blacks, 5 reported rapes, and the destruction by fire of 91 homes, 4 churches and 12 schools (all black). Some white missionaries who were known to be teachers of or sympathetic to blacks were also beaten or threatened, after which some fled Memphis.

=== Post-Reconstruction and Jim Crow ===
No hospital in Tennessee served African Americans until the Millie E. Hale Hospital was established in Nashville in July 1916 by Dr. John Henry Hale and Millie E. Hale, who were husband and wife.

=== Civil Rights Movement ===
In 1956, Clinton High School was the first public school in the state to be desegregated by federal court order. On August 26, 1956, the Clinton 12: Jo Ann Allen, Bobby Cain, Anna Theresser Caswell, Minnie Ann Dickey, Gail Ann Epps, Ronald Hayden, William Latham, Alvah J. McSwain, Maurice Soles, Robert Thacker, Regina Turner, and Alfred Williams, walked from the Green McAdoo School to the high school. On September 1 white supremacists John Kasper and Asa Carter incited cross burnings and violence. The National Guard was deployed to Clinton for two months to suppress the violence. On October 5, 1958, Clinton High School was bombed, but no one was injured. The city bussed students to Oak Ridge until 1960.

Activists in Nashville and Memphis played central roles in the Civil Rights Movement. In 1957, Nashville public schools began to be desegregated using the "stair-step" plan as proposed by Dan May. Some whites protested integration and a bomb was detonated at Hattie Cotton Elementary School. No one was killed, and after that, the desegregation plan proceeded without violence. On February 13, 1960, hundreds of college students involved in the Nashville Student Movement launched a sit-in campaign to desegregate lunch counters throughout the city. Although their efforts were initially met with violence and arrests, the protesters eventually succeeded in pressuring local businesses to end the practice of racial segregation. Many of the activists involved in the Nashville sit-ins—including James Bevel, Diane Nash, Bernard Lafayette, John Lewis and others—went on to organize the Student Nonviolent Coordinating Committee (SNCC). This emerged as one of the most influential organizations of the civil rights movement. The first action credited to SNCC was the 1961 Nashville Open Theater Movement, which James Bevel developed the strategy for and directed tactics. It succeeded in desegregating the city's theaters. Nashville also became the site for revival of the Freedom Riders journey by bus in 1961 after the original riders from Washington, D.C., were stopped in Birmingham, Alabama by extreme violence. Numerous college students joined the movement to ride interstate buses into the Deep South, challenging state segregation rules.

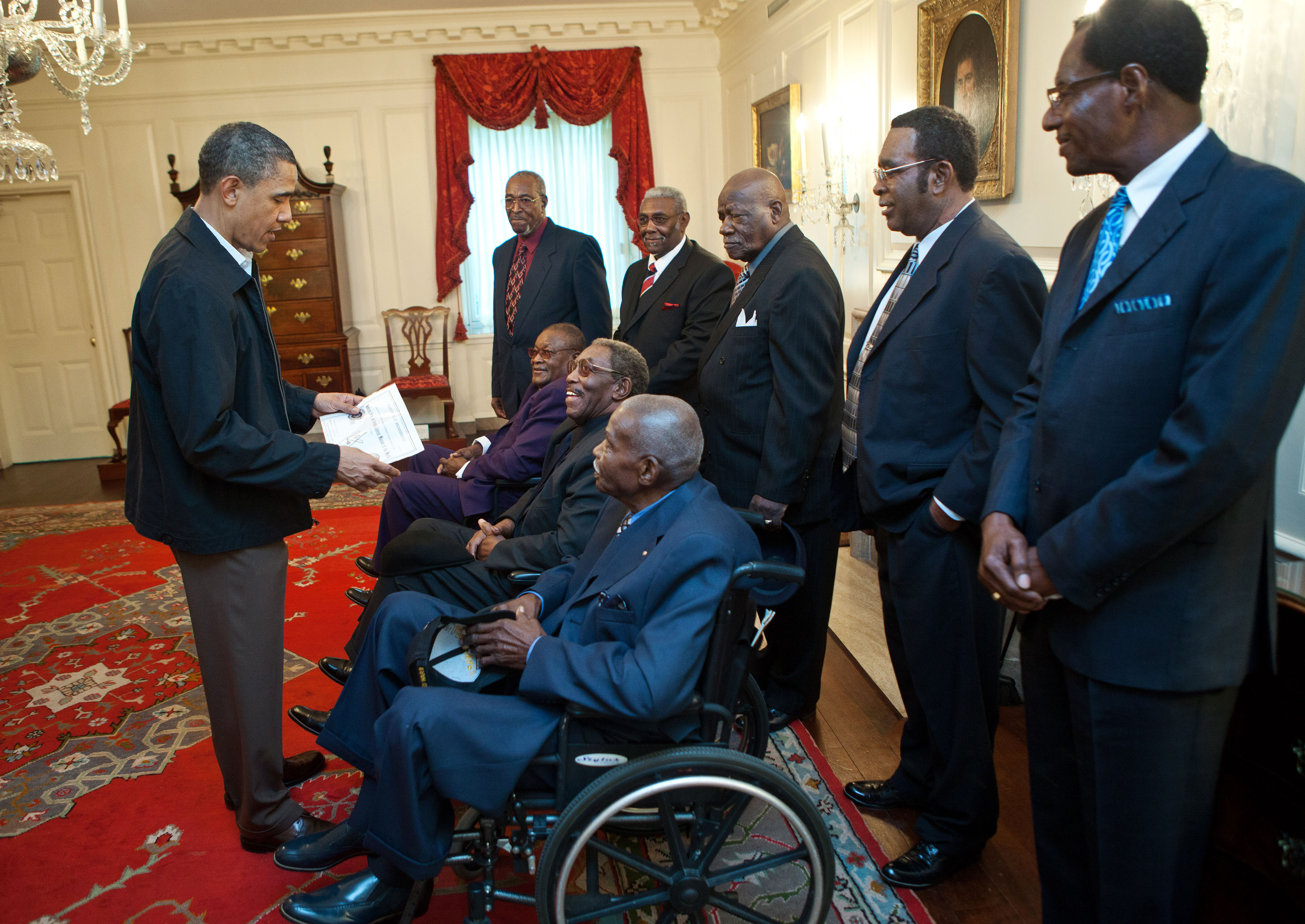
President Barack Obama meets with workers who participated in the 1968 Memphis sanitation strike in 2011

In 1968 a sanitation workers' strike in Memphis was linked to both the Civil Rights Movement and the Poor People's Campaign. Prominent minister and activist Martin Luther King Jr. went to the city in support of the striking workers. He was assassinated on April 4, 1968, at the Lorraine Motel, the day after giving his prophetic "I've Been to the Mountaintop" speech at the Mason Temple. The white assassin, James Earl Ray, was a racist escaped convict who had no previous connection to the city.

== Political power ==
When Tennessee was admitted as a state, most of the African Americans there were enslaved and had no political rights. Some free people of color also lived in the state and were allowed to vote but a new law passed in 1834 deprived them of the right to vote. After the American Civil War, the state's ratification of the Fourteenth and Fifteenth amendments resulted in African-American men being granted the right to vote in 1866. By the end of 1867, around 40,000 African Americans had joined the voter rolls, generally joining the Republican Party.

From 1873 to 1888, thirteen African Americans were elected as Republicans to the Tennessee House of Representatives, mostly in the post-Reconstruction era. Among them, David Foote Rivers was elected twice to represent Fayette County as a Republican in 1882 and 1884; however, he was driven out of the county by racial violence and was unable to serve his second term. Jesse M. H. Graham was elected to represent Montgomery County in 1896. By then the sole Black member of the legislature, he was stripped of his seat due to a residency requirement (he had lived in Louisville, Kentucky until October 1895). The Tennessee State Library and Archives notes, "According to several newspaper reports, the General Assembly soon [after] passed a bill blocking the election of black candidates."

Discriminatory ballot restrictions designed to disenfranchise Black voters were enacted via the Dortch Law of 1889. No African American was elected to the Tennessee legislature from 1888 through 1962. Archie Walter Willis Jr. became the first Black legislator in Tennessee in over seven decades in 1964, after passage of the federal Civil Rights Act that year.

Today in the early 21st century, African Americans make up 13% of the legislature; they are all registered Democrats, having aligned with the party that supported the civil rights movement. No African American has been elected governor or lieutenant governor of Tennessee.

In the early 20th century, many cities adopted a city commissioner form of government. At the time, it was considered progressive, in an effort to supersede what was known as machine politics in cities. It called for all city commissioner positions to be elected at-large. In practice, that meant that only candidates who could each attract a majority of voters could be elected. In majority-white cities, this form of government generally resulted in even substantial minority groups of voters being unable to elect candidates of their choice. Such was the case in Chattanooga, Tennessee, which was majority white and affiliated with the Republican Party. Twelve Black residents filed a federal civil rights suit against the city, Brown v. Board of Commissioners of the City of Chattanooga (1987). The court ruled in favor of the African-American plaintiffs. In 1989 the city's governing body was changed to a 9-member council with members elected from 9 single-member districts, defined by census tract and racial demographics. Three districts had a majority of African-American residents, and they comprised the majority of the city's 36% African-American population, most of whose voters were members of the Democratic Party. In 2017 four African Americans (1 incumbent, 3 new candidates) were elected to the Chattanooga City Council.

Willie Wilbert Herenton was the first African American elected as Mayor of Memphis, Tennessee. (J. O. Patterson Jr. was appointed to that office during 1982.) He served five terms from 1991 to 2009. He was succeeded by Myron Lowery (pro tem, 2009) and A C Wharton (2009–2015). Wharton had previously served as Shelby County's first African-American mayor.

== Education ==
As of 2012, African Americans make up a larger share of the public school system than of the population as a whole. In that year, 230,556 African American students attended pre-Kindergarten through 12th grade public schools, 23.6% of the 935,317 students enrolled overall.

Sixty years after Brown v. Board of Education, schooling in Tennessee continues to be substantially segregated by race, while influenced strongly by suburbanization and changes to housing patterns, as well as changes to demographics in many areas. During the 2011–12 school year, 44.8% of African-American students in Tennessee public schools attended schools that had more than 90% minority students (this is the 9th highest percentage in the nation). Some 25.3% attended majority-white schools.

Racial integration in higher education was prohibited by the 1870 state constitution, passed during the Reconstruction era and a compromise in order to gain support for public education in the lower grades. In 1937 and 1939 the University of Tennessee denied admission to seven African Americans. It admitted its first African-American student, Gene Gray, in 1952 under a court ruling the prior year that ended the integration ban for graduate and professional students. Following Brown v. Board of Education and the 1960 Nashville sit-in movement, the UT Board of Trustees announced an end to racial discrimination in admissions on November 18, 1960.

In 2014–15, 1,802 of the university's 27,410 students were African American. Memphis State University was integrated in 1959 with the admission of the Memphis State Eight, eight African-American students. These students were initially required to remain on campus only for the duration of their classes. Today, Black students make up more than one-third of the campus student body, and they participate fully in all campus activities.

Tennessee is the site of seven historically Black colleges and universities (HBCUs). The racially integrated and abolitionist American Missionary Association established eleven universities in the aftermath of the Civil War, including two in Tennessee, LeMoyne Normal and Commercial School at Camp Shiloh in 1862, and Fisk Free Colored School in Nashville in 1866. LeMoyne moved to Memphis in 1863 and is now incorporated in LeMoyne-Owen College; Fisk developed as the prestigious Fisk University. The Agricultural and Industrial State Normal School, the only publicly funded HBCU in the state, began serving students in 1912. Renamed several times, having developed its curriculum and merged with the predominantly white University of Tennessee at Nashville in 1979, it is now known as Tennessee State University. The remaining HBCUs are: Knoxville College (1875), Meharry Medical College (1876), Lane College (1882), and American Baptist College (1924).

== See also ==
- History of Tennessee
- History of slavery in Tennessee
- List of African-American newspapers in Tennessee
- Demographics of Tennessee
- Black Southerners
- History of Tennessee
- History of slavery in Tennessee
