= William Montague Cobb =

American anthropologist (1904–1990)

Montague Cobb

President of the NAACP
- In office 1976–1982
- Preceded by: Kivie Kaplan
- Succeeded by: James Kemp

Personal details
- Born: William Montague Cobb; October 12, 1904 Washington, D.C., U.S.
- Died: November 20, 1990 (aged 86) Washington, D.C., U.S.
- Spouse: Hilda Smith
- Children: 2
- Relatives: Ruth Smith Lloyd (sister-in-law)
- Education: Amherst College (BA); Howard University (MD); Case Western Reserve University (PhD)

William Montague Cobb (1904–1990) was an American board-certified physician and a physical anthropologist. As the first African-American Ph.D. in anthropology, and the only one until after the Korean War, his main focus in the anthropological discipline was studying the idea of race and its negative impact on communities of color. He was also the first African-American President of the National Association for the Advancement of Colored People. His career both as a physician and a professor at Howard University was dedicated to the advancement of African-American researchers, and he was heavily involved in civil rights activism. Cobb wrote prolifically and contributed both popular and scholarly articles during the course of his career. His work has been noted as a significant contribution to the development of the sub-discipline of biocultural anthropology during the first half of the 20th century. Cobb was also an accomplished educator and taught over 5000 students in the social and health sciences during his lifetime.

== Early and personal life ==
Cobb was born on October 12, 1904, in Washington DC. His mother, Alexizne Montague Cobb, grew up in Massachusetts and was partly of Native American descent. His father, William Elmer Cobb, grew up in Selma, Alabama. His parents met in Washington DC when his father started his own printing business for the African-American community.

The tipping point for Cobb's initial interest in anthropology came from a book of the animal kingdom that his grandfather owned. In this book, there were illustrations of human beings separated by race, but were illustrated with what Cobb called "equal dignity." This led to an interest in the concept of race, as the same type of "equal dignity" was not granted in the society that surrounded Cobb's life.

Cobb attended Dunbar High School, a highly esteemed Washington, DC. African-American high school in 1917. He was a successful student and athlete, and went on to win championships in cross-country as well as lightweight and welterweight boxing during his high school and collegiate years. He married Hilda B. Smith, Ruth Smith Lloyd's sister, and they had two children. Cobb died of pneumonia on November 20, 1990, at the age of 86.

== Education ==
Following his graduation from Dunbar High School in 1921, Cobb earned his Bachelor of Arts from Amherst College in 1925. Following completion of his baccalaureate degree, he received a Blodgett Scholarship for proficiency in biology which allowed him to pursue research in embryology at Woods Hole Marine Biology Laboratory. He earned his MD (Doctor of Medicine) in 1929 from the Howard University Medical School. He worked jobs throughout his time in medical school. Cobb then accepted a position at Howard University which he was offered prior to his graduation. Numa P. G. Adams, who was the Dean of Howard University at the time, was assigned the task of organizing a new faculty of African-American physicians to help advance the school in the medical field. Cobb, in turn had the aspirations of creating a laboratory of anatomy and physical anthropology at Howard University that would have the resources for African-American scholars to contribute to debates in racial biology. As a part of Dean Adams' efforts, Cobb was sent to study under biological anthropologist T. Wingate Todd at Case Western Reserve University. Cobb's dissertation work was an expansive survey of the Hamann-Todd Skeletal Collection, a large skeletal population now housed at the Cleveland Museum of Natural History which is associated with Case Western Reserve University. He earned his Ph.D. in Anthropology in 1932 and his dissertation was published under the title Human Archives the following year.

== Career ==
Following the conferral of his doctorate, Cobb remained at Case Western Reserve University as a fellow, where he continued work on the Hamman-Todd Collection with a focus on cranial suture closure. His 1940 publication "Cranio-Facial Union in Man" produced as a result of this work established his expertise as a functional anatomist and is one of his most widely cited works to date. During this period, Cobb also worked with physical anthropologist Aleš Hrdlička on a survey of the skeletal collection at the Smithsonian Institution in Washington, DC. He returned to the Howard University Medical School in 1930 where he taught for the majority of his career and established the W. Montague Cobb Skeletal Collection. He became the university's first distinguished professor in 1969 and became professor emeritus in 1973. In addition to his work at Howard, Cobb also taught at Stanford University, the University of Arkansas at Little Rock, the University of Washington, the University of Maryland, West Virginia University, Harvard Medical School, the Medical College of Wisconsin at Milwaukee, and the Catholic University of America during his lifetime.

Cobb was heavily involved with a number of anthropological and medical organizations during his career. He was an active member of the American Association of Physical Anthropologists since its second meeting in 1930 and served on its board on multiple occasions, both as its vice president (1948–50 and 1954–56) and president (1957–59). He also held leadership roles with the Anthropological Society of Washington, the American Association for the Advancement of Science, the American Eugenics Society, and the Medico-Chirurgical Society of the District of Columbia. He also served as chairman on the Council of Medical Education and Hospitals for two terms (1948–63).

Throughout his lifetime Cobb pursued work aimed at furthering the opportunities of African Americans both within society in general and within the health sciences. He was an active member of the National Association for the Advancement of Colored People (NAACP) and served as its president from 1976 to 1982. He created the Imhotep Conferences on Hospital Integration in 1957 as a part of the NAACP, an annual conference seeking to end hospital and medical school segregation that continued until 1964. He was an active member of the National Medical Association, an organization dedicated to the advancement of African-American physicians and other health professionals. He was a longtime contributor to its journal, the Journal of the National Medical Association, of which he served as editor from 1944 to his death in 1990. He also served as the organization's president from 1964 to 1965. In addition to his involvement in both African-American and European American-led professional organizations and journals, Cobb was active in community outreach through work on race and health published in popular African-American magazines such as Negro Digest, Pittsburgh Courier, and Ebony.

== Scholarship ==
Throughout his career, Cobb applied his technical expertise in functional anatomy and medicine to a variety of topics, including the issues of African-American health, child development, and disproving scientific justifications for racism. His approach has been characterized as a form of applied anthropology and activist scholarship. His work explicitly critiqued hierarchical understandings of human variation, and he often subverted racist evolutionary arguments through highlighting the resiliency of African Americans. He took as an example the experience of the Transatlantic slave trade which he argued acted as a selective pressure and would have led to a genetically stronger population relative to European Americans who did not experience this population bottleneck.

Cobb often used his expertise in anatomy and biology in order to combat racist explanations for perceived differences between African Americans and European Americans. One of the most widely cited studies in this effort was Cobb's "Race and Runners," published in 1936. In this work, Cobb took the case of Jesse Owens to dispel the idea that his success as a quadruple gold medal winner could be explained by his " African-American genes," an argument that stemmed from the idea that Black people were stronger and more athletic than whites at the cost of decreased intelligence. Proponents of this idea often pointed to the supposed existence of extra musculature or differences in nerve thicknesses that allowed African-American athletes to excel relative to European Americans. Cobb addressed this question by surveying the anatomical characteristics of Owens as well as other prominent African Americans in different sports. Cobb demonstrated that not only could their successes not be explained by a shared racial trait, the physiology that would make a superior athlete in one sport would be very different from another. Instead, Cobb accounted for the achievements of African-American athletes relative to European Americans in sports as due to "training and incentive" rather than any "special physical endowment".

During the latter years of his career, Cobb took a more philosophical approach to his anatomical perspective of humanity. He often used biological metaphors to point to key issues within society. Cobb's most prominent philosophical contribution was arguably his 1975 publication, "An anatomist's view of human relations. Homo sanguinis versus Homo sapiens--mankind's present dilemma". This work focused primarily on the fundamental conflict in human nature he described as being between the civilized people suggested by our binomial designation Homo sapiens ("Man the Wise") and the much older and violent organism he described via his coined term Homo sanguinus ("Man the bloody"). Cobb described the recent "adaptations" of civilization and ethics as similar to recently evolved anatomical traits like bipedalism, a key human trait which has nonetheless resulted in a host of health conditions due to our lineage's adaptations for quadrupedal locomotion. Cobb argued that man the wise is up against the ancient evolutionary tradition of man as a "bloody, predatory primate" and that this history of violence and hatred will thus be difficult to overcome. Cobb's final presented publication in 1988, "Human Variation: Informing the Public," applied his Homo sanguinus more closely to the rapid cultural change of the late 20th century. Cobb saw this period of rapid development as both a key opportunity for continued progress against racism and other forms of inequality and a potential for such issues to become more firmly embedded within the system of the society: "Just as an embryological defect cannot be corrected, so our mammoth construction programs can be wrong, which is not obvious until it is too late."

== Legacy ==
Cobb distinguished himself by representing the pursuit of social responsibility in the field of anthropology, as well as by being an activist scholar who often applied anthropological methods to issues of racism and inequality. He undertook studies within the scope of his expertise in anatomy that aimed at disproving racist explanations for social difference. He believed that scholars must take responsibility "not only for their own thoughts and actions but also for their own society" because the values that are expressed in scientific work, whether subtly or overtly, are key in the shaping of culture and society. He was one of the first anthropologists to undertake a demographic analysis that illustrated the consequences of segregation and racism on the African-American population, and he wanted to create the resources so he would not be the last. One of Cobb's greatest contributions to this end is the expansive skeletal collection he curated during his time at Howard University which is now housed at the university's W. Montague Cobb Research Laboratory, a research laboratory led by biological anthropologist Fatimah Jackson that also houses the New York African Burial Ground collection.

Cobb was long involved in African descendants' struggle for freedom, justice, and equality. He assumed a number of roles in African-American-led organizations, including the National Urban League and the Association for the Study of Negro Life and History, and he was a longtime editor of the first African-American medical journal, the Journal of the National Medical Association. He was a member of the board of directors for the NAACP from 1949 until his death and president from 1976 to 1982. Cobb played a key role in efforts to expand access to medical care through his active leadership in the National Medical Association, and this activism led to his testimony to congress during the hearings leading up to the passage of Medicare and Medicaid in 1965. He was present at the signing of this bill into law by invitation of President Lyndon B. Johnson.

During his lifetime, Cobb was honored by more than 100 organizations for his efforts as a scholar and as an activist, including the American Association for Anatomy's highest award, the Henry Gray Award, which he received for his outstanding contributions in the field in 1980. He was also the recipient of the U.S. Navy's Distinguished Public Service Award and received honorary doctorates from several institutions, including the Medical College of Wisconsin, Georgetown University, the University of the Witwatersrand, Morgan State University, Howard University, and Amherst College. The American Association for Anatomy named the W.M. Cobb Award in Morphological Sciences after Cobb to honor his legacy with its first recipient in 2020.

== Selected publications ==
- "Human Archives" – 1932.
- "Race and Runners" –1936.
- "Cranio Facial Union of Man" – 1940.
- "The Cranio-Facial Union and the Maxillary Tuber in Mammals" – 1943.
- "Medical Care and the Plight of the Negro in Medicine" – 1947.
- "An anatomist's view of human relations. Homo sanguinis versus Homo sapiens--mankind's present dilemma" – 1975.
- "Human Rights—A New Fight in Cultural Evolution" – 1978.
- "The Black American in Medicine" – 1981.
- "Human Variation: Informing the Public" – 1988.

In addition those listed above, Cobb had more than 1100 publications on various topics.

== See also ==
- List of African-American pioneers in desegregation of higher education
- Manet Helen Fowler
