= National Medical Association =

Organization for African American physicians

- Formation: 1895
- Headquarters: Silver Spring, Maryland
- Location: United States
- Members: African American Physicians
- Official language: English
- President: Roger A. Mitchell, MD
- Website: www.nmanet.org

The National Medical Association (NMA) is the largest and oldest organization representing African American physicians and their patients in the United States. As a 501(c)(3) national professional and scientific organization, the NMA represents the interests of over 30,000 African American physicians and their patients, with nearly 112 affiliated societies throughout the nation and U.S. territories. Through its membership, professional growth, community health education, advocacy, research, and collaborations with public and private organizations, the organization is dedicated to enhancing the quality of health among minorities and underprivileged people. Throughout its history, the NMA has primarily focused on health issues related to African Americans and medically underserved populations. However, its principles, goals, initiatives, and philosophy encompass all ethnic groups

Conceived in no spirit of racial exclusiveness, fostering no ethnic antagonism, but born of the exigencies of the American environment, the National Medical Association has for its object the banding together for mutual cooperation and helpfulness, the men and women of African descent who are legally and honorably engaged in the practice of the cognate professions of medicine, surgery, pharmacy and dentistry.
— C.V. Roman, M.D. NMA Founding Member and First Editor of the Journal of the National Medical Association (NMA) 1908

== History ==
During the Jim Crow era in the southern part of the United States, state laws and social customs mandated the racial segregation of medical societies, medical facilities, and medical education. The NMA was organized by twelve black doctors attending the Cotton States and International Exposition in Atlanta, Georgia. The first president was Robert F. Boyd, and Daniel Hale Williams served as the vice president.

=== National health insurance ===
The NMA, dedicated to promoting the interests of those of "African Descent", contributed to the national health insurance dialogue from 1900 to 1950. Despite its rather marginal size, starting in the mid-1910s, the NMA advocated compulsory health insurance. Primarily, the association sought any means that provided medical care for African Americans. As an association, however, it also sought to promote the interests of the African American physicians themselves.

From the mid-1910s to the late 1940s, the American Medical Association (AMA) acted as the mainstream medical profession's voice. Yet numerous African American doctors were unable to join the AMA due to the lack of county medical societies and because of local bigoted practices, thereby limiting the number of African American AMA members. To exacerbate matters further, the NMA's leadership continued to support compulsory health insurance while AMA members largely distanced themselves from such a scheme due to (a) the red scare, (b) the belief in U.S. health superiority to other nations with national health insurance schemes and (c) the argument that national health insurance would potentially ruin the "sacred" practitioner-patient relationship. Struggling between providing medical care for African Americans as well as maintaining the voice of African American physicians, the NMA was internally divided on these issues from the late 1930s-early 1950s.

During this time period, the NMA leadership repeatedly stated their support for a national health insurance scheme through the Journal of the National Medical Association as well as newspapers like the Chicago Defender. At the same time, rank-and-file members, desirous to practice medicine, supported the AMA's proposals. Indeed, during the height of the health insurance debates from 1946 to 1950, the AMA often sent guest speakers to the NMA's conferences. Such AMA officials promised the NMA membership in their ranks as well as the right to practice medicine. Yet the NMA's leadership largely resisted the AMA's efforts. NMA presidents like Drs. E. L. Robinson, C. Austin Whitter and J. G. Gathings opposed the AMA's proposals on the grounds that the AMA had previously excluded African American patients from their care as well as African American physicians from their ranks. Furthermore, the AMA's support of Abraham Flexner's Report of 1910 witnessed the closure of numerous African American and women's hospitals across the country. How could, the NMA leadership argued, African American doctors support the AMA when the AMA was, in fact, the origin of some of African American's most severe issues (indeed, NMA member Dr. Cobb compared the AMA's tactics to the KKK during 1946–50).

By the early 1950s, the NMA still did not possess a consensual platform concerning health insurance. Internally torn about the best methods to promote their own professional ambitions as well as the interests of African American patients, the health insurance topic remained a divisive one. Still, members of the NMA offered resistance to the AMA's promotion of voluntary health insurance when few medical practitioners dared to.

In the late 1950s, the NMA took a more active interest in civil rights under the leadership of its president, T. R. M. Howard, a surgeon from Mississippi. In the months after his election as president, Howard had played a key role in the search for evidence and witnesses in the Emmett Till murder case and led the largest civil rights organization in the state, the Regional Council of Negro Leadership. In 1957, under his leadership, the NMA organized the Imhotep National Conference on Hospital Integration which publicized and challenged continuing hospital segregation in both the North and South.

== NMA Convention and Scientific Assembly ==
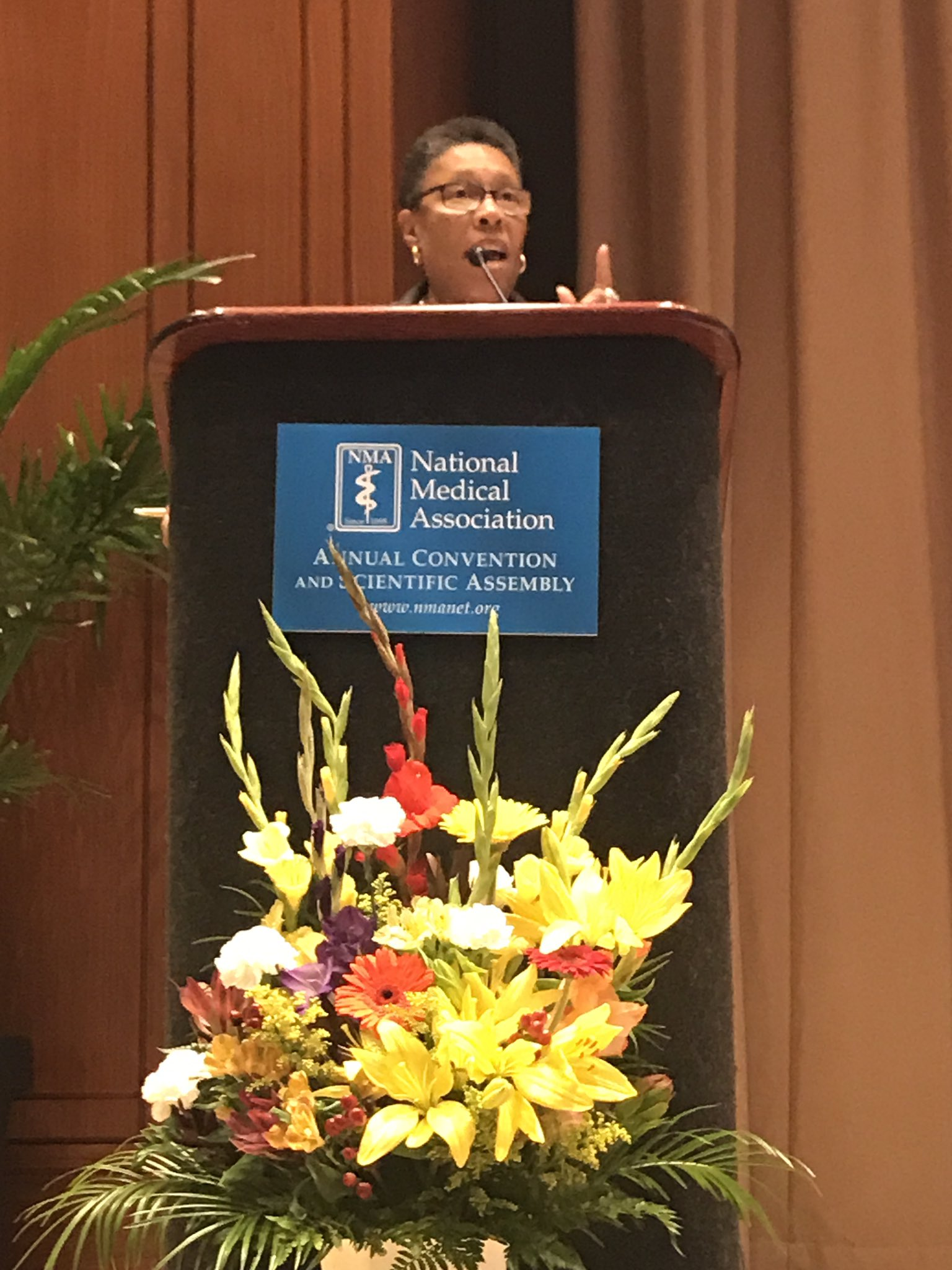
Marcia Fudge speaking at the 2017 annual NMA conference

Nearly every year since its founding in 1895, the NMA has held the Annual Convention & Scientific Assembly, which is regarded as the nation's foremost forum on medical science and African American health. The NMA is accredited by the Accreditation Council for Continuing Medical Education to sponsor continuing medical education.

Through the presentation of CME programs at the national and regional conventions, as well as at state and local society meetings, NMA members are able to meet Category 1 requirements for the Physician's Achievement Award of the NMA and the Physician's Recognition Award of the American Medical Association (AMA). The NMA offers CME programs in 23 specialties—from aerospace medicine to urology.

== Program awareness ==
The NMA has conducted national consumer awareness programs in cancer, women's health, radon, secondhand smoke, smoking cessation and immunizations. Further, the work of the NMA and its members has received national exposure on NBC, ABC, FOX and CNN television stations, as well as numerous radio and major print media each year.

== Journal of the National Medical Association ==
The official journal of the National Medical Association, Journal of the National Medical Association, began publication in 1908 soon after the founding of the NMA with C. V. Roman as first editor. Currently under the leadership of Editor-in-Chief Edith P. Mitchell, MD, MACP, FCPP, it is a peer-reviewed publication whose purpose is to address medical care disparities of persons of African descent.

== List of presidents ==
1. Robert F. Boyd (1895 to 1898)
2. H. T. Noel (1895 to 1900)
3. O. D. Porter (1901 to 1902)
4. F. A. Stewart (1903)
5. Charles Victor Roman (1904)
6. John E. Hunter (1905)
7. R. E. Jones (1906)
8. Nathan Francis Mossell (1907)
9. W. H. Wright (1908)
10. P. A. Johnson (1909)
11. Marcus F. Wheatland (1910)
12. Austin M. Curtis (1911)
13. H. F. Gamble (1912)
14. John A. Kenney (1913)
15. A. M. Brown (1914)
16. F. S. Hargraves (1915)
17. Ulysses Grant Dailey (1916)
18. D. W. Byrd (1917)
19. George W. Cabaniss (1918)
20. D. A. Ferguson (1919)
21. J. W. Jones (1920)
22. John P. Turner (1921)
23. Henry Morgan Green (1922)
24. J. Edward Perry (1923)
25. John O. Plummer (1924)
26. Michael Q. Dumas (1925)
27. Walter G. Alexander (1926)
28. Carl G. Roberts (1927)
29. C. V. Freeman (1928)
30. Thomas Spotuas Burwell (1929)
31. L. A. West (1930)
32. W. H. Higgins (1931)
33. Peter Marshall Murray (1932)
34. C. Hamilton Francis (1933)
35. Midian O. Bousfield (1934)
36. John H. Hale (1935)
37. W. Harry Barnes (1936)
38. Roscoe Conkling Giles (1937)
39. Lyndon M. Hills (1938)
40. George W. Bowles (1939)
41. Albert Woods Dumas (1940)
42. Kenneth W. Clement (1941)
43. Arthur M. Vaughn (1942)
44. Henry Eugene Lee (1943)
45. T. Manuel Smith (1944–1945)
46. Emory I. Robinson (1946)
47. Walter M. Young (1947)
48. J.A.C. Larrimore (1948)
49. C. Austin Whittier (1949)
50. C. Herbert Marshall (1950)
51. Henry H. Walker (1951)
52. Joseph G. Gathering (1952)
53. Witter C. Atkinson (1953)
54. Porter Davis (1954)
55. Matthew Walker (1955)
56. A. C. Terrence (1956)
57. T. R. M. Howard (1957)
58. Arthur M. Townsend Jr. (1958)
59. R. Stillman Smith (1959)
60. Edward C. Mazique (1960)
61. James T. Aldrich (1961)
62. Vaughn C. Mason (1962)
63. John A. Kenney Jr. (1963)
64. W. Montague Cobb (1964)
65. Leonidas H. Berry (1965)
66. John L. S. Holloman Jr. (1966)
67. Lionel F. Swann (1967)
68. James M. Whittico Jr. (1968)
69. Julius W. Hill (1969)
70. W. T. Armstrong (1970)
71. Emerson C. Walden Sr. (1971)
72. Edmund C. Casey (1972)
73. Emery L. Rann (1973)
74. Vernal G. Cave (1974)
75. Jasper F. Williams (1975)
76. Arthur H. Coleman (1976)
77. Charles C. Bookert (1977)
78. Jesse B. Barber Jr. (1978)
79. Robert E. Dawson (1979)
80. Vertis R. Thompson (1980)
81. Frank S. Royal Sr. (1981)
82. Robert L. M. Hilliard (1982)
83. Lucius C. Earles III (1983)
84. Phillip M. Smith (1984)
85. Edith Irby Jones (1985)
86. John O. Brown (1986)
87. John M. Joyner (1987)
88. Frank E. Staggers Sr. (1988)
89. Vivian W. Pinn (1989)
90. Charles Johnson (1990)
91. Alma Rose George (1991)
92. Richard O. Butcher (1992)
93. Leonard E. Lawrence (1993)
94. Tracy Matthew Walton Jr. (1994)
95. Yvonnecris Smith Veal (1995)
96. Randall C. Morgan (1996)
97. Nathaniel H. Murdock (1997)
98. Gary C. Dennis (1998)
99. Walter W. Shervington 1999)
100. Javette C. Orgain (1999)
101. Rodney G. Hood (2000)
102. Lucille C. Norville Perez (2001)
103. Laverne Natalie Carroll (2002)
104. Randall W. Maxey (2003)
105. Winston Price (2004)
106. Sandra L. Gadson (2005)
107. Albert W. Morris Jr. (2006)
108. Nelson L. Adams III (2007)
109. Carolyn Barley Britton (2008)
110. Willarda V. Edwards (2009)
111. Leonard Weather Jr. (2010)
112. Cedric M. Bright (2011)
113. Rahn Kennedy Bailey (2012)
114. Michael Lenoir (2013)
115. Lawrence L. Sanders (2014)
116. Edith P. Mitchell (2015)
117. Richard Allen Williams (2016)
118. Doris Browne (2017)
119. Niva Lubin-Johnson (2018)
120. Oliver T. Brooks (2019)
121. Leon McDougle (2020)
122. Rachel Villanueva (2021)
123. Garfield Clunie (2022)
124. Yolanda Lawson (2023)
125. Virginia Caine (2024)
126. Roger A. Mitchell Jr. (2025 to 2026)
