= Charles Shannon =

Charles Shannon may refer to:

- Charles Haslewood Shannon (1865–1937), English artist
- Charles Shannon (artist) (1914–1996), American artist
- Charles Shannon (ice hockey) (1916–1974), American ice hockey player
- Charles E. Shannon Jr. (1943–2005), Massachusetts state senator

== See also ==
- Charles Shannon West (1829–1885), Texas politician
- C. Shannon Mallory (1936–2018), Anglican bishop
- Shannon (surname)
