= Kate Werble Gallery =

Art gallery in New York City

Coordinates: 40°43′16.2″N 74°0′0.2″W

- Established: September 2008
- Location: SoHo, Manhattan, New York City
- Type: Contemporary art gallery
- Director: Kate Werble
- Website: www.katewerblegallery.com

The Kate Werble Gallery is a contemporary fine art gallery open since 2008, located in the SoHo neighborhood of Manhattan, New York.

== History ==
Werble opened the gallery on Vandam Street in West SoHo, Manhattan, in September 2008, just before the financial crisis. At the start, Werble represented a single artist, photographer John Lehr. She focused on group shows for the first two years. According to The New York Times, whereas some galleries only show work from artists they represent, Werble's business model involved hosting shows from other artists as well, which sometimes leads to representation.

The gallery temporarily moved up to a townhouse on East 73rd Street on the Upper East Side for two years in 2019, before moving to a new space on Broadway in SoHo in 2021.

During the COVID-19 pandemic, when art galleries struggled amid lockdowns and uncertainty, Werble launched an art subscription plan whereby collectors would pre-purchase a package of three unique works by represented artists at a flat price, receiving a new work every few weeks. According to Artnet, it brought subscriptions closer to commissioning than programs at other arts organizations, which focused on editions of pre-existing works. The price was set based on a calculation of what would be necessary to pay for the artists' studio costs for a few months of lockdown, selling work at a discounted rate to guarantee income for basic continuity. The model continued to be successful even after art galleries reopened.

== Artists and exhibitions ==
While it focused early on sculpture and performance, with a Minimalist aesthetic, the gallery has since broadened to show work in multiple media. Roberta Smith called a 2015 group exhibition, Quiet Tremors, with abstract works from artists like Ulrike Müller, "group show as trial balloon" as Werble expanded the gallery to include paintings for the first time. Current and former artists represented or exhibited by the gallery include John Lehr, Luke Stettner, Christopher Chiappa, Brock Enright, Melanie Schiff, Lui Shtini, Beth Campbell, Michael Berryhill, Ernesto Burgos, Marilyn Lerner, Anna Betbeze, Gareth Long, Christine Elmo, Peter Halley, Shadi Harouni, Baseera Khan, Cauleen Smith, and Ken Tisa. The New York Times recommended the gallery's 2016 group show, Sexting, as "a light, witty, intermittently philosophical look at a genre of amateur photography that can’t help infiltrating other figurative art". John Yau wrote in Hyperallergic that the diversity of the 2018 group show ROYGBIV was "the kind of show I hope to see more often".

The gallery regularly shows at art fairs like the Art Basel Miami, Frieze Art Fair, and the New Art Dealers Alliance (NADA). In 2010, the gallery's curation of Minimalist works won the "best booth" prize at the NADA. The gallery's booth at Frieze was highlighted by Artnet in 2016 and The New York Times in 2019.
