= Lyells =

Lyells may refer to:

- Lyells, Virginia, unincorporated community
- Ruby Stutts Lyells (1908–1994), American librarian and feminist

== See also ==
- Lyell (disambiguation)
