= John Lehr (photographer) =

American photographer (born 1974)

John Lehr (born 1975 in Baltimore, Maryland) is an American photographer active in New York City.

== About ==
Lehr graduated with a B.F.A. from the Maryland Institute College of Art (MICA) in 1998 and earned his M.F.A. from Yale University in 2005.

Institutions that have displayed Lehr's art include the Museum of Modern Art, New York; Corcoran Gallery of Art, Washington, D.C.; the Walker Art Center, Minneapolis, Minnesota; Yale University School of Art, New Haven, Connecticut and Yancey Richardson Gallery, New York.

In a review in The Brooklyn Rail of Lehr's work at Kate Werble Gallery in late 2010, Gail Braddock Quagliata writes, "Detached and structured, the images seem free to celebrate the blatant absurdity of all manner of visual signifiers, both intentional and accidental, without the burden of melodrama."

Lehr is Associate Professor in the Photography Department at Pratt Institute. Previously, he was a lecturer in the Photography department of the Yale School of Art since 2005.
