= Blyden Jackson =

American academic and essayist (1910–2000)

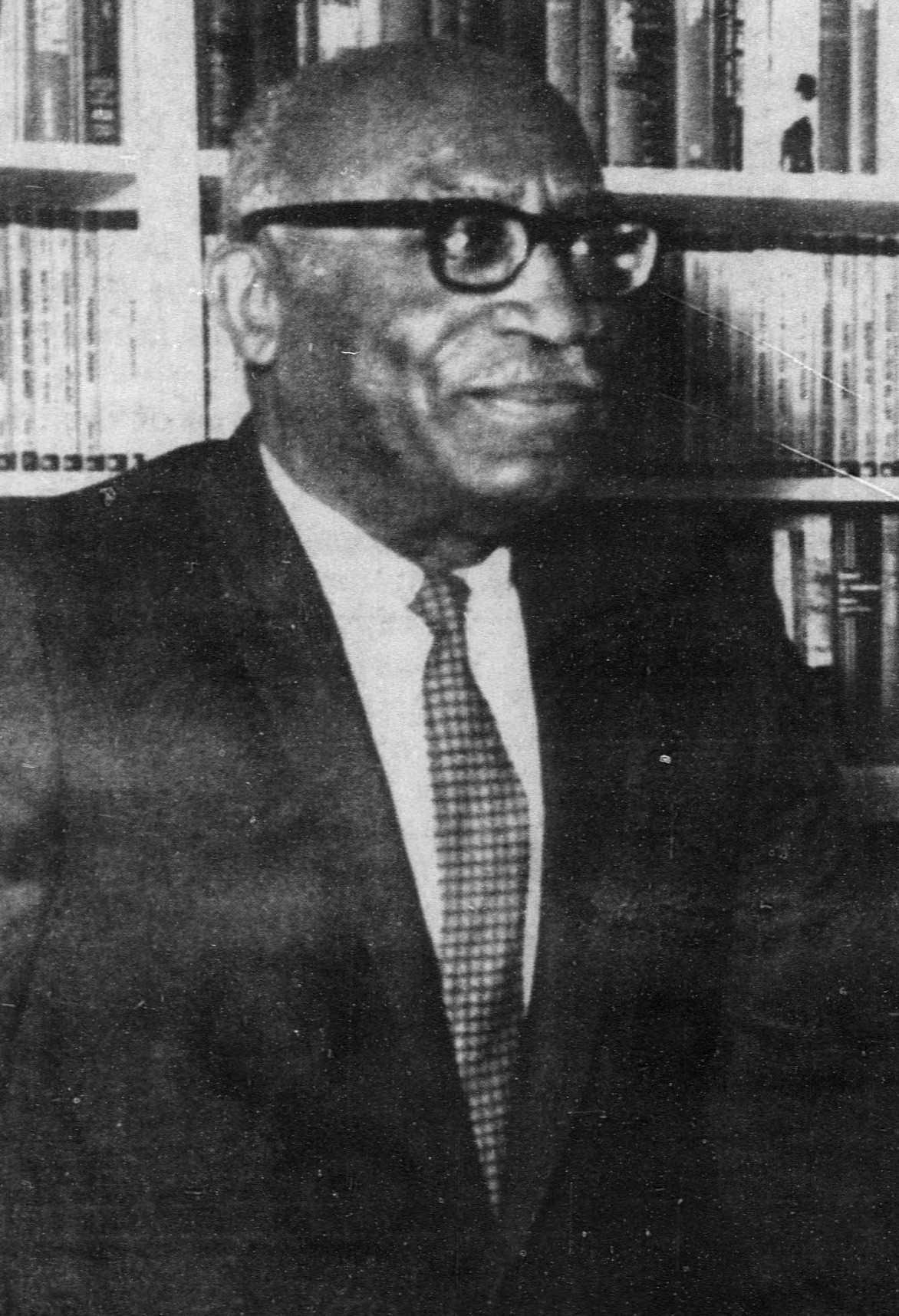
- Jackson, circa 1970
- Born: October 12, 1910; Paducah, Kentucky, U.S.
- Died: May 1, 2000 (aged 89)
- Education: Wilberforce University; University of Michigan
- Occupations: Academic; author; essayist; activist
- Employer: University of North Carolina at Chapel Hill
- Spouse: Roberta Jackson
- Parent(s): George Washington Jackson; Julia Reid

Blyden Jackson (October 12, 1910 – May 1, 2000) was a Black American academic, essayist, and activist.

The grandson of slaves, born in the segregated South, Jackson was the first Black American to become a full professor at the University of North Carolina at Chapel Hill in 1969, and "the first Black American professor at a traditionally white university in the Southeast".

At UNC Chapel Hill, Jackson pioneered the African American Studies program and helped recruit more Black American faculty members. With his wife, he is the namesake of Blyden and Roberta Jackson Hall on campus.

== Early life ==
Blyden Jackson was born on October 12, 1910, in Paducah, Kentucky. His grandparents were slaves. His father, George Washington Jackson, was a history teacher and his mother, Julia Reid, a librarian. He had a brother, Reid E. Jackson Sr., who later became a professor at Morgan State University. He grew up in segregated Louisville.

Jackson graduated from Wilberforce University in 1930. He attended the University of Michigan on a Rosenwald Scholarship, where he earned a master's degree in 1938 and a PhD in 1952.

== Career ==
Jackson taught at Madison Jr. High School in Kentucky from 1934 to 1945. He joined Fisk University, a historically black college, as an assistant professor of English in 1945, and left as a tenured associate professor in 1954. He was a full professor of English at Southern University, another historically black college, from 1954 to 1956, and he later became the dean of its Graduate School.

Jackson joined the English department at the University of North Carolina at Chapel Hill in 1969, where he was the first African-American faculty member to become a full professor. He was also "the first African American professor at a traditionally white university in the Southeast". He was a professor until 1973, when he became an administrator, serving as special assistant to the Dean of the Graduate School until 1981, and Associate Dean until 1983. He pioneered the African-American Studies program at UNC Chapel Hill, where he also served on a committee to hire more African Americans as faculty.

Jackson was the author of several books about African-American literature, including one co-authored with Louis D. Rubin Jr. He wrote about the Harlem Renaissance, including Langston Hughes, Ralph Ellison and Richard Wright.

== Personal life and death ==
Jackson was married to Roberta Jackson, an associate professor of education at UNC Chapel Hill who predeceased him in 1999. The Blyden and Roberta Jackson Graduate Fellowship Fund at UNC Chapel Hill was established in 1989. The Blyden and Roberta Jackson Hall, which houses the Office of Undergraduate Admissions, was named for them in 1992. Jackson died in 2000, at the age of 89.

== Selected works ==
=== Literary criticism ===
- Jackson, Blyden; Rubin, Louis D. Jr. (1974). Black Poetry in America: Two Essays in Historical Interpretation. Baton Rouge, Louisiana: Louisiana State University Press. OCLC 15027889.
- Jackson, Blyden (1976). The Waiting Years: Essays on American Negro Literature. Baton Rouge, Louisiana: Louisiana State University Press. ISBN 9780807101735. OCLC 228772829.
- Jackson, Blyden (1989). A History of Afro-American Literature. Baton Rouge, Louisiana: Louisiana State University Press. ISBN 9780807115114. OCLC 923501433.
