= Winifred Mason =

Caribbean-American jeweler in New York (1912–1993)

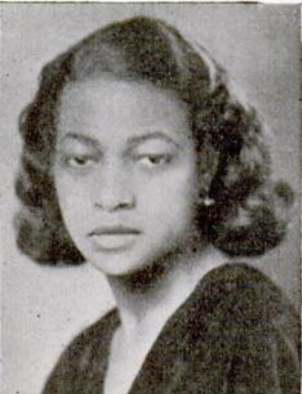
- Mason in 1936
- Born: January 31, 1912; Brooklyn, New York, U.S.
- Died: 1993 (aged 80–81)
- Education: New York University
- Known for: Jeweler, silversmith
- Spouse: Jean E. Chenet

Winifred Mason (January 31, 1912 – 1993) was an African American jeweler who was active in New York during the 1940s. She worked primarily in copper, and was inspired by West Indian cultural traditions. She is believed to be the first commercial Black jeweler in the United States.

Under her married name, Winifred Chenet, she also sold jewelry in Port-au-Prince, Haiti. She escaped from Haiti following the murder of her husband by the Tonton Macoute in 1963, and returned to the United States.

== Early life and background ==
Winifred Mason, was born on January 31, 1912, in Brooklyn, New York.

Mason received a BS in English Literature in 1934, and went on to receive a MA in education from New York University in 1936. In the early 1940s, Mason taught youth metalworking skills at Junior Achievement, where she met Art Smith.

== Career in teaching ==
After graduating, Mason hesitated to begin her career as a teacher, and she worked for a while as a teacher for the WPA and later as a crafts instructor at the Harlem Boys Club, but she chose another way as her life career. Mason received a grant from the Rosenwald Fund to "gather folk material and basic art patterns used by the West Indian Negro and to express these feelings in jewelry." This research included time in Haiti, where she met her husband, Jean Chenet.

== Studio and jewelry ==
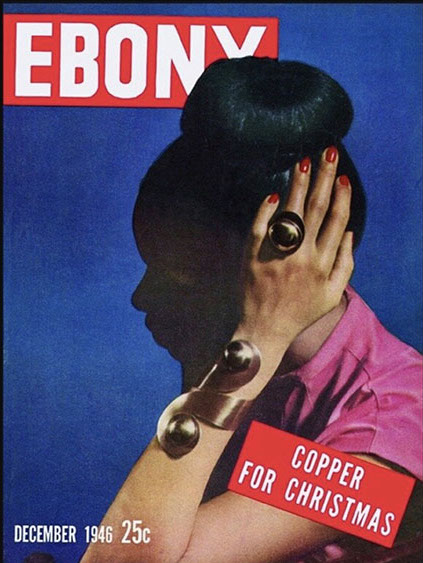
Ebony magazine featured Mason's jewelry in the article "Copper For Christmas", December 1946

Her first piece of jewelry appeared in 1940, and it was a pendant in bronze, copper, and silver. It had to be of great interest among her friends and soon she began to get orders for the similar pieces. Mason never repeated her works and every piece she made was unique. When she could not find a proper instrument to use in her work, she made it herself.

In 1943, she received her first order from an exclusive department store on Fifth Avenue. After working on jewelry at home, Mason opened and maintained a studio in Greenwich Village in the early 1940s. Jewelry from this studio was sold at national department stores like Lord and Taylor. Much of the jewelry was custom-made, and clientele included Billie Holiday. By the late 1940s, there had been ten exhibitions of her jewelry including one-woman shows in Milwaukee, Wisconsin and Port-au-Prince, Haiti.

Among her employees was Art Smith, who went on to found his own studio and become one of the first significant African-American jewelers.

== Haiti and return to the States ==
Mason married Jean E. Chenet in Manhattan, New York, on September 13, 1948. Chenet was born on October 14, 1924, in Port-au-Prince, Haiti. After marrying, Mason spent much of her time in Haiti. Under her married name, Winifred Chenet, she sold "voodoo-inspired" jewelry there. She also operated a store in New York selling Haitian art.

In 1963 her husband was murdered in Haiti by the Tonton Macoute. Winifred Mason Chenet escaped and returned to the United States.

Mason Chenet was later active in championing other female black artists. She was honored by Girls Friends, an organization for black women, in 1990. She had served as a vice president of their Brooklyn chapter in 1939. Mason Chenet died in 1993.
