= Ken Tisa =

American artist

- Born: 1945 (age 80–81); Philadelphia, PA
- Education: Yale School of Art and Architecture (MFA)
- Alma mater: Pratt Institute (BFA)
- Known for: Textile art, assemblage, painting

Ken Tisa is an American artist.

== Early life and education ==
Ken Tisa was born in Philadelphia, PA in 1945. After receiving his BFA from Pratt Institute in 1968, he went on to receive his MFA from Yale School of Art and Architecture in 1971.

== Career ==
Tisa is well known for his beaded and embroidered wall-mounted tapestries. His textile works bear some resemblance to drapo Vodou. Most frequently he creates portraits of a single subject, depicted from the chest up, utilizing glass beads or sequins to compose a form out of contrasting fields of color.

Tisa has also displayed work that is an archive of objects, displayed alongside his work. His 2017 exhibition, Objects/Time/Offerings, at Gordon Robichaux Gallery led to Svetlana Kitto's oral history of Sara Penn's Knobkerry in large part due to Tisa's eclectic display of objects and Penn's influence on his work. The exhibition included an installation of puppets, dolls, masks, ephemera, and collectibles from his personal collection.

=== Public collections ===
Ken Tisa's work is included in the public collections of the La Salle University Art Museum.

A series of artist's books that was made in collaboration with Kenward Elmslie and contains unique drawings by Ken Tisa is included in the National Gallery of Australia.

=== Notable exhibitions ===
Ken Tisa was included in the Whitney Biennial 1975: Contemporary American Art.

Tisa was included in the Museum of Modern Art's 1981 exhibition New York/New Wave. In 1989, his work was included in Witnesses: Against Our Vanishing curated by Nan Goldin at Artists Space. The exhibition was organized in response to the ongoing AIDS epidemic and included work by Vittorio Scarpati, Greer Lankton, and others. The exhibition became the subject of public debate when John E. Frohnmayer, chairman of the National Endowment for the Arts revoked the $10,000 grant awarded to the nonprofit gallery, a decision Frohmayer claimed was due to the overtly political nature of David Wojnarowicz's catalogue essay.

Published in 2021, Tisa was interviewed and discussed prominently in Svetlana Kitto's oral history of Sara Penn's Knobkerry, accompanying an exhibition at SculptureCenter focusing on Penn's legacy and her multipurpose business. Kitto began her oral history after researching a catalogue for Tisa's 2017 exhibition at Gordon Robichaux Gallery, Objects/Time/Offerings. During her research Kitto frequently came across Penn's name and mentions of Knobkerry.

In 2013, Tisa's work was part of a group show at Kate Werble Gallery commemorating Village Voice writer and lesbian separatist, Jill Johnston–the exhibition was titled in the hopes of not being considered.

=== Reception ===
Tisa's work has received critical attention and has been reviewed in Artforum magazine and the New York Times.
