= Mildred Blount =

American milliner

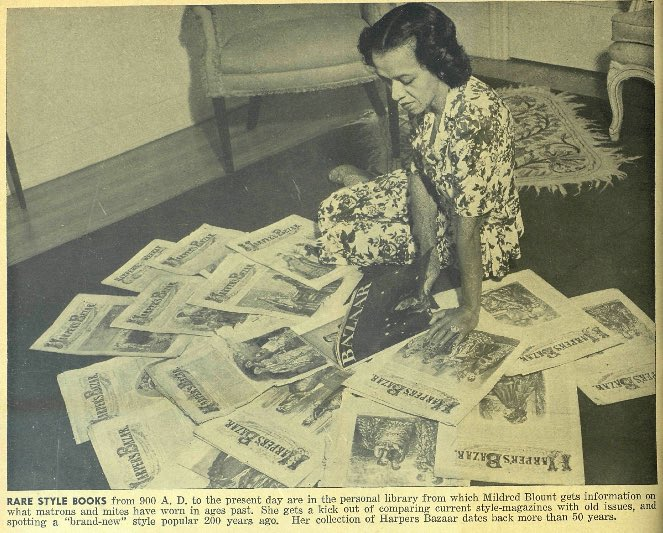
Blount in 1946.

Mildred Blount (1907–1974) was an African-American milliner best known for her creations worn by celebrities, members of high society, and featured in films such as Gone with the Wind.

Her artistic philosophy was: "Make the hat fit the individual." To Blount, "hats … express something- modes, people, stories-," and over her career, she strove to put that message into her work.

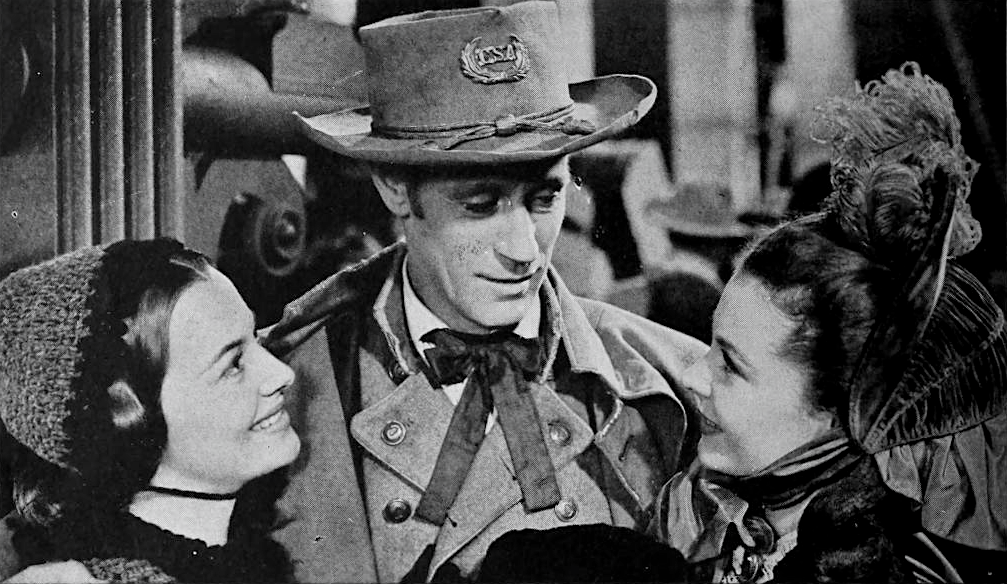
Olivia de Havilland (Left), Leslie Howard (Center) and Vivien Leigh (Right) from Gone With the Wind, 1939. Many hats for the film were designed by Mildred Blount.

== Career ==
Blount's interest in millinery grew out of her time working at Madame Clair's Dress and Hat Shop in New York City. She and her sister, who was a dressmaker, opened their own dress and hat shop aimed at serving wealthy New Yorkers.

After Blount's designs were shown at the 1939 New York World's Fair, her career took off. She was asked to design hats for the films Gone with the Wind and Easter Parade as well as for the cover of the August 1942 Ladies' Home Journal.

In 1943 she received a grant from the Rosenwald Fund which was used to research the history of fashion and enabled her to create historically accurate hats which expanded her design work, which was in high demand. This also enabled her to leave the John-Frederics studio and set up her own business in Beverly Hills, California. Her clients included Joan Crawford, Rosalind Russell, Gloria Vanderbilt, Marian Anderson, and others.

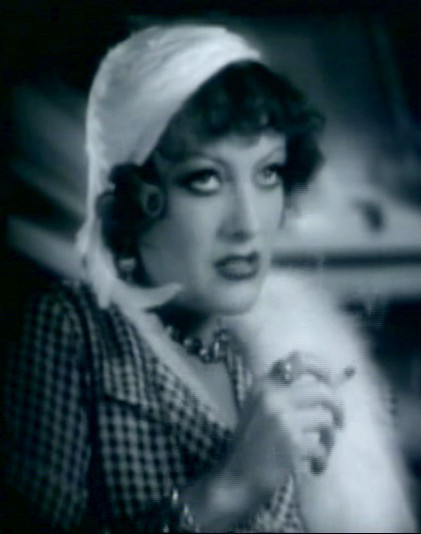
Joan Crawford in Rain. Mildred Blount designed hats for Crawford.

She was the first African American member of the Motion Pictures Costumers Union, which allowed her to work in film studios.

Blount died in 1974 in Los Angeles, California.
