= Sara Penn =

American designer (1927–2020)

- Born: 1927; Pittsburgh, Pennsylvania, U.S.
- Died: 2020 (aged 92–93); New York, New York, U.S.
- Education: Spelman College; Atlanta University

Sara Penn (1927–2020) was an American designer who was the owner of Knobkerry, a clothing and antiques store, gallery, cultural center, and arts space in Downtown Manhattan from the 1960s to the 1990s. Penn designed clothes that utilized global and historical textiles. Many of her clothing display strong African, East and Southeast Asian, and Indigenous American influences. She also maintained and displayed an inventory of art objects from across the globe.

== Biography ==
Sara Penn was born in Pittsburgh to an affluent African American family in 1927. Her great aunt followed Booker T. Washington's urge to provide skilled training for newly freed slaves, teaching quilting and sewing. She opened a training school that grew to have over 200 students. Penn recognizes a closeness with this relative that she attributes her own career to. After attending Spelman College, Penn earned a social work degree from Atlanta University, where she would take a religion class with Martin Luther King Jr. She maintained her career as a social worker part-time even years into Knobkerry's success.

She traveled throughout Europe in the 1950s, living briefly in Paris and Amsterdam. Eventually moving back to New York, she took a job as a social worker and began a romantic relationship with the painter Wolf Kahn. Kahn and Penn were regulars at the Cedar Bar where she met artists like Willem de Kooning, Franz Kline and Joan Mitchell. She began to apprentice at Phyllis Jewelry, a silver store on East 7th Street. Here she would meet not only her future business partners—Fumi Schmidt, a dancer and seamstress who sewed most of the creations and Olive Wong, a theatrical designer who procured textiles for Penn, but also friend and contemporary Art Smith, a jeweler, and Barbara Shaum, a sandal maker whose shop adjoined McSorley's Bar and would eventually become Penn's first shopfront.

== Knobkerry ==
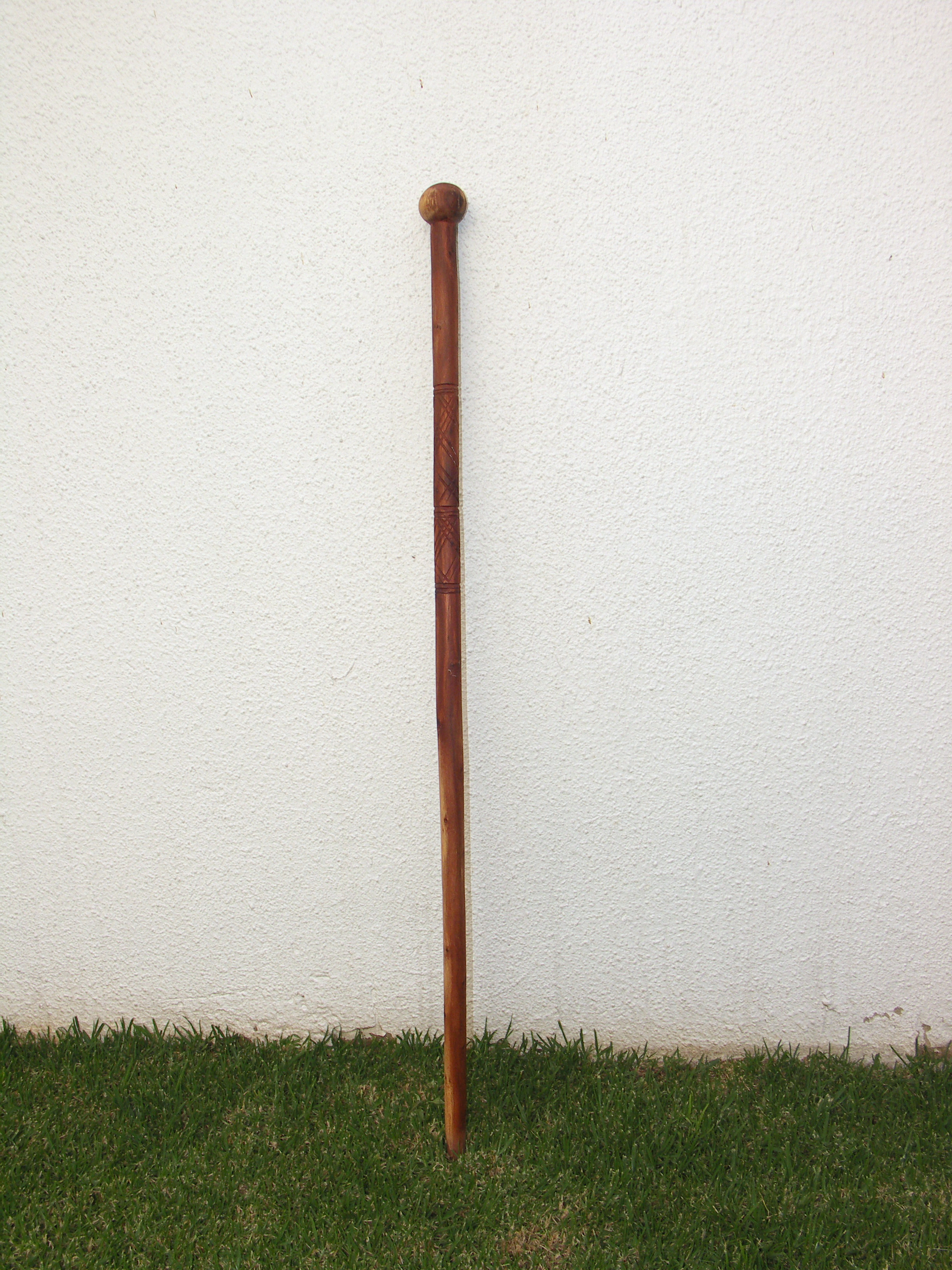
A typical knobkerrie

Her store Knobkerry, was a reference to "The Adventures of the Black Girl in Her Search for God", a 1932 short story by George Bernard Shaw. In the allegorical satire the South African protagonist flees a mission with only her knobkerrie, a Zulu fighting stick. She sets out for God, and anytime she comes across someone who tries to tell her who God is, she simply hits them with her knobkerrie and continues her search. The store changed locations numerous times, and other than a short stint in California, remained generally in Manhattan's Lower East Side.

The store dealt in both ready to wear garments and custom designs. The clothing were created onsite in the backroom of the shop. Alix Grès was cited as an inspiration for their custom gowns. The garments were noted for their utilization of cultural assemblage as well as their ability to be worn by either sex.

Knobkerry was the site of several early exhibitions by American artist David Hammons. Roberta Smith reviewed an exhibition of Hammons work at Knobkerry's TriBeCa location – describing how Hammons combined the inventory of Knobkerry and some of his own work to create a constantly shifting sculptural installation. Many works created by Hammons for this exhibition only existed for the duration of the exhibition. One piece, titled Carpet Beater, was an adorned Kilim rug with two dozen drumsticks. Another was a deflated basketball filled with rice, placed atop a tiny lounge chair with chewing gum on its underside, all placed within a glass case with shelves holding Japanese dolls, Indian bronzes, and wood or iron African figurines. Moving water was connected to the orifices of African masks to become small scale, functioning fountains. Also featured was a group portrait of a Black family, partially obscured by a hanging kimono. A small Shinto shrine was encircled with black-eyed peas. This was the first time Hammons staged his Freudian Slip, a piece of lacy lingerie draped over a Yoruban Gẹlẹdẹ mask. The show's existence was spread exclusively by word-of-mouth. This exhibition was a perfect fit for Penn's store, whose trademark clothing had always been a patchwork of culturally specific textiles.

Among numerous other publications, her designs were notably featured on the covers of Esquire and The Saturday Evening Post, as well as several Virginia Slims ad campaigns featuring Beverly Johnson for Essence in 1977, and for Jet in 1975.

It has been speculated (though never confirmed) that Yves Saint Laurent, a frequent customer of Knobkerry, was influenced by Penn's designs for his Spring/Summer 1967 collection.

Designs from Knobkerry utilizing Pakistani textiles were sold in the museum shop to accompany a 1969 exhibition of Pakistani craftwork at the Smithsonian Institution Arts and Industries Building.

Knobkerry officially closed its doors in 1998.

== Oral history ==
Svetlana Kitto compiled an oral history of Sara Penn and Knobkerry after researching a catalogue for Ken Tisa's exhibition at Gordon Robichaux Gallery, where she repeatedly came across Penn's name and mentions of Knobkerry. This oral history was ultimately compiled for a 2021 exhibition at SculptureCenter–curated by interim director Kyle Dancewicz and including sculptures by Niloufar Emamifar and SoiL Thornton.
