= Art Smith (jeweler) =

Cuban-born American jeweler

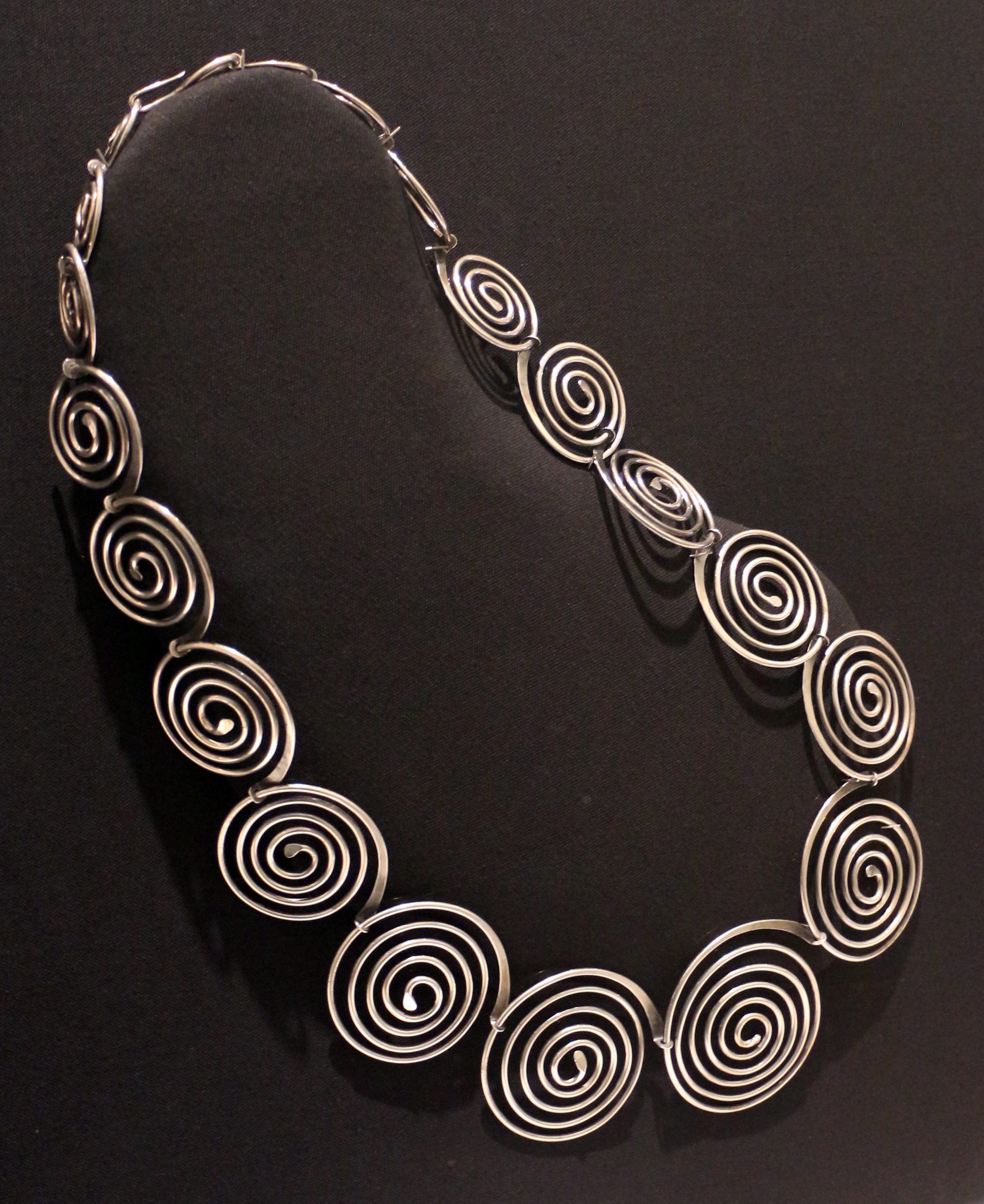
Spiral necklace, 1958 ca.

Arthur George "Art" Smith (1917–1982) was one of the leading modernist jewelers of the mid-20th century, and one of the few Afro-Caribbean people working in the field to reach international recognition. He trained at Cooper Union, NYU, and under Winifred Mason.

== Style ==
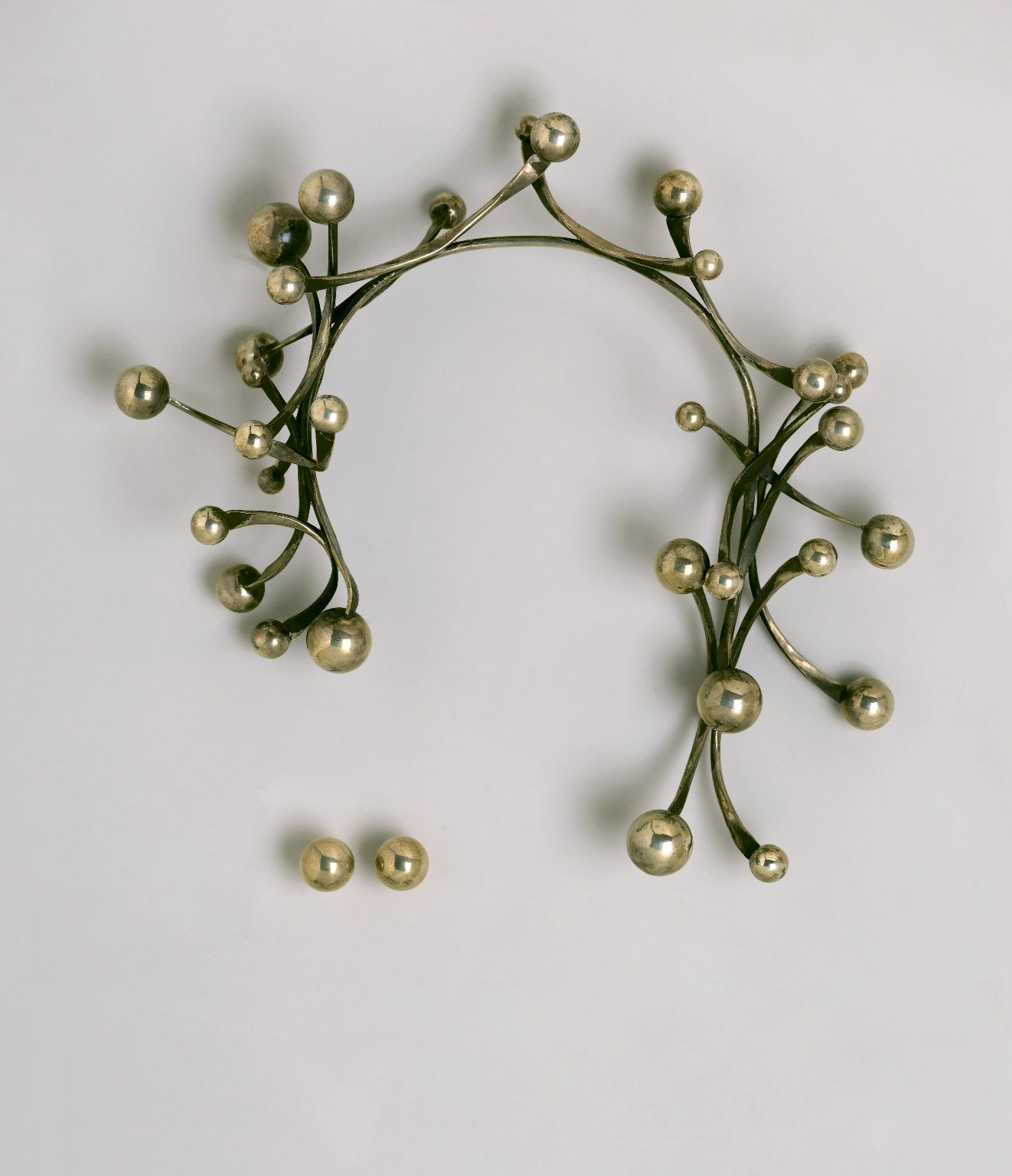
Galaxy Necklace, ca. 1962, from the collection of the Brooklyn Museum

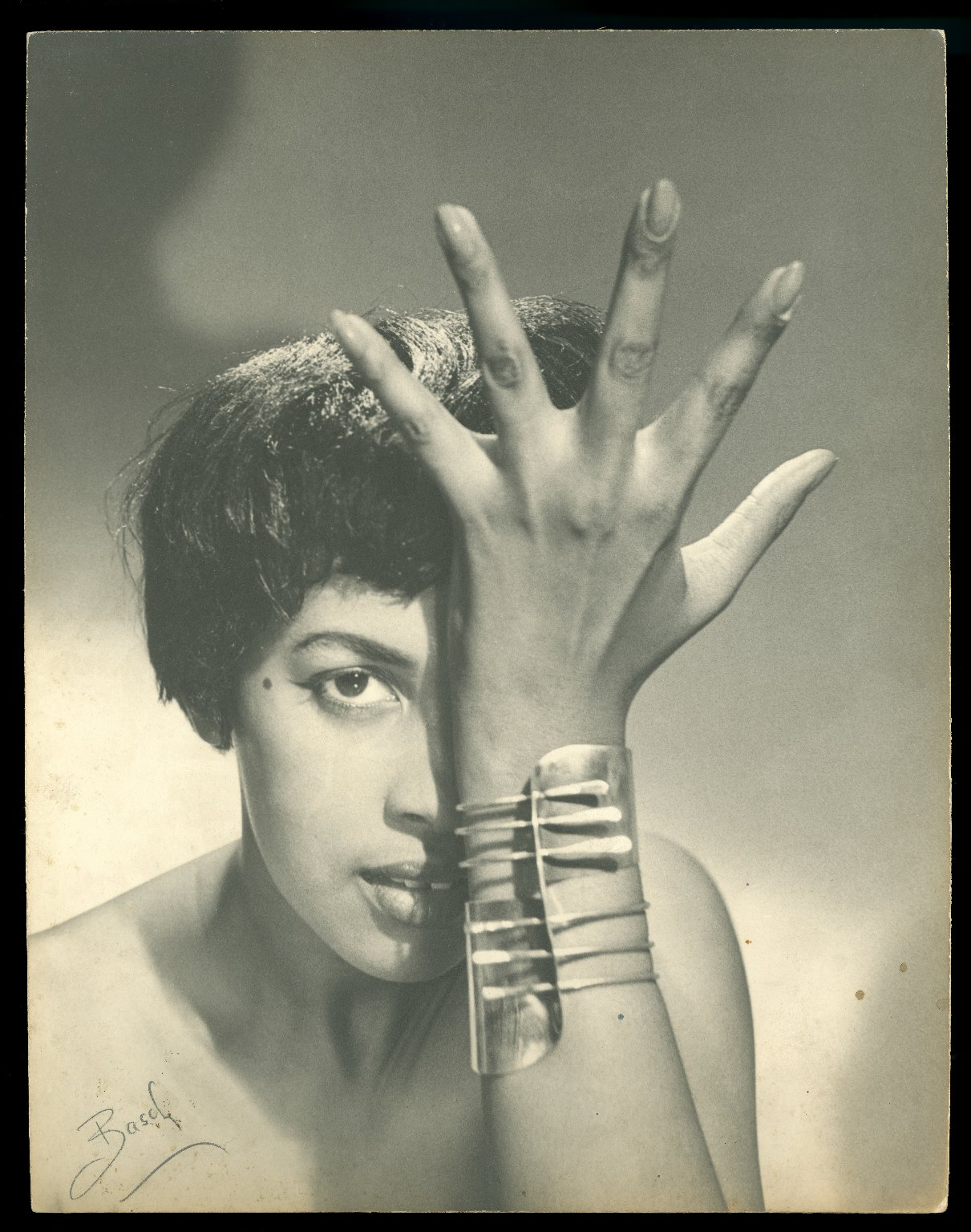
Model wearing a Smith bracelet designed c. 1948

Smith's jewelry has been described as:

Inspired by surrealism, biomorphicism, and primitivism ... dynamic in its size and form.

Many of his pieces were designed to be worn by avant-garde dancers, which influenced his style. The pieces were often large. Of his own work, he said:

A piece of jewelry is in a sense an object that is not complete in itself. Jewelry is a ‘what is it?’ until you relate it to the body. The body is a component in design just as air and space are. Like line, form, and color, the body is a material to work with. It is one of the basic inspirations in creating form.

Alexander Calder was also an influence. Smith was friend and contemporary to many in the downtown New York City arts and fashion scene, such as sandal maker Barbara Shaum and Knobkerry's Sara Penn.

== Biography ==
Smith was born in Cuba, after his parents emigrated there from Jamaica. They moved to New York City when he was three years old.

As an adult, Smith worked in Manhattan's Greenwich Village, running a shop there from 1946 until 1979 (shortly before his death). Smith was a gay Afro-Caribbean, and as a result was subject to attacks shortly after his store opened. A fan of jazz and modern dance, he was personally acquainted with musicians of the period including Lena Horne, Harry Belafonte, Eartha Kitt, Talley Beatty, and Duke Ellington.

Smith died in 1982 of heart disease.

== Exhibitions and holdings ==
During his life, Smith's work was featured in Vogue and Harper's Bazaar, and exhibited at the Museum of Contemporary Crafts. Posthumously, Smith's work was the subject of an exhibition at the Brooklyn Museum in 2008-2011, and is held in the permanent collection of the Cooper Hewitt Museum, Museum of Art and Design, and Boston Museum of Fine Arts. His papers and several of his pieces are part of the permanent collection and main galleries at the National Museum of African American History and Culture.

One piece of Smith's sold for $22,000, and a cufflink collector told the New York Times that Smith's cufflinks were the most expensive pieces in his collection.
