= William Samuel Quinland =

William Samuel Quinland (October 12, 1885 – April 6, 1953) was an American pathologist. He was the first African-American to be admitted to the American Association of Pathologists and Bacteriologists and to the American Board of Pathology.

== Life ==
Quinland was born in All Saints, Antigua, British West Indies. He taught briefly at his elementary school, then moved to the Panama Canal Zone. He worked at Ancon Hospital, then at Hospital da Candelária in Brazil, before immigrating to the United States in 1914, where he initially matriculated at Howard University.

In 1918, he earned a B.S. from Oskaloosa College, and in 1919 an M.D. from Meharry Medical College in Nashville. From 1919 through 1921, he was the first African-American to receive a fellowship from the Rosenwald Fund. The fund sponsored his education at Harvard University, where he eventually earned a postgraduate certificate in pathology and bacteriology. Harvard Medical School offered Quinland a professorship, but he rejected their offer, saying that Meharry had a greater need for doctors. He worked and taught at Meharry for twenty-five years (with a two-year gap studying at the University of Chicago in 1941–2) before moving in 1947 to Tuskegee Veterans Hospital.

In 1937, he was admitted to the American Association of Pathologists and Bacteriologists and the American Board of Pathology, becoming the first African-American to be accredited by either organization.

In 1947, he was the first African-American to be named a Fellow of the College of American Pathologists. Also in this year, he received a commendation from Opportunity: A Journal of Negro Life. He was an editor of the Journal of the National Medical Association and of the Punjab Medical Journal. His funeral attracted too many mourners for his own black church and was held at Christ Church Cathedral, reportedly only the second time that a funeral for an African-American was held at a white church in the city of Nashville.

From Quinland's death in 1953 through roughly 1985, Lincoln University awarded an annual Quinland Prize in Biology. From roughly 1971 through 2001, Meharry awarded an annual W.S. Quinland Prize in Pathology.

== See also ==
- List of African-American firsts
