= Rosenwald Fund =

Established in 1917 by Julius Rosenwald and his family for "the well-being of mankind".

The Rosenwald Fund (also known as the Rosenwald Foundation, the Julius Rosenwald Fund, and the Julius Rosenwald Foundation) was established in 1917 by Julius Rosenwald and his family for "the well-being of mankind".

The fund donated a total of $70 million dollars, the equivalent of almost $1 billion in 2026 dollars.

It funded public schools especially in rural areas as well as colleges and universities, libraries, museums, Jewish charities, and African American institutions.

The Rosenwald Fund also gave 999 fellowships to African-Americans, spanning the arts, sciences, and scholarship. The Fund also supported 538 southern Whites who were working to improve race relations and social justice.

According to the Fisk University Library Archives it had a large historical impact on the generation before civil rights and played a major role in bolstering the careers of black artists, authors, and scholars during the period of Jim Crow segregation and the Great Depression. Many of the fellowship recipients became leaders of the civil rights movement and contributed significantly to the landmark Supreme Court case against segregation of public schools, Brown vs Board of Education.

Rosenwald, who was president of Sears, Roebuck and Company from 1908 to 1922, and chairman of its board of directors until his death in 1932, had a unique approach (then considered innovative) to philanthropy: "matching grants" were intended to increase local commitment to projects, so the fund required that local communities raise matching funds/ and or labor to the schools. The “give while you live" approach stipulated that the Rosenwald Fund terminate within 25 years of his death (1932). Its funds were depleted in 1948.

== History ==
=== Rosenwald Schools – school building program ===
Teachers in front of a Rosenwald School, 1916

The rural school building program for African-American children was one of the largest programs administered by the Rosenwald Fund. Over $4.4 million in matching funds stimulated construction of more than 5,000 one-room schools (and larger ones), as well as shops and teachers' homes, mostly in the South, where public schools were segregated and black schools had been chronically underfunded. This was particularly so after disenfranchisement of most blacks from the political system in southern states at the turn of the 20th century. The Fund required white school boards to agree to operate such schools and to arrange for matching funds, in addition to requiring black communities to raise funds or donate property and labor to construct the schools. These schools, constructed to models designed by architects of Tuskegee Normal and Industrial Institute (now known as Tuskegee University), became known as "Rosenwald Schools." In some communities, surviving structures have been preserved and recognized as landmarks for their historical character and social significance. The National Trust for Historic Preservation has classified them as National Treasures.

Two exhibits at the National Building Museum in Washington, DC highlight this impact. One exhibition is entitled, "A Better Life for Their Children: Julius Rosenwald, Booker T. Washington, and the 4,978 Schools that Changed America." The second entitled: "The Tuskegee Chapel: Paul Rudolph x Fry & Welch" discusses the Rosenwald Schools within a broader context of the influence of education and architecture influenced Black community and history.

=== Rosenwald library programs ===
The Fund also provided for library programs from the late 1920s into the 1940s. These programs supplied book collections to rural schools, supported college libraries, helped train Black librarians, and funded county library demonstrations aimed at extending service (often on a biracial basis) in the South.

From 1929–1930 to 1935 the Fund put about $500,000 into eleven county libraries in seven Southern states. Equal service was not achieved. Collections available to African Americans were far smaller on a per-capita basis, branches and hours were fewer, and no county developed a fully satisfactory system of distribution to Black readers.

Professional training for Black librarians was concentrated at the Hampton Institute Library School in Virginia (1925–1939). The Carnegie Corporation, the General Education Board, and the Rosenwald Fund all backed Hampton specifically for African American students; it graduated roughly 180 librarians before it closed.

Assessments of the program at the time were conducted by Tommie Dora Barker, the American Library Association regional field agent for the South.

A history of the Fund’s library program covering the 10,000 school, college, and public libraries supported, library-science training for African American librarians, and the push for local tax support, by Aisha M. Johnson-Jones, The African American Struggle for Library Equality: The Untold Story of the Julius Rosenwald Fund Library Program, was published in 2019.

=== Rosenwald Fellowships ===
The Rosenwald Fund invested $1,655,000 in fellowship grants directly to African-American artists, writers, researchers and intellectuals as well as promising white Southerners between 1928 and 1948. (Prior to this, William Samuel Quinland was funded in 1919.) Civil rights leader Julian Bond, whose father received a Rosenwald fellowship, called the list of grantees a "Who's Who of black America in the 1930s and 1940s". Close to one thousand grants were disbursed to Black artists, writers and other cultural figures, many of whom became prominent or already were, including photographers Gordon Parks, Elizabeth Catlett, Marion Palfi, poets Claude McKay, Dr. Charles Drew, Augusta Savage, anthropologist and dancer Katherine Dunham, singer Marian Anderson, silversmith Winifred Mason, writers Ralph Ellison, W. E. B. Du Bois, James Weldon Johnson, psychologists Kenneth and Mamie Clark, dermatologist Theodore K. Lawless, and poets Langston Hughes and Rita Dove. 538 fellowhips were granted to white southerners. Fellowships of between $1,000 to $2,000 were given out yearly to applicants and were usually designed to be open-ended; the Foundation requested but did not require grantees to report back on what they accomplished with the support.

==== Women of Rosenwald: Curating Social Justice, 1928–1948 ====
The Fisk University library sponsors a digital exhibit, "Women of Rosenwald: Curating Social Justice, 1928-1948", to mark the milestones of black female artists who received Rosenwald fellowships. Many of these recipients would become the first African Americans to receive recognition within their various fields. Marian Anderson was the first African American to perform with the New York Metropolitan Opera. Mildred Blount became the first African American member of the Motion Pictures Customer Union. Lenora G. Lafayette was the first African American singer to perform in an English opera house.

=== Syphilis treatment pilot program ===
In 1929, the Rosenwald Fund funded a syphilis treatment pilot program in five Southern states. The Rosenwald project emphasized locating people with syphilis and treating them, during a time when syphilis was widespread in poor African-American communities. The Fund ended its involvement in 1932, due to lack of matching state funds (the Fund required jurisdictions to contribute to efforts to increase collaboration on solving problems). After the Fund ceased its involvement, the federal government decided to take over the funding and changed its mission to being a non-therapeutic study. The infamous Tuskegee syphilis study began later that year, tracking the progress of untreated disease, and took advantage of poor participants by not informing them fully of its constraints. Even after penicillin became recognized as approved treatment for this disease, researchers did not treat the study participants.

Unlike other endowed foundations, which were designed to fund themselves in perpetuity, the Rosenwald Fund was designed to expend all of its funds for philanthropic purposes before a predetermined "sunset date." It donated over $70 million to public schools, colleges and universities, museums, Jewish charities, and African American institutions before funds were completely depleted in 1948.

== Notable fellowship recipients ==
This is a selected list of notable Rosenwald Fund Fellowship recipients from the years the fund's fellowship program was active, 1928-1948. A full list can be found in the appendix of A Force for Change and the Julius Rosenwald Fund and also in Investment in People by E R Embree.

=== 1928 ===
- James Weldon Johnson, writer and activist; returning fellow 1930-1931

=== 1929 ===
- Frances Davis, nurse and activist
- Abram Lincoln Harris, economist; returning fellow 1939, 1945
- Willis J. King, Methodist bishop, college president, and sociologist
- Flemmie Pansy Kittrell, nutritionist
- Ruby Stutts Lyells, librarian
- Augusta Savage, sculptor; 1929-1931 fellowship
- Julian Steele, social worker, politician, and activist; 1929-1930 fellowship
- Clarence Cameron White, composer and violinist; 1929-1931 fellowship

=== 1930 ===
- Franz Alexander, psychoanalyst; 1930-1932 fellowship
- Marian Anderson, opera singer
- Richmond Barthé, sculptor
- William E. Blatz, developmental psychologist
- William Stanley Braithwaite, writer
- Paul Cornely, physician, public health pioneer, and activist
- Ethel McGhee Davis social worker and university dean
- Mollie E. Dunlap, librarian and bibliographer; 1930-1931 fellowship
- Ruby Elzy, opera singer; 1930-1931 fellowship
- Simon Haley, agricultural scientist
- Charles S. Johnson, sociologist and university president
- Dorothy B. Porter, librarian, bibliographer, and curator; 1930-1931 fellowship, returning fellow 1944
- Carleton Washburne, education reformer
- Monroe Work, sociologist and archivist

=== 1931 ===
- Horace Mann Bond, historian, social scientist, and college administrator; 1931-1932 fellowship
- Ralph Bunche, political scientist and diplomat
- Alan Busby, agricultural scientist
- Mercer Cook, diplomat, writer and translator; returning fellow 1937
- Mabel Byrd, economist and civil rights activist
- John Dollard, psychologist and social scientist
- Charles R. Drew, surgeon and medical researcher
- Louis Israel Dublin, statistician
- W.E.B. Du Bois, sociologist, historian, writer, civil rights activist; returning fellow 1933-1934
- Ruth Anna Fisher, historian and archivist
- Roscoe Conkling Giles, surgeon and physician
- Langston Hughes, poet, activist, novelist and playwright, returning fellow 1941
- Henry A. Hunt, education reformer
- Raphael Lanier, diplomat
- Camille Nickerson, pianist, composer, and musicologist
- William Edouard Scott, painter
- John W. Work III, composer and musicologist; 1931-1932 fellowship

=== 1932 ===
- Wallace A. Battle, education reformer and university founder
- Ambrose Caliver, education reformer
- Allison Davis, anthropologist; returning fellow 1939-1940
- Ellsworth Faris, sociologist

=== 1933 ===
- Margaret Bonds, composer and pianist
- John P. Davis, journalist, lawyer and activist

=== 1934 ===
- Lorenzo Greene, historian; returning fellow 1940
- Percy Lavon Julian, research chemist and pharmaceutical innovator; 1934-1935 fellowship
- Kelly Miller, mathematician, sociologist and writer

=== 1935 ===
- St. Clair Drake, sociologist and anthropologist; 1935-1937 fellowship, returning fellow 1946
- Katherine Dunham, dancer and choreographer; 1935-1936 fellowship
- Zora Neale Hurston, writer, anthropologist and filmmaker
- Claude McKay, writer and poet; returning fellow 1943

=== 1936 ===
- Josephine Wilkins, civil rights activist

=== 1937 ===
- Lewis White Beck, philosopher
- Benjamin A. Botkin, folklorist and writer
- Harmon White Caldwell, lawyer and university president
- John Tyler Caldwell, political scientist and university president; 1937-1938 fellowship
- Horace R. Cayton, Jr., sociologist and writer
- William Schieffelin Claytor, mathematician; 1937-1938 fellowship
- Frank Marshall Davis, writer and labor activist
- Aaron Douglas, painter
- John Hope Franklin, historian; 1937-1938 fellowship
- Margaret Jarman Hagood, sociologist and demographer
- Clinton Everett Knox, diplomat; 1937-1938 fellowship
- James Raymond Lawson, physicist and university president; 1937-1938 fellowship
- Ralph E. McGill, journalist and newspaper publisher
- Benjamin Arthur Quarles, historian; returning fellow 1945
- Bonita H. Valien, sociologist and writer; returning fellow 1939
- Preston Valien, sociologist and writer; returning fellow 1939

=== 1938 ===
- Arna W. Bontemps, poet, writer, and librarian; returning fellow 1942
- John Aubrey Davis, Sr., political scientist and civil rights activist; 1938-1940 fellowship
- Shirley Graham Du Bois, writer, composer, and activist; 1938-1939 fellowship
- Rufus Carrollton Harris, lawyer and university president
- George Duke Humphrey educator and university president
- Lewis Wade Jones, sociologist
- Fred B. Kniffen, geographer and anthropologist
- Ruth Smith Lloyd, anatomist; 1938-1939 fellowship
- James LuValle, chemist and Olympic athlete; 1938-1939 fellowship
- Ira De Augustine Reid, sociologist
- Charles Shannon, artist
- Frank M. Snowden, Jr., historian, classicist, and diplomat
- Howard Swanson, composer; 1938-1939 fellowship
- Joseph T. Taylor, sociologist and university dean

=== 1939 ===
- May Justus, writer, educator, and civil rights activist
- John Whitefield Kendrick, economist
- Lawrence D. Reddick, historian; returning fellow 1945
- Lillian Smith, writer; 1939-1940 fellowship
- Hugh H. Smythe, sociologist, writer, and diplomat; 1939-1940 fellowship
- William Grant Still, composer; 1939-1940 fellowship
- Melvin E. Thompson, politician and governor of Georgia
- Lorenzo Dow Turner, sociolinguist; returning fellow 1940 and 1945

=== 1940 ===
- Charles Alston, artist; 1940–1941 fellowship
- William Attaway, writer
- Paul P. Boswell, physician and politician
- Selma Burke, sculptor
- Robert L. Carter, lawyer, civil rights activist, and US District Court judge
- Kenneth B. Clark, social psychologist
- Mamie P. Clark, social psychologist; 1940–1942 fellowship
- Marion Vera Cuthbert, writer and college dean
- Charles Twitchell Davis, literary critic; 1940–1941 fellowship
- Edwin Adams Davis, historian
- James A. For, archaeologist
- Henry Aaron Hill, chemist; 1940–1941 fellowship
- Jacob Lawrence, painter; 1940–1942 fellowship
- Ulysses Lee, academic
- William J. Trent Jr. economist and civil rights activist
- James A. Washington Jr., civil rights lawyer, university dean, and D.C. Superior Court judge
- Mark Hanna Watkins, linguist and anthropologist
- Eric Williams, historian and first Prime Minister of Trinidad and Tobago; returning fellow in 1942
- C. Vann Woodward, historian

=== 1941 ===
- Cleo W. Blackburn, social scientist and college president
- David Blackwell, mathematician
- Herman Branson, physicist, chemist, and college president
- William Montague Cobb, physician and anthropologist
- Helen Octavia Dickens, physician and writer
- John Henry Faulk, storyteller and radio host; 1941-1942 fellowship
- Cornelius Golightly, teacher, civil rights activist, and education administrator
- Adelaide M. Cromwell, sociologist, historian, and preservationist; returning fellow 1944
- Thomas C. Lea III, artist, writer, and historian
- Mabel Murphy Smythe-Haith, economist, civil rights activist, and diplomat
- Samuel Z. Westerfield, Jr., economist and diplomat
- Bell Wiley, historian
- Gordon Randolph Willey, archaeologist and anthropologist
- Margaret Just Butcher, literary scholar, writer, and civil rights activist; 1941-1942 fellowship

=== 1942 ===
- Thomas Bell, writer
- Sterling Allen Brown, folklorist, poet, and literary critic
- Joseph Delaney, artist
- Owen Dodson, poet, novelist, and playwright
- Wade Ellis, mathematician
- William Fontaine, philosopher
- Thomas Henderson Kerr Jr., composer
- Margaret Morgan Lawrence, psychiatrist and writer
- Arthur S. Link, historian; returning fellow 1944
- Herman H. Long, social scientist and college president
- Jesse W. Markham, economist
- Gordon Parks, photographer, musician, writer, and film director
- Clarence F. Stephens, mathematician
- Charles Henry Thompson, psychologist, writer, and civil rights legal theorist
- Charles Henry Townes, physicist
- Charles White, artist; 1942-1943 fellowship
- J. Ernest Wilkins Jr., nuclear scientist, mechanical engineer and mathematician

=== 1943 ===
- Julian Binford, painter
- Mildred Blount, fashion designer
- Marcus Bruce Christian, poet, writer, and folklorist
- Woody Guthrie, singer-songwriter
- Roi Ottley, journalist
- Thomas Sancton, novelist and journalist; returning fellow 1945, 1947
- Hudson Strode, writer
- Julius H. Taylor, physicist
- Hale Woodruff, artist; 1943-1944 fellowship

=== 1944 ===
- Margaret Bush Wilson, lawyer and activist
- Esther Cooper Jackson, civil rights activist and social worker
- E. Franklin Frazier, sociologist and writer
- Robert Gwathmey, artist
- Chester Himes, writer
- Rayford Logan, historian
- Pauli Murray, lawyer, activist, writer and Episcopal priest
- Margaret Walker, poet and writer

=== 1945 ===
- Conrad Albrizio, painter; 1945-1946 fellowship
- Janet Collins, dancer and choreographer
- Woody Crumbo, artist, musician and dancer
- Dean Dixon, conductor; 1945-1946 fellowship
- Ralph Ellison, novelist and literary critic
- Elizabeth Hardwick, novelist and literary critic
- Winifred Mason, jeweler
- Charles Sebree, painter and playwright
- Kenneth Spencer, opera singer and actor
- Alma Stone Williams, pianist and music teacher

=== 1946 ===
- Evelyn Boyd, mathematician
- Nat Caldwell, journalist
- Elizabeth Catlett, artist; 1946-1947 fellowship
- Clifton O. Dummett, dentist and dental historian
- Mark Fax, composer and musicologist
- Natalie Leota Hinderas, pianist, composer and musicologist; returning fellow 1948
- John Tate Lanning, historian
- Walter McAfee, astronomer
- Willard Motley, writer
- Dave Masato Okada, sociologist
- Marion Palfi, photographer
- Rose Piper, painter and textile designer

=== 1947 ===
- William Artis, sculptor
- Byron Burford, painter
- Edward Burrows, historian and civil rights activist
- Martin Dibner, writer
- Grace Towns Hamilton, politician and social justice advocate
- Robert E. Hayden, writer and U.S. Poet Laureate
- Blyden Jackson, writer and literary critic
- Ulysses Kay, composer; 1947-1948 fellowship
- Thomas Hal Phillips, novelist, actor and screenwriter
- John Rhoden, sculptor
- George C. Stoney, documentary filmmaker
- Alonzo Smythe Yerby, physician and public health official

=== 1948 ===
- Walter Franklin Anderson, musician and composer
- Arthur Chester Banks, Jr. political scientist
- Elizabeth L. Sturz, poet and social worker
- Vivian Jones Beamon, education
- Samuel L. Myers, economist and university president
- Marion Perkins, sculptor
- Liston Pope, pastor, theologian, and university dean
- Pearl Primus, dancer, choreographer, and anthropologist
- Oscar W. Ritchie, sociologist
- Haywood Rivers, artist and gallerist
- Samuel Reid Spencer, Jr., college president

== See also ==
- Rosenwald Schools
- Rosenwald (film)
- Julian Mack
- Henry H. Rogers
- Francis W. Shepardson
- Booker T. Washington
