= Oscar W. Ritchie =

Educator, scholar, author & sociologist (1909–1967)

- Born: February 16, 1909; Hallandale, Florida
- Died: June 16, 1967 (aged 58); Ravenna, Ohio
- Occupations: Professor; Sociologist; Author; Scholar
- Spouse: Edith Ritchie (1929–1979)

Oscar Washington Ritchie (February 16, 1909 – June 16, 1967) was the first African-American professor at a predominantly white university in the state of Ohio.

== Background and education ==
Ritchie's parents moved to Hallandale, Florida, from the Caribbean, where his father had owned a fruit stand. His father died before Ritchie completed high school. At the age of 17, he enrolled in Florida A & M University (FAMU), where he became founder and editor of the school newspaper.

The great depression of 1929 derailed his college career. He dropped out of college and joined a local band that went on the road, with him playing banjo. In Chicago, Illinois, he met his wife Edith and they had their only child, George.

Long after the band stopped, the family remained in Chicago. Ritchie worked odd jobs for a few years and eventually got a job as a porter in Cleveland, Ohio. In 1933, he got a job in Massillon, Ohio, working at Republic Steel.

By 1942 he was back in school, this time at the predominantly White Kent State University in Ohio. He initially studied pre-law but switched to sociology and graduated in 1946, with a B.S. in sociology, while working a full-time job at a steel mill in Massillon.

== Career ==
He immediately enrolled in a graduate program at Kent State University and so impressed the chairman of the Sociology department, James T. Laing, that he was given a teaching position in 1947, taking over from former faculty member Harley Preston. He was working as a full-time faculty member, something that was quite unusual for a graduate student.

During the summer of 1947 he attended the Yale Institute of Alcoholic Studies on a scholarship and earned enough transferable credits to graduate from Kent State that summer. His master's thesis, "A Sociological Analysis of Alcoholics Anonymous," was published in the Yale Quarterly Journal of Alcoholic Studies.

By fall 1947, Ritchie was appointed full-time faculty member in the Sociology Department, then located in Lowry Hall. This appointment made him the first African-American faculty member at a predominantly white university in the state of Ohio.

University president Bowman, liberal as he may have been in making Ritchie's appointment to the faculty, considered the NAACP to be "a radical organization", and refused to allow the students to form a local chapter in 1954. The university had its own discriminatory housing policies, which Ritchie fought and eventually forced the university to change in 1963. The Sociology and English departments led the way by protesting and threatening to walk out, finally prevailing.

Ritchie received a scholarship to the Yale Institute of Alcoholic Studies. He was awarded one of the last Julius Rosenwald Fellowship's in 1948, which is given " for the well-being of mankind." to study the factors that led Negro educators to work at non-segregated educational facilities. He was the first Kent State graduate to win this award. He also received the Guggenheim Award awarded to graduate students for advanced study.

While pursuing his doctorate, he studied at the University of Wisconsin and then at NYU. Ritchie received his PhD in sociology from New York University in 1958. His dissertation was titled "Male Delinquents' Assessments of an Industrial School: A Study of the Relationship between Assessments and Length of Residence."

Shortly before his death, he was elected by his colleagues to the chairmanship of the Sociology Department.

Ritchie worked with a number of the Greek organizations on campus as an adviser, including Kappa Alpha Psi and Alpha Phi Alpha fraternities, which he advised from 1955 to 1956 and 1958–1962, respectively. He also assisted in the establishment of the Alpha Phi Alpha Education Foundation, which offered a scholarship as early as 1965. His work with the Alphas won him the honor of being named Director of Educational Activities for Alpha Phi Alpha's national chapter, an appointment he held from 1966 until his death in 1967.

== Community involvement ==
Ritchie was a lifelong musician. Although he did not play with a band as he had in Florida, he did direct musical groups, outside of the university. From reports in the local papers it appears that he revived the Massillon Community Chorus in 1938, which developed into a full-blown 40-member choir by 1941. During that three-year period they toured more than 50 Ohio cities. The group was "composed of mill workers, garage mechanics, house maids, and WPA laborers." The amateur chorus donated all of their earnings to the Urban League "for the purchase of music, choir robes and a recording machine." With his wife Edith in the choir and him on piano, he managed to keep his musical ambitions alive by presenting Negro spirituals a la Frederick and Harriet Loudin of the neighboring town of Ravenna, Ohio, who led the Fisk Jubilee Singers, for nearly 30 years.

In concert with some of his colleagues at Kent State he also co-founded the Portage County Family Planning, Counseling and Mental Health Center in Ravenna, Ohio, with Dr. Dwight I. Arnold, a KSU Emeritus professor, and Dr. John Guidabaldi (chairman, associate professor, Early Childhood Ed.), in 1962.

He was also an active member of the Massillon Urban League and the Canton NAACP, which recognized his work as the leader of their local recruitment drive in the 1950s, that nearly doubled the size of their local membership. Considering the attitude of KSU President Bowman towards these types of organizations, these were bold moves. He was also involved with protests against housing discrimination on and off Kent's main campus and surrounding communities. Ritchie also spoke out about injustices in the juvenile justice system.

== Recognition and legacy ==
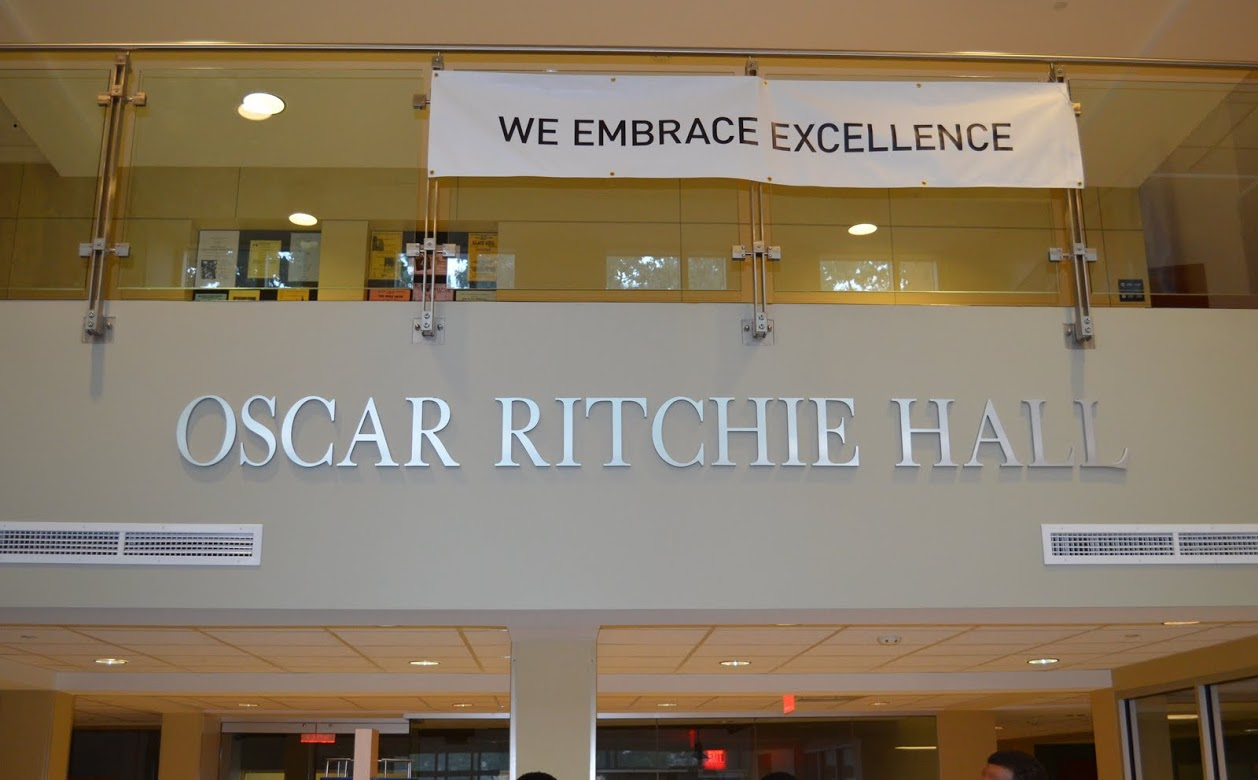
Interior of Oscar Ritchie Hall at Kent State University.

In recognition of his 29 years of service to the university a building on the Kent University campus was renamed Oscar W. Ritchie Hall on November 9, 1977.

The Oscar W. Ritchie Four-Year Scholarship Fund was established in 1977 with an endowment of $450,000. It grants $2,000 to $8,000 per year to qualifying African American students who intend to attend Kent State University. A grant of $250 is made to all applicants.

== Death ==
Ritchie died on June 16, 1967, in Ravenna, Ohio's Robinson Memorial Hospital.

== Published journal articles ==
- Ritchie, O.W. (1999). "Thoughts Upon an Impact Study of an Industrial School for Male Delinquents". Juvenile Criminal Law & Criminology.

== Bibliography ==
- "Toward a Descriptive Analysis of the Structural aspects of Organized Crime" by Oscar W. Ritchie, 1953. Unpublished manuscript.
- Ritchie, O.W. (1947). "A Sociological Analysis of Alcoholics Anonymous" (Master's Thesis, Kent State University.
- Weeks, H. Ashley and Ritchie, Oscar W. (1956). "An evaluation of the services of the State of Ohio to its delinquent children and youth", Columbus, Bureau of Educational Research, Ohio State University.
- Ritchie, O.W. (1958). "Male Delinquents' Assessments of an Industrial School: A Study of the Relationship Between Assessments and Length of Residence" (Doctoral dissertation, New York University.
- Ritchie, O.W. & Koller, Marvin R. (1964). Sociology of Childhood (1st ed.). Appleton-Century-Crofts.
