= Bill Traylor =

African American artist and sharecropper (1854–1949)

William Traylor (April 1, c. 1853 – October 23, 1949) was an African-American self-taught artist from Lowndes County, Alabama. Born into slavery, Traylor spent the majority of his life after emancipation as a sharecropper. It was only after 1939, following his move to Montgomery, Alabama, that Traylor began to draw. At the age of 85, he took up a pencil and a scrap of cardboard to document his recollections and observations. From 1939 to 1942, while working on the sidewalks of Montgomery, he produced nearly 1,500 pieces of art.

While Traylor received his first public exhibition in 1940, it was not until 30 years after his death that his work finally began to receive broader attention, in the late 1970s. Recent acceptance of Traylor as a significant figure of American folk and modern art has been founded on the efforts of Charles Shannon, as well as the evolving tastes of the art world. Shannon, who first encountered Traylor's work in 1940, brought Traylor to the attention of the larger art world. Traylor now holds a central position in the fields of "self-taught" and modern art.

== Life ==
Bill Traylor was born in April 1853, in Benton, Alabama. His parents, Sally (1815–1880) and Bill Calloway (1805–1860+), were slaves on the plantation of George Hartwell Traylor (1801–1881), a white cotton grower. Bill had five siblings: Liza (1837), Henry (1845), Frank (1846), Jim (1847), and Emet (1854).

For young Traylor, the mid-1860s marked a period of radical personal and economic change. In 1865, Traylor witnessed the Confederacy’s loss to the Union. This social and political rupture was compounded by the death of his father sometime between 1860 and 1866. While the end of the war ensured his legal emancipation, Traylor remained entrapped in the economic structures of the South's Jim Crow laws. He continued to work on the plantation, but now as a sharecropper.

While documenting the details of Traylor's early life remains difficult, scholars have noted that he fathered a number of children over his lifetime. In 1884, Traylor started a family with Larisa Dunklin (1872–). By 1887, they had had three children: George, Pauline, and Sally. By 1898, the couple had five more children: Rueben, Easter, Alice, Lillian, and an unnamed "child". In 1887, Traylor fathered Nettie from another relationship. Additionally, in the late 1890s, he took a second wife, Laura Williams (1870-). The couple had five children: Clement, Will, Mack, John Henry, and Walter. In 1902, Traylor had a son named Jimmie with another woman. Later in life, Traylor was quoted as mentioning that "he raised twenty-odd children."

In 1909 Traylor was farming in Montgomery County and in 1928 he left for the capital city of Montgomery. Explaining his moves, Traylor later remarked: "My white folks had died and my children had scattered." For 75-year-old Traylor, it would prove to be a challenging new beginning, but he rented a room and later a small shack, and found work to support himself. Several years after the move, he found himself struggling to make ends meet. After rheumatism prevented him from continuing to work at a shoe factory, Traylor was forced out on to the streets. Receiving a small public assistance stipend, he entered into the ranks of the homeless. At night he slept in the back room of the Ross-Clayton Funeral Home. During the day, he camped out on Monroe Street.

In June 1939, Charles Shannon, a young, white artist, first noticed Traylor and his budding talent. Intrigued, Shannon began to repeatedly stop by Traylor's block to observe him working. Shannon later remarked on the progression of Traylor's craft. "He worked steadily in the days that followed and it rapidly became evident that something remarkable was happening: his subjects became more complex, his shapes stronger, and the inner rhythm of his work began to assert itself."

Soon after this encounter Shannon began to supply Traylor with poster paints, brushes, and drawing paper. A friendship soon transpired. In February 1940, New South, a cultural center that Shannon founded, launched the exhibit Bill Traylor: People’s Artist. It included a hundred of Traylor's drawings. Nevertheless, despite numerous reviews in local newspapers, none of Traylor's works were sold. The exhibit, however, remains notable. It was the only one that Traylor would live to see.

In 1942, Traylor made his New York debut. From January 5 to January 19, the Ethical Culture Fieldston School in Riverdale, New York hosted Bill Traylor: American Primitive (Work of an old Negro). Victor E. D'Amico, The Museum of Modern Art’s then director of education, organized the exhibit. Nevertheless, while the exhibit introduced Traylor’s work to the larger New York art community, it did not result in the purchase of any Traylor pieces by any museum. Notably, Alfred Barr, the director of MoMA, offered to purchase several drawings for the museum’s collection, as well as his own personal one. However, after he only offered one or two dollars for each Traylor’s piece, the deal quickly fell through.

From 1942 to 1945, Traylor lived with his children and other relatives in Detroit, Chicago, New York, Philadelphia, and Washington D.C. After losing his leg to gangrene, Traylor moved back to Montgomery to live with his daughter, Sarah (Sally) Traylor Howard. On October 23, 1949, he died at Oak Street Hospital in Montgomery. He was later buried at Mount Moriah Cemetery.

== Subject matter ==
As a collection, Traylor’s drawings depict his experiences and observations from rural and urban life in pared down repeated symbols, shapes, and figures. His visual lexicon includes images of people, plants, animals, and local landmarks. While some pieces focus on a single animal, like a dog or snake, other paintings offer composed scenes of individuals gathering by a fountain or working on a farm.

His works range from simple single-figured depictions to more compositionally complicated pieces of multiple silhouetted figures. Shannon remarked that the evolution reflected Traylor’s own maturation as an artist. The pieces from Traylor's last year of work "brought together many of the visual themes he had developed by this time: strong abstract forms, combination plant-animal and abstract forms, people in various 'states' ranging from serenity to hysteria, thieves and drinks and devilish kids".

== Exhibition history ==
Traylor's work finally caught the attention of the broader art world in the late 1970s and 1980s. In 1974, Shannon and his wife brought Traylor's entire oeuvre out from storage and began to sort through it. Resistant to titling Traylor's pieces, Shannon originally categorized the collection according to subject matter. In 1975, he further divided the collection into 25 categories of shared imagery and three additional categories: earliest works, extra large works, and special works. As an organized collection, Traylor's works finally began to evoke interest among art enthusiasts.

In 1979 Richard H. Oosterom agreed to hold a solo exhibit featuring Bill Traylor's pieces. From December 13, 1979 to January 12, 1980, R.H. Oosterom, Inc. mounted the show Bill Traylor 1854–1974, Works on Paper. The exhibit also led to the first institutional acquisition of Traylor's drawings. The Schomburg Center for Research in Black Culture purchased Traylor's "Man on Mule".

It wasn’t until Traylor's 1982 debut at the Corcoran Gallery of Art in Washington D.C. that the audiences started to note the significance of his work. Curators Jane Livingstone and John Beardsley included 36 of Traylor's pieces in the landmark exhibition Black Folk Art in America 1930-1980. Soon after, Shannon donated some of Traylor's works to the Montgomery Museum of Fine Arts, one of which the High Museum of Art later purchased.

The year 1982 "inaugurated the larger public exposure, critical analysis, and publication through which Traylor’s work has become widely recognized." In 1995, the Metropolitan Museum of Art displayed Traylor's works. In 1996, six weeks after Shannon's death, MoMA included Traylor's drawings in the exhibition A Century of American Drawing from the Collection.

More recently, Traylor has been accepted into national and international ranks of the most prominent self-taught artists. Scholars and curators have moved away from labeling him as a "primitive" or "outsider" artist, and have instead chose to focus on his prominence and significance within 20th-century American art. In 2005 the Studio Museum in Harlem launched the exhibit Bill Traylor, William Edmondson, and the Modernist Impulse. The traveling exhibit, which was curated by Josef Helfenstein, Director of the Menil Collection, and Russell Bowman, former Director of the Milwaukee Art Museum, featured 50 of Traylor's drawings and paintings. Looking past Traylor's position as a "folk" or "outsider" artist, the exhibit examined his work in relation to "the modernist works of the established or 'official' avant-garde of the period."

The American Folk Art Museum continued this effort in 2013 with two exhibitions. From June 11 to September 22, the Museum hosted both Bill Traylor: Drawings From the Collections of the High Museum of Art and the Montgomery Museum of Fine Arts, a traveling exhibition, and Traylor in Motion: Wonders from New York Collections, an in-house exhibit. Stacy C. Hollander, the American Folk Art Museum's chief curator, and Valérie Rousseau, its curator of art of the self-taught art and art brut, organized Traylor in Motion. Together, the exhibits featured 104 of Traylor's drawings and paintings. Roberta Smith, from The New York Times, described the coupled exhibits as "offer(ing) total immersion in his late-life burst of genius."

The largest exhibition of Traylor's work to date, Between Worlds: The Art of Bill Traylor, was on display at the Smithsonian Museum of American Art from September 28, 2018 to April 7, 2019. It was the first retrospective ever presented for an artist born into slavery. The exhibition was organized by Leslie Umberger, curator of folk and self-taught art, who also wrote the exhibition catalog. The museum has expanded its holdings of the artist through important acquisitions and donations, notably, the acquisition of seminal works from the Judy Saslow Collection.

== Popular and scholarly perception ==
In 1942, when detailing Traylor's exhibitional debut, local journalists heralded the "primitive" and "African" quality of his artwork. Subsequent reviews followed in line. The Montgomery Advertiser published an article entitled "The Enigma of Uncle Bill Traylor: Born A Slave, Untutored in Art, His Paintings Are Reminiscent of Cave Pictures – And Picasso." This racialized framing of Traylor's work endured throughout most of the 20th century.

In 2013 the American Folk Art Museum hosted a full-day symposium, Bill Traylor: Beyond the Figure, to discuss his complicated legacy.

Looking towards Traylor's personal history, Alana Shilling from The Brooklyn Rail warned against viewing Traylor's pieces exclusively in terms of their aesthetic value. "To discount" his personal struggles "is to ignore what makes Traylor not only a noteworthy artist, but also an eloquent annalist of a nation’s history: its brutality."

Traylor's life and art were the subject of a 2012 children's book, It Jes’ Happened: When Bill Traylor Started to Draw, written by Don Tate and illustrated by R. Gregory Christie.

The Smithsonian Museum of American Art's retrospective, Between Worlds: The Art of Bill Traylor, September 2018 - April 2019, received considerable popular attention, including articles in The New Yorker, The Washington Post, and The New York Times. It was also featured on CBS News Sunday Morning.

The symposium held in 2019, in conjunction with the Traylor retrospective at Smithsonian Museum of American Art, discussed how new information about his visual record of African-American life could provide insight into the story of the US.

In 2021, a documentary by film-maker Jeffrey Wolf on Bill Traylor's life, entitled Bill Traylor: Chasing Ghosts, was released.

== Controversies ==
In November 1992, Traylor's heirs filed suit against Shannon for possession of Traylor's drawings. The suit was settled in 1993, with Shannon agreeing to transfer a dozen of Traylor's works, then valued at $10,000 to $25,000 US dollars each, to Traylor's heirs. Both parties released a joint statement that recognized Shannon's contribution to Traylor's fame.

The 2009 publication of Mechal Sobel's book Painting a Hidden Life: The Art of Bill Traylor sparked considerable controversy. Within it, Sobel explored a number of claims: Traylor's supposed murdering of his wife's lover, the Birmingham police's lynching of Traylor's son in 1929, and Traylor's wide use of symbols to hide his call for Black opposition to the Jim Crow and Lynch Law.

== Bibliography ==
- Crawley, Susan Mitchell and Margaret Lynne Ausfeld (eds), Bill Traylor: Drawings from the Collections of the High Museum of Art and the Montgomery Museum of Fine Arts. New York: Delmonico Books/Prestel Publishing, 2012.
- Denson, G. Roger. "Resisting the Whitening of Bill Traylor: Why We Should Remember the Slave and Sharecropper As Much As The Artist," Huffington Post, August 23, 2013.
- F.F.Economist, The. "Bill Traylor at the High Museum of Art| He drew what he saw", The Economist, February 10, 2012.
- Finore, Diane. "Art by Bill Traylor", The Clarion, Spring/Summer 1983, 42–48.
- Helfenstein, Josef and Roman Kurzmeyer, Bill Traylor: 1854–1949: Deep Blues. New Haven: Yale University Press, 1999.
- Hirschl & Adler Modern. Bill Traylor: 1854–1947. New York: Eastern Press, Inc., 1995.
- Marcesa, Frank and Roger Ricco. Bill Traylor: His Art - His Life. New York: Alfred A. Knopf, 1991.
- Montgomery Museum of Fine Arts. Lively Times and Exciting Events: The Drawings of Bill Traylor. Montgomery, Alabama: Montgomery Museum of Fine Arts, 1993.
- Shilling, Alana. "Traylor in Motion: Wonders from New York Collections and Bill Traylor: Drawings from the Collections of the High Museum of Art and the Montgomery Museum of Fine Arts," Brooklyn Rail, July 15, 2013.
- Sobel, Mechal. Painting a Hidden Life: The Art of Bill Traylor. Baton Rouge: Louisiana State University Press, 2009. ISBN 978-0-8071-3401-6
- Tate, Don, author / R. Gregory Christie, illustrator. It Jes' Happened: When Bill Traylor Started to Draw. Lee & Low Books, New York, New York, 2012. ISBN 978-1-60060-260-3.
- Umberger, Leslie. Between Worlds: The Art of Bill Traylor. Washington D.C.: Smithsonian American Art Museum in association with Princeton University Press, 2018. ISBN 978-0-69118-267-4.
