= Ross-Clayton Funeral Home =

Oldest African American funeral home

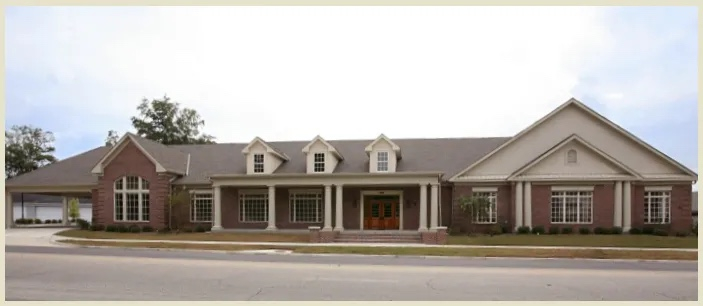

- Map showing the present location of Ross-Clayton Funeral Home in Montgomery, Alabama.
- 32°22′17″N 86°17′13″W
- Location: 1412 Adams Ave, Montgomery Alabama 36104, United States of America

History
- Founded: by Robert Ambers Ross
- Built: in 1918

Ross-Clayton Funeral Home is the oldest African American funeral home in Montgomery, Alabama. Founded in 1918 by Robert Ambers Ross and William Clayton.

== History ==
When initially established in 1918, Ross-Clayton was located on 111 Monroe Street, which at the time was the hub for Montgomery's black-owned businesses, Robert Ross, a prominent undertaker, partnered with William Clayton. William Clayton served as the funeral home's embalmer.

The funeral home moved to 524 South Union Street in 1939 then to 1412 Adams Avenue in 1958, where it has remained since.

The funeral home initially offered traditional funeral services, but soon expanded to include ambulance services with the latest equipment, a rarity at the time.

== Community service ==
Ross-Clayton Funeral Home was the largest Black funeral chapel in the city and has a long history of community service, particularly during the civil rights movement. The funeral home supported the movement by providing transportation for black voters and participating in the Montgomery bus boycott, conduct class for colored wardens, with E. P. Wallace, serving as the instructor, at Ross-Clayton's South Union Street location. The funeral home also offered its facilities for meetings and events, including hosting renowned artist Bill Traylor. Ross-Clayton's history of involvement in the community earned it recognition as a "jewel in the black community" by state historian Richard Bailey.

== Legacy ==
Ross-Clayton Funeral Home has been recognized and awarded for its contributions to Montgomery. In 2011, the state of Alabama erected a historic marker in front of the funeral home, acknowledging its significance. The funeral home has also received resolutions and certificates of respect from various organizations, including the city of Montgomery, Alabama State University, and the National Funeral Directors and Morticians Association.

Robert Ambers Ross
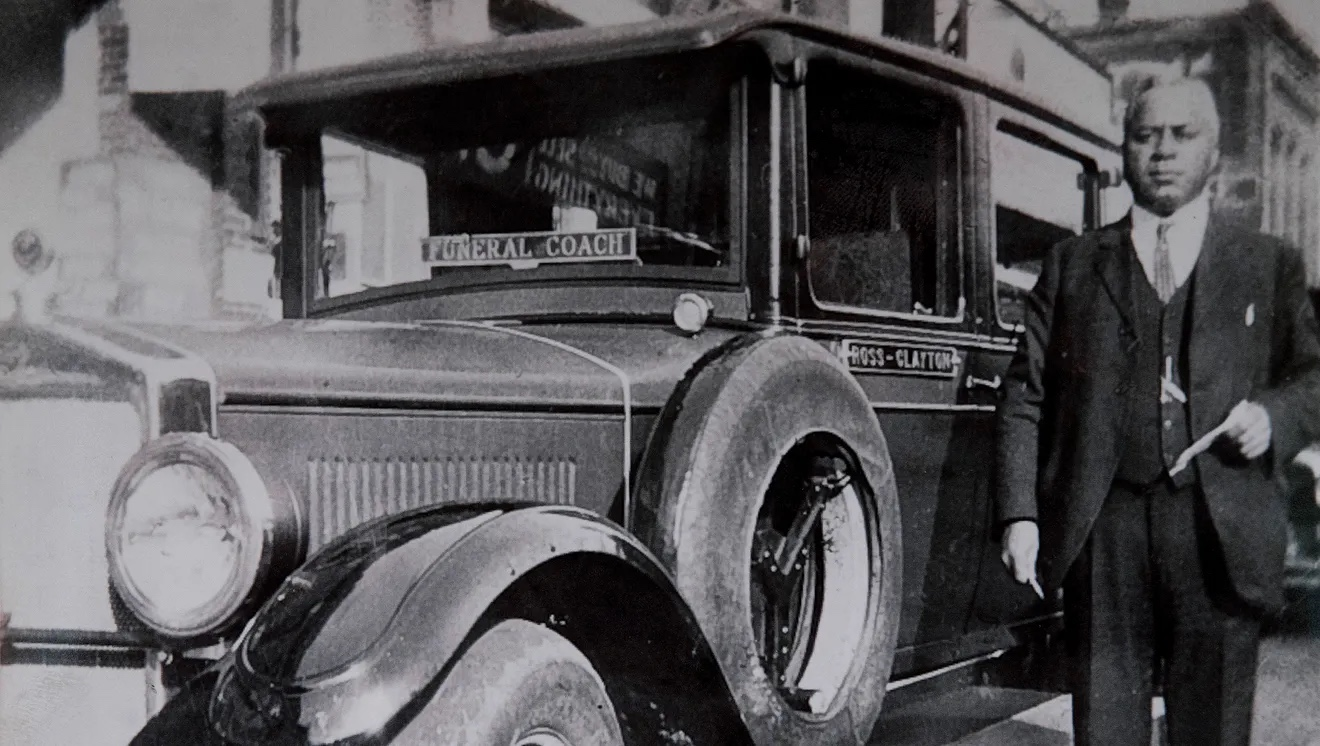
- Founding President of the Ross-Clayton Funeral Home, 1918.
- Died: 1945
- Known for: Founding President of the Ross-Clayton Funeral Home and Founding member and Inaugural President of Alabama Colored Funeral Directors and Embalmers, presently operating as Funeral Directors & Morticians Association, Inc.

== Former presidents ==
Robert Ross, was the founding president. His son David Calloway Ross Sr. succeeded him in this office in 1936. David's son, David Calloway Ross Jr. then became president in 1978. David Ross Jr. died on October 14, 2020.

William Clayton, who was originally an embalmer but became funeral director, died in 1943. His wife Frazzie Clayton, also a funeral director, died in 1947. Their daughter, Jule Clayton Lewis, started out as a funeral director. She began serving as secretary-treasurer in 1947. Her husband, Rufus A. Lewis, servedin that capacity when she died in 1958.

== Current president ==
In December 2021, the Ross-Clayton Funeral Home board of directors named David Calloway Ross Jr.'s daughter, Dr. Sharon A. Ross as president.

== Image gallery ==
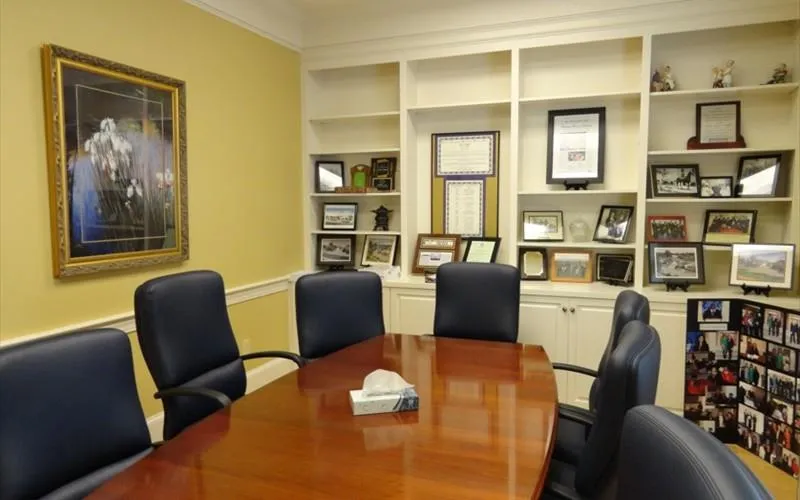
Ross-Clayton Funeral Director's office

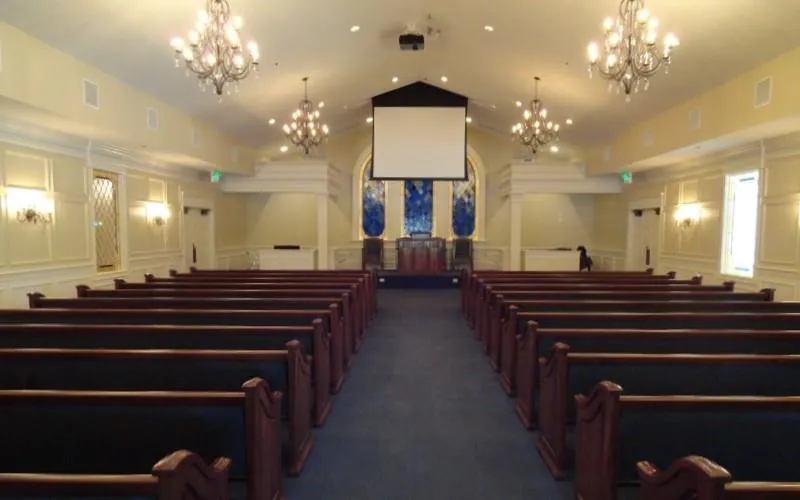
Ross-Clayton's chapel or service room

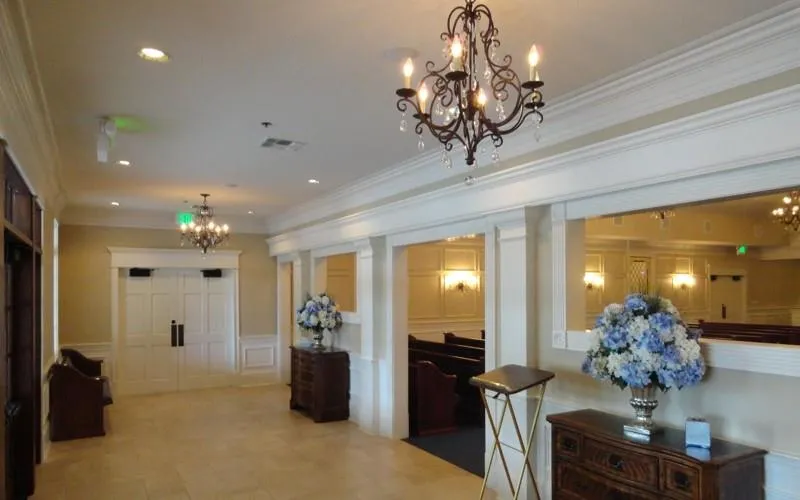
Ross-Clayton's viewing rooms or visitation rooms

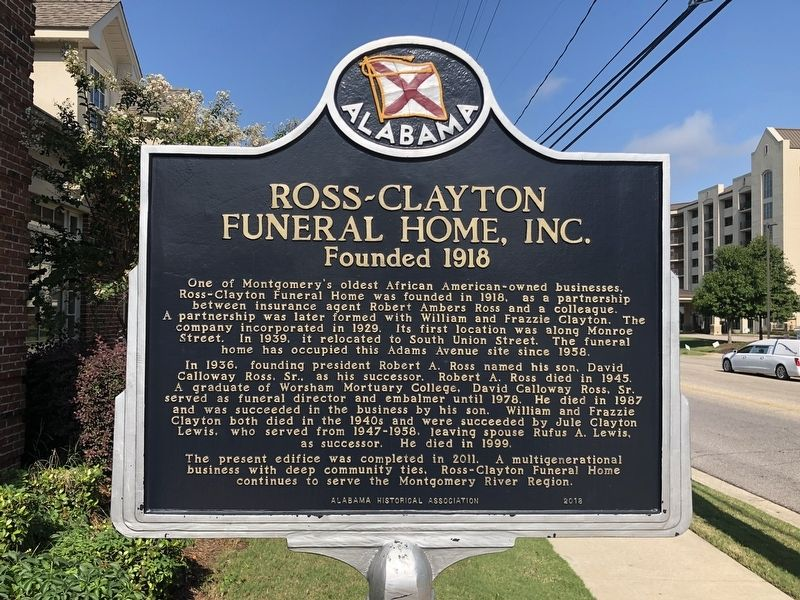
Declaration of Historical Marker by the Alabama Historical Association

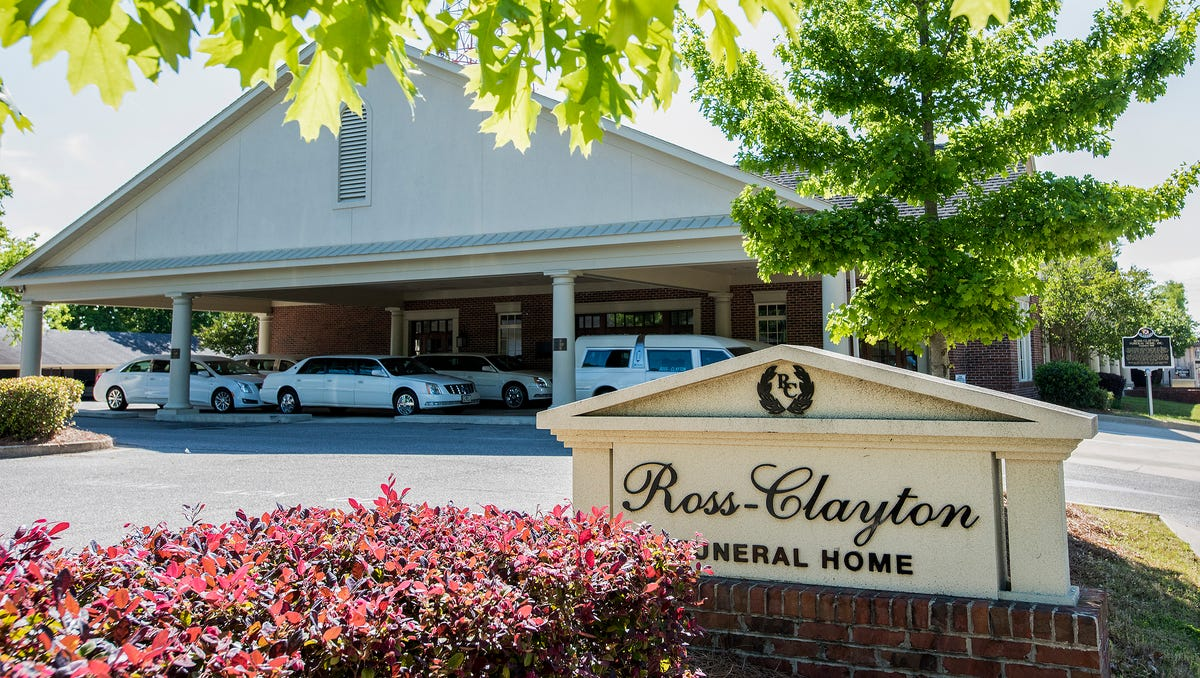
Parking for hearses and limousines

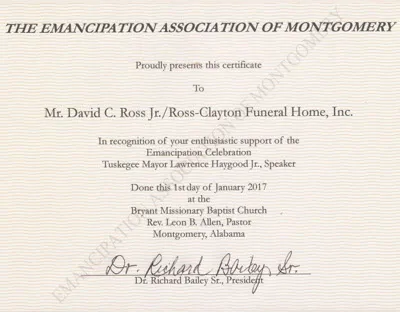
Certificate for recognition of enthusiastic support of the Emancipation Association of Montgomery.
