= Mollie E. Dunlap =

American librarian, bibliographer and educator

Mollie Ernestine Dunlap
- Born: September 2, 1898; Paducah, Kentucky, US
- Died: July 7, 1977 (aged 78); Ann Arbor, Michigan, US
- Education: Ohio State University; University of Michigan
- Occupations: Librarian, bibliographer

Mollie Ernestine Dunlap (September 2, 1898 – July 7, 1977) was a librarian, bibliographer, and educator. Her research illuminated the scholarship of African Americans and the experience of African Americans in higher education, especially the groundbreaking publication of the Index to Selected Negro Publications Received in the Hallie Q. Brown Library. Her work as a founding member of the first African American library association, as well as within the American Library Association, championed the civil rights of black librarians in the United States.

== Early life and education ==
Mollie Ernestine Dunlap was born September 2, 1898, in Paducah, Kentucky, where she grew up. Dunlap studied English and elementary education at Wilberforce University, and received a bachelor's degree from Ohio State University in 1928. After receiving a Rosenwald Fund scholarship, she went on to study librarianship at the University of Michigan, earning a second bachelor's degree in 1931 and a Master of Library Science degree in 1932.

From 1918 to 1923, Dunlap was an instructor at Wilberforce University.

== Work in libraries ==
Dunlap received an offer to become a librarian at the Winston-Salem Teachers College in 1925 and worked there until 1934. In 1934, she returned to Wilberforce as university librarian.

At the 1947 founding of Central State College, Dunlap became the library director and guided the construction of the Hallie Q. Brown Memorial Library. She created and organized the African American collection there, becoming the university archivist in 1968.

== Service to the library community ==
Dunlap was a founding member and the first vice president of the North Carolina Negro Library Association, founded at Shaw University in April 1934; the organization was the first African American library association.

The 1936 annual conference of the American Library Association was held in Richmond, Virginia, and caused an uproar among African American attendees when they were not permitted to reserve rooms at the conference hotel or attend meetings where meals were served. When ALA's response was merely to defend the organization against claims of wrongdoing, Dunlap was one of the voices calling for ALA to strive for "true principles of democracy". She served as a member of the Special Committee on Racial Discrimination, and helped draft the 1936 "resolution that led the ALA to take a radical stance on the equal treatment of black librarians."

== Scholarship ==
Dunlap's research included the first study focused on the reading habits of black college students. She encouraged librarians to dedicate themselves "to providing libraries which are an unfailing source of pleasure and inspiration, as well as information." In 1935, she published a study of "Special Collections of Negro Literature in the United States". Dunlap was assistant editor of the Negro College Quarterly from 1944 to 1947, where she published several bibliographical studies. Coauthored with Anne O'H. Williamson, her study "Institutions of Higher Learning among Negroes in the United States of America: a Compendium" was published in 1947, providing data that allowed for comparative analysis of those institutions.

Dunlap continued her scholarship while working at Central State University, becoming one of the founding members of the Journal of Human Relations. As her role as a founding member of the Wilberforce, Ohio, branch of the American Association of University Women, Dunlap wrote Despite Discrimination: Some Aspects of Negro Life in the United States in 1949. Her most significant work, the Index to Selected Negro Publications Received in the Hallie Q. Brown Library is an "indispensable reference tool" for those studying the African American experience.

== Legacy ==
Dunlap received the Distinguished Alumnus Award from the University of Michigan in 1976. Her official papers are held in the Hallie Q. Brown Library at Central State University.
