= Willis J. King =

American bishop (1886–1976)

Willis Jefferson King (October 1, 1886 – 1976) was an African-American Methodist bishop, college professor and author. He was a professor at Gammon Theological Seminary.

== Education and career ==
King attended Wiley College, Boston University School of Theology, and Harvard University, and received his Ph.D. in sociology from Boston University in 1921. He was selected as the black students' representative at the World's Student and Christian Federation in Peking, China, and as a Fellow of the Julius Rosenwald Fund for Research at Oxford University. He served as Professor of Old Testament Literature at Gammon Theological Seminary (1918–1930), president of Samuel Huston College (1930–1932), and president of Gammon Theological Seminary (1932–1944).

King served as a deacon in the Texas Conference of the Methodist Episcopal Church in 1908. He became an elder in 1913 and held pastorates in Texas (Greenville, St. Paul, Galveston, and Houston) and in Boston, Massachusetts. The Central Jurisdiction of the Methodist Church elected him bishop in 1944. Bishop King presided over the Liberia Conference (1944–1956) and the New Orleans Area (1956–1960), including two conferences in Texas, two in Mississippi, and one in Louisiana.

King retired in 1960 to New Orleans, where he spent his time in writing and speaking. He died in 1976.

== Honors and awards ==
King received honorary degrees from Boston University and the University of Liberia. The administration building at Wiley College is named after him. Other awards and recognitions include the Order Star of African Redemption and the Knight Commander Order of Pioneers (Liberia). In 1975 he was honored as the oldest living United Methodist bishop.

== Partial bibliography ==
=== Author ===
- The Negro in American Life (1926)
- Christian Bases of World Order (1943)
- History of the Methodist Church Mission in Liberia (1951)

=== Contributor ===
- Personalism in Theology (1943)
- History of American Methodism (1964)

== Sources ==
- "King, Willis Jefferson", in the Handbook of Texas Online
- Nail, Olin W. (ed.), History of Texas Methodism, 1900–1960 (Austin, 1961)
- Willis J. King Papers Syracuse University
- Willis J. King papers Atlanta University Center Robert W. Woodruff Library
