= Frances Davis =

Nurse and activist

- Born: 28 April 1882; Shelby, North Carolina?
- Died: 11 May 1965 (aged 83); Detroit, Michigan
- Education: Knoxville College; Freedmen's Hospital Training School for Nurses; Columbia University
- Spouse: William Davis
- Scientific career
- Fields: Nursing
- Workplaces: Dunbar Hospital; Detroit Health Department

Frances Reed Elliott Davis (28 April c. 1882 – 11 May 1965), was an American nurse and community activist.

== Life ==
Frances Davis was born on 28 April, about 1882, probably in Shelby, North Carolina to a mixed-race family. Her mother died when she was five years old and her father abandoned her, so she was raised by a guardian. One of the families for whom she worked as a teenager paid for her to attend a teacher training program at Knoxville College. Davis graduated, but she had always wanted to be a nurse, so she enrolled in the nursing program there. She was forced to leave by illness, but she enrolled at the Freedmen’s Hospital Training School for Nurses in Washington, D.C. in early 1910. After graduation, she worked as a private nurse and then enrolled in the Town and Country Nursing Service Course sponsored by the American Red Cross, the first black nurse to take the course. Other graduates of the course were automatically enrolled in the Army Nurse Corps Reserve, but Davis was not because of her race. However, she was enrolled on 2 July 1918, the first black nurse to be allowed to do so. She cared for soldiers in training and victims of the 1918 flu pandemic, but succumbed herself, permanently damaging her heart. After the war she married William Davis; their only child was stillborn.

In 1929 she received a Rosenwald fellowship from the Rosenwald Fund, established by Julian Rosenwald.

She died from a heart attack in Detroit, Michigan, on 11 May 1965.
