= Wolf Kahn =

German-born American painter (1927–2020)

- Born: Hans Wolfgang Kahn; October 4, 1927; Stuttgart, Germany
- Died: March 15, 2020 (aged 92)
- Education: Hans Hofmann; University of Chicago (AB)
- Known for: Painting, Pastels, Printmaking
- Spouse: Emily Mason
- Website: wolfkahn.com

Wolf Kahn (October 4, 1927 – March 15, 2020) was a German-born American painter.

Kahn, known for his combination of Realism and Color Field, worked in pastel, oil paint, and printmaking. He studied under Hans Hofmann, and also graduated from the University of Chicago. Kahn was a resident of both New York City and, during the summer and autumn, West Brattleboro, Vermont.

== Life and career ==
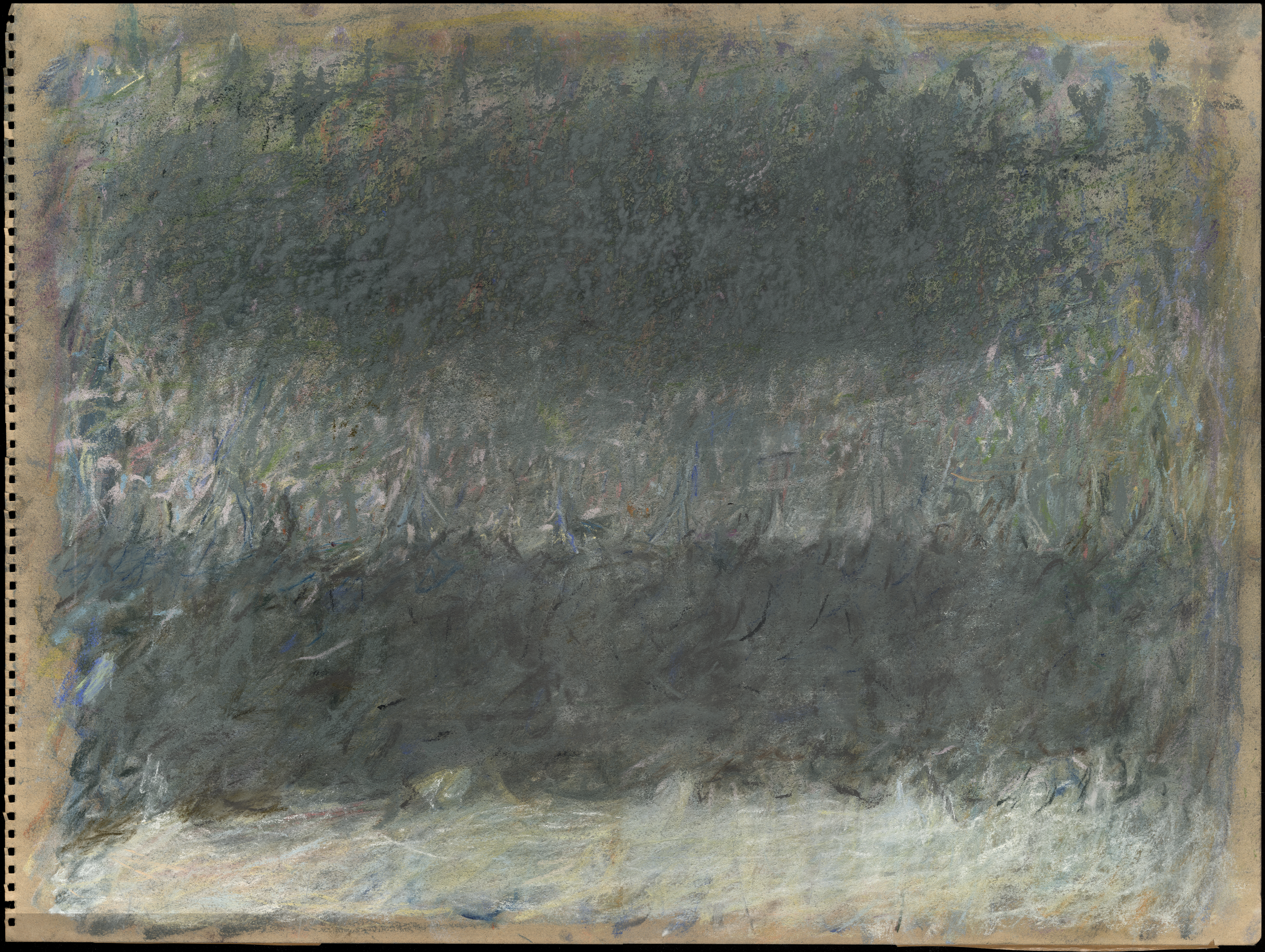
Light Grove, pastel on paper, 1960

Wolf Kahn was born in 1927 in Stuttgart, Germany, the fourth child of Emil and Nellie Budge Kahn. Kahn's father was a notable figure in the music world. He was a musician, composer, conductor, and teacher. Kahn's family was Jewish. In 1933, Kahn's father lost his appointment with the Stuttgart Philharmonic Orchestra when Adolf Hitler came into power and, with increasing antisemitism sweeping Germany, he and his second wife left with Kahn's three siblings for the United States. Wolf was sent to live with his grandmother, Anna Kahn, in Frankfurt, at the age of three. He stated that he began drawing at the age of four.

In 1937, the summer of his 11th birthday, his grandmother signed him up for private art lessons with Miss von Joeden. He drew every day and was inspired by military pageantry, Napoleonic Wars and prominent historical figures including Adolph Menzel and Frederick the Great. In 1939, when Kahn was 12 years old, his grandmother arranged for him to leave Germany for England to live with a host family, first with the John Wade family and then with the Purvis Family. As quotas for immigrant applications in the United States changed, Kahn was able to reunite with his family in New York City in 1940 at the age of 13.

In 1942, Kahn was accepted for his sophomore year at the High School of Music and Art in New York City. His drawings morphed into caricatures. Kahn cited David Low and Thomas Nast as his favorite cartoonists. His first job was graphics editor of the school newspaper, The Overtone. He graduated in 1945. After a year in the U.S. Navy after high school, Kahn first attended the New School to study painting under Stuart Davis. With the aid of the GI Bill, he was able to continue his studies with Abstract Expressionist Hans Hofmann at the Hans Hofmann School. He became Hofmann’s studio assistant by the summer of 1947 at Hofmann's Provincetown, Massachusetts, studio. In 1949, Kahn was accepted into the University of Chicago's Hutchins Program, where he completed a bachelor's degree in eight months.

In the early 1950s he had a brief romantic relationship with designer and curator Sara Penn.

In 1956, he met fellow painter Emily Mason, whom he later joined in Venice, Italy. They married there in March 1957 at the municipal building near the Rialto Bridge, witnessed by strangers and friends including filmmaker Tinto Brass. In 1958 the couple returned to New York City where Mason gave birth to their first daughter Cecily in 1959. In 1963 the family returned to Italy. Their daughter Melany was born in Rome in 1964. In 1968 the couple bought a farm in West Brattleboro, Vermont, where they continued to summer. Kahn died on March 15, 2020, at the age of 92.

== Work ==
Kahn worked in oil and pastel. His works usually cover the subject of landscapes and his own personal vision of nature. His convergence of light and color has been described as combining "pictorial landscapes and painterly abstraction".

=== Influences ===
Surrounded from birth by the work of such artists as Hans Thoma, Carl Spitzweg, Wilhelm Trübner, Franz Winterhalter, by Edwardian furniture, books and bronzes of Schiller and Goethe, it is no wonder that Kahn started drawing at a very young age. While at the University of Chicago, he became interested in philosophy, particularly the writings of Immanuel Kant while making sketches of sailboats riding anchor on Lake Michigan.

Kahn loved the visual effects of Maine's coastline. In the late 1960s after a number of vacations on Deer Isle, Maine, the foggy conditions ultimately led to a significant shift in Kahn's painting. Years of monochromatic work concentrated on varying tonalities finally gave way to intense color. Kahn recalled later, "I began to let the color come through on my canvases...my pastels were always intense, and finally my painting caught up with them."

=== Exhibitions ===
Kahn's very first exhibition was a group show titled, New Provincetown '47, curated by Clement Greenberg at the Seligmann Gallery on 57th Street in New York. The next exhibition would be self-organized by Kahn titled 813 Broadway in 1951. This was followed by a group exhibition in the fall of 1952 at the Hansa Gallery Cooperative, one of a few Hofmann student spinoffs. His first one-man solo exhibition would follow in 1953, also at Hansa Gallery, after a summer trip to Louisiana where he visited his art professor brother, Peter. A real break came after living and painting in Tepoztlan, Mexico, in a studio space afforded by Mrs. Norman. Kahn returned to New York City with an offer to join Grace Borgenicht Gallery in 1955. Her gallery had been in existence on 57th Street since May 1951. In 1960, Kahn accepted a position as a visiting professor at the University of California, Berkeley. Around this same time, his work was included in a major exhibition at the Whitney Museum of American Art titled Young America 1960: 30 Painters under 36. Until his death, Kahn remained very active, still creating new work and exhibiting multiple times per year. In Winter of 2017, Kahn celebrated his 90th birthday with an exhibition of over fifty recent paintings at Miles McEnery Gallery (formerly Ameringer | McEnery | Yohe).

=== Awards and memberships ===
Kahn received a number of awards including a Fulbright Scholarship in 1962, a John Simon Guggenheim Fellowship in 1966, and an Award in Art from the American Academy of Arts and Letters in 1979. Kahn received Lifetime Achievement Awards from the Vermont Council on the Arts 1998 and the National Academy in 2006. He received the University of Chicago Outstanding Alumni Professional Achievement Award in 2012 and the U.S. State Department awarded him the International Medal of Art in 2017. He has honorary doctorates from Wheaton College, 2000 and Union College.

Kahn became a member of the National Academy of Design in 1980 and the American Academy of Arts and Letters in 1984. He was on the Board of Trustees for Marlboro College, in Marlboro, Vermont, and was an honorary trustee at the Brattleboro Museum in Brattleboro, Vermont.

In 2005 the Smithsonian Art Collectors Program commissioned Kahn to produce a print to benefit the cultural and educational programs of the Smithsonian Associates. The screenprint, entitled Aura, hangs in the Graphic Eloquence exhibit in the S. Dillon Ripley Center on the National Mall.

=== Museum collections ===
Kahn's work can be found in numerous museum collections including:

- Art Institute of Chicago, Chicago, IL
- Boca Raton Museum of Art, Boca Raton, FL
- Brooklyn Museum, Brooklyn, NY
- Hirshhorn Museum and Sculpture Garden
- Colby College Museum of Art
- Los Angeles County Museum of Art, Los Angeles, CA
- Memorial Art Gallery, University of Rochester, Rochester, NY
- Metropolitan Museum of Art, New York, NY
- Museum of Fine Arts, Boston, Boston, MA
- Muscarelle Museum of Art at William & Mary, Williamsburg, VA
- National Academy Museum, New York, NY
- Smithsonian American Art Museum, Washington, D.C.
- National Gallery of Art, Washington, DC
- Whitney Museum of American Art, New York, NY
- Yale University Art Gallery, New Haven, CT
- Ackland Art Museum, University of North Carolina, Chapel Hill, NC

== Sources ==
=== References ===
- Marika Herskovic, New York School Abstract Expressionists Artists Choice by Artists (New York School Press, 2000). ISBN 0-9677994-0-6, pp. 32; 37; 194–197
