= Melanie Schiff =

American artist

Melanie Schiff (born 1977) is an American photographer. Schiff was included in the 2008 Whitney Biennial. Her work is included in the collections of the Whitney Museum of American Art and the Museum of Contemporary Art, Chicago. She was an Artadia Awardee in 2006.
