= Charles Shannon (artist) =

American artist and professor

Charles Eugene Shannon (June 22, 1914 – April 5, 1996) was an American artist and professor. Shannon is recognized for his discovery, promotion and conservation of the works of the artist Bill Traylor, whom he met in 1939 in Montgomery, Alabama.

== Early life and education ==
Shannon was born in Montgomery, Alabama in 1914. He studied at Emory University for two years, and then at the Cleveland School of Art from 1932 to 1936.

== Art career ==
In 1939 he received a fellowship from the Julius Rosenwald Foundation to paint subjects in the American South.

Shannon was an originator of the Socialist Realist New South School and Gallery, which was founded in 1939 in his log cabin studio in Butler County, Alabama. The mission of the school was to "broaden cultural life of Southerners of all classes and develop a wider market in the South for arts and crafts". Shannon taught painting and drawing at the school.

In 1940, he was an artist in residence at the West Georgia College, now known as the University of West Georgia. He later worked in the South Pacific as a US Army artist correspondent during the second world war.

Shannon is credited with discovering the artist Bill Traylor, who he met in 1939 while Traylor was selling drawings on the street in Montgomery, Alabama. Shannon bought art supplies for Traylor, who was at the time homeless, and gave him his first show, titled Bill Traylor: People’s Artist, at the New South Gallery. Shannon bought much of Traylor's work for as little as five cents per drawing. In 1982 he sold about 30 of Traylor's drawings to the High Museum of Art for $10,000 US dollars. Shannon was sued in 1992 by Traylor's heirs, who claimed Shannon had improperly obtained Traylor's work. The suit was settled in 1993, with Shannon agreeing to transfer a dozen of Traylor's works, then valued at $10,000 to $25,000 US dollars each, to Traylor's heirs. Both parties released a joint statement that recognized Shannon's contribution to Traylor's fame. A curator at the Montgomery Museum of Fine Arts, Margaret Lynne Ausfeld, has said of Shannon's efforts that “Without Charles Shannon, there would have been little or nothing to interpret—most or all of the work certainly would have been lost”.

Shannon founded the art department at Auburn University Montgomery, where he taught from 1969 until his retirement in 1979.

His work is included in the collections of the Smithsonian American Art Museum, the Morris Museum of Art and the Montgomery Museum of Fine Arts.
