= Ruby Stutts Lyells =

American librarian

- Born: 1908; Anding, Mississippi, US
- Died: December 22, 1994 (aged 85–86); Jackson, Mississippi, US
- Education: Alcorn Agricultural and Mechanical College; Hampton Institute; University of Chicago
- Occupation: Librarian

Ruby Stutts Lyells (1908 – December 22, 1994) was an American librarian and a leader of women's organizations who championed civil rights for decades. She was the first African-American professional librarian in Mississippi.

== Early life and education ==
Ruby Elizabeth Stutts was born in 1908 in Anding, Mississippi; her parents were Tom and Rossie A. Cowan Stutts.

She was valedictorian of the Alcorn Agricultural and Mechanical College class of 1929. She went on to attend the Hampton Institute Library School, receiving a Julius Rosenwald Fellowship and graduating in 1930 with a bachelor's degree in library science. Completing her master's degree at the University of Chicago in 1942, Lyells became the first black person from Mississippi to earn a degree in library science.

A Doctor of Humanities degree was conferred on Lyells by Prentiss Institute.

== Library career ==
After receiving her library degree from Hampton Institute, Lyells returned to her alma mater Alcorn A&M College to work as the head librarian; her work in collection development served as a model for other black land grant colleges. While there she also worked as a student counselor and helped found the Library Division of the Mississippi Teachers Association.

She moved to Chicago for a short time to attend the University of Chicago. After graduating with distinction in 1942, Lyells returned to Mississippi, becoming Mississippi's first professional black librarian.

In 1945 Lyells became the head librarian at Jackson State University, working to modernize the school's library. Two years later, she became head of the Jackson Public Library's College Park and Carver branches; Lyells was the first African American to manage libraries within the segregated system.

Lyells also worked as a librarian at the Atlanta Public Library System and at Iowa State University.

== Activism and community service ==
Historian John Dittmer described Lyells as "a forceful orator" and "an independent force for social change for more than four decades."

Lyells served a number of leadership roles in the state, including serving as president of the Mississippi State Federation of Colored Women's Clubs and as the first African-American executive director of the Mississippi State Council of Human Rights. Lyells was an active proponent of strong school education, and in addition to writing on that subject in the 1940s and the 1950s in the Journal of Negro Education, her work in education included chairing the Biracial Committee for the Jackson Municipal Separate School District and being appointed by the federal courts in 1970 to help implement desegregation. She was a trustee of the Prentiss Institute in Prentiss, Mississippi and the Ruby E. Stutts Lyells Library was dedicated in her name in May 1968.

She was a long-time supporter of the state and national Republican Party and she served on the Advisory Committee of the co-chairman of the Republican National Convention in 1970.

Lyells died in Jackson on December 22, 1994. After her death, Mississippi Senator Thad Cochran commended her on the Senate floor:

[O]ne mark of the courage and interest in the political development of our State was illustrated by Mrs. Lyells' active and conspicuous participation in the development of the modern Republican Party in Mississippi. As an African-American, she took a stand and defended it with grace and with dignity and with intelligence, in a way that reflected credit on many of us who were actively involved in trying to build a new political party as a vehicle for political expression for our State and the citizens of our State at the national level.
