= Luvenia C. Miller =

American biological photographer

- Education: Hampton Institute (BS)
- Scientific career
- Fields: Biological photography

Luvenia C. Miller (September 14, 1909 – September 6, 1997) was an American biological photographer. She was the first African-American woman to serve as the director of the Biological Photographers Association.

== Education and career ==
Miller earned a Bachelor of Science degree in Home Economics from Hampton Institute in 1934, after which she taught for eight years in the North Carolina public school systems. In 1943, she enlisted in the Women's Army Corps (WAC). Miller was an experienced photographer, and she became the first African-American woman to pass the State Board of Photographers examination, as well as the first African-American woman to serve in the photography department of the WAC. Miller exited the military as a sergeant. Following her death, she was buried in Arlington National Cemetery.
