= African Americans in New York City =

Ethnic group and minority in New York City

Black New Yorkers

Total population
- 1.996 million (2020)

Regions with significant populations
- Central Harlem, the North Bronx, Central Brooklyn, and southeast Queens

Languages
- African American Vernacular English, New York City English, American English, Caribbean English, Jamaican Patois, New York Latino English, Spanish, Dominican Spanish, Cuban Spanish, Puerto Rican Spanish, African languages

Religion
- Christianity (Mainly Historically Black Protestant and Catholicism), Judaism, Islam, irreligious, Rastafari

Related ethnic groups
- Caribbean people in New York City especially Jamaican Americans in the city, Black Jews in New York City, Puerto Ricans in New York City, Dominicans in New York City, African immigration to the United States

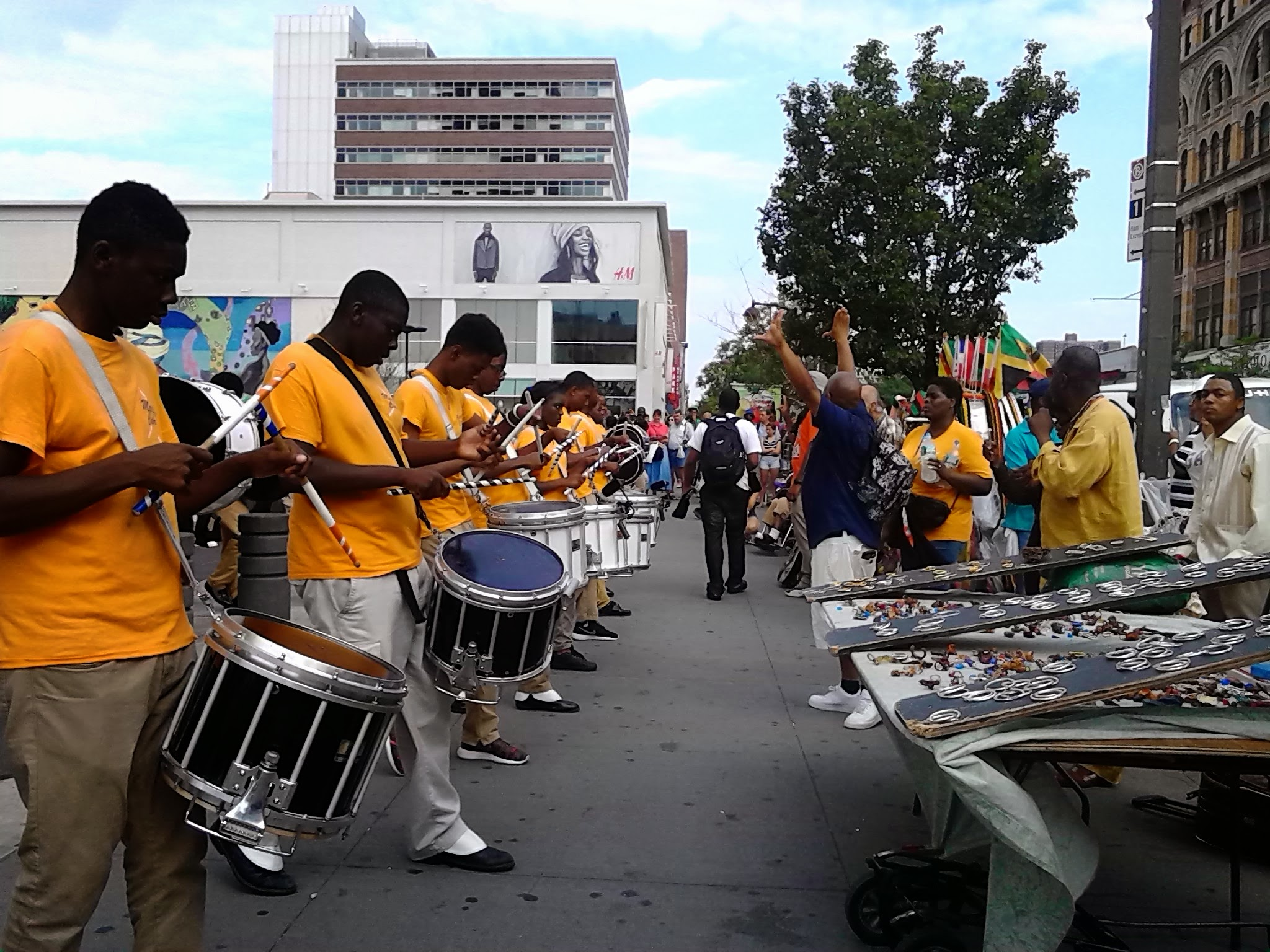
Band rehearsal on 125th Street in Harlem, the historical epicenter of African American culture. New York City is home by a significant margin to the world's largest Black population of any city outside Africa, at over 2.2 million. African immigration is now driving the growth of the Black population in New York City.

New York City has long been home to the largest African American population of any city in the United States, and the world's largest Black population of any city outside Africa, by a significant margin. As of the 2010 census, the number of African Americans residing in New York City was over 2 million. The highest concentration of African Americans are in Brooklyn, Harlem, Queens, and The Bronx. New York City is also home to the highest number of immigrants from the Caribbean.

Since the earlier part of the 19th century, there has been a large presence of African Americans in New York City. Early Black communities were created after the state's final abolition of slavery in 1827. The metropolis quickly became home to one of the most sizable populations of emancipated African Americans. But Black men in New York did not receive voting rights equal to white men until the ratification of the Fifteenth Amendment of the US Constitution in 1870. New York City and other northern cities saw a sharp rise in their Black populations in the wake of Jim Crow in the South. In the early 1900s, many African Americans moved to Harlem, due to a number of factors, including many Black migrants relocating from the South to the North in what came to be known as the Great Migration.

New York City's Black population changed again in the 21st century. Between 2000 and 2020, many Black families left the city primarily due to the city having the highest cost of living in the nation. Many blacks leaving New York City have moved to cities in the U.S. South, including Atlanta, Charlotte, Dallas, Houston, Columbia, Jacksonville, Little Rock, Memphis, Orlando, New Orleans, Tampa, Jackson, Raleigh, Fort Worth, and San Antonio. In 2026, Mayor Zohran Mamdani spoke about the 200,000 Black residents that left New York City in the previous two decades as a "reversal of the Great Migration.”

== Demographics ==
According to the 2010 census, New York City had the largest population of Black residents of any U.S. city, with over 2 million within the city's boundaries, although this number has decreased since 2000. New York City recorded the third largest Black population decline among American cities from 2000 - 2020, registering a loss of nearly 200,000 Black residents (roughly 9% of the 2000 Black population). The driving factor for this outmigration appears to be the increasing cost of living in New York, particularly for families. Black families leaving New York are frequently drawn to places where job growth and housing is more plentiful.

The Black community consists of immigrants and their descendants from Africa and the Caribbean as well as native-born African Americans. Many of the city's Black residents live in Brooklyn, Queens, Harlem, and The Bronx. Several of the city's neighborhoods are historical birthplaces of urban Black culture in America, among them, the Brooklyn neighborhood of Bedford–Stuyvesant and Manhattan's Harlem and various sections of Eastern Queens and The Bronx. Bedford-Stuyvesant is considered to have the highest concentration of Black residents in the United States. New York City has the largest population of Black immigrants (at 686,814) and descendants of immigrants from the Caribbean (especially from Jamaica, Trinidad and Tobago, Barbados, Guyana, Belize, Grenada, and Haiti), Latin America (Afro-Latinos), and of sub-Saharan Africans. In recent decades, as Afro-Caribbean and West Indian populations in the city have shrunk, immigration from the African continent has become the primary driver of Black population growth in New York City.

The racial and ethnic makeup of Black neighborhoods in New York is also changing. From 2000 to 2010, the Black share of all residents in the average majority Black New York City neighborhood declined by 3.7 percentage points, while the share of Other (+2.4), Hispanic (+1.7), and Asian (+0.4) residents all grew, suggesting that while Black neighborhoods are becoming more diverse, they may also be losing their quintessentially Black character. As of 2010, Black-majority neighborhoods in New York continue to see higher poverty rates and lower household incomes than their white majority counterparts, but exhibit lower poverty rates and higher household incomes than Asian or Hispanic majority neighborhoods, bucking national trends. Much of this can be attributed to the unique makeup of Black New Yorkers, with New York's substantial foreign-born Black population - which tends to be wealthier than US-born Blacks - making it a relative outlier compared to other major US cities.

== Voting rights ==
For many years, New York denied universal suffrage to its Black residents. In the Constitution of New York, ratified in 1777, voting was restricted to free men, white or Black, who met the property qualifications. The updates made at the Constitutional Convention of 1821 eliminated the property requirement for white men and expanded their franchise but made an even more stringent property requirement for Black men, effectively disfranchising them. Only after the passage of the Fifteenth Amendment to the US Constitution in 1870 did Black men receive the same right to vote as white men. In the 1880s, Sarah J.S. Tompkins Garnet founded the Equal Suffrage League in Brooklyn, advocating for the right for Black women to vote. In November 1917, New York passed a suffrage amendment extending the right to vote to women in New York, three years before the Nineteenth Amendment to the US Constitution was ratified.

== History ==
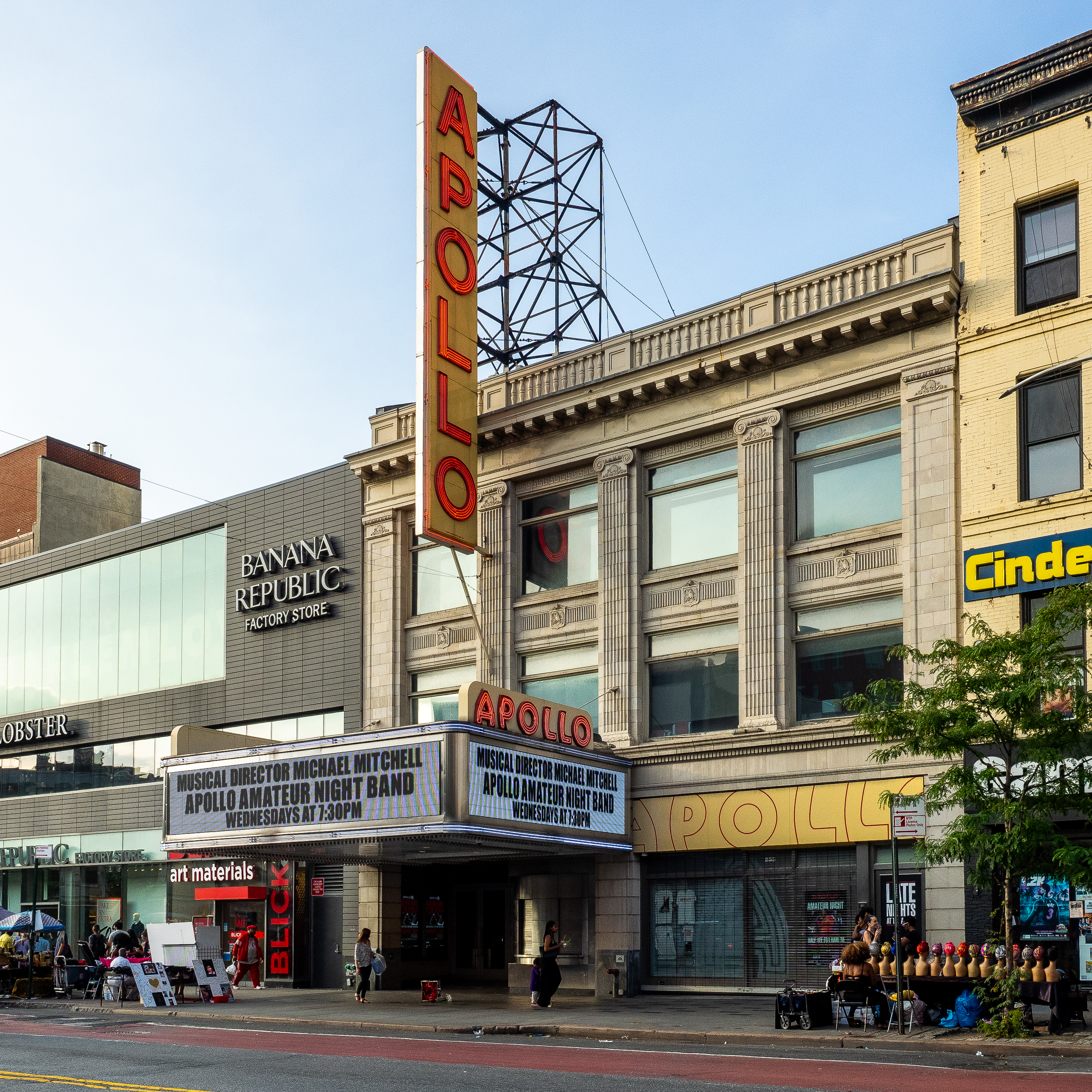
The Apollo Theater on 125th Street in Harlem is the historic nexus of African American culture.

=== Under Dutch and British rule ===
In 1626, the Dutch West India Company transported 11 abducted Africans from Angola, Sao Tome, and Congo to the Dutch settlement in New Amsterdam, in what has been acknowledged to be the beginning of the institution of slavery in New York. From that point on, the city became a critical hub of the transatlantic slave trade which would continue for centuries.

Under Dutch rule, enslaved people could obtain freedom — with conditions attached. For example, that first group of African men was able to petition the Dutch for freedom; 18 years after their arrival in New Amsterdam, they and their wives were liberated and received a parcel of land. However, their children remained enslaved, and under the terms of their release, "they had to deliver one 'fat hog' and 22.5 bushels of corn, wheat, peas, or beans to the [Dutch West India Company] every year or be re-enslaved."

By 1660, New Amsterdam was the "most important slave port in North America," having trafficked in around 4,000 Africans from Madagascar, Congo, Senegambia and more. Wall Street became a central location for slave trading.

In 1664, the English seized New Amsterdam, renaming it New York — aggressively expanding the slave trade and passing even more restrictive laws, such as the Slave Codes.

In the early 1700s, New York had one of the largest slave populations in the British colonies, amounting to 1 in 5 New Yorkers. Enslaved people in New York were conscripted into a variety of jobs, including dock workers, masons, and domestic workers. Following the 1712 Slave Rebellion, in which 23 enslaved people killed nine white people and injured six more, 70 Black people were arrested and imprisoned; 21 were eventually convicted and executed. Afterwards, even more freedoms were taken away from enslaved people (many of these laws impacted free Black people as well.) By the year 1730, 42% of New Yorkers owned slaves.

=== Abolition and 19th century life ===
The African Grove theater opened in 1821, featuring a heavily Shakespeare repertory and all-Black casts for largely Black audiences. Founded by William Alexander Brown, a ship steward and free Black man, it is widely considered the first Black theatre in the United States. In 2022, NYU's Tisch School of the Arts named their theater space — which is located at the same place as the original — The African Grove Theatre.

Seneca Village, a settlement founded by free Black Americans, was established in 1825. As many as 225 residents lived in the village, which also had multiple churches, schools, and cemeteries. In 1857, the community was destroyed to make room for Central Park. Emancipated African Americans established communities in Sandy Ground on Staten Island, and Weeksville in Brooklyn. The city was a nerve center for the abolitionist movement in the United States.

Following the full abolition of slavery in New York in 1827, New York City emerged as one of the largest pre-Civil War metropolitan concentrations of free African-Americans, and many institutions were established to advance the community. It was the site of the first African-American periodical journal Freedom's Journal, which lasted for two years and renamed The Rights of All for a third year before fading to obsolescence; the newspaper served as both a powerful voice for the abolition lobby in the United States as well as a voice of information for the African population of New York City and other metropolitan areas. The African Dorcas Association was also established to provide educational and clothing aid to Black youth in the city.

In 1850, the American League of Colored Laborers, the first Black labor union in the United States, was established in New York City.

=== Harlem and Great Migration ===
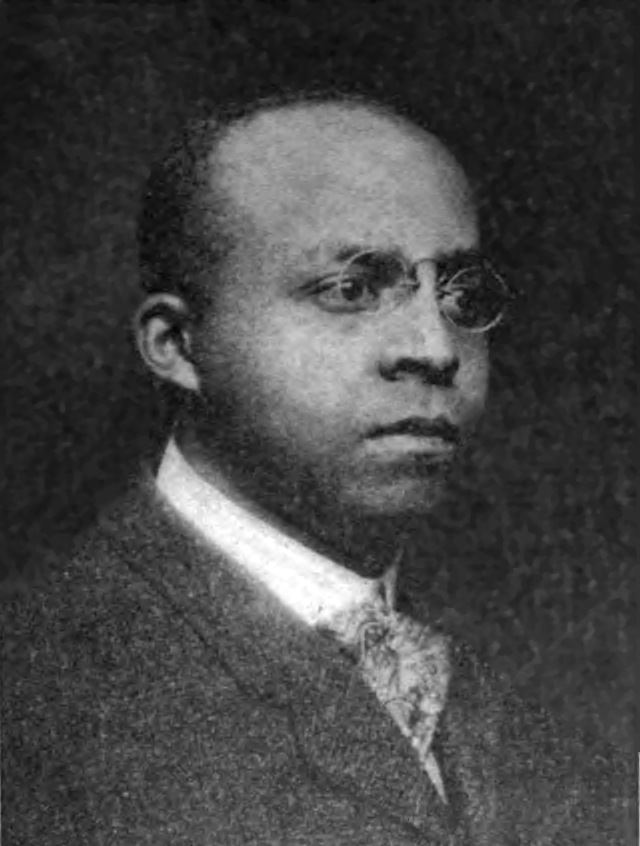
Philip A. Payton, Jr.

The violent rise of Jim Crow in the Deep and Upper South led to the mass migration of African Americans, including ex-slaves and their free-born children, from those regions to northern metropolitan areas, including New York City. Their mass arrival coincided with the transition of the center of African-American power and demography in the city from other districts of the city to Harlem.

The tipping point occurred on June 15, 1904, when up-and-coming real estate entrepreneur Philip A. Payton, Jr. established the Afro-American Realty Company, which began to aggressively buy and lease houses in the ethnically mixed but predominantly-white Harlem following the housing crashes of 1904 and 1905. In addition to an influx of long-time African-American residents from other neighborhoods, the Tenderloin, San Juan Hill (now the site of Lincoln Center), Little Africa around Minetta Lane in Greenwich Village and Hell's Kitchen in the west 40s and 50s. The move to northern Manhattan was driven in part by fears that anti-black riots such as those that had occurred in the Tenderloin in 1900 and in San Juan Hill in 1905 might recur. In addition, a number of tenements that had been occupied by blacks in the west 30s were destroyed at this time to make way for the construction of the original Penn Station.

In 1905, U.S. president Theodore Roosevelt appointed Charles William Anderson as Collector of Revenue in New York City.

=== The Great Depression and demographic shift ===
Harlem's decline as the center of the African American population in New York City began with the onset of the Great Depression in 1929. In the early 1930s, 25% of Harlemites were out of work, and employment prospects for Harlemites stayed bad for decades. Employment among black New Yorkers fell as some traditionally black businesses, including domestic service and some types of manual labor, were taken over by other ethnic groups. Major industries left New York City altogether, especially after 1950. Several riots happened in this period, including in 1935 and 1943. Following the construction of the IND Fulton Street Line in 1936, African Americans left an overcrowded Harlem for greater housing availability in Bedford–Stuyvesant. migrants from the American South brought the neighborhood's black population to around 30,000, making it the second-largest Black community in the city at the time. During World War II, the Brooklyn Navy Yard attracted many blacks to the neighborhood as an opportunity for employment, while the relatively prosperous war economy enabled many of the resident Jews and Italians to move to Queens and Long Island. By 1950, the number of blacks in Bedford–Stuyvesant had risen to 155,000, comprising about 55 percent of the population of Bedford–Stuyvesant. In the 1950s, real estate agents and speculators employed blockbusting to turn a profit. As a result, formerly middle-class white homes were being turned over to poorer Black families. By 1960, eighty-five percent of the population was Black.

== 21st century ==
=== Population decline ===
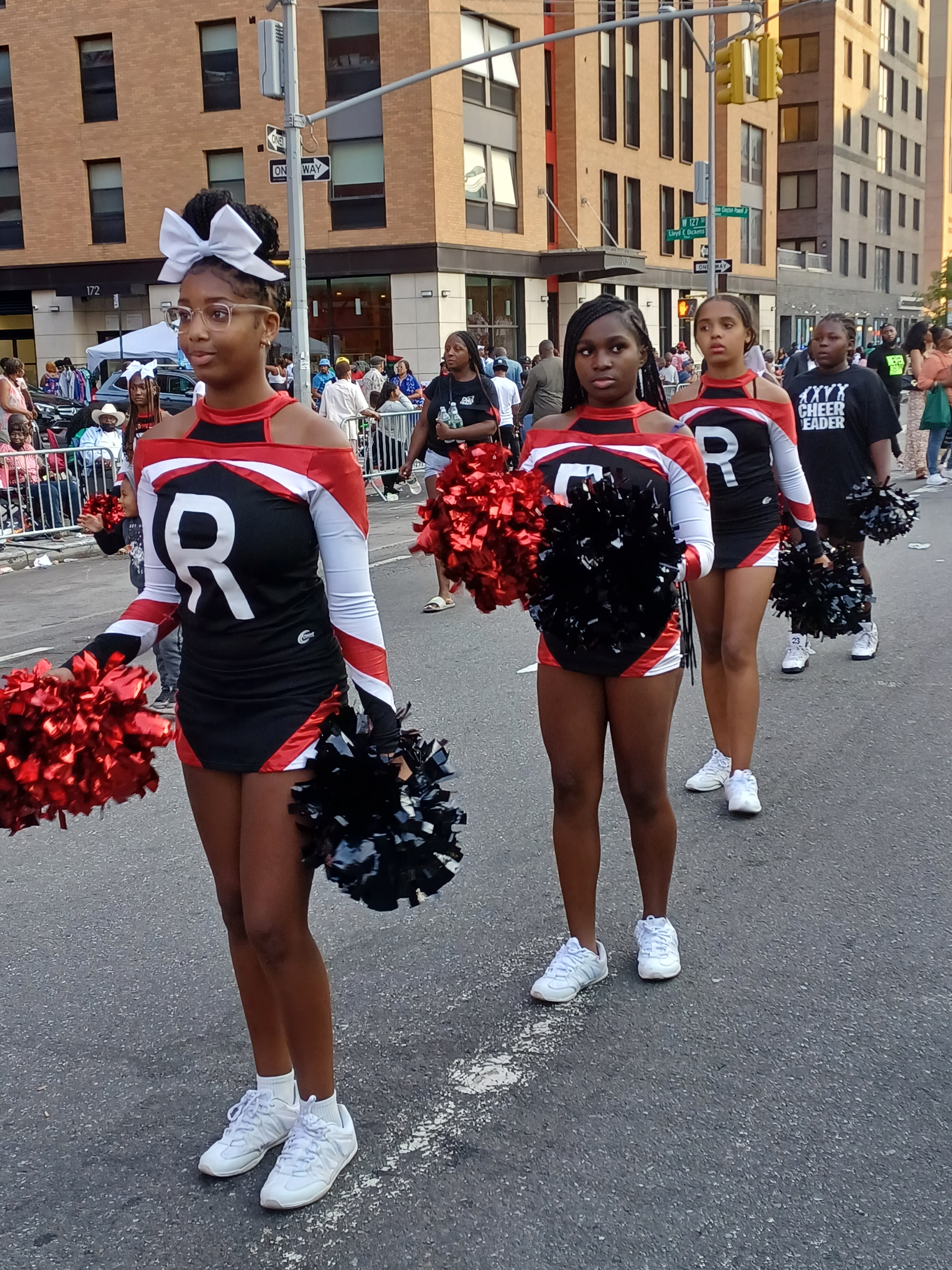
African American Day Parade in Harlem in 2022

In a reversal from the first half of the 20th century that saw scores of African Americans leaving the South for the North, between 2000 and 2020, many Black families left New York City and moved to the South. The Black population of the city over this time declined by 176,062, the third largest decrease amongst US municipalities, after Chicago and Detroit. High rents, cramped living quarters, and the city's high cost of living and raising a family were among the reasons cited for leaving. The decline was greatest among young Black populations, with the number of children, teenagers, and young Black professionals decreasing more than 19 percent in the past two decades.

=== COVID-19 pandemic ===
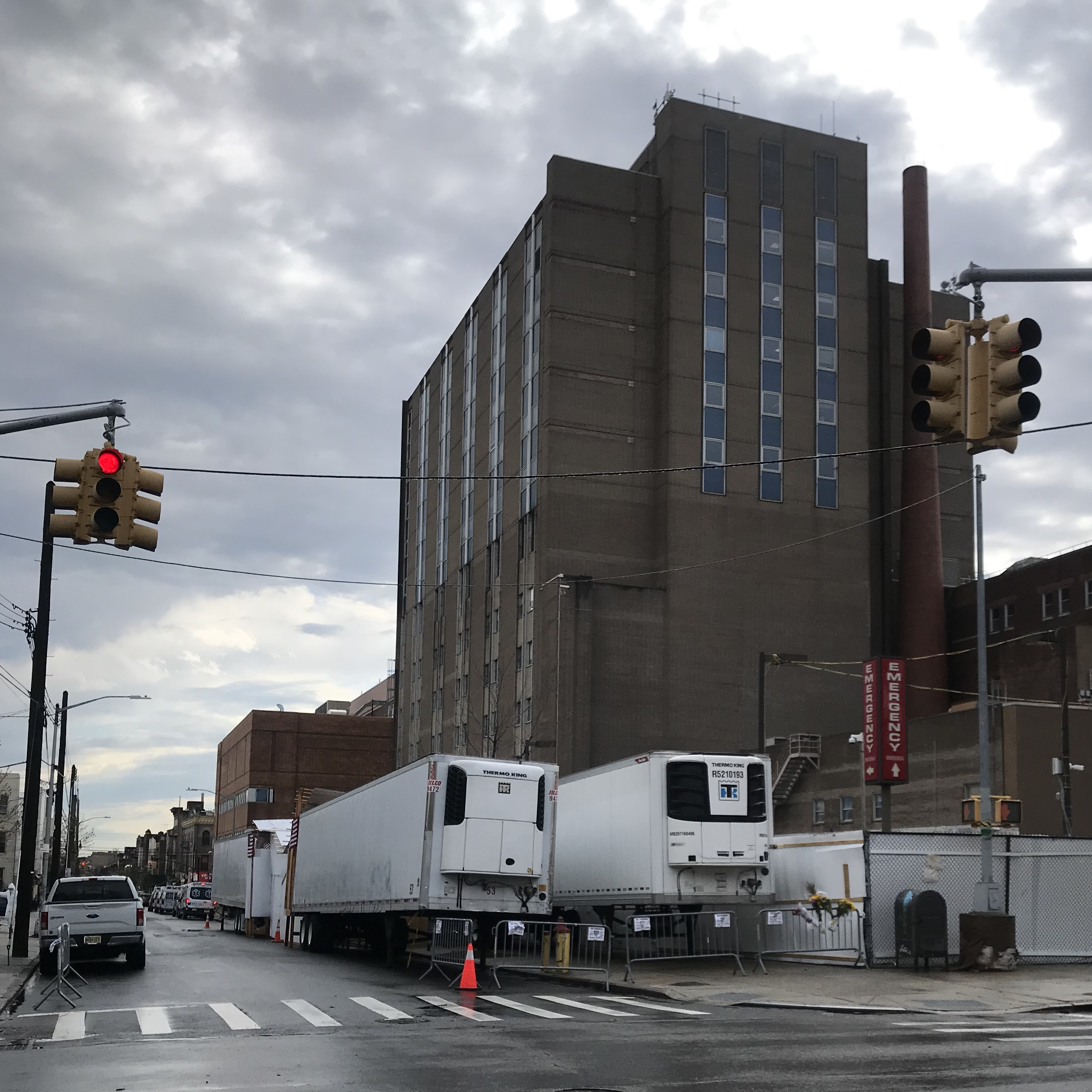
During the initial the outbreak of the COVID-19, mortuary trucks like these were used by hospitals and morgues across the city to house the dead.

The COVID-19 pandemic has disproportionately affected African Americans living inside the United States. Black Americans are more likely to contract COVID-19, more likely to be hospitalized, and more likely to die from COVID-19 than White, non-Hispanic Americans. Many Black Americans work jobs without health insurance coverage, leading to an inability to seek proper medical care when faced with a severe COVID-19 case. Furthermore, Black Americans were overrepresented in jobs labeled essential when governments began reacting to the pandemic, such as grocery store workers, transit workers, and civil jobs. This meant Black Americans continued to work jobs that posed higher risk to exposure to COVID-19.

The unique combination of stressors faced by Black people in America during the COVID-19 pandemic has put many Black social systems and crisis-meeting resources under stress. The Black church has historically been a place of community support, recognition, and social connections for African-American communities, a community that provides access to the physical, emotional, and spiritual needs that many Black Americans face systematic difficulty in attaining. The policy of social distancing as recommended for the sake of public health in COVID-19 has contributed to the hardships faced by all humans, but has affected Black Americans and their social systems especially. Black Americans that live within the poor and underserviced neighborhoods rely on complex social and religious organizations, including the Black church, to meet their physical and emotional needs. Social distancing has led to an increased difficulty in maintaining these essential social relationships, resulting in increased social isolation throughout Black communities.

Within New York City, these issues are present or intensified. The COVID-19 pandemic has revealed the long-standing systemic racism present throughout New York City's healthcare system, especially in terms of access to critical healthcare resources in underserviced, and often predominantly Black communities. This inability to properly treat affected Black residents of certain New York City zip codes is especially harsh when contrasted by the abundance of empty hospital beds and available resources of the hospitals in more affluent and well-off communities. The racial inequality between zip codes is further highlighted when examining COVID-19 testing rates, where zip codes of predominantly Black New Yorkers are at a significantly higher risk of testing positive for COVID-19. Of the ten zip codes in New York City with the highest COVID-19 death rates, eight of them are Black or Hispanic.

== Notable Black New Yorkers ==
=== 18th and 19th-centuries ===
- William Alexander Brown, playwright
- Thomas Commeraw, potter and businessman
- George T. Downing, abolitionist, and activist
- James W. C. Pennington, orator, minister, writer, and abolitionist
- Charles Bennett Ray, minister, abolitionist, newspaper editor
- Charlotte B. Ray, pastor, suffragist, and abolitionist
- Henrietta Cordelia Ray, poet and teacher
- Mary Simpson, former slave of George Washington
- James McCune Smith, physician, apothecary, abolitionist, and author
- Edward G. Walker, politician, lawyer, and leatherworker
- Theodore S. Wright, abolitionist and minister

=== 20th and 21st-centuries ===
- 50 Cent
- Kareem Abdul-Jabbar
- Eric Adams
- Ashanti
- Rochelle Aytes
- ASAP Rocky
- Essence Atkins
- James Baldwin
- Angela Bassett
- Mary J. Blige
- Foxy Brown
- Mariah Carey
- Diahann Carroll
- Shirley Chisholm
- Ruby Dee
- Mos Def
- DMX
- Yaya DaCosta
- Whoopi Goldberg
- Cuba Gooding Jr.
- James Newton Gloucester
- Lena Horne
- Anna Maria Horsford
- Ja Rule
- Jay-Z
- Alicia Keys
- KRS-One
- Sanaa Lathan
- LL Cool J
- Darryl McDaniels
- Tracy Morgan
- Eddie Murphy
- Karla Mosley
- Nas
- Lynn Nottage
- Pepa
- Ice Spice
- Joseph Simmons
- Pop Smoke
- Jurnee Smollett
- Carl Hancock Rux
- Reverend Al Sharpton
- Gabourey Sidibe
- Salt
- Tika Sumpter
- Sleepy Hallow
- Rachel True
- Cicely Tyson
- Mike Tyson
- Denzel Washington
- Keenan Ivory Wayans
- Marlon Wayans
- Shawn Wayans
- Vanessa Williams
- Wu-Tang Clan

== Accomplishments ==
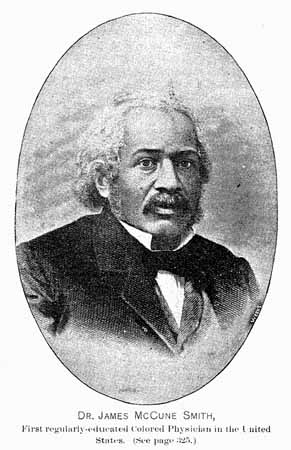
James McCune Smith, first African American to run a pharmacy in the United States

- Adam Clayton Powell Jr. - first person of African-American descent to be elected from New York to Congress; previously, the first person of African-American descent to be elected to New York City Council
- Alonzo Smythe Yerby - first black chairman of a department at the public health school, and the first black to be New York City Hospitals Commissioner, heading the city's hospitals department, namesake of the Harvard Chan Yerby Fellowship Program at the Harvard T.H. Chan School of Public Health.
- Arthur Mitchell - First African-American male dancer in a major ballet company: (New York City Ballet); also first African-American principal dancer of a major ballet company (NYCB), 1956
- Brigette A. Bryant - first woman of African-American descent to serve as Vice Chancellor of the City University of New York
- Charles H. Roberts, first of two persons of African-American descent to be elected to the New York City Board of Aldermen
- David Dinkins - first African-American mayor of New York City (1990)
- George W. Harris, first of two persons of African-American descent to be elected to the New York City Board of Aldermen
- Dr. James McCune Smith - First formally trained African-American Medical Doctor
- Letitia James - first woman of African-American descent to be elected to citywide office (New York City Public Advocate)
- Mary Pinkett, first woman of African-American descent to be elected to New York City Council
- Robert O. Lowery - first African-American fire commissioner of the New York City Fire Department and of any major U.S. City fire department
- Samuel J. Battle - first African-American police officer in the New York Police Department following consolidation of the boroughs (1911). Also the NYPD's first African-American sergeant (1926), lieutenant (1935), and parole commissioner (1941).
- Shirley Chisholm - first black woman elected to the U.S. Congress and first black candidate, male or female, for a major party's nomination for President of the United States.
- Todd Duncan - first African-American member of the New York City Opera
- Wesley Augustus Williams - first African-American officer in the New York Fire Department.
- William Grant Still's Troubled Island as performed by the New York City Opera - the first black-composed opera to be performed by a major U.S. company
- Willie Overton - first African-American police officer in present-day New York City (1891)

== See also ==
- Demographics of New York City
- History of New York City
- History of slavery in New York (state)
- Afro-Caribbean people
- Caribbean immigration to New York City
- Medgar Evers College
- Schomburg Center for Research in Black Culture
- East Coast hip hop
- Universal Hip Hop Parade
- Puerto Ricans in New York City
- Black Lives Matter protests in New York City
- Black Lives Matter art in New York City
- African American Day Parade
- Little Africa, Manhattan
- Land of the Blacks (Manhattan)
- Black Jews in New York City
- Syrian Americans in New York City
- Belarusian Americans in New York City
- Dutch Americans in New York City
- Dominicans in New York City
- Italians in New York City
- Irish Americans in New York City
- Chinese people in New York City
- Filipinos in New York City
- Japanese in New York City
- Koreans in New York City
- Russians in New York City
- Ukrainian Americans in New York City
- Jews in New York City
- Hispanics and Latinos in New York City
- Jamaicans in New York City
