= San Juan Hill, Manhattan =

Former neighborhood in New York City

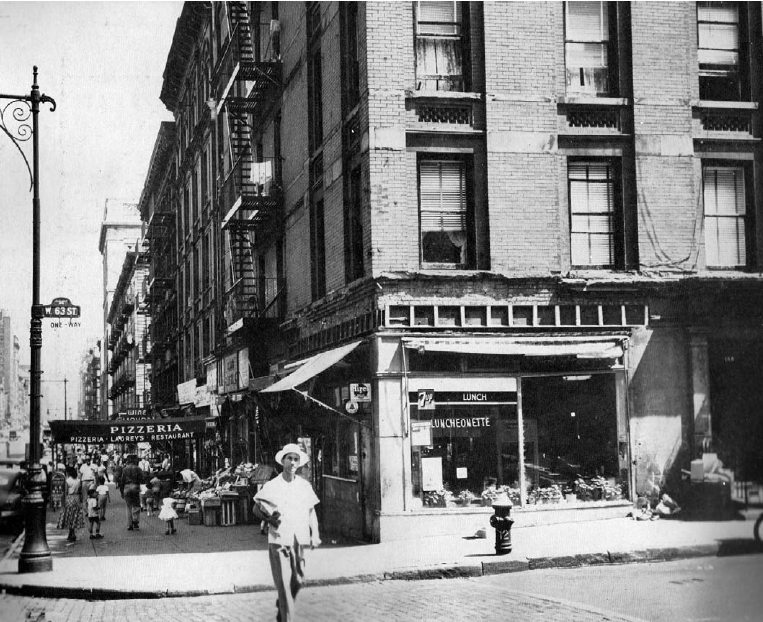
A row of residential housing and commercial establishments along 63rd Street, 1956

San Juan Hill, also called Columbus Hill, was a community in what is now the Lincoln Square neighborhood of the Upper West Side in Manhattan, New York City. Its residents were mostly African-American, Afro-Caribbean, and Puerto Rican, and comprised one of the largest African-American communities in New York before World War I. San Juan Hill was bound by 59th Street to the south, West End Avenue to the west, 65th Street to the north, and Amsterdam Avenue (part of Tenth Avenue) to the east. The site is now occupied by Lincoln Center, a 16.3-acre (6.6 ha) complex dedicated to the performing arts as well as a campus of Fordham University.

== Etymology ==
There are different opinions as to why the area was called San Juan Hill. Some critics say that it refers to the Spanish–American War of 1898 fought in Cuba. It is also said that it was because African-American veterans from the war lived in the area. Others say that the name was given to the area due to the constant ethnic gang fights between African-Americans and Irish-American gangs.

== History ==
African-Americans moved into the area around the late 19th century from Little Africa in Greenwich Village, where an earlier African-American community existed. Before the construction of Lincoln Center and the subsequent destruction of San Juan Hill, jazz and art thrived in this area as its popularity began to grow. The neighborhood had a jazz club called "Jungle Cafe" nicknamed the jungle by the members of the neighborhood. Moreover, this basement club was where the Charleston dance was reputedly born and got its start. The area's musical history continues today at Jazz at Lincoln Center. The neighborhood had many tenement basement clubs ranging from dives to higher-level clubs. And that there were also poolrooms, saloons, dance halls, and bordellos.

Before there was Harlem, there was San Juan Hill. Like Harlem, heavily populated by Black people. It was also called 'The Jungles'.

San Juan Hill had many African-American churches that, according to historian Marcy Sacks, moved into the area around the 1880s and 1890s. Among these were St. Mark's Methodist Episcopal, Mt. Olivet Baptist, as well as St. Benedict the Moor Church in neighboring Hell's Kitchen. The area had numerous community and fraternal organizations, such as the Grand United Order of Odd Fellows, Negro Elks, and the Colored Freemasons. This community also attracted war veterans returning from the Spanish- American War of 1898 which could have given rise to its name.

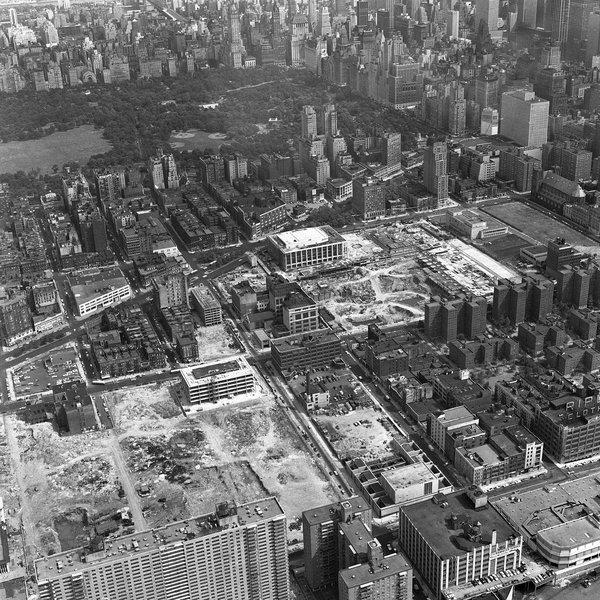
Aerial view of the construction of Lincoln Center and demolition of San Juan Hill, 1962

Between 1910 and the 1950s, there was also a Japanese American community in San Juan Hill that numbered between 2,000 and 5,000. Many were bachelor issei attracted both by the more affordable rents in the neighborhood and residential redlining elsewhere in the city. During World War II, a number of Japanese Americans were imprisoned on Ellis Island as part of the nationwide Japanese internment effort. Following the war, nearly 3,000 Japanese Americans leaving the internment camps resettled in San Juan Hill, in addition to a number of veterans of the 442nd Regimental Combat Team. Along with their African American and Puerto Rican neighbors, the Japanese American community was displaced in the 1950s to make way for Lincoln Center.

On October 8, 2022, David Geffen Hall opened with a tribute to San Juan Hill. David Geffen Hall was formerly known as Avery Fisher at Lincoln Center.

=== Displacement ===
San Juan Hill was mostly erased due to the mid-20th-century sweep of urban renewal to create Lincoln Center, displacing thousands of families, and removing the history that the neighborhood existed. In the early 20th century African-Americans started to move uptown from San Juan Hill to Harlem. The African-American population decreased while the Puerto Rican population grew. More Puerto Rican families started moving there in the 1950s coinciding with a massive influx of Puerto Rican migration after World War II. In the 1940s the neighborhood of San Juan Hill was designated as a slum and called "the worst slum district of New York City" by the New York City Housing Authority. The area had been the home of over 17,000 residents. Construction on the development project started in 1959.

Writing-off the area of San Juan Hill as a slum was the first step in a post-WWII city redevelopment scheme that would spell the end of the working-class neighborhood. Robert Moses, chairman of the Committee on Slum Clearance and leader of city urban renewal projects throughout most of the 1950s and 1960s, employed a federal statute (Title I of the Housing Act of 1949) allowing for the seizing of land in San Juan Hill under the mechanism of eminent domain to facilitate his urban renewal projects. These projects created housing for the middle class while displacing lower-income families and made room for the performing arts complex of Lincoln Center. This post-WWII transformation of San Juan Hill neighborhood is considered to be an early example of urban gentrification.

In 1947, the City of New York made San Juan Hill an area for redevelopment. Parts of San Juan Hill, from 61st to 64th Streets along Amsterdam to West End Avenues were demolished in 1947 to make way for the Amsterdam Houses project, completed in 1948. More than 1,100 families, mostly African-American and Puerto Rican, were evicted to build the Amsterdam Houses. During this time, the displacement of more than 7,000 lower-class families and 800 businesses occurred, largely because of an increase in real estate prices resulting from the ongoing renewal process. Known as the ideal tenement, Phipps was one of the last tenement buildings left standing after the demolition of San Juan Hill.

In the 1950s, the neighborhood was almost completely torn down and Lincoln Center was built. By 1955, Robert Moses struck a deal with the Met Opera to develop the neighborhood north of Columbus Circle into a home for the arts. Other organizations such as Fordham University, the New York Philharmonic, and the Juilliard School of Music soon followed suit moved their headquarters and campuses to the center.

== Legacy ==
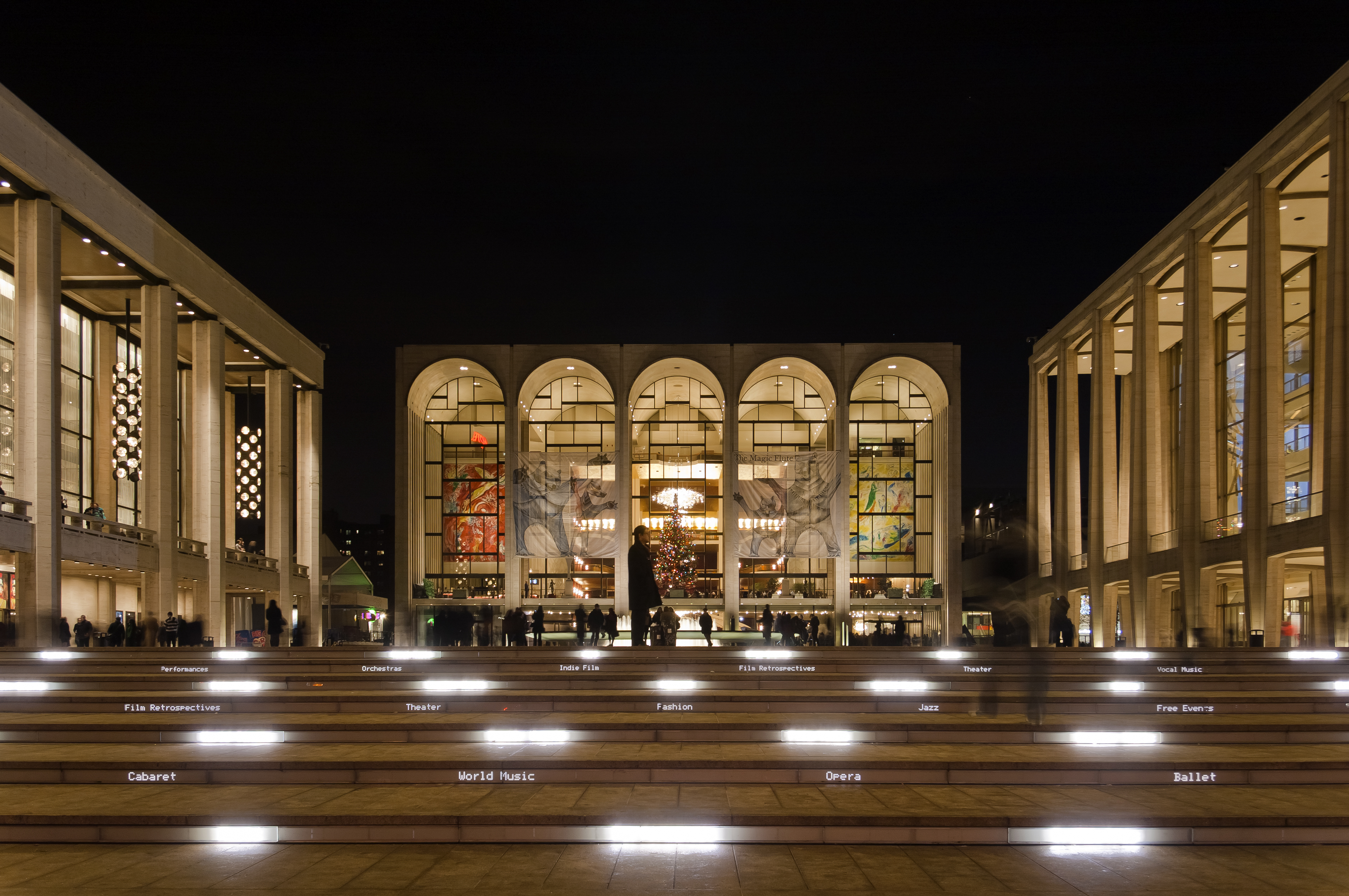
Lincoln Center in 2010

San Juan Hill was known as the birthplace of the Charleston and Bebop. Today, Lincoln Center is the home of the New York City Opera, New York Philharmonic, New York City Ballet, and the Metropolitan Opera.

New York City locations used in the musical film West Side Story (1961) feature parts of San Juan Hill following the condemning of the neighborhood's buildings; piles of debris from recently demolished buildings are prominent in many scenes. The neighborhood also serves as the setting for Steven Spielberg's 2021 remake, with the added context of the impending construction of Lincoln Center serving as a major plot point.

The neighborhood's social history, destruction and legacy are the subject of a 2024 documentary by filmmaker Stanley Nelson Jr., San Juan Hill: Manhattan's Lost Neighborhood.

== Notable residents ==
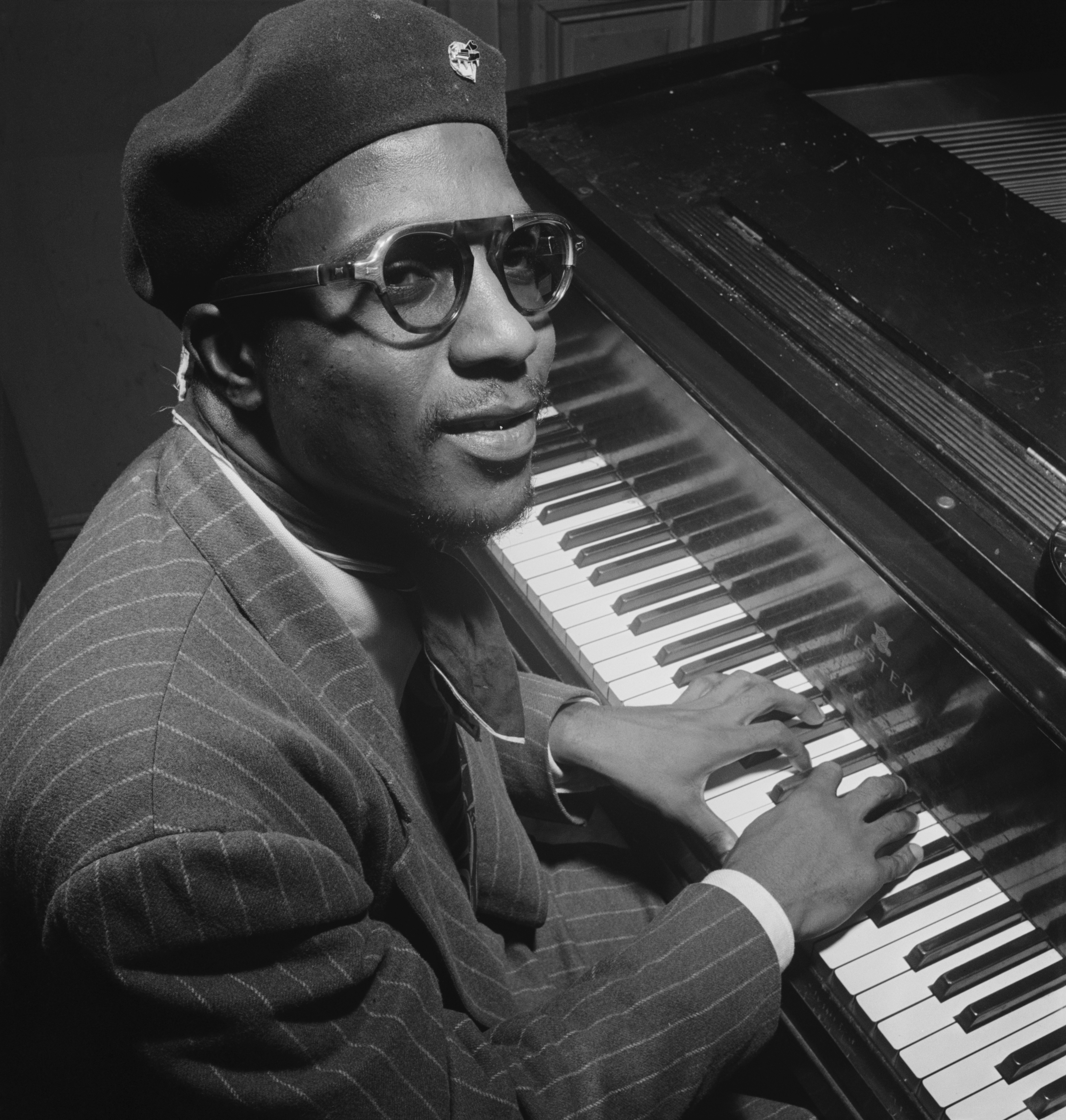
Thelonious Monk in 1947

Thelonious Monk, the jazz pianist, grew up in San Juan Hill, raised in the Phipps houses on West 63rd street. A portion of a street in the old San Juan Hill neighborhood was named after Thelonious Monk. After his death, Monk's family created the Thelonious Monk Foundation to help improve music education throughout the United States. Jazz pianist Herbie Nichols was also born in the neighborhood, and became a friend of Monk later in life.

Pianist James P. Johnson, one of the pioneers of the stride style of piano playing family moved to San Juan Hill in 1908. Johnson composed the Roaring Twenties popular song "Charleston". Willie "The Lion" Smith, Luckey Roberts, were co-pioneers in the creation of the stride piano technique. Notable historian Arturo Schomburg, of the Schomburg Center for Research in Black Culture, lived in San Juan Hill with his first wife and 3 sons.

Barbara Hillary, the first African-American woman to reach the North Pole, and then the first African-American woman to reach the South Pole, and therefore the first African-American woman to have reached both poles, was born in the neighborhood.
