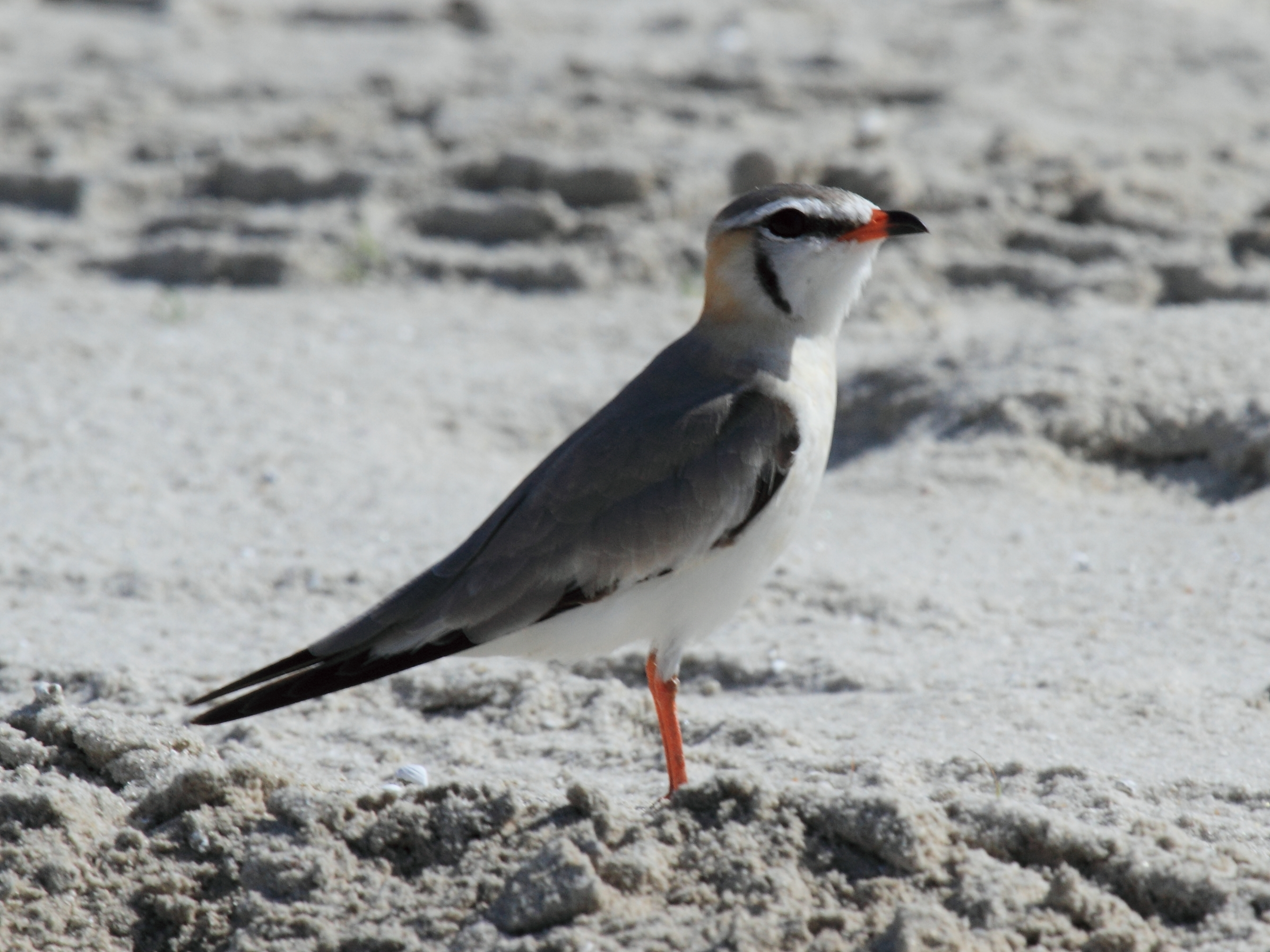

Conservation status
- Least Concern (IUCN 3.1)

Scientific classification
- Kingdom: Animalia
- Phylum: Chordata
- Class: Aves
- Order: Charadriiformes
- Family: Glareolidae
- Genus: Glareola
- Species: G. cinerea

Binomial name
- Glareola cinerea Fraser, 1843

= Grey pratincole =

Species of bird

The grey pratincole (Glareola cinerea), sometimes known as the cream-coloured pratincole, is a species of Old World shorebird in the pratincole and courser family, Glareolidae. They are a small, compact, elegant pratincole identifiable from similar species by their pale grey colour and distinct head pattern: white stripe above eye, black stripe through the eye, pale chestnut nape. They are found along rivers and coastal areas, with a fairly large distribution within Western and Central Africa. They are considered an intra-African migrant, dispersing from their breeding grounds when rain or drought makes them uninhabitable.

== Taxonomy and systematics ==
The grey pratincole is a member of the pratincole and courser family, Glareolidae, within the pratincole subfamily, Glareolinae. In general, Glareolinae species are characterised as having short bills with a broad gape, long pointed wings, and fairly short legs. They are known for acrobatically hunting insects in flight in a similar manner to terns or swallows.

The Glareolidae family is thought to have originated in Africa and later spread into Eurasia and Australasia. This is supported by the close relationships and similar ecologies between African and Indian species. Namely, the grey pratincole’s closest relative is the small pratincole (Glareola lactea) in Asia, with the superspecies pair being called the “small riverine pratincoles”.

The grey pratincole is a member of the typical pratincoles (genus Glareola): a genus of 7 to 8 closely-related species. The grey pratincole was first described by Fraser in 1843 under its current scientific name Glareola cinerea. Occasionally, the grey pratincole is placed in the genus Galachrysia with the rock pratincole (G. nuchalis) and the small pratincole (G. lactea); however, this genus has been folded into the broader genus Glareola in the majority of modern ornithological taxonomies. This classification was originally created to separate pratincole species that were smaller with shorter wings and less deeply forked tails.

Currently, the grey pratincole is treated as a monotypic species; however, grey pratincoles from the upper Niger River with more rufous on their nape and breast may warrant subspecies designation as race colorata.

=== Etymology ===
The genus name Glareola is a diminutive of Latin word glarea, meaning "gravel", which is likely a broad reference to waterside habitat. The species epithet cinerea derives from the Latin word cinereus, meaning ash-grey or ash-coloured, referring to the pale grey colour of the grey pratincole.

== Description ==
=== Identification ===
Like other pratincoles, grey pratincoles have the appearance of a tern-like wader, with very long wings and relatively short legs. The grey pratincole is small, measuring 18 to 20 cm long and weighing about 37 g. They are identifiable by their pale grey colour on their back and distinct head pattern: thin white stripe above the eye (i.e., supercilium), black eyestripe curving down behind the eye, pale rufous nape. The buffy colour on their nape can sometimes extend to their breast and upper belly, though they are largely white on their underside. Their bill is black with a red base, and their legs are red. Grey pratincoles have striking white rump and a unique tail pattern exclusively visible in flight: black with white sides and base, and slightly forked. Their primary flight feathers are black with a white patch, and their secondaries are white with a black trailing edge. In flight, their underwings are mostly white, with black and white pattern on their primary feathers. Their flight is buoyant and tern-like, with deep wingbeats countered with periods of agile gliding, allowing them to catch insects in the air. As juveniles, the plumage of grey pratincoles is scaled black and buff on their upper parts, without the presence of black markings on their face and with the tip of their tail mottled black and buff.

=== Similar species ===
The grey pratincole is similar in appearance to the small pratincole (Glareola lactea) and the rock pratincole (Glareola nuchalis). The grey pratincole differs in appearance from both of these species by its head pattern (white supercilium), largely white underwing, and paler colour. As well, the grey pratincole is entirely allopatric with the small pratincole, with the latter native to Asia. Additionally, the grey pratincole also resembles the Egyptian plover (Pluvianus aegyptius) in flight, but can be distinguished by its paler head and facial pattern. Egyptian plovers also tend to fly directly and low over water unlike the grey pratincole’s much more buoyant flight.

=== Vocalisation ===
As a gregarious species, grey pratincoles are known to be strongly vocal, particularly when flying in groups. They have a high-pitched, trilling call that accelerates and then decelerates (“tre-tre-tretretretretret-teet-teet–teet”). They also have an alarm call composed of a modulated series of notes (“tie-tie-tie”) or a sharp “tic-tic-tic”.

== Distribution and habitat ==
Grey pratincoles are distributed in the Afrotropical region of Western and Central Africa. They are primarily found along rivers and coasts from Mali and Niger to Ghana, Cameroon, western Democratic Republic of the Congo, and northwestern Angola. They have been recorded as native residents in the following countries: Angola, Benin, Burkina Faso, Cameroon, Central African Republic, Chad, Republic of the Congo, Democratic Republic of Congo, Equatorial Guinea, Gabon, Mali, Niger, and Nigeria. They have also been documented in Ghana and Togo in the non-breeding season, and are considered a vagrant to these countries. Furthermore, it is uncertain whether recent records in Burundi and Uganda represent vagrants or small outlying populations.

Grey pratincoles are found in coastal areas and inland rivers, with a preference for sandbanks along large, slow-flowing rivers as well as lakes in both forested and open areas. When rivers flood and water levels are high, they can be found in reservoirs and coastal habitats, and occasionally mangroves and estuaries. Sandbars are their preferred breeding habitat.

== Behaviour and ecology ==
=== Movement ===
The grey pratincole is considered an intra-African migrant (or a partial migrant and disperser). Their movements are largely nomadic or dispersal-based, driven by changing habitat availability as a result of varying water levels. During the rainy season when large rivers flood, grey pratincoles lose access to the sandbanks around large rivers and disperse to smaller rivers and coastal areas. In particular, when rivers flood in West Africa post-breeding season, they are known to disperse into Nigeria and Lake Chad among other locations, gathering in flocks of 300 to 500 at Lake Chad and in coastal habitats by Lagos, Nigeria.

=== Breeding ===
Grey pratincoles nest on the ground on open sandbanks near water—preferably, the water of large, slow-flowing rivers. They nest when rivers are at their lowest, and their nest consists of a shallow scrape (8 cm in diameter) in the sand of a sandbar or on a shingle beach, typically within 100 m of water. Grey pratincoles lay eggs from March to May in Niger, March to June in Nigeria, February in Gabon, February to March and June to August in the Democratic Republic of the Congo—the latter suggesting that they may have two breeding periods. In a single clutch, they lay 1 to 2 cryptic eggs. Egg size ranges from 25–28 mm × 20–22 mm, and egg colour ranges from cream to buff spotted and mottled olive-brown and stone-grey. Grey pratincole chicks are pale, sandy grey with small black markings on the upper parts and white on their under parts. Chicks are precocial, though they are still fed by the parents during the first few days or weeks of life. The role of parents during the breeding season is still fairly unknown in this species.

Like all pratincoles, grey pratincoles are fairly conspicuous and will breed in loose colonies, with nests only a few meters apart. In breeding colonies, adult birds will co-operate to defend against predation, such as loudly attacking birds of prey to force them away. Pratincoles will often feign injury to lure intruders, including humans, away from their nests.

=== Food and feeding ===
Like all pratincoles, grey pratincoles are insectivorous and will primarily feed on insects in flight, though they will also forage on the ground as well. They are crepuscular foragers, being most active at dawn and dusk while spending the hottest times of the day resting on sandbanks, where they are extremely well-camouflaged. To forage, grey pratincoles will hunt insects in flight over water, grassland, or woodland. They are known to forage socially in swooping, acrobatic, flight.

As a family, Glareolidae species mainly feed on insects, with a preference for larger insects such as locusts and beetles. Grey pratincoles are opportunistic, and tend to take advantage of temporarily swarming insects with a preference for winged termites that emerge en masse before rain, and also consuming other arthropods on occasion. Their diet consists of flies, beetles, small grasshoppers and spiders. Chicks can be fed on insect larvae. All pratincole species are known to drink frequently, despite having nasal glands for salt excretion.

=== Social behaviour ===
Grey pratincoles are highly social, both during the breeding and non-breeding period. They are known to associate with skimmers (Rynchops spp.), terns (subfamily: Sternidae), and Egyptian plovers (Pluvianus aegyptius) when nesting. Outside of the breeding season, flocks will mix with other species of waterbirds (terns, plovers, other Charadriiformes).

=== Threats ===
Grey pratincoles are locally abundant and not globally threatened, and are not known to be under any immediate threat except maybe where they are less abundant; however, they are still vulnerable to human disturbance. As river-dwelling pratincoles, grey pratincoles are particularly threatened by the damming of Africa’s rivers. Damming leads to the flooding of their breeding habitat above the dam, and unpredictable flood regimes below the dam. For example, the creation of Lake Volta in Ghana destroyed available sandbar habitat and led to the exodus of grey pratincoles from the country.

== Relationship to humans ==
Pratincoles generally hold aesthetic value for birdwatchers, and thereby play a role in ecotourism. Grey pratincoles are notoriously tame, which further increases their appeal to birdwatchers.

== Status ==
Though their overall population appears to be decreasing, grey pratincoles are not globally threatened, and are listed as “Least Concern” by the International Union for Conservation of Nature (IUCN) Red List. This listing is justified by the fact that their decline is not thought to be rapid enough to meet the threshold for “Vulnerable” under the population trend criterion (i.e., over 30% decline over ten years or three generations). The global population size of grey pratincoles is estimated to be between 10,000 and 25,000 mature individuals.

The only conservation measures currently in place for this species are that they have conservation sites identified over their entire range and that they are recognised in international legislation.
