= Cross-regional relations between North and Sub-Saharan Africa =

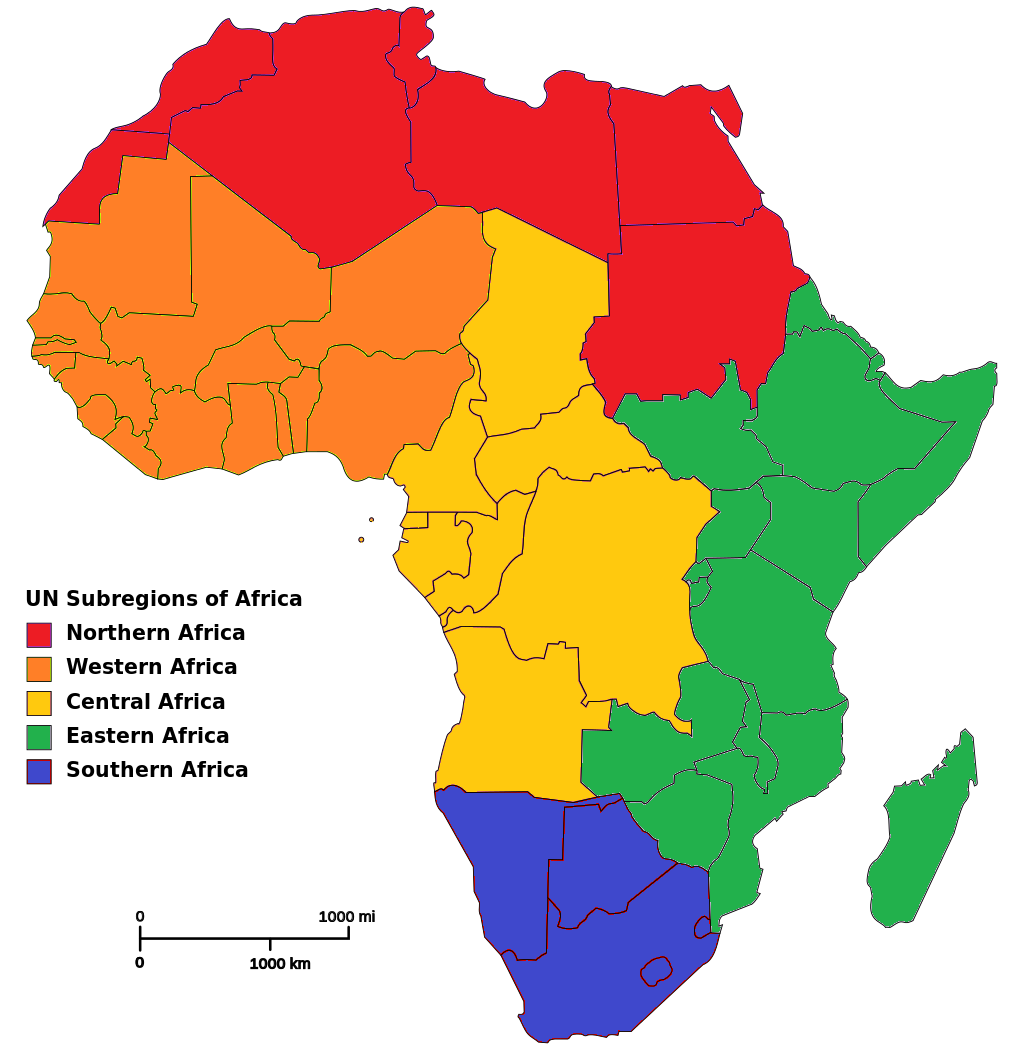
Regional divides in Africa, as defined by the United Nations (subject to dispute)

North Africa and the rest of Africa are two distinct yet interconnected regions that share a multitude of cultural, religious, economic, migrational, political, and other societal components that affect the relations between the two regions. While there is not one singular standardized definition as to which countries constitute either region, North Africa is broadly defined as the northern portion of Africa encompassing Morocco, Algeria, Tunisia, Libya, and Egypt, with Sahrawi Arab Democratic Republic and Sudan sometimes included. In contrast, sub-Saharan Africa generally refers to the states and territories which lie fully or partially to the south of the Sahara. The shared ties between both regions derive from a variety of elements, including: traditional religious and cultural linkages, joint economic and developmental interests, intra-regional migration between countries of both areas, and evolving political and diplomatic relations between states.

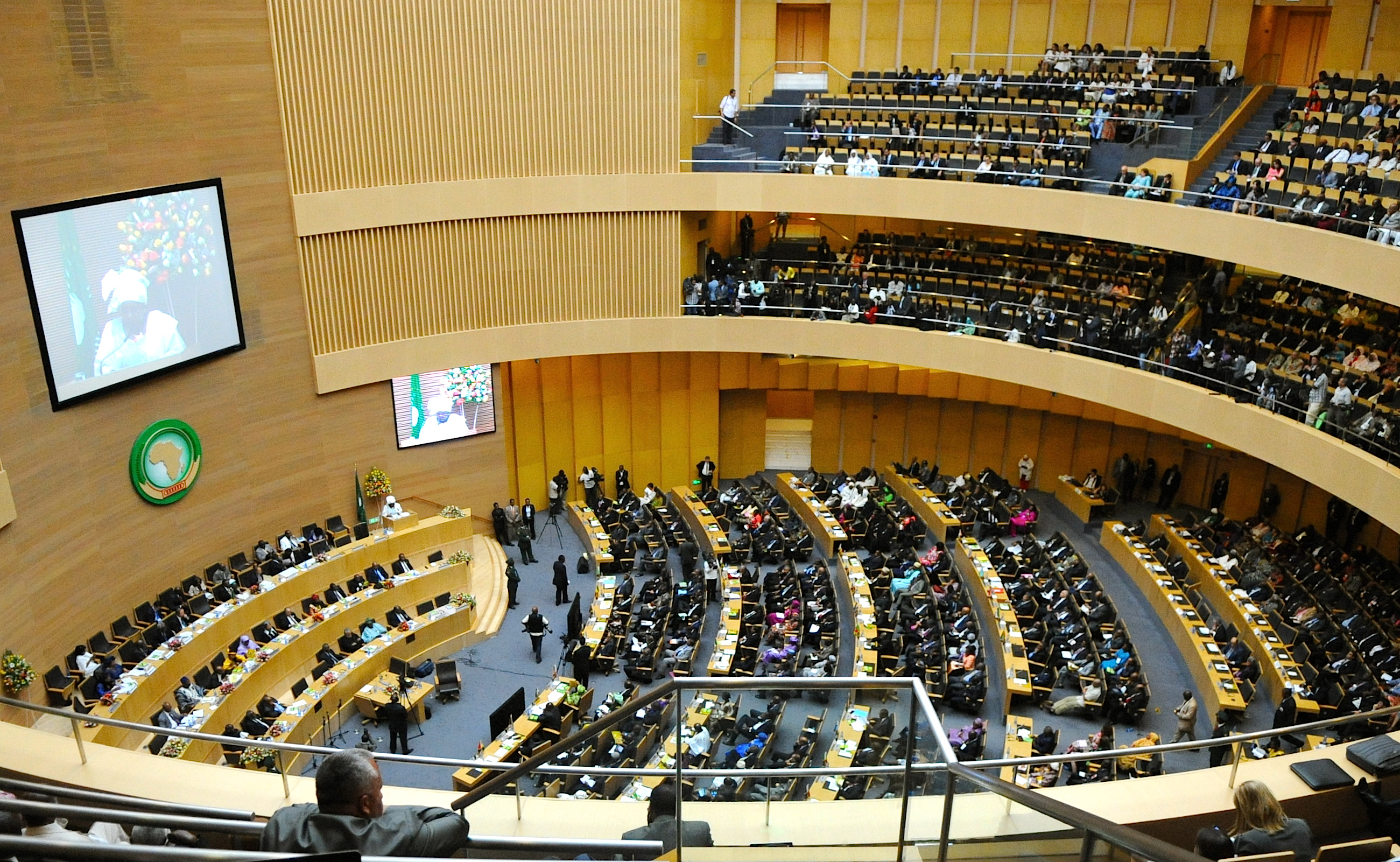
50th Anniversary African Union Summit in Addis Ababa, Ethiopia

Traditionally considered by scholars to be two discrete entities—with North Africa commonly studied alongside the Middle East as the MENA region—recent scholarship has reexamined the impact and influence both regions bear on one another, particularly within the context of contemporary events and affairs. This has contributed to an overall shift in pan-Africanist discourse and dialogue in recent decades, with a more inclusively transcontinental view being incrementally adopted within mainstream academia. Such scholarly perspectives align with historical data that indicates both entities as intricately related spheres with shared histories of cultural diffusion and population exchange.

However, on a popular level, this transcontinental view of pan-Africanism has been met with certain resistance, particularly from North Africans and members of distinct ethnic minority groups, many of whom view themselves as unique from their sub-Saharan or ethnic-majority counterparts. However, such systemic exchanges between North and sub-Saharan African countries have diminished this stark line of demarcation over time, illustrating the complexity of the relationship between both regions. This phenomenon can particularly be explicitly observed in the case of sub-Saharan African countries bordering North Africa, such as those located within the Sahel region and within East Africa. Levels of integration between both regions have evolved over time, with current, overarching international relations objectives between states in the two regions formalizing and cementing these relationships.

== Religion, Culture, and Society ==
=== Islamic Identity ===
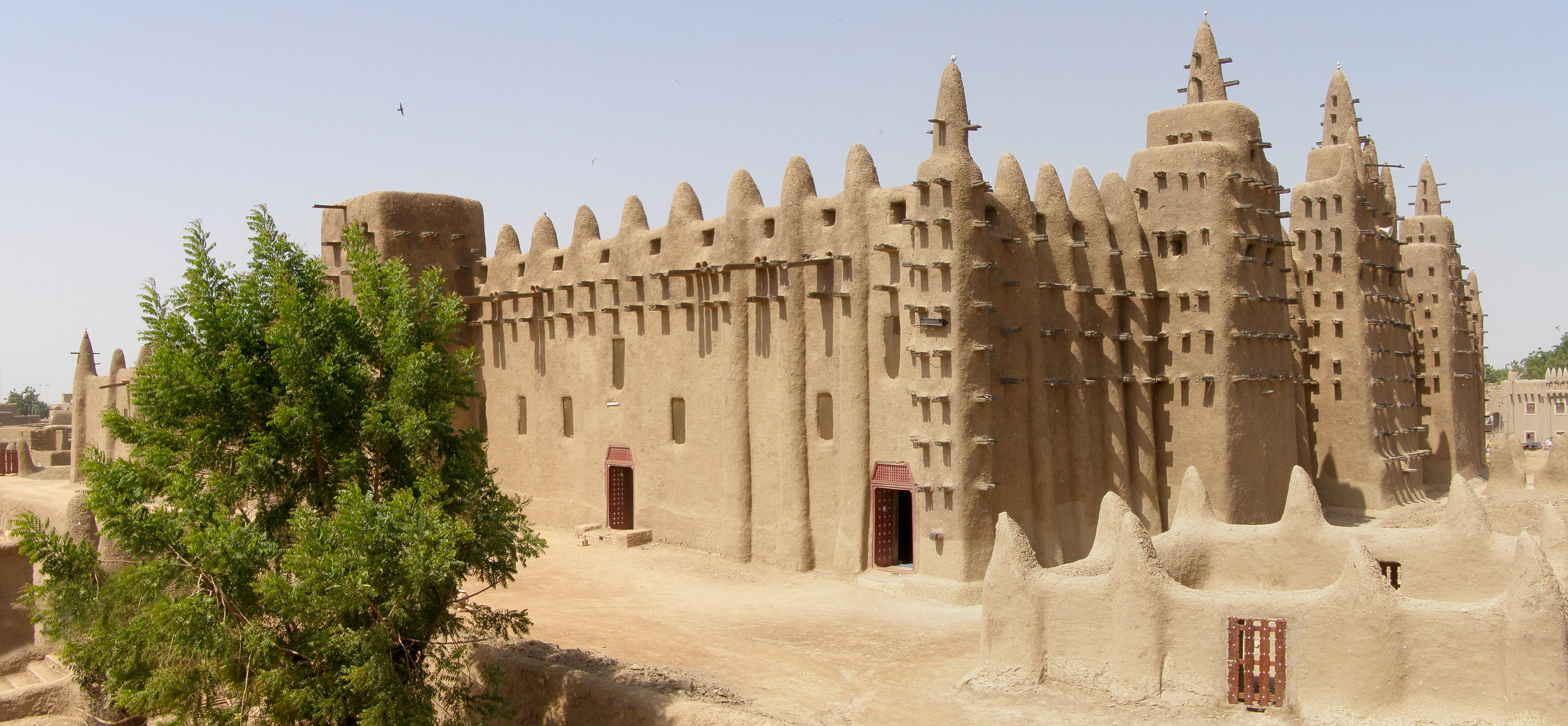
The Great Mosque of Djenné, constructed in a Sudano-Sahelian architectural style, located in Mali

In the 7th century CE, North Africa was conquered by Muslim Arabs, providing the context in which Islam would eventually spread throughout sub-Saharan African populations—particularly those in East and West Africa—in succeeding centuries through their subsequent exposure to the Islamized Berber merchants, scholars, and clerics of North Africa. Conversions to Islam accelerated during the invasion of the Almoravids, a Berber nomadic group, which sparked a wave of Islamic conversion in the Ghana Empire in the 11th century. Islam is considered to have spread throughout Africa in a generally peaceful, gradual, and asymmetric fashion, with the exception of a limited amount of military campaigns and violent conflict. In many instances, the adoption of Islam was incentivized due to its advantage as beneficial to trade with the Arabs.

It was in this regard that Islam in Africa evolved to co-opt and exist in parallel to an assortment of different traditional practices and rituals indigenous to the various locale where it was adopted. One such case would be that of Koumbi Saleh, the capital of the Ghana Empire, which was split into two discrete towns in the middle of the 11th century, one of which was predominantly Muslim and had twelve mosques while the other possessed traditional animist shrines. Broadly speaking, African artistry also adapted to Islamic influence, with the construction of mosques with elaborate geometric patterns, the importation of North African weaving techniques, and the replacement of traditional talismans for Quranic amulets.

=== Linguistic Ties ===
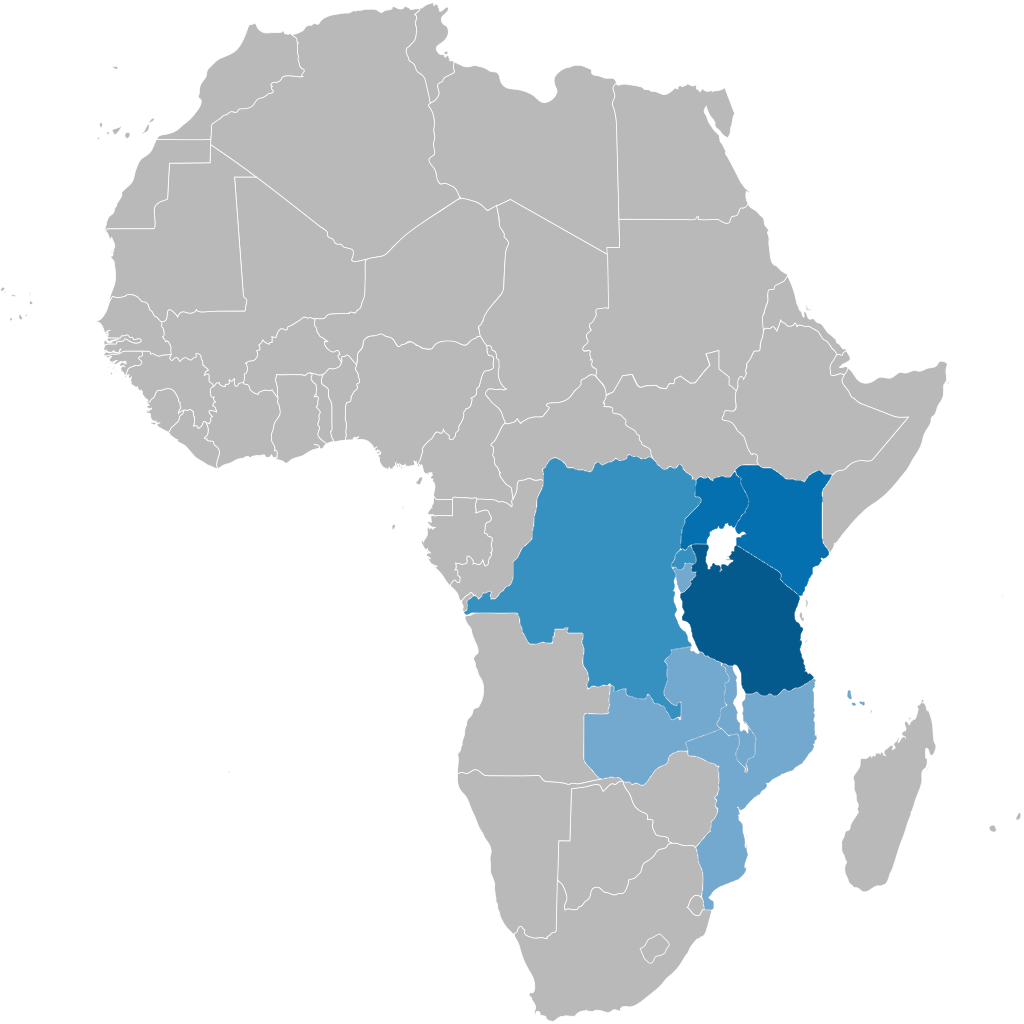
Distribution of Swahili speakers

Arabic is one of the most widespread languages in Africa, with a large degree of internal diversity between its many dialects. Some examples of predominant African Arabic dialects include North African, Egyptian, and Sudanese. It is also a minority language in a variety of sub-Saharan African countries, such as Nigeria, Chad, and Eritrea. This is reflective of its nature as a language that bears a high degree of interconnection with Islamic culture and traditions.

In the middle of the 8th Century, Muslim merchants hailing from Arabia and Egypt initiated permanent settlements alongside pre-existing towns and trade centers on the Swahili coast. The interaction and intermarriage of these Arabs with the indigenous Bantu peoples eventually led to the formation of a quasi-creolized culture unique to the Swahili coast. Central to this identity was not only the Islamic faith, but also the mixture of Arabic into local Bantu linguistic dialects to create the pidgin language of Swahili.

French is another major language shared between several countries of both respective regions, such as Algeria, Tunisia, Ivory Coast, Senegal, and the Democratic Republic of the Congo. According to the French-language organization of La Francophonie, 85% of French speakers worldwide could possibly reside in Africa by the year 2050. This is largely due to the colonial legacy of France in both North and West Africa and the comparatively high birth rates of these Francophone African countries. Citizens within non-Francophone African have also sought to learn French as a secondary or tertiary language. This has enabled the French language to act as a lingua franca between people from different countries in North and sub-Saharan Africa.

== Economic Ties ==
African Union flag

North and sub-Saharan Africa share an extensive historical background of trade and commerce dating back over a thousand years to the trading networks of Arab merchants. This tradition of economic transaction between neighboring countries on the continent has accrued a renewed significance in the modern era as the formation of regional economic communities and shared developmental interests take precedence in contemporary African affairs.

=== The African Union ===
The predecessor of the modern African Union (AU) was an alliance of African states that sought to cooperate on the basis of their shared interests as newly decolonized and independent governing entities. It was inspired by anti-colonialist and pan-Africanist sentiment that was prevalent during the early 1960s, as African countries gained independence from European imperial powers. It was forged by the marginalization of Africa in the global sphere, an enthusiasm which can be traced back to the 19th century. This group, the Organization of African Unity (OAU), was formed in 1963 upon the convening of thirty-two heads of state in Addis Ababa, Ethiopia. The OAU sought to promote solidarity amongst African states in achieving their ambitions in eradicating colonialism, defending territorial sovereignty, and pursuing a better life for all the peoples of Africa. In a similar respect, the aims and objectives of the African Union are commonly regarded as also based upon the premise of pan-Africanist sentiment, such as through its goals pertaining to achieving greater political coordination and socioeconomic integration between its fifty-five member states.

While Pan-Africanism can be construed to signify Black unity in sub-Saharan Africa in particular, it has also been embraced by non-Black Africans. One such supporter of this political philosophy and of the further integration of the continent was Muammar al-Gaddafi of Libya, who pivoted his pan-Arabist sentiment to forge deeper relations with his African counterparts through increased participation in the African Union. This lies in contrast to other North African countries’ relationships with the AU, such as Morocco, which left the organization for 33 years before rejoining due to its recognition of an independent Western Sahara. The AU has also notably conducted cross-regional cooperation by placing an emphasis on membership in and coordination between smaller regional economic organizations, such as the Arab Maghreb Union and the Economic Community of West African States.

==== Interregional Unions ====
Regional Economic Communities (RECs) are regional organizations of African states that were established by the 1980 Lagos Plan of Action and recognized by the African Union. The primary intent of these groups is to better facilitate regional economic integration amongst the members of the various subregions of Africa and to strengthen the broader African Economic Community (AEC), which itself was established in 1991 under the Abuja Treaty. These act as fundamental pillars towards the furtherance of the integration of the continent.

Pan-African flag and colors

The eight RECs currently recognized by the AU include:

- the Arab Maghreb Union (AMU)
- the Common Market for Eastern and Southern Africa (COMESA)
- the Community of Sahel-Saharan States (CEN-SAD)
- the East African Community (EAC)
- the Economic Community of Central African States (ECCAS)
- the Economic Community of West African States (ECOWAS)
- the Intergovernmental Authority on Development (IGAD)
- the Southern Africa Development Community (SADC)

== Inter-Regional Migration ==
=== Migratory Patterns and Trends ===
Statistical surveys indicate that over one in three Africans have considered emigration from their current point of origin. Research performed by pan-African survey network Afrobarometer depicted that Africans that were most likely to desire emigration were on average young adults and those who possessed higher levels of education, such as secondary- and post-secondary-level qualifications. Additionally, men are more likely than women to migrate, with only 17% of inter-African migrants being women. The most frequent migratory destinations for African emigrants were those located within the continent, particularly within the similar geographic region or elsewhere in Africa. In fact, more than 80% of African migration occurs within the continent.

==== Motivating Factors ====
A complex multitude of variables precipitate the circumstances in which many Africans ultimately decide to migrate elsewhere, and are not solely limited to proximate causes. Amongst the leading factors cited by surveyed respondents as reasons for which they sought to emigrate were those pertaining to advancing economic prospects or avoiding financial hardship. Roughly 44% of respondents indicated that they were “looking for work,” while 29% noted that they were “escaping poverty and economic hardship.” Studies performed by Afrobarometer discovered that one in five surveyed Africans rely at least in part on cash remittances sent to them by family members residing abroad, and that approximately 25% of those surveyed has had at least one family member residing abroad within the last three years.

Despite popular conception and common media portrayal, the vast majority of African migrants immigrate elsewhere within the continent. Between the years 2015 to 2017, the amount of Africans residing outside the continent only increased by a small margin of a million, compared to an increase of 3 million of those living elsewhere within the region. These figures illustrate how inter-regional migration has outpaced extra-regional migration within the past decade.

=== Contemporary Issues and Impact ===
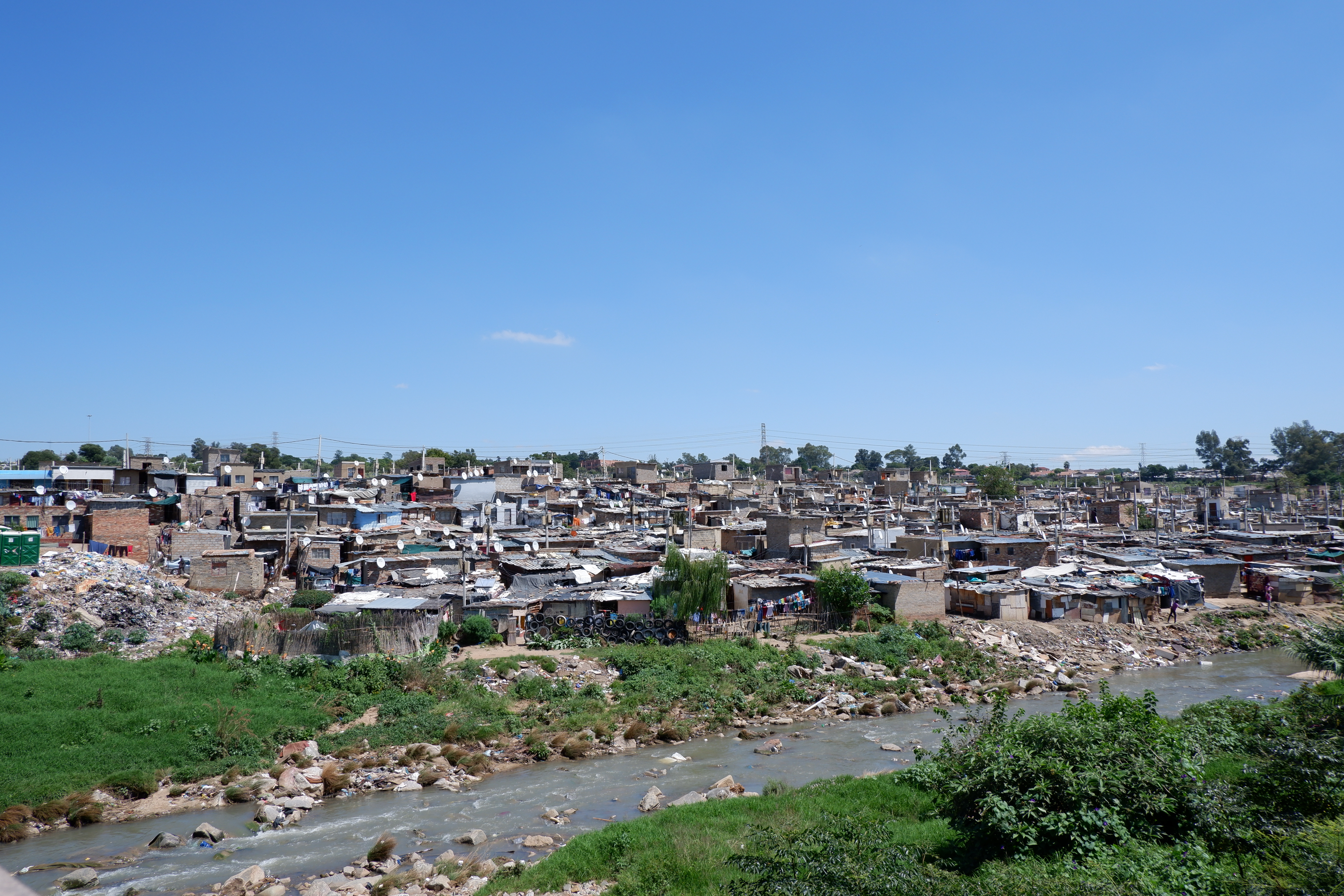
Migrant settlement in South Africa

Inter-regional migrants in Africa may face a litany of logistical issues at any stage of their migration process. One prescient issue facing most Africans seeking to immigrate is the restriction of their mobility on the basis of restrictive visa requirements and other legal obstacles. According to the 2018 Henley and Partners Passport Index, only three African countries rank within the world's most mobile passports. This is in turn reflective of the developmental status of states, with more affluent nations on average ranking higher on the passport mobility index. Thus, migration for those from developing nations is significantly more difficult. In the context of intercontinental migration in Africa, which is fueled predominantly by economic motivations or political strife, this emphasizes the degree of coordination amongst states in addressing cross-regional migration. In absence of such provisions, illegal migration and human trafficking networks may flourish as a result of a lack of legal means to migrate.

While net immigration plays an impactful role in the economic development of recipient countries, very few countries have implemented concrete structural policy frameworks from which to handle their migrant populations. These nations are thus rendered unable to fully take advantage of this supplementary workforce due to factors such as the existence of a highly prevalent informal economic sector, inadequate labor management practices, and a widespread lack of labor regulations. This includes immigration to North African countries that are comparatively wealthier to their sub-Saharan counterparts, such as Egypt, Algeria, and Morocco. Preliminary research indicates that improved developmental results correlate with better social welfare networks for migrant laborers.

This bears significant impact for cross-regional integration as one of the stated aims of the African Economic Community and its member states is to create provisions for the enactment of free movement between countries and regions in Africa. In 2018, the African Union adopted a continent-wide free trade agreement that stipulated the free movement of persons. It stipulates three progressive stages of implementation, which include the abolition of visa restrictions and the special provision of movement for border communities, students, and researchers. It also entails provisions to ensure the protection of migrants so that they are not exploited. However, the African Union Free Movement Protocol had only been ratified by four member states and still faces substantial challenges in its adoption and implementation across the continent.

== Political and Diplomatic Relations ==
In the 21st century, emerging problems shared between African states from both North and sub-Saharan Africa have enabled these two regions to reassess their relationship with one another. Some of the most pressing issues for countries across Africa to address in the coming decades include international water usage rights, the impact of climate change on agriculture and the economy, and addressing transnational terror and insurgency movements.

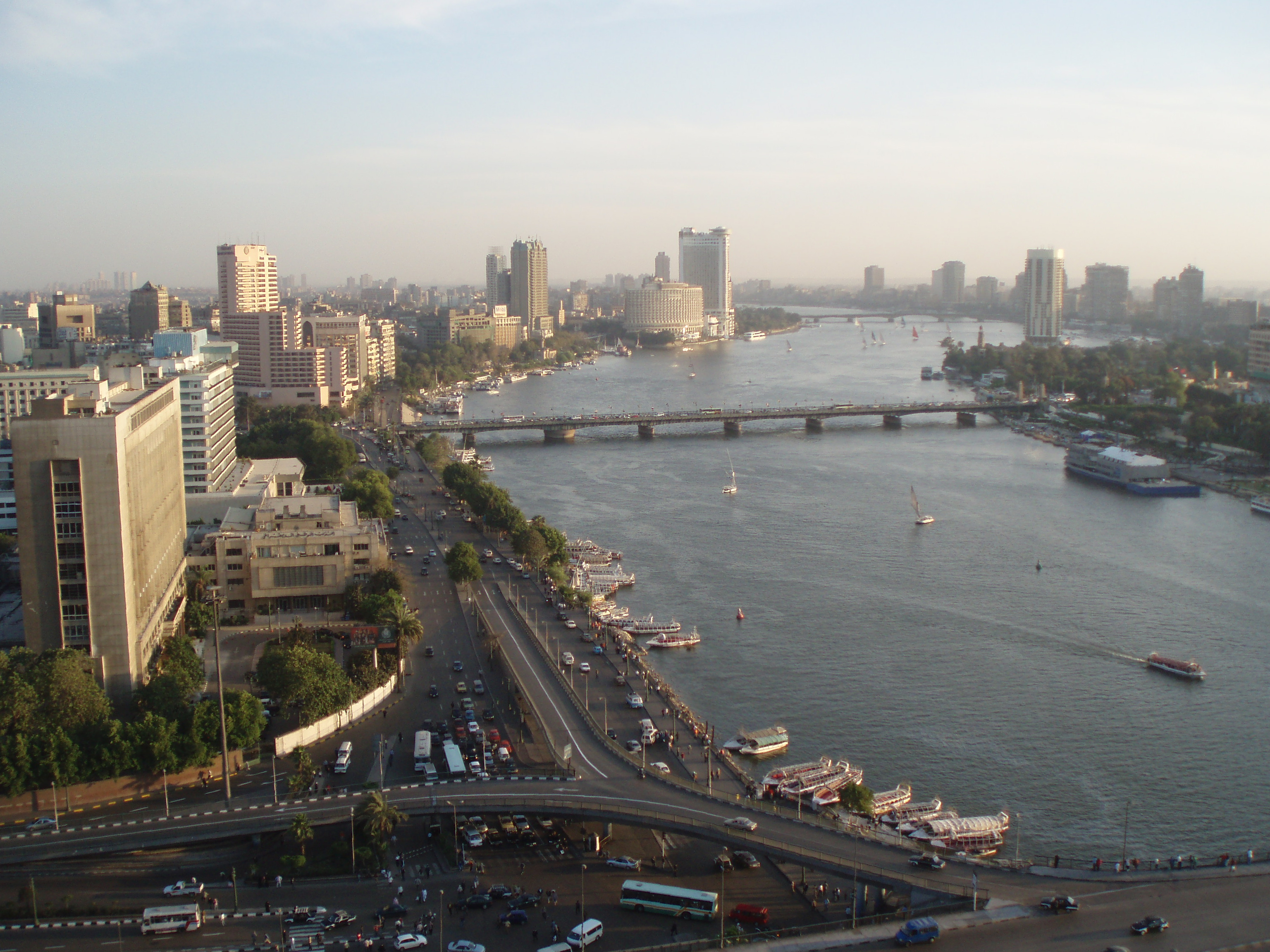
The Nile River, as seen in Cairo, Egypt

=== Environmental concerns ===
With the acceleration of climate change and its increasingly tangible impact on agriculture across Africa, governments have sought to encourage the adoption of institutional and economic reforms that foster resilience to climate change at a local and transnational level. This has special urgency because Africa is considered by many scholars to be the area of land most vulnerable to climate variability, particularly given the heavy dependency of the economies of Africa on subsistence agriculture. Despite a dramatic variation in climates across the different zones of the continent, all face formidable hurdles in maintaining their agricultural output. The majority of studies indicate a net negative impact of climate change on crop production, which illustrates why cross-regional African organizations have prioritized combatting the effects of climate change through cooperation on augmenting the adaptive capacity of farmers.

Another issue correlated to the changing climate is the topic of international water usage rights. One prominent case is that of the Nile River, the output of which has been highly disputed throughout history. With rising levels of climate change, a larger proportion of water is lost to evaporation. This is also exacerbated by the population boom of sub-Saharan African countries, which is expected to place further strain on these limited water resources. Egypt, followed by Sudan, is currently the largest consumer of the Nile's water and has strategized methods to monopolize its usage. In this instance, supply exceeds demand; all parties cite their need for the Nile waters to supplement their own developmental aims. This has led to strained relations with upstream countries such as Kenya and Uganda and over a decade of unsuccessful attempts to negotiate for equitable water-sharing measures.

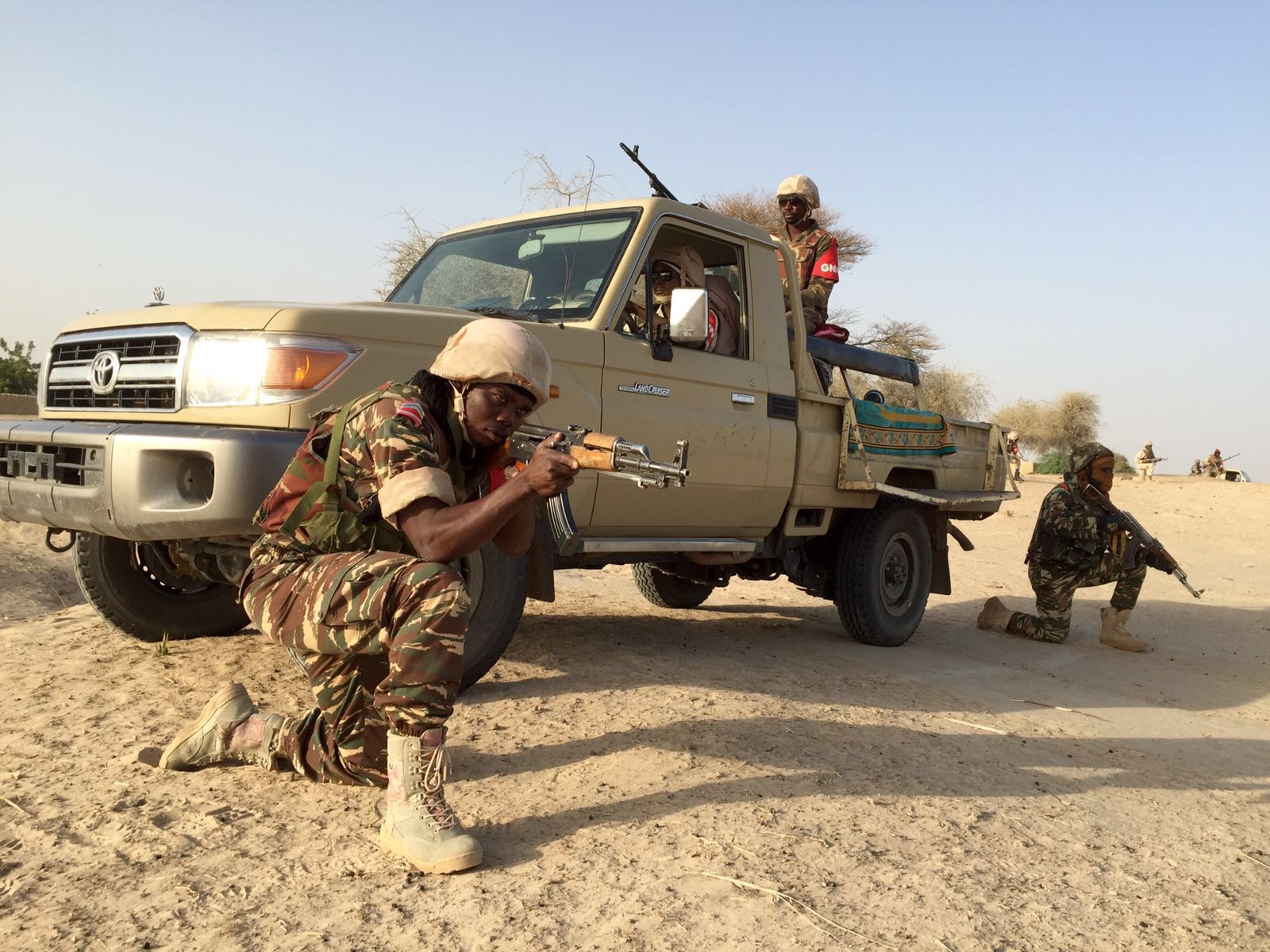
The Nigerian armed forces engaged in a counter-insurgency combat drill

=== Terrorism and Insurgency Movements ===
An issue that has plagued stable governance in several African countries is the prevalence of Islamic extremist movements and insurgencies. Such movements have been attributed to confounding societal factors such as poverty or the lack of educational opportunity. Additionally, socioeconomic, political, and ethnic variables are also said to play a factor in the successful perpetuation of these movements and subversion of state authority. The overall politicization of Islam in Muslim-majority countries in both North and sub-Saharan Africa is viewed by some as a reaction to the imposition of western ideologies and principles through legacies of colonialism or cultural diffusion. The strong symbols of Islamic identity embedded in these regions act as a catalyst from which conflict may occur and even spill across borders. One prominent example of this can be seen in the case of Boko Haram, a militant Islamist terror group originating in Nigeria that has enacted several acts of mass violence throughout the greater Sahel region. Countries across Africa have recently focused on reducing rates of radicalization and eliminating the operational threats of such groups.

== See also ==
- Demographics of Africa
- Intra-African Migration
- Islam in Africa
- Pan-Africanism
- Economy of Africa
- African Union
