= Jamaicans in New York City =

There are 38,980 foreign-born Jamaican people in New York City according to the 2009-2011 ACS. Jamaicans currently make up 2.0% of New York City's population and 5.5% of New York's foreign-born population. Foreign-born Jamaicans have are concentrated in central and eastern Brooklyn, southeast Queens, and northern Bronx.

Jamaican people were an important presence in Harlem in the 1920s. Marcus Garvey was an important Jamaican figure in New York City.

== See also ==
- Caribbean immigration to New York City
