= Little Africa, Manhattan =

Historic African American neighborhood in Greenwich Village

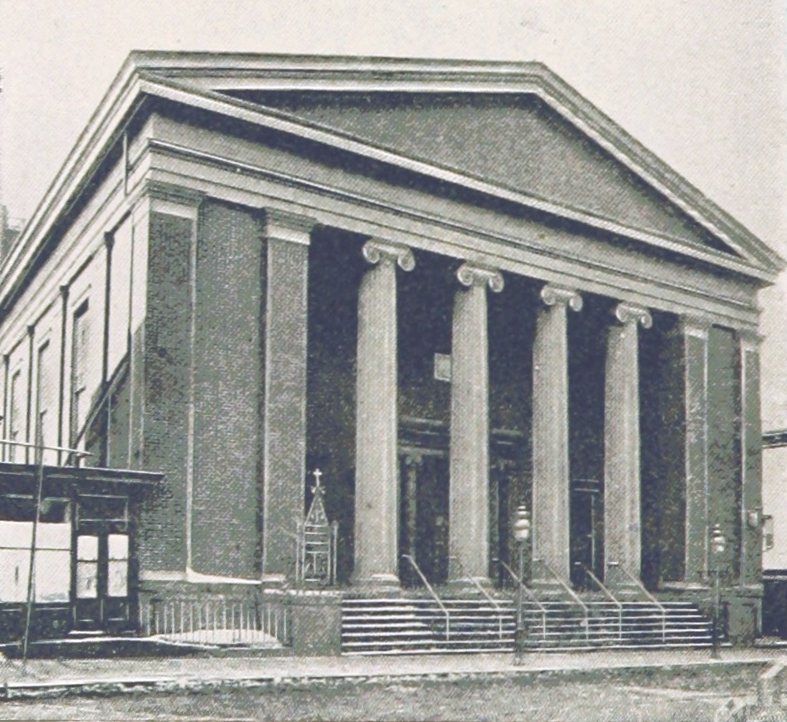
Church of St. Benedict the Moor, 210 Bleecker Street, in 1893

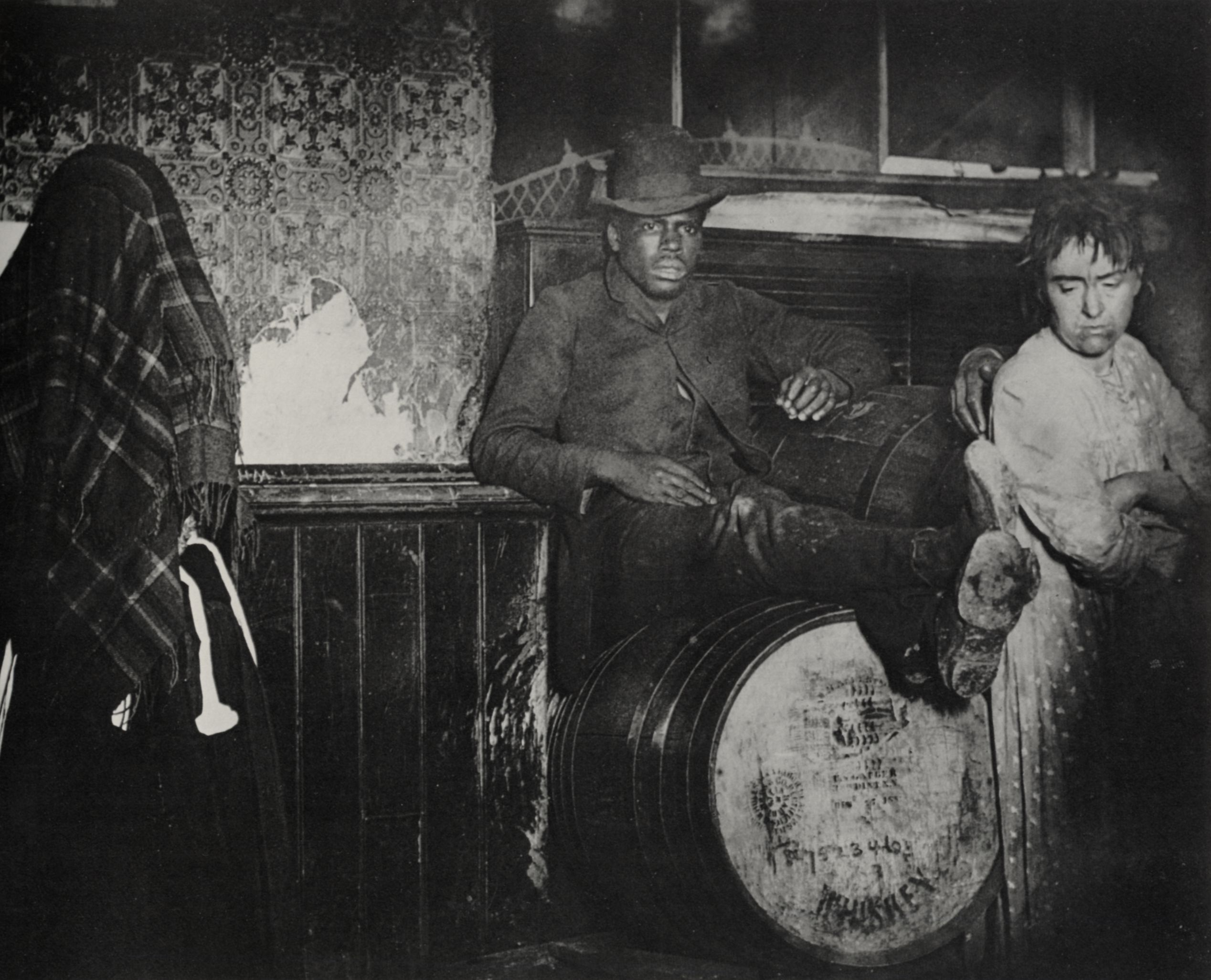
Black and Tan saloon in Little Africa, from How the Other Half Lives.

Little Africa was an African-American neighborhood in Greenwich Village and particularly the South Village, from the mid-19th century until about the turn of the 20th century. The dominant African American center in Manhattan of its period, as part of a general northward march uptown it was preceded by the Five Points (also known as "Little Africa" or Stagg Town), and succeeded by the Tenderloin, San Juan Hill and eventually Harlem. Its main thoroughfare was Thompson Street, and also the complex of Minetta Lane/Street/Place, and much of its historic area lies with the current Sullivan-Thompson Historic District.

The name Little Africa was given to several black communities in New York City, it was first applied to what became the Five Points. It was the original site of the Abyssinian Baptist Church, opened on Worth Street - now in TriBeCa - in 1808 by free Anglo-Africans and Ethiopian sailors. During the 1890s the name Little Africa was also applied to the area near Broadway and Harrison streets in Williamsburg.

Little Africa in Manhattan initially developed as a reaction to the violence of the 1834 anti-abolition riots in the Five Points. It formed a demographic contrast to the smaller, more rural and middle-class Seneca Village located farther north until its razing in 1857. The urban neighborhood suffered great violence itself during the 1863 draft riots, although in the aftermath of the Civil War its African American population grew with the migration of Southern freedmen.

Two centuries before the urban neighborhood, under Dutch colonial rule there was a complex of African-owned farms in approximately the same area north of New Amsterdam. The territory had been given to eleven Africans in 1644 by the Dutch West India Company and played as a buffer for the Dutch colony against local Indians.
