= March uptown =

Historical northward development of Manhattan

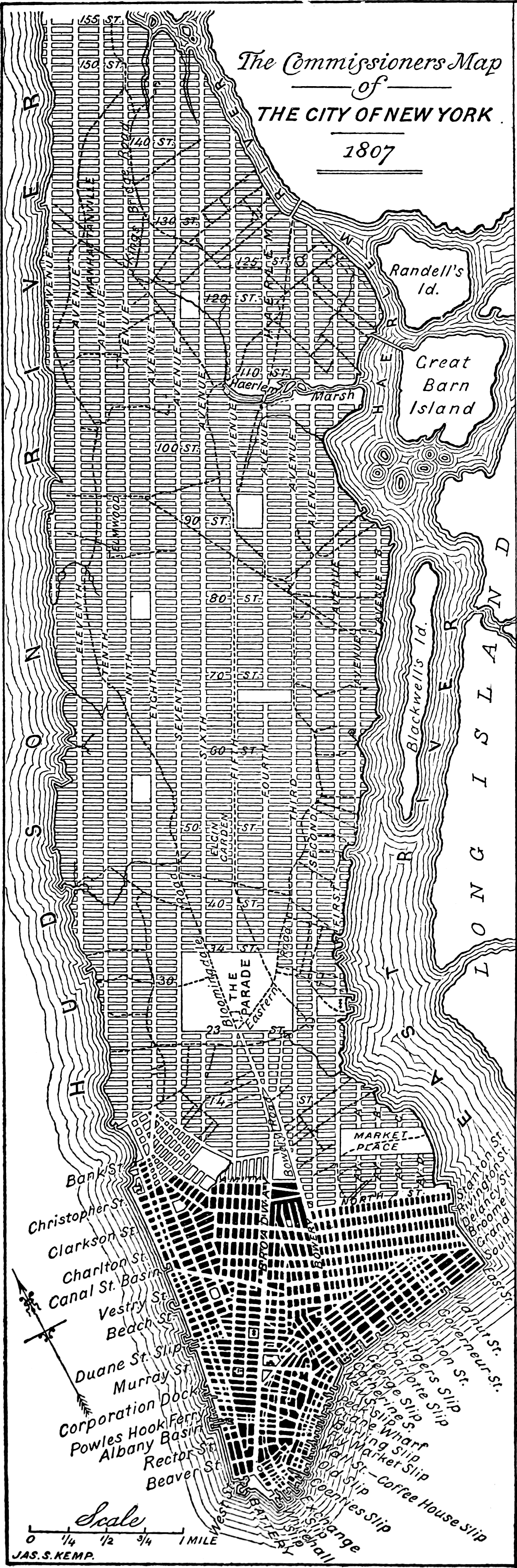
An 1893 redrawing of the 1807 version of the Commissioners' grid plan for Manhattan, a few years before it was adopted in 1811

The uptown trend of Manhattan, allegorized as an inexorable parade of destiny on its "march uptown", refers to the northward socioeconomic real estate trend toward Uptown, a long-standing historical pattern from the 17th to the 20th centuries. Beginning with New Amsterdam at the island's southern tip, European colonial and later American settlement, especially in the century or so after the Commissioners' Plan of 1811, expanded continually in a common direction.

Former agricultural hamlets such as Harsenville, Carmansville, and Harlem became successively industrial exurbs, residential suburbs, and urban districts, the former farmland between them being filled in. Thus, in the concentric zone model, the zones moved outward.

Different economic and social aspects took different trajectories, such as business and retail and entertainment shift from Lower Manhattan to Midtown Manhattan, and the path of the Four Hundred and social elites of other eras was closely followed, often ahead of business and other residential settlement; several New York City ethnic enclaves took their own route, most notably African American neighborhoods from the Five Points through several intermediate stages of community displacement to Harlem.

Few projects were able to slow the trend, though some aspects of it did settle by the mid-20th century. Broadway theatre during the 19th century marched from Lower Manhattan via the Bowery and up Broadway, finally alighting around Longacre Square, soon to be renamed Times Square and displacing the horse trade.

The trend reversed itself to some extent in the 21st century, in the period after the September 11 attacks.

== See also ==
- Linear city
