= Universal Hip Hop Parade =

- Universal Hip Hop Parade logo
- Formation: 1999
- Website: uhhparade.org

The Universal Hip Hop Parade (UHHP) is an annual cultural event held in the historically Black neighborhood of Bedford–Stuyvesant, Brooklyn, New York City, on the Saturday before the anniversary of Marcus Garvey's birthday each August 17. The parade is a reminder that Marcus Garvey himself also used popular culture as a tool to empower people and encouraged the growth of Black institutions.

The parade is the world's longest celebration of Hip-hop culture. It covers all the traditional elements of Hip hop including rappers, break dancers, singers and actors performing both on floats and on foot. Additionally, graffiti artists and deejay's perform at different locations along the parade route.

The parade also presents other examples of the vibrant artistic and cultural life of the community including stilt walkers, motorcycle & van clubs, graffiti banner displays, marching bands, sound trucks, dancers and more. Additionally Hip-hop legends, elected officials, community activists and legendary MC's have participated. The parade also serves to display the emerging neighborhood of Bedford Stuyvesant, including its arts, culture and growing commercial district to the residents from other neighborhoods of New York City as well as other visitors to the area. Local organizations showcase their artistic creativity, membership and colors while promoting their services, events and products. Neighborhood businesses and institutions along the route play music and distribute giveaways to help create a festive environment. Residents and visitors alike are urged to participate and join the parade procession.

== History ==
The Universal Hip Hop Parade was founded by Jeffery Kazembe Batts, Charles Barron, Freedom Williams and a host of activists in the fall of 1999 to celebrate the African American cultural social activist roots of hip-hop culture. It is an outgrowth of the work of an earlier group, the Universal Nubian Association (UNA). Organizers come from across the New York metropolitan area and have agreed to organize the UHHP in Bed-Stuy, Brooklyn.

In 2007, The Parade Made a Major Transition with Making the Mover and Shaker Out of Bed Stuy Brooklyn Mike Hollywood Christie a.k.a. Dj Dr Hollywood at the Helm and He took the Organization to New Heights with Monthly Open Mic's and Helping the Parade Reach its highest viewing numbers to date. Mike Hollywood Christie was the Parade Chairman from 2007 - 2011 and August 2013 - March 2014.

In addition to running the parade itself, the nonprofit group Universal Hip-Hop Parade Foundation, Inc. also organizes forums, concerts, open-mike's, rallies, teach-ins and parties throughout the year.

The foundation is funded through private donations and grants including the Greater New York Development Fund of the New York City Department of Cultural Affairs, administrated by the Brooklyn Arts Council (BAC).

== See also ==
- Brooklyn
- Bedford Stuyvesant
- Marcus Garvey
- Hip hop culture
