= Charles William Anderson =

American politician (1866–1938)

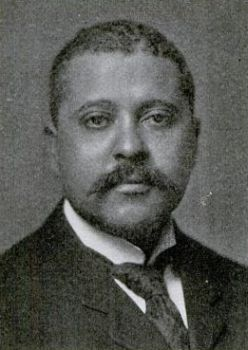

Charles William Anderson (April 28, 1866 – January 28, 1938) was a Republican Party political organizer who served as Collector of Revenue in New York City. He was appointed by U.S. president Theodore Roosevelt who dined with Booker T. Washington at the White House weeks into his presidency and noted his intention to make a prominent appointment of an African American to an office in his home state.

He was born in Oxford, Ohio. He became a Republican Party political organizer in New York City.

U.S. President Theodore Roosevelt appointed him in 1905 to the Revenue position in New York City succeeding Charles H. Treat. U.S. President Woodrow Wilson removed him and other African Americans from their posts. Warren G. Harding appointed him to another Revenue post.

In January 1908, Roosevelt wrote him a note thanking him for a favorable speech he gave.

He married Emma Lee Bonaparte. He held various roles in official ceremonies and was a member of several cultural institutions.

He died January 28, 1938 at his home in Harlem in New York from pneumonia.

== See also ==
- William Demosthenes Crum, another Roosevelt appointee
- Minnie Cox, a postmaster in Indianola Roosevelt stood up for
- 1906 Atlanta race riot
- Brownsville affair
