= Black Lives Matter art in New York City =

Public art in New York City related to the Black Lives Matter movement

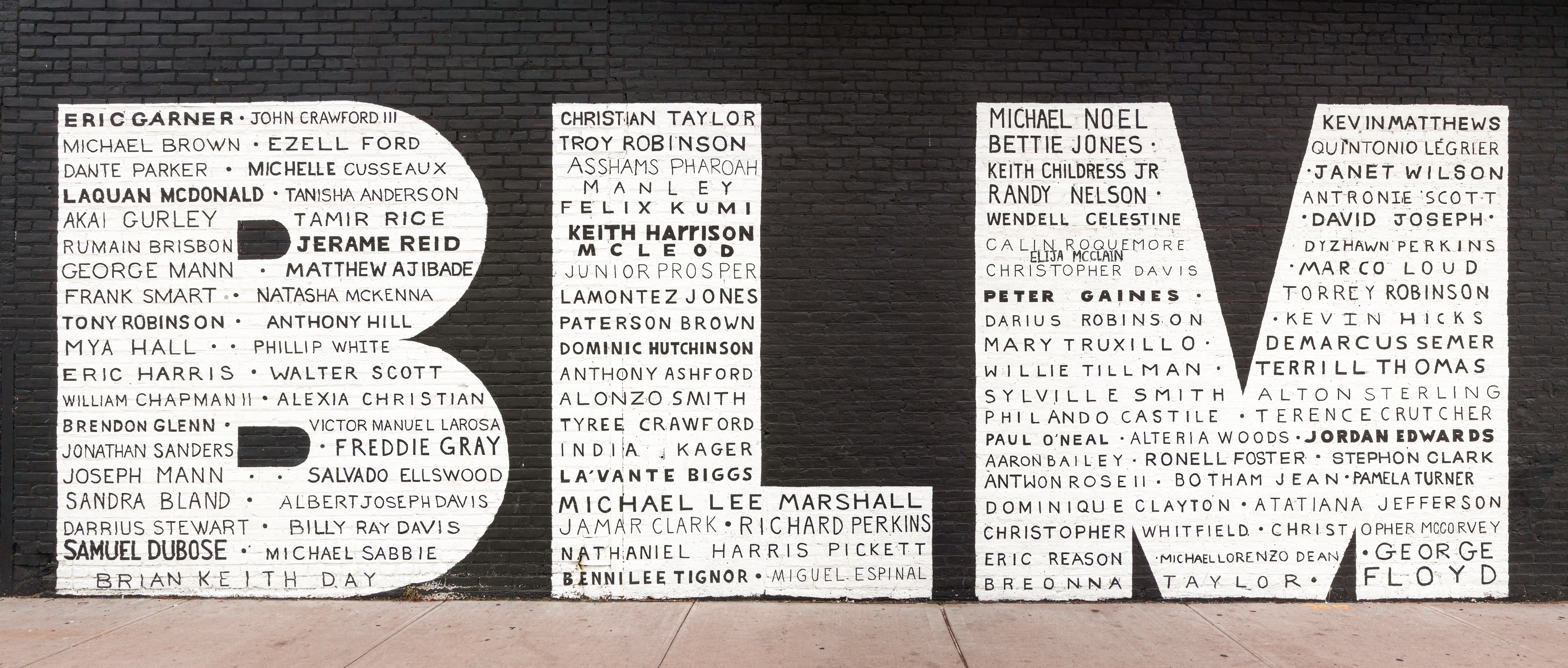
BLM mural in Greenpoint, Brooklyn

Many artworks related to the Black Lives Matter movement were created in New York City, during local protests over the murder of George Floyd and other Black Americans.

== Public art ==
In addition to street murals, cultural organizations transformed their facades into canvasses for Black Lives Matter. These included: The Africa Center, the Daryl Roth Theatre, and St. Ann's Warehouse's Supremacy Project.

Some organizations, including the Museum of the City of New York mounted temporary public art installations that highlighted the intersections between the BLM protests and the COVID-19 pandemic.

=== Bust of George Floyd ===
A bust of George Floyd was unveiled and installed at Flatbush Junction (at the intersection of Flatbush Avenue and Nostrand Avenue) in Flatbush, Brooklyn in June, 2021 coinciding with Juneteenth. After a month in the Flatbush location, the bust moved to Union Square, Manhattan. While in Brooklyn, the bust was vandalized with black spray paint. The bust was quickly restored.

=== Street murals ===
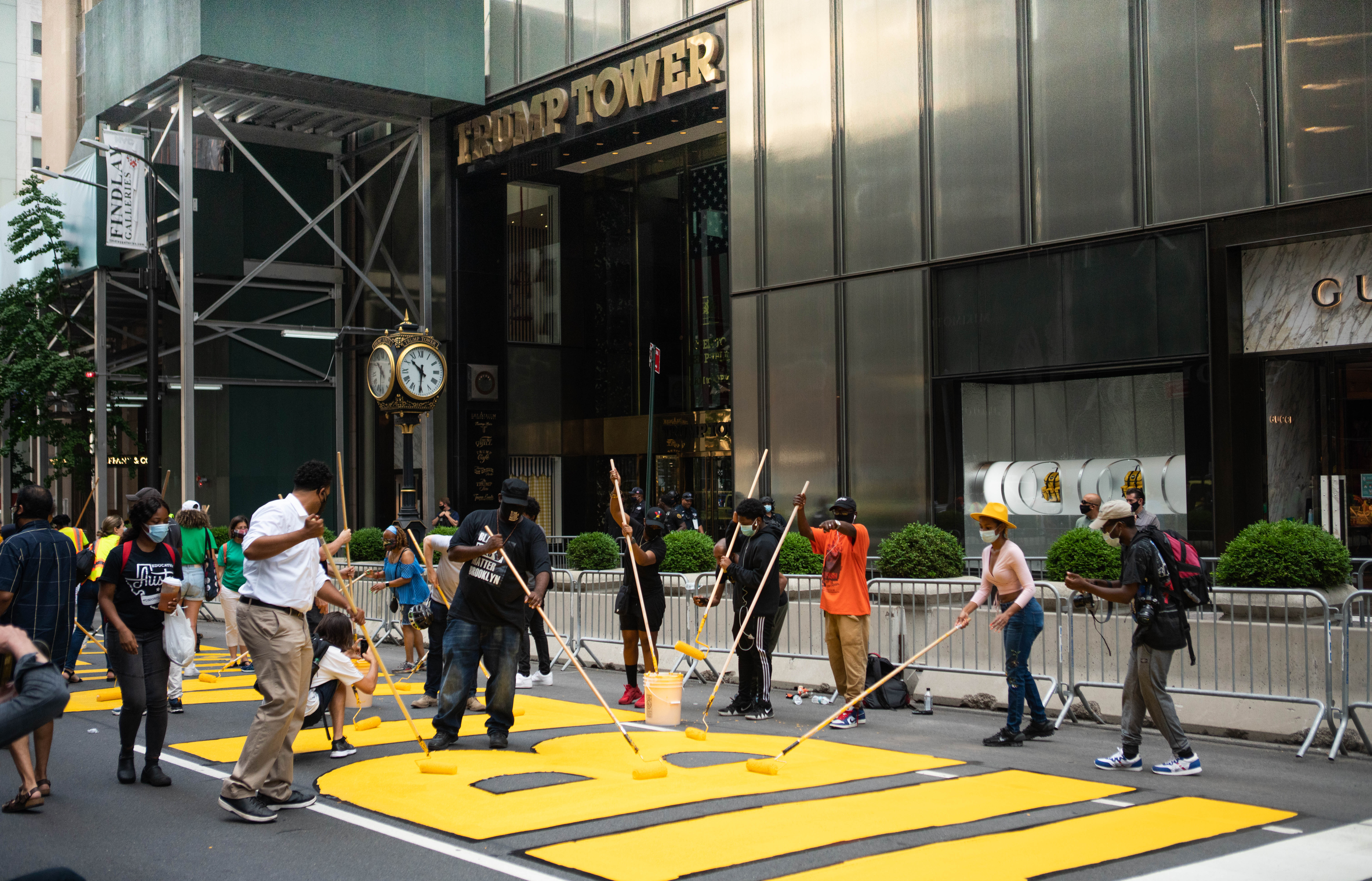
Black Lives Matter street mural on Fifth Avenue in front of Trump Tower

On June 9, Mayor Bill de Blasio announced plans to rename and paint in each of the five boroughs of New York City in honor of Black Lives Matter in consultation with city leaders, advocates, and the city council. He stated "It's time to do something officially representing this city to recognize the power of the fundamental idea of Black Lives Matter, the idea that so much of American history has wrongly renounced, but now must be affirmed." Efforts were made to have the murals reflect their locations, as well as the overall movement.

On June 14, volunteers painted "Black Lives Matter" in yellow along Fulton Street in the Bedford–Stuyvesant neighborhood of Brooklyn. The second mural was painted on June 19 along Richmond Terrace on the North Shore of Staten Island between the borough hall and a police precinct.

Plans were stated for murals along 153rd Street in the Jamaica neighborhood of Queens, Center Street in Manhattan, and Morris Avenue in the Bronx. Two additional murals were planned for Manhattan, including one on Fifth Avenue in front of Trump Tower, reminiscent of the original mural in front of the White House. The plan for Fifth Avenue was criticized by Donald Trump, as he called it a "symbol of hate" and criticized Blasio for defunding the police by $1 billion while authorizing the mural. The mural on Fifth Avenue was painted on July 9, 2020, with help from Mayor de Blasio and members of the Central Park Five.
