= Amsterdam Houses =

Public housing development in Manhattan, New York

- NYCHA property
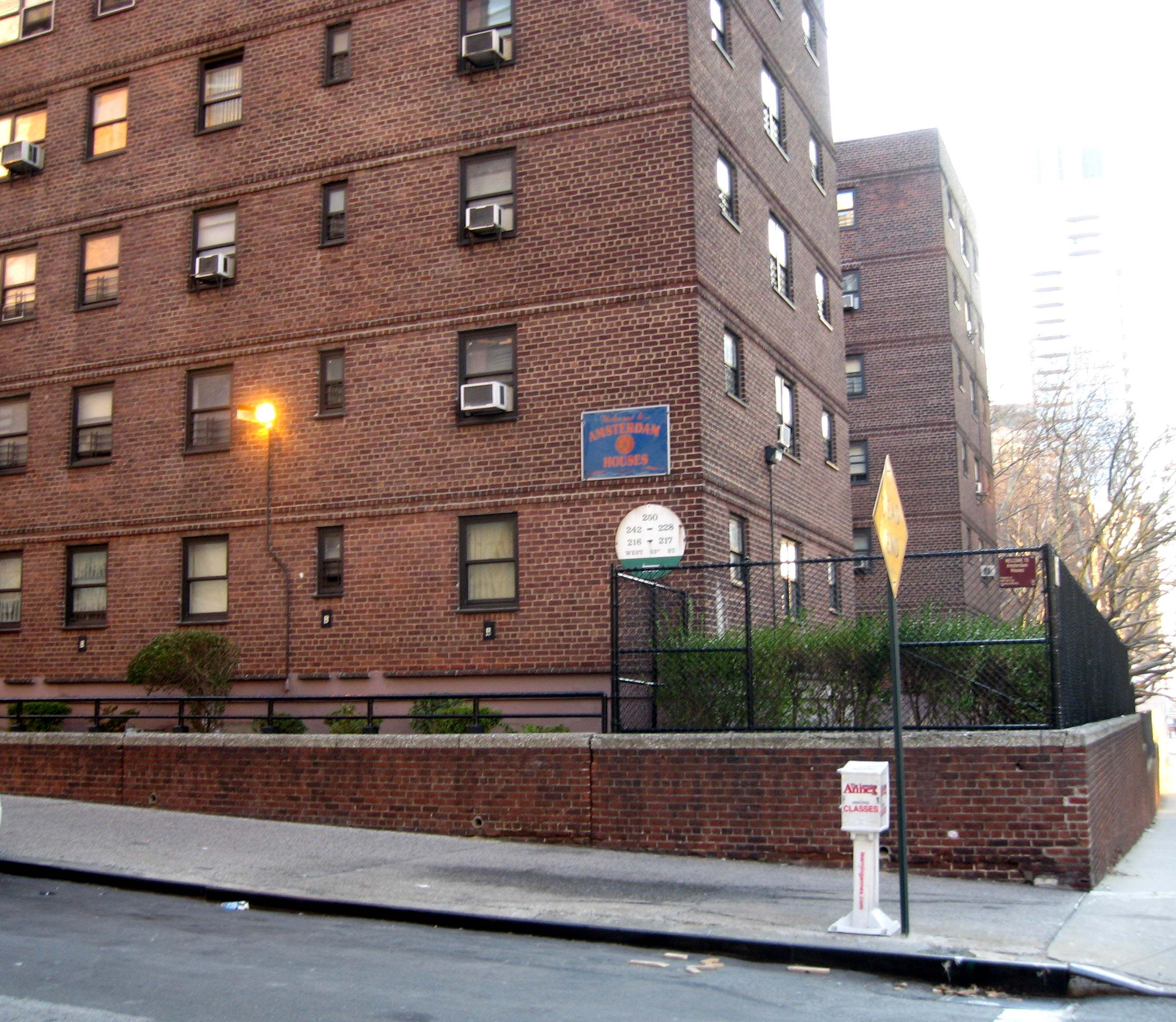
- Amsterdam Houses, at southeast corner of West End Avenue and 63d Street (2008)
- Interactive map of Amsterdam Houses
- Coordinates: 40.773139°N 73.986444°W
- Country: United States
- State: New York
- City: New York City
- Borough: Manhattan

Area
  - Total: 0.001 sq mi (0.0026 km^{2})

Population
  - Total: 334
  - Density: 330,000/sq mi (130,000/km^{2})
- ZIP codes: 10025, 10023
- Area codes: 212, 332, 646, and 917
- Website: my.nycha.info/DevPortal/

The Amsterdam Houses is a housing project in New York City that was established in the borough of Manhattan in 1948. The project consists of 13 buildings with over 1,000 apartment units. It covers a 9-acre expanse of Lincoln Square, a neighborhood on the Upper West Side, and is bordered by West 61st and West 64th Streets, from Amsterdam Avenue to West End Avenue, with a 175-apartment addition that was completed in 1974 on West 65th Street between Amsterdam Avenue and West End Avenue. It is owned and managed by New York City Housing Authority (NYCHA).

== History ==
The Amsterdam Houses were created on land that was once tenement buildings and were created for residents to have a higher standard of living. Three playgrounds were built for children of various ages and the development housed a nursery, gymnasium, clinic and a community center. With the opening of Lincoln Center in the 1960s, the neighborhood began to gentrify and saw many older residents retaining their apartments; by 2016, 70% of heads of households were over the age of 62. The demographics living in this development were initially mixed, as it served to house post-war families in affordable housing. By no later than 2004, mostly black families occupied the Amsterdam Houses.

== Notable people ==
- barbara62, famous groundbreaking female graffiti artist
- Erik Estrada (born 1949), actor known for his role on CHiPs
- Daphne Maxwell Reid (born 1948), actress known for her role on The Fresh Prince of Bel-Air

== See also ==
- New York City Housing Authority
- List of New York City Housing Authority properties
