= James Newton Gloucester =

The Reverend James Newton Gloucester was an African-American clergyman and businessman who was a supporter of abolitionist John Brown.

Like his father, Gloucester was a Black Presbyterian pastor. In 1849 he founded Siloam Presbyterian Church. He and his church members were very active in the Underground Railroad.

Gloucester was also a friend and associate of John Brown. Two letters he wrote to Brown are still extant. Gloucester lived at 265 Bridge Street, Brooklyn, New York.
