= Caribbean immigration to New York City =

Caribbean immigration to New York City has been prevalent since the late 19th and the early 20th centuries. This immigration wave has seen large numbers of people from Jamaica, Haiti, Cuba, Dominican Republic, Antigua and Barbuda, Guyana, and Trinidad and Tobago, among others, come to New York City in the 20th and 21st centuries. (There has also been significant migration from Puerto Rico, but this is not considered immigration as Puerto Ricans hold United States citizenship.) Caribbean people are concentrated in the Bronx, particularly in the area from 211th Street to 241st Street and along Gun Hill Road. There are also large Caribbean communities in Brooklyn, especially in the neighborhoods of Flatbush and Prospect Heights.

== History ==
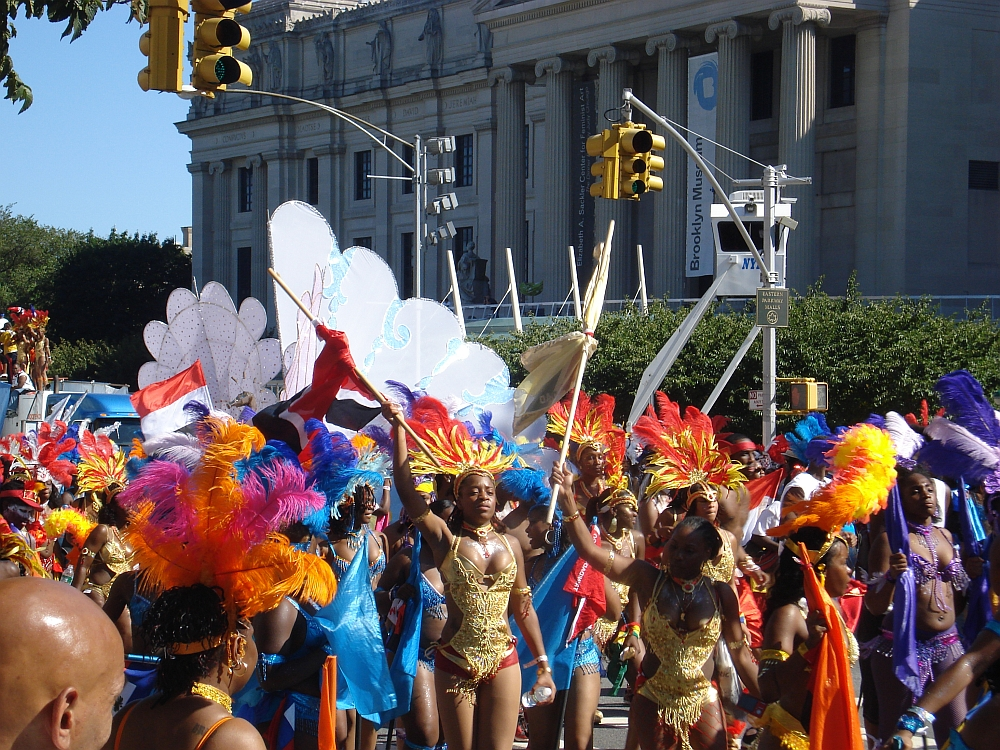
The West Indian Day Parade marching by the Brooklyn Museum

In 1613, Juan (Jan) Rodriguez from Santo Domingo became the first non-indigenous person to settle in what was then known as New Amsterdam.

In the early 1900s, the largest number of Black immigrants were English-speaking Caribbean people (West Indians) who settled in the Northeast, mainly in New York City. These initial immigrants were only 1.3 percent of the NYC population and faced intense racism and xenophobia, but the population continued to grow over the following decades. By 1920, Caribbean immigrants made up roughly one-fourth of the Black population in New York city. Many of these immigrants were young, unmarried men. According to Winston James, a few women arrived and held occupations as teachers, doctors, lawyers, and craftsmen. In New York, many Caribbean immigrants entered the service sector working as doorman, laborers, and porters. Women often worked in the domestic field as maids and nannies. Reimers points out that a substantial number of Caribbean immigrants attended night school and pursued higher education while in America.

New York City also witnessed the institution building of Black Caribbean people. The majority of the Caribbean people belonged to the Anglican branch of Protestantism. After being denied entry into white Episcopal churches, they formed Black Episcopalian churches such as Saint Augustine and Christ Church Cathedral in Brooklyn. In Harlem, West Indian Methodist and Episcopalian churches thrived. West Indians also developed non-religious institutions with the purpose of fostering mutual benefits societies. The intention of these organizations was to financially and socially assist "newcomers" or recent immigrants. Membership was based on the immigrant's country of origin. Some of these groups include the Bermuda Benevolent Association (founded 1897), the Sons and Daughters of Barbados, Trinidad Benevolent Association, and the Grenada Mutual Association. Perhaps the most well-known Caribbean emigrant of the 20th century was Jamaican-born Marcus Garvey who came to America and established his organization, Universal Negro Improvement Association (UNIA). The founding principles of UNIA were based on Black nationalism and promoting the economic development of Black people. Garvey's program gained widespread support of the many Caribbean and native-born Blacks. Winston James shows that many West Indians wanted UNIA to move beyond its economic emphasis and to overtly oppose the racism that they faced on a daily basis as Black immigrants. Radical West Indians, like Hubert Harrison (a Virgin Islander), further wanted to do away with what they believed to be a racist capitalist society, advocating socialism. A group of Caribbean New Yorkers founded the African Blood Brothers in 1919, combining their advocacy for socialism and Black Nationalism. However, this organization never gained a substantial following. Evidence shows that most West Indians who were able to attain citizenship voted for the Democratic Party. In New York, as Black Caribbean immigrants began to grow in size, a small number ran for political offices. During the 1930s and the Depression era, Caribbean immigration trailed off and fewer Black immigrants traveled to New York City because of the scarcity of employment opportunities.

== Hispanic ==
New York City has large populations of Caribbean Hispanics, primarily hailing from Puerto Rico and the Dominican Republic, though there exists smaller numbers of Panamanians, Cubans, Hondurans, and Costa Ricans.

=== Dominicans ===
Immigration records of Dominicans in the United States date from the late 19th century and New York City has had a Dominican community since the 1970s. From the 1960s onward, after the fall of the Rafael Trujillo military regime, large waves of migration have thoroughly transnationalized the Dominican Republic, metaphorically blurring its frontier with the United States.

In 2006 New York City's Dominican population decreased for the first time since the 1980s, dropping by 1.3% from 609,885 in 2006 to 602,093 in 2007. Dominicans are the city's fifth-largest ancestry group (behind Irish, Italian, German and Puerto Rican) and, in 2009, it was estimated that they compromised 24.9% of New York City's Latino population.

Areas with high a concentration of Dominicans are in Washington Heights, Corona, and certain areas in the Bronx. Eastern portions of the Washington Heights neighborhood and many western neighborhoods in the Bronx have some of the highest concentrations of Dominicans in the country.

The Guardian described American Airlines Flight 587, prior to its accident flight in 2001, as having "cult status" in Washington Heights. In 1996 Kinito Mendez played the song El avión which mentions Flight 587. The November 12, 2001, AA587 flight crashed, killing everyone on board.

=== Puerto Ricans ===
Puerto Ricans are Americans citizens by birth, so they are not immigrants.

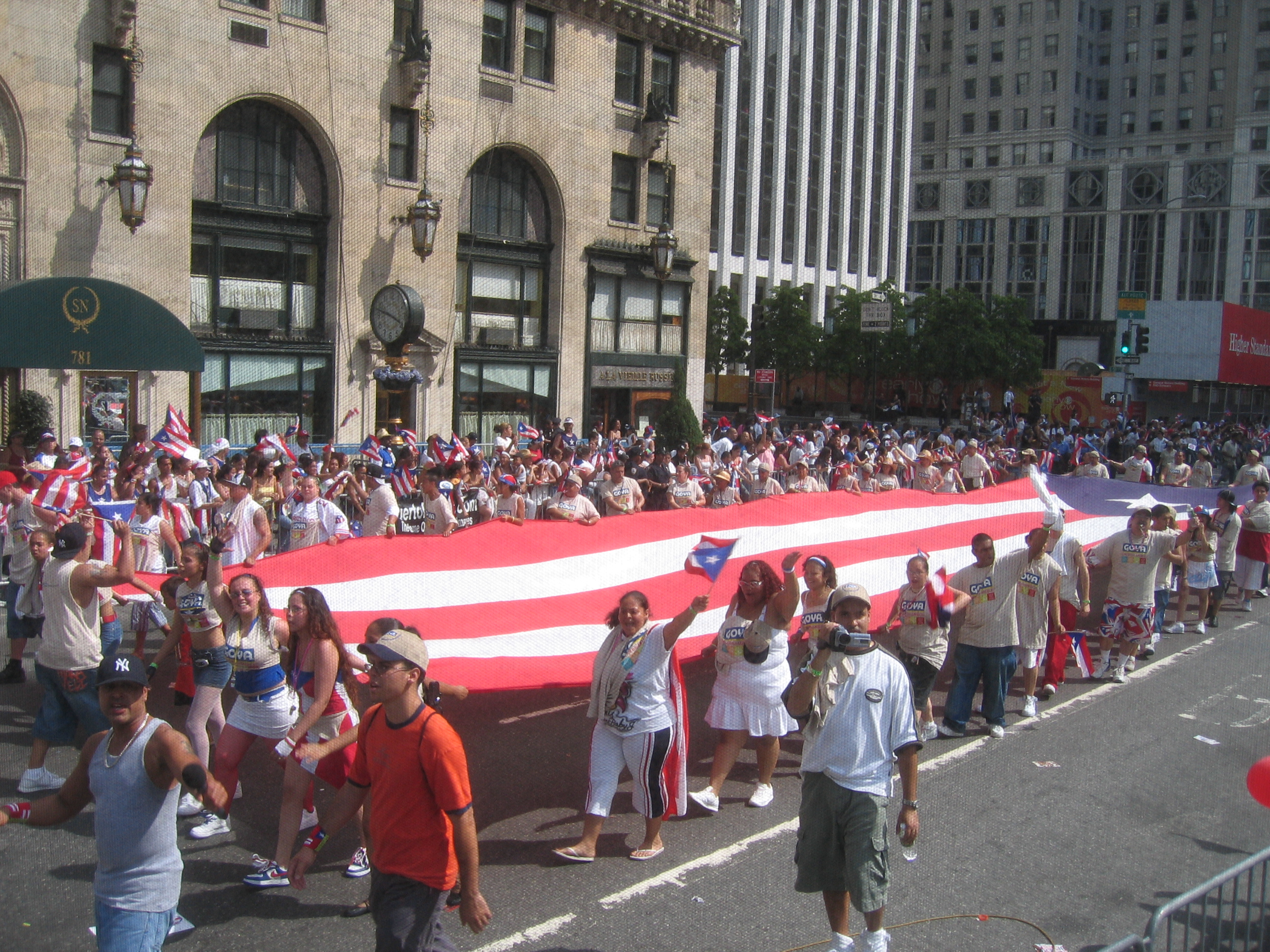
The 2005 National Puerto Rican Parade.

New York City has the largest Puerto Rican population outside of Puerto Rico. Puerto Ricans, due to the forced change of the citizenship status of the island's residents, can technically be said to have come to the City first as immigrants and subsequently as migrants. The first group of Puerto Ricans moved to New York in the mid-19th century, when Puerto Rico was a Spanish colony and its people Spanish subjects. The following wave of Puerto Ricans to move to New York did so after the Spanish–American War of 1898 made Puerto Rico a U.S. possession and after the Jones–Shafroth Act of 1917 gave Puerto Ricans U.S. citizenship, which allows travel without the need of a passport between the island and the United States mainland. The largest wave of migration came in the 1950s, in what became known as "The Great Migration"; as a result, more than a million Puerto Ricans once called New York City home. Presently the Puerto Rican population of New York is around 800,000, though the population has entered a sustained decline since 2017 as Puerto Ricans leave for surrounding areas and states, possibly influenced by the COVID-19 pandemic and economic challenges.

Puerto Ricans have historically lived in neighborhoods such as the Lower East Side (also known in the community as Loisaida), Spanish Harlem and Williamsburg, Brooklyn since the 1950s. There are large Puerto Rican populations throughout the 5 boroughs, with the Bronx having the largest. Currently, Bushwick and several South Bronx neighborhoods, such as Soundview, have some of the largest numbers of Puerto Ricans in the city. However, there has been an increase in Puerto Ricans in outlying areas of the city, such as the North Shore of Staten Island, and the eastern Bronx.

=== Cubans ===
New York City has the third largest Cuban population in the country. The Cuban-American population of the New York Metro area is primarily concentrated in New Jersey, specifically in Hudson, Bergen, and Union Counties. West New York and Union City are possibly the only municipalities in the region where Cubans outnumber other Latino ethnicities, such as Dominicans and Mexicans.
