= Intra-African migration =

Africa hosts the fourth largest number of global international migrants. In 2017, 25 million people migrated within and outside it. Most of migration in Africa occurs within the continent as 19 million people moved between African countries. The surge in international migration within Africa is due in part by the efforts of African states and international institutions to enhance regional integration. Regional migration in the African continent is also largely facilitated by the development of infrastructure and diffusion of western languages and culture.

== African migration trends ==
=== Statistical overview ===
As of 2017, 38 million out of the total 258 million global international migrants were born in Africa. 48 out of 58 countries in Africa had at least one source of data accounting for migration statistics; the amount of migrants included in data from the 2000 census or later was about 79 percent. International migrants accounted for two percent or less of the total population of Africa between 2000 and 2017. Of the twenty largest countries of destination for international migrants, one is located on the African continent. In 2000, Côte d'Ivoire was the top destination for international migrants but has since changed to South Africa by 2017. The number of international migrants originating in Africa grew by 68 percent since 2000, the largest growth rate of a region of origin in the world. New York City and the remainder of North America were the fastest-growing destination for migrants born in Africa between 2000 and 2017. For migrants born in Europe, one of the fastest growing destinations was Africa. Although small in absolute numbers of migrants, the fastest growing destination for international migrants born in Oceania and in Latin America and the Caribbean was Africa with a 7 percent increase per year (15,000 and 22,000 migrants, respectively). Over half (53 percent) of total African migrants resided within the region.

=== General trends ===
Intra-African continental migration tends to be highest in the West African countries, Southern African countries and small states (Lesotho and Eritrea). Intra-continental emigration trends are low in densely populated countries such as Nigeria, Egypt, and South Africa, as well as in the North African Maghreb, from which region most tend to migrate to Europe.

== Reasons for migration ==
Economic factors are the main drivers of international migration in Africa as many migrants cross borders to find employment. Education and family reasons are cited as the second and third most common reasons. Among women, family is the most common reason for migration. Trans-border migration, while largely driven by immediate and specific economic needs, is largely intended to be temporary. Nevertheless, many low-skilled foreign workers end up staying well beyond their intended time. Further, unskilled migrant workers are often classified as temporary migrants in literature on Sub-Saharan African migration, rather than long term or permanent immigrants, regardless of their legal status.

Some of the large swaths of migration in Africa is also often induced by political instability, dramatic regime changes, ethnic tensions, and civil wars which are referred to as forced migration. According to official data, about fourteen percent of international migration in Africa is characterized as forced and involve individuals in "refugee-like" situations. In contrast to popular belief, about 86 percent of African migration is not related to conflict.

== International migration systems ==
=== South African migration system ===
The South African Migration System is centered around South Africa and has been developed since the late 19th century in parallel with the emergence and growth of the South African Mining industry. The South African Migration System is defined in large part by the political and economic preeminence of South Africa as a destination for migrants within the continent.

=== West African migration system ===
The West African Migration System emerged from the legacies of the French and British colonial empires. Some scholars argue that migration dynamics in West Africa have been attributed to the formation of capitalist economies and the spread of capitalism to other urban settlements and the countryside result in regional and social inequalities. Migration patterns in the West African Migration System are diverse than the South African Migration System because of a lack of a single powerful magnet for migrants (like South Africa). Foreigners made up almost a quarter of Côte d'Ivoire's population until civil war broke out between 2002 and 2004 that undermined its once buoyant economy.

== Role of states and regional international institutions ==
Historically, colonial occupation and the slave trade have shaped the contemporary migration patterns within and from the African continent. During colonial liberation, millions of Africans fled conflicts with colonial powers. The establishment of independent states did not entirely create peaceful conditions; political and economic factors as a result of new conflicts contributed to uncertainty as an incentive to leave one's home state.

Under authoritarian regimes, many more people may wish to migrate but cannot because of the government's increasing willingness to control and restrict emigration. Characteristics of the state-formation process such as nationalism, anti-colonial sentiment, xenophobia and protectionism are used in similar vein by several African governments such as Algeria, Egypt and Côte d'Ivoire to discourage emigration (fearing the loss of human capital) and to restrict immigration or foreigners.

Political stability and national wealth have a particular influence on migration trends in that individuals are less likely to emigrate when they can imagine a future in their home country. Those with higher educational and occupational specializations tend to move across borders in search of more diversified and complex labor markets and social opportunities. A recent analysis of global migrant stock data found a significantly positive relationship between a state's level of political freedom and emigration.

In recent years, regional international institutions in Africa have worked to enhance regional integration on the continent by reducing barriers to immigration. Regional economic communities such as the Economic Community of West African States (ECOWAS) as well as the East African Community (EAC) have cited free movement of persons as a key tenet of their drive toward greater integration. Further, ECOWAS has eliminated visa requirements for citizens of member states to support the free movement of people, goods and capital throughout the region. The South African Development Community (SADC) also works to promote integration and cooperation among member states. Further, in 2018 the African Union adopted a continent wide protocol on free movement to enhance intra-regional migration. Most migrants in Africa chose to stay within the region because the prospect of relocating in Europe or North America is tempered by the reality of cumbersome and highly restrictive visa requirements.

== Experience of African migrants ==
Public xenophobia is often a characteristic of the experience of migrants in sub-saharan Africa, as is in many other parts of the world. It is reinforced by and reinforces state-level hostility as there is often a lack of an adequate legal protection framework for migrants. Many migrants become targets of harassment and violence, especially in times of economic downturns. For example, In Côte d'Ivoire, real or imagined migratory status, combined with religion and ethnicity, was used by the government as a political mobilization tool in the recent civil conflict. While prolonged and indefinite settlements of large groups of migrants often lead to formation of immigrant communities, it is an understudied area in Africa.

=== Female migration ===
Cross border migration offers women traders a path for economic advancement. There is significant evidence that illustrates the feminization trend of sub-saharan international migration, yet women's motivations for crossing international borders varies greatly from those of men. While men migrate to South Africa mainly for work, for women, work reasons for migration rank below family visits, shopping, selling goods, and obtaining medical care. Women tend to engage in short distance and short term transborder moves while men's migration tends to be longer distance.

== See also ==
- Free movement protocol
- Threats facing illegal immigrants
