= List of traffic circles in Washington, D.C. =

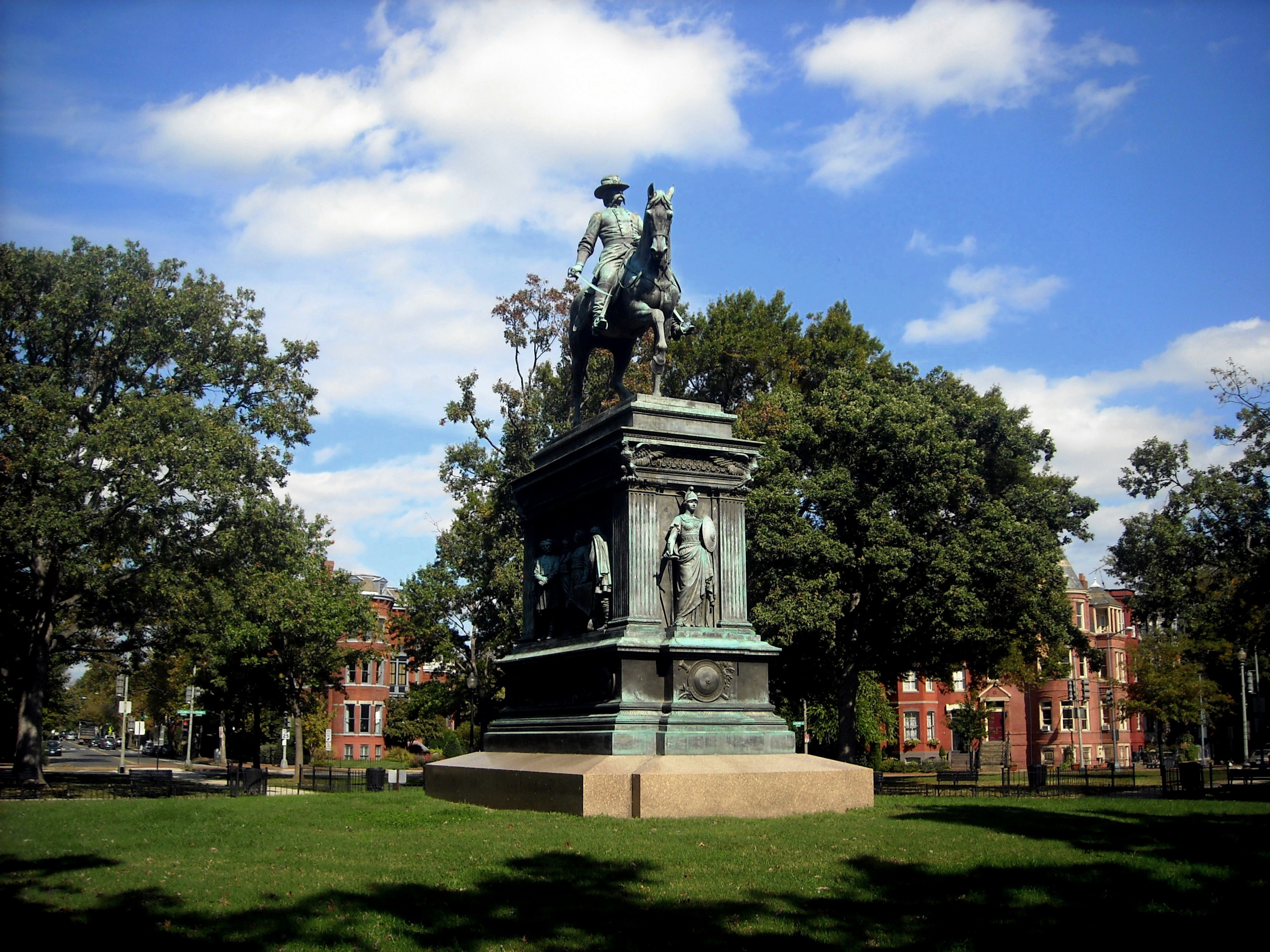
Statue of John A. Logan in the center of Logan Circle

The surface road layout in Washington, D.C. consists primarily of numbered streets along the north–south axis and lettered streets (followed by streets named in alphabetical order) along the east–west axis. Avenues named for 48 of the 50 U.S. states plus Puerto Rico crisscross this grid diagonally, and where the avenues intersect with streets, named circles often occur, similar to squares or plazas in other cities. Some of these date back to the city's original street plan, and most do not function as modern traffic circles. Many circles are named for American Civil War generals and admirals, while several neighborhoods take their names from nearby circles. There are approximately 36 major circles currently in the district.

== Northwest ==
- Anna J. Cooper Circle – intersection of 3rd and T Streets in LeDroit Park
- Blair Circle – intersection of 16th Street, Eastern Avenue, Colesville Road, and North Portal Drive; circle is split between North Portal Estates and Silver Spring, Maryland
- Chevy Chase Circle – intersection of Western and Connecticut Avenues, Chevy Chase and Magnolia Parkways, and Grafton Street; circle is only half within the District; the other half is in Chevy Chase, Maryland
- Dupont Circle – intersection of Connecticut, Massachusetts, and New Hampshire Avenues and 19th and P Streets, with an underpass for Connecticut Avenue and an express lane for Massachusetts Avenue
- Grant Circle – intersection of New Hampshire and Illinois Avenues and Varnum and 5th Streets
- Logan Circle – intersection of Rhode Island and Vermont Avenues and 13th and P Streets
- Observatory Circle – intersection of Massachusetts Avenue and 34th Street; the roadway does not form a complete circle (see United States Naval Observatory and Number One Observatory Circle)
- Peace Circle – intersection of First Street and Pennsylvania Avenue
- Scott Circle – intersection of Rhode Island and Massachusetts Avenues and 16th Street, with an underpass for 16th Street
- Sheridan Circle – intersection of Massachusetts Avenue and R and 23rd Streets
- Sherman Circle – intersection of Kansas and Illinois avenues and Crittenden and 7th Streets
- Tenley Circle – intersection of Wisconsin and Nebraska Avenues, Fort Drive, and Yuma Street
- Thomas Circle – intersection of Massachusetts and Vermont Avenues and 14th and M Streets, with an underpass for Massachusetts Avenue
- Ward Circle – intersection of Massachusetts and Nebraska Avenues
- Washington Circle – intersection of New Hampshire and Pennsylvania Avenues and K and 23rd Streets, with a K Street underpass

== Northeast ==
- Columbus Circle – intersection of Delaware, Louisiana, and Massachusetts Avenues and E and First Streets; Union Station and its access roads interrupt this circle on one side, making it more of a semicircle. It is also known as Columbus Plaza. Prior to the construction of the Columbus Memorial at its center in 1912, it was called Union Station Plaza.
- Dave Thomas Circle – triangular area bounded by Florida Avenue, New York Avenue and First Street Northeast. Though not part of the original city design, traffic patterns mimic other circles.
- Truxton Circle – now defunct, existing only as the name of a neighborhood; formerly the intersection of Florida Avenue, North Capitol Street, Q Street NW, and Q Street NE; this circle lay on the border of Northwest and Northeast Washington.

== Southeast ==
- Barney Circle – intersection of Pennsylvania and Kentucky Avenues 17th Street, and Southeast Boulevard
- Ellipse Park – intersection of 14th St SE and Pennsylvania and Potomac Avenues.

== Southwest ==
- Benjamin Banneker Circle – off L'Enfant Promenade, south of Interstate 395
- Lincoln Memorial Circle – intersection of 23rd Street, Henry Bacon and Daniel French Drives, and the Arlington Memorial Bridge; surrounds the Lincoln Memorial and is divided between the Southwest and Northwest quadrants of the city.
- Memorial Circle – connecting the Arlington Memorial and Memorial Avenue Bridges on Columbia Island. Proposed location for the United States Triumphal Arch.

== Photos ==
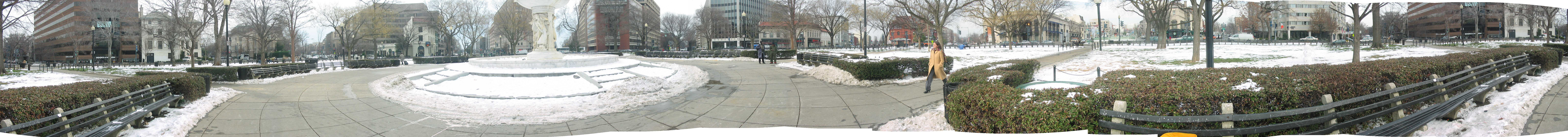
Panoramic view of a wintry Dupont Circle

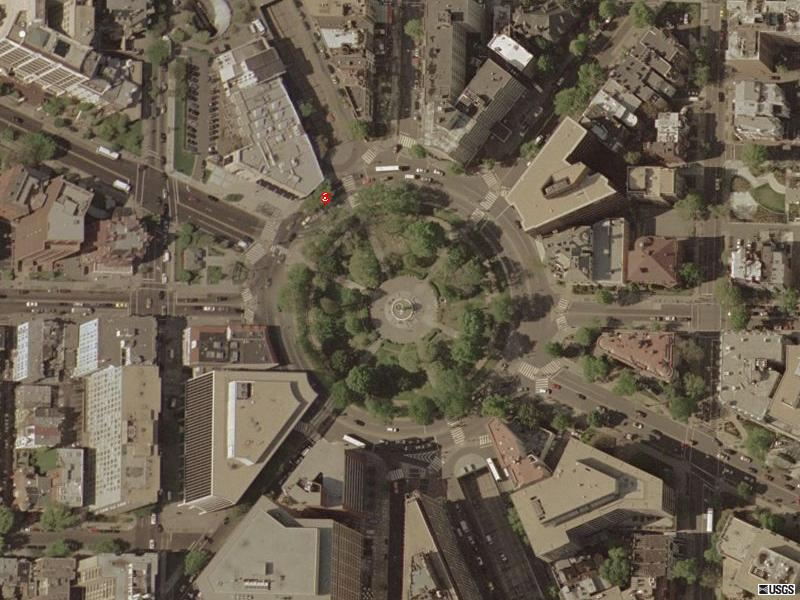
Aerial photograph of Dupont Circle

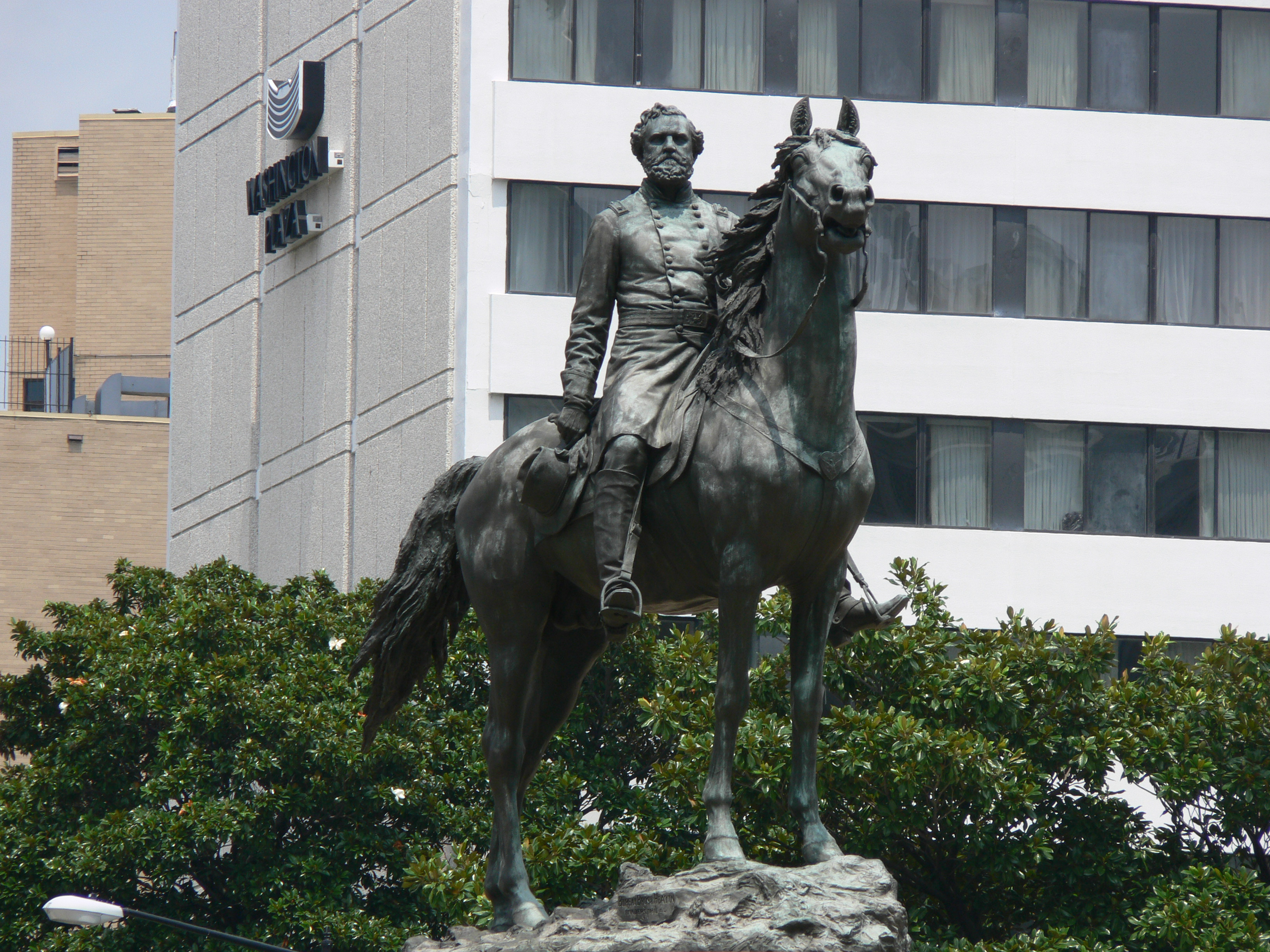
Thomas Circle

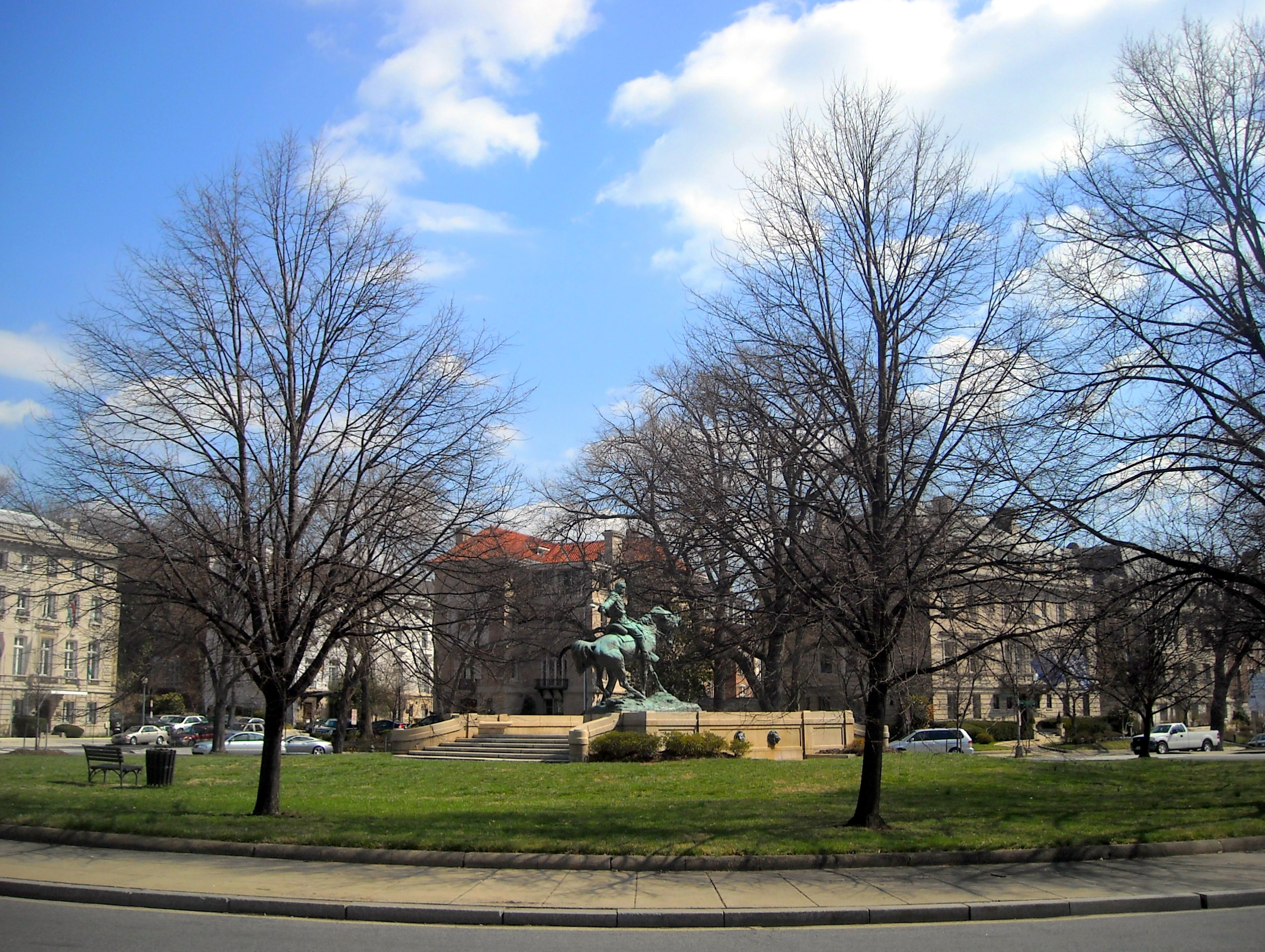
Sheridan Circle

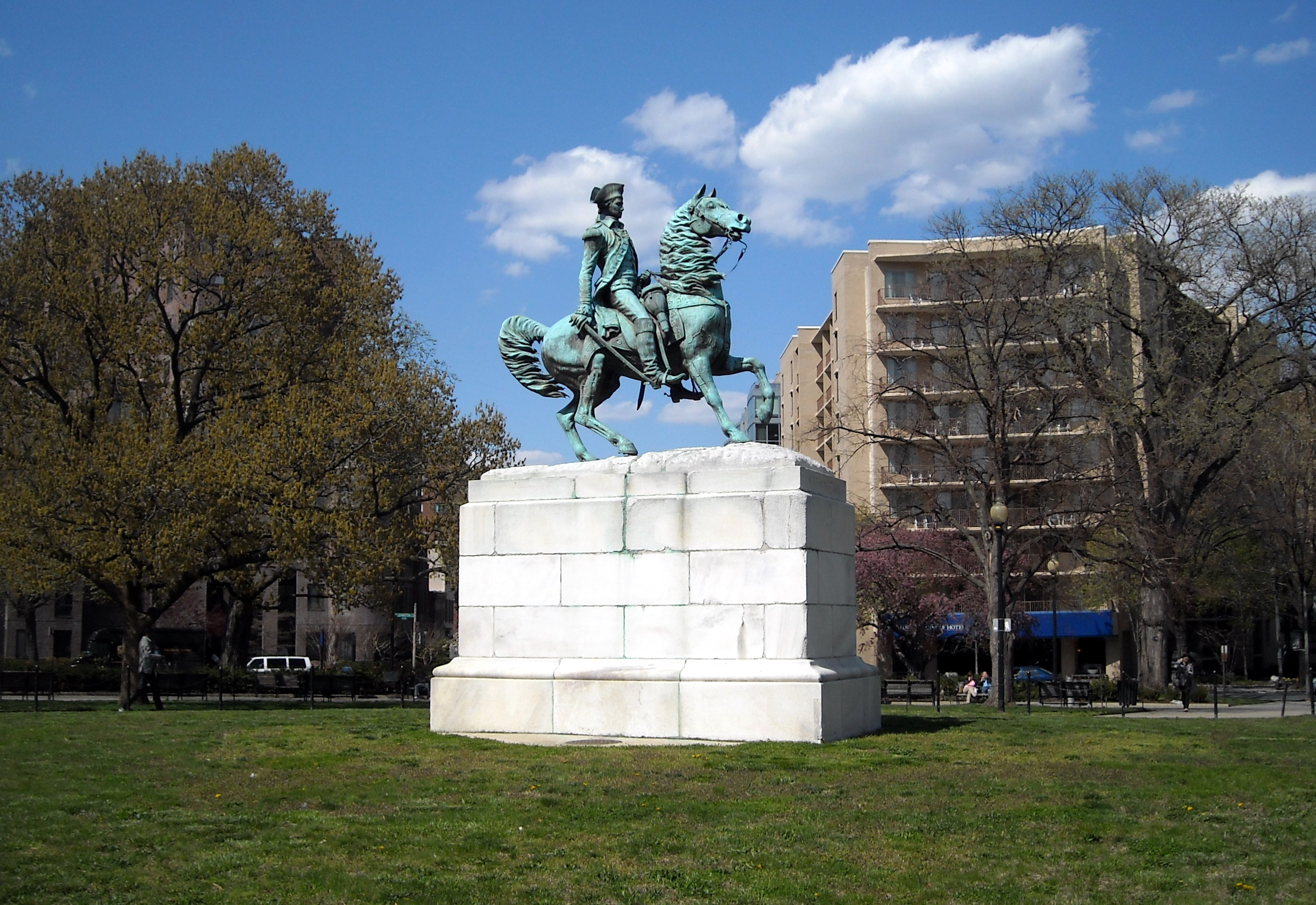
Washington Circle

== See also ==
- Geography of Washington, D.C.
- Streets and highways of Washington, D.C.
- Transportation in Washington, D.C.
- United States Triumphal Arch
