= Anna J. Cooper Circle =

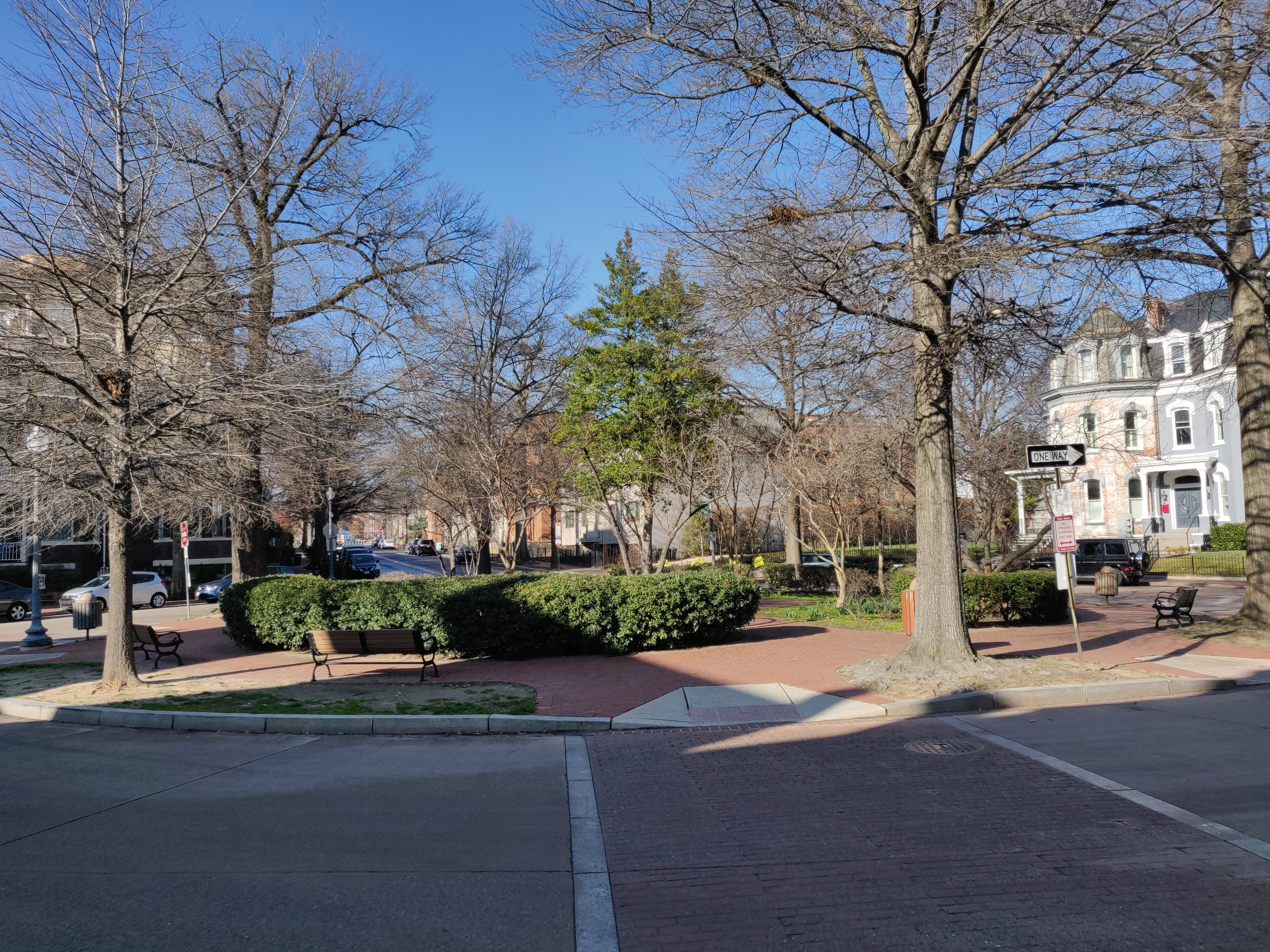
- Anna J. Cooper Circle in 2020

Location
- LeDroit Park, Northwest, Washington, D.C.
- Coordinates: 38°54′57.4″N 77°0′56.7″W
- Roads at junction: 3rd Street NW; T Street NW

Construction
- Type: Traffic circle
- Maintained by: DDOT

Anna J. Cooper Circle is a traffic circle and park at the intersection of 3rd and T Streets, Northwest, in the historic LeDroit Park neighborhood of Washington, D.C. In 1983, the circle was named in honor of Anna Julia Haywood Cooper (1858–1964), an author, educator, feminist, and influential African American scholar who once lived in LeDroit Park. The circle is the city's only roundabout named after a woman and serves as a focal point for the LeDroit Park Historic District. The park includes a sign providing historical information about Cooper.

== History ==
The LeDroit Park neighborhood south of Howard University was one of the first planned subdivisions in the Washington, D.C. area, when it was developed in 1873 by Amzi L. Barber and his brother-in-law Andrew Langdon. The neighborhood, named after Barber's father-in-law, LeDroit Langdon, was initially segregated and featured dozens of homes designed by architect James H. McGill.

The layout of the neighborhood included a traffic circle at the intersection of T and 3rd Streets NW, the latter being known as Harewood Avenue at the time. Developers envisioned the city's streetcars one day passing by this circle while heading north to the Armed Forces Retirement Home. The neighborhood originally included a wall and security guards to keep out black citizens, but a few years after the wall was torn down during a protest in 1888, the first black resident moved into LeDroit Park. The area would eventually be home to many prominent black citizens, including author and educator Dr. Anna J. Cooper. She lived at 201 T Street NW, a building that was later donated to Frelinghuysen University.

Up until the early 1980s the traffic circle, which was located near Cooper's former house, was known as Reservation 311. The local Advisory Neighborhood Commission asked DC Councilmember David A. Clarke to sponsor legislation that would rename the circle in honor of Cooper. The DC Council approved the bill in December 1982 and the renaming came into effect the following year. The interior of the traffic circle was later restored and landscaped at a cost of $90,000, providing a small park area. The traffic circle is the only one in Washington, D.C., that is named in honor of a woman.

The traffic circle's park, which The Washington Post described as a "pocket of escape" and authors John J. Protopappas and Judith Meany described as the "spiritual heart of the LeDroit Park community," features a sign by Cultural Tourism DC which gives people walking the LeDroit Park/Bloomingdale Heritage Trail information on Cooper's life story. The traffic circle also serves as a focal point for the LeDroit Park Historic District, which was listed on the National Register of Historic Places in 1974.

== See also ==
- Geography of Washington, D.C.
- List of circles in Washington, D.C.
