= Anna J. Cooper =

African-American author, educator, speaker, and scholar (1858–1964)

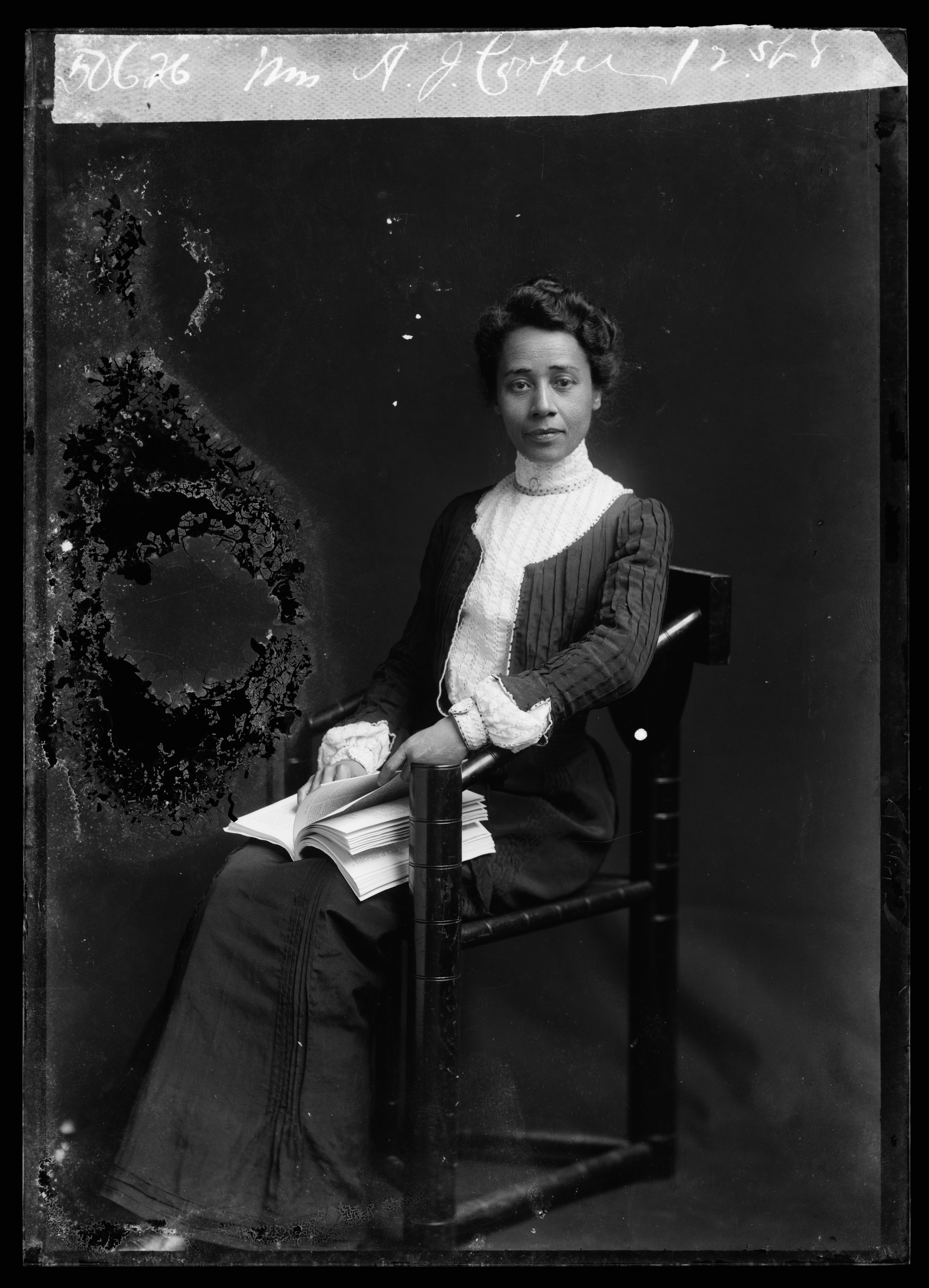
- Cooper c. 1902
- Born: Anna Julia Haywood; August 10, 1858; Raleigh, North Carolina, US
- Died: February 27, 1964 (aged 105); Washington, D.C., US
- Burial place: City Cemetery in Raleigh, NC
- Education: Oberlin College (BA, MA); University of Paris (PhD)
- Known for: Fourth African American woman to receive a PhD
- Spouse: George A. C. Cooper (m. 1877; died 1879)
- Children: Lula Love Lawson, John Love
- Mother: Hannah Stanley Haywood
- Relatives: John Haywood (grandfather)

Anna Julia Cooper (née Haywood; August 10, 1858 – February 27, 1964) was an African American author, educator, and activist. Although born enslaved, Cooper pursued higher education at Oberlin College in Ohio, where she earned a Bachelor of Arts in 1884 and a master's degree in mathematics in 1887. At the age of sixty-six, she completed her doctoral studies at the University of Paris, making her the fourth African American woman to earn a PhD. She was a well-known member of Washington, D.C.'s African-American community, and a member of Alpha Kappa Alpha sorority.

Cooper's scholarly contributions to sociology started with her first book, A Voice from the South: By a Black Woman of the South, which is widely acknowledged as one of the first articulations of Black feminism and gave her the often-used title of "the Mother of Black Feminism".

== Biography ==
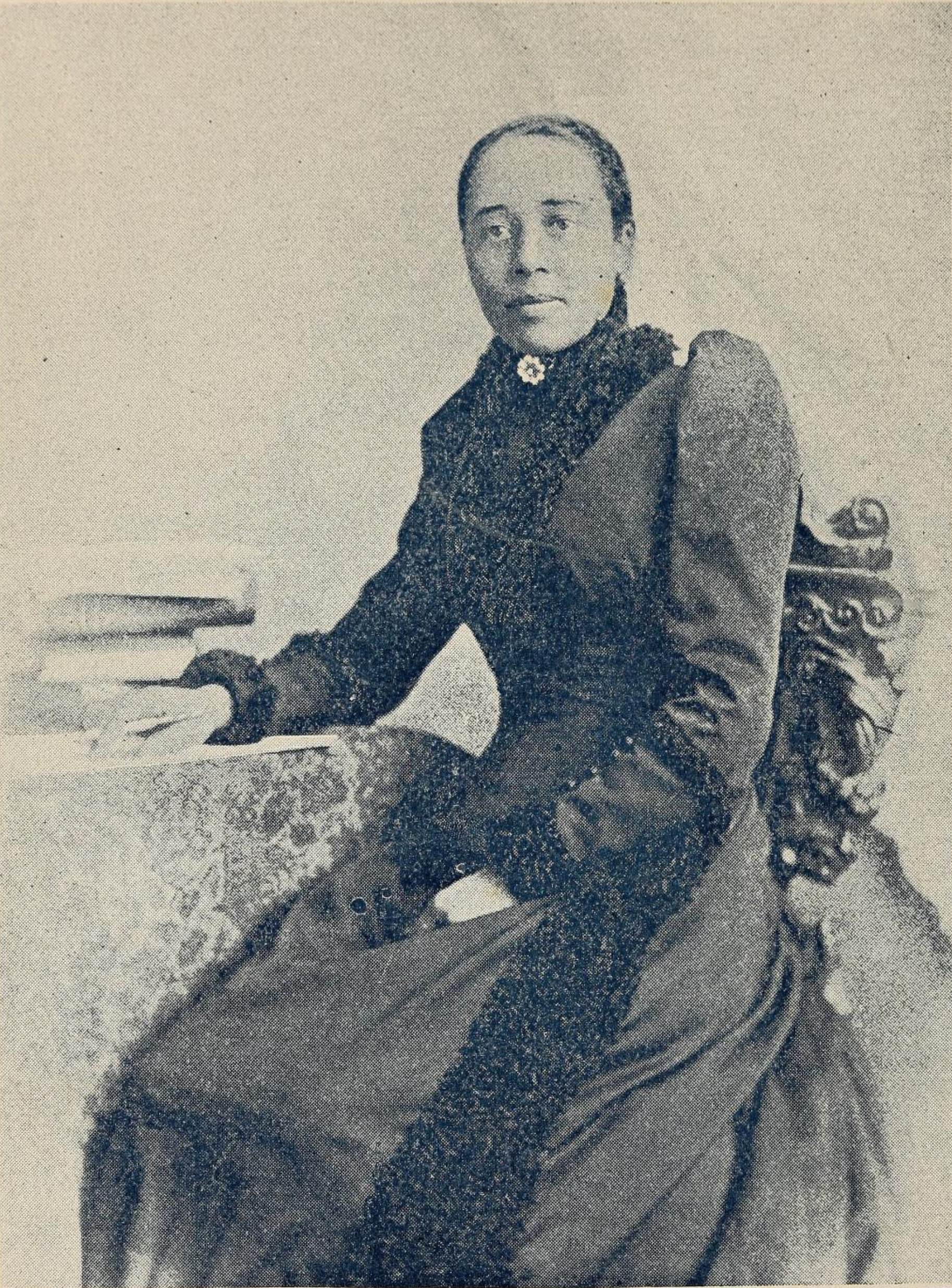
Cooper in 1892

=== Childhood ===
Anna "Annie" Julia Haywood was born enslaved in Raleigh, North Carolina, in 1858. She and her mother, Hannah Stanley Haywood, were enslaved by George Washington Haywood, one of the sons of North Carolina's longest-serving state Treasurer John Haywood, who helped found the University of North Carolina. Either George, who enslaved her mother, or his brother, Dr. Fabius Haywood, who enslaved her older brothers, Rufus and Andrew, was probably Anna's father; Anna's mother refused to clarify paternity. George became state attorney for Wake County, North Carolina, and together with a brother owned a plantation in Greene County, Alabama.

Cooper worked as a domestic servant in the Haywood home and had the two aforementioned older brothers. Andrew, enslaved by Fabius J. Haywood, later served in the Spanish–American War. Rufus was also born enslaved and became the leader of the musical group Stanley's Band.

=== Education ===
In 1868, when Cooper was nine years old, she received a scholarship and began her education at the newly opened Saint Augustine's Normal School and Collegiate Institute in Raleigh, North Carolina, founded by the local Episcopal diocese to train teachers to educate the formerly enslaved and their families. The Reverend J. Brinton offered Cooper a scholarship to help pay for her expenses. According to Mark S. Giles, a Cooper biographer, "the educational levels offered at St. Augustine ranged from primary to high school, including trade-skill training." During her 14 years at St. Augustine's, she distinguished herself as a bright and ambitious student who showed equal promise in both liberal arts and analytical disciplines such as mathematics and science; her subjects included languages (Latin, French, Greek), English literature, math, and science. Although the school had a special track reserved for women – dubbed the "Ladies' Course" – and the administration actively discouraged women from pursuing higher-level courses, Cooper fought for her right to take a course reserved for men by demonstrating her academic ability. During this period, St. Augustine's pedagogical emphasis was on training young men for the ministry and preparing them for additional training at four-year universities. One of these men, George A. C. Cooper, would later become her husband. He died after only two years of marriage.

Cooper's academic excellence enabled her to work as a tutor for younger children, which also helped her pay for her educational expenses. After completing her studies, she remained at the institution as an instructor. In the 1883–1884 school year, she taught classics, modern history, higher English, and vocal and instrumental music; she is not listed as faculty in the 1884–1885 year, but in the 1885–1886 year she is listed as "Instructor in Classic, Rhetoric, Etc." Her husband's early death may have contributed to her ability to continue teaching; if she had stayed married, she might have been encouraged or required to withdraw from the university to become a housewife.

After her husband's death, Cooper entered Oberlin College in Ohio, where she continued to follow the study designated for men, graduating in 1884. Given her academic qualifications, she was admitted as a sophomore. She often attempted to take four classes, rather than three as was prescribed by the college; she also was attracted to Oberlin by its reputation for music, but was unable to take as many classes in piano as she would have wished. Among her classmates were fellow black women Ida Gibbs (later Hunt) and Mary Church Terrell. At Oberlin, Cooper was part of the "LLS", "one of the two literary societies for women, whose regular programs featured lectures by distinguished speakers as well as singers and orchestras". After teaching briefly at Wilberforce University, she returned to St. Augustine's in 1885. She then returned to Oberlin and earned an M.A. in mathematics in 1888, making her one of the first two black women – along with Mary Church Terrell, who received her M.A. in the same year – to earn a master's degree. In 1890–1891 she published an essay on "Higher Education of Women", which argued for the benefits of black women being trained in classical literature, referring to both Socrates and Sappho among her examples, and demonstrated an interest in access to education which would inform much of her later career. In writing this essay, she preceded W. E. B. Du Bois' similar arguments in "Of the Training of Black Men" (The Souls of Black Folk, 1903) by almost a decade.

In 1900, she made her first trip to Europe to participate in the First Pan-African Conference in London, and then toured Europe: After visiting the cathedral towns of Scotland and England, she went to Paris for the World Exposition. "After a week at the Exposition, she went to Oberammergau to see the Passion Play, thence to Munich and other German towns, and then to Italy through Rome, Naples, Venice, Pompeii, Mt. Vesuvius, and Florence."

=== Washington, DC years ===
She later moved to Washington, DC. In 1892, Cooper, Helen Appo Cook, Ida B. Wells, Charlotte Forten Grimké, Mary Jane Peterson, Mary Church Terrell, and Evelyn Shaw formed the Colored Women's League in Washington, D.C. The goals of the service-oriented club were to promote unity, social progress, and the best interests of the African-American community. Cook was elected president.

Cooper developed a close friendship with Grimké, and later wrote a memoir about the Grimké Family, titled "The Early Years in Washington: Reminiscences of Life with the Grimkés," which appeared in Personal Recollections of the Grimké family and the Life and Writings of Charlotte Forten Grimké (privately published in 1951).

She began as a tenured teacher, teaching Latin, math and science at M Street High School, becoming principal in 1901 or 1902. She later became entangled in a controversy involving the differing attitudes about black education, as she advocated for a model of classical education espoused by W. E. B. Du Bois, "designed to prepare eligible students for higher education and leadership", rather than the vocational program that was promoted by Booker T. Washington. This approach to the education of black students clashed with the backlash over Reconstruction gains in Black civil and political rights, and resulted in the D.C. School Board refusing to reappoint her in 1906. Later, she was recalled to M Street, and she fit her work on her doctoral thesis into "nooks and crannies of free time".

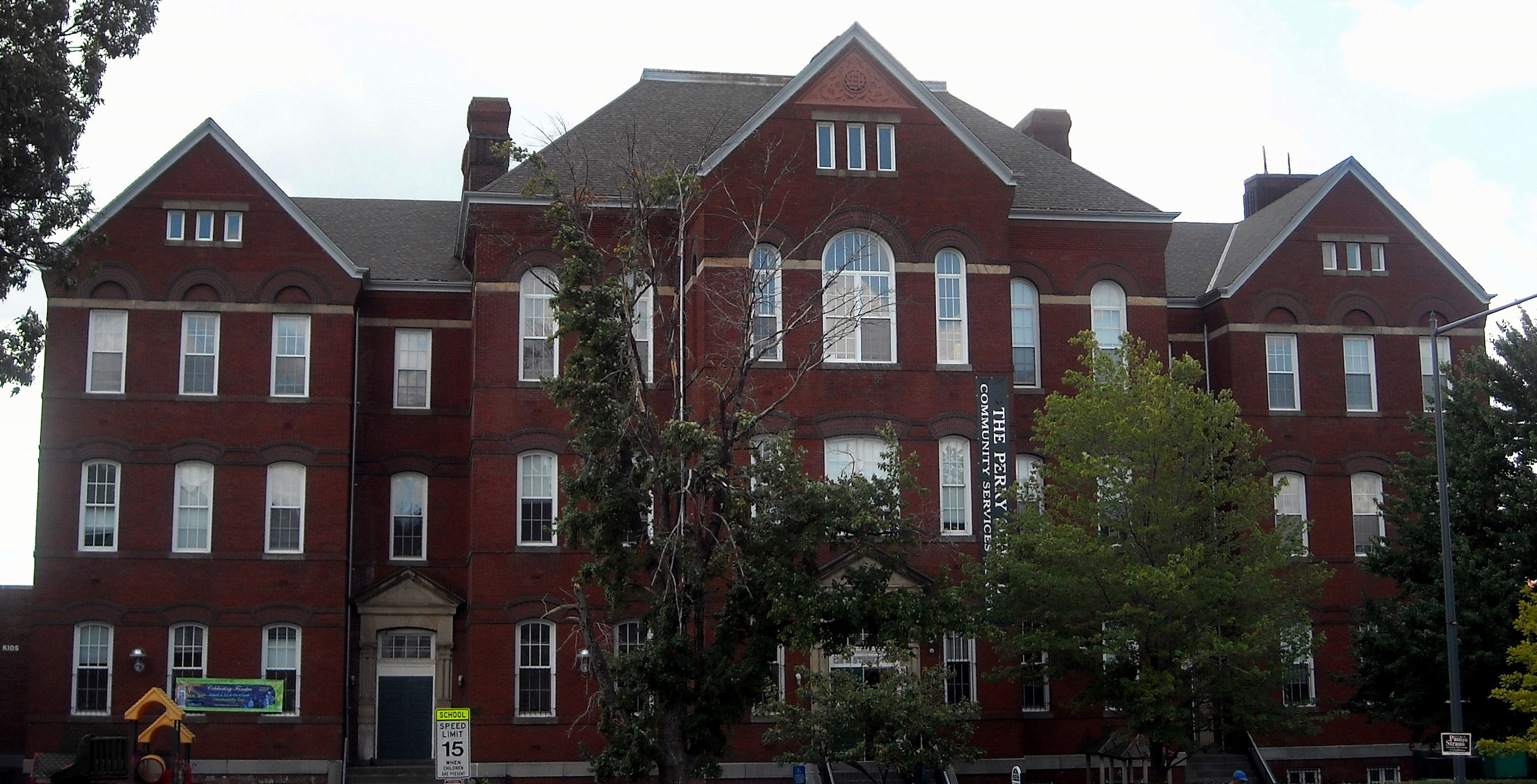
M Street School

=== A Voice from the South ===
During her years as a teacher and principal at M Street High School, Cooper also completed her first book, titled A Voice from the South: By a Black Woman of the South, published in 1892, and delivered many speeches calling for civil rights and women's rights. The book is widely viewed as one of the first articulations of black feminism and advanced a vision of self-determination through education and social uplift for African-American women. Its central thesis was that black women's educational, moral, and spiritual progress would improve the general standing of the African-American community. She says that men's violent natures often counter the goals of higher education, so it is essential to foster more female intellectuals because they will bring more elegance to education.

This view was criticized by some as submissive to the 19th-century cult of true womanhood, but others label it as one of the most important arguments for Black feminism in the 19th century. Cooper advanced the view that educated and successful black women must support their underprivileged peers in achieving their goals. The essays in A Voice from the South also touched other topics such as the socioeconomic realities of Black families and the administration of the Episcopal Church.

A Voice from the South received significant praise from leaders in the black community. It was widely praised within the Black community and among intellectuals for its pioneering ideas on race, gender, and education.

=== Later years ===
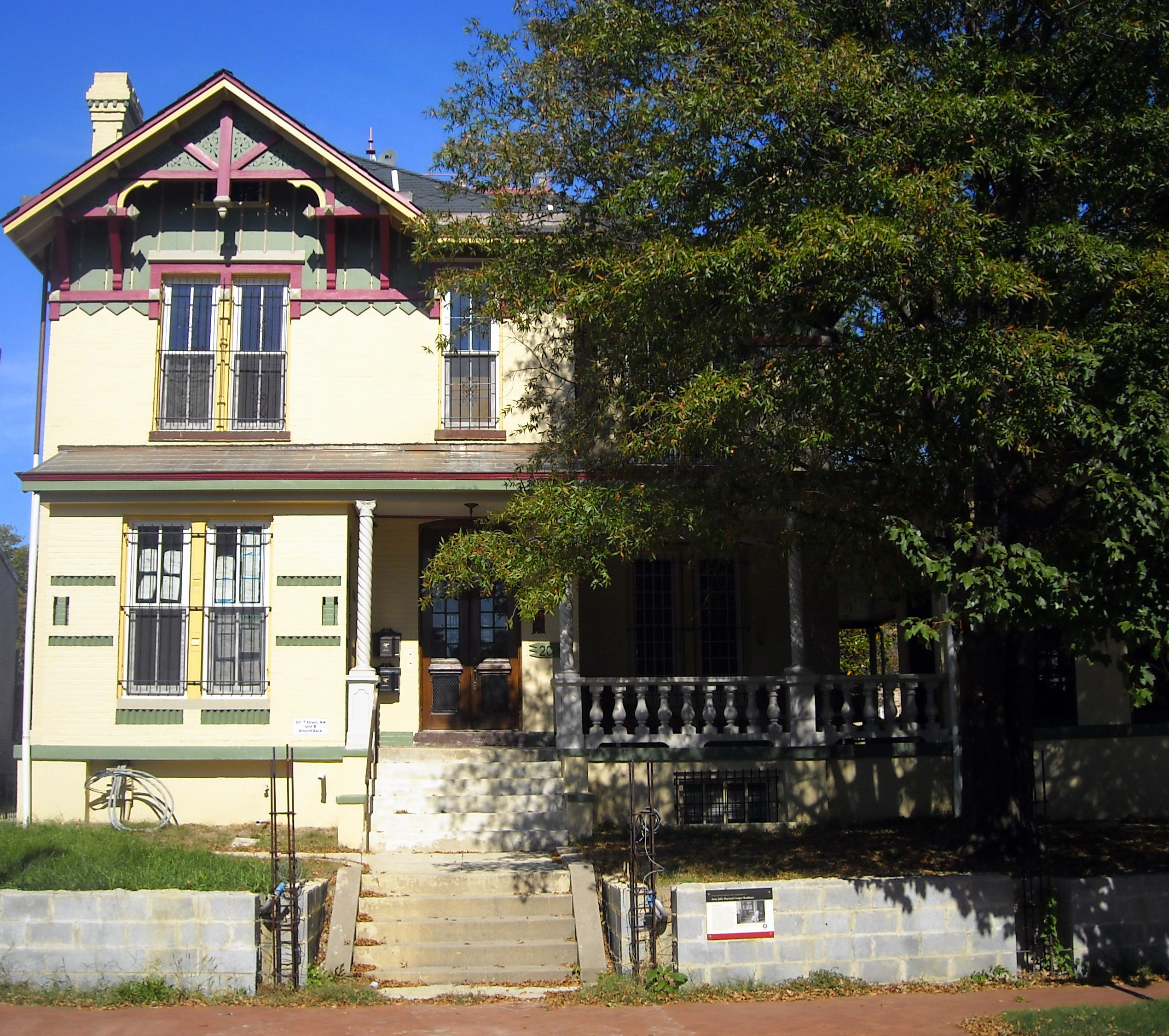
Former home of Anna J. Cooper in the LeDroit Park neighborhood of Washington, D.C. The home is located beside Anna J. Cooper Circle.

Cooper was an author, educator, and public speaker. In 1893, she delivered the opening address at the World's Congress of Representative Women in Chicago. She was one of five African-American women invited to speak at this event, along with: Fannie Barrier Williams, Sarah Jane Woodson Early, Hallie Quinn Brown, and Fanny Jackson Coppin.

In a 1902 speech, she said:

A nation's greatness is not dependent upon the things it make and uses. Things without thots [ sic] are mere vulgarities. America can boast her expanse of territory, her gilded domes, her paving stones of silver dollars; but the question of deepest moment in this nation today is its men and its women, the elevation at which it receives its "vision" into the firmament of eternal truth.

— "The Ethics of the Negro Question", September 5, 1902

In 1914, at 56, Cooper began courses for her doctoral degree at Columbia University. However, she was forced to interrupt her studies in 1915 when she adopted her late half-brother's five children upon their mother's death. Later, she transferred her credits to the University of Paris, which did not accept her Columbia thesis, an edition of Le Pèlerinage de Charlemagne. Over a decade, she researched and composed her dissertation, completing her coursework in 1924. Cooper defended her thesis "The Attitude of France on the Question of Slavery Between 1789 and 1848" in 1925. Cooper's retirement from Washington Colored High School in 1930 was not the end of her political activism. The same year she retired, she accepted the position of president at Frelinghuysen University, a school founded to provide classes for DC residents lacking access to higher education. Cooper worked for Frelinghuysen for twenty years, first as president and then as registrar, and left the school only a decade before she died in 1964 at the age of 105. At the age of 65, she became the fourth Black woman in American history to earn a Doctor of Philosophy degree. Her work was eventually published in an anthology of medieval French literature and was requested for classes and the bookstore at Harvard.

=== Frelinghuysen University ===
In 1929, Cooper was elected to succeed Jesse Lawson as president of Frelinghuysen University, a post she assumed in 1930. Under Cooper's leadership in the 1930s, Frelinghuysen University focused on increasing literacy among the African American working poor and providing liberal arts and vocational education for unskilled workers. Karen A. Johnson writes in "In Service for the Common Good" Anna Julia Cooper and Adult Education that Cooper practiced a "decolonizing pedagogy", further saying:

Cooper believed that the essential purpose for a "decolonizing" approach to adult education content was to assist her students in developing their abilities to question dominant thought ... Cooper's ultimate goal for her learning adults was their preparation for intellectual enlightenment as well as to equip them to battle for a better society at large.

After the university found servicing its mortgage prohibitive, she moved the institution to her own house. Cooper retired from her position as president in 1940, but she continued her involvement with the university, taking a position as its registrar.

=== Impact on education ===
Anna Julia Cooper's educational philosophy was deeply rooted in the belief that education is a transformative tool for social change and racial uplift, particularly for African Americans. As an educator and later the president of Frelinghuysen University, Cooper championed a holistic approach to learning that went beyond mere vocational training. She emphasized that education should cultivate critical thinking, self-improvement, and active civic engagement, preparing students to be not only skilled but socially responsible individuals.

Scholars argue that Anna Julia Cooper's work has been overshadowed by more celebrated figures like W.E.B. Du Bois, even though her contributions often preceded or paralleled his ideas. For example, Cooper addressed concepts akin to “double consciousness” and critiqued portrayals of Black Americans in literature well before Du Bois, who frequently referenced her ideas without providing proper attribution.

=== Death ===
On February 27, 1964, Cooper died in Washington, D.C., at the age of 105 from a heart attack. Her memorial was held in a chapel on the campus of Saint Augustine's College, in Raleigh, North Carolina, where her academic career began. She was buried alongside her husband at the City Cemetery in Raleigh.

== Legacy ==
Cooper's work was foundational for Black feminist thought and anticipated later concepts of intersectionality, as her writings underscored the interconnected struggles faced by Black women. Scholars today recognize her influence on both feminist and civil rights movements.

Her book A Voice from the South remains a seminal work in Black feminist theory and is widely cited in courses on sociology, history, and gender studies, solidifying her position as a foundational thinker.

In 2009, a tuition-free private middle school was opened and named in her honor, the Anna Julia Cooper Episcopal School on historic Church Hill in Richmond, Virginia.

The Anna Julia Cooper Center on Gender, Race, and Politics in the South at Wake Forest University was established in Anna Cooper's honor. Melissa Harris-Perry is the founding director.

There is an Anna Julia Cooper Professor of Women's Studies at Spelman College.

Anna Julia Cooper is the only African American woman to be quoted in the U.S. Passport. Pages 24 and 25 of the 2016 United States passport contain the following quotation: "The cause of freedom is not the cause of a race or a sect, a party or a class – it is the cause of humankind, the very birthright of humanity." – Anna Julia Cooper

In 2009, the United States Postal Service released a commemorative stamp in Cooper's honor. The 44-cent First-Class commemorative stamp of Anna Julia Cooper showcases a portrait painted by Kadir Nelson from San Diego, California, which he created based on an undated photograph of Cooper.

Cooper's career was dramatized in Tempestuous Elements, a play by Kia Corthron, premiered at Washington's Arena Stage in 2024.

Cooper is honored on the liturgical calendar of the Episcopal Church (USA) on February 28, underscoring the recognition of her social and educational contributions within religious communities. Liturgical commemorations of her life and ministry have taken place since at least 2017.

== Timeline ==
- 1858: Born enslaved in Raleigh, North Carolina.
- 1877: Marries George A. C. Cooper.
- 1879: Husband dies, and Anna is widowed at 21 years of age.
- 1887: Begins teaching math and Latin at the Preparatory School.
- 1888: Becomes one of the first black women to earn a master's degree from Oberlin College.
- 1891: Participates in the weekly "Saturday Circle" or "Saturday Nighters" salon of Black Washingtonians.
- 1892: Publishes "A Voice From The South By a Black Woman of the South".
- 1892: Founded the Colored Women's League with Helen Appo Cook.
- 1893: Co-hosts anti-lynching activist Ida B. Wells with Frederick Douglass and Lucy Ellen Moten
- 1893: Becomes only woman elected to the American Negro Academy.
- 1893: Attends the World's Congress of Representative Women and reads paper titled "The Intellectual Progress of the Colored Women of the United States since the Emancipation Proclamation"
- 1900: Attends the First Pan-African Conference in London, reads paper titled "The Negro Problem in America", and joins the executive committee.
- 1901: Becomes second Black female principal of M. Street High School.
- 1925: Earns doctorate from University of Paris, purchases home in LeDroit Park, begins hosting monthly "Les Amis de la Langue Francaise".
- 1929: Becomes second president of Frelinghuysen University in Washington, D.C.
- 1940: Becomes registrar of Frelinghuysen University and hosts classes in her LeDroit home.
- 1964: February 27: Anna J. Cooper dies in Washington, D.C. at the age of 105.

== Works ==
- Cooper, Anna Julia (1892). A Voice From the South. Xenia, Ohio: Aldine Printing House.
  - —— (1990). Washington, Mary Helen (ed.). A Voice From the South. Oxford University Press. ISBN 9780195063233.
  - —— (2016). Neary, Janet (ed.). A Voice From the South. Dover Publications. ISBN 978-0486805634.
- ——; Koschwitz, Eduard; Klein, Félix (1925). Le Pèlerinage de Charlemagne. Paris: A. Lahure. OCLC 578022221.
- —— (1925). L'attitude de la France à l'égard de l'esclavage pendant la révolution. Published Materials by Anna J. Cooper (Doctoral thesis) (in French). Paris: Imprimerie de la Cour D'appel – via Howard University.
  - —— (1988). Frances Richardson Keller (ed.). Slavery and the French revolutionists (1788–1805). Translated by Keller. Lewiston, New York: Edwin Mellen Press. ISBN 978-0889466371. Translation of the author's 1925 doctoral thesis.
- —— (1998). Lemert, Charles (ed.). The Voice of Anna Julia Cooper: Including A Voice From the South and Other Important Essays, Papers, and Letters. Rowman & Littlefield. ISBN 9780847684083.

== See also ==
- African-American history
- African-American literature
- List of African-American writers
- List of Alpha Kappa Alpha sisters
- List of centenarians
- List of people on stamps of the United States
- List of feminist rhetoricians

== Reference bibliography ==
- Belle, Kathryn Sophia (April 7, 2025), "Anna Julia Cooper", in Zalta, Edward N.; Nodelman, Uri (eds.), The Stanford Encyclopedia of Philosophy
- Evans, Stephanie Y. (2008). Black Women in the Ivory Tower, 1850–1954: An Intellectual History. University Press of Florida. ISBN 978-0-8130-4520-7.
- Hutchinson, Louise Daniel (1981). Anna J. Cooper, A Voice From the South. Washington: Published for the Anacostia Neighborhood Museum of the Smithsonian Institution by the Smithsonian Institution Press. ISBN 978-0874745283.
- Moody-Turner, Shirley; Evans, Sabrina (August 20, 2024), "Anna Julia Cooper", Oxford Bibliobraphies: American Literature, Oxford University Press, doi:10.1093/obo/9780199827251-0153, ISBN 978-0-19-982725-1
