= Geography of Washington =

Geography of Washington may refer to:

- Geography of Washington (state)
- Geography of Washington, D.C.
