= Events DC =

Sports and entertainment authority for the Washington, D.C. government

- Industry: Tourism; conventions; sports
- Founded: 2009; 17 years ago
- Headquarters: Washington, D.C., U.S.
- Key people: Angie M. Gates (President & CEO)
- Total assets: Walter E. Washington Convention Center; Nationals Park; RFK Stadium; D.C. Armory; CareFirst Arena; Carnegie Library
- Website: eventsdc.com

Events DC is the convention, sports and entertainment authority for Washington, D.C. Events DC owns and manages the Walter E. Washington Convention Center, CareFirst Arena, and Nationals Park, among other DC venues. It also promotes, sponsors and attracts sporting and cultural events to the District.

== History ==
The Washington Sports and Convention Authority (WSCA) was formed on October 1, 2009, following the merger of the Washington Convention Center Authority (WCCA) and the D.C. Sports and Entertainment Commission (DCSEC). The plan was announced by D.C. Mayor Adrian Fenty as a cost saving measure in his 2010 budget proposal. In 2011, the WSCA was renamed Events DC to align with the other brands of the District and its tourism arm, Destination DC. In 2022, Events DC acquired Cultural Tourism DC; since 2009, Events DC had provided financial and operational support to CTDC and its cultural heritage events.

== Leadership ==
Angie M. Gates serves as the current President and CEO of Events DC following the departure of longstanding former president and CEO Greg O'Dell in March 2022.

== Operations ==
Events DC receives more than $100 million in taxpayer money but has an independent board appointed by the Mayor. In addition to overseeing the Walter E. Washington Convention Center, Nationals Park, RFK Stadium, CareFirst Arena, and the D.C. Armory, it has provided funding to various construction and development projects in the District. It provided more than $200 million in public money into construction of the Marriott Marquis convention center hotel and acquired the rights to the Carnegie Library. In 2017 and 2018, Events DC spent $150,000 to unsuccessfully lobby Congress to give the District greater authority over RFK Stadium. Events DC also oversees a community grants program which awards deserving non-profit organizations with grants each year. In 2022, Events DC awarded 39 local nonprofits grants totaling $500,000.

=== Convention center and hotel ===
As part of the $520 million construction of the Marriott Marquis which opened in 2014, Events DC expected an increase in citywide conventions. DC hosted 22 conventions in 2011 but only 15 in 2015 and 2016. In October 2015, the DC auditor called on Events DC to increase profitability of the Convention Center after it fell below the average revenues and higher expenses per square foot of 13 other large convention centers studied.

Events DC was responsible for training staff to work at the Marriott Marquis, which had a requirement of hiring district residents for 51 percent of the hotel's staff as a condition of its public financing. Events DC trained and referred 719 District residents to Marriott, while 178 were hired by the hotel, which did not meet the local staffing requirement.

In June 2016, former convention center employees filed suit against Events DC for unpaid wages. They allegedly worked overtime on various tasks but were denied comp time.

=== Nationals Park ===
Nationals Park, which opened in 2008, is managed by Events DC and built almost entirely with taxpayer funding.

=== CareFirst Arena ===
In 2016, it was announced that Events DC would play a prominent role in the $55 million construction of an arena on the site of St. Elizabeths Hospital that would serve as a practice facility for the Washington Wizards and the new home venue for the Washington Mystics. Members of the DC Council sought to introduce legislation capping public expenditure in the case of cost overruns. On July 28, O'Dell requested an additional $10 million in funding while decreasing the number of seats in the facility. He said earlier estimates were premature. In 2018, O'Dell announced that the cost had increased to $68.8 million, due in part to additions like drywall, and catwalks and higher than anticipated costs like contractors.

O'Dell boasted about the number of local business used in the construction of the facility, but could not provide a list of any of the businesses. Local businesses reported that they were unable to find work at the site. Events DC significantly underestimated the costs of operating the facility and in 2019 the Events DC board approved more than $1 million in additional costs.

=== Carnegie Library ===
In 2014, Events DC twice sought to move the International Spy Museum into the Carnegie Library of Washington D.C., but failed to win historic preservation approval. In December 2016, Events DC announced an agreement with Apple to turn the library into a new store for the company, designed by Foster and Partners.

=== Esports ===
In 2018, Events DC announced a partnership with Red Bull intended to capitalize on the esports market. It was later revealed that Events DC chairman Max Brown had extensive ties with the industry as an investor and lobbyist. Events DC was the main jersey sponsor of the defunct Overwatch League team Washington Justice.

=== Community services ===
In December 2009, Events DC, then known as WCSA, was criticized for quoting a usage fee of $77,000 to a nonprofit organization, Remote Area Medical, who wished to use the D.C. Armory to host free health clinics.
