= A Voice from the South =

Book by Anna J. Cooper (1892)

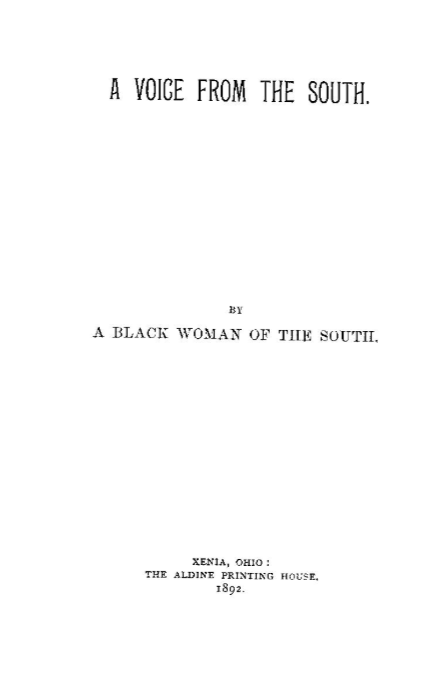
- Title page for A Voice from the South: By a Black Woman of the South (1892)
- Author: Anna J. Cooper
- Publication date: 1892
- Publication place: United States

A Voice from the South: By a Black Woman of the South is the first book by American author, educator, and activist Anna J. Cooper. First published in 1892, the book is widely viewed as one of the first articulations of Black feminism. The book is divided into two parts, "Soprano Obligato" and "Tutti Ad Libitum". Each section contains four individual essays. This book led to the term "Cooperian" being coined when speaking about Anna J. Cooper. It is considered one of the first, full-length Black feminist texts.

== Overview ==
A Voice from the South compiles a series of essays that touched on a variety of topics, such as race and racism, gender, the socioeconomic realities of Black families, and the administration of the Episcopal Church.

The book advanced a vision of self-determination through education and social uplift for African-American women. Its central thesis was that the educational, moral, and spiritual progress of Black women would improve the general standing of the entire African-American community. She says that the violent natures of men often run counter to the goals of higher education, so it is important to foster more female intellectuals because they will bring more elegance to education. She noted Black women whose accomplishments could rival those of men, including Phillis Wheatley, Sojourner Truth, Fanny Jackson Coppin, and Edmonia Lewis. Cooper advanced the view that it was the duty of educated and successful Black women to support their underprivileged peers in achieving their goals. Through this view Cooper's style was deemed "Cooperian", as a direct comparison to other male canonical theorists.

This view was criticized by some as submissive to the 19th-century cult of true womanhood, but others label it as one of the most important arguments for Black feminism in the 19th century.

A Voice from the South was published during a period that saw a burst of intellectual publications by Black women. Cooper's book was published the same year as Lucy Delaney's From the Darkness Cometh the Light; or, Struggles for Freedom, Ida B. Wells's Southern Horrors: Lynch Law in All Its Phases, and Frances Ellen Watkins Harper's Iola Leroy; or, Shadows Uplifted.

== Summary ==
A Voice from the South is broken into two parts, with four essays each. The book is dedicated to Bishop Benjamin William Arnett. The opening page states,

With regret
I forget
If the song of living yet,
Yet, remember, vaguely now,
It was honest, anyhow

=== Soprano Obligato ===
This section begins with a quote from George Eliot about Royal Hearted Women.

==== Womanhood a vital element in the regeneration and progress of a race ====
This essay begins with an assessment of the Qur'an and how societal views of women are equivalent to the practice of Chinese foot binding. She follows these assessments with a claim that societal leaders do not understand women. Cooper makes the large claim that the American system's happiness relies on its ability to grow, and that the only way for the nation to grow is with the influence of women. The essay says that Christianity has not accepted the practice of chivalry yet, and that even those who believed in God were still suffering. She expresses her fear of chivalry and is worried that it means respect for few women, rather than all. The church had been hard on women during the middle ages by giving a negative relationship with the idea of consummating a marriage. Yet, the clergy who actively partakes in the indoctrination of woman, are having many children, such as Henry, Bishop of Liege, who had twenty-two children in fourteen years. She then accuses men of not loving/ taking care of women as ordered in Christianity. She adds that Black girls of the south are the most abandoned, as they do not have their fathers or brothers to protect them from other men. The theme of this chapter is that "real progress is growth".

==== The Higher Education of Woman ====
Cooper introduces the idea of higher education for women by bringing up the book "Shall Women Learn the Alphabet" by Silvain Marechal. This book introduces the idea of illegalizing education for woman out of fear that they would lose their womanliness, and refuse to continue "sewing on buttons" and "embroidering slippers". This led to a college introducing a ladies course, and because of its success many other colleges followed suit. She criticizes Christianity and westerners, by comparing them to barbarians. She also introduces a woman she admires for her intelligence named Mrs. Mary A. Livermore. She reflects on the fact that woman often give away little pieces of themselves, while also explaining Oberlin. Saying that if woman are ignored or placated there will be no true change. She calls for the education of women on the grounds that for change to occur there must be equality between the sexes, and names many original thinkers of this idea, such as Sappho, Aspasia, and Olympia Fulvia Morata. She then questions if educated women are desirable in marriages, answering with a confession of her own ignorance on the topic. Cooper then gives statistics for female high school graduates, with the highest only being twelve and the lowest had none. The theme of this chapter is "we must educate our women for change".

==== Woman Versus the Indian ====
The title of this essay comes from "thoughtful" and "suggestive" papers read by Rev. Anna Shaw at the National Women's Council in Washington in February 1891. Cooper introduces the woman's club Wimodaughsis, which had a secretary who was disgusted by the concept of Black people learning to read, specifically Black women. Cooper then criticizes Susan B. Anthony and Anna Shaw, as they came from plantation owners, yet claimed to be fighting for equality. Cooper calls this period the "Age of Organizations". She then claims that women in America are responsible for manners. She also states that the American woman is the queen of the drawing room and is equally afraid of losing caste as the Brahmin in India. Cooper says that Black women of the south have to do a lot of traveling, normally alone. While Cooper doesn't want to mention it, she does explain that it is significantly more dangerous for an unaccompanied Black woman than an unaccompanied White woman traveling alone. She works to lift the blame from public servants, as they must obey the laws that have been put in place. Giving the example of being in the wrong train car as a Black woman during segregation. She also explains the difference between people simply following the laws and people who enjoy the suffering of Black people, such as the conductor informing her she is in the wrong car versus threatening her. Cooper contemplates the fault that should be placed on southern women. Should they be held at fault for the wrongdoings or should they be excused because they are also in unsafe circumstances? She also condemns the south for being coated in blue blood. She explains that oppression is still running rampant in the United States even after passing the 14th and 15th Amendments. The theme is "women must be equal in order to achieve the desired effects of the Women's rights movement".

==== The Status of Women in America ====
Cooper begins by listing American women who have helped to alter the United States such as, Dorothea Dix, Helen Hunt Jackson, and Lucretia Mott. She speaks about the mutual destructiveness of the American Civil War, and how it led to women losing people unnecessarily. She also makes a point to mention names to make sure they are not lost to time or false narratives that surround them. She condemns the desires for "quick returns and large profits" as they cause things to become "unsanitary, well nigh inhuman investments". She speaks about the treatment of lower class and African American's and how they were subject to disease, pain, and loss from those who are societal leaders. She refers to women as "sympathetic warmth and sunshine". Cooper explains how the jobs of women have changed since the Pioneer days to the Civil Rights Movement. She references the start of the Women's rights movement, giving credit to the Woman's Christian Temperance Union (W.C.T.U.), and bringing attention to the struggles of Black Women. Also acknowledging that women's role in government was minute at the time. She also claims that women are the reason for men's strengths in politics. She closes out this chapter by naming more influential women, Amanda Smith, Sarah Woodson Early, Martha Briggs, Charlotte Forten Grimké, Hallie Quinn Brown, and Fanny Jackson Coppin. The conclusion of the chapter makes a final claim of the importance of women and how America's society would be less advanced without them. The theme of this essay is "the importance of women in America".

=== Tutti Ad Libitum ===
This section begins with two quotes, one from Robert Browning and one from George Eliot's Felix Holt, the Radical, about the greatest problems in the world.

==== Has America a Race Problem; If so, How Can It Best Be Solved? ====
Cooper begins with the claim that there are only two types of peace, suppression and change. There is then reference to the harmony that God creates in the World, and between nature and humanity. She is not dismissing nor embracing either type of peace, instead claiming that there is a time and a place for each. She uses the ideals of motion and change to state that there can be no power gained through resistance. This is the reasoning behind her belief that there should be no divide between the races, regardless of origins. Cooper is calling racism a cult that ultimately leads to death. She then references a work of M. Guizot in which he is complaining about societies with Asian views. Cooper then pleads with the reader to differentiate this complaining from the Race problem as by this point the dominant race had already laid claim. Labeling Jesus Christ as one of the original democrats. She speaks again about how the dominant races suppress the minority of the regions. Cooper then brings up the earlier enslaved people who were often sold while pregnant in Ireland in order to earn more money. Just as Cooper's mother was sold, these people underwent similar situations and were unable to do anything to escape. Guizot is referenced for the third time when it is stated that "European Civilization has within it the promise of perpetual progress". This is what leads to the creation of Liberty. Progress will eventually halt if surrounded by exclusiveness and selfishness. Anna J. Cooper then references foot binding again, while comparing the construction of the Great Wall of China to the rule of Confucius. There is also a slight cultural diffusion taking place between the Asian and European countries during this time. The reader is then introduced to Cooper's opinions regarding the way settlers claimed America and the governments formation thereafter. She states the claim that "the supremacy of one race... can not ultimately prevail on a continent held in equilibrium...". She makes her final claim by finally stating that America does have a race problem, and she will do nothing about it, instead leaving it to God to solve.

==== One Phase of American Literature ====
In the beginning of the essay, Cooper questions the legitimacy of American Literature, as she believed that all literature came from England. While our authors took a while to break free from England's mold, they now have become well known. She calls writing holy, and natural. Additionally, claiming that nature's messages are simple and that we only miss them because we are obsessed with ourselves. She called the enslaved the silent factor, calling them resilient and indestructible. It spoke about their persecution. Then she proceeds to split authors into two categories, those who write because they please and those who have an idea to spread. Those who wrote because they wanted included: Shakespeare, George Eliot, Robert Browning, Poe, Bryant, Longfellow, and Mr. Howells. The preachers included: Milton, Carlyle, Whittier, Lowell, E.P. Roe, Bellamy, and Tourgee. She says most Black people belong to the second group, so that people would recognize them as intelligent, sentient people. She makes a point to mention Albion W. Tourgee, as he was an abolitionist writer. She then explains the plot of his book "Pactolus Prime". She also accuses the second group of being filled with those who only wish to spread hatred, and use God as an excuse. She compares the experiences of the Black person to the Indigenous people of the United States. She berates Napoleon for his acts against those who were not white. She references "art for arts sake" when speaking of Howell. She questions why white people believe they can make blanket statements about a race. Then continues to explain what exactly the grievances she has with authors are. Which is that they are not portrayed accurately. She has numerous book reviews throughout this essay. The theme of this chapter is "Be careful what you believe."

==== What are we Worth? ====
She starts off by questioning the worth of the African American after reviewing a quote by Henry Ward Beecher, but after trying to figure this out she casts aside all sentiment. She compares slaves to a leaking ship. She says that they cost a lot of money to keep operating. So she claims education is the most worth while investment a man can make. She then proceeds to try and work it out mathematically. She is infuriated by the lack of worth that people place on Black people. The theme of this chapter is that "you are worth more than your raw materials".

==== The Gain from a Belief ====
This essay is actually formatted as a story. The scene is set of a solitary man who is standing in the market place. The narrator compares man to a tiger, not immoral but mere unmoral. The narrator finally approaches the man with the simple words "Beyond that beyond?", referencing God. It then switches back to her typical style as she questions all the greats of the time. She also questions God again within this chapter and how he is shut out by the public. She then explains what faith means to her, which is :treating the truth as true". She says you cannot talk about the "Negro Problem" without believing and discussing God. She then calls to action all those who have remained unchanging in the movements of Black Rights during the time. The theme of this chapter "is help change the problem."
