= Colonial Village =

- Neighborhood of Washington, D.C.
- Map of Washington, D.C., with Colonial Village highlighted in red
- Coordinates: 38.9877°N 77.0424°W
- Country: United States
- District: Washington, D.C.
- Ward: Ward 4

Government
  - Councilmember: Janeese Lewis George
- Postal code: ZIP code

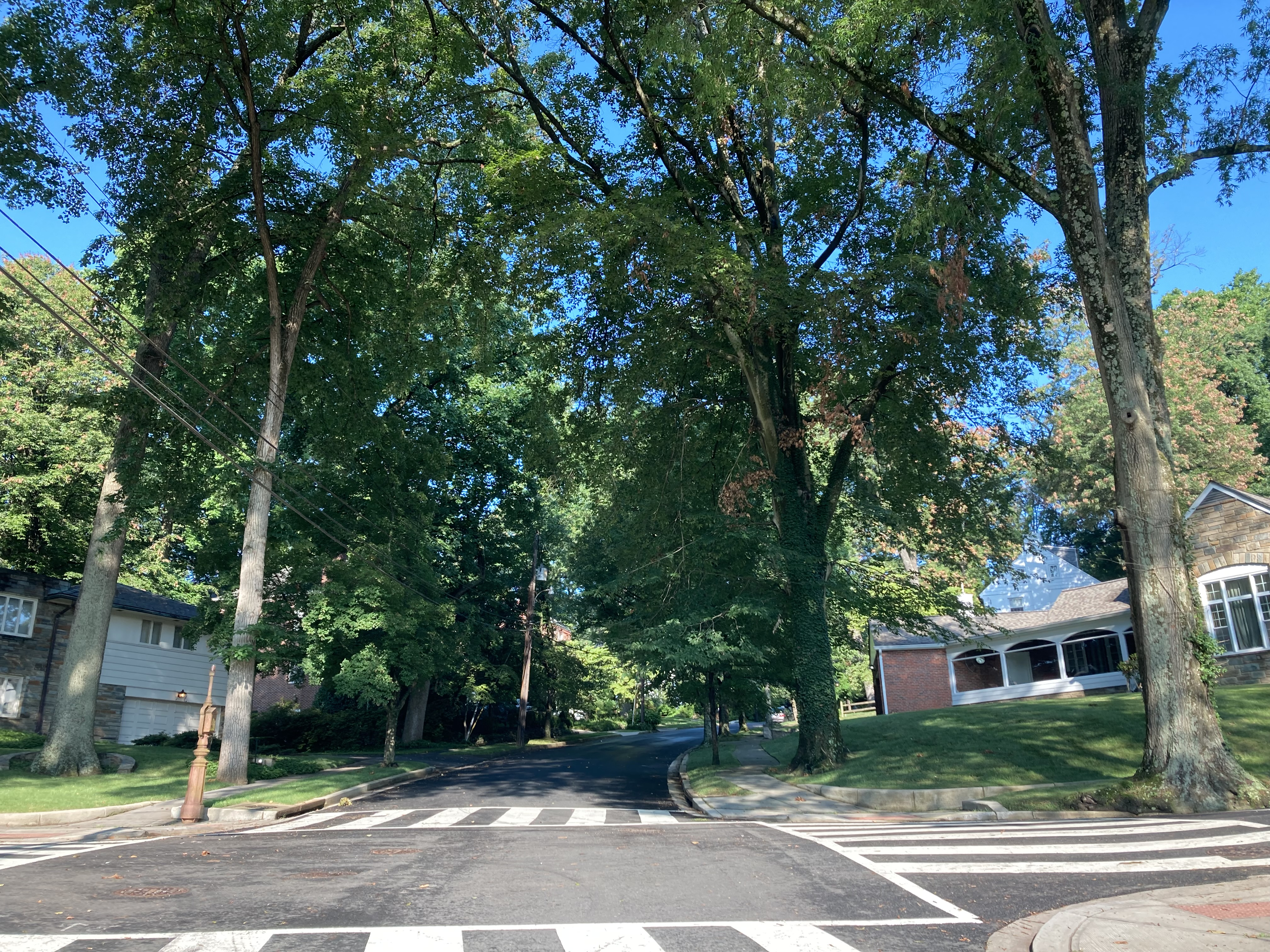
Intersection of Yorktown Rd. and Sudbury Rd. NW, in Colonial Village, July 2021.

Colonial Village is an area in northwest Washington, D.C., built in 1931 with 80 residences. The homes are reproductions of colonial buildings, such as the Moore House, where General Charles Cornwallis surrendered at Yorktown. The community was mostly Protestant, in contrast to the nearby 220-house North Portal Estates, which was a mostly Jewish neighborhood. When the community was first constructed in 1931, the neighborhood was exclusively populated by white Protestants as black and Jewish people were prohibited from living in Colonial Village. The land on which Colonial Village lies was once the 145 acre plantation of slaveowner Phillip Fenwick. After the mid-20th century, both Colonial Village and North Portal Estates became part of Shepherd Park.
