= Sherman Circle =

Traffic circle and neighborhood park in Washington DC

Coordinates: 38°56′50″N 77°01′19″W

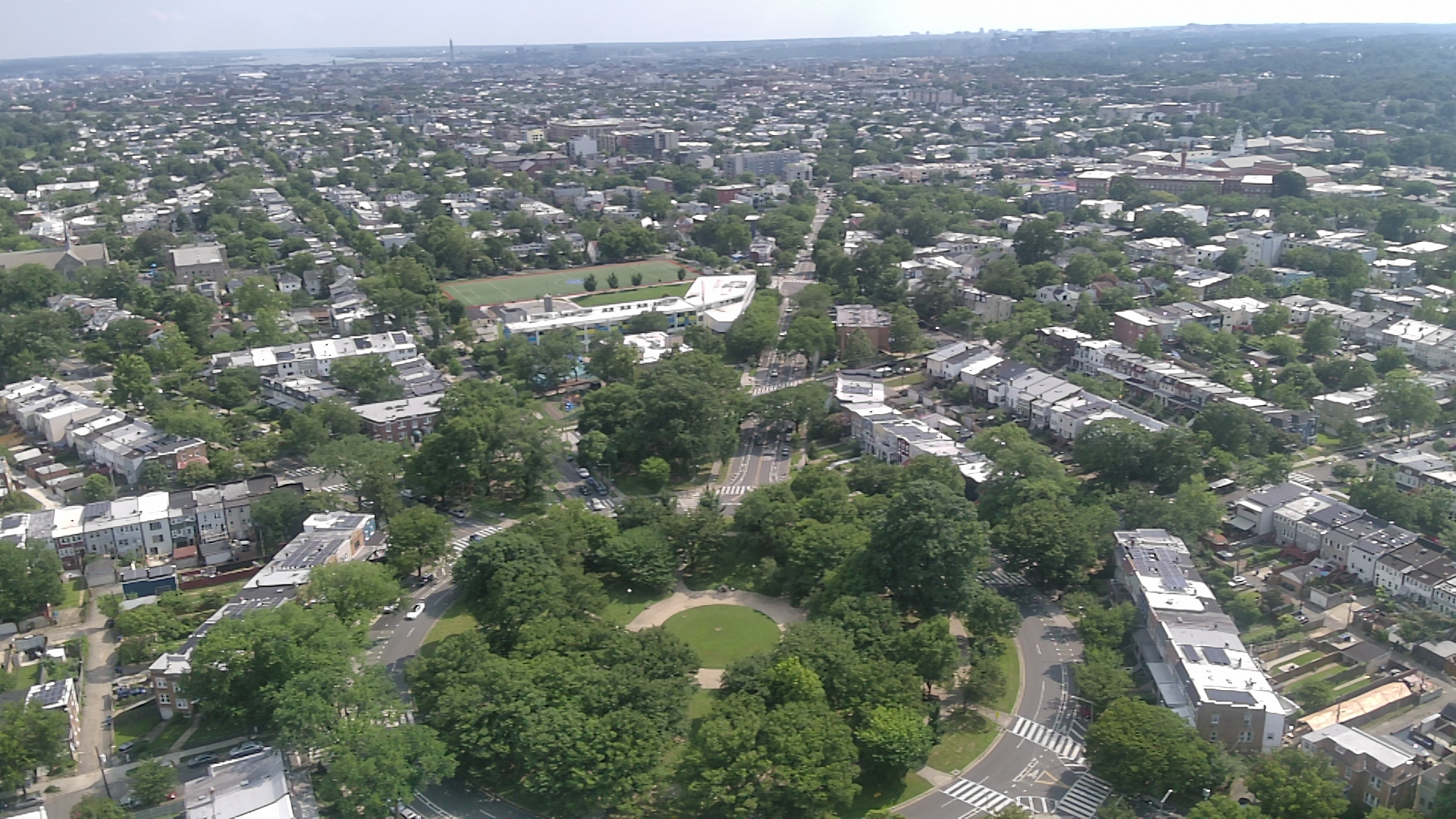
Sherman Circle

Sherman Circle is an urban park and traffic circle in the Northwest Washington, D.C. neighborhood of Petworth at the intersection of Illinois Avenue, Kansas Avenue, 7th Street, and Crittenden Street NW. The circle is named in honor of Civil War general William Tecumseh Sherman. Administered by the National Park Service's Rock Creek Park unit, Sherman Circle (U.S. Reservation 369) together with four surrounding triangular parks (U.S. Reservations 436, 438, 447, and 448) covers 3.44 acres (1.39 ha) and is considered by the National Park Service a "cultural landscape."

What became Sherman Circle and the four surrounding reservations were first documented in 1889 as part of the original plat of Petworth. It was not until 1923 that the five reservations were created. The design by landscape architect Irving W. Payne called for installing concrete walkways and planting trees, shrubs, grass, and perennials to reinforce the individual sites' interconnectedness and their connections to the neighborhood. In April 1926, the Office of the Public Buildings and Public Parks graded and seeded the circle, which was also being considered as a possible location to relocate the Bartholdi Fountain. Sidewalks were added in 1929.

In 1931, there was some discussion in the local press about moving the General William Tecumseh Sherman Monument from President's Park to Sherman Circle to allow for the widening of E Street NW, but no action to move the monument was ever taken.

During the planning of the Washington Metro in the late 1960s, Sherman Circle was briefly considered as a location for a Petworth stop on a line that would have been routed from Columbia Heights under Kansas Avenue NW en route to Fort Totten.

In 2012, 21 pedestrian lamps were added to the circle.

== See also ==
- List of circles in Washington, D.C.
