= North Portal Estates =

Neighborhood of Washington, D.C.

Coordinates: 38°59′36.6″N 77°2′25.4″W

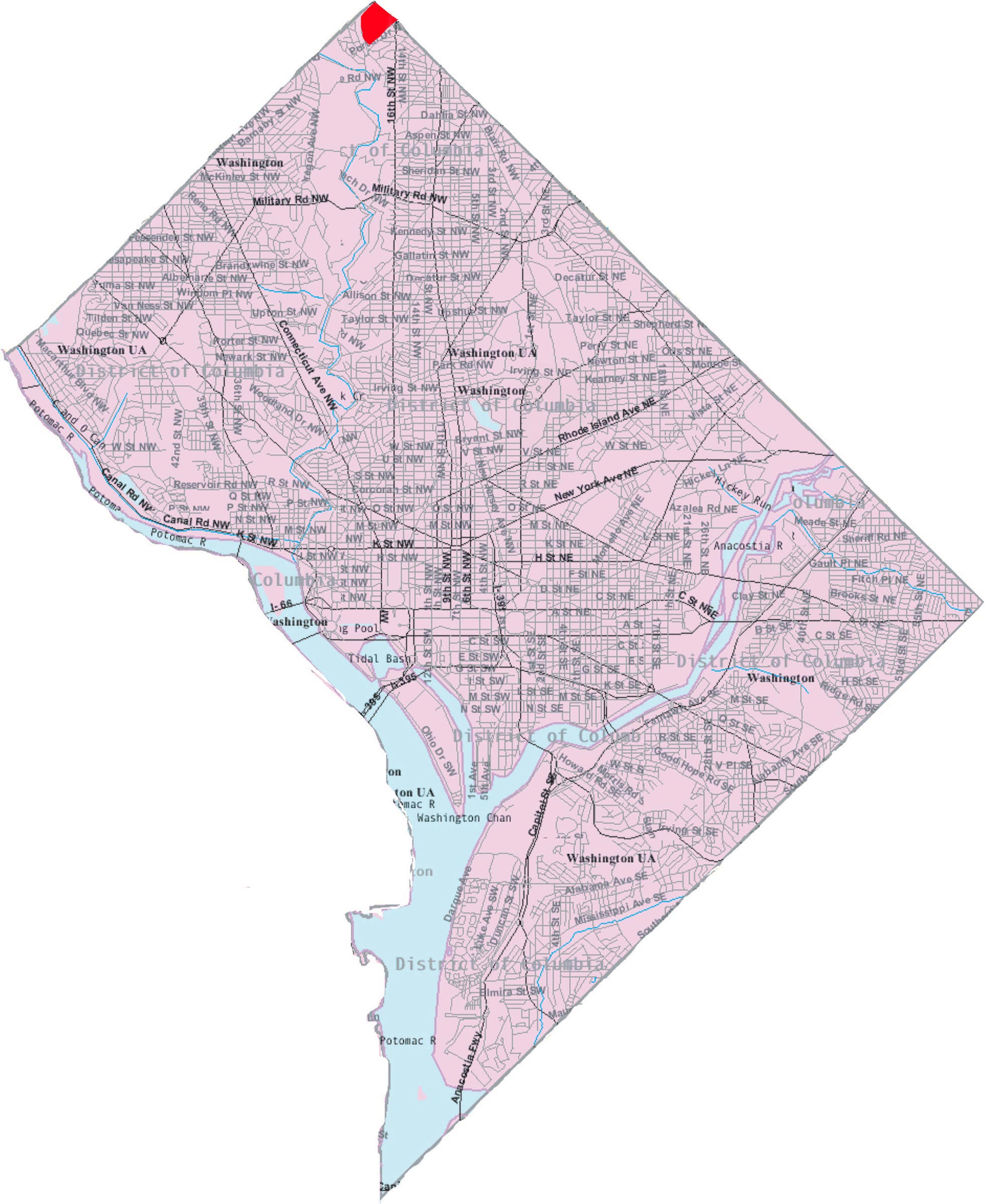
Map of Washington, D.C., with North Portal Estates highlighted in red

North Portal Estates is an affluent residential neighborhood in Washington, D.C. that forms the northernmost corner of the District of Columbia. North Portal Estates is bounded by North Portal Drive to the south, East Beach Drive to the west and northwest, and Rock Creek Park to the northeast. It is not set on any major thoroughfare in the city, although North Portal Drive is accessible via a rotary intersection on 16th Street NW.

Because of its isolation via the park and lack of major streets, the neighborhood is extraordinarily suburban in character, full of winding streets, detached houses on large lots, and open space.

North Portal Estates and the rest of Ward 4 are represented in the Council of the District of Columbia by Janeese Lewis George.

The community was mostly Jewish, in contrast to the nearby Colonial Village, which was a mostly Protestant neighborhood. The community was constructed by wealthy Jewish families in the 1950s and 1960s, following the 1948 Supreme Court decision striking down racially restrictive covenants. The homes in North Portal Estates are larger and more recent than the older homes in Shepherd Park. Racial covenants were prohibited by law by the 1968 Fair Housing Act. African-Americans began moving into North Portal Estates in the late 1960s and early 1970s, comprising two-thirds of the population by the 1980s as the older Jewish population began to move away or die. By the early 1980s, North Portal Estates had become a premier neighborhood for upper-middle-class African-American professionals in Washington, D.C., including doctors, lawyers, business people, clergy, and politicians. While mostly black, the neighborhood is multiracial as some white Jewish families have remained in the neighborhood. By the 2010s, the neighborhood was still predominantly upscale, but had become home to a more socioeconomically and racially mixed population.
