= Cultural Tourism DC =

Washington DC-based tourism organization

- Logo of Cultural Tourism DC
- Merged into: Events DC, 31 October 2022; 4 years ago
- Formation: Kathryn S. Smith, January 1, 1996
- Location: Washington, D.C., United States
- Region served: DC metro area
- Website: www.culturaltourismdc.org

Cultural Tourism DC was an independent non-profit coalition of more than 230 culture, heritage, and community-based organizations in Washington, DC. Cultural Tourism DC and its members develop and present programs in Washington for area residents and visitors. Member organizations represent cultural and community organizations throughout Washington, DC; they include large institutions such as the John F. Kennedy Center for the Performing Arts and U.S. National Arboretum to smaller ones such as the Frederick Douglass House and the Hillwood Estate, Museum & Gardens. In 2022, Events DC acquired Cultural Tourism DC and CTDC wound down its operations as a standalone entity.

== Programs ==
Cultural Tourism DC (CTDC) offered a range of guided and self-guided walking tours of historic neighborhoods in Washington, DC. These Neighborhood Heritage Trails relate the history of DC's communities through poster-sized street signs displaying text, maps, and historic photos. The 1-to-2-mile (1.6 to 3.2 km) walking tours can be navigated with an accompanying free guidebook; a few of the tours also offer an accompanying audio walking tour guide. As of 2018, CTDC had created Heritage Trails for 18 DC neighborhoods, the most recent of which is in Eckington:

- Anacostia
- Adams Morgan
- Barracks Row
- Brightwood
- Columbia Heights
- Greater Deanwood
- Downtown
- Eckington
- Federal Triangle
- Georgia Ave./Pleasant Plains
- Greater H Street NE
- LeDroit Park/Bloomingdale
- Logan Circle
- Mount Pleasant
- Shaw
- Southwest
- Tenleytown
- Greater U Street

Additional heritage trail markers are in other DC neighborhoods as part of the African American Heritage Trail, which highlights more than 200 significant sites from African American history around the city.

Other notable events organized by Cultural Tourism DC included:

- Passport DC, an annual event each May where many of the embassies and international cultural centers in Washington, DC open their doors to showcase their culture, art, music, dance and food. The event features street festivals, open houses, embassy events, special performances and other events, including the annual EU Open House and Around the World Embassy Tour.
- WalkingTown DC and BikingTown DC, a two-week program that features free guided walking and biking tours of neighborhoods across the city. Tour topics include history, architecture, and local development.
- The Embassy Chef Challenge, an annual fundraising benefit featuring international tastings, awards, entertainment, and a silent auction.
- PorchFest, which invites Washington area visitors to celebrate local talent by turning the front stoops of several neighborhood homes and businesses into performance spaces where local musicians play for the community.
