= Lucy Ella Moten =

American educator and doctor (1851–1933)

Lucy Ellen Moten
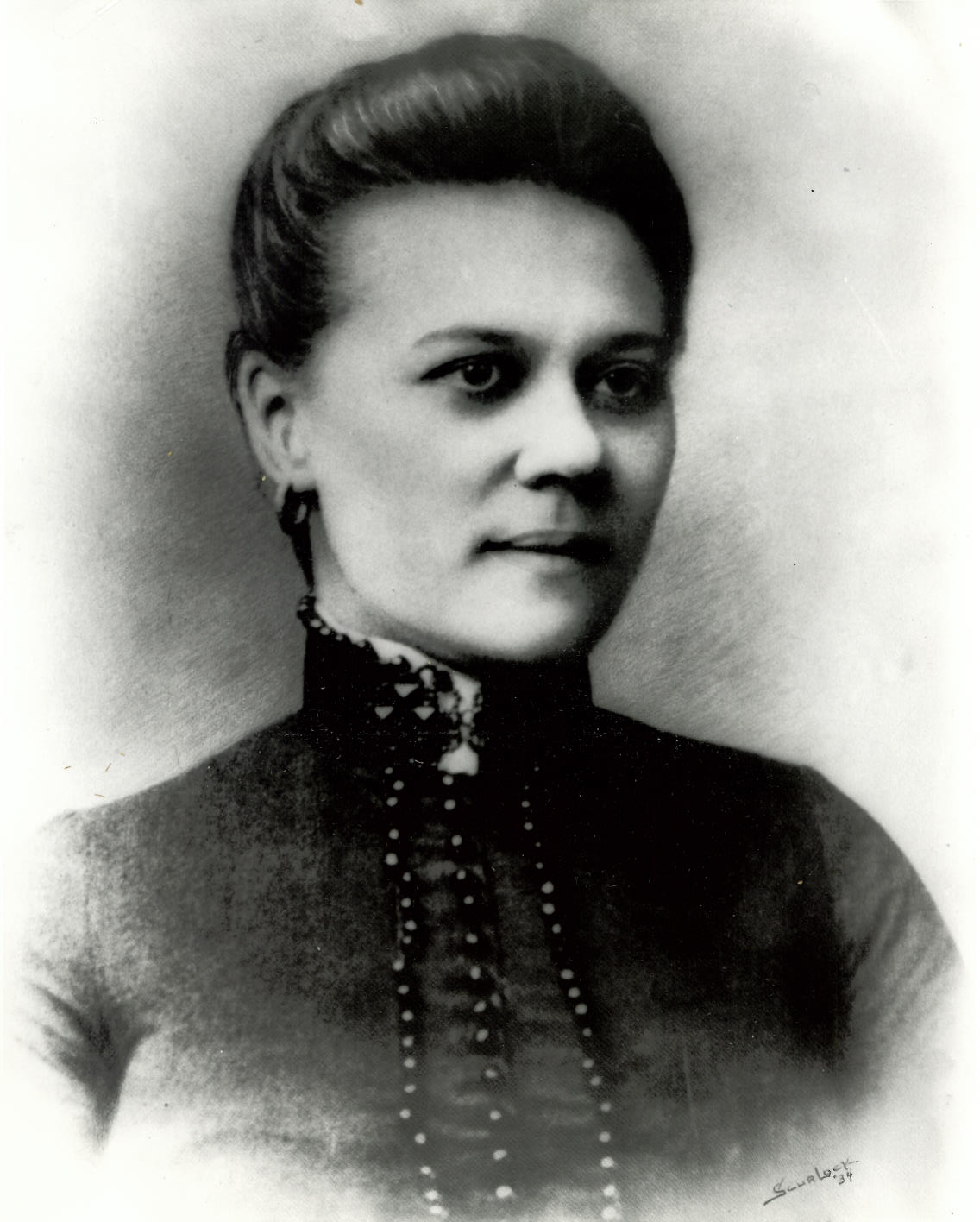
- Dr. Lucy E. Moten
- Born: c. 1851; Fauquier County, Virginia, U.S.
- Died: August 24 1933; New York, New York, U.S.
- Education: State Normal School (Salem, Massachusetts); Howard University
- Occupations: Physician, educator

Lucy Ella Moten (c. 1851 – August 24, 1933) was an American educator and medical doctor. A principal of The Miner School (now known as University of the District of Columbia). From 1883 to 1920, she was responsible for training many of the teachers in Washington, D.C. African-American schools.

== Early life ==
Moten was born a free woman in Fauquier County, Virginia. Her mother, Julija (Withers) Moten, and her father, Benjamin Moten, were free African Americans. Her family moved to Washington D.C. in part to help further her education at tuition and public schools open to African Americans in Washington. Washington's public schools remained segregated until 1954.

== Education ==
Moten attended Howard University for two years and then enrolled at the State Normal School in Salem, Massachusetts, graduating in 1875. In 1883 she graduated from Spencerian Business College. She received an M.D. from the Howard University Medical College in 1897. She studied education at New York University at the graduate level.

== Career ==
Moten returned to teach in the Washington D.C. public schools for African Americans, including the O Street School. In 1883, African-American leader Frederick Douglass recommended her for the post of principal of Miner Normal School, which trained African-American teachers. While heading the Miner School, she decided to enroll at Howard University Medical College so she could better care for her students' health and to create a new course on hygiene. During summer break she often taught classes for other educators in the American South.

== Death and legacy ==
She retired in 1920 and moved to New York City, where she died after being struck by a taxi cab driver in 1933. Moten Elementary School in Washington, D.C. is named for her.
