= LeDroit Park =

Neighborhood of Washington, D.C.

- LeDroit Park Historic District
- U.S. National Register of Historic Places
- U.S. Historic district
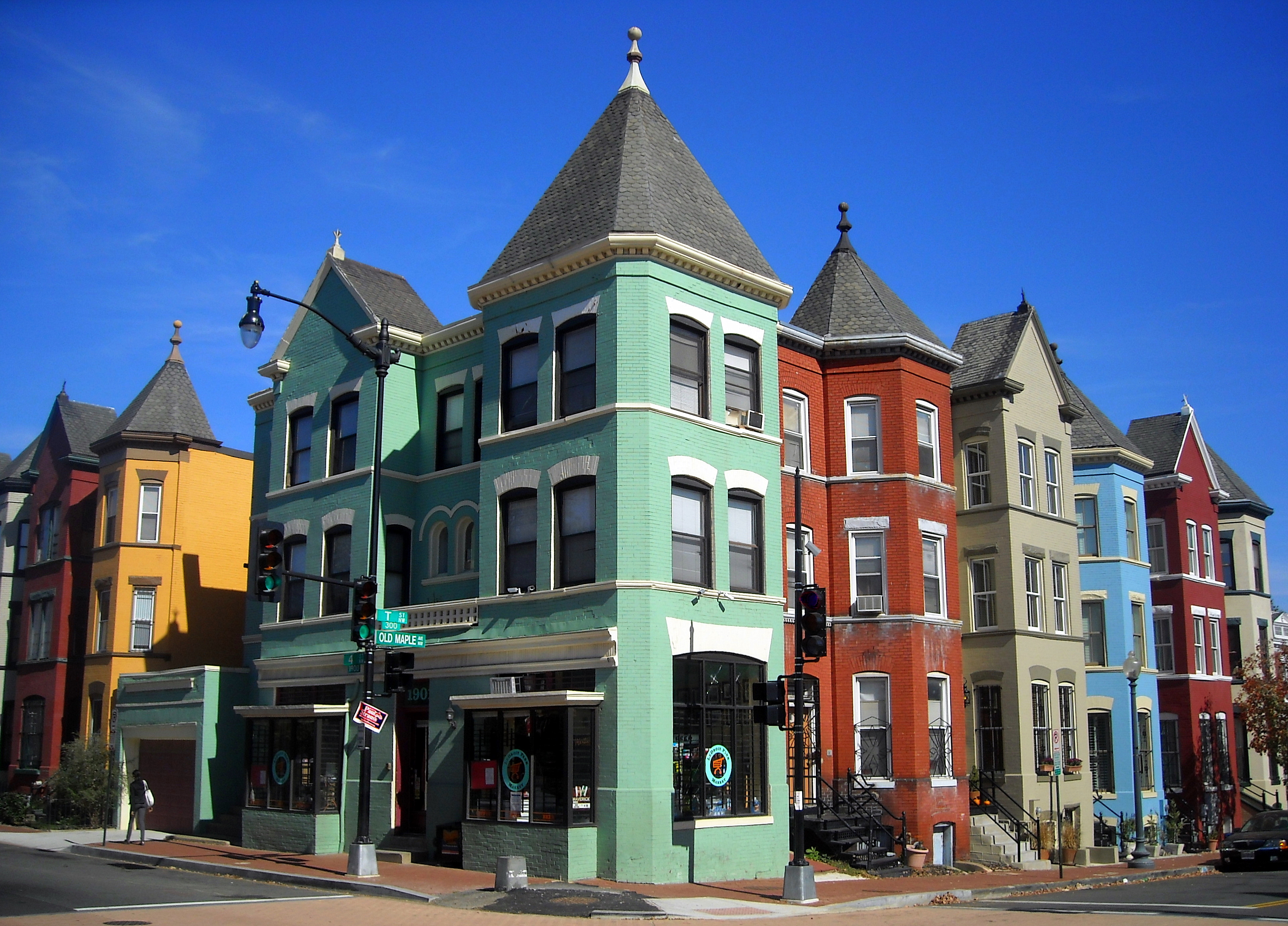
- Intersection of 4th & T Streets, NW in LeDroit Park (2008)

- Location within the District of Columbia Location within the United States

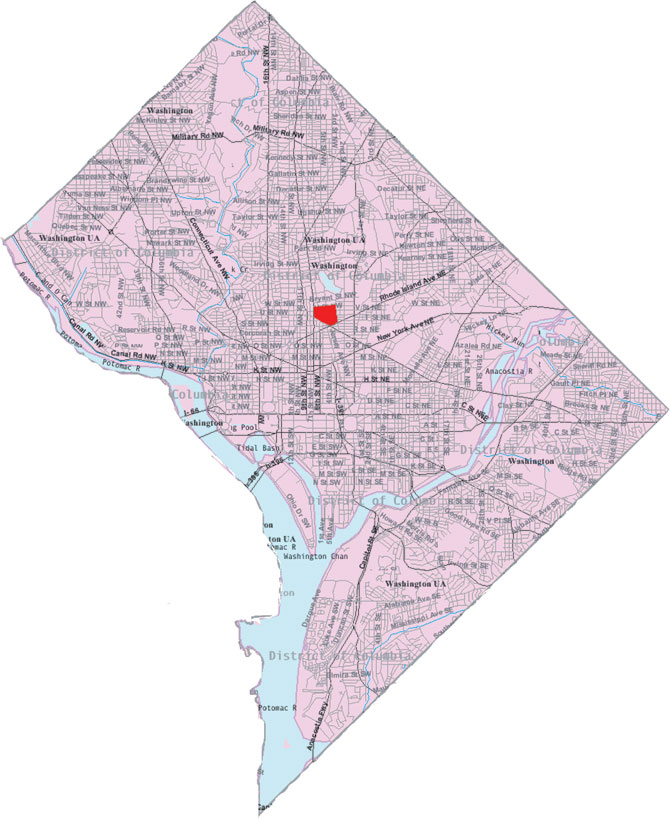
- Map of Washington, D.C., with Le Droit Park highlighted in red
- Location: Bounded roughly by Florida, Georgia, and Rhode Island Avenues, 2nd and Elm Streets, NW, Howard University, Washington, D.C.
- Coordinates: 38°55′8.5872″N 77°1′1.326″W
- Built: 1873; 153 years ago
- NRHP reference No.: 74002165
- Added to NRHP: February 25, 1974

LeDroit Park (/ləˈdrɔɪt/ or /ˈliːdrɔɪt/) is a neighborhood in Washington, D.C. located immediately southeast of Howard University. Its borders include Florida Avenue NW, Bryant Street NW, Georgia Avenue NW, and 2nd Street NW. LeDroit Park is known for its history and 19th century protected architecture. The community's diversity entices new residents to the community, as well as its close proximity to the Shaw–Howard University Metro station and many dining options.

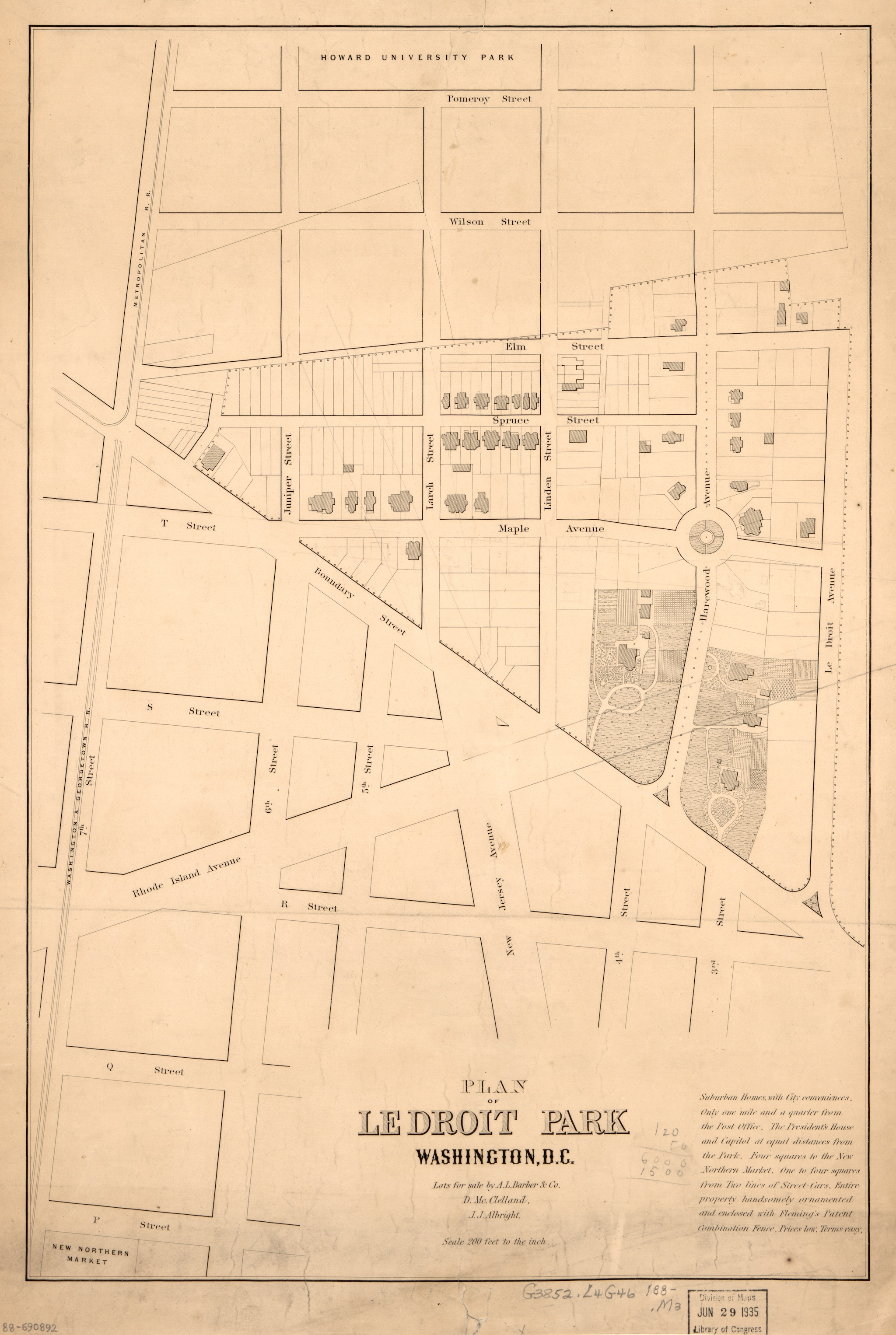
1880 map of LeDroit Park

== History ==
The neighborhood was founded in 1873 by Amzi Barber, a businessman who served on the board of trustees of neighboring Howard University. Barber named the neighborhood after his father-in-law, LeDroict Langdon, but dropped the ⟨c⟩.

As one of the first suburbs of Washington, LeDroit Park was developed and marketed as a "romantic" neighborhood with narrow tree-lined streets that bore the same names as the trees that shaded them, differing from the street names used in the rest of the city. Extensive focus was placed on the landscaping of this neighborhood, as developers spent a large sum of money to plant flower beds and trees to attract high-profile professionals from the city. Originally a whites-only neighborhood, LeDroit Park was even gated with guards to promote security for its residents. Efforts by many, especially multiple actions by students from Howard University, led to the integration of the area. Between 1886 and 1891, what newspapers called a "fence war" between LeDroit Park residents and "intruders" seeking a corridor from Howard Town to downtown unfolded. "With the opening of the streets, the park soon lost its former characteristics and became a part of the city with all its advantages and disadvantages."

By the 1940s, LeDroit Park became a major focal point for the African-American elite as many prominent figures resided there. Griffith Stadium, the home of the Washington Redskins and Washington Senators was also located here until 1965, when the Howard University Hospital was built where it used to stand. Le Droit Park includes Anna J. Cooper Circle, named for the education pioneer.

=== Historic District ===
Today, the neighborhood's historic value is officially recognized as the LeDroit Park Historic District. The historic district includes the Mary Church Terrell House, a U.S. National Historic Landmark. The neighborhood was awarded a place on the National Register of Historic Places in 1974.

=== Heritage Trail ===
On October 17, 2015, the LeDroit Park Heritage Trail was opened by Cultural Tourism DC. Featuring 16 signs, the 90-minute walking tour chronicles the history of the neighborhood and its residents. The Trail begins where Florida Avenue, 6th and T Streets, NW meet at the "gateway" to LeDroit Park.

== Architecture ==
One of LeDroit Park's more recognizable features is its Victorian mansions, houses and row-houses, designed by architect James McGill. None of the original 64 homes McGill designed in LeDroit Park were identical and most were built between 1873 and 1877. Today, 50 of the original homes remain. McGill was also a member of the LeDroit Park Property Owners Association, a precursor to the LeDroit Park Civic Association, which is active today. LeDroit's protected housing stock includes 12 different styles of homes.

== Public spaces and art ==
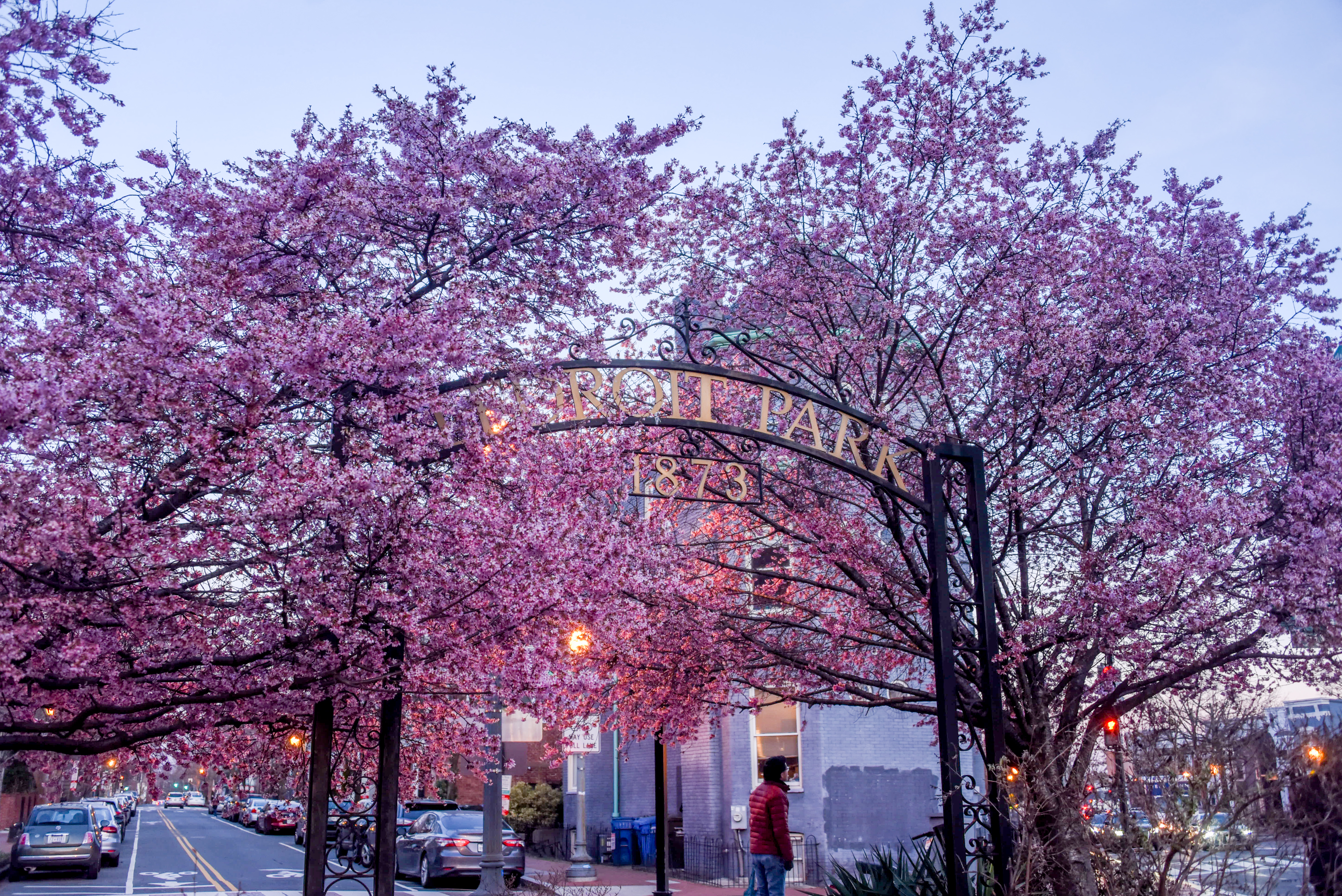
LeDroit Park blooming trees

When the Gage-Eckington School Elementary School closed, residents successfully lobbied the city to tear it down and convert it into a park, which opened in 2011 as The Park at LeDroit. The park houses a large playground, a dog park and the Common Good City Farm, an urban agriculture education center and community garden with 40 plots. In May 2011, His Royal Highness Prince Charles of Wales visited the Common Good City Farm.

Murals are painted on many walls throughout the neighborhood. This Is How We Live was commissioned by the DC Commission on the Arts & Humanities to be painted by artist Garin Baker. The mural shows the African-American heritage of the neighborhood, the changing community and landscape and historical and architectural scenes from the past and present. At the dedication on December 13, 2008, Mayor Adrian M. Fenty is quoted as describing the mural as serving to

... visually engage residents through a beautiful neighborhood mural that depicts the unique landscapes, people and images of the historic LeDroit Park community. The mural will become a prominent landmark in the neighborhood for years to come.

== Notable residents ==
External videos
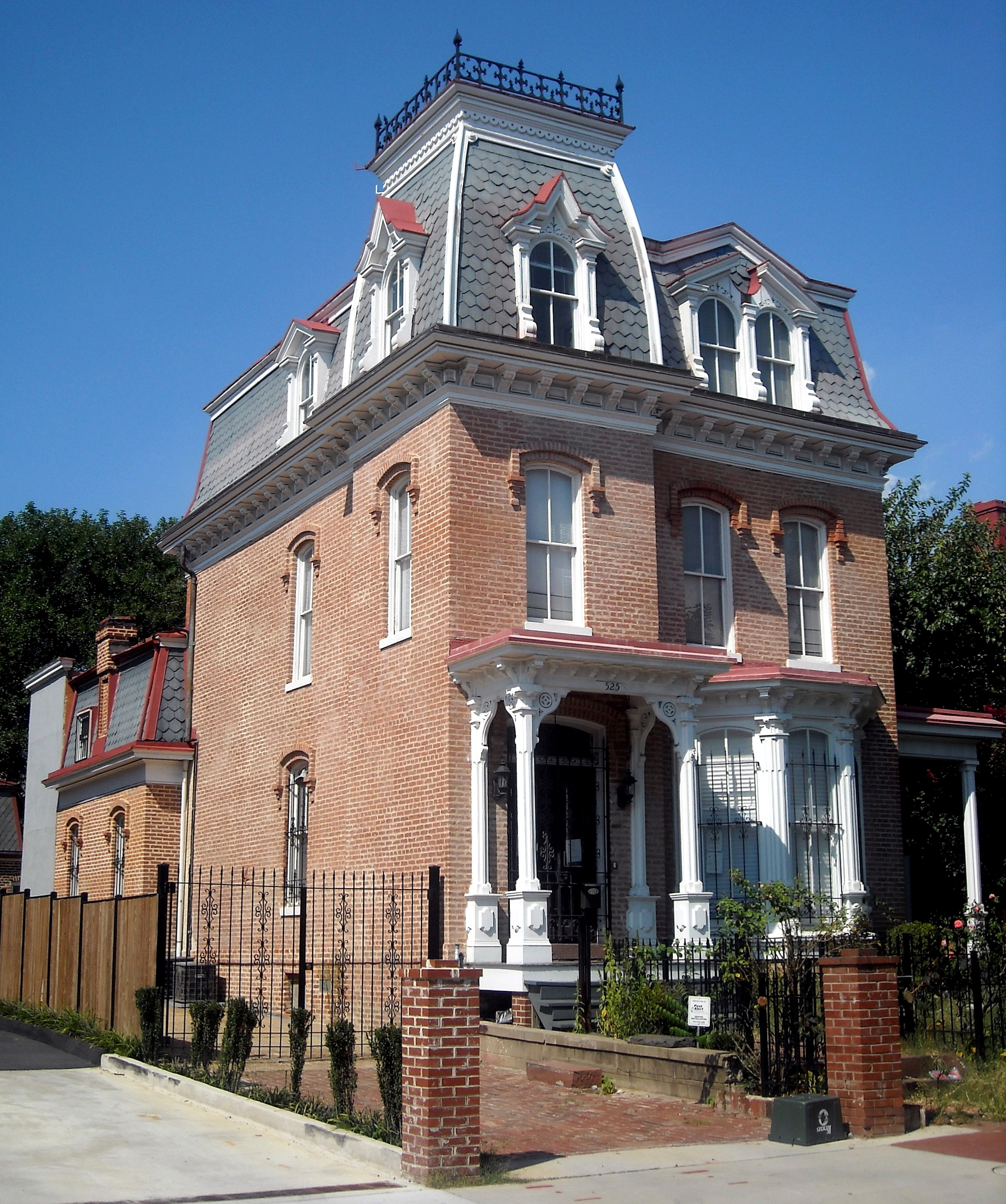
- WETA Neighborhoods, Ledroit Park, WETA-TV
- LeDroit Park, Washington, D.C., National Building Museum

- General William Birney – Civil War veteran owned the stately mansion on Anna J. Cooper Circle. (T & Second Street)
- Senator Edward Brooke – First African-American to win the senate seat by popular vote, was born in this house in 1919. (1938 Third Street)
- Dr. Ralph J. Bunche – The first African-American to receive the Nobel Peace prize, for his mediation in Palestine; resided in LeDroit Park during his professorship at Howard University. — (No address found)
- General Benjamin O. Davis Sr. – The first African-American general. Father of Benjamin O. Davis Jr.; commander of the World War II Tuskegee airmen. (No address found)
- Hon. Oscar De Priest – First Black congressmen after reconstruction, lived here for his three terms in office. (419 U Street)
- Paul Laurence Dunbar – Black poet laureate and Howard University alumnus. (321 U Street)
- Duke Ellington – jazz legend, lived in the neighborhood with his family during his early childhood. (420 Elm Street)
- Major Christian Fleetwood – One of the first Blacks to be awarded the Medal of Honor. (319 U Street)
- Julia West Hamilton – Civic leader and member of N.A.C.W. (320 U Street)
- Rev. Jesse Jackson – Civil rights activist and founder of the Rainbow/PUSH Coalition. (Corner of Fourth & T Streets)
- Ernest Everett Just – Professor in biology, researcher in biogenetics with significant contributions to zoology and biogenetics. (412 T Street)
- Dr. Jesse Lawson and Dr. Anna J. Cooper – Both prominent educators who founded Frelinghuysen University to educate Blacks working-class adults. Lawson also was a Lawyer (Howard University Law, 1881) who advocated for the rights of poor D.C. residents. (201 T Street)
- Mary Church Terrell – Heiress and activist for civil rights and woman's suffrage. (326 T Street, National Historic Landmark)
- Walter Washington – the first mayor of DC elected under home rule. (408 T Street)
- Clarence Cameron White – A prominent ]educator in fine arts and Howard alumni (No address found)
- Dr. Garnet C. Wilkinson – Superintendent of Colored Schools during segregation. (406 U Street)
- John W. Garland – Former president of Central State University in Wilberforce, Ohio. (near the corner of 6th and U Streets)
