= Geography of Washington, D.C. =

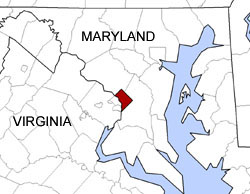
Map showing the location of Washington, D.C. in relation to its bordering states of Maryland and Virginia

Washington, D.C. is located in the Mid-Atlantic region of the United States at 38°53′42″N 77°02′11″W, the coordinates of the Zero Milestone, on The Ellipse. According to the United States Census Bureau, the city has a geographical area of 68.3 square miles (176.9 km^{2}), 61.4 square miles (159.0 km^{2}) of which is land, and the remaining 6.9 square miles (17.9 km^{2}) (10.16%) of which is water. The Anacostia River and the smaller Rock Creek flow into the Potomac River in Washington.

Washington, D.C. is surrounded by Northern Virginia on its southwest side and Maryland on its southeast, northeast, and northwest sides; it interrupts those states' shared border, which is the south shore of the Potomac River both upstream and downstream from the city. The portion of the Potomac River that passes Washington, D.C. is virtually entirely within the city's border, as Washington, D.C. extends to the south bank. The city contains the remaining federal district, which was formerly part of those two adjacent states before they respectively ceded it for the national capital in the 1790s. The land ceded from Virginia was returned by Congress in 1847, so what remains of the modern District was all once part of Maryland.

== Topography and geology ==
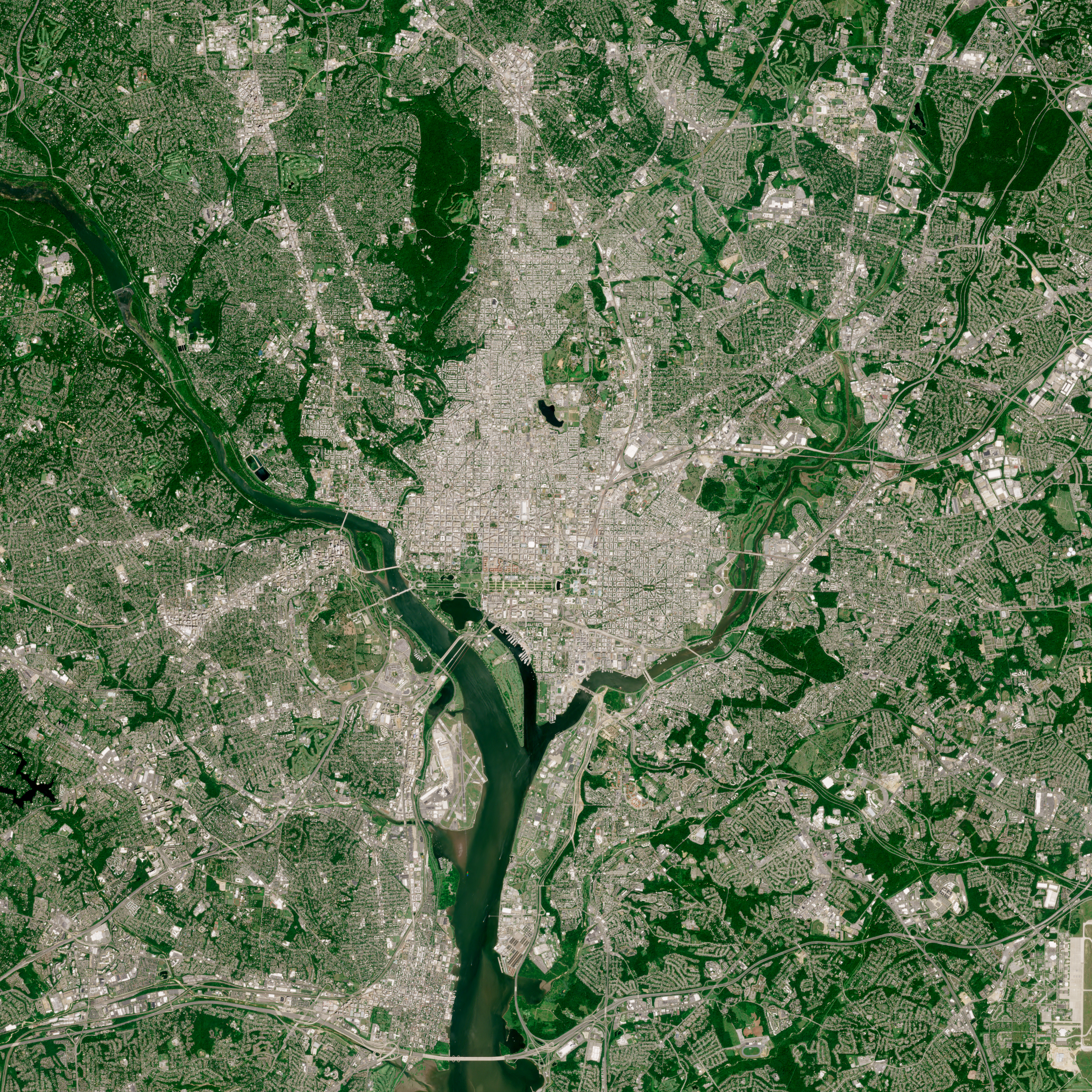
Washington, D.C. as seen from space in 2020

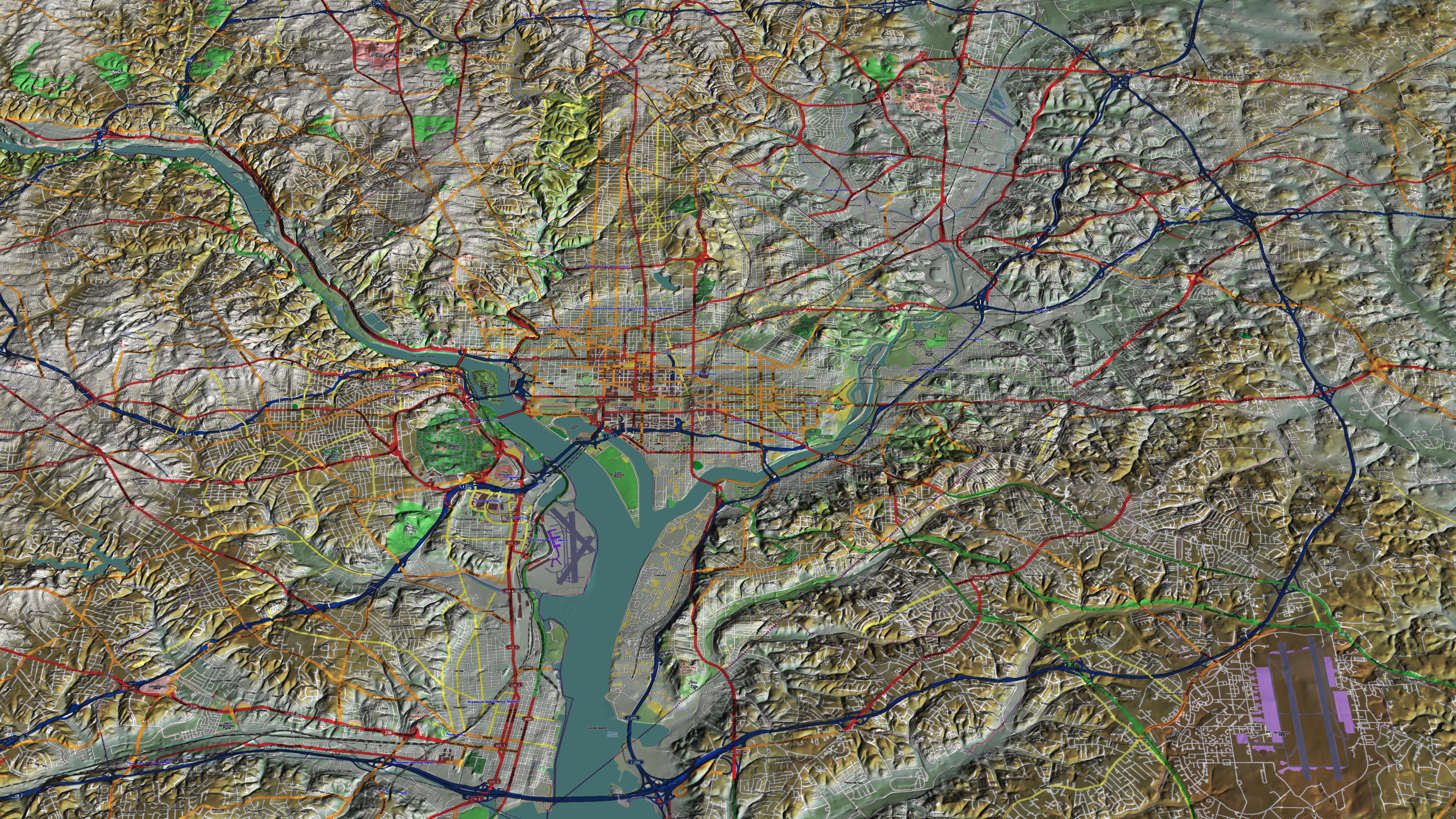
Aerial view, 3D computer generated image of Washington, D.C.

The topography of Washington, D.C. is highly similar to the physical geography of much of Maryland. The city has three significant natural flowing bodies of water: the Potomac River and two tributaries, the Anacostia River and Rock Creek. The confluence of the Potomac and Anacostia forms the historic peninsula known as Arsenal Point. The District also includes the Washington Channel, which flows into the junction of the Anacostia and Potomac rivers. There are also three artificial reservoirs: Dalecarlia Reservoir, which crosses over the northwest border of the District from Maryland, McMillan Reservoir near Howard University, and Georgetown Reservoir upstream of Georgetown. A fourth, minor reservoir is at Fort Reno in Tenleytown.

Washington, D.C. is situated in a topographic bowl. The bottom of the bowl, where the White House and United States Capitol are located, is in the floodplain of the junction of the Anacostia and Potomac Rivers. Extending out from the floodplain is a series of rising river terraces. These high ridges nearly surround the city. The highest of these terraces is 200 feet above sea level and is fronted by an escarpment that is very prominent along the east side of the Anacostia River. Steep-sided ravines and small streams cut through the upper terrace east of the Anacostia River at frequent intervals. Examples of these stream valleys can be found at Forts Dupont and Stanton.

Washington, D.C. is located on the fall line, the border of two considerably different geological terrains or provinces; the hard rock of the Piedmont Plateau to the north and west and the soft sediments of the Atlantic Coastal Plain to the east. The Piedmont Plateau is located north and west of the city. Deeply cut valleys and prominent ridges characterize this area.

The highest point in Washington, D.C. is 410 feet (125 m) above sea level at Reno Reservoir in Tenleytown. The lowest point is sea level, which occurs along all of the Anacostia shore and all of the Potomac shore except the uppermost 100 meters (the Little Falls-Chain Bridge area). The sea level in the Tidal Basin rose eleven feet during Hurricane Isabel on September 18, 2003. The geographic center of Washington, D.C. is on the site of the Organization of American States headquarters. The U.S. Capitol marks the intersection of the city's four administrative quadrants.

Other prominent geographical features of Washington, D.C., include Theodore Roosevelt Island, Columbia Island, the Three Sisters, and Hains Point.

Some areas, especially around the National Mall and parts of Foggy Bottom, were marshes or parts of the river that have been filled in.

=== Natural history ===
During the 18th century, significant portions of the region were forested, with species including rabbits, turkey, pheasants, woodcocks, turtles, and quail, as well as numerous bird species including mockingbirds, bluebirds, hummingbirds, and orioles. Other indigenous species include black snake, garter snake, rattlesnake, copperhead, bullfrog and other types of frogs, ground squirrels, flying squirrels, skunks, opossums, raccoons, foxes, beavers, deer, wolves, and bears. Snipes and various types of ducks inhabited swampy areas, as well as soruses.

Native tree species include willow, birch, cedar, and oak. Other plant species found along the Potomac during the early 19th century include yellow jessamine, prickly pear cactus, white horehound, sweet fennel, wild cherries, and wild strawberries. The large percentage of parkland contributes to a high urban tree canopy coverage of 35%.

In 1965, President Lyndon Johnson called the Potomac River a "national disgrace" and used the river to illustrate the need for the Clean Water Restoration Act of 1966. The river is now home to a vibrant warm-water fishery and naturally reproducing bald eagles have returned to its banks. Despite its intensely urbanized landscape, the District of Columbia is a center for research on urban wildlife management, invasive species management, urban stream restoration, and the aquatic ecology of urban streams. The National Park Service's Center For Urban Ecology is a regional source of expertise and applied science for the region.

=== Earthquakes ===
Earthquake activity in the District of Columbia is low. No earthquakes have been centered within the District, nor are there any faults. However, it has felt earthquakes centered in Virginia, Maryland, and other surrounding states and large earthquakes in Canada and New England.

The District felt the 1811–1812 New Madrid earthquakes, and according to old records, residents were "badly frightened". In March 1828, President John Quincy Adams felt a "violent" earthquake in the White House and wrote it in his journal. The 1886 Charleston earthquake (magnitude 6.6 to 7.3) was felt in DC. The strongest earthquake in Virginia, the 1897 Giles County earthquake, was felt in the District. An earthquake in 1925 in Canada, estimated about magnitude 7, was felt over 2 million square miles (5.18 million km^{2}). Another 6.2 earthquake in 1935 caused damage in New York and shook residents from Maine to Wisconsin.

The 2011 Virginia earthquake was felt in Washington and caused damage to landmarks and monuments such as the Washington Monument and the Washington National Cathedral.

== Climate ==
Washington, DC

Climate chart (precipitation, max. and min. temperature)
J	F	M	A	M	J	J	A	S	O	N	D
2.8 43 29	2.6 47 31	3.5 56 38	3.1 67 47	4 75 57	3.8 84 66	3.7 88 71	2.9 87 70	3.7 80 62	3.4 68 51	3.2 58 41	3.1 47 33
- █ Average max. and min. temperatures in °F
- █ Precipitation totals in inches
- Source: NOAA
Metric conversion
J	F	M	A	M	J	J	A	S	O	N	D
71 6 −2	67 8 −1	88 13 3	78 19 8	101 24 14	96 29 19	95 31 22	74 30 21	94 26 17	86 20 10	81 14 5	77 8 0
- █ Average max. and min. temperatures in °C
- █ Precipitation totals in mm

Washington, D.C., is located in the humid subtropical climate zone (Köppen climate classification: Cfa), exhibiting four distinct seasons. Its climate is typical of the mid-Atlantic states. The District is located in USDA plant hardiness zone 8a near downtown, and zone 7b elsewhere in the city, indicating a temperate climate. As implied in the previous sentence, the downtown area exhibits an urban heat island (UHI) build-up that can especially exacerbate the sultriness of summer nights.

- Winter sees generally cold temperatures, and the daily average temperature in January is 37.5 °F (3.1 °C). Rarely lows will be into the teens °F (−7 °C or below), and temperatures below 10 °F (−12 °C) are rare, and the last 0 °F (−18 °C)-or-colder reading at Reagan National occurred on January 19, 1994. In terms of highs, January alone sees 50 °F (10 °C)+ highs on 8.6 days, while 9 days per season stay at or below freezing.
- Spring is typically dry, sunny, and begins in March. At Reagan National, the last freeze on average occurs on March 27. Due to the rapid warming, pollen is also problematic during this time of year. Serious heat and humidity begin in late April to early May, although a drier heat is possible earlier. The first 90 °F (32 °C)+ high of the year on average falls on May 17.
- Summer is hot and humid, with July averaging 79.8 °F (26.6 °C). Nighttime conditions stay warm and are often humid, falling into the low 70s °F (21–23 °C). Dew points average from 62.4 to 66.3 °F (16.9 to 19.1 °C) from June to August as well, indicating moderate discomfort. There are more than 35 days of 90 °F (32 °C) or higher temperatures, yet 100 °F (38 °C) temperatures do not occur every year. In recent years, due partly to increased UHI build-up, daily minima of 80 °F (27 °C) have become evermore common.
- Autumn is similar to spring in temperature, with crisp mornings, and is a reasonably long transition, with the last 90 °F (32 °C)+ high of the year on average falling on September 10, and the first freeze at Reagan National occurring on November 18.
- Precipitation is generous and well-distributed throughout the year (though February is noticeably drier), falling on 8 to 11 days per month, averaging 39.74 in (1,009 mm). Annual precipitation has ranged from 21.66 to 66.28 in (550 to 1,684 mm) in 1930 and 2018, respectively. The wettest month on record was September 1934, with 17.45 in (443 mm) of rain, while the driest month was October 1963 with trace amounts. The most rain in a calendar day was 6.39 in (162 mm) on August 23, 1933.
- Snowfall falls mostly in small accumulations, totaling an average 15.4 inches (39.1 cm) per season, occurring mostly in January and February, with some accumulation in December and March, but rarely November or April; on average there are 12.1 days per season with a snow depth of 1 in (2.5 cm) or more. The strongest wintertime storms are usually "nor'easters", which typically feature high winds and heavy rains, occasionally in the form of a 'blizzard', while Alberta clippers are generally fast-moving and bring accumulations of under 4 in (10 cm). The Knickerbocker Storm produced both the heaviest fall in a single storm, at 28 in (71 cm) and also the greatest 24-hour total of 21 in (53 cm); with an aggregate 56.1 in (142 cm), the snowiest season was 2009–10; the most snow in one month was 35.2 in (89 cm) in February 1899. The seasons with the least snow were 1972–73 and 1997–98 at 0.1 in (0.25 cm) each. The earliest and latest dates for measurable (≥0.1 in or 0.25 cm) snowfall are October 10, 1979, and April 28, 1898, respectively. The suburbs to the north and west, due to a variety of factors (including inland location, elevation, and reduced UHI), typically receive more snowfall, with seasonal averages generally above 19 in (48 cm). Freezing rain is also possible during the winter months; the location of the warm waters of the Gulf Stream to the east often causes the rain-snow line to be located in the region, and ice storms are more likely in January and February.
- During late summer and early fall, hurricanes, or their remnants, occasionally track through the area. However, they have often weakened when doing so, partly due to the city's inland location. Flooding of the Potomac River, however, caused by a combination of high tide, storm surge, and runoff, has been known to cause extensive property damage in Georgetown.
- Sunshine is adequate, totaling 2,529 hours per year. However, bright sunshine is more likely to occur less than 50% of the time from November through February.
- Temperature extremes are as follows:

The highest recorded temperature was 106 °F (41 °C) on July 20, 1930, and August 6, 1918, while the lowest recorded temperature was −15 °F (−26 °C) on February 11, 1899, right before the Great Blizzard of 1899. The extreme low daily high temperature was 4 °F (−16 °C), occurring one day before the all-time minimum, while the extreme high daily low temperature was 84 °F (29 °C) on July 23–24, 2011 and July 16, 1983. Monthly mean temperatures have ranged from 23.7 °F (−4.6 °C) in January 1918 to 84.5 °F (29.2 °C) in July 2011, while the corresponding range for the annual mean is 52.2 °F (11.2 °C) in 1904 to 61.5 °F (16.4 °C) in 2012. (Note: The latter figure bested the previous record-holder, 1991, by 1.3 °F (0.7 °C), a very wide margin over a year.)

=== Monthly statistics ===
Climate data for Washington, D.C. (Reagan National Airport), 1991−2020 normals, (Note: Mean monthly maxima and minima (i.e. the expected highest and lowest temperature readings at any point during the year or given month) calculated based on data at said location from 1991 to 2020.) extremes 1872−present (Note: Official records for Washington, D.C. were kept at 24th and M Streets NW from January 1872 to June 1945, and at Reagan National Airport since July 1945.)
Month	Jan	Feb	Mar	Apr	May	Jun	Jul	Aug	Sep	Oct	Nov	Dec	Year
Record high °F (°C)	79 (26)	84 (29)	93 (34)	95 (35)	99 (37)	104 (40)	106 (41)	106 (41)	104 (40)	98 (37)	86 (30)	79 (26)	106 (41)
Mean maximum °F (°C)	66.7 (19.3)	68.1 (20.1)	77.3 (25.2)	86.4 (30.2)	91.0 (32.8)	95.7 (35.4)	98.1 (36.7)	96.5 (35.8)	91.9 (33.3)	84.5 (29.2)	74.8 (23.8)	67.1 (19.5)	99.1 (37.3)
Mean daily maximum °F (°C)	44.8 (7.1)	48.3 (9.1)	56.5 (13.6)	68.0 (20.0)	76.5 (24.7)	85.1 (29.5)	89.6 (32.0)	87.8 (31.0)	80.7 (27.1)	69.4 (20.8)	58.2 (14.6)	48.8 (9.3)	67.8 (19.9)
Daily mean °F (°C)	37.5 (3.1)	40.0 (4.4)	47.6 (8.7)	58.2 (14.6)	67.2 (19.6)	76.3 (24.6)	81.0 (27.2)	79.4 (26.3)	72.4 (22.4)	60.8 (16.0)	49.9 (9.9)	41.7 (5.4)	59.3 (15.2)
Mean daily minimum °F (°C)	30.1 (−1.1)	31.8 (−0.1)	38.6 (3.7)	48.4 (9.1)	58.0 (14.4)	67.5 (19.7)	72.4 (22.4)	71.0 (21.7)	64.1 (17.8)	52.2 (11.2)	41.6 (5.3)	34.5 (1.4)	50.9 (10.5)
Mean minimum °F (°C)	14.3 (−9.8)	16.9 (−8.4)	23.4 (−4.8)	34.9 (1.6)	45.5 (7.5)	55.7 (13.2)	63.8 (17.7)	62.1 (16.7)	51.3 (10.7)	38.7 (3.7)	28.8 (−1.8)	21.3 (−5.9)	12.3 (−10.9)
Record low °F (°C)	−14 (−26)	−15 (−26)	4 (−16)	15 (−9)	33 (1)	43 (6)	52 (11)	49 (9)	36 (2)	26 (−3)	11 (−12)	−13 (−25)	−15 (−26)
Average precipitation inches (mm)	2.86 (73)	2.62 (67)	3.50 (89)	3.21 (82)	3.94 (100)	4.20 (107)	4.33 (110)	3.25 (83)	3.93 (100)	3.66 (93)	2.91 (74)	3.41 (87)	41.82 (1,062)
Average snowfall inches (cm)	4.9 (12)	5.0 (13)	2.0 (5.1)	0.0 (0.0)	0.0 (0.0)	0.0 (0.0)	0.0 (0.0)	0.0 (0.0)	0.0 (0.0)	0.0 (0.0)	0.1 (0.25)	1.7 (4.3)	13.7 (35)
Average precipitation days (≥ 0.01 in)	9.7	9.3	11.0	10.8	11.6	10.6	10.5	8.7	8.7	8.3	8.4	10.1	117.7
Average snowy days (≥ 0.1 in)	2.8	2.7	1.1	0.0	0.0	0.0	0.0	0.0	0.0	0.0	0.1	1.3	8.0
Average relative humidity (%)	62.1	60.5	58.6	58.0	64.5	65.8	66.9	69.3	69.7	67.4	64.7	64.1	64.3
Average dew point °F (°C)	21.7 (−5.7)	23.5 (−4.7)	31.3 (−0.4)	39.7 (4.3)	52.3 (11.3)	61.5 (16.4)	66.0 (18.9)	65.8 (18.8)	59.5 (15.3)	47.5 (8.6)	37.0 (2.8)	27.1 (−2.7)	44.4 (6.9)
Mean monthly sunshine hours	144.6	151.8	204.0	228.2	260.5	283.2	280.5	263.1	225.0	203.6	150.2	133.0	2,527.7
Percentage possible sunshine	48	50	55	57	59	64	62	62	60	59	50	45	57
Average ultraviolet index	2	3	5	7	8	9	9	8	7	4	3	2	6
Source 1: NOAA (relative humidity, dew point and sun 1961−1990)
Source 2: Weather Atlas (UV)

Climate data for Washington, D.C. (Reagan National, 1945-07-01–present)
Month	Jan	Feb	Mar	Apr	May	Jun	Jul	Aug	Sep	Oct	Nov	Dec	Year
Record high °F (°C)	79 (26)	82 (28)	89 (32)	95 (35)	99 (37)	104 (40)	105 (41)	105 (41)	101 (38)	98 (37)	86 (30)	79 (26)	105 (41)
Record low °F (°C)	−5 (−21)	4 (−16)	14 (−10)	24 (−4)	34 (1)	47 (8)	54 (12)	49 (9)	39 (4)	29 (−2)	16 (−9)	3 (−16)	−5 (−21)
Source: NOAA

See or edit raw graph data.

== City plan ==
L'Enfant's plan for Washington, D.C., later revised by Andrew Ellicott in 1792

Washington, D.C. was created to serve as the national capital from its inception. The Residence Act of 1790 required that the capital's territory would be located along the Potomac River within an area that Maryland and Virginia would cede to the federal government. However, it permitted the nation's first president, George Washington, to select the territory's precise location. President Washington then chose for the territory a square whose sides were 10 miles (16 km) in length and whose corners were directly north, east, south, and west of its center. The area of the square contained the existing towns of Georgetown and Alexandria, as well as two small villages, Hamburgh in the Foggy Bottom area and Carrollsburg near the confluence of the Potomac and Anacostia rivers.

The Residence Act had granted the president the authority to locate the federal capital's territory only as far south and east as the mouth of the Anacostia River in Maryland. However, President Washington wanted to expand the territory's area southward so that its boundaries could encompass the town of Alexandria. In 1791, Congress amended the Residence Act to approve President Washington's selected site, which included the portion of the territory that Virginia would cede.

The location of the capital had many natural advantages: the Potomac was navigable up to the territory, allowing for boat traffic; the established ports at Alexandria and Georgetown could provide an important economic base for a major city; and the territory's inland location was close to the Northwest Territory. During 1791–1792, Andrew Ellicott and several assistants, including Benjamin Banneker, surveyed the boundary between the federal territory and the states of Virginia and Maryland, placing marker stones at every mile point. Many of the stones are still standing.

A new federal city, named in 1791 as the City of Washington in the Territory of Columbia, was then laid out in a largely undeveloped area at the center of the 100 square-mile federal territory. This city, which Pierre (Peter) L'Enfant designed, was bounded to the north by Boundary Street (now Florida Avenue) at the base of the escarpment of the Atlantic Seaboard Fall Line, to the southeast by the Anacostia River, to the southwest by the Potomac River and to the west by Rock Creek. Although L'Enfant designed the city's original layout in 1791, surveyor Andrew Ellicott revised it in 1792 (see Streets and highways of Washington, D.C.). The remainder of the territory was designated as Washington County (on the Maryland side of the Potomac) and Alexandria County (on the Virginia side).

=== Alexandria ===
The land from Virginia was eventually returned to the state in 1846, effective 1847. This land in Virginia makes up the modern area of Arlington County and the old part of Alexandria, Virginia, both of which are Washington, D.C. suburbs. Arlington National Cemetery and The Pentagon are both located in Arlington, though the Pentagon has a Washington DC mailing address. Between 1790 and 1846, Alexandria was referred to as Alexandria, D.C.

=== Georgetown ===
Georgetown was originally part of Maryland and was the only significant population in the area that would become part of Washington, D.C. when the federal city was first created but which remained an independent city then referred to as Georgetown, D.C., until 1871 when it was merged with Washington City and Washington County, completing the process of Washington and the District of Columbia occupying the same geographic borders.

=== McMillan plan ===
The monumental core of the city includes the National Mall and many key federal buildings, monuments, and museums, including the Lincoln Memorial, Washington Monument, and the National Air and Space Museum. Its layout is based on that proposed by the McMillan Commission report in 1901.

== Building heights ==
To preserve the grandeur of the National Mall, the White House, the Capitol, and various other key locations, the entire city is subject to strict building height limits. This limitation was placed in effect just before the 20th century when government officials realized that structural steel "skyscrapers" could overwhelm the city. In 1899, Congress enacted a height limit for the District prohibiting private buildings from rising more than 130 feet. Contrary to popular belief, no law has ever restricted buildings to the height of the United States Capitol or Washington Monument.

A revised height law in 1910 did away with that fixed maximum. The newer legislation, still in effect today, states that no new building may be more than 20 feet taller than the width of the street in front of it. The current law is codified as D.C. CODE ANN. § 6-601.05. Thus, Washington has a relatively modest skyline in comparison to the majority of American cities. However, the District is ringed by high-rise buildings in many nearby suburbs like Arlington, Silver Spring, and Bethesda.

== Neighborhoods ==
Washington, D.C. is divided into eight wards and 37 Advisory Neighborhood Commissions (ANCs) within these wards. The total number of named neighborhoods is 127. The ANCs serve to advise the Washington, D.C. city council on neighborhood matters. The council is required by law to give their opinions great weight, though what that means is up to the Council to decide. Since 2000, the demographics of many neighborhoods have changed markedly.

== Adjacent communities ==
The District of Columbia is bordered by various cities, towns, villages, and unincorporated CDPs in Maryland and Virginia. Following is a list of those adjacent communities.

- Bethesda, Maryland
- Brookmont, Maryland
- Capitol Heights, Maryland
- Chevy Chase (CDP), Maryland
- Chevy Chase Village, Maryland
- Chillum, Maryland
- Colmar Manor, Maryland
- Coral Hills, Maryland
- Cottage City, Maryland
- Fairmount Heights, Maryland
- Glassmanor, Maryland
- Hillcrest Heights, Maryland
- Mount Rainier, Maryland
- Seat Pleasant, Maryland
- Silver Hill, Maryland
- Silver Spring, Maryland
- Suitland, Maryland
- Takoma Park, Maryland
- Alexandria, Virginia
- Arlington, Virginia
- McLean, Virginia (touches Washington, D.C., at one corner only)

In addition to the places named above, there are other small unincorporated parts of Prince George's County, Maryland, which also border Washington, D.C.

== See also ==
- List of circles in Washington, D.C.
- Streets and highways of Washington, D.C.
- Quadrants of Washington, D.C.
- Tiber Creek
