= American League of Colored Laborers =

Former labor union of the United States

- Formation: June 13, 1850
- Type: Labor union
- Headquarters: New York City, New York, United States
- President: Samuel Ringgold Ward
- Vice President: Frederick Douglass; Lewis Woodson
- Secretary: Henry Bibb
- Main organ: Executive committee

The American League of Colored Laborers (ALCL) was a short-lived labor union established in New York City in 1850. It is notable for being the first union created for African Americans in the United States. Social reformer Frederick Douglass assisted in organizing the group, which held its first meeting at the Mother African Methodist Episcopal Zion Church on June 13, 1850. Its initial officers included Samuel Ringgold Ward as president, Douglass and Lewis Woodson as vice presidents, and Henry Bibb as secretary. During the first meeting, an executive committee was organized that was composed of several notable social reformers and abolitionists. In addition to union activities, the league was also envisioned to serve as a benefit society for black tradespeople and entrepreneurs, and to this effect, its leaders planned to establish a mutual savings bank and hold an industrial fair. Despite these plans, the union faltered shortly after its creation, and it would take until 1869 that the first successful national labor union for African Americans, the Colored National Labor Union, was formed.

== History ==
=== Background ===
In the pre-Civil War era, many free black workers in the United States faced economic competition from both native-born white Americans and European immigrants, including Irish Americans. Additionally, African Americans were barred access to many labor unions, which only admitted white members. As a result of this, many African Americans formed mutual organizations and benevolent societies in order to assist each other economically. Examples of these organizations include the Coachman's Benevolent Society (established 1825) and the Humane Mechanics (1828) in Philadelphia, the Baltimore Caulker's Association (1838) in Baltimore, and the Colored Sailor's Home (1839) in New York City. According to historian Gerald D. Jaynes in the Encyclopedia of African American Society, these organizations can be considered "forerunners" or "predecessors" to labor unions, while labor historian Philip S. Foner stated that these groups "resembled fraternal lodges more than trade unions".

=== Formation ===
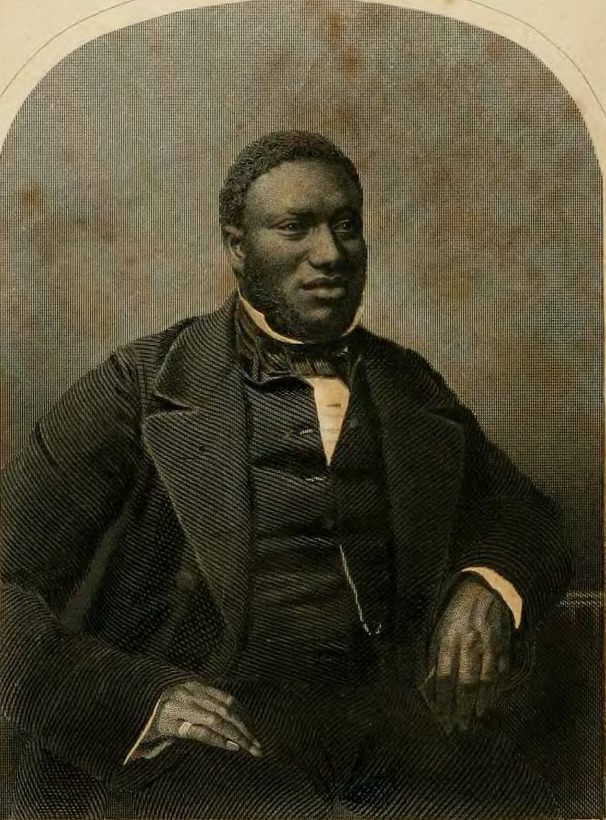
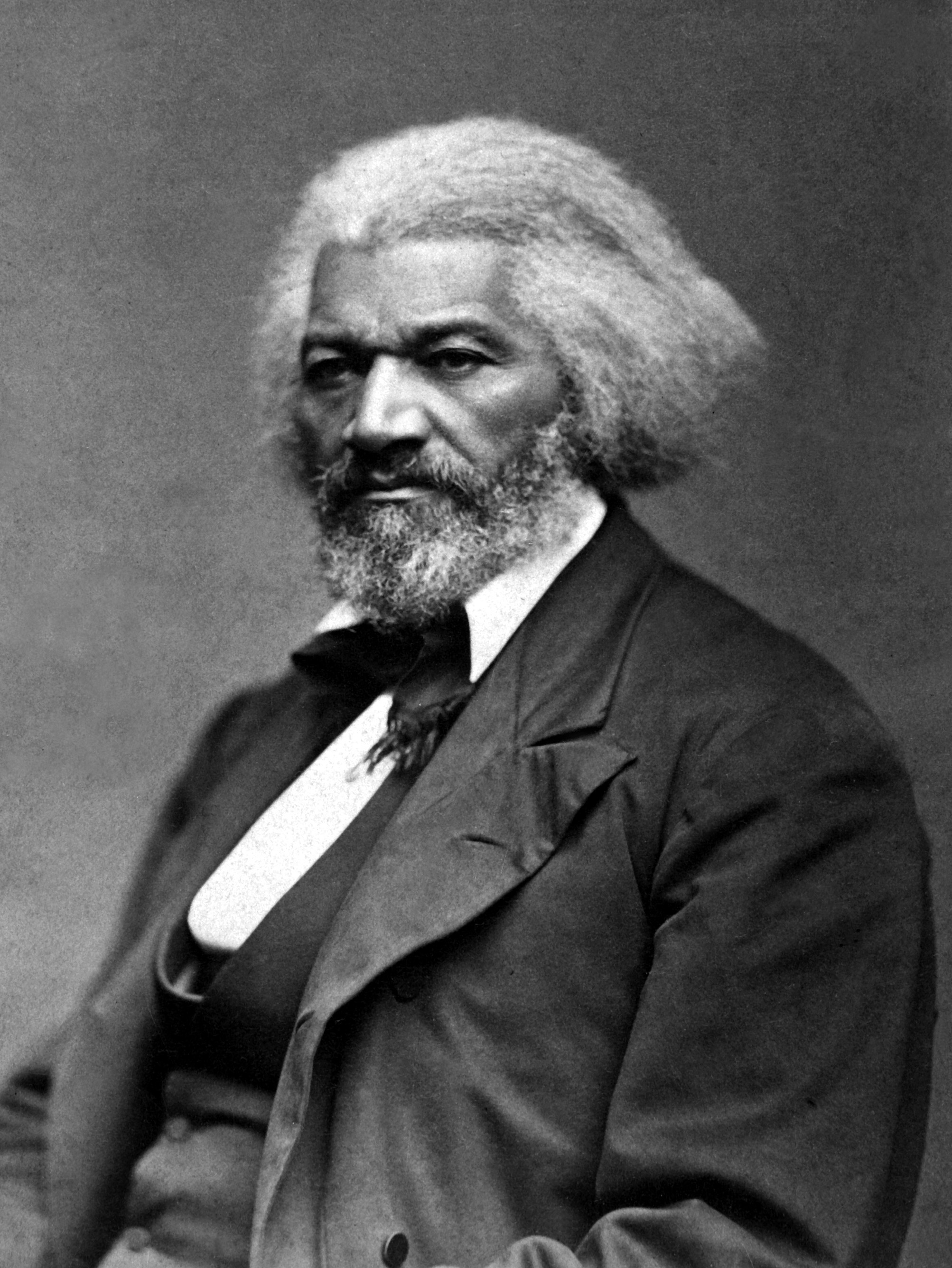
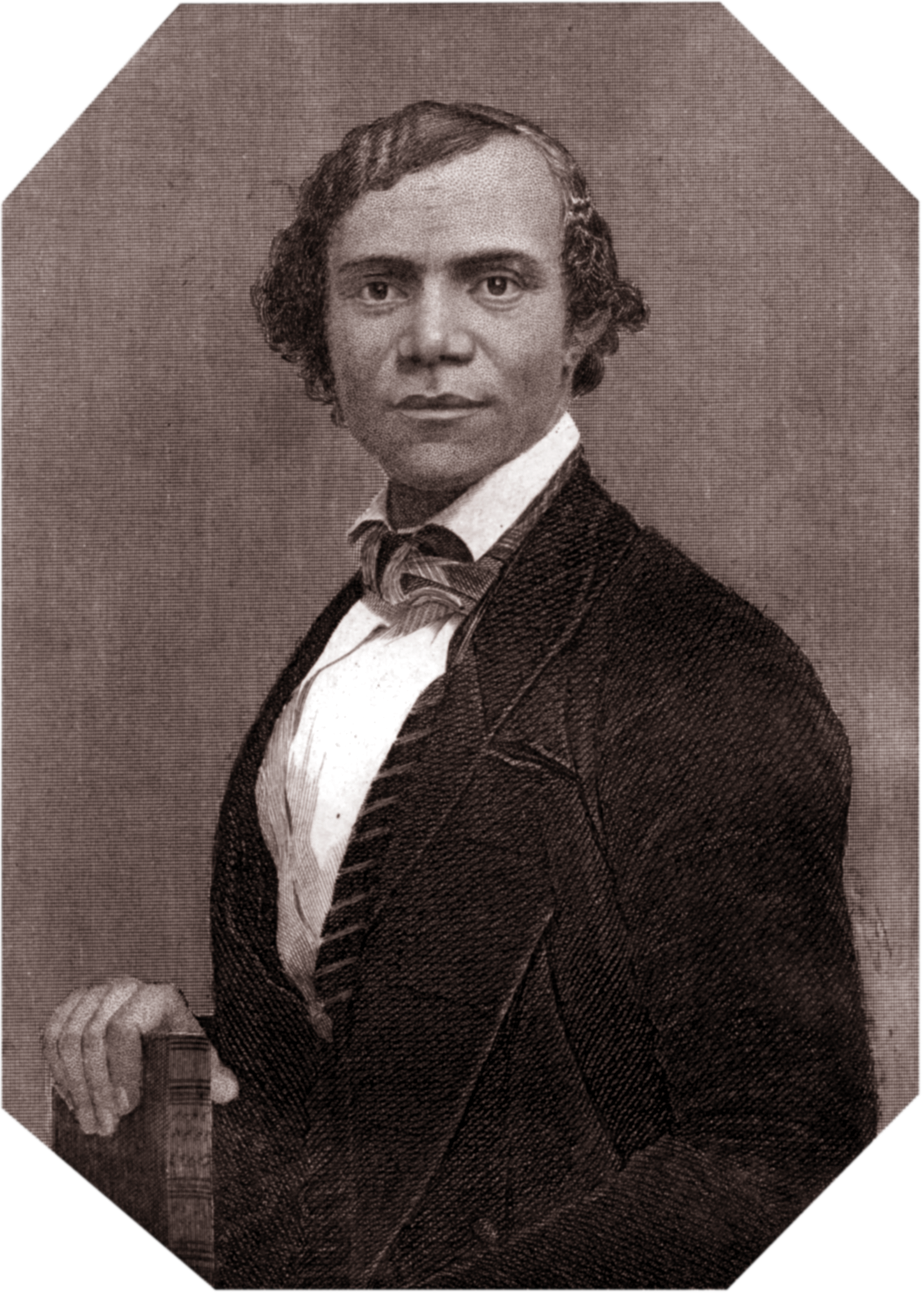
Officers for the league included (clockwise from top left) President Samuel Ringgold Ward, Vice Presidents Frederick Douglass and Lewis Woodson, and Secretary Henry Bibb.

On June 13, 1850, in response to the difficulties faced by African Americans in joining existing labor unions and as part of a wave of efforts towards black economic self-sufficiency and cooperation, several noted social reformers and black activists met at the Mother African Methodist Episcopal Zion Church at the intersection of Leonard Street and Church Street to establish the American League of Colored Laborers (ALCL). The national organization would represent free African Americans who were employed in skilled trades, such as mechanics, and it is considered by historian Lerone Bennett Jr. to be the first labor union established for black people in American history. (Note: In a 1972 article for Ebony, African-American historian Lerone Bennett Jr. called the organization "the first black labor union", a claim repeated in several 2010s articles on BlackPast.org. Other sources are less definitive with regards to whether the ALCL was the first black labor union in the United States. Labor journalist Kim Kelly stated in a 2019 publication that the ALCL was "one of the country's first black labor unions", while a 2023 article in the Louisville Political Review stated that it was "[p]ossibly the first Black labor union". A 2022 article on NewsOne.com states, "Some historians believe that the American League of Color [sic] Laborers was the first African American labor union to form".) Social reformer Frederick Douglass was instrumental in establishing the organization, alongside other noted reformers and activists of the era, such as George T. Downing, Charles Bennett Ray, Charles L. Reason, James McCune Smith, and Samuel Ringgold Ward. At the initial meeting, officers for the new group were selected, with Ward as president, Douglass as vice president (a position he shared with Lewis Woodson), and Henry Bibb as secretary. Additionally, an executive committee of 23 members was selected, with plans for this group to meet monthly to discuss league business. Douglass's involvement with the organization, as well as the participation of several editors from African American newspapers, helped the union to garner fairly widespread coverage in the black press.

=== Goals ===
Despite being a labor union, the league had goals that differentiated it from more traditional organized labor groups. In addition to its goal of promoting unity and cooperation among black mechanics and tradespeople, the union placed a great deal of emphasis on promoting more educational opportunities within the African American community, primarily in the fields of agriculture and industry. Douglass and Ward also envisioned that the league would eventually serve as a loan-giving organization for African American entrepreneurs, and starting with their initial meeting, the union announced plans to establish funds to provide money for people trying to open their own businesses. At an 1851 meeting, the union proposed the establishment of a mutual savings bank. Additionally, the union planned to hold an industrial fair in May 1852 to showcase black industry, with the proceeds from the fair being split between the tradespeople and the union. (Note: The tradespeople would receive 70 percent of the proceeds, while the union would keep the remainder.) These goals have led several historians to question how to properly categorize the league. (Note: Regarding the league, labor historian Philip S. Foner wrote in his 1974 book Organized Labor and the Black Worker, "Clearly, the league was interested in industrial education rather than trade-union activity; moreover, its orientation was toward the self-employed artisan". Historian Brian Greenberg expressed similar sentiments in a 2018 book. Historian Stuart McElderry wrote in Organizing Black America: An Encyclopedia of African American Associations (2001) that the league "was also intended as a mutual benefit society".)

=== Demise ===
The ALCL was a short-lived organization, with historian John Ernest writing in 2011 that the league disbanded shortly after its initial meeting and historian Stuart McElderry saying it "ceased to exist during the later half of the 1800s". Ultimately, the planned 1852 industrial fair never took place. Multiple reasons have been given for the league's downfall, with many historians noting that one of the largest issues facing the union was the small number of black artisans working in cities at the time. The league additionally suffered from the growth of white-only craft unions and increased European immigration that stifled the development of black industry, and McElderry additionally cites "poor leadership and internal disputes" within the organization. Historian Leslie M. Harris wrote in 2003 regarding the union, "The group united reformers who held varying views regarding ways to assist black workers, but does not seem to have attracted any workers". Ultimately, the union's demise was typical for black economic cooperative organizations of the era, as almost all such groups during this time were short-lived. Multiple historians have noted that the league's demise could be viewed as indicative of a growing class divide between the workers and the social reformers in the African American community during this time.

=== Later African American unionization efforts ===
In the years following the ALCL's demise, unionization efforts continued among African Americans, in particular among longshoremen in port cities such as Charleston, South Carolina, and New Orleans. In 1869, the Knights of Labor became the first white union to allow black people to join, though the union offered little support to its black members, as demonstrated in the events leading up to the Thibodaux massacre. Also in 1869, black activists met in Washington, D.C., in a conference that eventually led to the creation of the Colored National Labor Union, which Bennett cites as "[t]he first major national effort" towards a black nationwide union. Douglass would later serve as president of this union. As of 2019, the Coalition of Black Trade Unionists represents the interests of many African American union members in over 50 different unions, with labor journalist Kim Kelly calling the group "a bridge between the labor movement and the black community".

== See also ==
- African Americans in New York City
- Colored Conventions Movement
- List of labor unions in the United States

== Sources ==
- Alexander, Leslie M. (2012) [2008]. African Or American?: Black Identity and Political Activism in New York City, 1784-1861 (First Illinois paperback ed.). Champaign, Illinois: University of Illinois Press. ISBN 978-0-252-07853-8.
- Alexander, Leslie M. (2015a) [2007]. "Downing, George Thomas (1819–1903)". In Rodriguez, Junius (ed.). Encyclopedia of Emancipation and Abolition in the Transatlantic World. Vol. 1 (Routledge ed.). New York City: Routledge. pp. 180–181. ISBN 978-1-317-47180-6.
- Alexander, Leslie M. (2015b) [2007]. "Ray, Charles B. (1807–1886)". In Rodriguez, Junius (ed.). Encyclopedia of Emancipation and Abolition in the Transatlantic World. Vol. 2 (Routledge ed.). New York City: Routledge. pp. 448–449. ISBN 978-1-317-47180-6.
- Alexander, Leslie M. (2015c) [2007]. "Reason, Charles L. (1818–1893)". In Rodriguez, Junius (ed.). Encyclopedia of Emancipation and Abolition in the Transatlantic World. Vol. 2 (Routledge ed.). New York City: Routledge. pp. 451–452. ISBN 978-1-317-47180-6.
- Bennett, Lerone Jr. (November 1972). Johnson, John H. (ed.). "The Making of Black America: The Black Worker". Ebony. XXVIII (1). Chicago: Johnson Publishing Company: 150–154, 158, 160, 162.
- Bradley, Jonathan (January 4, 2011). "American League of Colored Laborers (1850-?)". BlackPast.org. Archived from the original on February 5, 2024.
- Dawson, Shannon (September 5, 2022). "5 Black-Led Labor Unions That Have Paved The Way For Black Workers' Rights". NewsOne. Archived from the original on December 1, 2023.
- Ernest, John (2011). A Nation Within a Nation: Organizing African-American Communities Before the Civil War. The American Ways Series. Chicago: Ivan R. Dee. ISBN 978-1-56663-917-0.
- Foner, Philip S. (1976) [1974]. Organized Labor and the Black Worker, 1619–1973 (First paperback ed.). New York City: International Publishers. ISBN 978-0-7178-0475-7.
- Fridy, Emma (February 10, 2023). "A Short History of Black Labor Movements in America". Louisville Political Review. Archived from the original on March 31, 2023.
- Greenberg, Brian (2018). The Dawning of American Labor: The New Republic to the Industrial Age. The American History Series. Hoboken, New Jersey: John Wiley & Sons. ISBN 978-1-119-06570-8.
- Harris, Leslie M. (2003). In the Shadow of Slavery: African Americans in New York City, 1626–1863. Chicago: University of Chicago Press. ISBN 978-0-226-31774-8.
- Hill, Herbert (December 1980). Marr, Warren II (ed.). "Black Labor and the NAACP". The Crisis. 87 (10). New York City: NAACP: 506–511.
- Jaynes, Gerald D., ed. (2005). "Labor Movement". Encyclopedia of African American Society. Thousand Oaks, California: SAGE Publications. pp. 491–494. ISBN 978-1-4522-6541-4.
- Kelly, Kim (February 7, 2019). "How Black Activists Shaped the Labor Movement". Teen Vogue. Condé Nast. Archived from the original on February 28, 2024.
- McElderry, Stuart (2005) [2001]. "American League of Colored Laborers". In Mjagkij, Nina (ed.). Organizing Black America: An Encyclopedia of African American Associations (Taylor & Francis e-Library ed.). New York City: Routledge. pp. 41–42. ISBN 978-1-135-58123-7.
- Mealey, Rich (March 29, 2012). "Stephen Myers (1800-1870)". BlackPast.org. Archived from the original on December 9, 2023.
- Nell, William Cooper (2002). "American League of Colored Laborers". In Wesley, Dorothy Porter; Uzelac, Constance Porter (eds.). William Cooper Nell, Nineteenth-century African American Abolitionist, Historian, Integrationist: Selected Writings from 1832–1874. Baltimore: Black Classic Press. pp. 263–264. ISBN 978-1-57478-019-2.
- Pearson, Chad (2005). "Labor". In Eisenstadt, Peter; Moss, Laura-Eve (eds.). The Encyclopedia of New York State. Foreword by Carole F. Huxley (First ed.). Syracuse, New York: Syracuse University Press. pp. 848–852. ISBN 978-0-8156-0808-0.
- Rael, Patrick (2002). Black Identity & Black Protest in the Antebellum North. Chapel Hill, North Carolina: University of North Carolina Press. ISBN 978-0-8078-7503-2.
- Walker, Juliet E. K. (1997). "Promoting Black Entrepreneurship and Business Enterprise in Antebellum America: The National Negro Convention, 1830–60". In Boston, Thomas D. (ed.). A Different Vision: Race and Public Policy. Vol. 2. New York City: Routledge. pp. 280–320. ISBN 978-0-415-12716-5.
