= 35th United States Colored Infantry Regiment =

35th United States Colored Infantry
- Active: February 8, 1864 - June 1, 1866
- Country: United States
- Allegiance: Union
- Branch: Infantry
- Engagements: Battle of Olustee; Battle of Honey Hill

The 35th United States Colored Infantry, originally known as the 1st North Carolina Colored Volunteers, was an infantry regiment that served in the Union Army during the American Civil War. The regiment was composed of African American enlisted men commanded by white officers and was authorized by the Bureau of Colored Troops which was created by the United States War Department on May 22, 1863.

== Origins ==
In May 1863, Edward Kinsley, an abolitionist and an emissary of Massachusetts Governor John Albion Andrew, traveled to Union-occupied New Bern, North Carolina to investigate the possibility of recruiting blacks to serve in the Union Army. Kinsley managed to secure a meeting with local black leaders one night. The leaders demanded, among other things, that blacks would be recruited on the condition that they would be serving in a struggle to end slavery, not only preserve the territorial integrity of the United States. The negotiations proved contentious and lasted into the morning, but Kinsley eventually ceded to their demands. Several days later, some of the black leaders led a procession of thousands of slaves into New Bern.

Many of the men subsequently enlisted at a recruitment office run by Brigadier General Edward A. Wild. Shortly thereafter, an officer reported that 600 men had been recruited. Most of the soldiers came from the Albemarle Region and southern Virginia. Wild oversaw the selection of officers in preparation for the raising of a black regiment, with 26 officers appointed on April 28, though the colonel and lieutenant colonel were not appointed until June 1. He had significant discretion in his choices and sought out candidates with military experience and political devotion to abolition and temperance. After failing to obtain the services of Edwin Upton of the 27th Massachusetts Volunteers, Wild appointed James Chaplin Beecher to serve as the new regiment's commander with the rank of colonel. While U.S. Army regulations at the time did not permit the use of black officers, Wild employed several, including William Nikolaus Reed—who was possibly mixed-race (Note: Contemporary military records do not indicate that Reed was colored, though later accounts describe him as mulatto.)—as lieutenant colonel, and John van Salee de Grasse as an assistant regimental surgeon. John N. Mars, a black reverend, was made the regimental chaplain. Attempts to staff the volunteers with black sergeants and non-commissioned officers were frustrated by the lack of literacy among the formerly enslaved soldiers, who would be expected to assume significant clerical duties. The regiment's officers assumed a greater share of the record-keeping burdens early on in their unit's history and eventually retained the services of several white veterans to serve as non-commissioned officers.

By June 7, seven companies of the regiment were organized in camp and conducting drills. Soldiers of the 45th Massachusetts Infantry Regiment, who held camp nearby, sometimes assisted with their training. Contraband women raised funds for the purchase of a flag for the new black regiment and gave them to Kinsley. A total of $150 was eventually raised. The regimental flag, featuring the Goddess of Liberty crushing a copperhead snake on one side and a rising sun on the other, was designed by Harriet Beecher Stowe, half-sister of the regiment commander. The flag was presented to General Wild in a formal ceremony held by the Colored Ladies' Relief Association of New Bern.

== Service ==
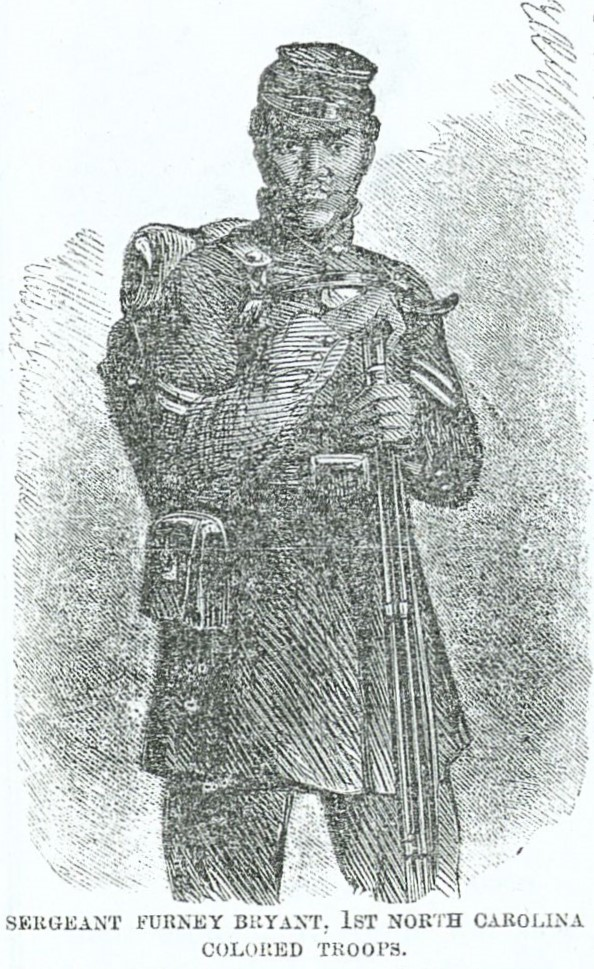
A sergeant of the 1st North Carolina Colored Volunteers

The 1st North Carolina Colored troops performed fatigue duties during the Siege of Charleston Harbor. In January 1864, Colonel Beecher left on leave and command of the regiment devolved to Lieutenant Colonel William N. Reed. On January 26, following complaints of its mixed and substandard armament, the volunteers were issued a uniform arsenal of .69 caliber muskets altered to operate with percussion caps. On February 7, 1864, the regiment arrived in Jacksonville, Florida with two other federal regiments to serve as an expeditionary force under the command of Major General Quincy Adams Gillmore. The 1st North Carolina Colored Volunteers was reorganized as the 35th U.S. Colored Infantry on February 8, 1864 for three-year service under the command of Colonel Beecher. Members of the unit were slow to adjust to the new designation.

The regiment was attached to Montgomery's Brigade, District of Florida, Department of the South, February 1864. During the Battle of Olustee, the first major incident of combat for the regiment, many of its guns burst in action, leading the army to revamp its supply of weapons. The regiment was then organized under the 2nd Brigade, Vogdes' Division, District of Florida, Department of the South, to April 1864. District of Florida, Department of the South, to October 1864. 4th Separate Brigade, Department of the South, to November 1864. 2nd Brigade, Coast Division, Department of the South, to December 1864. 4th Separate Brigade, Department of the South, to March 1865. 1st Separate Brigade, Department of the South, to August 1865. Department of the South, to June 1866.

The 35th U.S. Colored Infantry mustered out of service June 1, 1866.

== Detailed service ==
Expedition to Lake City, Florida, February 14–22, 1864. Battle of Olustee February 20. Duty at Jacksonville, Florida, until November. Operations on St. Johns River May 19–27. Horse Head Landing May 23. (Four companies detached on Expedition to James Island, South Carolina, July 1–10. King's Creek, South Carolina, July 3.) Raid from Jacksonville upon Baldwin July 23–28. South Fork, Black Creek, July 24. Black Creek near Whitesides July 27. Raid on Florida Railroad August 15–19. Ordered from Jacksonville to Hilton Head, South Carolina, November 25, Expedition to Boyd's Neck November 28–30. Battle of Honey Hill November 30. Return to Jacksonville, Florida, and duty there until March 1865. Ordered to Charleston, South Carolina, Duty there and at various points in the Department of the South until June 1866.

== Casualties ==
The regiment lost a total of 205 men during service; 4 officers and 49 enlisted men killed, 1 officer and 151 enlisted men died of disease.

== Commemoration ==
The state of North Carolina has established two monuments honoring the regiment. One stands at the National Cemetery in Wilmington and another, a historical highway marker, stands in New Bern.

== Commanders ==
- Colonel James C. Beecher - half-brother of author Harriet Beecher Stowe
- Lieutenant Colonel William Reed - commanded at the Battle of Olustee where he was mortally wounded
- Major Archibald Bogle - commanded after Ltc Reed was mortally wounded in action at the Battle of Olustee

== See also ==
- List of United States Colored Troops Civil War Units
- United States Colored Troops

== Bibliography ==
- Cecelski, David (2012). The Fire of Freedom: Abraham Galloway and the Slaves' Civil War. Chapel Hill: University of North Carolina. ISBN 978-1-4696-2190-6.
- Dyer, Frederick H. (1908). A Compendium of the War of the Rebellion. Des Moines: Dyer Publishing Company.
- Foote, Lorien (2021). Rites of Retaliation : Civilization, Soldiers, and Campaigns in the American Civil War. Chapel Hill: The University of North Carolina Press. ISBN 9781469665283.
- Reid, Richard M. (2008). Freedom for Themselves: North Carolina's Black Soldiers in the Civil War Era. Chapel Hill: The University of North Carolina Press. ISBN 0-8078-3174-3.
- Singleton, William Henry. Recollections of My Slavery Days (Raleigh, NC: Division of Archives and History, North Carolina Dept. of Cultural Resources), 1999. ISBN 0-8652-6287-X

Attribution
