= Olive Chapel African Methodist Episcopal Church =

Historic church in Missouri, United States

- U.S. National Register of Historic Places
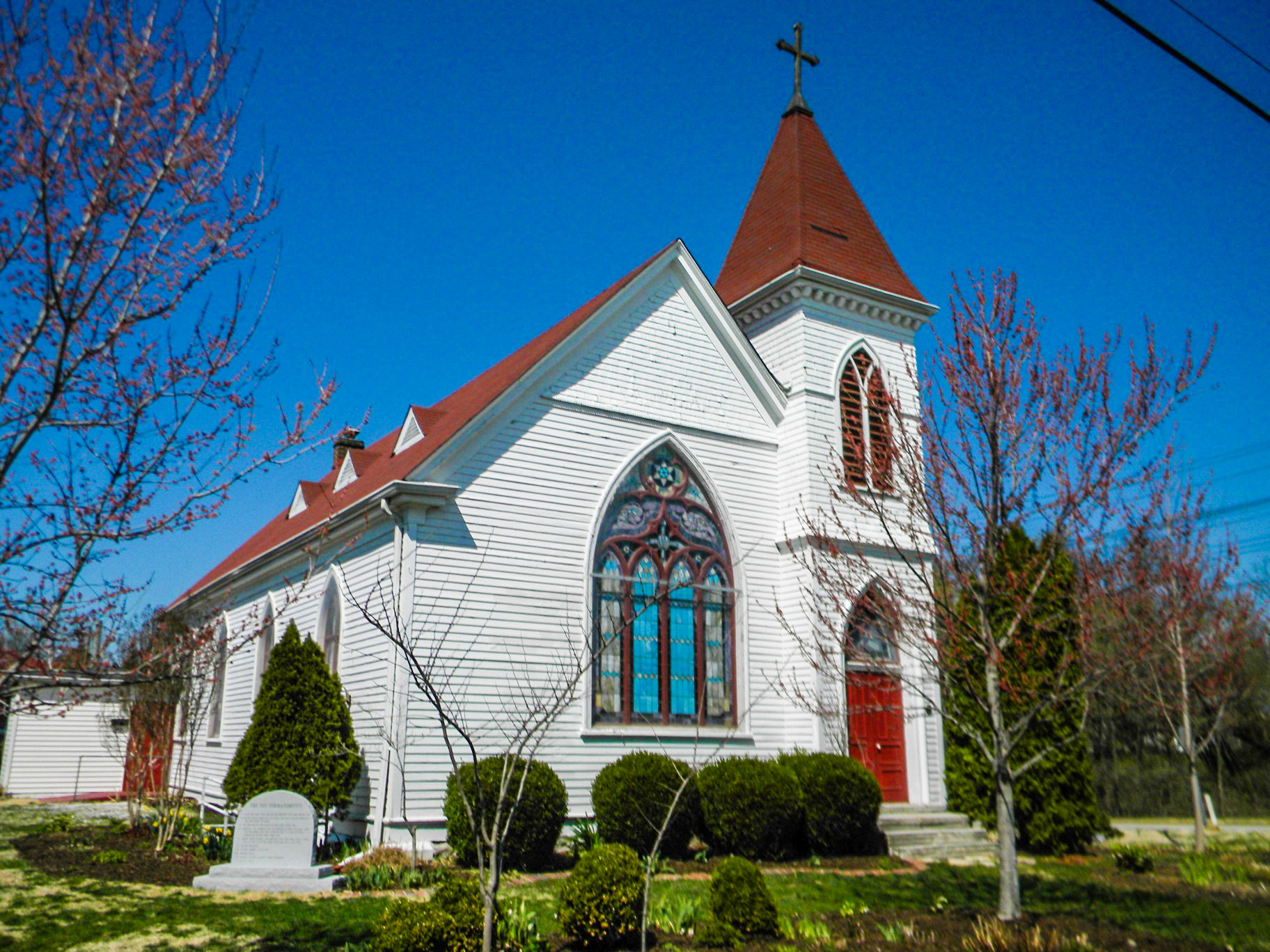

- Location within Missouri Location within the United States
- Location: 309 S. Harrison Ave., Kirkwood, Missouri
- Coordinates: 38°34′44″N 90°24′39″W
- Area: less than one acre
- Built: 1899
- Architect: Peter Bopp
- Architectural style: Gothic Revival
- MPS: Kirkwood MPS
- NRHP reference No.: 04000345
- Added to NRHP: April 20, 2004

Olive Chapel African Methodist Episcopal Church (also known as Olive Chapel AME Church, and Evangelische Friedens Gemneinde Lutheran Congregation) is a historic church built in 1899, and located at 309 S. Harrison Avenue in Kirkwood, Missouri. It is the oldest Protestant church in Kirkwood. It was added to the National Register of Historic Places on April 20, 2004.

== History ==
The congregation was founded in 1853 by the Reverend Jordan Winston Early. Services were initially held in a private home.

The current church building, constructed in 1899, originally housed the Friedens Evangelical Lutheran Church/Peace Lutheran Church. The Olive Chapel AME congregation bought it in 1923. The church still has its original bell, pews, and stained glass windows.

The Quinette Cemetery was associated with this church from 1866 until 2002.

== See also ==
- African Methodist Episcopal Church
