= Philip B. Downing =

African American inventor

Philip Bell Downing
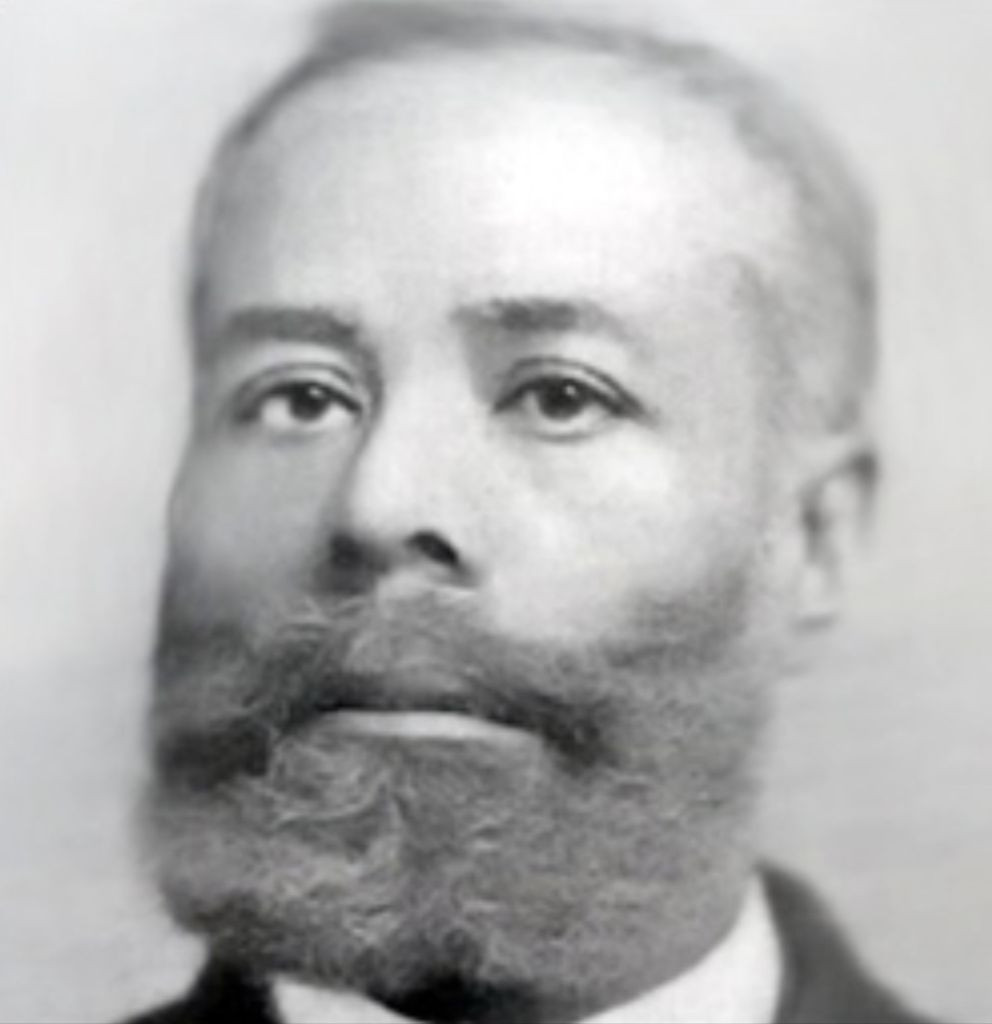
- Born: March 22, 1857; Providence, Rhode Island
- Died: June 8, 1934 (aged 77); Boston, Massachusetts
- Occupation: Inventor
- Years active: 28
- Known for: Patenting a street letter box, and operating street railway switches

Phillip Bell Downing (March 22, 1857- June 8, 1934) was an African-American inventor from Providence, Rhode Island. He is known for his most significant invention, the operating street railway switch. This allowed the switches to be opened or closed by using a brass arm located next to the brake handle on the platform of the car. It also allowed the switches to be changed automatically in some cases. He also aided in the development of the current day Street Mailbox 33 years and seven months after a patent was granted to Albert Potts for the first mailbox in the United States. Downing also patented an anti tampering function in the mailbox (though not the only one). The function protected the mail inside the box from the elements when the flap is open and from other tampering. His last patents involved an envelope moistener which used a roller and a small water tank, and an easily accessible desktop notepad.

== Early life ==
Philip was born in Providence, Rhode Island to George Thomas Downing (1819-1903) and Serena L. Degrasse (1823-1893). His father was a prominent businessman and abolitionist and Serena was from New York. Philip's grandfather, Thomas Downing (1791-1866) was born to former slaves in Virginia and established Downing’s Oyster House in the financial district of Manhattan in 1825.

== Inventions ==
=== Street-railway switch ===
On June 17, 1890, the U.S. Patent Office approved Downing’s application for “new and useful Improvements in Street-Railway Switches.” His invention allowed the switches to be opened or closed by using a brass arm located next to the brake handle on the platform of the car. It also allowed the switches to be changed automatically in some cases.

=== Letter-box ===
On October 27, 1891 Downing filed his most famous patent, a patent for a form of anti-tampering letter box lid.

=== Envelop-moistener ===
25 years after his mailbox patent, Downing filed another patent for an envelope moistener on January 26, 1917, which utilized a roller and a small, attached water tank, to quickly moisten envelopes.

=== Desk appliance ===
On December 20, 1917, Downing filed a patent for a desk appliance that was supposed "to provide a simple apparatus whereby a roll of paper may be supported for ready use for writing short notes such as shop orders, telephone messages, etc., or for Writing longer manuscripts."

== Personal life ==
(not known)

== Patents ==
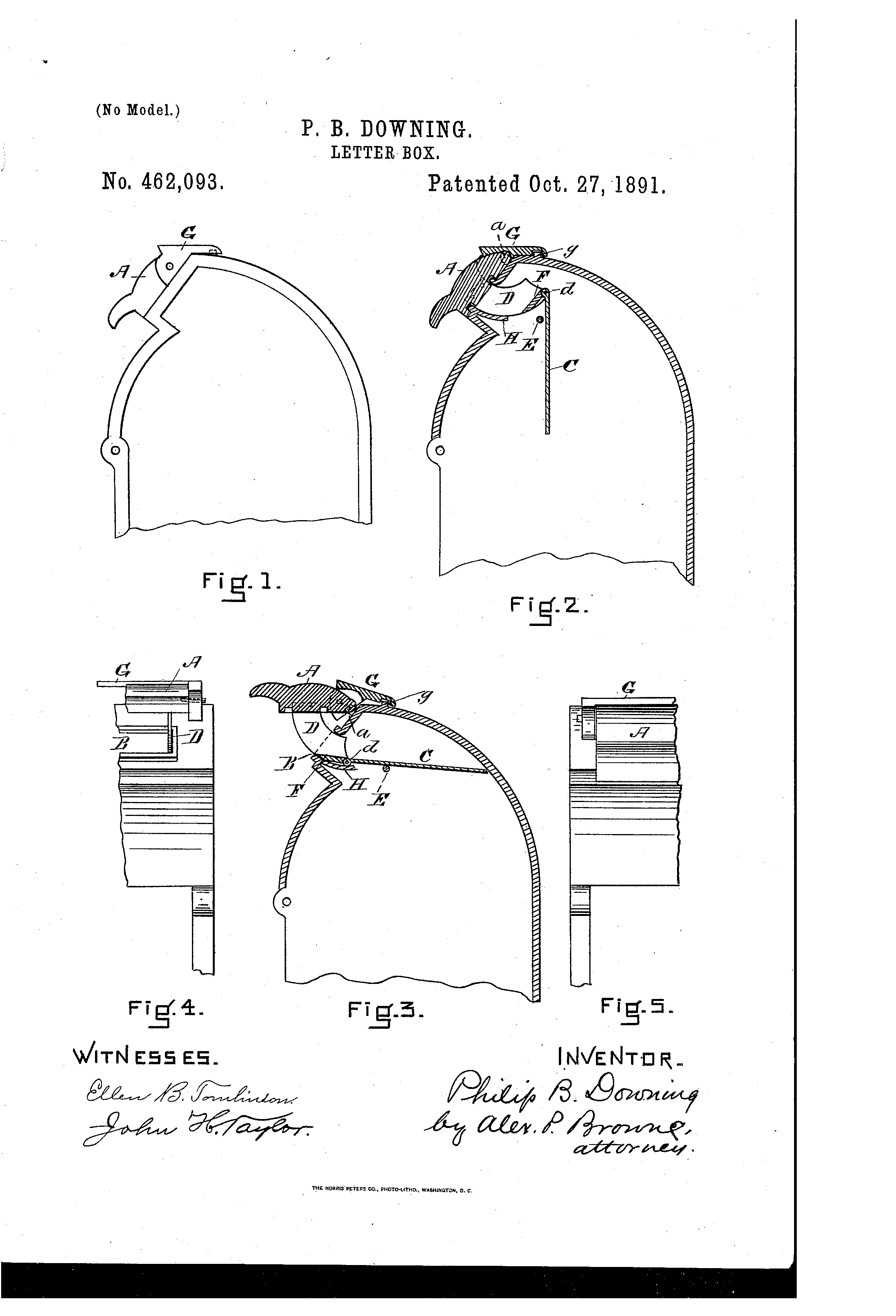
Downing's mail box patent

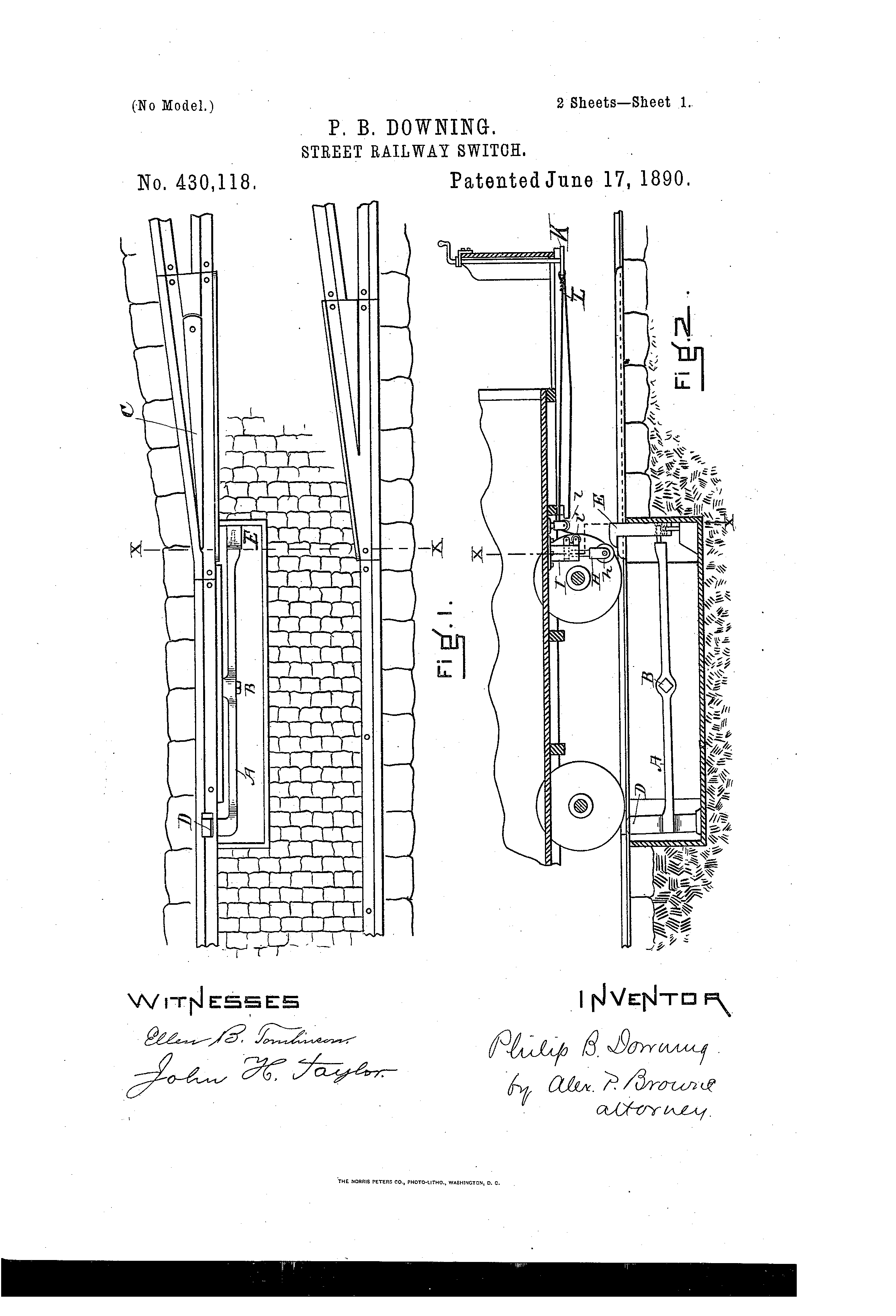
Downing's patent street railway switch page 1

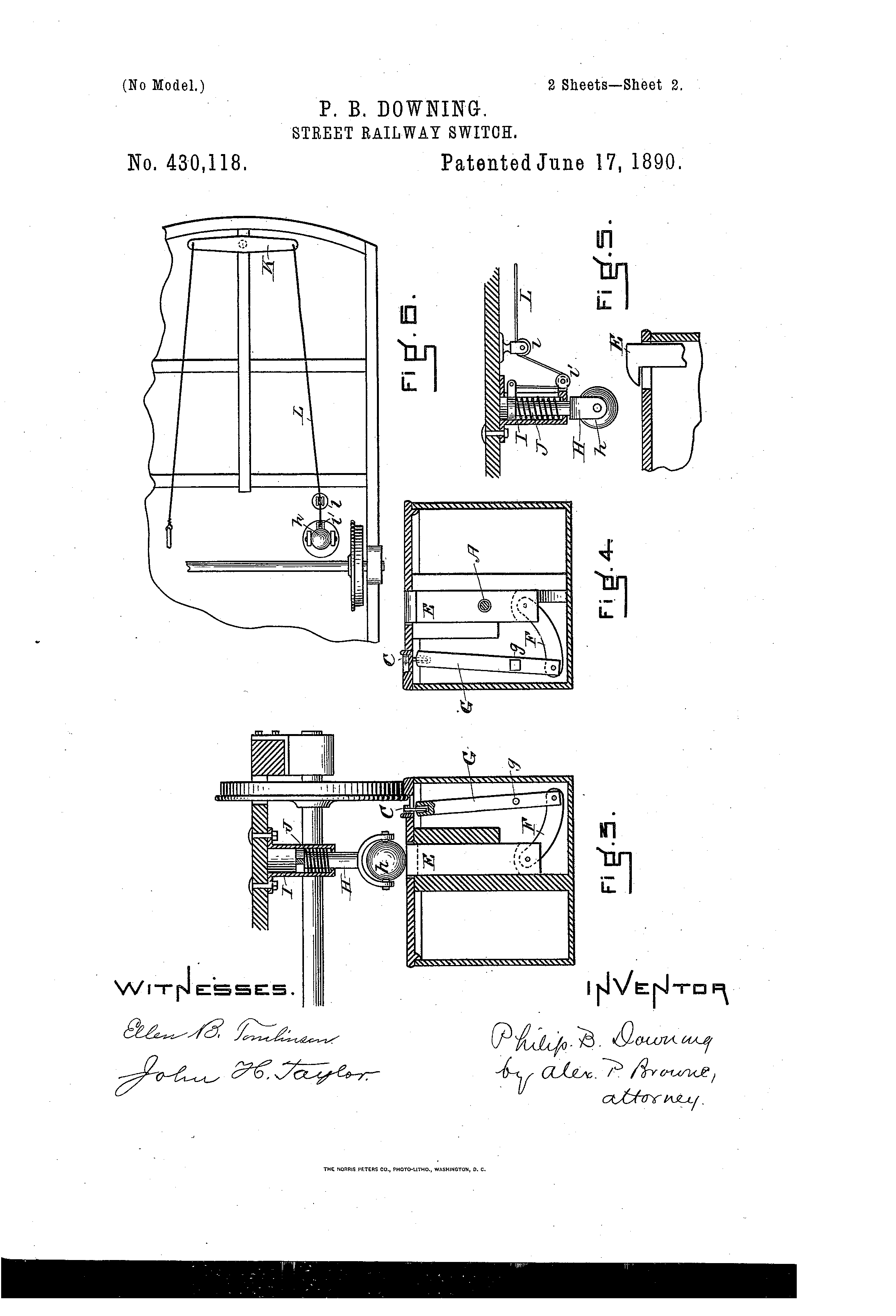
Downing's patent street railway switch page 2

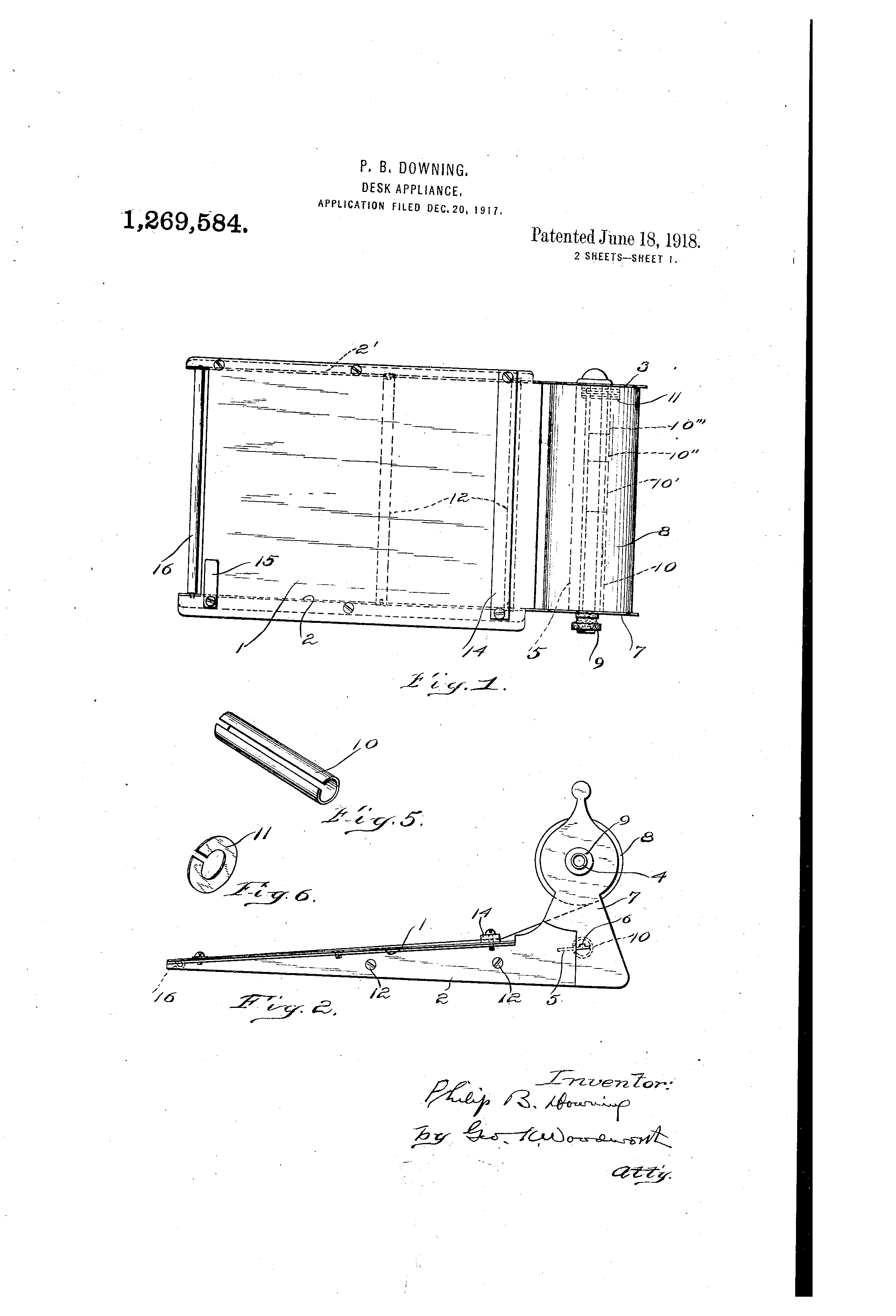
Downing's desk appliance patent

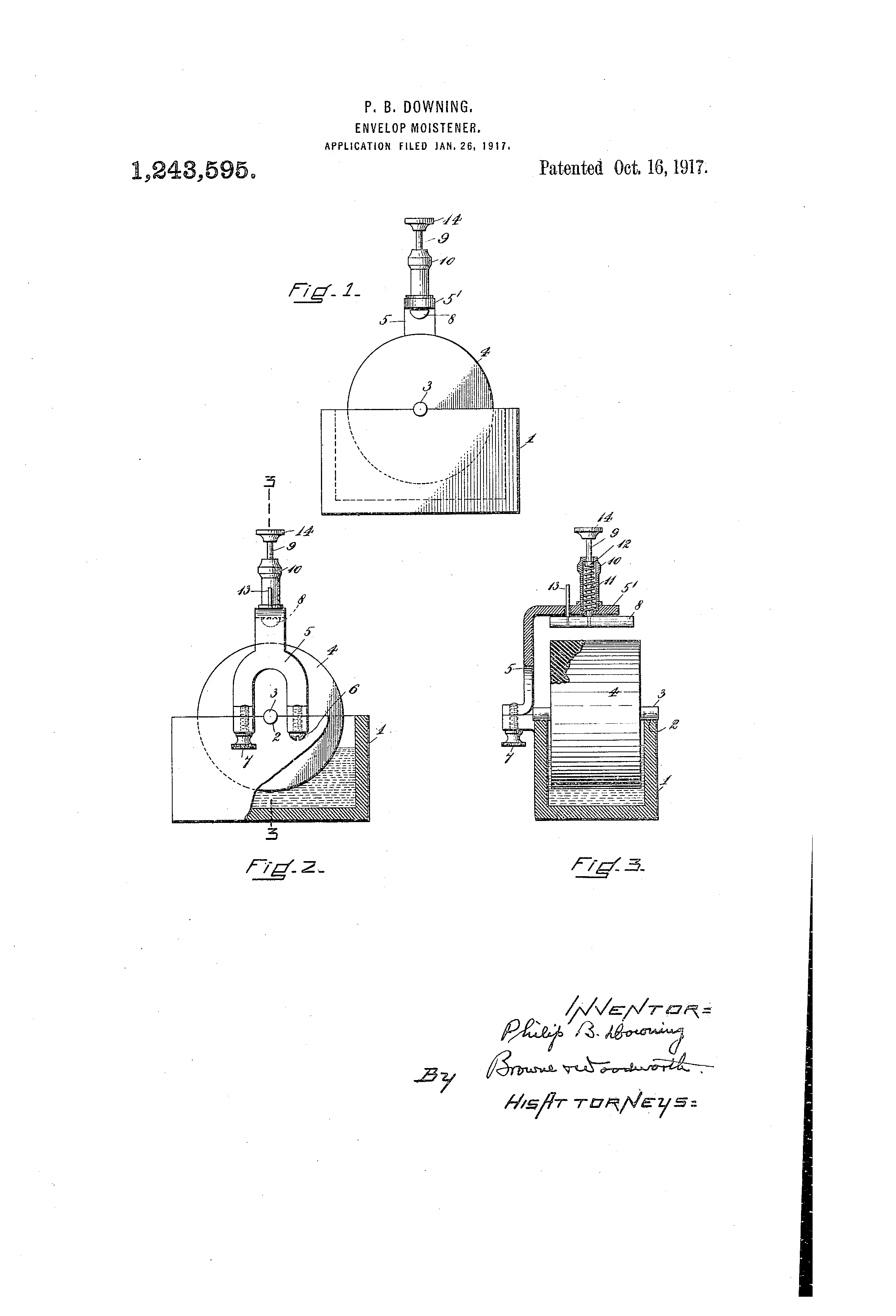
Downing's envelop-moistener patent
