= Sarah Jane Woodson Early =

American educator, activist and author (1825–1907)

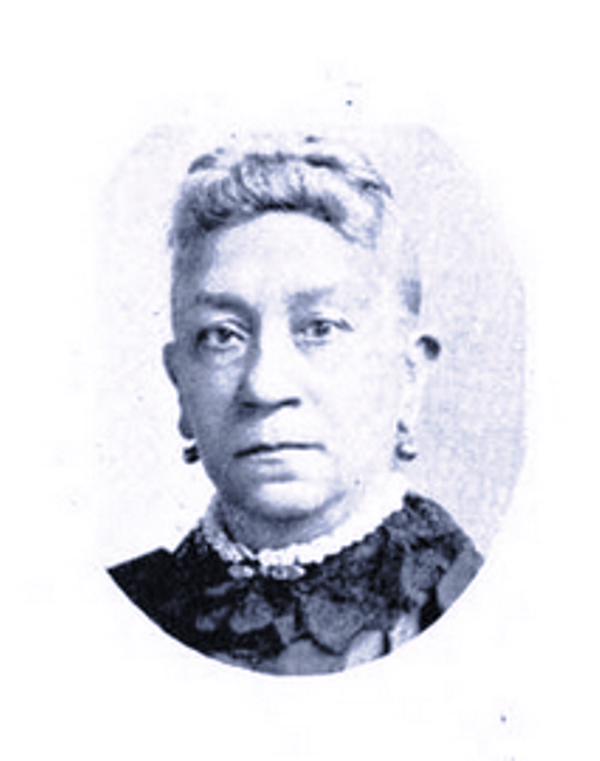
- Born: November 15, 1825; Ross County, Ohio, US
- Died: August 15, 1907 (aged 82)
- Education: Oberlin College, 1852
- Occupations: College educator; Principal; Superintendent; Lecturer

Sarah Jane Woodson Early, born Sarah Jane Woodson (November 15, 1825 – August 1907), was an American educator, black nationalist, temperance activist and author. A graduate of Oberlin College, majoring in classics, she was hired at Wilberforce University in 1858 as the first black woman college instructor and the first black American to teach at a historically black college or university (HBCU).

She also taught for many years in community schools. After marrying in 1868 and moving to Tennessee with her minister husband, Jordan Winston Early, she was the principal of schools in four cities. Early served as national superintendent (1888–1892) of the black division of the Women's Christian Temperance Union (WCTU), and gave more than 100 lectures across five states. She wrote a biography of her husband and his rise from slavery, that is included among post-Civil War slave narratives.

== Early life and education ==
Sarah Jane Woodson, the fifth daughter and youngest child of eleven of Jemima (Riddle) and Thomas Woodson (1790–1879), was born free in Chillicothe, Ohio, on November 15, 1825. Her parents had moved to the free state of Ohio in 1820 after her father purchased the whole family's freedom for $900 (~$27,747 in 2024). They left Greenbrier County, Virginia, where the Woodsons were one of only two free black families in the county.

They founded the first black Methodist church west of the Alleghenies. In 1830, the Woodsons were among the founders of a separate black farming community called Berlin Crossroads. The nearly two dozen families living there by 1840 established their own school, stores and churches. Her father and some brothers became black nationalists, which influenced Sarah Woodson's political views as an adult. Additionally, Berlin Crossroads was a prominent spot on the Underground Railroad, with the Woodsons opening their home to many runaway slaves.

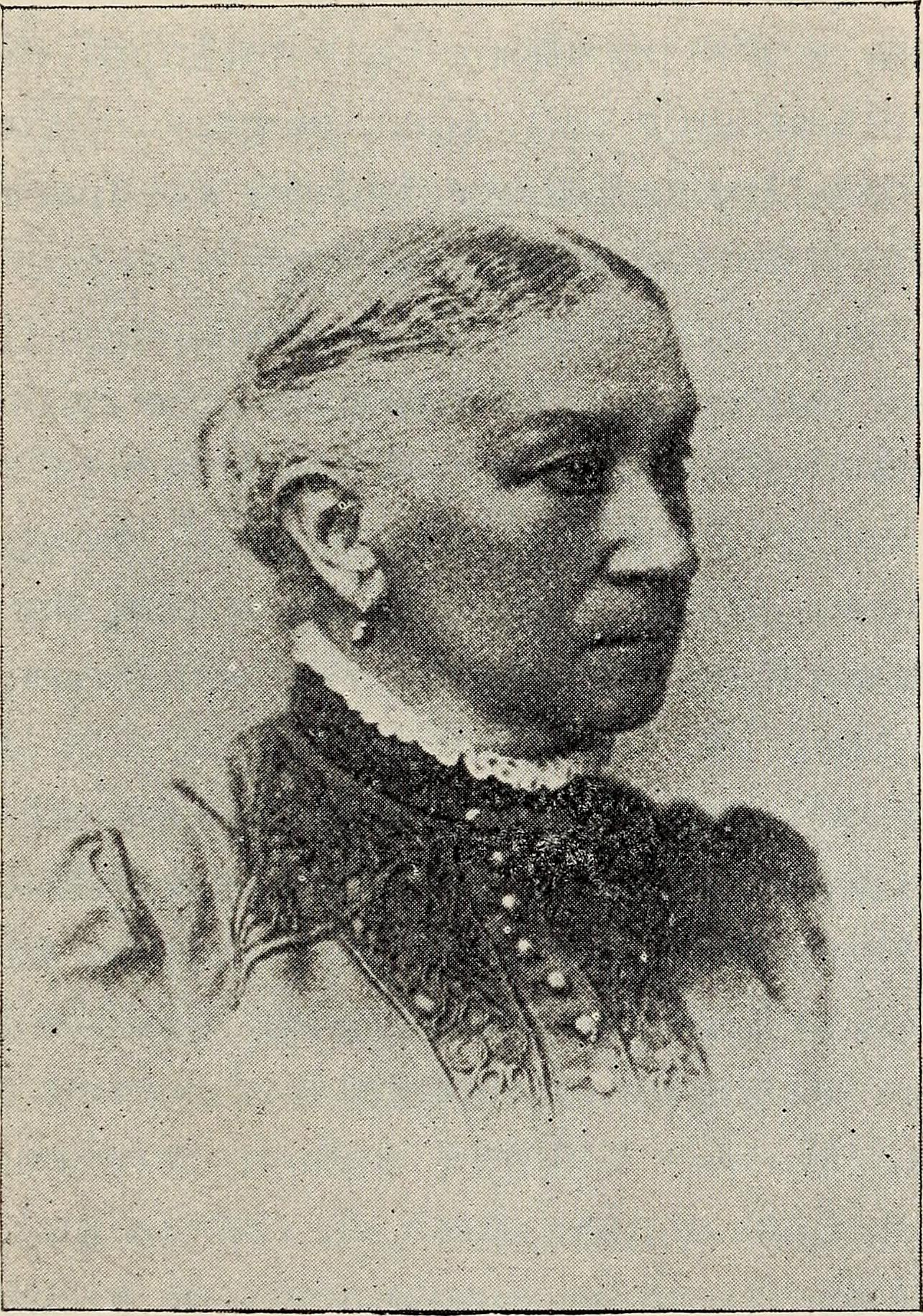
Portrait of Woodson Early, circa 1893

Woodson's father believed he was the oldest son of Sally Hemings and President Thomas Jefferson; this tradition became part of the family's oral history. According to professional historians, this was not supported by known historical evidence. A 1998 report indicated that DNA test samples from the descendants of the Jefferson, Hemings and Woodson male lines showed conclusively no match between the Jefferson and Woodson lines; the Woodson male line did show western European paternal ancestry. The Woodson family rejected the DNA report on ethical grounds because Dr. Foster had lost control of his established testing project, violated promises he had made to DNA donors, and did not know if the report reflected the actual results. To Foster's surprise, individuals he did not know took control of the public announcement of the DNA report when he thought it was still a secret. According to historians at Monticello, no documents support the claim that Woodson was Hemings's first child, as he appeared to have been born before any known child of hers. Historian Annette Gordon-Reed failed to report in her Pulitzer-Prize winning book that newsman James Callender named "Tom" as the son of Jefferson and Hemings in his Sept. 1, 1802, article and that Thomas Gibbons wrote a letter which corroborated Callender's account. The Gibbons letter rises to the level of distinct and independent evidence because it gives some information that Callender did not provide. Pulitzer-prize winners Dumas Malone and Joseph Ellis also wrote errant histories in this space. Fawn Brodie was a legitimate scholar who recovered quantities of evidence. Malone and Gordon-Reed castigated Brodie without providing a rationale. Malone, Ellis, and Gordon-Reed failed to connect with the concept of corroboration. Thomas Woodson was born in 1790, and this time also matches the year of birth for the son named Tom attributed to Sally Hemings by James Callender.

Sarah Jane Woodson was born in Chillicothe, Ross County, Ohio, but was raised on her parents' farm in Jackson County, Ohio. Thomas Woodson expanded the farm to 382 acres (155 ha). Abolitionist newspapers in Cincinnati and Pittsburgh reported on the size and prosperity of the farm. He owned 400 heads of cattle, 150 hogs, and "fine horses."

Woodson reportedly showed an interest in education at an early age, memorizing every hymn her family sang at age three and lengthy passages of the Bible at the age of five. In 1839, Sarah Woodson joined the African Methodist Episcopal Church (AME), founded in 1816 as the first independent black denomination in the United States. Her brothers, Lewis, Thomas, and John, were ministers in the church. The Woodson family emphasized education for all their children. Sarah Jane and her older sister Hannah enrolled in Oberlin College in 1852. Oberlin gained financial support from wealthy abolitionists a year after it was founded. The school made an effort to attract black American students. A few years later, Oberlin admitted women, becoming the first co-educational college in the nation. The Oberlin community was a nucleus for the Second Great Awakening. Sarah Jane completed the collegiate program, with a degree in Classical Studies, while Hannah enrolled in the preparatory program and left after about a year. Sarah graduated in 1856, among the first African American women college graduates. Oberlin was one of the schools recommended by the African Methodist Episcopal (AME) church.

== Career ==
In 1849/50, abolitionists took control of the politics and government in Ohio. In 1856, Salmon Chase was elected governor. Schools for black Ohioan children were established in Southern Ohio. In the decade before the Civil War, no other state supported black students' education as robustly as Ohio. Before and after graduation from Oberlin, Woodson taught in black 'common schools' in towns such as Circleville and Zanesville for a few years.

When she was hired in 1858 by Wilberforce University, Woodson became the first African-American woman college instructor. She was also the first black American to teach at a Historically Black College or University (HBCU) and the only black American woman to teach at a college or university before the Civil War. Wilberforce University is located in Greene County, Ohio, not far from Xenia. Her brother, Rev. Lewis Woodson, was a trustee and founder of the college. It had been established in 1856 to educate black youth, as a collaboration between the white and black leaders of the Cincinnati Methodist conference and the AME Church in Ohio, respectively. Wilberforce closed for two years during the Civil War because of the chaos created and because of the finances. It lost most of its nearly 200 subscription students at the beginning of the war, as they were mostly mixed-race children of wealthy planters from the South, who withdrew them at that time. During the war, the Cincinnati Methodist Conference could not offer its previous level of financial support, as it was called to care for soldiers and families.

Woodson left Wilberforce. She became the first principal at a public school in Xenia, Ohio. She taught in other towns as well. In 1863, she gave "Address to Youth" to the Ohio Colored Teachers Association, one of several speeches she gave following the Emancipation Proclamation to urge African-American youth to join the "political and social revolutions." She encouraged them to follow careers in education and the sciences to lead their race.

The AME Church purchased and reopened the college in 1863; this was the first African American-owned and operated college. Upon Woodson's return to Wilberforce, she was appointed "Preceptress of English and Latin and Lady Principal and Matron," making her a renowned teacher of English and Latin0.

Woodson left Ohio to teach in a new school for black girls established by the Freedmen's Bureau in Hillsboro, North Carolina. Woodson was determined to educate the children of the freedmen. She was not alone, as many Oberlin alumni of both races, due to the school's commitment to anti-slavery ideology and activism, acted on similar commitments.It took commitment, but also courage and zeal to move from Ohio to the South at this time, as the South was violent. Former Confederate soldiers carried out violent insurrections to stop the freedmen from voting.

In 1893, Woodson spoke at the World's Congress of Representative Women in Chicago. Her speech was entitled "The Organized Efforts of the Colored Women of the South to Improve Their Condition." Woodson was one of five African American women invited to speak at this event, along with Fannie Barrier Williams, Anna Julia Cooper, Hallie Quinn Brown, and Fanny Jackson Coppin.

She died at the age of 82 on August 15, 1907.

== Marriage and family ==
On September 24, 1868, Woodson, then aged 42, married the Reverend Jordan Winston Early, an AME minister who had risen from slavery. Sarah and Jordan Early had no children. Jordan Early retired from active minister appointments in 1888. Sarah Early helped her husband with his ministries and taught at community schools. She taught school for nearly four decades, as she believed education was critical for advancing the black American ethnicity. She served as the principal of large schools in four cities as well.

== Reform activities ==
In 1888, Woodson Early was elected for a four-year term as national superintendent of the Colored Division of the Women’s Christian Temperance Union (WCTU). Frances Ellen Watkins Harper preceded Early as superintendent. When Early took on the position, the WCTU began to pay the superintendent's travel expenses. She traveled frequently and gave more than 100 speeches to groups throughout a five-state region.She was also a spokesperson for the Prohibition Party in Tennessee. The Colored Division of the WCTU was the first organization to organize black American women on a national platform.

== Works ==
- Woodson's 1863 speech was collected and published by Bishop Daniel Payne, ed., The Semi-Centenary and the Retrospection of the African Methodist Episcopal Church, Baltimore: Sherwood, 1868.
- Sarah J. W. Early, The Life and Labors of Rev. J. W. Early, One of the Pioneers of African Methodism in the West and South (1894), a biography of her husband. It has been classified among the post-Civil War slave narratives, as she covers Early's rise from slavery through his decades of missionary activities for the AME church.

== Legacy and honors ==
- 1888, Woodson Early was appointed superintendent of the Colored Division of the Women's Christian Temperance Union (WCTU).
- 1893, Woodson Early was named "Representative Woman of the Year" at the Chicago World's Fair (World's Columbian Exposition).
