= John van Salee de Grasse =

American physician (1825–1868)

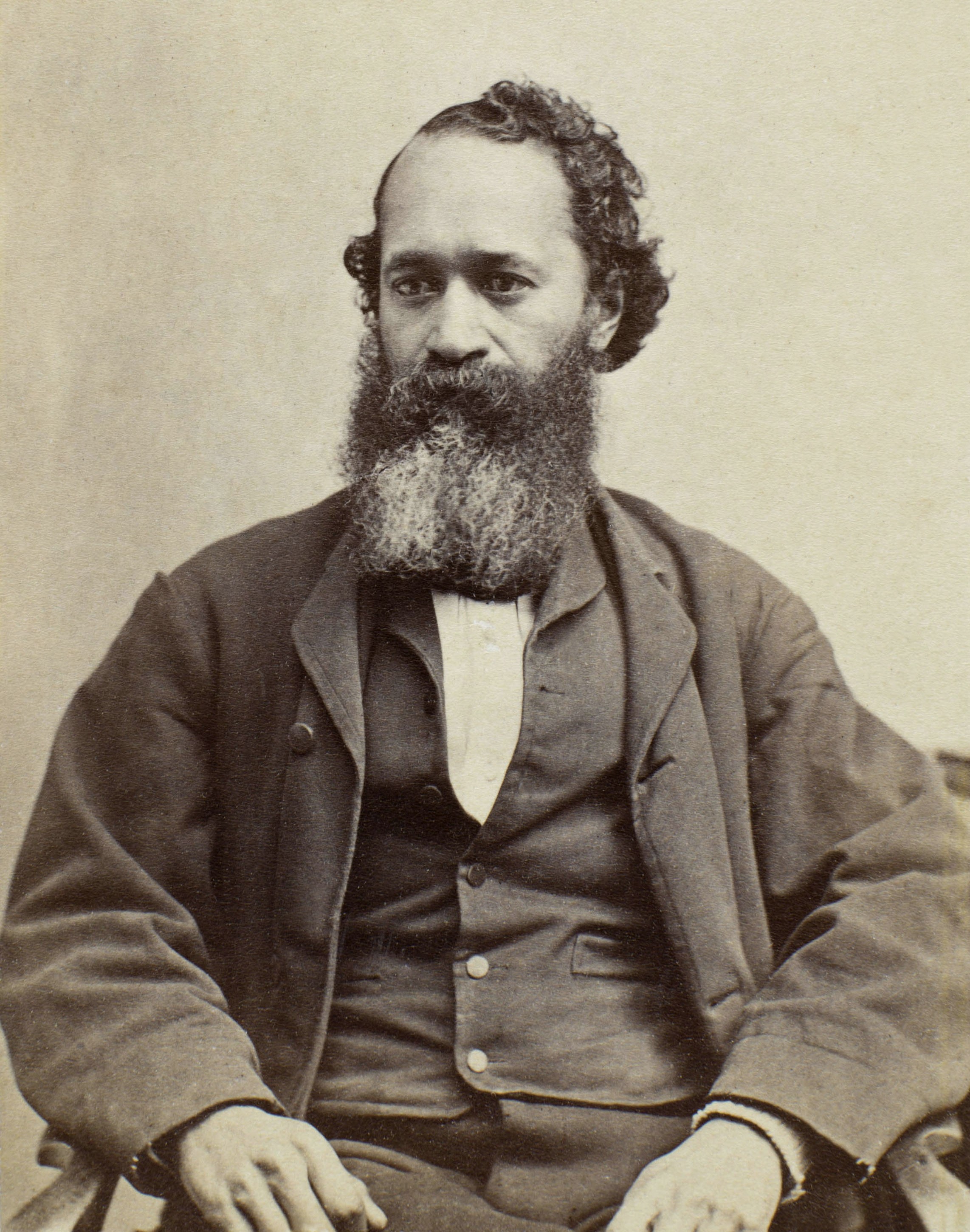
- John de Grasse circa 1865
- Born: June 6, 1825; New York City, U.S.
- Died: November 25, 1868 (aged 43); Boston, Massachusetts, U.S.
- Other name: John Van Surley DeGrasse
- Education: Oneida Institute; Clinton Liberal Institute; Bowdoin College
- Occupation: Physician
- Relatives: Isaiah DeGrasse (brother)

John van Salee de Grasse (or John Van Surley DeGrasse, June 6, 1825– November 25, 1868) was the first black medical doctor admitted to a United States medical society and a commissioned physician during the American Civil War. Born June 1825 in New York City to Count George DeGrasse and Maria Van Surly, he enrolled in Oneida Institute in New York at fifteen, later pursuing medical studies at Aubuk College in Paris. DeGrasse earned his medical degree with honors from Bowdoin College’s Medical School of Maine in May 1849, becoming the second African American to do so in the United States. Following graduation, he practiced medicine in Paris alongside renowned surgeon Alfred A.L.M. Velpeau before returning to the U.S. in 1851. He supported abolitionism and efforts to resist the Fugitive Slave Act of 1850 by aiding in organizing vigilante groups to oppose slave hunters in Boston.

In 1863 Grasse served as an assistant surgeon with the 35th United States Colored Infantry Regiment. During the American Civil War, de Grasse served in the Union Army as a surgeon with the 54th Massachusetts Infantry Regiment, the first unit formed of the United States Colored Troops.

== Early life and family ==
John van Salee de Grasse (sometimes referred to as John Van Surley DeGrasse) was born in New York City. His elder brother, Isaiah George DeGrasse, graduated from the University of Delaware in 1836 and became a Protestant Episcopal minister. His sister, Serena, married George T. Downing, who became a successful restaurateur, abolitionist, and African American civil rights activist.

The siblings' mother was Maria Van Salee of New York, a free woman of color (her surname was sometimes recorded as Van Surly).

They were descendants through their mother's family of Jan Janszoon of Haarlem, Netherlands, and Margarita, a Moorish woman. That couple had four mixed-race sons: two, Abraham Janszoon van Salee, and his better-known brother Anthony. Anthony emigrated independently to New Netherlands from Amsterdam in the 1630s, settling in New York. Each had married a European woman. Their later generations of descendants, who continued to "marry white", are said to include the Vanderbilts, the Whitneys, Jacqueline Kennedy Onassis, and Humphrey Bogart. Abraham was said to have also had a son in New York by a black mistress, establishing a line identified as African American while also having considerable European ancestry.

Maria van Salee had married George de Grasse, who was born in Calcutta as Azar Le Guen; he was of mixed-race, Indian-French ancestry. He is likely the son of François Joseph Paul de Grasse, a French naval officer who was stationed on and off in India from 1762 to 1781. Based on census records, Azar was born about 1780 to an Indian woman. The senior de Grasse took Azar as a child with him to Paris, sponsored his education, and adopted him, naming him George de Grasse. The senior Grasse was long married to a French woman and had a total of five children from his marriage who survived to adulthood. His eldest son, Alexandre Auguste de Grasse, held the title of Comte de Grasse after his father's death.

George de Grasse immigrated as a young man to the United States, settling in New York City by 1799. His older French half-siblings had emigrated from France to Saint-Domingue to escape the French Revolution. During the Haitian Revolution, they fled to Charleston, South Carolina. De Grasse worked for a period for Aaron Burr, who gave him two lots in the Five Points area of Lower Manhattan, making him a landowner as a free man of color. With his French-South Asian ancestry, he escaped some of the restrictions against African Americans. He became a naturalized U.S. citizen in 1804.

== Education ==
John de Grasse studied at the Oneida Institute in upstate New York for one year starting in 1840 before transferring to the nearby Clinton Liberal Institute. He journeyed to Paris, where he studied medicine for two years at Aubuk College in Paris. He then returned to New York in November 1845, studying medicine privately under Dr. Samuel R. Childs before attending Bowdoin College's Medical School of Maine in Brunswick, where he earned a medical degree with honors on May 19, 1849. De Grasse was the first person of color to earn a medical degree at a United States college. Later that same year, he toured Europe and worked for a time as an assistant to French anatomist and surgeon Alfred-Armand-Louis-Marie Velpeau in Paris.

== Medical and military career ==
In 1851, de Grasse returned to the United States, settling in Boston. On August 5, 1852, he married Cordelia Lucretia Howard of Boston. Her parents were Peter and Margaret (Gardner) Howard. De Grasse established a private medical practice in Boston by July 1853. While his daily work often involved routine tasks like visits and prescriptions, his treatments included practices like bloodletting and inoculation during a smallpox epidemic in 1854. Medical records reveal the diseases he encountered, such as cholera and venereal diseases, offering insights into his patients' health and the medical challenges of the era. He operated in historically Black neighborhoods such as Poplar Street. His practice primarily catered to patients residing in the Fifth and Sixth Wards, areas with a historical significance as predominantly inhabited by Black communities. Presently, these neighborhoods are identified as Beacon Hill and the West End, respectively. He served both relatives and non-relatives, including prominent figures like abolitionists and emerging African American leaders. His patient base extended beyond the African American community to include individuals from diverse backgrounds, including those born in slave states and immigrants from Ireland. On August 24, 1854, he gained admittance to the Massachusetts Medical Society, becoming the first African American to join any medical society in the United States. Degrasse and his wife he had a daughter, Georgiana Cordelia DeGrasse, in December 1855.

When the United States Colored Troops were authorized for the Union Army in 1863, Grasse served as an assistant surgeon with the 35th United States Colored Infantry Regiment. De Grasse served in New Bern, North Carolina, and Jacksonville, Florida. He was one of only eight Black surgeons to serve in the Union Army and the only one to serve in the field with his regiment. While on deployment in Florida, De Grasse was charged with "drunkenness on duty" and "conduct unbecoming an officer," court-martialed and convicted by an all-white jury of officers, and cashiered out of service on November 1, 1864. According to the Bay State Banner, these charges may have been "trumped up and racially motivated, as there was testimony suggesting that the allegations were baseless and a clear record of concerted hostility by white officers towards black officers, particularly black surgeons."

Massachusetts governor John Albion Andrew awarded de Grasse a gold-hilted sword in recognition of his military service.

== Death ==
After his discharge, de Grasse returned to Boston, where he died of unknown causes in 1868 and was buried at New York's Cypress Hill Cemetery.

== See also ==
- James McCune Smith
