= Catherine L. Ross =

US academic

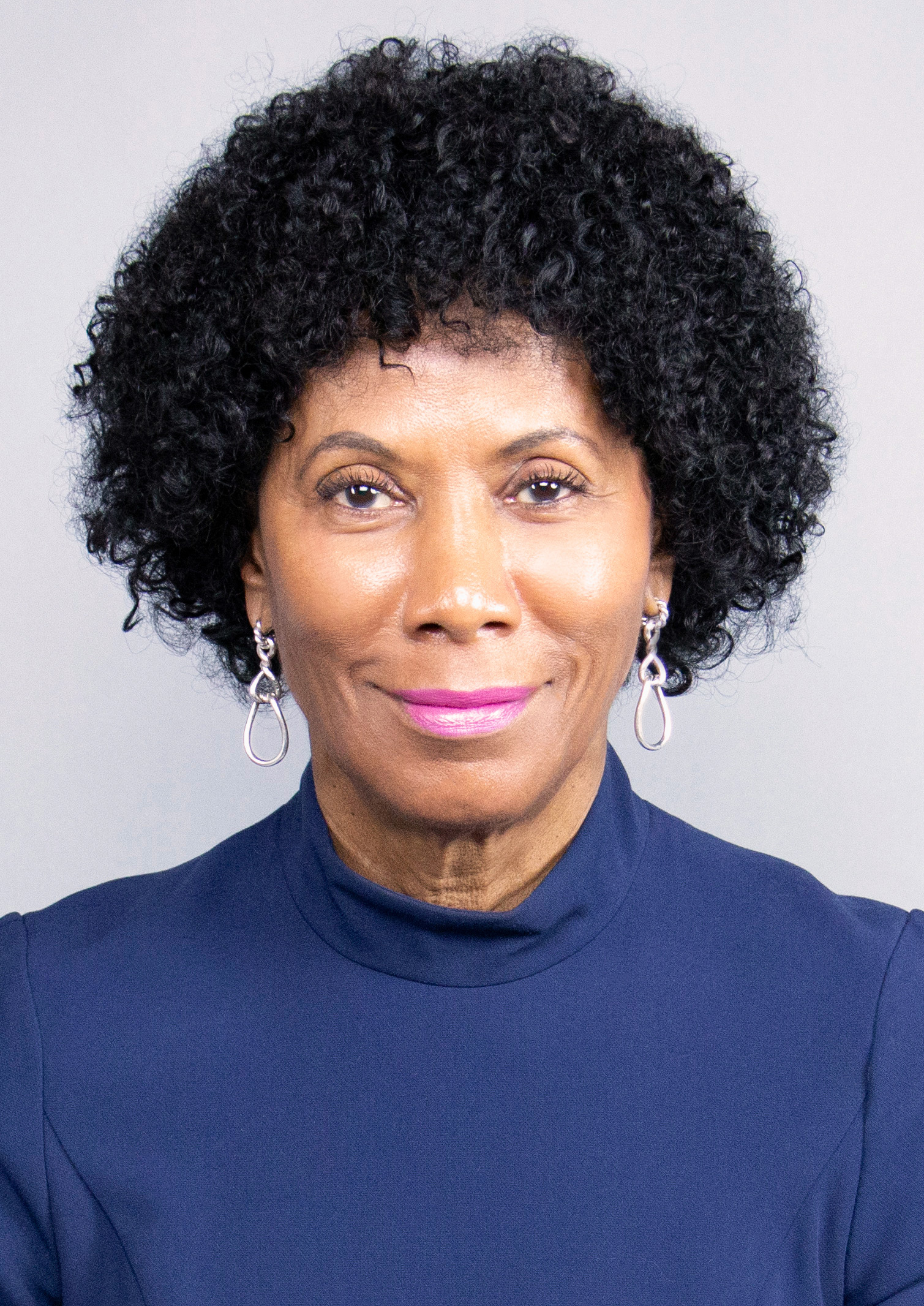
- Ross in 2021
- Occupations: Harry West Professor, Director of the Center for Quality Growth and Regional Development, and Deputy Director of the Center for Transportation System Productivity and Management at Georgia Institute of Technology
- Spouse: Thomas Boston

Academic background
- Education: Cornell University

Academic work
- Discipline: City and Regional Planning
- Sub-discipline: Transportation

Catherine L. Ross is an American educator and author. She is the Harry West Professor of City and Regional Planning, the director of the Center for Quality Growth and Regional Development, and the deputy director of the Center for Transportation System Productivity and Management at Georgia Institute of Technology.

== Early life and education ==
Ross was born and raised Cleveland, Ohio. In 1971, she completed a bachelor's degree at Kent State University, and in 1973 completed a master's degree in regional planning at Cornell University. In 1979, she completed a doctorate in city and regional planning at Cornell University. She completed post-doctorate work at the University of California, Berkeley.

== Career ==
In 1976, Ross began teaching at Georgia Tech as an assistant professor, and became a full professor in 1990. In 1999, she became the first executive director of the Georgia Regional Transportation Authority and served in this role for four years. She then became the director of the Center for Quality Growth and Regional Development at the College of Architecture at Georgia Tech in 2003.

Ross was a member of the Executive Committee of the National Academy of Sciences, Transportation Research Board, and on the board of the Eno Foundation and the Metropolitan Atlanta Rapid Transit Authority. She was a senior policy advisor for the Transportation Research Board of the National Academy of Sciences and was president of the National Association of Collegiate Schools of Planning. In July 2009, she was an advisor to the Obama administration on the creation of the White House Office of Urban Affairs.

At Georgia Tech, she is the Harry West Professor of City and Regional Planning, the director of the Center for Quality Growth and Regional Development, and the deputy director of the Center for Transportation System Productivity and Management. She is also a member of the National Academy of Public Administration (NAPA).

== Works ==
Ross is the editor of Megaregions: Planning for Global Competitiveness (2009) and co-editor of The Inner City: Urban Poverty and Economic Development in the Next Century (1997). She is a co-author of Health Impact Assessment in the United States (2014).

== Personal life ==
Ross is married to Dr. Thomas Boston. They have two children.
