= William N. Reed =

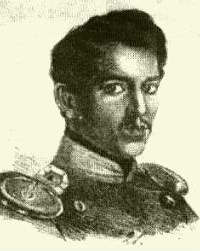
William N. Reed during his service in the Schleswig-Holstein Army

William Nikolaus Reed (May 30, 1824 – February 26, 1864) was a Danish-American military officer.

== Early life ==
William Nikolaus Reed was born on May 30, 1824, on the island of Saint Croix, part of the Danish West Indies. By his own account, his father was of English origin. (Note: According to historian Lorien Foote, Reed's father originated from Schleswig–Holstein.) Church records list his father as John N. Reed—a merchant—and his mother as Susanna Cooper. As other sources indicated that William was mixed-race or "mulatto", his mother was probably either mixed-race herself or of African slave origin. He was baptized on May 12, 1825. He later moved to Flensburg, a city in the Duchy of Schleswig, a largely-German speaking territory of the Kingdom of Denmark, probably at is father's wishes to pursue an education. He was confirmed in the city's St. Mary Church on April 17, 1840. Scholar Wolbert G. C. Smidt speculated that Reed arrived in Flensburg after 1829. He further speculated that Reed lived with the Elingaus family in the city. (Note: Smidt noted that Reed's only other confirmation classmate was a son of the Elingaus family of similar age. The Elingaus patriarch was a ship captain and merchant who engaged in commerce in the West Indies, thus possibly exposing him to Reed's father.) Reed later reported that in his youth he had learned to speak English, Danish, French, and German.

In 1844, Reed enrolled at Kiel University to study medicine and natural sciences. Two years later he changed his focus to study law. He enrolled in the student fraternity Corps Saxonia.

== First Schleswig War ==
Reed was preparing for his law examination when the First Schleswig War broke out in 1848. Like many law students in Kiel, he was sympathetic to Duchies of Schleswig's and Holstein's claims for autonomy from Denmark and closer alignment with the German Confederation. He joined the 5th Jaeger Corps of the Scheswig-Holstein Army as an officer candidate on March 25 and fought in the Battle of Bov in April. Reed was captured alongside many of his classmates and imprisoned aboard the HDMS Dronning Marie in Copenhagen harbor. The prisoners were permitted to sing and perform music to entertain themselves, and one of his comrades reported that Reed frequently sang solos.

Reed was released from captivity on September 2, 1848. He rejoined the Schleswig-Holstein Army as a senior ensign of the 3rd Jaeger Corps on October 18. He quickly rose through the ranks, becoming a second lieutenant on January 29, 1849. He was made an adjutant in the 1st Brigade on June 14, 1849. He as promoted to the rank of first lieutenant on October 29, 1849.

On December 9, 1848, Reed was challenged to duel after attempting to intervene in a drunken political dispute involving several officers, among whom some took exception to denigrating remarks he had made about the Danes. He initially accepted the challenge, but as the situation relaxed he and the challenging officer reached an understanding and apologized to one other.

Reed participated in the Battle of Kolding and was wounded.

== Exile, Platine War, and move to the United States ==
Despite initial successes, by 1851 the Schleswig–Holstein revolt had faltered and the duchies were reintegrated into the Kingdom of Denmark. Officers of the rebel army were subject to persecution and Reed was forced into exile. He briefly visited the Danish West Indies before being recruited—as many former Schleswig-Holstein rebels were—into the Army of the Empire of Brazil to fight in the Platine War. The war ended in February 1852 and he subsequently emigrated to New York City in the United States by 1853. The details of Reed's early years in the United States are unknown.

== American Civil War ==
In 1863, amidst the American Civil War, Union Army Brigadier General Edward A. Wild was given permission to recruit black soldiers among the freed slaves in the vicinity of Union-occupied city of New Bern, North Carolina. He directly oversaw the selection of officers in preparation for the raising of a black regiment, the 1st North Carolina Colored Volunteers, with 26 officers appointed on April 28, though the colonel and lieutenant colonel were not appointed until June 1. He had significant discretion in his choices and sought out candidates with military experience and political devotion to abolition and temperance. Wild appointed James Chaplin Beecher to serve as the new regiment's commander with the rank of colonel. Reed, favored for his abolitionist sentiments and previous military service, was made lieutenant colonel. While official U.S. Army policy at the time forbid the appointment of black officers, Reed nevertheless was allowed to assume the post. Official military records did not list him as colored though some of his contemporaries alluded to his mixed racial heritage. As such, Reed was the highest ranking colored officer to serve in the American Civil War.

In January 1864, Colonel Beecher left on leave and command of the regiment devolved to Reed. Upon assuming charge, he ordered his men to observe strict codes of discipline and order. On February 7, 1864, the regiment arrived in Jacksonville, Florida with two other federal regiments to serve as an expeditionary force under the command of Major General Quincy Adams Gillmore. The following day, the 1st North Carolina Colored Volunteers was reorganized as the 35th U.S. Colored Infantry, though the men of the regiment were slow to adjust to the new designation.

== Battle of Olustee and death ==
Reed led the regiment during its participation in the Battle of Olustee on February 20, 1864. Mortally wounded during the engagement, he died from his wounds on February 26, 1964. He was buried at the Beaufort National Cemetery. He was survived by his wife and five children.

== Works cited ==
- Foote, Lorien (2021). Rites of Retaliation : Civilization, Soldiers, and Campaigns in the American Civil War. Chapel Hill: The University of North Carolina Press. ISBN 9781469665283.
- Reid, Richard M. (2008). Freedom for Themselves: North Carolina's Black Soldiers in the Civil War Era. Chapel Hill: The University of North Carolina Press. ISBN 0-8078-3174-3.
- Smidt, Wolbert G. C. (2014). "Ein Afroamerikaner im Kampf gegen die Kolonialmacht Der Sklaven-Nachkomme und dänische Untertan Reed im Aufstand gegen Dänemark 1848-51" (PDF). Ethnorêma (in German) (14): 71–98. doi:10.23814/ethn.14.18.smi. Archived from the original (PDF) on February 9, 2019.
