= Isaiah DeGrasse =

American minister (1813–1841)

Isaiah George DeGrasse
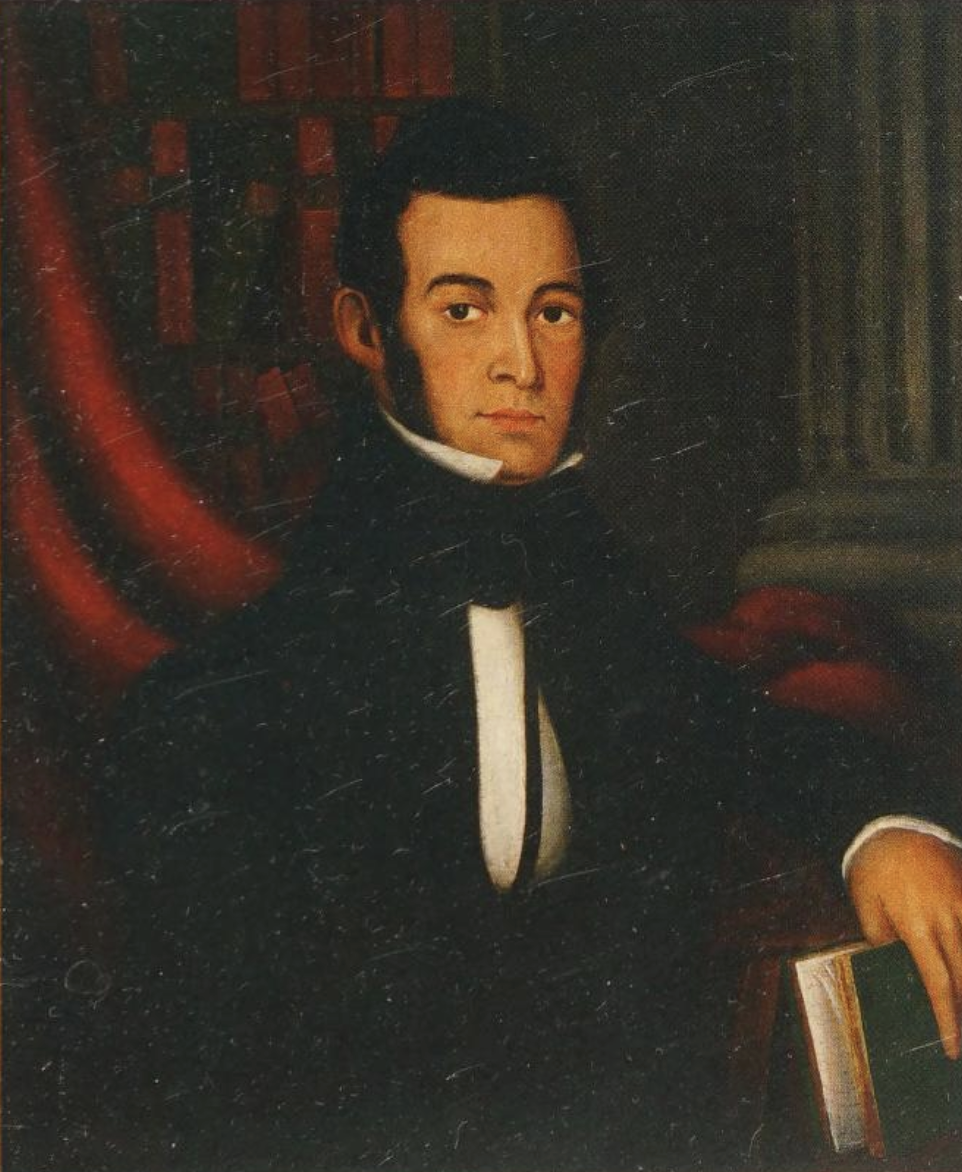
- Portrait by Patrick H. Reason circa 1840
- Born: July 19, 1813; New York City, U.S.
- Died: January 11, 1841 (aged 27); Kingston, Jamaica
- Education: University of Delaware, Hobart and William Smith Colleges
- Occupation: Minister
- Relatives: John van Salee de Grasse (brother), George T. Downing (brother-in-law), François Joseph Paul de Grasse (grandfather)

Isaiah George DeGrasse (July 19, 1813 – January 11, 1841) was an American minister in the Protestant Episcopal Church. In 1836, he was the first African American to graduate from the University of Delaware.

== Family ==
Born on July 19, 1813, in New York City, DeGrasse was a member of the affluent DeGrasse family. His biracial father, George deGrasse, was the presumed natural son of French admiral François Joseph Paul de Grasse. Isaiah's mother, Maria van Surlee, had African and Dutch heritage. His younger brother, John van Salee de Grasse, was a respected physician and member of the Massachusetts Medical Society. His sister, Serena, wed Black restaurateur and civil rights activist George T. Downing. Isaiah's complexion was comparatively fair and reportedly indistinguishable from the complexions of many white classmates.

== Education ==
Isaiah George DeGrasse attended the African Free School and attended Geneva College (now Hobart and William Smith Colleges) in upstate New York for three years. Although nearing completion of his studies, he transferred to the newly founded Newark College (now the University of Delaware) in Newark, Delaware. In 1836, he graduated after one semester, becoming one of the five members of the college's first graduating class. He was a member of the Delta Phi fraternity. DeGrasse went on to attend the all-white General Theological Seminary in New York City, where bishop Benjamin T. Onderdonk pressured him to withdraw from the seminary on account of his race. DeGrasse duly withdrew and pursued private tutelage.

DeGrasse was probably the first African American to receive a degree from any flagship public university in the United States. The University of Delaware's second Black alumnus was Elbert C. Wisner, who received his bachelor's degree in 1952—more than a century after DeGrasse's graduation.

== Ministry and death ==
DeGrasse's ambition was become a fully ordained minister in the Protestant Episcopal Church. On July 11, 1838, he was ordained a deacon at St. Philip's Episcopal Church in Manhattan. He was promptly assigned to work as a missionary among the predominantly Black communities of Jamaica, Newtown, and Flushing in the Queens borough of New York City. He also delivered sermons at Trinity Church in Manhattan and at Trinity Church in Newport, Rhode Island. Circa 1840, Patrick H. Reason painted DeGrasse's portrait, which is held in the collections of the Kenkeleba House.

DeGrasse spent his final days as a missionary in Kingston, Jamaica, where he contracted yellow fever and died on January 11, 1841, at the age of 27. His funeral in New York City featured massive turnout from white and black clergy and laypeople and a sermon by Bishop Onderdonk.
