= Jordan Winston Early =

American preacher and evangelist (1814–1903)

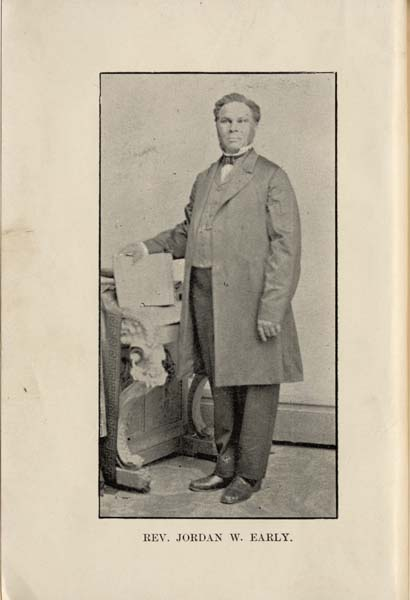
- Born: June 17, 1814; Franklin County, Virginia, U.S.
- Died: November 19, 1903 (aged 89)
- Occupation: Methodist preacher
- Known for: Pioneering of African-American Methodism in the United States
- Spouse(s): Louisa Carter (1843–1862; death), Sarah Jane Woodson Early (m. 1868–?)
- Children: 8

Jordan Winston Early (June 17, 1814 – November 19, 1903) was an American Methodist preacher who is considered to have contributed significantly to the spread of African American Methodism (working with the African Methodist Episcopal Church) in the southern and western United States. In 1868, he married Sarah Jane Woodson Early, and the couple were prominent in spreading Methodism and black nationalism, with his wife teaching wherever he preached.

== Early life ==
Early, a former slave, was born on June 17, 1814, in Franklin County, Virginia. After his mother's death, when Early was three, he and his siblings were cared for by a maternal aunt, an uncle who taught him astronomy, and an older woman on the plantation, known as "Aunt Milly". Sold separately from his parents, he became a minister at the age of 12.

== Career ==
Early and his family were taken by their enslavers to Missouri in 1826, where Early joined the Methodist Church and was emancipated in the same year. While working on a riverboat that plied the Mississippi between St. Louis and New Orleans, he was taught how to read and write by a Presbyterian minister and a shipmate. Joining the African Methodist Episcopal Church in 1832, Early worked to build more local congregations. In 1836, he was licensed as an AME preacher. He helped expand the church in St. Louis and New Orleans, and in Illinois, Indiana, and Tennessee. By 1838, he was ordained a deacon. In 1840, Early and other supporters built the first AME Church in St. Louis.

In 1843, he married Louisa Carter, and they had eight children, four of whom survived to adulthood. The Earlys sent their children to Wilberforce University. He became licensed as an exhorter in 1853.

In the late 1850s, Early evangelized in Tennessee and founded numerous AME missions in Missouri (including in Kirkwood, Saint Charles, Roche Port, Washington, Jefferson City, Louisiana, Booneville, Saint Joseph, and Weston). In 1853, Early founded the Olive Chapel African Methodist Episcopal Church congregation in Kirkwood, Missouri.

After Louisa died in 1862, Early married Sarah Jane Woodson Early on September 24, 1868. The couple were prominent in spreading Methodism and black nationalism; his wife taught wherever he preached, serving as a principal in four cities. Jordan Early and his wife Sarah retired to Nashville from active minister appointments in 1888. His wife wrote a biography of her husband and his rise from slavery that is included among postwar slave narratives.

== See also ==
- List of slaves
