= Thomas D. Boston =

Professor of economics

Thomas "Danny" Boston
- Born: circa 1948
- Spouse: Catherine L. Ross
- Children: 2

Academic background
- Education: Cornell University(MA), (PhD), 1976; West Virginia State University (BS), 1968

Academic work
- Discipline: Entrepreneurship; Management
- Institutions: Georgia Tech; Clark Atlanta University
- Website: https://iac.gatech.edu/people/person/thomas-boston

Thomas "Danny" Boston (circa 1948 - ) is an American economist who is professor emeritus of Economics and International Affairs in the Sam Nunn School of International Affairs at Georgia Tech. He is a past president of the National Economic Association.

== Education and early life ==
Boston grew up in segregated Jacksonville, Florida, where he participated as a child in the civil rights demonstrations attacked during Ax Handle Saturday. He attended West Virginia State University's ROTC program, graduating in 1968 as a commissioned Army officer. He received a Purple Heart for wounds received while serving as a reconnaissance platoon leader in Vietnam, and left the army with the rank of Captain. He was inducted into the West Virginia State University ROTC hall of fame in 1993. Following his army service, he earned graduate degrees in economics at Cornell University, where he met his wife, Catherine L. Ross.

== Career ==
Boston taught economics at Clark Atlanta University from 1976 to 1985, becoming chair of that economics department. He then taught at Georgia Institute of Technology from 1985 until his retirement in 2019. He was named the State of Georgia "Economics Educator of the Year." He is founder of the economic consulting company EuQuant, and was named "2016 Entrepreneur of the Year" by the Atlanta Business League.

=== Selected publications ===
- Boston, Thomas D. "Segmented labor markets: New evidence from a study of four race-gender groups." ILR Review 44, no. 1 (1990): 99–115.
- Boston, Thomas D. "The effects of revitalization on public housing residents: A case study of the Atlanta Housing Authority." Journal of the American Planning Association 71, no. 4 (2005): 393–407.
- Boston, Thomas D. Race, class and conservatism. Routledge, 2013.
- Boston, Thomas D. Affirmative action and black entrepreneurship. Routledge, 1998.
- Boston, Thomas D., and Linje R. Boston. "Secrets of gazelles: The differences between high-growth and low-growth business owned by African American entrepreneurs." The Annals of the American Academy of Political and Social Science 613, no. 1 (2007): 108–130.

=== External links ===
- 2008 interview with Boston
