= Kim Kelly (journalist) =

American journalist and writer

- Occupation: Journalist
- Notable work: Fight Like Hell: The Untold History of American Labor

Kim Kelly is an American journalist and writer, best known for her coverage of labor issues, and of heavy metal music.

== Early life ==
Kim Kelly was born in the Pine Barrens region of southern New Jersey. She was born with ectrodactyly, a congenital limb difference. Kelly grew up in a working class household with several generations having worked in the construction industry. She was active within the construction industry trade unions. Kelly is a third generation union member.

== Career ==
Kelly began her career in journalism covering music and culture, in particular the heavy metal music scene. She initially began writing for her school newspaper as a teenager, and eventually became editor for Vice Magazine's music and culture section. In 2015, she became one of the leaders of the successful unionization drive at Vice Media. She was laid off from Vice in 2019, as part of mass layoffs by the company.

Following the unionization drive, she began covering labor issues more frequently, including starting a regular column on labor for Teen Vogue in 2018.

Kelly is a member of the Industrial Workers of the World's Freelance Journalists Union. In 2021, she was elected to the council of the Writers Guild of America, East.

In April 2022, she released Fight Like Hell: The Untold History of American Labor, a non-fiction book covering the history of the American labor movement and of marginalized voices who have been overlooked in most narratives of the American labor movement.

Kelly has been published by the following publications: The New Republic, The Washington Post, The New York Times, The Baffler, The Nation, the Columbia Journalism Review, Esquire, and as Vice's music blog heavy metal editor. Kelly has also worked as a video correspondent for More Perfect Union, The Real News Network, and Means TV.

== Activism ==
Kelly was an anti-fascist counter-demonstrator at the Unite the Right rally in Charlottesville in 2017, with the Metropolitan Anarchist Coordinating Council. She has spoken out against Nazis within the metal community. She was a co-founder of the Black Flags Over Brooklyn anti-fascist music festival. Kelly's congenital condition ectrodactyly has led her to be a disability activist. She has worked to highlight the stories of those, who because of their own congenital issues, were mistreated in society. Three of those people figure in Kelly's book FIGHT LIKE HELL: The Untold History of American Labor they are: Julia Pastrana, William Henry Johnson, and Joice Heth.

In 2024, Kelly received the Debra E. Bernhardt Labor Journalism Prize from the New York Labor History Association.
