= Lewis Woodson =

American academic (1806–1878)

- Born: January 1806; Greenbrier County, Virginia (now West Virginia), U.S.
- Died: January 1878 (aged 71–72)
- Resting place: Allegheny Cemetery
- Occupations: Educator; minister; barber; writer; abolitionist
- Spouse: Caroline Robinson

Lewis Woodson (January 1806 – January 1878) was an American educator, minister, writer, and abolitionist. He was an early leader in the African Methodist Episcopal Church (AME) in Ohio and Pennsylvania. Woodson started and helped to build other institutions within the free African-American communities in Ohio and western Pennsylvania prior to the American Civil War.

Woodson was among the original 24 trustees to found Wilberforce University in Ohio in 1856, in a collaboration between the AME and the Cincinnati Methodist Council. When the college faced financial difficulties during the American Civil War, the AME Church bought it from the Methodist Church in 1863, making it the first historically black college to be owned and operated by African Americans.

== Early life ==
Lewis Woodson was the oldest of eleven children born to Thomas and Jemima Woodson. Both parents were mixed-race. Both parents had been born into slavery and both effectuated their freedom, Thomas while still a teenager. Lewis was born in January 1806 in Greenbrier County, Virginia (now part of West Virginia). According to oral history, Thomas left Monticello in his early teenage years. He became an orphan, but, fortunately, a free orphan. It is uncertain how and where he met Jemima. It is reasonable to think that had he married a girl younger than himself, say thirteen, the couple would have been unprepared to face the future. Jemima was older than Thomas and Jemima came with an unmarried mother, who, in a fashion, likely served as Thomas' surrogate mother. Jemima also had a resourceful older sister and with her a brother-in-law, Lewis Leach. Thomas and Jemima's first child, Lewis, was named after his uncle.

Woodson family oral history, dating to the early nineteenth century, has claimed that Thomas Woodson was the eldest child of Sally Hemings and her master President Thomas Jefferson. That account has been disputed by Jeffersonian historians.

In addition, results of a 1998 Jefferson DNA study conclusively showed that there was no genetic link between the Jefferson male line and the Woodson male line. The study's major findings were that the Y chromosome of the Jefferson male line matched that of Sally Hemings' son Eston's descendant. The Woodson Y chromosome did show Rb1 northern European ancestry.

The Jefferson family Y chromosome did reveal a K2 haplogroup rare in Britain and more common in eastern Africa and the Middle East. The 1998 DNA report was inconclusive, unethical, unobjective, and unscientific. It was inconclusive because Thomas Jefferson's DNA was not used. It was unethical because DNA donors were promised that historians would be kept far away from the project. In contrast Joseph Ellis and Annette Gordon-Reed went on PBS News Hour to announce the results (not Dr. Foster). Foster objected to the manner in which results were released and wrote New York Times in protest. NYT printed Foster's letter. It was unobjective also because Ellis and other historians who had mishandled the historical evidence were in control of the release of the DNA report. PBS News Hour 11/02/1998. Unscientific because genetic data cannot solve a historical and genealogical matter through six generations on its own.

== Move to Ohio and later to Pittsburgh ==
The Woodson family moved from Virginia to Chillicothe, Ohio about 1821. Chillicothe had a strong community of numerous free blacks; it was a center of abolitionist activity. Soon the Woodsons helped establish an African Methodist Episcopal congregation there, the first west of the Allegheny Mountains.

In 1829 Thomas Woodson acquired a 50-acre farm in Jackson County, Ohio, which he grew over time to 382 acres. He had a large herd of cattle (400), hogs (150), and "fine horses." He must have come to Ohio with a stake, otherwise he is made out to be a genius or a miracle worker; he was neither. Nor did he win the lottery or inherit money, while living as an orphan. The best speculation is that the Hemings family 'misappropriated' cattle and horses from Jefferson's Bedford plantation (near Lynchburg), taking them to Greenbrier County and Thomas skillfully grew a herd from there. The word Jefferson used for unsanctioned liberties taken by the Hemings family was 'mismanagement.' Lewis Woodson moved with his wife and children to Pittsburgh in 1830/31. He remained connected to his family in Ohio.

Lewis and two brothers, Thomas and John, became ministers in the African Methodist Episcopal Church (AME), a new, independent, African-American denomination started in Philadelphia in 1816. The Woodsons helped establish new congregations in what was then thought of as the western United States.

== Marriage and family ==
In Chillicothe, Lewis Woodson married Caroline Robinson, also born in Virginia. The Woodsons had ten surviving children, many of whom followed their models in gaining education and contributing to their communities. One of the ten Woodson children married a member of the Tanner family and another married a member of the Highgate family, who had lived in Pennsylvania since well before the American Revolution as free black Americans.

A son of Lewis and Caroline Woodson, Granville S. Woodson served on the executive committee of the National Equal Rights League. Their grandson George Frederick Woodson earned degrees from Drew University and Morris Brown University. He served as Dean of the Payne Theological Seminary at Wilberforce for over three decades, ending in 1937. Their grandson Howard D. Woodson earned a degree in civil engineering from what is now the University of Pittsburgh in 1899. He contributed to the design of Union Station in Washington, D.C., and also became a civic activist. H.D. Woodson High School is named in his honor.

Greenwood-Praeger published a highly acclaimed non-fiction best seller in 2001, written by a great-great-grandson of Lewis and Carline Woodson. C- Span aired this video of one of the author's presentations. The book covered Woodson family genealogy and history. https://www.c-span.org/video/?165070-1/a-president-family

A great-great-great-grandson of Lewis and Carline Woodson, Timothy K. Lewis, became a United States District Judge in Pittsburgh in 1991 and became a United States Circuit Judge in 1992.

== AME conferences ==
Freedom's Journal, was the first widely distributed black American newspaper. It operated for only two years March 1827 to March 1829. The newspaper printed one letter each from Richard Allen, founder of the African Methodist Episcopal church, and Rev. Lewis Woodson of the same denomination. Both letters denounced proposals for expatriation or removal of black Americans to Africa, as supported by the American Colonization Society. Woodson advocated colonization in separate black communities in the United States as an alternative.

Reverend Lewis Woodson served as secretary for an AME Conference in Hillsborough, Ohio (near Cincinnati) while Bishop Morris Brown presided. The riots of 1829 in Cincinnati had driven out much of the African-American population. Labor competition had led to whites' attacking blacks, who had been establishing a thriving free black community. Nearly 1200 blacks left Cincinnati for Canada as a result.

In Pittsburgh, Woodson joined with John B. Vashon to establish the African Education Society. One of the students in Woodson's school was George Boyer Vashon, who was taught by Woodson until black students were allowed to attend publicly financed schools. George Vashon was the first African American to graduate from Oberlin College. Oberlin graduated 23 blacks before the Civil War, making a significant contribution to the uplift of the Antebellum African American community. Martin Delany was also one of Woodson's students. Woodsn's one teacher school was one of the first to be operated by an African American.

As Secretary to the AME Ohio Conference of 1833, Woodson advanced a resolution urging the AME to establish or assist "...common schools, Sunday Schools and temperance societies..." It was the first such resolution to urge the AME denomination to support education. Lewis Woodson filled a key role in the establishment of the Third, or Ohio District, of the AME denomination. The AME Church founded Union Seminary near Columbus, Ohio in 1847.

A few years after arriving in Pittsburgh, Lewis Woodson opened a barbershop. He operated the business at the same time he pursued his ministry and major civic interests. Vashon and Woodson befriended the young Martin Delany, and acted as his teachers and mentors. Delany became a spokesman for blacks during the Civil War and helped them to be accepted as soldiers on the Union side.

In 1837 Lewis Woodson served as secretary for a group of African Americans who created the "Pittsburgh Memorial", a document asserting that free blacks should retain the voting right in Pennsylvania. Following Nat Turner's Rebellion in 1831 in Virginia and the growth of the free population in Pennsylvania, fears contributed to support among whites to restrict the rights of free blacks. While the legislature deprived free blacks of the right to vote in the Commonwealth for some years, Woodson was instrumental in securing public funding for black education. He joined the Western District of the Pennsylvania Anti-Slavery Society and worked for abolition.

== "Augustine" and the Father of Black nationalism ==
The historian Floyd Miller documented that Woodson wrote under the pen name "Augustine" (the name of an early Christian bishop and theologian from north Africa, who is honored as a saint in the Catholic Church). Miller suggested that in this role, Woodson could be called the "Father of Black Nationalism". From 1837 to 1841, Woodson published numerous letters as "Augustine" in The Colored American (New York City) newspaper. He advocated black initiatives to create institutions independent of whites, including churches, newspapers, and schools. Woodson advocated preparation for the time when the multitudes of American slaves would gain freedom, and require social, organizational, and other assistance.

Woodson attended and organized national and state conventions of black American abolitionists. He attended at least one national convention and spoke there. He helped to organize and lead conventions targeted toward Pennsylvania. One such convention took place in Pittsburgh in August 1841. John B. Vashon and Rev. Samuel Williams also served on the organizing committee for that convention. Woodson also served as one of the secretaries for that convention. He attended conventions where black and white abolitionists gathered, including one in Cincinnati in 1850.

Lewis Woodson engaged in debates and ideological clashes with other black American leaders. Woodson joined the American Moral Reform Society (AMRS), but his contribution was that of dissent. AMRS leader William Whipper vehemently opposed the naming of and constitution of organizations and churches on the basis of color and race. Whipper, for instance, did not approve of the African Methodist Episcopal Church, the church to which Reverend Woodson was attached. The letters Woodson wrote to the Colored American newspaper were, in part, meant to oppose Whipper's views. Woodson clashed with Frederick Douglass because of Woodson's opposition to Garrisonism. Douglass sent a scathing letter to The Anti-Slavery Bugle wherein Douglass likened Woodson to "Judas Iscariot." The letter was written before Douglass' split with William Lloyd Garrison was complete. Said another way, after the Douglass/Woodson clash, Douglass' stance came closer to Woodson's (not directly as result of the clash).

David Walker's Appeal is a maze of sometimes conflicting ideological statements. Douglass not only started his own newspaper, but changed his stance and split away for Garrison's ideology. Delany promoted the emigration of black Americans, but did not himself emigrate. Part of Woodson's mark is that he was unwavering; the ideological stances he adopted over 40 years of activism did not change. Woodson never called for a slave uprising, he never supported black American emigration to Africa, and he never supported Garrisonism. It would be a stretch, of course, to claim that the black American ethnicity followed Woodson, directly, even though his stance and the collective paths of the majority of black Americans was, over time, consistent.

== Resilience on Public Display ==
In 1838 a new Pennsylvania Constitution was adopted, which took the voting right away from black Pennsylvanians. This was a hard blow to their status as citizens. In the summer of 1851, the leaders of the black community of Pittsburgh organized a celebration of the "Emancipation of 800,000 slaves in the West Indies." The event took place in a 'grove.' The newspaper advertisement for the celebration announced Rev. Lewis Woodson as the Orator of the Day and at the close of the advertisement tempted readers, "Come one, come all, and hear the greatest orator of the age."

The black community of Pittsburgh was putting its pride, resilience, and anti-slavery stance on full public display. The President of the Day was Rev. John Peck; Vice Presidents were J. B. Vashon, Hugh Tanner, and others.

In the 1870s two of the sons of Lewis Woodson, with many others, organized celebrations for the 13th Amendment and the 15th Amendment of the U. S. Constitution, separately. The leadership of Woodson, Vashon, Peck, and Delany set a template that was replicated for decades in Pittsburgh.

== Establishing Wilberforce University ==
Along with Bishop Daniel Payne, Woodson was among the four black Americans representing the AME Church; when the 24-member founding Board of Trustees of Wilberforce University first convened in Ohio. They created a collaborative venture with white representatives of the Cincinnati Conference of the Methodist Episcopal Church, which provided the first major funding. The university was opened in 1856 to provide collegiate education to African Americans. Among the trustees was Salmon P. Chase, a strong supporter of abolition and then Governor of Ohio. The AME representatives were the first African Americans to participate in establishing a historically black college. (The first college for black students, now Lincoln University, was established by Presbyterians, who were aligned with the goals of the American Colonization Society, in Pennsylvania in 1854. No African Americans participated in its founding.)

In 1858 Woodson's youngest sister, (see) Sarah Jane Woodson, a graduate of Oberlin College in Ohio, was hired as an instructor at Wilberforce. She became the first black American woman to teach at any college and the first black American to teach at an historically black college or university.

The outbreak of the American Civil War cut off paying students from the South, who had comprised a majority of the 200 students at Wilberforce. Most were mixed race; their tuition was paid by their wealthy white planter fathers. The war also diverted Methodist Church resources, and it was unable to fully fund the school. In 1862 the Board of Trustees temporarily closed Wilberforce University because of financial problems.

In 1863 the AME Church purchased the university and assumed full responsibility for it. They selected Bishop Daniel Payne as president, the first African-American college president in the United States. To help raise money for the purchase, the AME Church sold the property used by Union Seminary to put its resources into Wilberforce University.

== Death, legacy and honors ==
Lewis Woodson died in January 1878. He was buried in the Allegheny Cemetery in Pittsburgh, Pennsylvania. Caroline Woodson, who died after her husband, is buried next to him. The Pittsburgh Dispatch newspaper printed an obituary for Caroline "Slave" Woodson in 1892. To the contrary, Caroline was the daughter of Joe Robinson, a free man of color, who was named and enumerated in the 1810 U S census for Virginia and the 1830 U S census for Ross County, Ohio, as such. (The names of slaves never appeared in the U.S. census. Caroline's name did not appear there, but she was enumerated as a daughter. The U. S. census began to reveal the names of children in 1850.)

One of his obituaries reported his work on the Underground Railroad. Wilberforce University has a strong tradition of teaching the history of its establishment, including the contributions of Lewis Woodson and Daniel A. Payne. The John Heinz History Center in Pittsburgh has, since its inception, included the contributions of John B. Vashon, Lewis Woodson and Martin Delany in its exhibition.

Unlike Richard Allen, Frederick Douglass, John Mercer Langston, and Benjamin Tucker Tanner, Woodson did not write an autobiography, consequently no historian has written Woodson's biography (2024), as historians have in the cases of the four men mentioned. Not only did Woodson not make the effort to write an autobiography, he rebuffed at least one effort to record the story of his life. Benjamin Tucker Tanner approached Woodson with the intention of including a 'sketch' in a book that Tanner wrote. Bishop Tanner knew Woodson extremely well; he had been Woodson's pupil and one of his sisters had married one of Woodson's sons. Tanner could have assembled the necessary information without Woodson, but likely thought that he had received a clear message from Woodson's rebuff. Tanner reported the rebuff, reported some advice that Woodson imparted, and acclaimed Woodson as an "intelligent man."
