= Hester Lane =

American abolitionist

Hester Lane (died 1849) was an American abolitionist, philanthropist, entrepreneur, and political activist. Born into slavery in Maryland, she settled down in New York as a free woman. Lane was known in New York for her approach to adding color pigment to walls using whitewash, freeing slaves in Maryland through purchasing them, and the controversy surrounding her failed nomination to the American Anti-Slavery Society. She died in July 1849 during the cholera pandemic.

== Entrepreneurship ==
Lane was a self-made woman. She created, managed, and ran her own business as a whitewasher, or "decorator," and also taught herself French. In 1830, the Federal Census listed her as a "Free Black Head of Household." After meeting Lane in 1833, British writer Edward Strutt Abdy claimed "she had obtained a comfortable competency for herself."

== Buying freedom ==
Lane not only owned her own home, but through money earned from her business, was able to buy the freedom of others utilizing the ability to enter and exit the South without arising suspicion. By the 1820s, her wealth granted her the ability to buy the freedom of at least eleven people, including entire families. Lane did not just buy the freedom of others, however, she expected those she helped to pay her back when able. She remained active in some of lives of those she liberated and helped provide access to education to the children she freed.

== Anti-slavery activism ==
Lane led fundraisers for the New York Committee of Vigilance, an abolitionist group of which she was a member of. She worked alongside David Ruggles in fundraising for William Lloyd Garrison's abolitionist newspaper The Liberator. Lane also served alongside Henrietta Ray, Charles Ray's wife, on the board of managers for the African Dorcas Association, a community aid society in New York. She also helped in organizing fairs for churches, including Philadelphia's Second African Presbyterian.

=== Rejected nomination ===
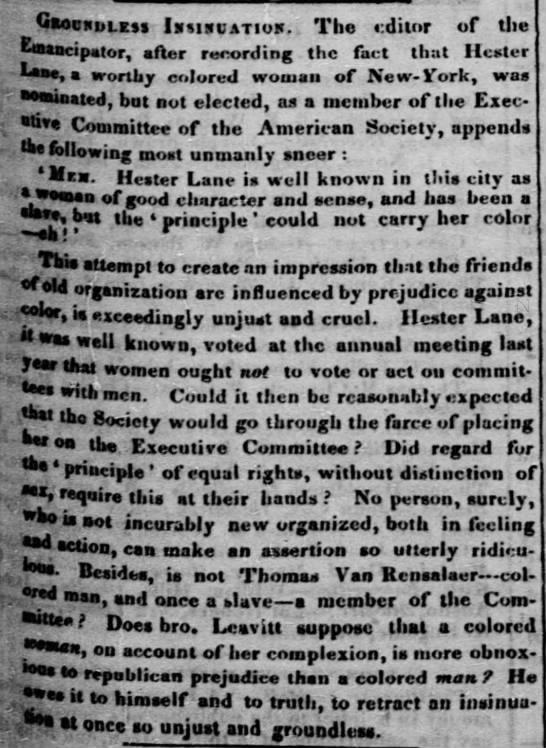
The Liberator. Vol. X. No. 22 (May 29, 1840)

As a result of internal conflict in May 1840, supporters of Garrison cemented their control of the American Anti-Slavery Society (AASS) after the "new organizationists" defected and formed the American and Foreign Anti-Slavery Society (AFASS). The "new organizationists" defection created space for women's leadership in the AASS. Charles Ray nominated Lane, a friend of his wife, for the executive committee of the AASS. Although David Lee Child stated that all those in the society enjoyed equal rights "in the Antislavery ranks, without distinctions of sex or color," and that the society's "practice was consistent with its theory," the group rejected Lane's nomination and instead nominated three white women: Maria Chapman, Lydia Maria Child, and Lucretia Mott. There was much controversy surrounding her rejected nomination. When reporting on the meeting in The Colored American, Ray blamed racism for the final decision:

"He [David Lee Child] therefore nominated Lucretia Mott, of Philadelphia, as a member of the Executive Committee—carried. . . . Charles Ray, then moved, as there was still one vacancy in the committee, that the name of Hester Lane be added—lost. Hester Lane is well known in this city has a woman of good character and senses, and has been a slave, but the 'principle' could not carry her color. —eh!"

Thomas Van Rensselaer, an African American restaurateur, Vigilance Committee activist, and newspaper editor, who was newly approved to the executive committee, rejected Ray's notion that racism was at fault and stated her nomination had been "withdrawn by us, rather reluctantly, by persuasion." Rensselaer justified his action by stating Lane supported Arthur Tappan's faction in a letter to The Emancipator:

"Hester Lane – an outcry has been made about this individual, being rejected as a member of the Executive Committee of the National Society. . . . Reasons for objecting, because I had a conversation with Mrs. Lane a few days before on the woman question, and found her opposed to us, and strongly in favor of the new organizationists [AFASS]. With those facts before my mind . . . I rose and said the committee was full, although it was found afterwards that another person could have been constitutionally added, so that all the blame, if blame there is, ought to be attached to brother Ray, for nominating a person who he knew, or ought to have known, was opposed to us."

In her books Vanguard: How Black Women Broke Barriers, Won the Vote, and Insisted on Equality for All and All Bound Up Together: The Woman Question in African American Public Culture, 1830-1900, historian and legal scholar Martha S. Jones discusses how Lane's case illustrates the debate among antislavery activists over women's rights, "one of which women's equality lost out to the color line."

== False accusations ==
In January 1838, Lane was investigated by a "Committee of Investigation" led by Samuel Hardenburgh for accusations by Martha Johnson stating she had kidnapped and sold slaves. Hardenburgh met at David Ruggles' home to investigate the accusations. Johnson reportedly had a conflict with Lane regarding property she was renting from Lane. In February 1839, at the Ashbury Church, the Investigative Committee announced their ruling in favor of Lane and exonerated her of the charges.

Following her acquittal, people pursued her under the impression she amassed her fortune from the illicit activities she was accused of and they argued over her innocence outside of the police station. Reportedly, the crowd wanted to lynch her but were discouraged from doing so by the arrival of an armed militia returning from their drills and dispersed shortly after.

On February 10, 1838, the committee published their report and announced Lane's innocence in The Colored American.

== Later life and death ==
Shortly after the events of 1840 and the controversy surrounding her nomination, Lane left the antislavery scene. She subsequently died in 1849 from cholera during the epidemic.
