= Edward Jones (missionary) =

American missionary (1807–1865)

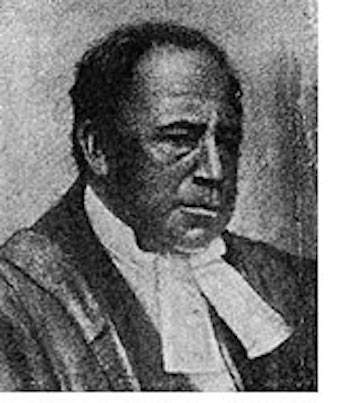
- an engraved portrait of Jones, 1850
- Born: 1807; Charleston, South Carolina, U.S.
- Died: 1865 (aged 57–58); England
- Education: Amherst College
- Occupation: Missionary
- Known for: First naturalized citizen of Sierra Leone
- Relatives: Jehu Jones (brother)

Edward Jones (1807–1865) was an African-American missionary to the colony of Sierra Leone. Jones was a prominent missionary and figure in the colony of Sierra Leone; he was the first naturalized citizen of Sierra Leone (though he retained his American citizenship). Jones was the first black principal of Fourah Bay College and held the post for 15 years. He was the first Black American to graduate from Amherst College in Massachusetts. Edward Jones was the brother of Jehu Jones, a prominent African-American preacher.

== Early life ==
Edward Jones was born in Charleston, South Carolina, and became part of the mulatto elite of that majority African-American city. Many free mulattoes were freed slaves who had fought in the American Revolutionary War for the Patriots and then freed for their loyalty. Edward Jones's father, Jehu Jones, in 1798, had bought his freedom for $140 (~$2,710 in 2025) from his owner, a tailor who had taught him the craft, and also bought freedom for his wife Abigail and children. Jones Sr. became wealthy from his investments in real estate and eventually a hotel owner catering to white travelers. He bought his first slave in 1807, although William Cooper Nell claimed that this was a legal action in order to give the slaves their freedom. According to historian Bernard E. Powers, the senior Jones associated himself with elite white Charlestonians and "seldom kept the company of even light-complexioned free blacks and never of slaves." Nonetheless, Edward Jones was proud of his African heritage, and was a member of the Brown Fellowship Society in Charleston.

During his time at Amherst, Jones was involved in the first African-American newspaper, Freedom's Journal, with John Brown Russwurm and Samuel Cornish.

== Immigration to Liberia ==
After his time at Amherst, Jones planned to go to Liberia as a doctor; however, a reference from a faculty member ended that plan.

In February 1829, he joined the Andover Theological Seminary and the African Mission School in Hartford which was run by the Episcopal Church; eighteen months later he was ordained as a priest.

Jones immigrated to Liberia but did not stay long before immigrating to the colony of Freetown, Sierra Leone.

== Life in Sierra Leone ==
It is in Sierra Leone that Jones is most remembered as a great leader and one of the patriarchs of a prominent Krio family. Jones was a superintendent of the liberated African village of Kent in Sierra Leone, and it was there he met one of the Nova Scotian settlers, Hannah Nylander, and married her. Jones had married into another prominent family; his wife was of half Nova Scotian (Black Loyalist descent, making her ultimately of Black American descent) and half German through her missionary father, Gustav Nyländer. In all, Jones married three times and buried all of his wives in Sierra Leone. Jones also fathered six children, only one whom lived to adulthood.

Jones was also the first principal of the newly established Fourah Bay College in Fourah Bay, Sierra Leone (a suburb of Freetown). It was there that the only known portrait of Edward Jones was hung on the wall. Jones died in England in 1865.

== See also ==
- List of African-American pioneers in desegregation of higher education
- Alexander Twilight – first known African-American graduate from a U.S. college

== Sources ==
- Anderson, Gerald H (1999). Biographical Dictionary of Christian Missions. Wm. B. Eerdmans Publishing. p. 340. ISBN 0-8028-4680-7.
- "Edward Jones: An African American in Sierra Leone", in Moving On: Black Loyalists in the Afro-Atlantic World, by Nemata Blyden.
