= Charlotte E. Ray =

American lawyer (1850–1911)

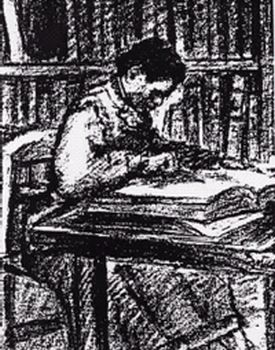
- Born: January 13, 1850; New York City, New York, U.S.
- Died: January 4, 1911 (aged 60); Woodside, Long Island, U.S.
- Other name: Charlotte E. Fraim
- Education: Howard University, University of the District of Columbia
- Occupations: Attorney, Teacher
- Movement: Colored Conventions Movement
- Parents: Rev. Charles Bennett Ray (father); Charlotte Augusta Burroughs (mother)

Charlotte E. Ray (January 13, 1850 – January 4, 1911) was an African-American lawyer. She was the first Black American woman to become a lawyer in the United States. Ray graduated from Howard University School of Law in 1872. She was also the first female admitted to the District of Columbia Bar, and the first woman admitted to practice before the Supreme Court of the District of Columbia. Her admission was used as a precedent by women in other states who sought admission to the bar.

Ray opened her own law office in Washington, D.C., advertising in a newspaper run by Frederick Douglass. However, she practiced law for only a few years because prejudice against African Americans and women made her business unsustainable. Ray eventually moved to New York, where she became a teacher in Brooklyn. She was involved in the women's suffrage movement and joined the National Association of Colored Women.

== Early life ==
Charlotte Ray was born in New York City to Charlotte Augusta Burroughs and Reverend Charles Bennett Ray. Reverend Ray was an important figure in the abolitionist movement and edited a newspaper called The Colored American. Charlotte had six siblings, including two sisters, Henrietta Cordelia and Florence. Education was important to her father, who made sure each of his girls went to college. Charlotte attended a school called the Institution for the Education of Colored Youth (now known as University of the District of Columbia) in Washington, D.C., graduating in 1869. It was one of a few places where a black woman could gain proper education.

After this Ray became a teacher at Howard University in the Normal and Preparatory Department, which was the University's Prep School. While teaching at Howard, she registered in the Law Department, as C. E. Ray. Charlotte Ray graduated on February 27, 1872, completing a three-year program, as the first woman to graduate from the Howard University School of Law. Sources claim she graduated Phi Beta Kappa, but Howard University did not receive its Phi Beta Kappa chapter until 1953.

While in law school she is believed to have specialized in corporate law. She has been identified as the woman referred to by General O. O. Howard, the founder and first president of Howard University, as having "read us a thesis on corporations, not copied from the books but from her brain, a clear incisive analysis of one of the most delicate legal questions." Others suggest that Mary Ann Shadd Cary was the person in question.

== Admission controversy ==
She was admitted to the Howard School of Law in the District of Columbia in 1872 because she applied under the name "C. E. Ray" and that Ray used an alternate name to disguise her gender so that her admission would not be instantly revoked. According to others, her use of initials is not proven, and it would not have been needed, because Howard University at this time had a clearly articulated policy of acceptance of both Black men and women.

== Independent practice ==
Ray was admitted to the District of Columbia Bar on March 2, 1872, and admitted to practice in the Supreme Court of the District of Columbia on April 23, 1872. Her appointment was noted in the Woman's Journal and gained her inclusion as one of the Women of the Century. Ray began her independent practice of commercial law in 1872, advertising in newspapers such as the New National Era and Citizen, owned by Frederick Douglass. Some sources suggest that she hoped to specialize in real estate law, which would involve fewer appearances in court.

Nonetheless, there is evidence that she was active in court. She was the first woman to practice and argue in the District of Columbia Supreme Court, where she pleaded the case of Gadley v. Gadley (vt. Godling v. Godling), No. 4278, filed June 3, 1875. In this case, she defended an uneducated woman petitioning for divorce from an abusive husband. The arguments were based on the grounds of "habitual drunkenness" and "cruelty of treatment, endangering the life or health of the party complaining". Ray's petition vividly evokes the violence of the marriage, describing an incident in which the husband first broke the bedstead, so that the wife lay down on the floor, and then "went down stairs, got an ax and returning, ripped up the planks in the floor", with the intention of causing his wife to fall through and break her neck.

Charlotte Ray was said to be eloquent, authoritative, and "one of the best lawyers on corporations in the country." Yet despite her Howard connections and advertisements, she was unable to maintain a steady client flow, sufficient to support herself. Regardless of her legal knowledge and corporate law expertise, not enough people were willing to trust a black woman with their cases. Wisconsin lawyer Kate Kane Rossi, in 1897, recalled that "Miss Ray … although a lawyer of decided ability, on account of prejudice was not able to obtain sufficient legal business and had to give up … active practice." Instead she returned to teaching, working in the Brooklyn school system.

== Personal life ==
Poet Henrietta Cordelia Ray was her sister. At one point all three sisters were teachers. Charlotte gave up teaching for a period to practice law, and Henrietta Cordelia gave up teaching to obtain her masters and write poetry.

Ray attended the National Woman Suffrage Association's New York convention in 1876. After 1895 Ray seems to have been active in the National Association of Colored Women.

She married in the late 1880s and became Charlotte E. Fraim.

In 1897 she moved to Woodside, Long Island, where she died of a severe case of bronchitis at the age of 60 on January 4, 1911.

== Posthumous honors ==
In March 2006, the Northeastern University School of Law (Boston, MA) chapter of Phi Alpha Delta Law Fraternity International chose to honor Ray by naming their newly chartered chapter after her, in recognition of her place as the first female African-American attorney.

== See also ==
- Macon Bolling Allen is believed to be both the first black man licensed to practice law and to hold a judicial position in the United States.
- Jane Bolin was both the first black woman to graduate from Yale Law School and serve as a judge in the United States.
- Thurgood Marshall was the first black Associate Justice of the U.S. Supreme Court.
- George Lewis Ruffin was both the first black man to earn a degree from Harvard Law School and become Massachusetts first African American judge.
- List of first women lawyers and judges in the United States
- Black women in American law
