= Liberia Herald =

Liberian newspaper

The Liberia Herald, founded in 1826 is the first newspaper ever published in Liberia which at the time was a colony. It was founded by Charles Force who died shortly after the first issue was published.

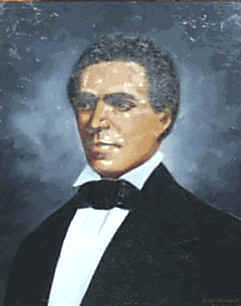
John Brown Russwurm editor from 1830 to 1834

In March 1827 Samuel Cornish and John B. Russwurm founded Freedom's Journal, the first African American newspaper in New York, as co-editors. In 1829 Russwurm resigned and emigrated to Liberia under the auspices of the American Colonization Society, there founding the Liberia Herald. From 1830 to 1834, the chief editor of the Liberia Herald was a Jamaican-born mulatto educated in Canada, John Brown Russwurm. He resigned in early 1835.

The Liberian National Museum in Monrovia is in possession of some of the earliest editorials of The Herald.

== See also ==
- List of newspapers in Liberia
