= African-American women in the legal profession =

African-American women have played a critical yet underrecognized role in the development of the U.S. legal system as lawyers, judges, activists, and legal scholars. The history of African-American women in the legal profession began in the late nineteenth century with pioneers such as Charlotte E. Ray, the first African-American woman to graduate from an American law school and become a lawyer. She was followed by women like Jane Bolin, who became America's first African-American female judge in 1932.

Throughout the twentieth century, African-American woman lawyers became key stakeholders in the Civil Rights Movement. Attorneys like Constance Baker Motley, and Frankie Freeman litigated landmark cases against discrimination. Towards the end of the century, legal scholars like Kimberlé Crenshaw developed the legal framework of intersectionality to describe the specific oppression of black women.

Although there have been achievements and breakthroughs of African-American women in the legal profession, there are still significant barriers that limit representation today. Scholars such as Carla Pratt have noted that Black women in law often face "intersectional barriers” that combine racial and gender discrimination, influencing hiring, promotion, and retention within law firms. As of 2022, fewer than 2% of all federal judges in U.S. history have been Black women, and Black women account for roughly 5% of practicing lawyers nationwide. To fight against discrimination, Black women lawyers have founded numerous advocacy organizations. For example, the Black Women Lawyers’ Association of Greater Chicago was formed in 1977. It primarily funds scholarships for Black female law students. Despite the barriers faced by African-American women lawyers, women like Ketanji Brown Jackson who became the first African-American woman appointed to the Supreme Court in 2022, reflect the persistent efforts fo African-American women to overcome and progress.

== History ==
=== 1870s–1930s ===
Howard University opened in 1869, and it was the first law school in the United States to open admissions to both male and female applicants. The first Black female lawyer in the United States was Charlotte E. Ray. She attended Howard University, becoming the first Black woman to graduate from an American law school in 1872. Ray was followed by former anti-slavery activist Mary Ann Shadd Cary, who graduated from Howard in 1883. Both women set up law practices in Washington DC, but their businesses did not survive long. The belief that Black women were unqualified to be lawyers was the general attitude of the time. The principal challenge for Black women lawyers of this period was entering the profession. Despite discrimination that they faced, more Black women began to enter the field. Violette Neatley Anderson and Edith Sampson both focused their careers on helping impoverished Black people in Chicago. Ida Platt was the first Black woman admitted to the bar in the state of Illinois in 1894. Her experience differed from other Black women lawyers because she was white-passing. In 1897, Lutie Lytle became the first Black woman faculty member of a law school when she joined Central Tennessee College. In 1926, Clara Burrill Bruce became the first Black editor-in-chief of the Boston University Law Review. In 1927, Sadie Tanner Mossell Alexander became first Black woman to receive a law degree from the University of Pennsylvania Law School. She went on to become the first Black woman to practice law in Pennsylvania. Jane Bolin became the first Black woman judge in the United States in 1939.

=== 1940s–early 1960s ===
With the onset of World War II, more Black women gained the opportunity to attend law school. They filled the vacancies of men who went off to fight in the war. This contributed to a surge in degrees received by Black women in the late 1940s and early 1950s. From 1952 to 1953, Black women received 62.4% of all degrees from historically Black colleges and institutions. New Black women lawyers entered the profession as the Civil Rights Movement was emerging, so many engaged in legal activism to promote equal rights and combat racial discrimination. While they made important contributions to the movement, a lack of visibility persisted. The work of Black men was more widely emphasized.

Constance Baker Motley was a prominent figure of this period. She began her career as a lawyer, handling many cases involving discrimination. She worked for the National Association for the Advancement of Colored People (NAACP) in the 1950s. In a society where Black women were considered intellectually inferior, Motley's competence was frequently questioned. Many male lawyers attempted to convince judges in the courtroom that she was unqualified to argue a case. Despite these incidents, Motley advanced in career, eventually becoming the first Black woman appointed to a federal court in 1966. Challenges to her competence continued in her time as a judge. Motley was asked to recuse herself from a gender-discrimination case against Sullivan & Cromwell in New York on the grounds that her identity as a Black woman gave her a conflict of interest. She argued against this idea, affirming that her identity did not affect her ability to be impartial.

Other influential Black women lawyers of this period made progress for racial justice. In 1955, Frankie Freeman (also a lawyer for the NAACP) won the case David v. St Louis Housing Authority, which ruled that the St. Louis Housing Authority could not engage in racially discriminatory practices when renting properties to clients. Ada Lois Sipuel Fisher was the plaintiff in the early landmark civil rights case, Sipuel v. Board of Regents of the University of Oklahoma. She was initially denied admission to the University of Oklahoma law school, so she sued the university on the grounds of segregation. The subsequent ruling lead to her eventual admission to the university. Sipuel was later appointed to the Board of Regents of the University of Oklahoma in 1992.

=== Late 1960s–1970s ===
Black women lawyers in the late 1960s and into the 1970s began to draw attention to the simultaneous discrimination against Black women in law. While these women were still involved with legal activism in the realm of racial justice, they began to incorporate gender issues into their legal work and scholarship. Conversations about the challenges faced by Black women for their dual identities were met with resistance from both Black men and white women in social justice organizations. Pauli Marray outlined connections between race and gender with her "race-gender analogy argument" that was intended to draw comparisons between discrimination against Black people and discrimination against women. Her goal was to emphasize the lack of inclusion for women in racial justice reform movements. Although her argument treated race and gender as mutually exclusive entities, Marray's work set the stage for the concept of intersectionality.

=== 1980s–present ===
Increased inclusion of Black women in legal scholarship in the 1980s contributed to the rise of research on the intersection of the two identities. Rather than simply comparing race and gender, Black women lawyers began to focus on the specific struggles faced by Black women. The intersectionality approach was created by Kimberlé Crenshaw in the 1980s. She claimed that society could not consider just blackness or just womanhood when confronting the unique discrimination faced by Black women. The intersection of the two identities of Black and female created different axes of oppression that could not be fully explained by traditional interpretations of racial injustice or injustice against women. The story of Anita Hill, another Black female lawyer, highlights aspects of the intersectionality approach. Criticisms directed at her were those that were historically targeted towards women and Black people separately. She experienced both simultaneously.

Black women of this period continued to break barriers. Historian Annette Gordon-Reed became the first Black woman editor of the Harvard Law Review in 1982. In 2021, there were 28 Black women law school deans in the United States, an all-time high. In 2018, 19 Black women were elected to the Harris County courts in Houston. In 2022, Ketanji Brown Jackson became the first Black woman to serve as an associate justice of the Supreme Court of the United States.

In recent years, Black women lawyers have begun breaking new ground in emerging areas of law, taking on leadership roles and carving out spaces in industries that were once hard to enter. Attorneys such as Tanisha Pinkins have built careers at the intersection of sports, entertainment, and intellectual property, helping to negotiate Name, Image, and Likeness (NIL) deals for student-athletes and ensuring fair representation for young talent. Similarly, lawyers like Traci V. Bransford have become trusted voices in collegiate sports law, guiding universities and athletes through the evolving NIL policy and compliance.

== Scholarship ==
Academics and lawyers have written about the intersection of Black women and the legal profession on numerous occasions. In 2000, J. Clay Smith Jr., Dean of the Howard University School of Law, published Rebels in Law: Voices in History of Black Women Lawyers with the University of Michigan Press. In 2019, Tsedale M. Melaku's book, You Don't Look Like a Lawyer: Black Women and Systemic Gendered Racism was published by Rowman & Littlefield.

Many of these academic works center the concept of intersectionality. Scholars argue that while the number of Black women in law is increasing, their opportunities for advancement remain limited. They are still considered less capable and less qualified than their white or male counterparts. They are assigned lower-profile cases and passed over for promotions. Tsedale M. Melaku argues in her book that Black women face obstacles when trying to network and form social relationships, and this affects their career advancement. Those holding the seat of power within law firms are typically white men. She claims white men can relate to white women because their presence evokes a sort of sympathy associated with white women's similarities to their mothers and wives. White men can relate to Black men on the common ground of manhood. Black women are left with no relation and are thus overlooked by the white men in power. Melaku describes another challenge for Black women in legal professions called "the inclusion tax concept." Black women must use more time, money, and energy to conform to the workplace standards set by white men. This involves discussions of which appearances are deemed professional, specifically about Black women's hair. She argues that this further contributes to the lack of career advancement for Black women in law firms.

Taneisha N. Means examines discrimination against Black women judges in her article "Her Honor: Black Women Judges' Experiences with Disrespect and Recusal Requests in the American Judiciary" in Journal of Women, Politics & Policy. Despite higher law school attendance rates for Black women than Black men, Black women remain less represented in the courts. Means argues that when evaluating candidates for judicial appointments, the American Bar Association (ABA) is far more likely to give white people and men higher ratings, indicating that they are more qualified (even if that it is not actually true). This affects Black women's ability to be appointed as judges. Even when they make it to the bench, they face discrimination in the form of “having their legitimacy, authority, and competence questioned.” In line with the story of Constance Baker Motley, many Black women are asked to recuse themselves from cases under claims that their identity as Black women will reduce their ability to be impartial.

Scholars claim that despite major advancements, Black women remain heavily sidelined in legal professions. In a journal article about the concept of intersectionality, Anna Carastathis claims that even the concept of intersectionality itself has been incorporated under the umbrella of women's studies, and attention to its origins in Black feminist thought are often overlooked.

== Racialized Gender Stereotypes ==
The racialized gender stereotypes have proven to be an additional barrier for African American women who are pursuing careers in law. As these stereotypes are usually imposed on them without consent, they affect how others perceive the behaviors, competence, and authority of Black women lawyers. Scholarly research has demonstrated that the stereotypes attributed to Black women can result in closer examination of the work performance and communication style and create preconceived notions regarding their role in an organization.

The intersectionality of gender and race can also determine what is considered "proper" in terms of demeanor and leadership. Studies have shown that compared to their white male or white female counterparts, there are fewer options available to Black women regarding appropriate professional behavior. .

== See also ==
- Women in law
- List of first women lawyers and judges in the United States
