= Georgiana Simpson =

African-American philologist

Dr. Georgiana Rose Simpson
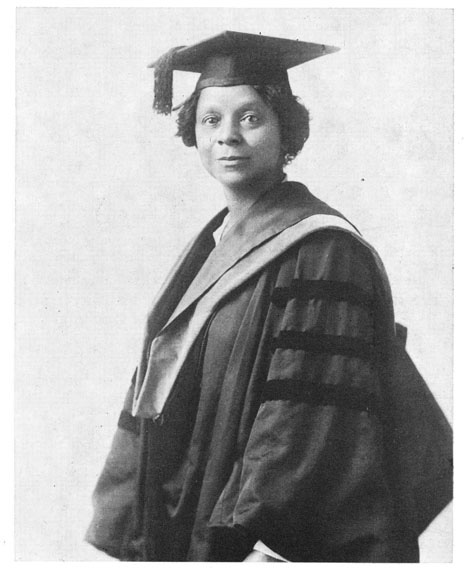
- Simpson in 1921, wearing academic dress for her graduation from the University of Chicago
- Born: March 31, 1865
- Died: January 27, 1944 (aged 78)
- Occupation: Professor
- Years active: 1915–1944

Academic background
- Education: University of Chicago
- Thesis: 'Herder's Conception of "Das Volk"' (1921)

Academic work
- Discipline: Philologist
- Sub-discipline: German language
- Institutions: Howard University

Georgiana Rose Simpson (March 31, 1865 – January 27, 1944) was a philologist and the first African-American woman to receive a PhD in the United States. Simpson received her doctoral degree in German from the University of Chicago in 1921.

== Early life and education ==
Simpson was born in Washington, D.C., on 31 March 1865, eldest daughter of David and Catherine Simpson, where she attended public school. She later received training to teach in city elementary schools at Miner Normal School in Washington, D.C., and started teaching in 1885. During this time, she taught within German immigrant communities. She was encouraged to continue learning and to formally study German in college by one of her former teachers, Dr. Lucy E. Moten.

Simpson enrolled at the University of Chicago in 1907, and received a Bachelor of Arts degree in German in 1911. To avoid the pervasive racism on campus, she finished her studies mainly through summer and correspondence courses. She completed her master's degree with her thesis, The Phonology of Merigarto which examined an early Middle High German poem. Simpson was also teaching at Dunbar High School (Washington, D.C.) during her post-graduate years. At age 55, she completed her dissertation, Herder's Conception of "Das Volk", and received her doctorate in German studies on 14 June 1921, making her (by one day, followed by Sadie T.M. Alexander and later that month by Eva Beatrice Dykes) the first African-American woman to receive a PhD. Simpson was a member of Alpha Kappa Alpha sorority.

== Experience and contributions during segregation ==
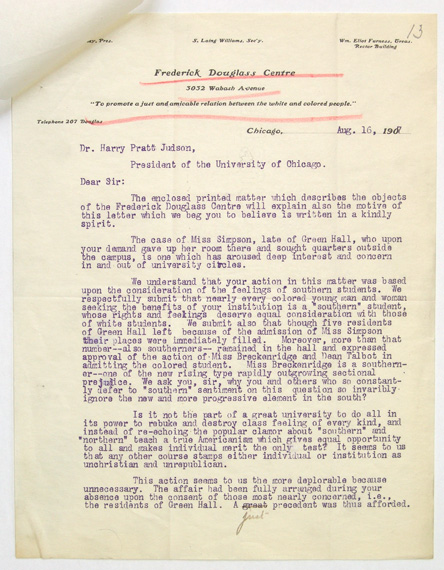
A letter condemning the removal of Simpson from Univ. of Chicago campus housing

Simpson and her achievements have been discussed in the context of the civil rights movement during segregation. She experienced racial prejudice very early on in her enrollment at the University of Chicago, particularly in housing; that she was invited to reside in the women's dormitory was met with protest from white students. She was initially asked to leave the women's dormitory by Sophonisba Breckinridge, who headed the residence hall, but Simpson refused. Breckinridge reversed her decision so that Simpson could remain, but she was overruled by university president Harry Pratt Judson, who asked Simpson to leave, to which she complied. Consequently, Simpson took her courses during the summer to avoid further racially motivated conflicts with the predominantly white, southern student body. Furthermore, a letter from the Frederick Douglass Centre was sent to President Judson condemning their action to remove Simpson:

The case of Miss Simpson ... who upon your demand gave up her room there and sought quarters outside the campus, is one which has aroused deep interest and concern in and out of university circles.

— Cecelia Woolley, in a letter to University of Chicago president, Harry Pratt Judson (1907).

Simpson was the first black woman to be awarded a doctoral degree in the United States. Simpson returned to Dunbar High School in Washington, D.C., to teach as most universities did not hire black women outside of home economics courses at this time. Simpson also wrote a letter to W. E. B. Du Bois in 1936 inquiring about an encyclopedic project and how she may contribute an article on the "Negro dialect" or on the "philosophy of Negro folk literature." Her final major publication was a translation of a French work, detailing the biography of Toussaint L'Ouverture, the leader of the Haitian Revolution.

After leaving Dunbar High School, Simpson was a professor at Howard University, retiring in 1939. She died January 27, 1944.

In 2017, the Monumental Women Project, co-founded by Asya Akca and Shae Omonijo, honored Simpson by commissioning a bust of her in the Reynolds Club at the University of Chicago, which was placed directly across from a relief that honors President Judson. Miss Simpson was a member of Alpha Kappa Alpha Sorority Incorporated. Miss Simpson marched in the 1913 Woman Suffrage Procession.

== See also ==
- List of African-American pioneers in desegregation of higher education
- Edward A. Bouchet
- Sadie T. M. Alexander
- Eva B. Dykes
