= Jehu Jones =

American Lutheran minister

Jehu Jones Jr. (1786–1852) was a Lutheran minister who founded one of the first African-American Lutheran congregations in the United States, as well as actively involved in improving the social welfare of African-Americans.

== Early and family life ==
Jones was born enslaved in Charleston, South Carolina, and named after his father, Jehu Jones Sr., a tailor who bought his freedom (along with that of his wife, Jehu's mother, Abigail) in 1798, and eventually became a successful real estate investor and innkeeper in Charleston. Because of his mixed race ancestry, Jehu Jones was able to join Charleston's relatively privileged mulatto elite; his father bought his first slave in 1807. Jones took over his father's tailoring business circa 1816, as his father concentrated his own energies on a hotel which he opened to cater to white travellers.

Although originally connected with the Episcopal Church, Jones Jr. joined the Lutheran Church and became of member of Charleston's St. John's Lutheran congregation in 1820. However, after the Denmark Vesey conspiracy of 1822, South Carolina increasingly restricted the civil rights even of free blacks.

His brother Edward Jones, became the second black college graduate, eventually immigrating to Freetown, Sierra Leone to become the first principal of Fourah Bay College.

== Ministry ==
In 1832, with the encouragement of his pastor, Rev. John Bachman, Jones traveled to New York for ordination as a missionary by the New York Synod, having accepted a job as a missionary to Liberia. There, he was to work with freed slaves sent by the American Colonization Society who emigrated to that new nation.

However, Jones did not reach Liberia, for upon his return to Charleston after ordination, he was briefly jailed for violating South Carolina's new law (passed after Nat Turner's Rebellion) which increased the prohibition on free blacks from returning to the state (which his mother Abigail had encountered after a trip to New York some time before 1827).

Upon his father's death (and his own release from jail) in 1833, Jones received his inheritance and moved to Philadelphia. In June, the Lutheran Church there appointed Jones as a missionary to the city's black population, already served by St. Thomas' Episcopal Church. Shortly thereafter, his St. Paul's Lutheran congregation decided to build a church, and with the assistance of nearby Lutheran congregations, bought two lots on Quince Street. After raising about 40% of the funds needed, in 1836, Rev. Jones and fellow Lutheran pastors Philip Mayer and Benjamin Keller dedicated the new building. However, three years later, approximately $1300 was still owed on the mortgage, which was foreclosed and sold at auction. The building now is The Mask and Wig Club.

Jones remained active in the Philadelphia African American congregation, as well as Pennsylvania politics and the national Colored Conventions Movement through at least 1851, the year before his death. In 1845, he helped organize a convention to unite freed blacks to petition for civil rights. He and the St. Paul's congregation were also active in the Moral Reform and Improvement Society, a group of African-American churches whose goal was to improve the social conditions for blacks in Philadelphia. Jones also founded Lutheran Churches (with congregations of all races) in Gettysburg and Chambersburg.

== Death and legacy ==
The Lutheran Church remembers Jones (and his priestly service) annually in the Calendar of Saints on November 24, with Justus Falckner and William Passavant. The year following his death, the Methodist Church ordained fellow Charleston native turned Pennsylvania Daniel Payne (who had studied at the Lutheran seminary in Gettysburg circa 1835 and was ordained by Rev. John D. Lawyer of the Franckean Synod in 1837 at Fordsbush, Montgomery County, NY. He first served the Liberty Street or African Presbyterian Church in Troy, NY. He was followed in that Church by Henry Highland Garnet. He had a scholarship with the Lutheran Seminary and evidently had a commitment to the Lutheran Church because of the Scholarship and the Franckeans continued to keep him on their rolls even after he joined the African Methodist Episcopal Church (AME) in 1842) and became an African-American bishop and first Black College President (the Lutheran Calendar remembers Payne, who helped found Wilberforce University in Ohio in 1856, on November 2). Although the St. Paul's congregation dissolved a few years after Jones's death, its former building remains standing in Philadelphia.
