= Charlotte B. Ray =

American social activist (c. 1813 – 1891)

- Born: Charlotte Augusta Burroughs c. 1813; Chatham County, Georgia, U.S.
- Died: 25 October 1891; New York City, U.S.
- Other names: Charlotte Augusta Burroughs Ray, Charlotte Augusta Burroughs, Charlotte Augusta Burrows, Charlotte Burroughs Ray, Charlotte Burrows Ray
- Occupations: Suffragist; abolitionist
- Spouse: Charles Bennett Ray (m. 1840; died 1886)
- Children: 7, including Charlotte and Cordelia

Charlotte B. Ray (née Charlotte Augusta Burroughs; c. 1813 – 25 October 1891) was an American prominent pastor, suffragist, and abolitionist. Charlotte was the second wife of Charles Bennett Ray a revered African-American journalist. They were an active part of the Underground Railroad in Manhattan.

== Biography ==
Charlotte Augusta Burroughs was born around 1813, in Chatham County, Georgia, to African American parents Augustus Burroughs and Pacella. Many details of Charlotte's childhood are unknown.

Charlotte was a pastor for the New York's Bethesda Congregational Church. Her Christian faith fueled her activism to legalize women's right to vote, and protect African-American women who were predisposed to illness and disabilities resulting from slavery. Charlotte was also an active member in the American Equal Rights Association (AERA) and the American Anti-Slavery Society.

Ray died on October 25, 1891.

== Marriage and children ==
Charlotte relocated to New York City, where in 1840 she married Charles Bennett Ray. Together they had seven children. Four survived to adulthood:

- Clarence F. Ray (1848–?).
- Florence Theresa Ray (February 6, 1847 – June 15, 1920); no issue.
- Charlotte E. Ray (January 13, 1850 – January 4, 1911); no issue.
- Henrietta Cordelia Ray (August 30, 1852 – January 5, 1916); no issue.

All four of her children received a college education. Her daughter Charlotte F. was the first African-American woman to receive a law degree. Her eldest daughter Florence also became an attorney. Her youngest child Henrietta Cordelia became a famous poet.

== See also ==
- List of African-American abolitionists
