= Henrietta Ray =

African-American activist (c.1808–1836)

Henrietta Green Regulus Ray (c. 1808–1836) was an African-American female activist living in New York City who advocated for women's education and independence. She helped found the African Dorcas Association, an organization that worked to provide clothing to students of the African Free School, and she became the organization's secretary in 1828. In 1834, she married Rev. Charles B. Ray, an African-American abolitionist and owner and editor of the Colored American, a weekly newspaper. Around the same time as her marriage, she also was elected as the first president of the New York Female Literary Society, which was "formed for the purpose of acquiring literary and scientific knowledge." She died in 1836 of tuberculosis.

The poet Henrietta Cordelia Ray was named in her honor.
