= Sadie T. M. Alexander =

American lawyer, civil rights activist, and economist (1898–1989)

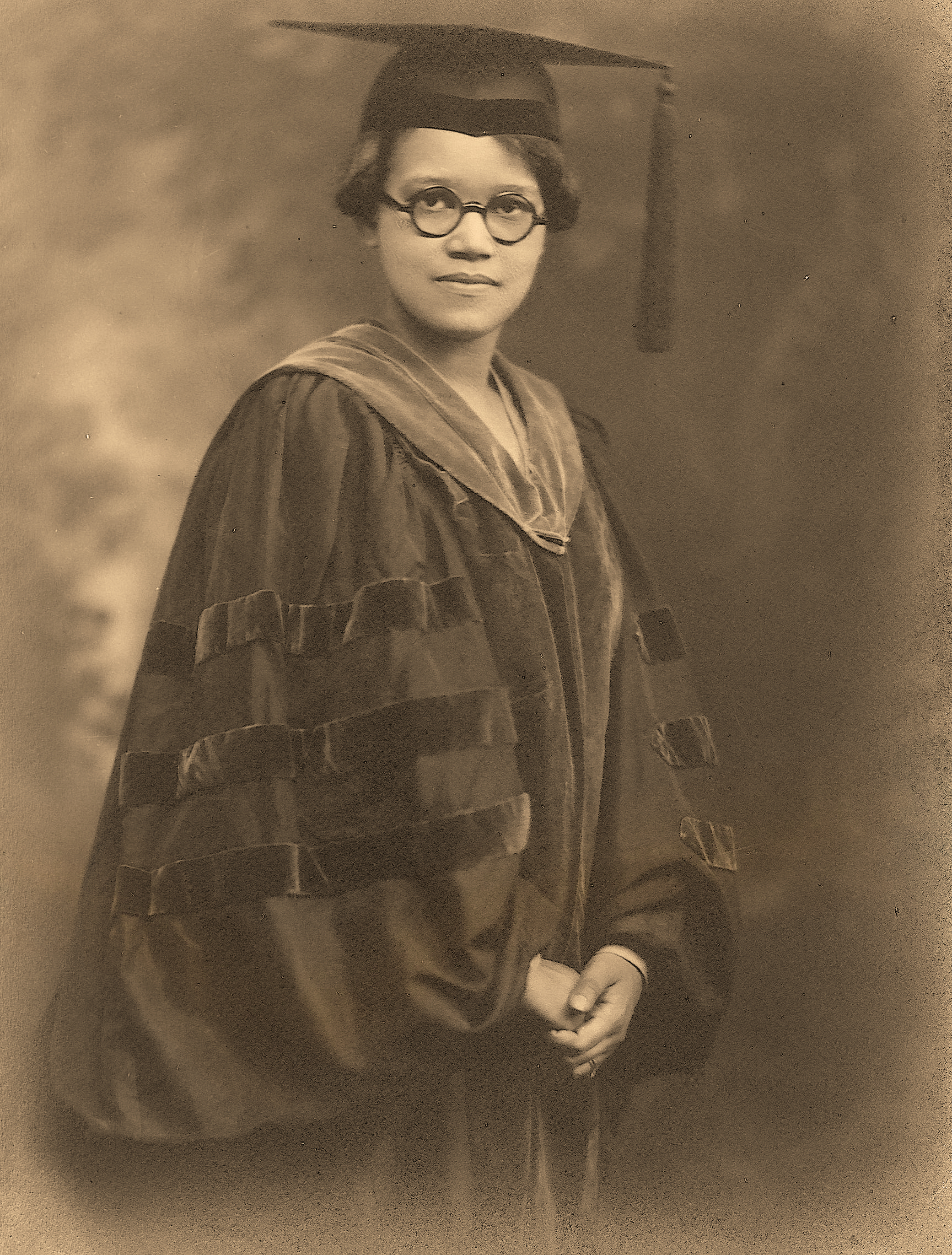
- Alexander upon receiving her PhD
- Born: Sadie Tanner Mossell; January 2, 1898; Philadelphia, Pennsylvania, U.S.
- Died: November 1, 1989 (aged 91); Philadelphia, Pennsylvania, U.S.
- Education: University of Pennsylvania (AB, AM, PhD, LLB)
- Spouse: Raymond Pace Alexander (m. 1923)
- Children: 2
- Parent: Aaron Albert Mossell II (father)

Sadie Tanner Mossell Alexander (January 2, 1898 – November 1, 1989) was a pioneering Black professional and civil rights activist of the early-to-mid-20th century. In 1921, Mossell Alexander was the first African-American woman to receive a Ph.D. in economics. In 1927, she was the first Black woman to receive a law degree from the University of Pennsylvania Law School and became the first Black woman to practice law in the state. She was also the first national president of Delta Sigma Theta sorority, serving from 1919 to 1923.

Mossell Alexander and her husband were active in civil rights, both in Philadelphia and nationally. In 1946 she was appointed to the President's Committee on Civil Rights established by Harry Truman. In 1952 she was appointed to the city's Commission on Human Relations, serving through 1968. She was a founding member of the national Lawyers' Committee for Civil Rights Under Law (1963). She served on the board of the National Urban League for 25 years. U.S. President Jimmy Carter named her in 1979 to chair the decennial White House Conference on Aging, an appointment later withdrawn by Richard Schweiker, President Ronald Reagan's Secretary of Health and Human Services.

== Biography ==
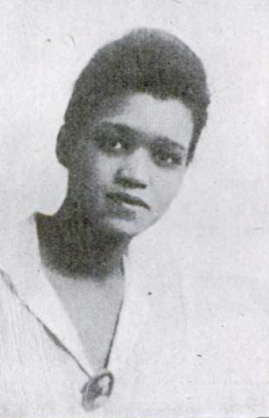
Mossell in 1918

Sadie Tanner Mossell was born on January 2, 1898, in Philadelphia to Aaron Albert Mossell II and Mary Louisa Tanner (born 1867). Mossell attended high school in Washington, D.C. at the M Street School, now known as Dunbar High School, graduating in 1915. She was able to do so because she stayed with her uncle Dr. Lewis Baxter Moore and step aunt at their home on the campus of Howard University.

Mossell returned to Philadelphia to study at the School of Education at the University of Pennsylvania, graduating in 1918. There, she faced numerous hardships, due to her race and gender, such as poor advising, false accusations of plagiarism, and other students stealing her intellectual property. She pursued graduate work in economics, also at Penn, earning her master's in 1919. Awarded the Francis Sergeant Pepper fellowship, she was able to continue her studies and in 1921 became one of the first three African-American women to earn a PhD from an American university (along with Georgiana Simpson and Eva Beatrice Dykes, all within days of one another).

Finding it difficult to get professorship work in Philadelphia as an African-American even with her doctorate, Mossell decided to take an actuarial job with the black-owned North Carolina Mutual Life Insurance Company in Durham, North Carolina, and worked there for two years.

In 1919, she was elected the first national President of Delta Sigma Theta. Mossell Alexander also served as the legal advisor to Delta Sigma Theta sorority for 35 years. She was in contact with the Alpha chapter of Delta Sigma Theta since 1915 when she arrived at the University of Pennsylvania. However, she needed five students to charter a chapter of the sorority, which was not possible until 1918. In March 1918, the Gamma chapter of Delta Sigma Theta was established with Mossell as its first President. At the request of the Alpha chapter, the four existing chapters of Delta Sigma Theta were called to convene at Howard University in December 1919. The sorority planned to host their meetings in the women's dormitory on campus until Mossell's uncle Lewis Baxter Moore offered his office as a meeting place. At this convention, the Grand Chapter of the sorority was established, taking the sorority from a loose federation of chapters to a national body. Under Mossell's leadership the Sorority expanded to new locales in the West, the South, and further into the Midwest and Northeast. She also initiated Delta's first national program, May Week.

In 1923, Mossell married Raymond Pace Alexander shortly after he was admitted to the bar, then returned with him to Philadelphia. Mossell received job offers from several Black colleges and universities, but none of them was located in Philadelphia, and she had no desire to leave her new family. So she stayed home for a year, did volunteer work, and eventually entered law school.

She was the first African-American woman admitted to the University of Pennsylvania Law School. While a law student, the dean attempted to deny her participation on the law review, but her fellow students – including Philip Werner Amram, who was then editor-in-chief of the University of Pennsylvania Law Review – insisted that she be allowed this honor, which she had earned. In 1927, she was Penn's first African-American woman graduate, and the first to be admitted to the Pennsylvania Bar.

Mossell Alexander practiced law from 1927 until her retirement in 1982. Upon admission to the Bar, she joined her husband's law practice as partner, specializing in estate and family law. They both were active in civil rights law as well. In 1928 she was the first African-American woman appointed as Assistant City Solicitor for the City of Philadelphia, serving to 1930. She was reappointed from 1934 to 1938. From 1943 to 1947, she was the first woman to serve as secretary of the National Bar Association. She was appointed to the Commission on Human Relations of the City of Philadelphia, serving from 1952 to 1968. In 1959, when her husband was appointed to the Court of Common Pleas in Philadelphia, she opened her own law office. She continued to practice law independently until her husband's death in 1974. In 1976, she joined the firm of Atkinson, Myers, and Archie as a general counsel, where she remained until her retirement.

Mossell Alexander died on November 1, 1989, at Cathedral Village in Andorra, Philadelphia, from pneumonia as a complication from Alzheimer's disease. She was buried in West Laurel Hill Cemetery.

== Family ==
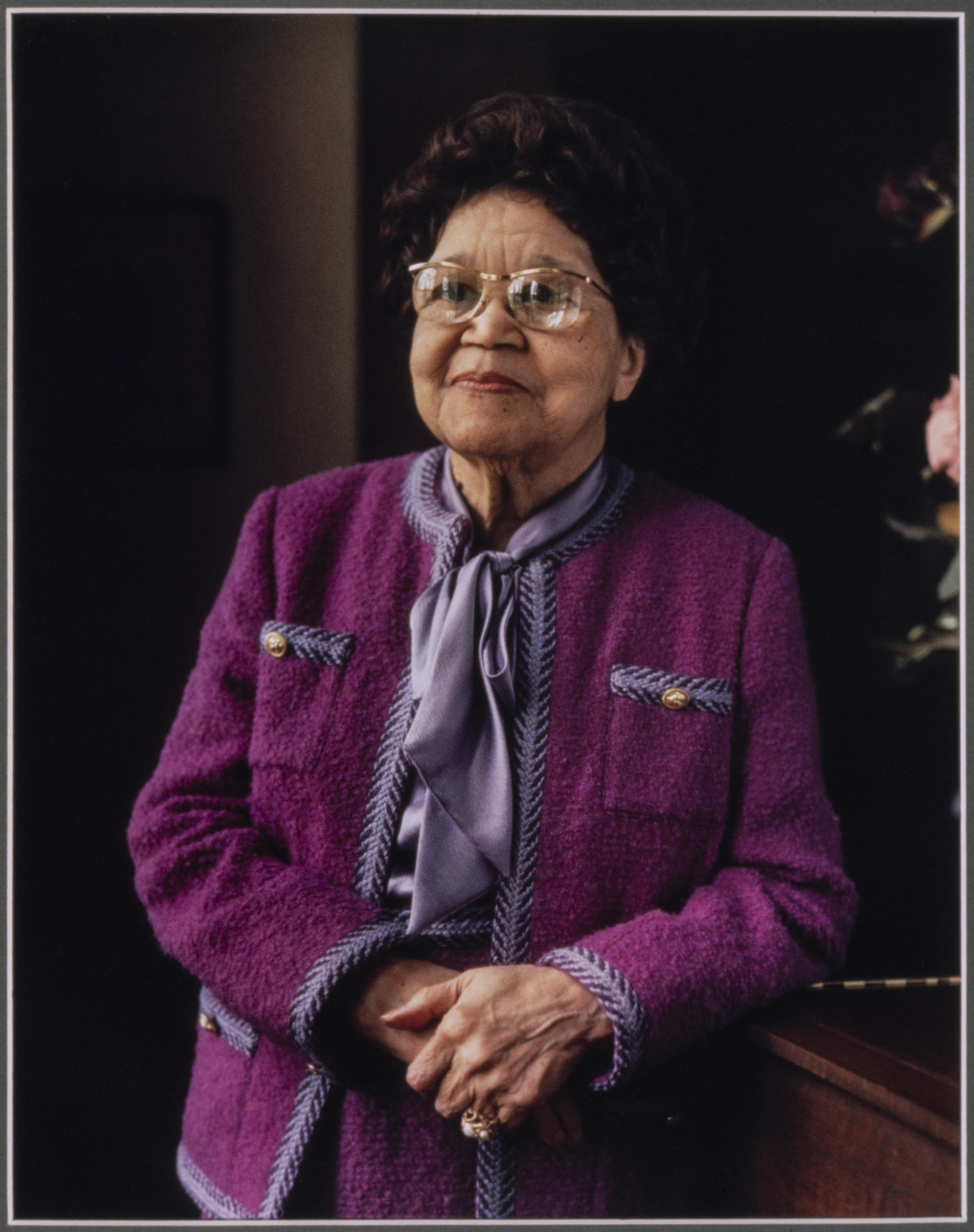
Sadie Alexander in 1982

Her maternal grandfather was Benjamin Tucker Tanner (1835–1923), a bishop in the African Methodist Episcopal Church (AME) and editor of the Christian Recorder. Bishop Tanner and his wife Sarah Elizabeth Tanner had seven children, including Henry Ossawa Tanner (1859–1937), who became a noted painter, and Hallie Tanner Johnson, the first female physician to practice medicine in Alabama and who established the Nurses' School and Hospital at the Tuskegee Institute in Alabama.

Her father, Aaron Albert Mossell II (1863–1951), was the first African-American graduate of the University of Pennsylvania School of Law and practiced as a lawyer in Philadelphia. In 1899, when his daughter Sadie was a one year old, he abandoned his family and moved to Wales. Her uncle, Nathan Francis Mossell (1856–1946) was the first African-American graduate of the University of Pennsylvania School of Medicine.

Mossell Alexander's siblings include Aaron Albert Mossell III (1893–1975), who became a pharmacist; and Elizabeth Mossell (1894–1975), who became a Dean of Women at Virginia State College, a historically black college.

During her high school years, Mossell lived in Washington, DC, with her uncle, Lewis Baxter Moore, who was dean at Howard University and her step aunt Lavinia W. Moore.

On November 29, 1923, Sadie Tanner Mossell married Raymond Pace Alexander (1897–1974) in her parents' home on Diamond Street in North Philadelphia, with the ceremony performed by her father. Alexander, whose parents were formerly enslaved, grew up in Philadelphia. He attended and graduated from Central High School (1917, valedictorian), Wharton School of the University of Pennsylvania (1920), and Harvard Law School (1923). At the time of their marriage, he had established a law practice in Philadelphia.

Sadie and Raymond had four premature children, with only the last two surviving. They were able to raise two daughters: Mary Elizabeth Alexander (born 1934), who married Melvin Brown; and Rae Pace Alexander (born 1937), who earned a Ph.D. and married Archie C. Epps III. After her divorce with Epps, in 1971 Rae Pace Alexander married Thomas Minter, and they had two sons together.

== Views and activities ==
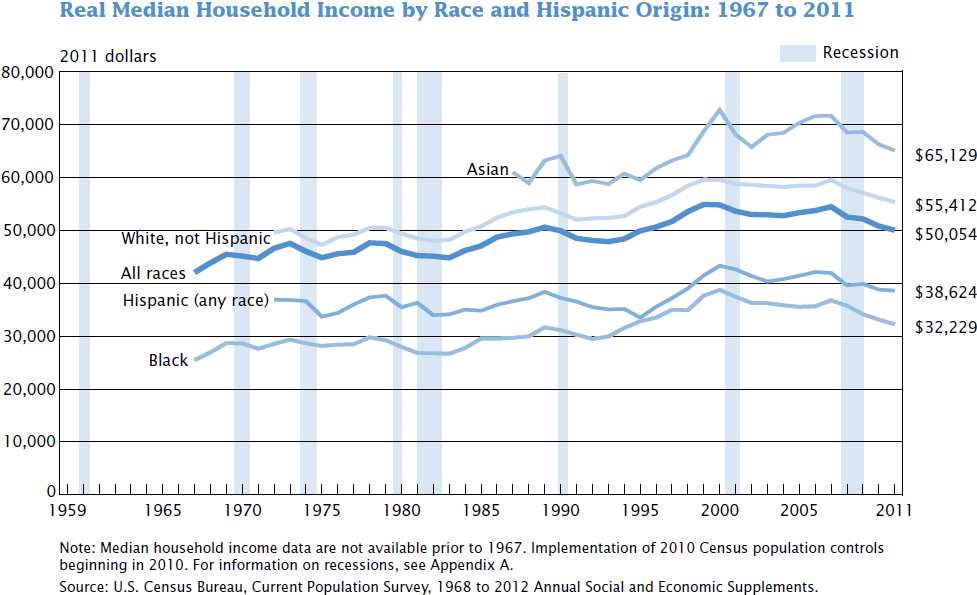
This graph shows the inequality of real median US household income by race: 1967 to 2011, in 2011 dollars.

According to Nina Banks, Alexander's opposition to racial oppression was within a tradition of 19th century scholars Frederick Douglass and T. Thomas Fortune, and with later scholars W.E.B. DuBois and A. Philip Randolph. Alexander's focus was frequently on racial and economic justice for the working class, especially for working men and women. However, unlike Dubois or Randolph, Alexander never embraced socialism. Alexander also can be contrasted with Howard University radicals Ralph Bunche, E. Franklin Frazier, and fellow black economist Abram Harris. For example, Harris wrote that the fundamental problems facing blacks could be overcome through multi-racial labor organizing and did not support direct action for civil rights until blacks had achieved economic power. Alexander, on the other hand, was outspoken against white dominance in political, social, and economic spheres.

Alexander's work and views are recorded in speeches kept in the University of Pennsylvania archives. Among her earliest works are from the 1920s and discuss black workers in the US economy. In 1921, Alexander wrote for her doctoral dissertation, "The Standard of Living Among One Hundred Negro Migrant Families in Philadelphia". At a time when few economists focused on Black life in America, Alexander’s work provided insight into the economic conditions faced by African American families who had moved north during the Great Migration. By surveying 100 African American families in Philadelphia, she explored how low wages, high rents, and discrimination prevented them from moving up in the social class. Her findings challenged the narrative that Black poverty was due to personal failings, instead attributing it to economic barriers like unequal pay and restricted access to jobs and housing. In 1930, Alexander published an article, "Negro Women in Our Economic Life", which was published in Urban League's Opportunity magazine advocating black women's employment, particularly in industrial jobs. Alexander generally supported the Republican Party, suspicious of the control of conservative southern whites over the Democratic Party, although she also criticized Republican political appointments, as well as what she saw as uneven benefits of the New Deal which did not do enough to help blacks who were most hurt by the great depression. Her perspective on the New Deal is focused on advocating for reforms that ensure African American workers receive equitable benefits from government legislation. She highlights the necessity for fair administration of all forms of federal aid, including farm relief, public works programs, and subsidized relief, specifically to guarantee that African American laborers receive their rightful share. This view criticizes the limitations of the New Deal in adequately supporting Black workers and calls for legislative changes to protect them against racially motivated dismissals, especially significant in a time characterized by progressive labor protections. She emphasized an urgent need for the government to enforce policies that ensure racial equity in the distribution of economic benefits and protections provided by the New Deal. Alexander’s 1935 speech "The Emancipated Woman: Past, Present, and Future", tackled the evolving role of women in American society, with an emphasis on the double burden carried by Black women. Alexander argued that while all women faced social and economic restrictions, Black women were especially disadvantaged by both racism and sexism. She criticized the “ideal” lifestyle of womanhood that was reserved for white middle-class women, pointing out that Black women had always worked—often in domestic labor or low-wage jobs—not out of choice, but necessity. During World War II, Alexander saw similarities in a rise in racial violence and discrimination in the US as paralleling the treatment of Jews in Germany. Near the end of the war, she supported integrating labor unions to increase their bargaining power once the war economy slowed and industrial employment moved toward pre-war levels. Her interest in labor economic issues extended to advocating for government regulation to smooth fluctuations in the business cycle, modification of tariffs, regulation of public utilities, and regulation of securities and securities markets.

After the war she was appointed to Truman's Presidential Committee on Human Rights and shifted her focus to civil and human rights. Evidence in the archives suggests that her focus was in this direction for over a decade. Before being on the President's Committee on Civil Rights in 1947, Alexander held elected positions in national organizations such as the National Urban League, National Association for the Advancement of Colored People, Delta Sigma Theta sorority, National Bar Association, and the American Civil Liberties Union. Her advocacy primarily focused on economic issues affecting Black workers and challenging structural impediments to African American rights. In 1949, Alexander and six other Philadelphians formed the Citizens' Council on Democratic Rights to "protect and extend the enjoyment of human rights." In 1951, joined by Henry W. Sawyer, the Council became the Greater Philadelphia Branch of the American Civil Liberties Union; Alexander continued to serve on that organization's board of directors for many years. In 1963 she gave a speech to the Annual Conference of Commission on Human Rights and she returned to the topic of economic justice, advocating for universal employment.

In a 1981 interview she did with the Geriatric Nursing journal about her position as chair of the WHCoA, Alexander expressed her disapproval of anti-abortion legislation. She advocated for better benefits for nurses and stressed their vitality to the healthcare system. She also expressed that everyone, no matter their age or educational level, can add value to the economy with the proper support. Alexander’s economic thought centered on the relationship between racial inequality and labor market outcomes in the United States. Drawing on her research and public speeches, she argued that disparities in wages, employment opportunities, and working conditions were shaped by systemic discrimination instead of individual failure. Her 1921 dissertation on Black migrant families in Philadelphia documented how low wages, high housing costs, and restricted job access limited economic mobility. In later writings, including “Negro Women in Our Economic Life,” she emphasized the concentration of Black women in low-wage domestic and service work and linked this to broader patterns of occupational segregation. Alexander also advocated for policy interventions such as fair employment practices, equitable distribution of public resources, and government responsibility in ensuring economic security. Her work contributed to early analyses of the intersection of race, gender, and economic inequality in the United States.

== Legacy and honors ==
Alexander wrote extensively on economic justice, often combining analyses of race and gender to examine how women of color experience inequality. In her 1930 article Negro Women in Our Economic Life, she analyzed the labor force participation of Black women, arguing that it was driven by economic necessity rather than social progress. She emphasized structural inequalities, including limited access to wealth, education, and stable employment opportunities. Alexander connected these conditions to broader questions of citizenship, arguing that political rights were incomplete without economic security. She supported policies such as minimum wage laws, full employment, and more equal income distribution, and asserted that the government had responsibility for ensuring basic economic conditions. She advocated for a federal job guarantee, treating employment as a fundamental right, a position later echoed in modern economic policy debates.

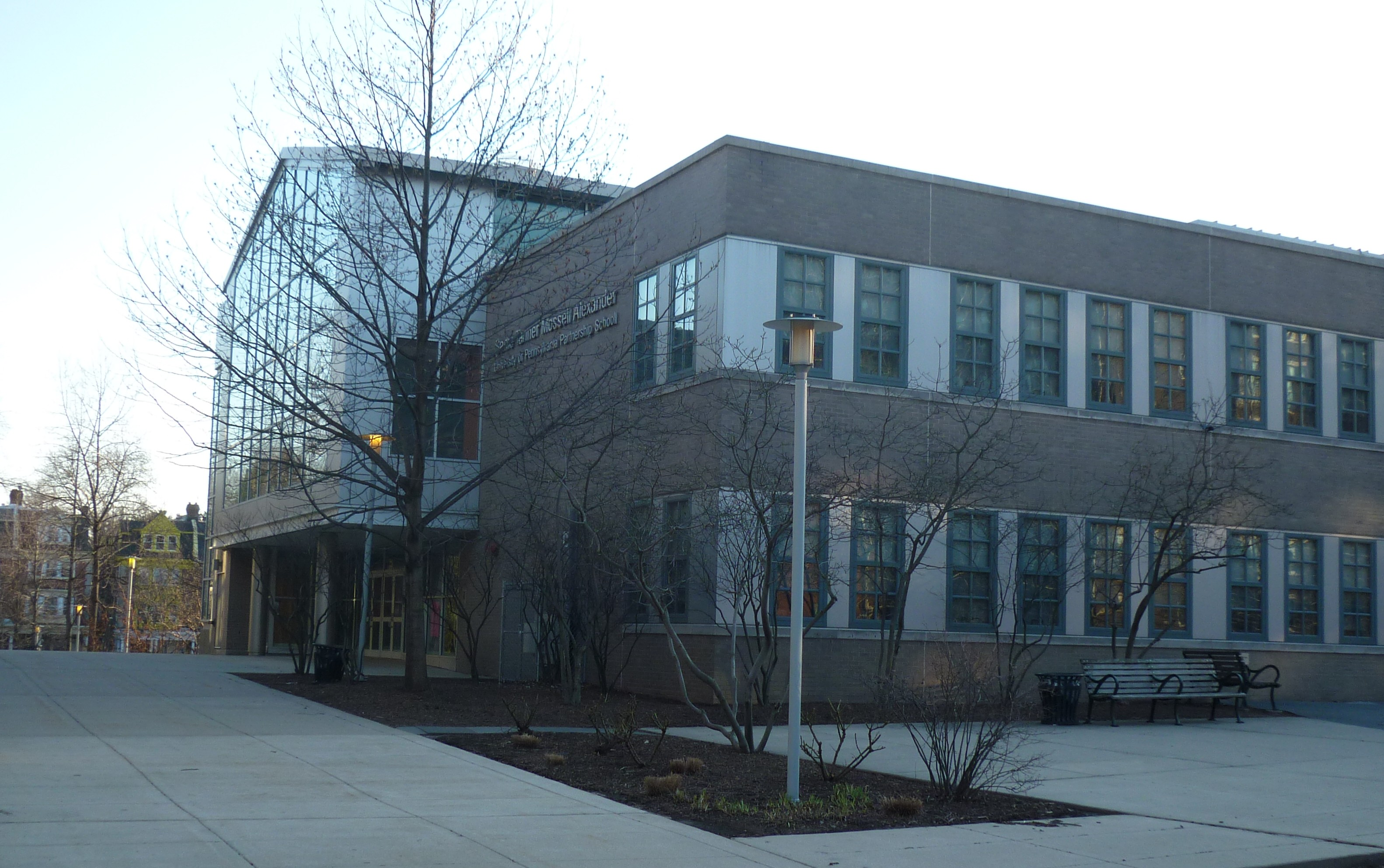
Penn Alexander School, 2016

- In 1948, the National Urban League featured Alexander as "Woman of the Year" in its comic book of Negro Heroes.
- In 1970, Alexander was belatedly granted membership into Phi Beta Kappa, an honor she had been denied as an undergraduate at University of Pennsylvania.
- In 1974, Alexander was awarded an honorary doctorate by the University of Pennsylvania, her first of seven such honors. She received the degree at University of Pennsylvania Law School.
- In 1980, Alexander received the Distinguished Service Award from the University of Pennsylvania's Law School.
- An elementary-through-middle school (grades K–8) in West Philadelphia, the Sadie Tanner Mossell Alexander University of Pennsylvania Partnership School ("Penn Alexander"), is named after her. The public school was developed in partnership with the university, which supports the school financially and academically.
- The Raymond Pace and Sadie Tanner Mossell Alexander Professorship at the University of Pennsylvania is named in honor of Alexander and her husband.
- In 2018, The Sadie Collective, an organization for Black Women in quantitative fields, was created in her honor. It hosted the first U.S. conference for Black Women in Economics in 2019, drawing attention from press outlets such as NPR, Forbes, Bloomberg, and Quartz as well as notable economists like Janet Yellen, former Chair of the Federal Reserve System, and James Poterba, current president and CEO of the NBER. The conference was attended by her daughter, Dr. Rae Pace Alexander-Minter, and took place at Mathematica Policy Research's Washington, D.C., office.
- In 2018, Philadelphia City Councilwoman Cherelle Parker, who was later elected mayor, proposed a measure to erect a statue of Alexander. The final design was announced in July 2025, by sculptor Vinnie Bagwell, to be installed near Philadelphia's Municipal Services Building in 2026.
- The Dr. Sadie T.M. Alexander Scholarship was proposed by the Black Law Students Association at the University of Pennsylvania Carey Law School in 2020. The free-tuition program, offered to three students who intended to focus on racial justice in their studies and law practice, was established at the University of Pennsylvania in February 2021. As of August 16, 2025, in response to the diversity, equity, and inclusion policies of the second Trump administration, the law school announced that it was closing its equal opportunity office and would not accept applications for Sadie Alexander scholarships in the upcoming scholarship cycle. These choices have been strongly criticised by alumni and students.
- On February 24, 2021, Alexander's life and accomplishments were the subject of an episode of the podcast Broads You Should Know.
- On April 27, 2022, Alexander was named a distinguished fellow by the American Economic Association for her contributions to economic equality and civil rights. She is the first and only economist to posthumously receive the award.

== See also ==
- List of first women lawyers and judges in Pennsylvania
- List of African-American pioneers in desegregation of higher education
- Georgiana Simpson
- Eva Beatrice Dykes
