= Eva Beatrice Dykes =

American academic (1893–1986)

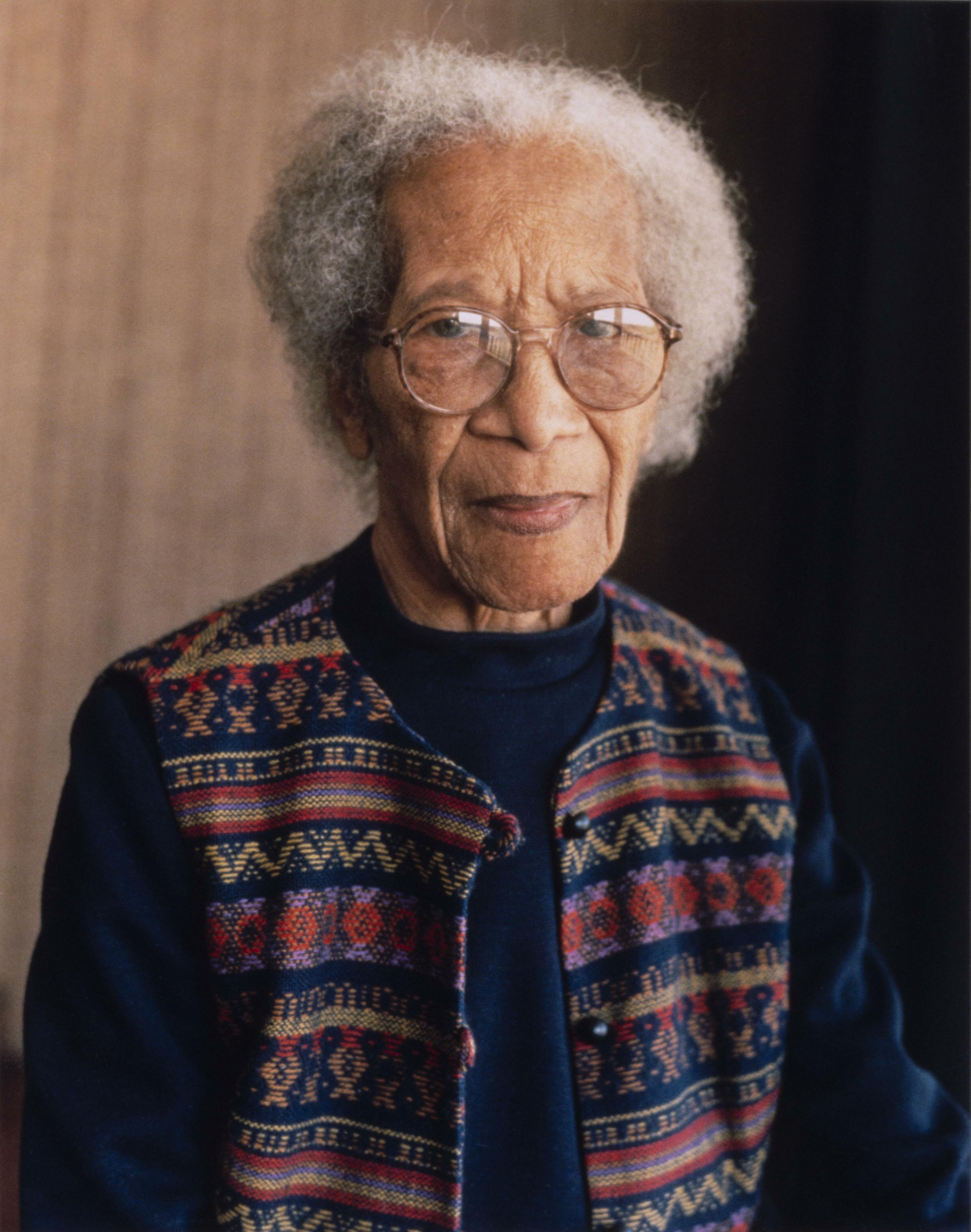
- Dykes c. 1976-81
- Born: August 13, 1893; Washington, DC, U.S.
- Died: October 29, 1986 (aged 93); Huntsville, Alabama, U.S.
- Education: Howard University; Radcliffe College
- Occupation: Educator

Eva Beatrice Dykes (August 13, 1893 – October 29, 1986) was a prominent educator and in 1921 one of the first three black American women to be awarded a PhD.

== Early life and education ==
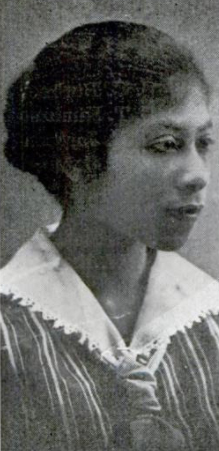
Dykes as a younger woman

Dykes was born in Washington, D.C., on August 13, 1893, the daughter of Martha Ann (née Howard) and James Stanley Dykes. She attended M Street High School (later renamed Dunbar High School). She graduated summa cum laude from Howard University with a B.A. in 1914. While attending Howard University, where several family members had studied, Eva was initiated into the Alpha chapter of Delta Sigma Theta. At the end of her last semester she was awarded Alpha Kappa Alpha sorority's first official scholarship. After a short stint of teaching at Walden University in Nashville, Tennessee, Dykes attended Radcliffe College graduating magna cum laude with a second B.A. in 1917 and a M.A in 1918. While at Radcliffe she was elected to Phi Beta Kappa. In 1920 Dykes began teaching at Dunbar High School, and in 1921 she received a PhD from Radcliffe (now a part of Harvard University). Her dissertation was titled “Pope and His influence in America from 1715 to 1815”, and explored the attitudes of Alexander Pope towards slavery and his influence on American writers. Dykes was the first black American woman to complete the requirements for a doctoral degree; however, because Radcliffe College held its graduation ceremonies later in the spring, she was the third to graduate, behind Sadie Tanner Mossell Alexander (1921, University of Pennsylvania) and Georgiana R. Simpson (1921, University of Chicago).

== Career ==
After her graduation from Radcliffe in 1921, Dykes continued to teach at Dunbar High School until 1929 when she returned to Howard University as a member of the English Faculty. An excellent teacher, Dykes won a number of teaching awards during her 15 years of service at Howard University. Her publications include Readings from Negro Authors for Schools and Colleges co-authored with Lorenzo Dow Turner and Otelia Cromwell (1931) and The Negro in English Romantic Thought: Or a Study in Sympathy for the Oppressed (1942). In 1934 Dykes began writing a column in the Seventh-day Adventist periodical Message Magazine, this continued until 1984.

In 1920 Dykes joined the Seventh-day Adventist Church, and in 1944 she joined the faculty of the then small and unaccredited Seventh-day Adventist Oakwood College in Huntsville, Alabama, as the Chair of the English Department. She was the first staff member at Oakwood to hold a doctoral qualification and was instrumental in assisting the college to gain accreditation. Dykes retired in 1968 but returned to Oakwood to teach in 1970 and continued until 1975. In 1973 the Oakwood College library was named in her honor and in 1980 she was made a Professor Emerita. In 1975 the General Conference of the Seventh-day Adventist Church presented Dykes with a Citation of Excellence honouring her for an outstanding contribution to Seventh-day Adventist education. Dykes died in Huntsville on October 29, 1986, at the age of 93.

== Publications ==
- Readings from Negro Authors for Schools and Colleges (1931). (Co-authored with Lorenzo Dow Turner and Otelia Cromwell.)
- The Negro in English Romantic Thought: Or a Study in Sympathy for the Oppressed (1942)

== See also ==
- Historically Black Colleges
- Female Education in the United States
- List of African-American pioneers in desegregation of higher education
