= List of African-American pioneers in desegregation of higher education =

This is a list of African-American pioneers in desegregation of higher education.

== 19th century ==
=== 1820s ===
==== 1823 ====
- First African-American to earn a bachelor's degree (Middlebury College): Alexander Twilight

==== 1826 ====
- First African-American graduate from Amherst College: Edward Jones
- First African-American graduate from Bowdoin College: John Brown Russwurm

=== 1830s ===
==== 1836 ====
- First African-American graduate from Case Western Reserve University: John Sykes Fayette

=== 1840s ===
==== 1847 ====
- First African-American to graduate from a U.S. medical school: Dr. David J. Peck (Rush Medical College)

==== 1849 ====
- First African-American college professor at a predominantly white institution: Charles L. Reason, New York Central College

=== 1860s ===
==== 1862 ====
- First African-American woman to earn a B.A.: Mary Jane Patterson, Oberlin College

==== 1864 ====
- First African-American woman in the United States to earn an M.D.: Rebecca Davis Lee Crumpler

=== 1870s ===
==== 1870 ====
- First African-American admitted to the U.S. Military Academy: James Webster Smith
- First Black graduate of Harvard College: Richard Greener

==== 1872 ====
- First African-American midshipman admitted to the United States Naval Academy: James H. Conyers (nominated by Robert B. Elliott of South Carolina)

==== 1873 ====
- First Black professor at the University of South Carolina, and the first Black professor at a predominantly White school in the South: Richard Greener
- First African-American educator to lead the Arkansas Industrial University Board of Trustees: Joseph Carter Corbin

==== 1876 ====
- First African-American to earn a doctorate degree from an American university: Edward Alexander Bouchet (Yale College Ph.D., physics; also first African-American to graduate from Yale, 1874)

==== 1877 ====
- First African-American graduate of the U.S. Military Academy: Henry Ossian Flipper

==== 1879 ====
- First African-American to graduate from a formal nursing school: Mary Eliza Mahoney, Boston, Massachusetts

=== 1880s ===
==== 1883 ====
- First known African-American woman to graduate from one of the Seven Sisters colleges: Hortense Parker (Mount Holyoke College) (Note: Parker graduated from Mount Holyoke when it was still a seminary.)

=== 1890s ===
==== 1890 ====
- First African-American woman to earn a dental degree in the United States: Ida Rollins, who earned it from the University of Michigan.

==== 1895 ====
- First African-American to earn a doctorate degree (Ph.D.) from Harvard University: W.E.B. Du Bois

== 20th century ==
=== 1906 ===
- Dr. James Robert Lincoln Diggs became the first African-American to receive a Ph.D. in Sociology from Illinois Wesleyan University, and the ninth to receive a doctorate of any kind. Diggs went on to became an influential college president, scholar, social activist, and pastor. Under his leadership, Virginia Seminary and College, now known as Virginia University of Lynchburg, a historically black college and university (HBCU), academic quality was said to be as superior as leading northern predominately white colleges and universities.

=== 1910s ===
==== 1917 ====
- First African-American to enter the University of Oregon: Mabel Byrd

=== 1920s ===
==== 1921 ====
- Three African-American women earned PhDs within nine days of each other: Georgiana R. Simpson, PhD in German Philology, University of Chicago, June 14, 1921; Sadie Tanner Mossell, PhD in Economics, University of Pennsylvania, June 15, 1921; Eva B. Dykes, PhD in English Language, Radcliffe College, June 22, 1921. Georgiana Rose Simpson was thus the first African-American woman to receive a PhD in the United States.
- First African-American to graduate from an Oregon public university: Carrie Halsell Ward (Oregon State University)

==== 1923 ====
- First African-American woman to earn a degree in library science: Virginia Proctor Powell Florence. She earned the degree (Bachelor of Library Science) from what is now part of the University of Pittsburgh.

=== 1930s ===
==== 1931 ====
- First African-American woman to graduate from Yale Law School: Jane Matilda Bolin
- First African-American to earn a Ph.D. in California (University of Southern California): Ellis O. Knox

==== 1932 ====
- First African-American Ph.D in anthropology: William Montague Cobb

=== 1940s ===
==== 1940 ====
- First African-American to earn a doctorate in library science: (Eliza Atkins Gleason, who earned it from the University of Chicago)

==== 1943 ====
- First African-American woman to earn a Ph.D. in mathematics: Euphemia Haynes, from Catholic University of America

==== 1945 ====
- First African-American woman to graduate from Columbia Law School: Elreta Alexander-Ralston

==== 1947 ====
- First African-American full-time faculty member at a predominantly white law school: William Robert Ming (University of Chicago Law School)

==== 1948 ====
- First African-American to be admitted to a traditionally white Southern university since Reconstruction: Silas Herbert Hunt, University of Arkansas.
- First African-American male to graduate from Oregon State College: William Tebeau

==== 1949 ====
- First African-American graduate of the U.S. Naval Academy: Wesley Brown

=== 1950s ===
==== 1952 ====
- First African-American to graduate from the University of Arkansas for Medical Sciences: Edith Irby Jones

==== 1956 ====
- First African-American to attend the University of Alabama: Autherine Lucy. She and Pollie Anne Myers had previously been the first black students admitted to the university, but had to undergo a three-year legal campaign to attend, and the university then found a pretext to block Myers's eventual admittance. Lucy's expulsion from the institution after a violent riot of white men against her led to the university's President Oliver Carmichael's resignation.

==== 1957 ====
- First Black American to receive an undergraduate degree from a formerly segregated Southern college or university: Gwendolyn Lila Toppin, Texas Western College of the University of Texas (now University of Texas at El Paso)

=== 1960s ===
==== 1960 ====
- First African-American to attend the William Frantz Elementary School in Louisiana, which occurred during the New Orleans school desegregation crisis on 14 November 1960: Ruby Bridges

==== 1961 ====
- First African-American to attend (and in 1965, the first to graduate) dental school at the University of Missouri–Kansas City School of Dentistry: Donald Randolph Brown, Sr.

==== 1963 ====
- First African-American to graduate from the U.S. Air Force Academy: Charles V. Bush
- First African-American to graduate from the University of Mississippi: James Meredith
- Wendell Wilkie Gunn is a retired corporate executive, a former Reagan Administration official, and the first African-American student to enroll and graduate from the University of North Alabama in 1965 (then Florence State College) in Florence, Alabama.

==== 1965 ====
- First African-American to graduate from the University of Alabama: Vivian Malone Jones

==== 1969 ====
- First African-American graduate of Harvard Business School: Lillian Lincoln

=== 1980s ===
==== 1980 ====
- First African-American woman to graduate from (and to attend) the U.S. Naval Academy: Janie L. Mines, graduated in 1980
