= Mabel Byrd =

American civil rights activist

Mabel Janet Byrd
- Born: July 3, 1895; Canonsburg, Pennsylvania, United States
- Died: May 3, 1988 (aged 92); Saint Louis, Missouri, United States
- Education: University of Oregon, 1917–1919; University of Washington, B.A., 1921
- Known for: Early civil rights activism
- Spouse: L. Symington Curtis
- Children: 2

Mabel J. Byrd (July 3, 1895 – May 20, 1988) was a civil rights activist and the first African American to enroll at the University of Oregon.

== Early life and education ==
Byrd was born in Canonsburg, Pennsylvania, in the United States on July 3, 1895. Her father Robert Byrd was a bricklayer who moved his family to Portland, Oregon when she was a youth. At the time African Americans were not allowed to own homes or even vote in Oregon. Byrd was the only student of her heritage in her Portland high school.

In 1917, she was the first African American to enroll at the University of Oregon, where she decided to major in economics. When Byrd moved to Eugene for school she was not the first African American to live in the town, as there were a few African Americans living in poverty around Alton Baker Park. Although she was able to attend the University of Oregon, state and school policies still prevented her from being able to live in the campus dormitories due to her race. She was also not allowed to join a sorority. During her time at the university, she worked as a domestic servant in the home of history professor Joseph Schafer, while also living in the home. Two years after enrolling at the University of Oregon, she transferred to the University of Washington in 1919, and in 1921 she earned a Bachelor of Arts degree in Liberal Arts.

== Early career ==
After graduating from the University of Washington in 1921, Byrd later moved back to Oregon where she became an English teacher for Portland's segregated Young Women's Christian Association. In her spare time, she served as the vice president of the local NAACP chapter. In 1923 the KKK in Eugene was extremely active, but that did not prevent sociologist and civil rights activist W. E. B. Du Bois from accepting an invitation from Byrd to speak on the campus of the University of Oregon, which led to Byrd and Du Bois forming a close friendship.

In the early days of the Harlem Renaissance, in the mid-1920s, Byrd moved to New York to train with the city's YWCA. Here she also organized events for W.E.B. Du Bois and write for his NAACP journal, The Crisis. In 1926, Byrd and fellow UO alumni met with UO president Arnold Bennett Hall to create an alumni chapter for New York City. The Alumni agreed to continue to meet and eventually became the UO Alumni Association's New York Ducks chapter.

In 1927, Byrd received a Quaker scholarship to study settlement housing in England. This was Byrd's first time traveling out of the country. To celebrate and honor Byrd, a farewell tea was held on Easter Sunday before she left. Among the 200 guests in attendance were Countee Cullen, Aaron Douglas, and Langston Hughes. Hughes even read poetry to Byrd and the crowd. While abroad, she found a position at the International Labor Organization (ILO), connected to the League of Nations, in which she researched the status of African workers in Mandate regions. She did this inspired by another Oregonian woman, Esther Lovejoy, who had earlier directed the Portland Young Women's Christian Association African American branch. Byrd's work led her to speak at the Sixth Congress of the Women's International League for Peace and Freedom in '29.

Byrd earned praise in 1933 for her work in the Census department, from Secretary of Commerce Daniel C. Roper, who called her "one of the finest and most efficient economists in the government".

== Civil rights activism ==
Byrd was an early activist in the civil rights movement, collaborating with national leaders like W. E. B. Du Bois.

In 1929 Byrd began working as a research assistant in Fisk University's sociology department. In this position, Byrd researched the quality and quantity of educational opportunities for African Americans in the South. She later worked for economist Paul Douglas at the University of Chicago. Byrd was hired under Franklin Roosevelt's National Recovery Act to "observe possible exploitation of colored workers" during the implementation of minimum wage laws.

On February 21, 1934, Byrd was barred from the Senate restaurant. Byrd and her associates were attending hearings on the Costigan-Wagner anti-lynching bill. Upon entering the restaurant, the waitress informed them, "If that woman is colored, she can't eat in here." They were later escorted off the premises by the police. Senator Royal S. Copeland stated that she was not barred because of her race, but because there were no tables available. Byrd denied this version of events saying there were plenty of tables available. Accounts from the police recall Byrd acting in a tantrum shouting and cursing when being escorted out, while Byrd's associates say she acted completely reasonably, not cursing, simply stating no crime was committed. After the fact, Copeland declared that there would be a table set aside for African Americans. Over the next few weeks, it became clear that the restaurant was making excuses to not serve African Americans. Copeland admitted that the waitress had in fact barred Byrd and not fulfilled the promise of a separate table for African Americans. He continued to deny that the restaurant publicly barred African Americans.

Byrd was the first African American woman to work for the National Recovery Administration. She was in charge of the application of new rules regarding both pay equality and fair working conditions. While in this job she faced public critique from a few news sources. Both The Washington Herald and the New York Daily News commented on her, but with very differing opinions. The Herald said she was a "shrewd economist" while the Daily News said she was labeled an "efficient, able negro woman". After only a few months, Byrd was asked to leave her position at the NRA because they did not feel it would be safe for an African American woman to do any work or establish any projects in the South. Despite all of the obstacles and hostile environments she had faced, it was decided she could not keep herself safe and do her work. She then joined the Joint Committee for National Recovery (JCNR), investigating possible hate crimes such as lynchings, as well as unsafe working conditions. With what they found through these investigations, the JCNR went before Congress and testified that despite the Roosevelt Administration's promises, all people were not being treated with equality.

In the mid-1920s, Byrd had become somewhat of an icon in the African American community. Byrd was still associated with New York's YWCA, and became the president of the Alpha Beta Chapter (currently New York Alumnae Chapter) of the Delta Sigma Theta sorority. Byrd was selected in 1927 to travel to England, where she studied settlement housing. In Europe she worked to establish herself further as an activist on racial issues. Working with the League of Nations, she rallied people during a speech to fight against racism in Prague, furthering her work as an activist. Not only was she an activist for the African American community, Byrd also fought for women's rights as a strong believer that women deserved to be treated equally with men.

In 1929, Byrd returned to America and started working for Fisk University in the sociology department, where she later almost lost her job for accusing the president of the university of discrimination against black and white professors. After working at the school and becoming involved with the NRA in the 1930s, she stepped out of public life for a while. She began working as the executive director of St. Louis' People's Art Center. However, she resigned that position after speaking out about racist actions of the organization's funding center, when she was told she needed to censure herself.

== Personal life ==
Byrd married L.S. Curtis in the mid-1930s. They had twin sons, Robert Byrd Curtis and Thomas Austin Curtis.

== Death ==
On May 20, 1988, Mabel Byrd died at the age of 92. Rather than a memorial service, Byrd requested that money be given to a scholarship fund.

== See also ==
- List of African-American pioneers in desegregation of higher education
