= Lewis Baxter Moore =

American classicist, teacher (1866–1928)

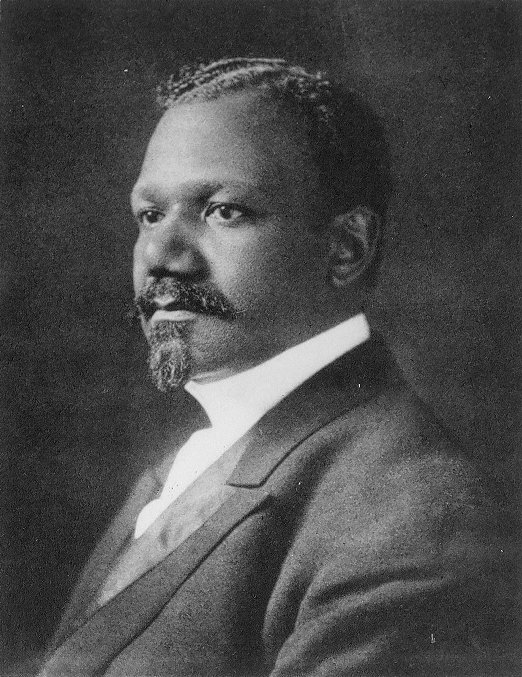
- Born: September 1, 1866; Huntsville, Alabama, United States
- Died: December 12, 1928 (aged 62); Philadelphia, Pennsylvania, United States
- Burial place: Eden Cemetery, Collingdale, Pennsylvania, United States
- Other names: Lewis B. Moore, L.B.Moore
- Education: Fisk University (BA, MA), University of Pennsylvania (PhD)
- Occupations: Classical philologist, scholar, university teacher, Presbyterian pastor
- Spouse(s): Sadie Elizabeth Tanner (m. 1895–), Lavenia E. Waring (m. 1903–)

Lewis Baxter Moore (1866–1928) was an American classicist, scholar, university teacher, and Presbyterian pastor. He was the first African American to earn a Doctor of Philosophy degree (PhD) from the University of Pennsylvania.

== Early life and education ==
Lewis Baxter Moore was born on September 1, 1866, in or near Huntsville, in Madison County Alabama, to parents Rebecca (Beasley or Love) M. and Henry Moore.

Moore received a B.A. degree (1889) and a M.A. degree (1893) from Fisk University, a HBCU in Nashville, Tennessee. His Ph.D. was received in 1896 from the University of Pennsylvania (UPenn), where he was the first African American to earn a Doctor of Philosophy degree (PhD) from the school. He graduated from the classics department at UPenn and his dissertation was entitled, “The Stage in Sophocles’ Plays.” His dissertation has been lost.

== Career ==
Moore worked at Howard University in Washington, D.C. from 1895 until 1920, and for many years as the Dean at Howard University's Teachers’ College. When they lived in Washington, D.C., his niece Sadie T. M. Alexander lived with them.

He was a member of the American Philological Association (now Society for Classical Studies), from 1896 to 1907. During these years (1896 to 1907), Moore helped with the establishment of the first "colored" branch of the YMCA in Philadelphia, known as the Christian Street YMCA.

In his later life he became an ordained minister, and for the last three years of his life he was the pastor of the Faith Presbyterian Church in Germantown, Philadelphia.

== Death and legacy ==
He died at the age of 62 on December 12, 1928, in Philadelphia, and is buried in Eden Cemetery in Collingdale, Pennsylvania.

Moore's work was included in a traveling group exhibition, "12 Black Classicists" (2003–present) presented by Prof. Michele Valerie Ronnick, from Wayne State University in Detroit. This exhibition was funded by two grants from the James Loeb Classical Library Foundation at Harvard University, and the exhibition has travelled to 79 locations across the United States, as well as the United Kingdom, and Canada.
