= John Brown Russwurm =

Americo-Liberian politician (1799–1851)

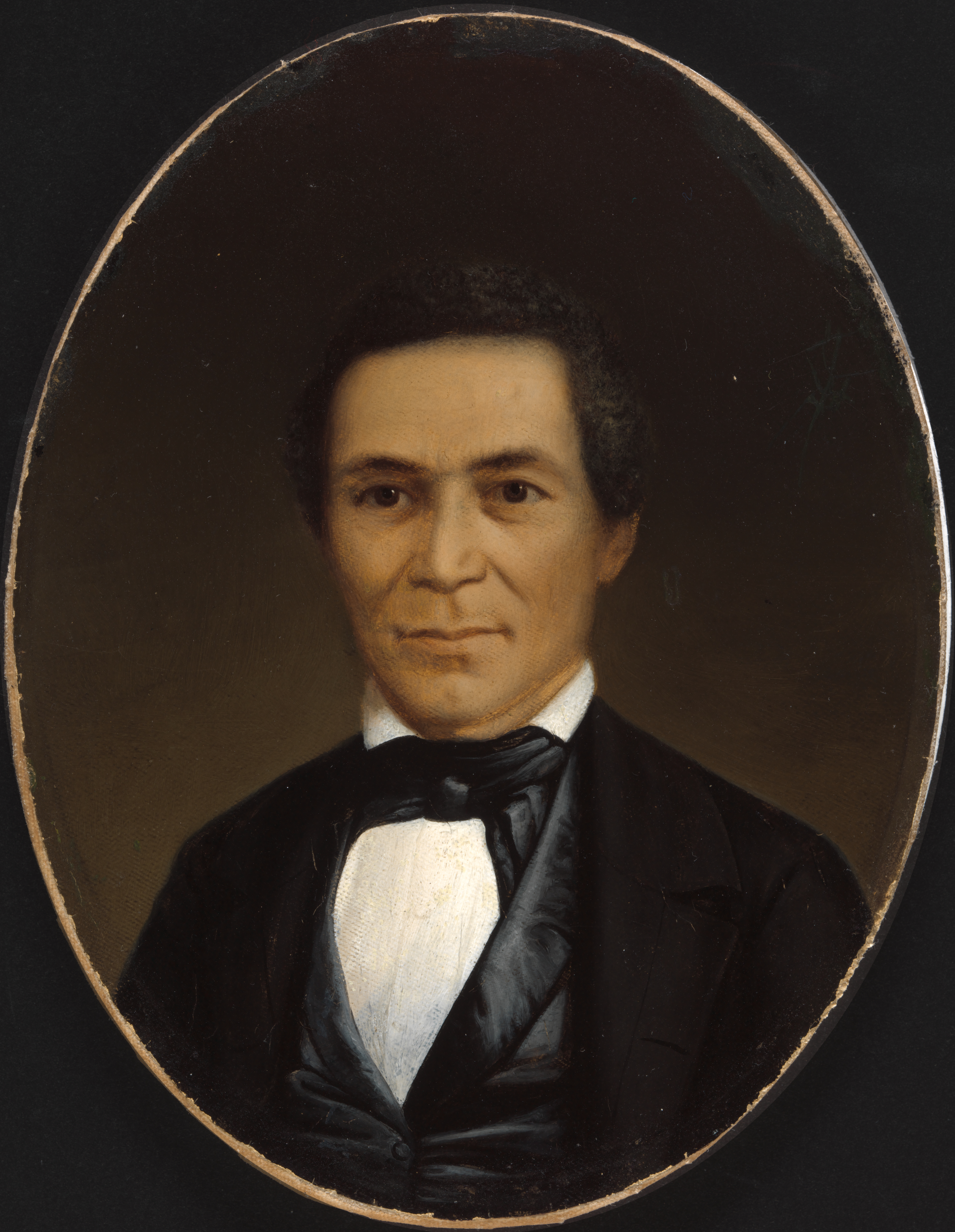
- Born: John Brown Russwurm; October 1, 1799; Port Antonio, Jamaica
- Died: June 9, 1851 (aged 51); Cape Palmas, Liberia
- Education: Bowdoin College (BA)
- Occupations: Publisher, journalist
- Notable credit(s): Freedom's Journal; Liberia Herald
- Spouse: Sarah McGill
- Children: 5

John Brown Russwurm (October 1, 1799 – June 9, 1851) was a Jamaican-born American abolitionist, newspaper publisher, and colonist of Liberia, where he moved from the United States. He was born in Jamaica to an English father and enslaved mother. As a child he traveled to the United States with his father and received a formal education, becoming the first black person to graduate from Hebron Academy and Bowdoin College.

As a young man, Russwurm moved from Portland, Maine, to New York City, where he was a founder with Samuel Cornish of the abolitionist newspaper Freedom's Journal, the first paper owned and operated by African Americans.

Russwurm became supportive of the American Colonization Society's efforts to develop a colony for African Americans in Africa, and, in 1829, he emigrated to what became Liberia. In 1836, Russwurm was selected as governor of the Republic of Maryland, a small colony set up nearby by the Maryland State Colonization Society. He served there until his death in 1851. The colony was annexed to Liberia in 1857.

== Early life ==
Russwurm was born in Port Antonio, Jamaica, in 1799, the mixed-race son of an English merchant father, John R. Russwurm, and an unknown enslaved mother. The family stayed in Jamaica until 1807, when Russwurm was sent to Quebec.

In 1812, Russwurm and his father moved to Portland, Maine (then part of Massachusetts), where the elder Russwurm married widow Susan Blanchard in 1813. (Before the marriage, Russwurm's guardian was Calvin Stockbridge.) Blanchard (now Russwurm) insisted her husband acknowledge "John Brown," as the boy was then known, and grant him his surname. He did so. "John Brown Russwurm" lived with his father, stepmother, and her children from a previous marriage, accepted as part of the family. The elder Russwurm died in 1815, but his son stayed close to his stepmother, even after she remarried (becoming Susan Hawes). The John B. Russwurm House in Portland was owned by the family. It is listed on the National Register of Historic Places.

== Education ==
Russwurm attended Hebron Academy in Maine, focusing on his studies to finish his education. He earned the nickname "Honest John". Graduating in his early twenties, he taught at an African-American school in Boston. Several years later he relocated to Maine to live with his stepmother and her new husband. They helped Russwurm pay for further education when he enrolled in Bowdoin College in 1824. Upon receiving his Bachelor of Arts degree in 1826, Russwurm became the first African American to graduate from Bowdoin College and the third African American to graduate from an American institution of higher education.

== Career ==
=== Editor of Freedom's Journal ===
Russwurm moved to New York City in 1827. The New York City at the time had the largest population of Blacks in any Northern city—an estimated 15,000, which was 10 percent of the 150,000 free "colored" people living in the North. By the early 1800s, these free Blacks and escaped slaves, who lived in a segregated world, had developed their own churches, schools and clubs. In a country that kept 90 percent of Black people in bondage, these institutions provided more than social outlets, they meant survival. On March 16 of that year, 27-year-old Russwurm, along with his co-editor Samuel Cornish, published the first edition of Freedom's Journal, an abolitionist newspaper dedicated to opposition of slavery. Freedom's Journal was the first newspaper in the United States to be owned, operated, published and edited by African Americans. During his tenure as editor, Russwurm regularly included material about ancient and modern African history, providing readers on both sides of the Atlantic with a curated source of information about the continent. The literary education Russwurm provided in the Herald also included canonical texts of English literary education. In the poetry column of this first issue, for example, he reprinted "Prediction of the Origin of Rome", an excerpt from John Ring.

When Cornish resigned from the paper in September 1827, Russwurm used his position to advocate for voluntary emigration of Black people from the United States to Africa. Although such ideas were unpopular with many in the Black leadership, and despite Russwurm's reservations about the American Colonization Society's racist tendencies, Russwurm believed that Black people were more likely to prosper in Africa than in the United States. As a result, he resigned as editor in March 1829 and emigrated to Liberia. Cornish, who rejected emigration, started a new paper, The Rights of All. Freedom's Journal may have only lasted two years, but it quickly opened the door for a wave of Black newspapers. By the time the Civil War started, there were more than 40 Black-owned and -operated newspapers in the United States.

=== Emigration to Liberia ===
Upon emigrating to Liberia, Russwurm started work as the colonial secretary for the American Colonization Society, serving from 1830 to 1834. He worked as the editor of the Liberia Herald He resigned from this post in 1835 to protest America's colonization policies. Russwurm wanted to exercise power in the political arena, and felt that Liberia offered him that opportunity while the United States did not. Furthermore, because the United States was not the land of his birth, he did not feel any strong allegiance to it. Russwurm also served as the superintendent of education in Liberia's capital, Monrovia.

In 1836 he became the first Black governor of Maryland in Africa, a colony that later became part of Liberia in 1857. He held this post until his death in Cape Palmas on June 9, 1851. He continued to encourage the immigration of African Americans to the Republic of Maryland, and supported its development of agriculture and trade. During his time in Liberia, Russwurm learned several of the native languages. He encouraged trade and diplomatic relations with neighboring countries as well as with European nations.

== Personal life and death ==
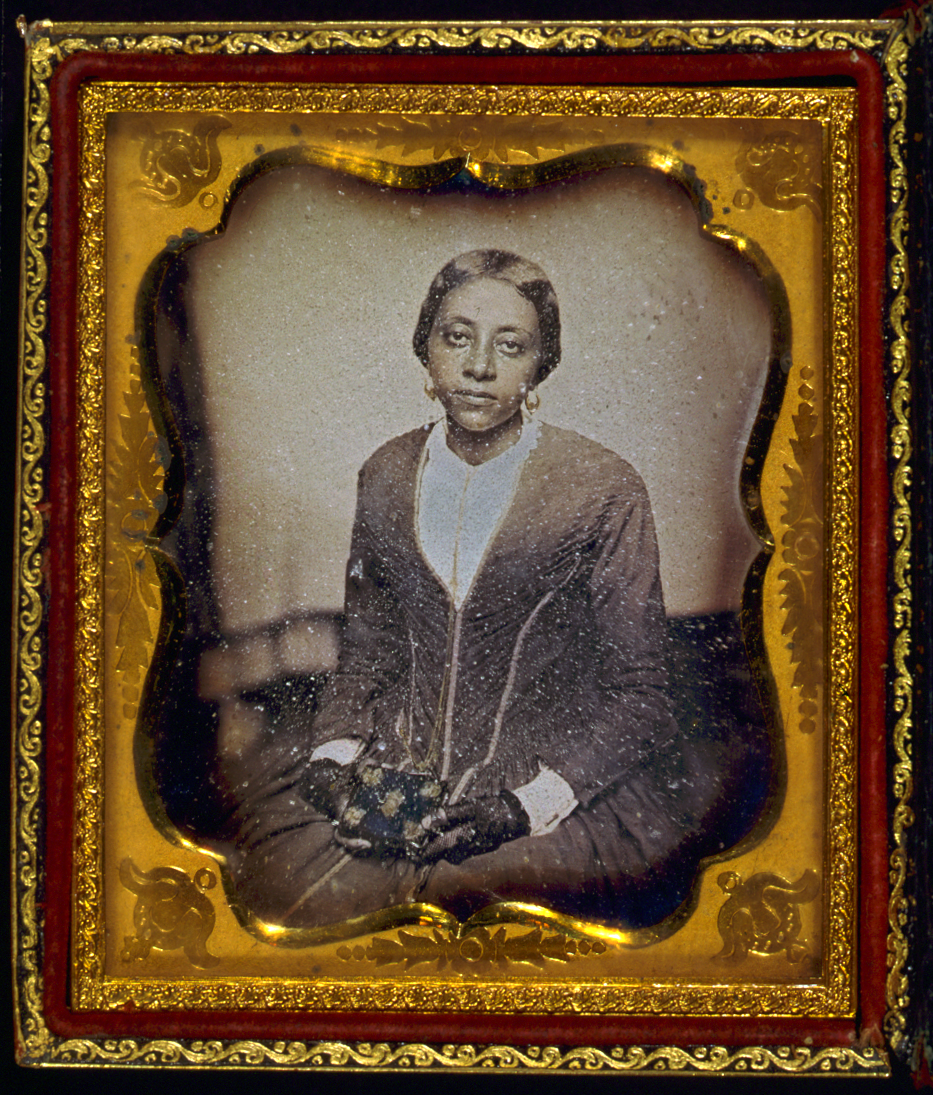
Likely Sarah McGill Russwurm

In 1833, Russwurm married Sarah McGill, daughter of the Lieutenant-Governor of Monrovia and member of the influential McGill family. The couple had a daughter and four sons.

In 1850, Russwurm returned to Maine for a visit, bringing two of his sons with him. They were enrolled at North Yarmouth Academy between 1850 and 1852, and lived with his stepmother, Susan Russwurm Hawes. He had stayed close with her after his father's death years before.

John Brown Russworm died of rheumatic fever on June 9, 1851, at the age of 51, in Cape Palmas, Liberia.

== Legacy ==
A statue of John Russwurm was erected at his burial site at Harper, Cape Palmas, Liberia. In 2002, scholar Molefi Kete Asante named John Brown Russwurm on his list of 100 Greatest African Americans. The John Brown Russwurm House at Bowdoin College was named after Russwurm in 1970, and houses the school's African American Center.

== See also ==
- Maryland State Colonization Society
- List of African-American pioneers in desegregation of higher education
- Edward Jones – first African-American graduate of Amherst, collaborated on Freedom's Journal

== Bibliography ==
- Alexander, Leslie M. African or American? Black Identity and Political Activism in New York City, 1784–1861 (University of Illinois: 2008).
- James, Winston (2010). The Struggles of John Brown Russwurm: The Life and Writings of a Pan-Africanist Pioneer, 1799–1851. New York, NY: New York University Press. ISBN 978-0-8147-4289-1.
- Sagarin, Mary, John Brown Russwurm: The story of Freedom's journal, freedom's journey, Lothrop, Lee & Shepard, 1970.
