= African Dorcas Association =

Black women's community aid society

The African Dorcas Association was a black women's community aid society founded in New York City in January 1828. The women of this group sewed clothes for New York's black children so that they would have appropriate attire for school. They were also one of the first societies where "women met independently and without the supervision of men." Through this work, the members of the African Dorcas Association hoped to make education more accessible for black youth in New York City. After just one year, this organization distributed 168 articles of clothing to school children. They became a prominent contributor to encourage young Black children to attend schools. New Yorkers surrounding the organization did not find it appropriate for black women to be educated or involved in societal issues in this way, yet, despite the opposition, the African Dorcas Association thrived. The society remained in operation into the 1830s.

== History ==
Once slavery had been abolished in New York, there was a large increase in the Black population, as a result the city leaders, both black and white realized the increasing demand to educate these children. The women in the African Dorcas Association were analyzed by a group of seven black ministers. This organization held Wednesday meetings every week and elected officer positions to lead this organization. The meetings were one of the first meetings that Black women held without the supervision of men. These meetings were held at the home of their president Margaret Francis. The clothing that they made was given to the member's children's schoolmates, neighbors, and friends. The Association also unveiled the difference in the "gender dynamic within New York's Black activist community", because it was geared towards youths, it demonstrated a motherly and nurturing form of activism, which should not be confused with sexism. The overall activities of the society reflected well on "African Ethic" in which people collectively contributed the various skills for a single cause, to help Black youth get an education. It was predetermined that a big reason why Black youth were not attending school was because they did not have adequate or even appropriate attire, this included both clothes and shoes. Especially in the winter months, the clothing that they had was old and worn and with some children having to walk several blocks to get to school it is no wonder they were missing school. The African Dorcas Association recognized this tragedy and initiated a change. They were quite successful in doing so, and it was not an organization that was solely based around money and external funds, they used their resources and found more clever ways to get things done. However, this organization came under scrutiny by the public in September 1828; however, despite these setbacks by February 1829, the women of this organization had "managed to distribute 168 articles of clothing and clothe 64 boys and girls."

== Mission ==
Work in the African Dorcas Association was in connection to religious beliefs and practices, such as doing service for others. The sole purpose of the African Dorcas Association was to "provide clothing and other necessary items for poor students who could not afford to do so." The acts of the African Dorcas Association was also representative of their "cultural practices, in which men and women performed different activities, yet everyone's contributions were seen as essential." The women of this association were able to achieve their mission by presenting these children with the clothing that then allowed them to attend school to get an education. These women ultimately achieved their mission by being able to give clothes to 64 children.

== Notable members ==
Samuel Cornish was an abolitionist and minister who helped head up the African Dorcas Association. At the time of its establishment, the association was put together by women; however, society at the time did not find that acceptable. As a result, Cornish, among a few other men, participated on the association's initial board.

Margaret Francis played a big part of the African Dorcas Association. Margaret had offered up her home as the meeting area for these women. After the group established its rapport in the community, women participants started taking more leadership in the association. As a result, Margaret Francis was eventually elected as the association's president.

Henrietta Green Regulus Ray was a very active abolitionist. In addition to her participation in other abolitionist and advocacy groups, Ray acted as the African Dorcas Association's secretary.
