= Cordelia Ray =

American poet (1852–1916)

Henrietta Cordelia Ray
- Born: August 30, 1852; New York City
- Died: January 5, 1916 (aged 63)
- Occupations: poet, teacher
- Parent(s): Charlotte Augusta Burroughs; Charles B. Ray

Henrietta Cordelia Ray (August 30, 1852 – January 5, 1916) was an African American poet and teacher. Her parents were notable abolitionists, and had worked for the Underground Railroad in Manhattan.

== Biography ==
Cordelia Ray was born in New York City, to parents Charlotte Augusta Burroughs and Charles B. Ray. She was named for her father's first wife, Henrietta Ray. She had six siblings including two sisters, Charlotte and Florence.

In 1891, Ray graduated from the University of the City of New York with a master's in pedagogy. She also studied French, German, Greek and Latin at the Saveneur School of Languages. She became a schoolteacher, but stopped teaching in order to write.

Ray's ode "Lincoln" was read at the unveiling of the Emancipation Memorial in Washington, D.C. in April 1876. A memoir of her father, written with her sister Florence, was published by J. J. Little & Co. in 1887. Her collection Sonnets was printed, also by Little, in 1893, and her Poems was published in 1910.

Ray died on January 5, 1916.

== Sonnets ==
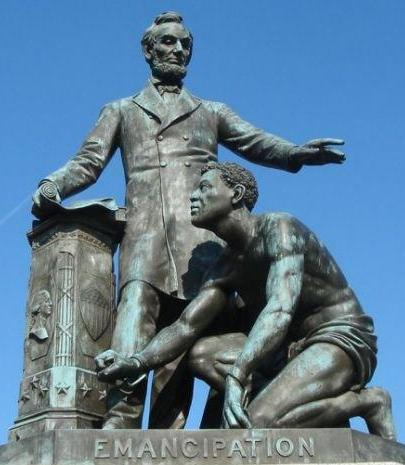
"Emancipation Memorial" (1876), in Washington, D.C.

Ray's Sonnets (1893) was a short book of 12 sonnets on Milton, Shakespeare, Raphael, and Beethoven, among other subjects. Her sonnet on the Haitian revolutionary Toussaint L'Overture is notable for its engagement in black politics (absent from her earlier verse) and for its allusions to William Wordsworth's famous sonnet "To Touissaint L'Overture":

To those fair isles where crimson sunsets burn,
We send a backward glance to gaze on thee,
Brave Toussaint! thou was surely born to be
A hero; thy proud spirit could but spurn
Each outrage on the race. Couldst thou unlearn
The lessons taught by instinct? Nay! and we
Who share the zeal that would make all men free,
Must e’en with pride unto thy life-work turn.
Soul-dignity was thine and purest aim;
And ah! how sad that thou wast left to mourn
In chains ’neath alien skies. On him, shame! shame!
That mighty conqueror who dared to claim
The right to bind thee. Him we heap with scorn,
And noble patriot! guard with love thy name.

Ray's reputation as a poet rests primarily on her early poem to Abraham Lincoln and on sonnets from her 1910 volume, which were republished widely in anthologies in the early twentieth century. Her work has been rediscovered in twenty-first-century scholarship.

== Publications ==
- Sketch of the life of Rev. Charles B. Ray. New York: Press of J.J. Little & Co., 1887
- Sonnets. New York: Press of J.J. Little & Co., 1893
- Poems. New York: Grafton Press, 1910
