= Charles Bennett Ray =

American journalist (1807–1886)

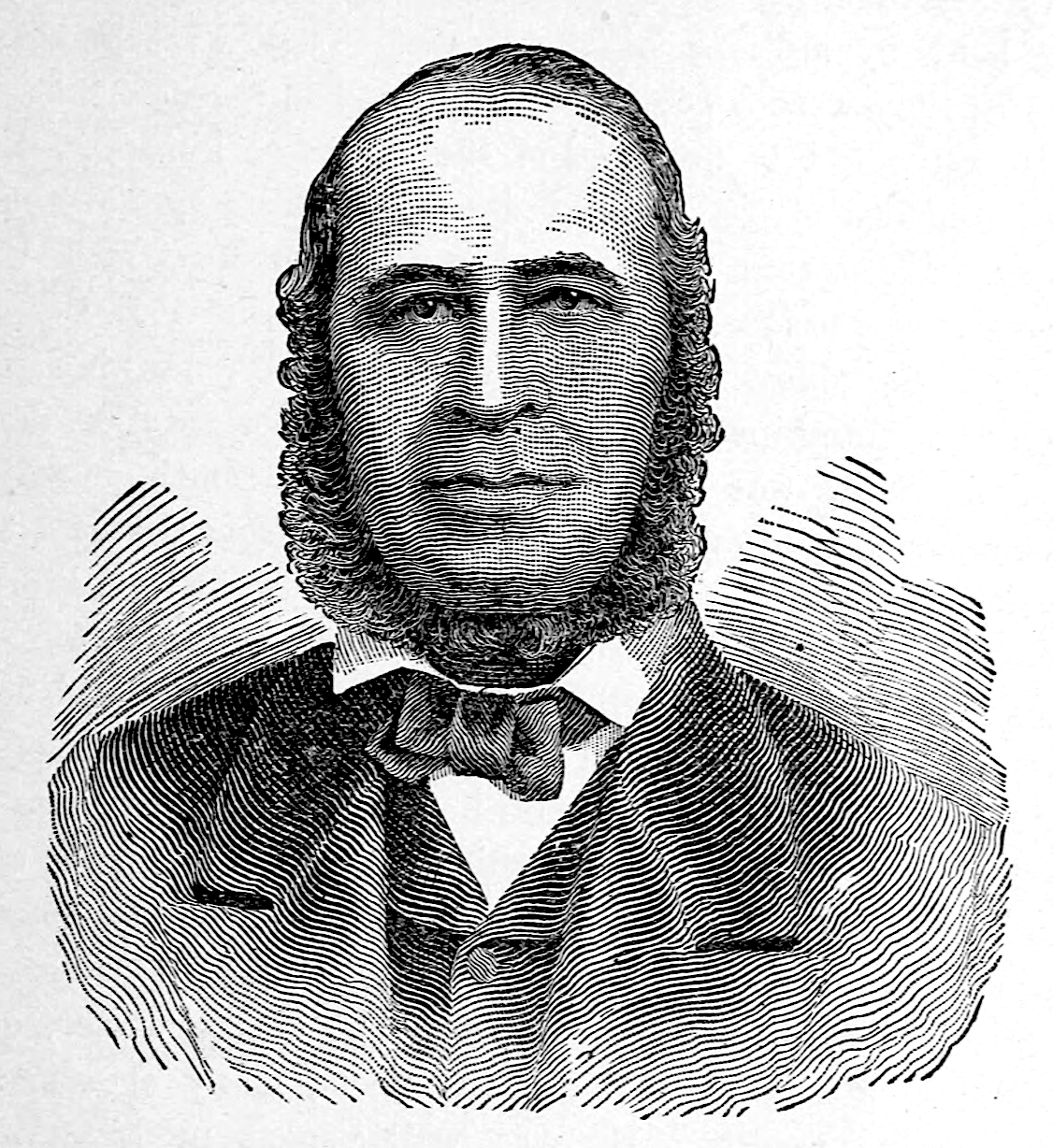
- Born: December 25, 1807; Falmouth, Massachusetts, US
- Died: August 15, 1886 (aged 78); New York City, US
- Education: Wesleyan University
- Occupations: Abolitionist, newspaper editor and owner
- Spouses: Henrietta Green Regulus (m. 1834; died 1836); Charlotte Augusta Burroughs (m. 1840)
- Children: 7, including Charlotte and Cordelia

Charles Bennett Ray (December 25, 1807 – August 15, 1886) was a prominent African-American minister and abolitionist who owned and edited the weekly newspaper The Colored American. Born in Massachusetts, he spent most of his career and life in New York City.

== Early life and education ==
Born a free man in Falmouth, Massachusetts, Ray was the son of mail carrier Joseph Aspinwall Ray and his wife Annis Harrington. He attended Wesleyan Seminary in Wilbraham, Massachusetts, studying theology. In 1832 he enrolled as the first black student at Wesleyan University in Middletown, Connecticut, although his enrollment was revoked less than two months later. White students protested his admission.

== Move to New York and ministry ==
Ray moved to New York City in 1832 and opened a boot and shoe store. He became a Methodist minister and later a Congregational minister.

Ray served as pastor of two predominantly white churches in New York City, Crosby Congregational Church and Bethesda Congregational Church. Ray was a strong supporter of the temperance movement, and was a member of the American Missionary Association, the African Society for Mutual Relief, and co-founded the Society for the Promotion of Education Among Colored Children.

== Abolitionism ==
In the early 1830s Ray became involved in the abolitionist movement, and became a prominent promoter of the Underground Railroad. He was also co-founder and director of the New York Vigilance Committee and a member of the American Anti-Slavery Society, assisting refugee slaves. Ray was also active in the Society of the Promotion of Education Among Colored Children.

== The Colored American ==
In 1838 Ray and Phillip Alexander Bell became co-owners of The Colored American, the fourth weekly periodical published by African Americans. In 1839 Ray became the sole owner and editor. The Colored American promoted "the moral, social and political elevation of the free colored people; and the peaceful emancipation of the slaves." Ray traveled throughout the North giving speeches condemning prejudice against African Americans. In 1840 he became a supporter of the newly founded Liberty Party, the only publicly pro-Abolitionist political party.

== Family ==
Ray married twice: first in 1834 to Henrietta Green Regulus, who died two years later in childbirth. He married again in 1840, to Charlotte Augusta Burroughs. They had seven children together, including Charlotte E. Ray, who became the first female African-American attorney; Florence Ray, who also became an attorney; and Cordelia Ray, who became a poet and known for her 80-line ode, "Lincoln".

Charles B. Ray died in New York City and is buried in Cypress Hills Cemetery in Brooklyn.
