= Thomas Minter =

American educator (1924–2009)

Thomas Kendall Minter (June 28, 1924 – May 22, 2009) was an education official who served in the United States government and the government of New York City.

== Biography ==
Minter was born on June 28, 1924, in the Bronx. Raised in East Harlem, he attended New York University, where he earned his undergraduate and master's degree. He later earned a master's degree from the Union Theological Seminary. Minter earned a Ph.D. from Harvard University in 1971.

His first teaching jobs were in East Harlem's junior and senior high schools. He taught in Maryland at what is now Bowie State University and became a district superintendent at the School District of Philadelphia. He was named superintendent of the public schools in Wilmington, Delaware, in 1975, where he oversaw the implementation of a court-ordered desegregation plan that involved busing students between urban and suburban districts. Minter described that the effort "isn't just a Wilmington matter, It's a national need. It goes right to the fabric of the society."

He was named as deputy commissioner of the Bureau of Elementary and Secondary Education in what was then the United States Department of Health, Education, and Welfare by HEW Secretary Joseph A. Califano, Jr. in 1977. He was selected by President Jimmy Carter in 1980 as the first assistant secretary of elementary and secondary education in the United States Department of Education.
