= The Rights of All =

19th-century abolitionist newspaper in the United States

The Rights of All (May 1829–1830) was an African American abolitionist newspaper, founded in New York City by Samuel Cornish, a black Presbyterian minister and antislavery activist. The Rights of All replaced Freedom's Journal, the nation's first African-American newspaper, which had been founded by Cornish together with John Russwurm. Cornish had resigned from Freedom's Journal after six months, and under Russwurm's sole editorship, it reversed its opposition to the American Colonization Society to become a pro-colonizationist organ, running along these lines until Russwurm moved to Liberia in late 1829. In launching The Rights of All, Cornish reemphasized the opposition to the American Colonization Society that had been a signature theme of the early months of Freedom's Journal. Yet there was a great deal of continuity between the two publications, and The Rights of All deployed the same subscription agents, including radical abolitionist David Walker, who promoted the publication in his Appeal to the Coloured Citizens of the World. Cornish estimated that The Rights of All had about 800 subscribers, but despite this robust support, the journal survived less than a year.
