= The Colored American (New York City) =

African American newspaper (1837–1842)

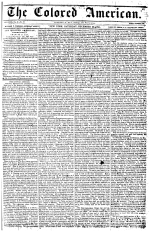
- Issue of March 4, 1837
- Type: Weekly newspaper
- Format: Tabloid
- Owner(s): Phillip Bell; Samuel Cornish; Charles Bennett Ray
- Publisher: Charles Bennett Ray
- Founded: 1837
- Ceased publication: 1842
- Language: English
- Headquarters: New York City
- OCLC number: 9858717

The Colored American was an African American newspaper published in New York City from 1837 to 1842 by Samuel Cornish, Phillip Alexander Bell, and Charles Bennett Ray. When Cornish retired, James McCune Smith joined as co-editor.

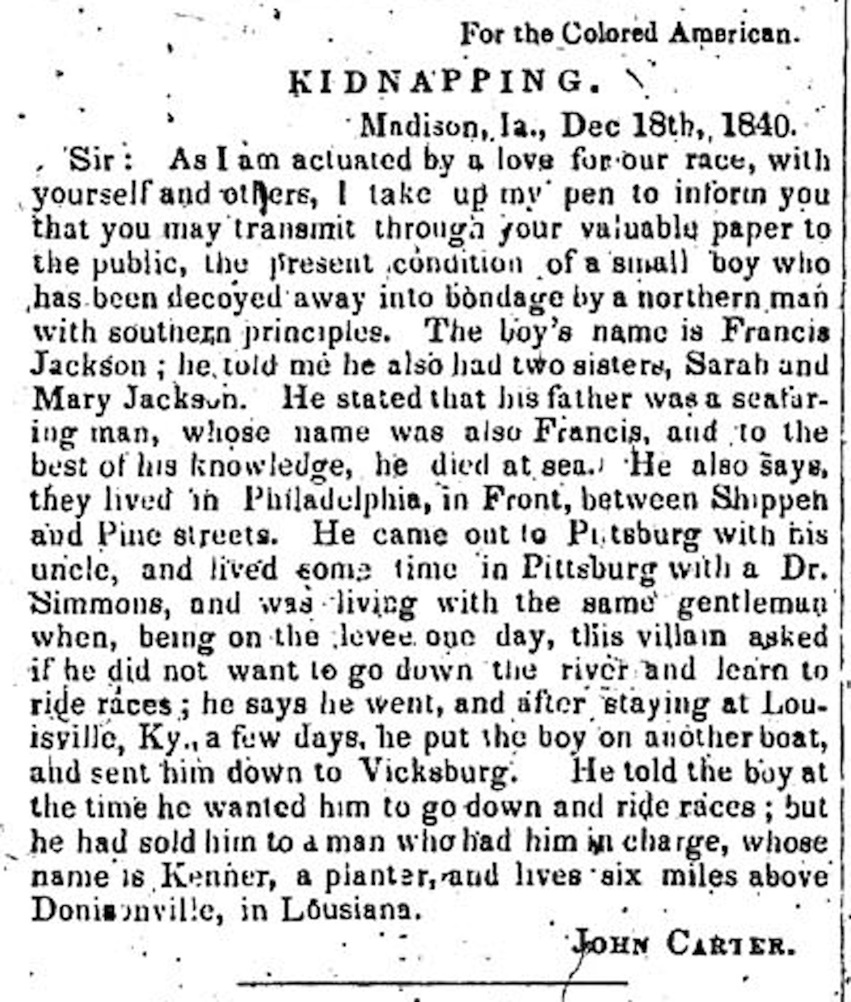
An announcement published in the newspaper

Initially published under the name The Weekly Advocate, New York's Colored American was a weekly newspaper of four to six pages. It circulated in free black communities in the Northeastern United States.

The Colored American focused on the moral, social, and political elevation of free colored people and the peaceful emancipation of slaves. The Reverend Lewis Woodson of Pittsburgh wrote a series of ten letters that were printed in the newspaper. The letters advocated elevation through the establishment of schools, newspapers, and churches by black Americans. He wrote the letters under a pen name, Augustine. After the death of abolitionist David Walker, not knowing the cause of his seemingly sudden death, several black intellectuals wrote under pen names. Historian Floyd Miller attributed the title of the "Father of Black Nationalism" to Woodson, mostly in recognition of the efficacy of the 'Augustine letters'. Woodson argued in favor of an ideology that differed from that of another black abolitionist, William Whipper. Whipper ardently favored the improvement of the conditions among black Americans, but did not favor the establishment of separate black institutions, that is black self-determination. Whipper's letters also appeared in The Colored American.

The newspaper had extensive subscribers; it engaged agents in various cities for marketing and distribution. The paper also received help from African-American churches and local abolition societies by way of fund drives and donations. Occasionally the newspaper received cash infusions from prominent white allies. All of the donations, fund drives and supplements helped the paper to publish 38 articles and survive through 1841.

== Timeline ==
- January 7, 1837 – Samuel Cornish, Phillip A. Bell, and Charles Bennett Ray launched The Weekly Advocate.
- March 4, 1837 – Publisher Robert Sears changes the name to The Colored American.
- 1839 – Bell leaves the paper and Charles Bennett Ray became the sole owner of The Colored American.
- 1840 – The Colored American declared in favor of Liberty Party candidate James G. Birney.
- December 25, 1841 – The last edition of the paper was published.

== See also ==
- The Rights of All
- Freedom's Journal
