= Samuel Cornish =

American minister and journalist (1795–1858)

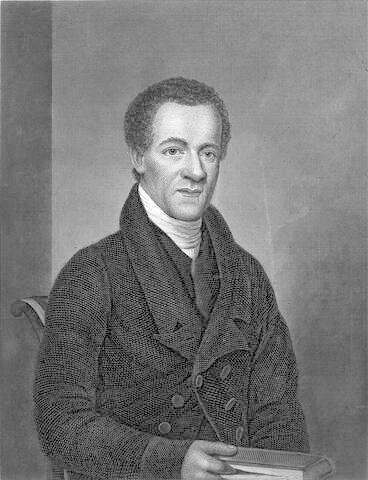
- 1825 engraving by Francis Kearney
- Born: Samuel Eli Cornish; 1795; Sussex County, Delaware, United States
- Died: November 6, 1858 (aged 62–63); Brooklyn, New York, United States
- Occupation: Journalist
- Notable credit(s): Freedom's Journal; Colored American; Rights of All

Samuel Eli Cornish (1795 – November 6, 1858) was an American Presbyterian minister, abolitionist, publisher, and journalist. He was a leader in New York City's small free black community, where he organized the first congregation of black Presbyterians in New York. In 1827 he became one of two editors of the newly founded Freedom's Journal, the first black newspaper in the United States. In 1833 he was a founding member of the interracial American Anti-Slavery Society.

== Biography ==
=== Early life and education ===
Cornish was born in Sussex County, Delaware, in 1795, to free parents of mixed race. As a young man, in 1815 he moved to Philadelphia, Pennsylvania, which had a large community of free blacks. After moving to New York City in 1856, Cornish organized the first congregation of black Presbyterians in the city.

=== Career ===
When Cornish was ordained in 1822, his parish was officially established as the New Demeter Street Presbyterian Church, making it the first black Presbyterian Church in New York City. He later ministered at the First African Presbyterian Church in Philadelphia, and Emmanuel Church in New York City. Cornish held high-ranking positions within the American Bible Society and the American Missionary Association, founded in 1846. He was one of the four founding black members; there were a total of 12 founders. He was also a member of Prince Hall Freemasonry.

In March 1827 he became one of two editors of Freedom's Journal, the first black newspaper in the United States. The other editor was John Russwurm. It was intended to serve the 300,000 free blacks in the country and especially New York's community, as well as to offset the racist commentary of local papers in the city. Cornish left the paper in September 1827, likely due to pressure from Presbyterian colleagues Samuel Miller and Archibald Alexander over attacks against the American Colonization Society by Russwurm in the paper.

During the two years Russwurm was in sole charge of Freedom's Journal, he reversed his position on colonization and lost many readers. He emigrated to Liberia in 1829. Cornish returned to the paper and tried to revive it, changing the name to The Rights of All, but the paper folded in less than a year. Cornish later was editor for the Weekly Advocate, later renamed the Colored American, from 1837 to 1839. The paper was owned by Philip Alexander Bell.

In 1833 Cornish was one of the founding members of the American Anti-Slavery Society, whose membership and leaders were interracial. He was active with them until 1840. That year, he left to join the newly formed American and Foreign Anti-Slavery Society, largely because of disputes with William Lloyd Garrison over religion in the Abolitionist movement. Cornish used his position as a journalist and editor to inform the public on the issues involving abolitionism.

=== Personal life ===
Samuel Cornish married Jane Livingston in 1824 in New York City, where he lived most of his life. The couple had four children.

Cornish died on November 6, 1858, in Brooklyn, New York. He was 63 years old.

== See also ==
- List of African-American abolitionists
