= Freedom's Journal =

First African-American owned and operated newspaper in the US (1827–1829)

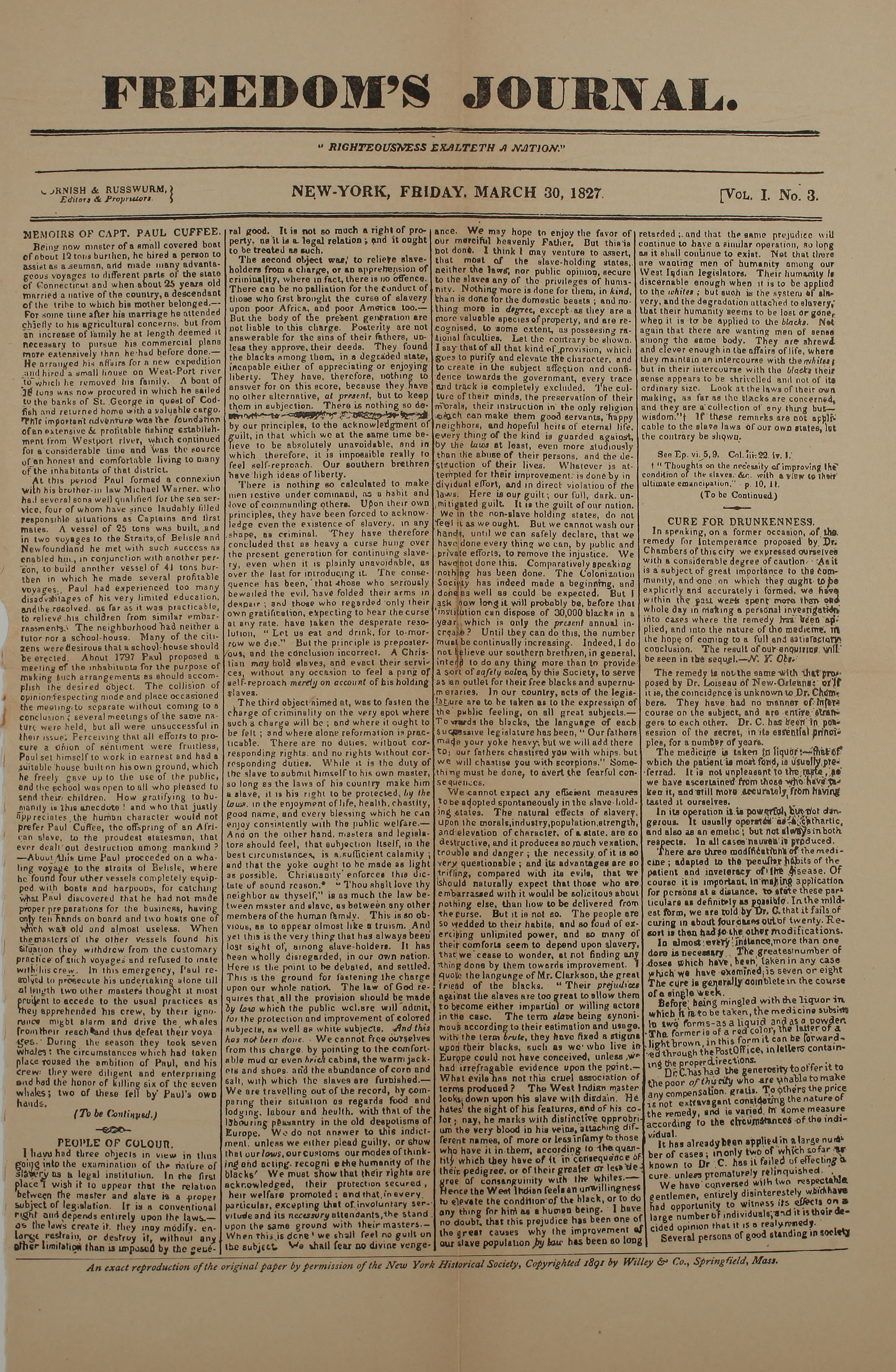
- Volume 1, no. 3, March 23, 1827
- Type: Weekly newspaper
- Format: Tabloid
- Owner(s): John Brown Russwurm; Samuel Cornish
- Publisher: Cornish & Russwurm
- Editor: John Brown Russwurm; Samuel Cornish
- Founded: March 16, 1827
- Ceased publication: March 28, 1829
- Language: English
- Headquarters: New York City
- OCLC number: 1570144

Freedom's Journal was the first African-American owned and operated newspaper published in the United States. Founded by Rev. John Wilk and other free Black men in New York City, it was published weekly starting with the March 16, 1827, issue. Freedom's Journal was superseded in 1829 by The Rights of All, published between 1829 and 1830 by Samuel Cornish, the former senior editor of the Journal. The View covered it as part of Black History Month in 2021.

== Background ==
The newspaper was founded by John Wilk, Peter Williams, Jr., and other leading free Blacks in New York City, including orator and abolitionist William Hamilton. The first publication, on March 16, 1827, advertised Freedom's Journal for $3 (~$85.00 in 2025) per year, distributed each Friday at No. 5 Varick Street, New York City. At this time, journals became an important aspect of the African-American protest tradition, arguing for sociopolitical uplift within the community. The founders intended to appeal to free Blacks throughout the United States, who were desperately attempting to elevate their literacy rate and finding some success at that.

During this time, the free Black American population in the U.S. was about 300,000. The largest population of free Black Americans after 1810 was in the slave state of Maryland, as slaves and free Blacks lived in the same communities. In New York State, a gradual emancipation law was passed in 1799, granting freedom to enslaved children born after July 4, 1799, after a period of indentured servitude into their 20s. In 1817, a new law was adopted, which quickened the emancipation process for virtually all who remained in slavery. The last slave was freed in 1827.

By this time, the United States and Great Britain had banned the African slave trade in 1808. But, slavery was expanding rapidly in the Deep South, because of the demand for labor to develop new cotton plantations there; a massive forced migration had been under way as a result of the domestic slave trade, as slaves were sold and taken overland or by sea from the Upper South to the new territories.

== History ==
The newspaper founders selected Samuel Cornish and John Brown Russwurm as senior and junior editors, respectively. Both men were community activists: Cornish was the first to establish an African-American Presbyterian church and Russwurm was a member of the Haytian Emigration Society. This group recruited and organized free Blacks to emigrate to Haiti after its slaves achieved independence in 1804. It was the second republic in the Western Hemisphere and the first free republic governed by Blacks.

According to the nineteenth-century African-American journalist, Irvine Garland Penn, Cornish and Russwurm's objective with Freedom's Journal was to oppose New York newspapers that attacked African Americans and encouraged slavery. For example, Mordecai Noah wrote articles that degraded African Americans; other editors also wrote articles that mocked Blacks and supported slavery. The New York economy was strongly intertwined with the South and slavery; in 1822, half of its exports were cotton shipments. Its upstate textile mills processed southern cotton.

The abolitionist press had focused its attention on opposing the paternalistic defense of slavery and the Southern culture's reliance on racist stereotypes. These typically portrayed slaves as children who needed the support of Whites to survive or who were ignorant and happy as slaves. The stereotypes depicted Blacks as inferior to Whites and a threat to society if free.

Cornish and Russwurm argued in their first issue: "Too long have others spoken for us, too long has the public been deceived by misrepresentations". They wanted the newspaper to strengthen the autonomy and common identity of African Americans in society. "We deem it expedient to establish a paper", they remarked, "and bring into operation all the means with which out benevolent creator has endowed us, for the moral, religious, civil and literary improvement of our race".

In its "Summary" and "Domestic News" sections, Freedom's Journal published crimes committed almost entirely by White people, showing an attempt to undo associations of Black people with criminality. The paper linked criminality to Whiteness, typically taking a full column of the newspaper to report on previously published crimes throughout the entire nation. The White crimes reported were violent and serious: murder, and in the North, kidnapping. Freedom's Journal juxtaposed White victims of White criminal offenses with enslaved victims of White crime, creating a counter-discourse to the association of Black Americans with inherent lawlessness. For example, the April 27, 1827, issue of Freedom's Journal lists three murders in its "Summary" section:

"Randall W. Smith of Lexington, Ken. has been tried, and found guilty of manslaughter and sentenced to the penitentiary seven years, for killing Dr. Brown. He is to be tried for shooting a Mr. Christopher at the same fire"; "A woman of the name of Hanford, with one of her sons, has been committed to prison in Wilton, Conn. on a charge of having murdered another son"; and "The Frankfort, (Ky.) Argus, of the 4th inst. contains an advertisement offering a reward of $200 for the apprehension of Ewing Hogan, who was murdered by John Wells. One item is worthy of notice in the description of Hogan—a part of his nose has been bitten off!"

The "Summary" and "Domestic News" sections disappeared, however, after Samuel Cornish left the paper in 1827, signaling a larger shift in the paper all together.

Freedom's Journal provided international, national, and regional information on current events. Its editorials opposed slavery and other injustices. It also discussed current issues, such as the proposal by the American Colonization Society (ACS) to resettle free Blacks in Liberia, a colony established for that purpose in West Africa. Freedom's Journal printed two letters written by preeminent Black American leaders of the time, both in opposition to the aims of the ACS. One man was the head of the African Methodist Episcopal Church (AME), Richard Allen, whose letter appeared in November 1827 and the other was the Reverend Lewis Woodson, also associated with the AME, whose letter appeared in January 1829. Allen's letter was reprinted later, as part of David Walker's Appeal.

The Journal published biographies of prominent Blacks, and listings of the births, deaths, and marriages in the African-American community in New York, helping celebrate their achievements. It circulated in 11 states, the District of Columbia, Haiti, Europe, and Canada.

The newspaper employed 14 to 44 subscription agents, such as David Walker, an abolitionist in Boston.

== Samuel Cornish (1795–1858) ==
Born in Sussex County, Delaware to free Black parents, Samuel Cornish was a founder and coeditor of Freedom's Journal. He studied at Philadelphia's Free African School and went on to become the first African American to complete the difficult process of becoming a Presbyterian minister. He completed his ministerial training with the Philadelphia Presbytery and was ordained in 1822. From there, he moved back to New York and established the first Black Presbyterian Church in the city.

Samuel Cornish was a firm advocate for the full liberty of African Americans in the North and the abolition of slavery in the South. Cornish, along with a group of other African-American activists, assembled at the home of community organizer Boston Crummell to create Freedom's Journal which would serve as a voice for the African-American community in New York City. Cornish would serve as senior editor for the publication.

Cornish left the Freedom's Journal after only six months of editing the paper. Reportedly, Samuel Cornish took issue with junior editor John B. Russwurm's stance on the issue of colonization. Cornish was in opposition of free Black Americans emigrating to U.S.-controlled Liberia. Russwurm, on the other hand, supported the American Colonization Society's mission to transport free African Americans to Liberia. After Russwurm's departure from Freedom's Journal in 1829, Cornish briefly returned to the paper, renamed The Rights of All. The publication officially shut down in 1830.

== John Brown Russwurm (1799–1851) ==
Junior editor John B. Russwurm was born in 1799 to an enslaved Black woman and a White American merchant in Port Antonia, Jamaica. His father, considering his son to be a free citizen, enrolled young Russwurm in a Canadian boarding school in Montreal. His father would later move to Portland, Maine and remarry a White woman, Susan Blanchard, who saw step-son Russwurm as a full part of her family. After his father's death in 1815, Blanchard ensured that Russwurm would complete his secondary education at Hebron Academy in Maine. When Susan Blanchard remarried, both she and her new husband oversaw Russwurm's admission to Bowdoin College in 1824. There, John B. Russwurm became the second known African American to earn a bachelor's degree from a U.S. university.

After graduation, John B. Russwurm moved back to New York City to become an activist for antiracism and abolition. He was appointed the role of junior editor of Freedom's Journal only a year after receiving his degree. After Cornish left the paper, Russwurm began to promote colonization in Africa for American free Blacks, as proposed by the American Colonization Society. His readers did not agree and abandoned the paper. He served as an editor at Freedom's Journal until 1829 when he announced he would be moving to Liberia.

In Liberia, Russwurm first served as the superintendent of schools and the editor of the Liberia Herald. He later became the governor of Liberia's Maryland Settlement in 1836. It seemed to Russwurm that there was a genuine opportunity for African Americans to put racial prejudice behind them in Liberia, allowing for the creation of an equitable and viable society.

== "Theresa" ==
Freedom's Journal went beyond international and national news as an abolitionist newspaper—it published poetry, fiction, lectures, and summaries of conversations and conferences. "Theresa- A Haytian Tale" is probably the first published piece of short fiction by an African-American author. The author only went by the designation "S.", leaving scholars to deliberate the true identity of the writer. "Theresa" was published between January 18 and February 15, 1828.

"Theresa" is set during the Haitian Revolution between 1791 and 1803. The story centers around the experiences of three fictional women: Madame Paulina, the mother, and Amanda and Theresa, her two daughters. When Theresa's father and uncle die in the fight, Madame Paulina dresses as a French officer and takes her daughters along disguised as prisoners in a journey to safety. Along the way, Theresa overhears information that could secure success for the Haitian revolution by saving the lives of Toussaint L'Overture and his men. With a female protagonist of African descent, the story shows bravery, heroism and an idealized depiction of Black womanhood which was largely absent from fiction of the time.

The April 6, 1827, April 20, 1827, and May 6, 1827, issues all included history of Haiti and the Haitian revolution. Freedom's Journal showed that the American Revolution and the Haitian Revolution were equally important to an African-American identity.

== See also ==
- List of African-American firsts
