= Nelly (given name) =

- Gender: Primarily female
- Language: English

Other names
- Alternative spelling: Nellie
- Related names: Helen, Ellen, Eleanor, Danielle, Nelson

Nelly and Nellie are female given names, also used as nicknames, which are derived from the names Helen, Ellen, Petronella, Danielle, Cornelia, Eleanor, Janelle, Chanelle, Penelope, Elizabeth, Rachel, Natalie or Noelia.

== Women with the name ==
- Nelly Artin Kalfayan (born 1949), Egyptian-Armenian entertainer, actress and presenter
- Nellie Mae Abrams (1946–2005), American artist
- Nelly Aerts (born 1962), Belgian marathon runner
- Nelly Aginian (born 1981), Armenian chess player
- Nelly González Aguilar (born 1977), Mexican politician
- Nellie Ahlberg (died 1976), American politician
- Nelly Akopian-Tamarina (1941–2025), Russian pianist
- Nelly Garzón Alarcón (1932–2019), Colombian nurse and teacher
- Nelly Alard, French actress, screenwriter and novelist
- Nelly Alisheva (born 1983), Russian volleyball player
- Nellie B. Allen (1874–1961), American landscape architect
- Nellie Anderson (1870–1960), American film and stage actress
- Nellie Greenwood Andrews (1864–1958), Canadian suffragist
- Nelly Arcan (1973–2009), Canadian writer, born Isabelle Fortier
- Nelly Arno (1892–1966), British actress
- Nellie Ashford, American visual and folk artist
- Nelly Attar, Lebanese/Saudi Arabian mountaineer
- Nellie Bly Baker (1893–1984), American actress
- Nelly Banco (born 1986), French sprinter
- Nellie Bancroft (1887–1950), British botanist
- Nelly Barkan (born 1973), Israeli tennis player
- Nelly Barnet (born 1951), Cuban volleyball player
- Nellie Barsness (1873–1966), American physician
- Nellie Bellflower (born 1946), American actress and voice artist
- Nelly Beltrán (1925–2007), Argentine actress, born Nélida Dodó López Valverde
- Nelly Ben Hayoun-Stépanian, French designer, artist and filmmaker
- Nelly Ben-Or (born 1933), Polish concert pianist and professor
- Nellie Geraldine Best (1905–1990), American artist
- Nellie Peters Black (1851–1919), American women’s rights activist
- Nelly Petkova (born 1960), Russian journalist
- Nelly Blair (1759–1820), later Nelly Smith, sometimes suggested as being Scottish poet Robert Burns' first love (see also Nelly Kilpatrick)
- Nellie Bly (1864–1922), American journalist
- Nelly Bodenheim (1874–1951), Dutch illustrator
- Nelly Borgeaud (1931–2004), French actress
- Nellie Boswell (1858 or 1859–1938), British equestrian performer
- Nellie Bowles, American journalist
- Nellie H. Bradley (c.1838–1927), American writer of plays and songs in support of the temperance movement
- Nellie Bramley (1890–1982), British actress and singer
- Nellie Breen (1897–1986), American actress
- Nelly Brennan (1792–1859), historical figure on the Isle of Man
- Nellie Briercliffe (1889–1966), English singer and actress
- Nellie Rathbone Bright (1898–1977), American educator, poet and author
- Nellie Brimberry, American postmistress
- Nelly Bromley (1850–1939), English actor and singer
- Nellie A. Brown (1876–1956), American botanist
- Nellie A. Buchanan (1900–1993), American educator and theatre professional
- Nellie Moyer Budd (1860–1944), American music teacher
- Nelly Buntschu (born 1947), Swiss politician
- Nellie Marie Burns (ca. 1850–1897), American actor and poet
- Nellie T. Bush (1888–1963), Arizona state legislator and justice of the peace
- Nellie Bushell (1884–1948), Irish textile artist and political activist
- Nelly Byl (1919–2011), Belgian lyricist
- Nellie Cameron (c. 1910–1953), Australian prostitute
- Nellie Campobello (1900–1986), Mexican ballet dancer
- Nelly Campos (born 1967), Mexican politician
- Nellie Carlin, American attorney
- Nellie Carrington (1916–1998), British high jumper
- Nellie Cashman (1845–1925), American gold prospector
- Nellie Casman (1896–1984), Russian-born American actress and singer
- Nelly Reig Castellanos (1929–2021), First Lady of Paraguay
- Nellie E. Pooler Chapman, American dentist
- Nelly Chávez (born 1945), Bolivian marathon runner
- Nelly Chepchirchir (born 2003), Kenyan athlete
- Nelly Ciobanu (born 1974), Moldovan singer
- Nellie Clifden, 19th-century actress and royal mistress
- Nellie Coad (1883–1974), New Zealand teacher, community leader, women’s advocate and writer
- Nellie Weldon Cocroft (1885–1986), American composer
- Nelly Commergnat (1943–2021), French politician
- Nellie Connally (1919–2006), First Lady of Texas (1963–1969)
- Nelly Cormon (1877–1942), French actress
- Nellie Cornish (1876–1956), American artist
- Nelly Corradi (1914–1968), Italian opera singer and actress
- Nellie Cournoyea (born 1940), Canadian politician
- Nellie Cressall (1882–1973), British suffragette and labor activist
- Ellen Crocker (1872–1962), also known as 'Nellie' or 'Nelly', British suffragette
- Nellie Tenison Cuneo (1869–1953), British illustrator and painter
- Nelly Daldovo, Argentine politician
- Nellie Dale (1865–1967), British school teacher
- Nelly Danielyan (born 1978), Armenian painter
- Nellie Mighels Davis (1844–1945), American journalist, civic leader and newspaper publisher
- Nelly Carrillo Tarazona de Espinoza (1927–2017), Peruvian herpetologist
- Nelly de Rooij (1883–1964), Dutch zoologist and herpetologist
- Nelly de Vogüé (1908–2003), French writer and aristocrat
- Nelly Degouy (1910–1979), Belgian painter
- Nellie Jane DeWitt (1895–1978), American nursing administrator
- Nellie Dick (1893–1995), Russia-born anarchist educator, emigrated to England and then the United States
- Nelly Diener (1912–1934), Swiss flight attendant
- Nellie B. Eales (1889–1989), British zoologist and university teacher
- Nelly Erichsen (1862–1918), English painter and illustrator
- Nellie Blessing Eyster (1836–1922), American journalist, writer, lecturer and social reformer
- Nellie Farren (1848–1904), English actress and singer
- Nellie Fassett, American feminist, political organizer and suffragist
- Nelly Fišerová (1905–1941), Czech chess player
- Nellie Ivy Fisher, British industrial chemist working in Australia
- Nellie Flynn (1881–1982), Australian Aboriginal leader
- Nellie Fong (born 1949), Hong Kong politician and chartered accountant
- Nellie Griswold Francis (1874–1969), African-American suffragist and civil rights activist
- Nelly Frijda (born 1936), Dutch actress, voice actress, cabaret artist and former politician
- Nelly Furtado (born 1978), Canadian singer-songwriter, instrumentalist, and record producer
- Nelly Garnier (born 1985), French politician
- Nellie Gatehouse (1886–1972), Australian amateur golfer
- Nellie Huntington Gere (1868–1949), American painter and illustrator
- Nellie Gifford (1880–1971), Irish republican activist and nationalist
- Nelly Glauser (born 1966), Swiss long-distance runner
- Nellie Godfrey, English suffragette
- Nelly Goedewaagen (1880–1953), Dutch artist
- Nellie Esther Goldthwaite, American food chemist
- Nelly Sfeir Gonzalez (1930–2020), American librarian and bibliographer
- Nellie Gorbea (born 1967), Secretary of State of Rhode Island
- Nellie Gould (1860–1941), Australian nurse
- Nellie Grant (1855–1922), daughter of President Ulysses S. Grant
- Nellie Gray (disambiguation), multiple people
- Nellie Gubler (1908–2007), American Mormon genealogist
- Nelly Guilbert (born 1979), French footballer
- Nelly Armande Guillerm, birth name of Violette Verdy (1933–2016), French ballerina, choreographer, teacher, dance company director and writer
- Nellie Hall (1893–1976), British suffragette
- Nellie Halstead (1910–1991), English track and field athlete
- Nellie Shaw Harnar (1905–1985), American historian and educator
- Nellie X. Hawkinson (1886–1971), American nurse and nursing educator
- Nellie Lathrop Helm (1859–1940), American author
- Nellie Hepburn-Edmunds (1879–1953), British painter
- Nellie Hermann, American writer
- Nellie A. Hope (1864–1918), American violinist, music teacher, orchestra conductor
- Nellie Mathes Horne, American painter
- Nellie Hutton (1875–1955), New Zealand painter
- Nellie Ibbott (1889–1970), Australian mayor
- Nellie Ionides (1883–1962), English collector, connoisseur, and philanthropist
- Nelly Jepkosgei (born 1991), Kenyan-born middle-distance runner
- Nellie Jimmie, American politician and community leader
- Nellie Stone Johnson (1905–2002), American civil rights activist
- Nelly Joy, American singer-songwriter
- Nelly Kamwelu, Tanzanian model and beauty pageant titleholder
- Nelly Kaplan (1931–2020), Argentine-born French filmmaker
- Nelly Karim (born 1974), Egyptian actress, model, and ballerina
- Nellie Keeler (1875–1903), American circus performer
- Nellie Kennedy, Canadian politician
- Nellie Kershaw (c.1891–1924), British asbestosis victim
- Nelly Kilpatrick, later Nelly Bone (1759–1820), possibly Robert Burns' first love and muse (see also Nelly Blair)
- Nellie Kim (born 1957), Soviet gymnast
- Nellie Augusta Knopf (1875–1962), American artist
- Nelly Bell Knutsen (1905–1991), Norwegian politician
- Nelly Korda (born 1998), American golfer
- Nelly Korniyenko (1938–2019), Soviet and Russian actress
- Nellie Kusugak, Canadian educator and researcher
- Nelly Láinez (1920–2008), Argentine comedic actress
- Nellie Lamport (c. 1889/1890 – 1969), Australian actress
- Nelly Landry (1916–2010), French tennis player, 1948 French Open champion
- Nelly Las (born 2007), English footballer
- Nellie Latrielle, Jamaican political activist
- Nellie Neal Lawing, Alaskan frontierswoman, roadhouse operator and hunter
- Nellie Ramsey Leslie, American teacher and composer
- Nellie Liang (born 1958), American economist
- Nelly Litvak, Russian and Dutch applied mathematician
- Nellie Longsworth (1933–2021), American historian
- Nelly Hooper Ludbrook (1907–1995), Australian paleontologist and geologist
- Nellie Lutcher (1912–2007), American R&B and jazz singer
- Nellie Maas, Dutch figure skater
- Nellie Madison (1895–1953), American murderer
- Nelly Makdessy (born 1979), Lebanese musician
- Nellie V. Mark (1857–1935), American physician and suffragist
- Nelly Nichol Marshall (1845–1898), American author
- Nellie Martel (1855–1940), English-Australian suffragist
- Nelly Martyl (1884–1953), French opera singer
- Nellie Constance Martyn (1887–1926), Australian businesswoman
- Nelly Mazloum (1929–2003), Egyptian actress, choreographer, dancer and dance teacher
- Nelly Mbangu, Congolese women’s and children’s rights activist
- Nellie McClung (1873–1951), Canadian feminist, politician, and social activist
- Nellie McCoy (1883–1961), American actress
- Nellie McCredie, Australian architect
- Nellie McHenry (1853–1935), American stage actress
- Nellie McKay (born 1982), British-born American singer-songwriter and actress
- Nellie Y. McKay (1930–2006), African-American studies scholar
- Nellie Meadows (1915–2006), American painter
- Nelly Meden (1928–2004), Argentine actress
- Nellie Melba (1861–1931), Australian opera soprano
- Nellie Lisa Melles, 2nd Baroness Burton (1873–1962), British aristocrat
- Nellie Star Boy Menard (1910–2001), American quiltmaker
- Nelly Meruane (1927–2018), Chilean actress and teacher
- Nellie Burget Miller (1875–1952), American poet, writer, clubwoman, and lecturer
- Nellie Miller (born 1988), American barrel racer
- Nellie Miller-Mann (1897–1997), American missionary
- Nelly Miricioiu (born 1952), British opera soprano
- Nellie Brown Mitchell (1845–1924), American singer
- Nelly Moenne-Loccoz (born 1990), French snowboarder
- Nelly Montiel (1919–1951), Argentine film actress
- Nelly Moore (1844–1869), English actress
- Nelly Moretto (1925–1978), Argentine composer
- Nellie Morrice (1881–1963), Australian army and bush nurse administrator
- Nelly Mugo, Kenyan scientist
- Nelly Mukazayire, Rwandan economist
- Nelly Littlehale Umbstaetter Murphy (1867–1941), American artist
- Nellie Murray, American chef
- Nelly Mutti (born 1956), Speaker of the National Assembly of Zambia
- Nelly Naumann (1922–2000), German Japanologist
- Nellie Navette (1865–1936), British music hall sério-comic performer
- Nellie May Naylor (1885–1992), American chemist
- Nellie Neilson (1873–1947), American historian
- Nelly Neppach (1898–1933), German tennis player
- Nellie B. Nicholson (1888–1965), African-American suffragist and educator
- Nelly Nicol, American politician
- Nelly Núñez (1948–2021), Bolivian politician
- Nellie Ó Cléirigh (1927–2008), Irish lace authority and historian
- Nelly O'Brien (1864–1925), Irish miniaturist, landscape artist and Gaelic League activist
- Nelly Ognyanova (born 1956), Bulgarian legal scholar
- Nelly Olin (1941–2017), Minister of Environment in France (2005–07)
- Nelly Omar (1911–2013), Argentine actress and singer
- Nellie Evans Packard, American singer
- Nellie Morrow Parker (1902–1998), African-American school teacher
- Nellie M. Payne (1900–1990), American entomologist and agricultural chemist
- Nelly Hurtado Pérez (born 1975), Mexican politician
- Nelly Petkova (born 1983), Bulgarian singer
- Nellie Arnold Plummer (1860–1933), American former slave, teacher and biographer
- Nellie Pou (born 1956), American politician
- Nelly Power (1854–1887), English singer and actress
- Nelly Prono (1926–1997), Paraguayan actress
- Nellie Quander (1880–1961), American labor leader
- Nellie Yip Quong, Canadian midwife, feminist and social activist
- Nelly Ramassamy (born 1983), French artistic gymnast
- Nelly Rangelova (born 1958), Bulgarian pop singer
- Nelly Reifler, American novelist
- Nelly Restar (1939–2021), Filipino sprinter
- Nellie Revell (1873–1958), American journalist, novelist, publicist, vaudeville performer, screenwriter and radio broadcaster
- Nelly Richard (born 1948), Chilean art critic
- Nelly Rivas (1939–2012), mistress of Juan Perón
- Nellie Roberts (1872–1959), British botanical artist
- Nellie Robinson (educator) (1880–1972), Antiguan teacher and school founder
- Nellie Robinson (politician) (1915–1992), first woman mayor in Queensland, Australia
- Nelly Rodrigues (born 2003), Portuguese footballer
- Nelly Rosario, Dominican-American novelist
- Nellie Tayloe Ross (1876–1977), first American woman state governor
- Nelly Roussel (1878–1922), French activist
- Nellie Mae Rowe (1900–1982), African-American artist
- Nellie Pratt Russell (1890–1979), American incorporator of Alpha Kappa Alpha sorority
- Nelly Sachs (1891–1970), German poet and dramatist awarded the 1966 Nobel Prize for Literature, born Leonie Sachs
- Nellie Tayloe Sanders, American politician
- Nellie R. Santiago (born 1943), New York state senator
- Nelly Sauter (1959–2021), Swiss footballer
- Nelly Schreiber-Favre (1879–1972), Swiss lawyer
- Nellie Schroder, New Zealand teacher and community leader
- Nellie Sengupta (1886–1973), English-Indian politician
- Nelly Sethna (1932–1992), Indian weaver
- Nellie Ellen Shepherd (1877–1920), American painter
- Nelly Shin, Canadian politician
- Nellie Showalter (1870–1946), American chess player
- Nelly Shulman, Russian rabbi
- Nelly Sindayen (1949–2009), Filipino journalist
- Nellie Bangs Skelton (1855–1911), American composer, pianist, singer and vocal coach
- Nellie Small, Australian nightclub entertainer, jazz and blues singer
- Nellie von Gerichten Smith (1871–1952), American musician
- Nellie King Solomon, American contemporary painter
- Nellie Nugent Somerville (1863–1952), American politician
- Nellie Parker Spaulding (1870–1945), American actress
- Nellie Spicer (born 1987), American volleyball player
- Nellie Spindler (1891–1917), English nurse
- Nellie George Stearns (1855–1936), American artist and teacher of art
- Nellie Cline Steenson (1885–1984), American politician
- Nellie Strong Stevenson (1856–1930), American pianist
- Eleanor Nellie Stewart (1858–1931), Australian actress and singer
- Nellie Stewart (politician) (1882–1946), American politician
- Nellie Stockbridge (1868–1965), American photographer
- Nellie Elizabeth Stronach (1892–1991), Australian army officer
- Nelly Such (born 1992), Hungarian handballer
- Nelly Syro (born 1953), Colombian swimmer
- Nelly Tagar (born 1982), Israeli actress and stand-up comedian
- Nelly Tchayem (born 1983), French triple jumper
- Nellie Teale (1900–1993), American naturalist
- Nelly Ternan or Nelly Robinson, names used for Ellen Ternan (1839–1914), English actress, mistress of Charles Dickens
- Nelly Thüring (1875–1972), Swedish politician, one of the first women elected to the Swedish parliament
- Nelly Toll (1932–2021), Polish Jewish artist, writer and teacher
- Nelly McKenzie Tolman, American painter
- Nelly Trumel (1938–2018), French painter and radio presenter
- Nellie Twardzik (1919–2013), American baseball player
- Nelly Uchendu, Nigerian singer and composer
- Nellie Unthank (1846–1915), British-born American Mormon pioneer, Utah settler, and amputee
- Nelly van Bommel, French choreographer
- Nelly van Doesburg (1899–1975), Dutch painter
- Nellie van Kol (1851–1930), Dutch feminist, educator, and children's author
- Nelly Vargas (born 1959), Mexican politician
- Nelly Viennot (born 1962), French football referee
- Nelly Vuksic (born 1938), Argentinian conductor and singer
- Nellie Craig Walker, American school teacher, business owner and the first African-American student
- Nellie Walker (1874–1973), American sculptor
- Nelly Walker, birth name of Nella Larsen (1891–1964), American modernist novelist
- Nellie Wallace (1870–1948), British music hall performer
- Nellie Taraba Wallberg (born 2007), Swedish tennis player
- Nellie Weekes (1896–1990), Barbadian nurse, midwife, politician and women’s rights activist
- Nelly Weissel (1920–2010), Uruguayan actress
- Nellie Whichelo (1862–1959), British head designer of the Royal School of Art Needlework
- Nelly Wicky (1923–2020), Swiss Labour Party politician and former member of the Swiss National Council
- Nelly Wies-Weyrich (1933–2019), Luxembourgish archer
- Nellie Zabel Willhite (1892–1991), American deaf aviator
- Nelly Williams (born 1980), Trinidadian cricketer
- Nelly Winters, Canadian artist
- Nellie Choy Wong, Chinese pharmacist and cookbook author
- Nellie Wong (born 1934), American poet
- Joanna Ellen Wood (1867–1927), Canadian novelist, sometimes known as Nelly Wood
- Nellie Yarborough (1925–2012), African-American Pentecostal bishop, pastor, and community activist
- Nellie Snyder Yost (1905–1992), American historian
- N. Louise Young (1907–1997), American physician
- Nellie Yu Roung Ling (1889–1973), Chinese dancer and lady-in-waiting in Qing imperial court
- Nelly Márquez Zapata (born 1964), Mexican politician

== Men with the name ==
- Nellie Briles (1943–2005), American baseball player
- Nelly Cruz (born 1980), Dominican-American professional baseball player
- Nellie Fox (1927–1975), American professional baseball player
- Nelly, stage name of American rapper Cornell Iral Haynes Jr.
- Nelly Junior Joseph (born 2001), Nigerian basketball player
- Nellie King (1928–2010), American baseball player and radio announcer
- Nellie Metcalf (1890–1982), American football player, coach, and administrator
- Don Nelson (born 1940), American basketball coach and player nicknamed "Nellie"
- Nellie Pott (1899–1963), American baseball player
- Nellie Rodríguez (born 1994), American professional baseball player

== Fictional characters ==
- Nellie, subject of the 1956 song "Nellie the Elephant" and Nellie the Elephant (TV series)
- Nelly, the legal guardian and 'aunt' to Vladimir Tod in The Chronicles of Vladimir Tod written by Heather Brewer
- Nellie Bertram, a character from The Office (U.S.), played by Catherine Tate
- Nellie Brie, from the film An American Tail: The Mystery of the Night Monster
- Nellie Crain, from the Netflix limited series The Haunting of Hill House, played by Victoria Pedretti
- Nelly Dean, in Emily Brontë's novel Wuthering Heights
- Nellie Forbush, heroine of the Rodgers and Hammerstein musical South Pacific
- Nellie Gray, ally of The Avenger
- Nellie O'Malley, a character from the American Girl series
- Nelliel Tu Odelschwanck, known as Nel Tu, a small, good-natured, character in the manga Bleach
- Nellie Oleson, from the Little House on the Prairie children's books and TV series
- Nellie Pledge, a fictional character in the Granada Television series Nearest and Dearest, played by Hylda Baker
- Nel Rawlison, in Henryk Sienkiewicz's novel In Desert and Wilderness
- Nelly the protagonist of the armor games game plaftformer adventure game Nelly

== See also ==
- Nella
- Nell
- Nelson
