= Nellie Quander =

American labor leader

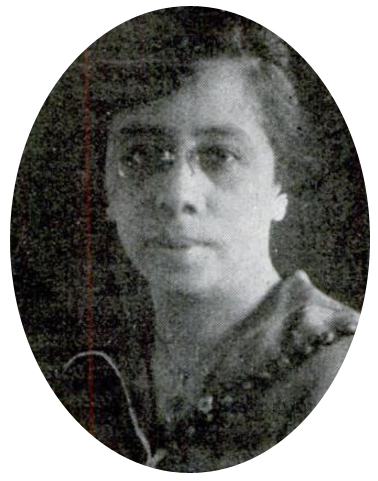
- Nellie Quander, Incorporator of Alpha Kappa Alpha; teacher; civic activist
- Born: Nellie May Quander; February 11, 1880; Washington, D.C.
- Died: September 24, 1961; Washington, D.C.
- Relatives: Susie Russell Quander (sister)

Nellie May Quander (February 11, 1880 - September 24, 1961) was an incorporator and the first international president of Alpha Kappa Alpha sorority. As president for several years, she helped expand the sorority and further its support of African-American women at colleges and in communities. The sorority established a scholarship endowment in her name.

Quander served as an educator in Washington, DC public schools for 30 years. Early in her career, she earned an M.A. at Columbia University. Later she earned a degree in social work at New York University, plus a diploma at the University of Uppsala, Sweden.

She was a leader in civic and community affairs, where she served on the board of directors at the YWCA and YMCA, as executive secretary at the Miner Community Center, as well as in leadership positions with the Women's Trade Union League and other groups.

== Family and early life ==
Nellie May Quander was born in Washington, D.C. to John Pierson Quander and Hannah Bruce Ford Quander. The Quander family can trace their lineage three hundred years in Maryland and Virginia. They are considered to be one of oldest free African-American families whose ancestors had once been enslaved in America.

Her father was a descendant of Nancy Quander, one of the slaves freed by President of the United States George Washington in his last will and testament. In addition, Nellie's mother was a relative of West Ford, a freed mulatto and supposed son of George Washington. From his personal knowledge, West Ford informed the Mount Vernon Ladies Association about Mount Vernon Plantation's interior for later restoration. The association bought Mount Vernon during the 1850s for preservation.

During her early years, Nellie Quander attended Washington, D.C.'s public schools. She graduated from Miner Normal School with honors. It was established in 1851 as the Normal School for Colored Girls to train teachers. She also farmed. She was very active in the church and community life and the superintendent at Lincoln Church.

== Howard University ==
When Quander entered Howard University, only 1/3 of 1% of African Americans and 5% of whites attended any college. While enrolled at Howard University, Quander also taught students at the Garrison School in Washington D.C.'s public school system.

In June 1912, she graduated with a Bachelor of Arts degree, magna cum laude, in history, economics, and political science.

== Incorporation of Alpha Kappa Alpha Sorority, Incorporated ==
Quander became a member of Alpha Kappa Alpha at Howard in 1910. She was elected as the chapter's president. On October 11, 1912, there was a regular meeting of the Alpha Kappa Alpha sorority. During the meeting, a few members of the organization were voting to change the name, symbols, and different standards. Quander appealed to them to honor the vows they had taken just months earlier but the girls did not agree. She was said to be "horrified" at the proposal and gave the women who disagreed with her a deadline to terminate the efforts of reorganizing the sorority. After the young women withdrew Quander began contacting graduate members to fully establish the incorporation of the sorority that began years before.

Quander, along with Minnie Smith, Norma Boyd, Julia Evangeline Brooks, Nellie Pratt Russell and Ethel Jones Mowbray moved to incorporate Alpha Kappa Alpha on January 29, 1913. With Quander's help, Alpha Kappa Alpha was nationally incorporated in Washington, D.C., as a non-profit under the name Alpha Kappa Alpha Sorority, Incorporated on January 29, 1913.

== Presidency 1913-1919 ==
After leading the initiative to incorporate the sorority, Quander served as president of Alpha Kappa Alpha. In 1913, at the first Boulé at Howard, she was officially elected president. After having served six years, at the next Boulé in 1919 at Chicago, Illinois, she resigned. During her tenure, she wrote the constitution's preamble and appointed fellow members to implement the sorority's expansion. Later, Quander was selected as the first director of the North Atlantic Region of AKA.

Quander established the first Alpha Kappa Alpha scholarship for a senior with the highest grade point average in the School of Liberal Arts. The recipient received a ten dollar gold prize. She also expanded the sorority's undergraduate chapters. She assisted fellow founder Beulah Burke to establish Beta chapter in Chicago, Illinois; Gamma Chapter at the University of Illinois at Urbana-Champaign; and Delta chapter at the University of Kansas. Quander was the sole founder of Zeta chapter at Wilberforce University.

== Career ==
After graduation, Quander became an educator for the public school system in Washington, D.C., where she served generations of students for 30 years. Because the District was run as part of the Federal government, African-American teachers in the public schools were paid on the same scale as whites. The system attracted many outstanding teachers. From 1914 to 1915, Quander studied at Columbia University to earn her Master of Arts degree. Later she pursued additional post-graduate degrees (see below).

From 1916 to 1917, Quander was a special field agent for the Children's Bureau for the Department of Labor. In this position, she observed the social and economic structure of mentally handicapped people in New Castle County, Delaware. The study was sponsored by the local Women's Club to prepare to establish an institution for the mentally handicapped.

Quander furthered her education by attaining a degree in social work at New York University, and studied economics for two summers at the University of Washington.

In 1936, Quander earned a diploma at Uppsala University in Uppsala, Sweden. She attended the International Conference on Social Work in London, England during the same year. In the public schools, Quander established and supported the School Safety Patrol Unit for twenty-five years.

== Civic activities ==
Quander demonstrated leadership at the YWCA, where she was a board member and chairman of the young women's department. She was a member of the board of directors of the Business Professional and Industrial Committee in the Phillis Wheatley YMCA.

Quander was the national industrial field secretary in work related to unions. She was a delegate for unions related to education and the Women's Trade Union League.

She served as executive secretary of Miner Community Center, which served women and children. She also was secretary of the trustee board of Lincoln Temple Congregational Church, thus among the group that led the operations and financial affairs of the church.

== Legacy and honors ==
In 1984 at Alpha Kappa Alpha's Diamond Jubilee Boulé, Esther Garland Polard, a trustee of Howard University, established a scholarship endowment in Quander's honor. The total amount of the scholarship was $125,000. It is awarded to Howard University junior and senior students.

Quander devoted her life to education and civic activities. She was close to her surviving sister Susie Russell Quander (member of Zeta Phi Beta - Alpha Chapter), nephews and friends. She died on September 24, 1961.
