= Susie Russell Quander =

American clubwoman

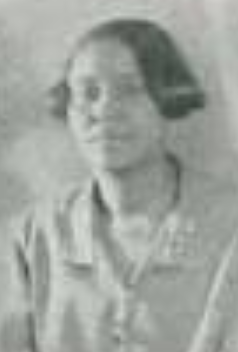
- Susie Russell Quander, from the 1926 yearbook of Howard University
- Born: September 20, 1882; Washington, D.C., United States
- Died: May 1973 (aged 90); Philadelphia, Pennsylvania, United States
- Occupation: Clubwoman
- Relatives: Nellie Quander (sister)

Susan "Susie" Russell Quander (September 20, 1882 – May 1973) was an American educator, churchworker, and clubwoman. She worked with Carter G. Woodson and Charles H. Wesley on running the Association for the Study of Negro Life and History (ASNLH) and coordinating Negro History Week events across the United States.

== Early life and education ==
Susan Russell Quander was born in Washington, D.C., one of the nine children of John Pearson Quander and Hannah Bruce Ford Quander. Her father served in the Union Army in the American Civil War. Her older sister was educator and clubwoman Nellie Quander. She was a member of the extended Quander family. She graduated from Howard University in 1926. At Howard she was a member of Zeta Phi Beta.

== Career ==
Quander taught in the public schools in Washington for many years. From 1926 to 1938, she was secretary to historian and journalist Carter G. Woodson. She worked with local groups across the United States for the Association for the Study of Negro Life and History (ASNLH) and especially on coordinating the association's Negro History Week events. She encouraged ASNLH members to hold fundraising drives and establish sustaining life memberships to support the organization.

In 1941, she and her sister were among the 700 Black women who attended a tea at the White House, for a program of the National Council of Negro Women, co-hosted by Mary McLeod Bethune and Eleanor Roosevelt. She was active in the NAACP in Washington. and remained active with Zeta Phi Beta through her adult years.

Later in life, Quander lived in Cleveland and Philadelphia, and was an instructor affiliated with the Women's Society of Christian Service. She taught school in Cleveland, and was secretary of Missionary Education at Cora Church in Cleveland.

== Personal life ==
Quander died in 1973, aged 90 years, in Philadelphia, Pennsylvania.
