= Gladys Quander Tancil =

American tour guide at Mount Vernon (1921–2002)

- Born: January 31, 1921; Washington, D.C., U.S.
- Died: November 5, 2002 (aged 81); Alexandria, Virginia, U.S.
- Education: Armstrong High School; Miner Teachers College
- Known for: Historical interpretation
- Spouse: Herbert Pike Tancil III (m. 1943; div. 1952)
- Family: Quander

Gladys Rebecca Quander Tancil (January 31, 1921 – November 5, 2002) was an American tour guide who was the first African-American to work as a historical interpreter at George Washington's Mount Vernon. She worked to improve the interpretation surrounding the slaves that Washington owned.

== Quander family history ==
Gladys Quander Tancil is part of the Quander family, believed to be the oldest documented African-American family in the United States. Several of Gladys Quander Tancil's ancestors were slaves at Mount Vernon. Sukey Bay lived and worked at River Farm, one of George Washington's farms adjacent to the main mansion. One of her daughters, Nancy Quander, worked as a spinner on George Washington's plantation, Mount Vernon.

Tancil's mother, Alice Cordelia Smith, also worked at Mount Vernon from 1930 to 1962. Smith, her sister, and their aunt worked as house cleaners, a role that Tancil shared before becoming an interpreter.

== Career ==
Tancil's first career was in government service, first in the Office of Emergency Management and then the Bureau of Printing and Engraving, and the Navy Department.

After her retirement in 1975, she returned to Mount Vernon to work as a part-time historical interpreter, which is what she is known for. From 1975 to 1994, she was the only Black interpreter on staff.

Tancil was one of the staff members to lead the "Slave Life" tour at Mount Vernon beginning in April 1995. This tour focused on the lives of people like Nancy Quander and included places where slaves lived and worked on the plantation, such as the salt house and spinning room. Tancil was not the only one to give these tours, but she was frequently requested by visitors.
