= Julia Evangeline Brooks =

American academic (1882–1948)

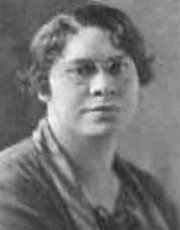
- Born: June 1882; New Orleans, Louisiana, US
- Died: November 24, 1948; Washington, D.C., US
- Occupations: incorporator of Alpha Kappa Alpha sorority; Assistant principal and dean of girls at Dunbar High School in Washington, D.C.
- Parent(s): Walter Henderson Brooks and Eva Holmes Brooks

Julia Evangeline Brooks (June, 1882 – November 24, 1948) was an incorporator of Alpha Kappa Alpha, the first sorority founded by African-American women.

Having earned a B.A. degree at Howard University and M.A. at Columbia University, Brooks was a devoted educator for the rest of her life. She worked most of her working life at Dunbar High School in Washington, DC. She was an assistant principal there for 26 years, and also served as Dean of Girls.

== Early life ==
Brooks was one of ten children born to Walter Henderson Brooks and Eva (Holmes) Brooks in New Orleans, Louisiana. Her father, enslaved as a child, grabbed the chance for education, earning B.A. and theology degrees from Lincoln University in Oxford, Pennsylvania in 1873. He became the pastor of Nineteenth Street Baptist Church in Washington, DC.

During her youth, Brooks attended public schools in Washington, D.C. Brooks was enrolled at Sumner Magruder Elementary School and M Street High School (also known as Dunbar High School).

After graduating high school, Brooks enrolled in Miner Normal School, a training school for teachers. She taught primary school for a few years, then Brooks went on to Howard University for more education.

== College life and incorporation of Alpha Kappa Alpha ==
Brooks was one of several members who were early supporters of the idea of incorporating Alpha Kappa Alpha to provide for its future expansion. As a result, Brooks, Nellie Quander, Norma Boyd, Nellie Pratt Russell, Minnie B. Smith and Ethel Jones Mowbray incorporated Alpha Kappa Alpha on January 29, 1913. Brooks and the other incorporators, were listed by name in Article Four of the sorority's Certificate of Incorporation. After incorporation, Brooks served as treasurer of the directorate until 1923.

== Career and later life ==
After graduation from Howard University with a B.A. degree in 1916, Brooks was qualified to teach at the high school level. She taught Spanish and English for six years at Washington D.C.'s Dunbar High School. Brooks went on to graduate study during summers at Columbia University in New York City and received her Master of Arts in 1928.

Brooks devoted her life to education. Beginning in 1922, Brooks was promoted to assistant principal at Dunbar High School. Brooks served in this position for 26 years, through the rest of her life. She was also appointed Dean of Girls.

Brooks directly assisted six nieces and nephews with obtaining a college education by support, taking them to special events, tutoring when necessary, and contributing financially.

She was a charter member of Xi Omega chapter of Alpha Kappa Alpha in Washington, D.C., established in 1923. Brooks wrote an early history of the sorority, which she gave at the 1923 Boulé in Baltimore, Maryland. At Founders' Day at Xi Omega on January 30, 1924, the history was presented as a lecture.

Brooks died on November 24, 1948.
