= Riley oxidation =

Chemical reaction

Named after	Harry Lister Riley
Reaction type	Organic redox reaction

The Riley oxidation is a selenium dioxide-mediated oxidation of methylene groups adjacent to carbonyls. It was first reported by Harry Lister Riley and co-workers in 1932. In the decade that ensued, selenium-mediated oxidation rapidly expanded in use, and in 1939, Andre Guillemonat and co-workers disclosed the selenium dioxide-mediated oxidation of olefins at the allylic position. Today, selenium-dioxide-mediated oxidation of methylene groups to alpha ketones and at the allylic position of olefins is known as the Riley Oxidation.

== Mechanism ==
The mechanism of oxidation of −CH_{2}C(O)R groups by SeO_{2} has been well investigated. The oxidation of carbonyl alpha methylene positions begins with attack by the enol tautomer at the electrophilic selenium center. Following rearrangement and loss of water, a second equivalent of water attacks the alpha position. Red amorphous selenium is liberated in the final step to give the 1,2-dicarbonyl product.

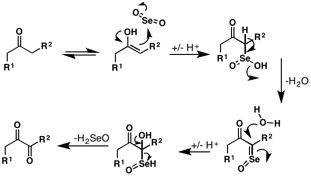

Allylic oxidation using selenium-dioxide proceeds via an ene reaction at the electrophilic selenium center. A 2,3-sigmatropic shift, proceeding through an envelope-like transition state, gives the allylselenite ester, which upon hydrolysis gives the allylic alcohol. The (E)- orientation about the double bond, a consequence of the envelope-like transition state, is observed in the penultimate ester formation, is retained during the hydrolysis step giving the (E)-allylic alcohol product.

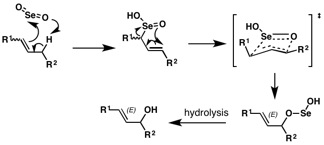

== Scope ==
The Riley Oxidation is amenable to a variety of carbonyl and olefinic systems with a high degree of regiocontrol based on the substitution pattern of the given system.

Ketones with two available α-methylene positions react more quickly at the least hindered position.:

Allylic oxidation can be predicted by the substitution pattern on the olefin. In the case of 1,2-disubstituted olefins, reaction rates follow CH > CH_{2} > CH_{3}:

Geminally-substituted olefins react in the same order of reaction rates as above:

Trisubstituted alkenes experience reactivity at the more substituted end of the double bond. The order of reactivity follows that CH_{2} > CH_{3} > CH:

Due to the rearrangement of the double bond, terminal olefins tend to give primary allylic alcohols:

Cyclic alkenes prefer to undergo allylic oxidation within the ring, rather than the allylic position at the sidechain. In bridged ring systems, Bredt’s rule is followed and bridgehead positions are not oxidized:

== Applications ==
In their strychnine total synthesis, R.B. Woodward and co-workers leveraged the Riley Oxidation to attain the trans-glyoxal. Epimerization of the alpha hydrogen led to cis-glyoxal, which spontaneously underwent cyclization with the secondary amine to yield dehydrostryninone.

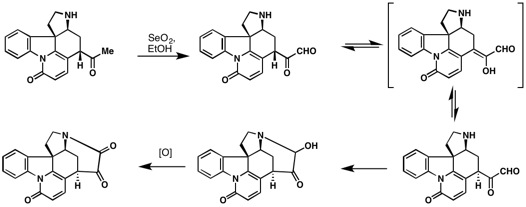

Selenium-dioxide mediated oxidation was used in the synthesis of the diterpenoid ryanodol.

Selenium dioxide mediated allylic oxidation to access ingenol.

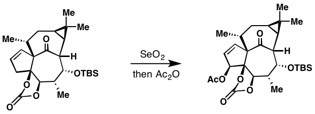
