= Judith DeCordova =

Jamaican political activist and feminist

Judith DeCordova (1877–1967) was a Jamaican political activist and feminist. She was a pioneer within the struggle for women's suffrage in Jamaica.

She belonged to a Jewish upper-class family of Jamaica.

She was a pioneer within infant welfare on Jamaica and president of the Child Welfare Association.

In 1918 she became the co-founder and later the second president of the Women's Social Service Association (WSSA). She and Nellie Latrielle were leading figures in the campaign conducted by the WSSA to introduce women's suffrage, which had been introduced in Britain in 1918, also on Jamaica, a campaign which succeeded in 1919.

In 1936, she founded and became the first president of the Jamaica Women's League.
