= Harry Lister Riley =

British chemist

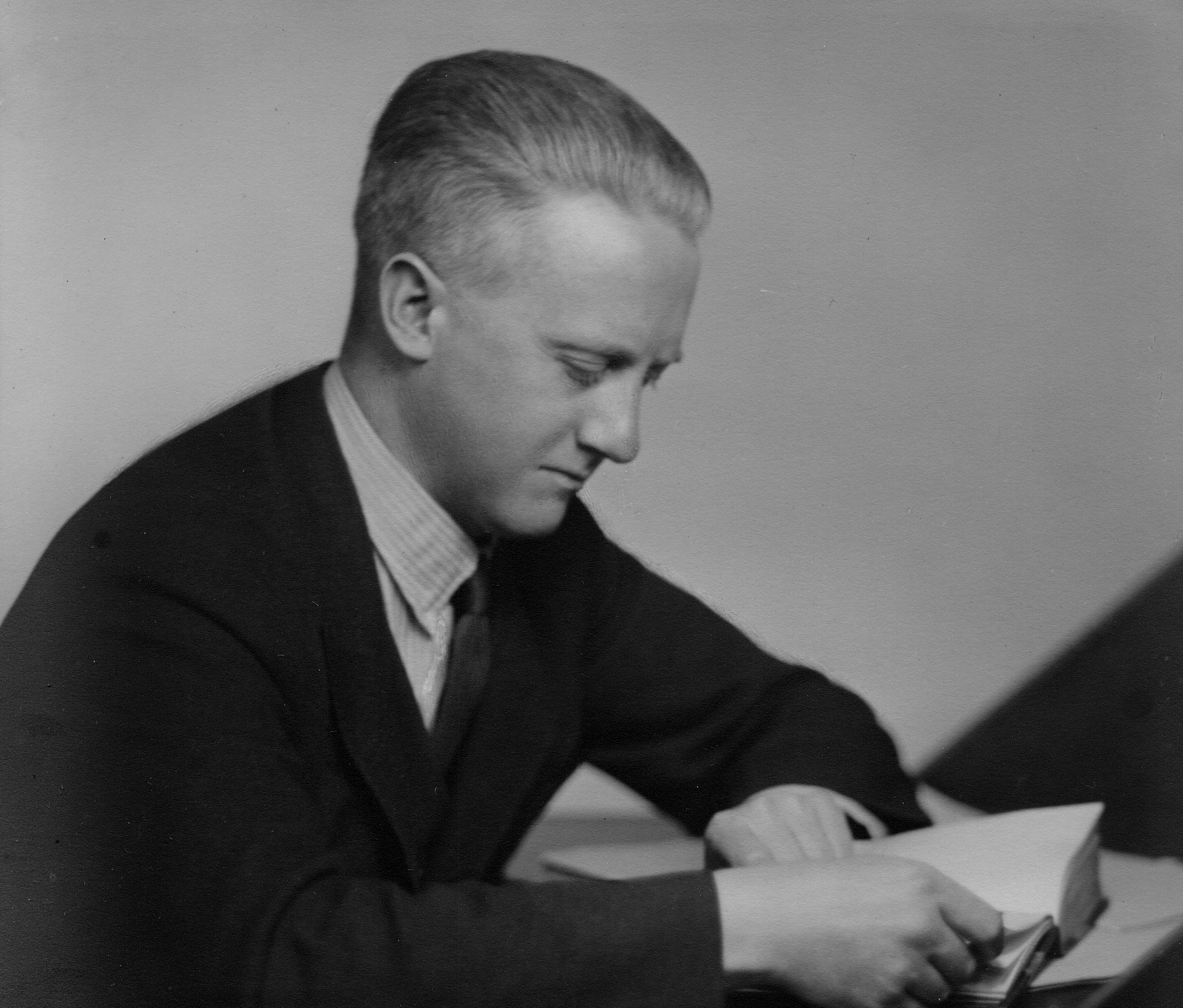
Harry Riley at work, circa 1935

Harry Lister Riley (1899–1986) B.Sc., ARCS, DIC DS was a British chemist based in London and Newcastle, where he undertook research into coke and coal. His 1932 work on selenium dioxide as a postdoctoral student at Imperial College earned him attention, as well as the naming of the Riley oxidation. He was Professor Inorganic and Physical Chemistry at the Armstrong College, University of Durham. In 1947 was appointed director of carbonisation research at Britain's National Coal Board where he served until his retirement in the 1960s.

== Early life and education ==
Riley was born in Keighley, Yorkshire, the oldest of three brothers. At the age of 10, he attended Holycroft Council School, Keighley, where he won a Borough Scholarship, which enabled him to go on to study at Keighley Boy's Grammar School, where he was head prefect from 1916 to 1917. He graduated from school with honours and was awarded a County Major Scholarship, after coming joint top for Yorkshire, along with a student from Keighley Girls' Grammar School.

Before taking up his scholarship, he joined the British Army and Served as a corporal with the 9th King's Own Yorkshire Light Infantry (K.O.Y.L.I., 1917–1919) in France during the Great War, seeing action in the trenches of the Somme in 1918.

After the war he entered the Royal College of Science in 1919, (part of Imperial College). In 1921 he received his B.Sc. degree with honours in Chemistry, and became an Associate of the Royal College of Science (ARCS). That year he was also the winner of the Frank Hatton prize for the most efficient student in advanced Chemistry (1920–21).

In 1921 Imperial College awarded him a Sir Otto Beit Scientific Research Fellowship for a thesis entitled "Studies in Complex Salts and Other Papers". The fellowship, worth £250 a year, ran from 1921 to 1923, and led to the degree of Doctor of Science being conferred upon him. He conducted postgraduate research with Nellie Ivy Fisher.

== Research and career ==
Riley remained at Imperial College as a demonstrator and later lecturer from 1923 to 1932, where he continued to pursue research in inorganic chemistry. He began to study the role of selenium oxides as oxidants of organic compounds, pioneering a new chemical process involving selenium, known today as Riley oxidation. Whilst these studies occupied Riley for a relatively short period, his 1932 publication had perhaps the deepest impact among his more than four decades of his publications. Although selenium oxides' role as an oxidant of organic compounds had first been surmised in the late 19th century. it was systematic studies of this process by Riley and his coworkers with purified SeO_{2} that allowed synthetic chemists to create more than 500 distinct substrates over the next decade, highlighting the unmet needs for Riley's work.

In 1932, Riley had a chair appointment as the Professor of Inorganic and Physical Chemistry, as well as the positions of Honorary Director and Secretary of the Northern Coke (later Carbon) Research Committee, where he served until 1947. During his directorship, he published 50 papers. Riley retired in 1964, though he continued to publish periodic reports for the Society of Chemical Industry until circa 1969. Riley died on 25 March 1986.

== See also ==
- Riley oxidation
