= Ethna Beulah Winston =

American educator

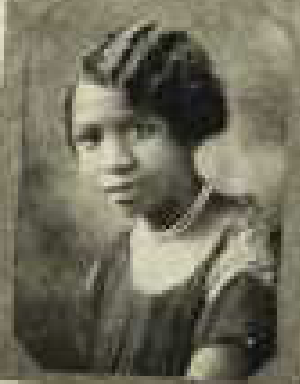
- Ethna Beulah Winston, from the 1928 yearbook of Howard University
- Born: July 13, 1903; Windsor, Connecticut
- Died: November 9, 1993 (age 90); Washington, D.C.
- Other names: E. Beulah Winston
- Occupation(s): Educator, social worker, school administrator

Ethna Beulah Winston (July 13, 1903 – November 9, 1993) was an American educator. She was dean of women and chair of the education department at Tougaloo College in Mississippi, and dean of women at Clark Atlanta University.

== Early life and education ==
Winston was born in Windsor, Connecticut, the daughter of Peter H. Winston and Eugenia S. Howard Winston. She graduated from John Fitch High School, and trained as a teacher at Miner Normal College in Washington, D.C., completing her studies there in 1925, before earning a bachelor's degree at Howard University in 1928. She earned a master of social work (MSW) degree from Hartford Seminary in 1939, with a thesis titled "The Need for Integrated Studies of Negro Culture and Achievement in Public Schools in Hartford, Connecticut". In 1944, she completed doctoral studies at Teachers College, Columbia University, with a dissertation titled " A Program of Guidance and Recreation in the Day Care of Children of Working Mothers in Hartford, Connecticut".

== Career ==
After college, Winston worked as a typist for a cousin in Miami, Florida, and taught typing classes at a night school there. She taught school, and did secretarial work at an insurance company, Howard University, the Federal Council of Churches, and Tuskegee University. In the early 1930s, she was a social worker in Hartford, Connecticut, arranging meals and housing for newly unemployed Black tobacco workers during the Great Depression.

In 1939, Winston became dean of women at Tougaloo College in Mississippi; later she was chair of the education department at Tougaloo. She also taught English at Howard University and Elizabeth City Teachers College, and was dean of women at Clark Atlanta University. In 1958, she was invited to teach at the American Collegiate Institute in Izmir, Turkey. In her seventies, she taught English at Calvin Coolidge High School in Washington, D.C.

Winston was a member of Alpha Kappa Alpha and the National Council of Negro Women (NCNW), and national chair of the NCNW's Youth Conservation Department. She was vice-president of the Connecticut Baptist Missionary Union, and a member of the YWCA, the National Association of Deans of Women, and the National Association of Deans and Advisors to Girls in Negro Schools. In 1947, she became a member of the American Educational Research Association (AERA). In 1951 she was featured in a Nigerian newspaper report on eleven prominent Black women in the United States, along with Alice Allison Dunnigan, Freda DeKnight, Flemmie P. Kittrell, Sadie Tanner Mossell Alexander and Ella P. Stewart.

== Publications ==
- "The Day Care Program for Children in Hartford, Connecticut" (1946)

== Personal life ==
After she retired from teaching, Winston lived with Norma Elizabeth Boyd, one of the founding members of Alpha Kappa Alpha; when Boyd died in 1985, Winston continued living in the home they shared. Winston died in 1993, at the age of 90, in Washington, D.C.
