= Frances Mary Hamer =

British chemist

- Born: 14 October 1894; Kentish Town, London, England
- Died: 29 April 1980 (aged 85); Hastings, England
- Education: Girton College, Cambridge; University of London
- Occupation: Chemist
- Known for: The Cyanine Dyes and Related Compounds (1964)

Frances Mary Hamer (1894–1980) was a British chemist who specialized in the sensitization compounds used for photographic processing for which she held many patents. She was very active in the Allied efforts to enhance aerial photography during World War I.

== Life ==
Frances was born on 14 October 1894 to Sir William Heaton Hamer (1862–1936) and Agnes Conan in Kentish Town, London. Her father studied medicine at Cambridge and in 1912 was named Medical Officer of Health of the London County Council.

=== Education ===
Hamer attended the same school as her mother and aunts on both sides of the family, the North London Collegiate School. Hamer was named after the founder of the school, and her godmother, educator Frances Mary Buss. Hamer graduated in 1916 and that same year, she read chemistry at Girton College, Cambridge. However, at that time, women were not allowed to earn college degrees at Cambridge. She went on to earn her doctorate in chemistry in 1924 from the University of London.

=== Wartime chemist ===
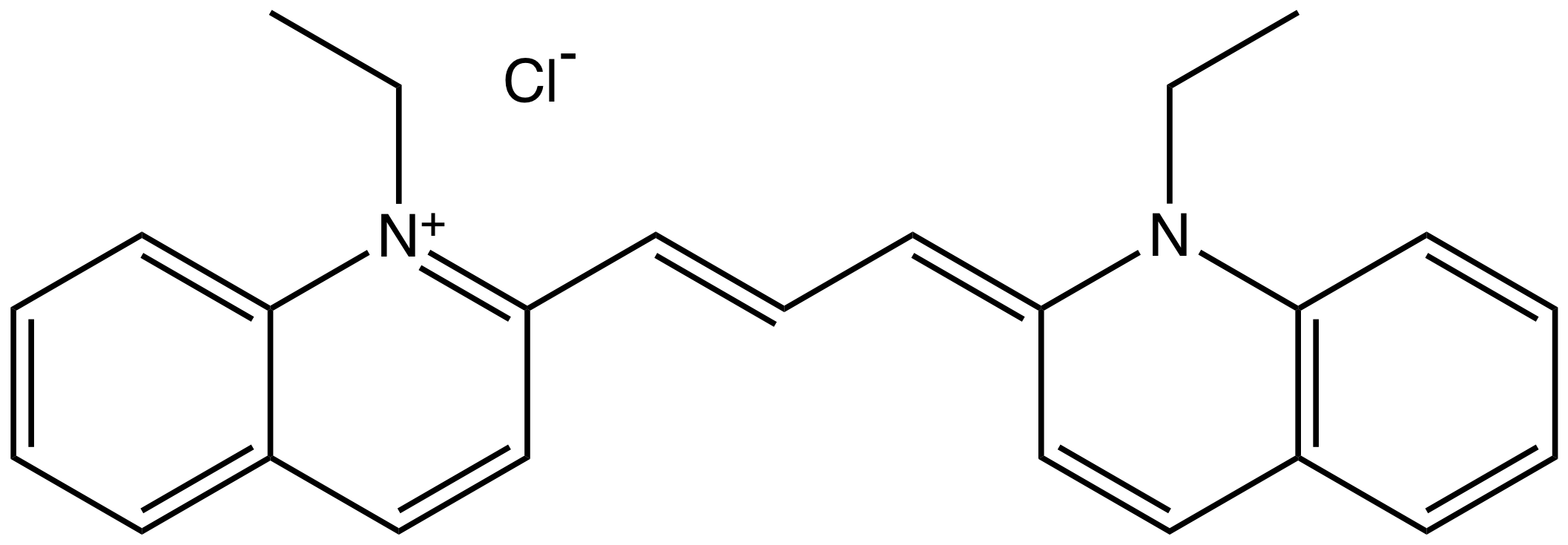
Chemical structure of pinacyanol chloride.

Even as an undergraduate at Girton during the first World War, Hamer joined the research group of Sir William Pope who was investigating a reliable synthetic photographic sensitizer. They needed a substitute for the chemical pinacyanol (invented by a German company in 1905 and used by them to their advantage during the war), which when incorporated into photographic plates improved their sensitivity toward the red end of the visible spectrum. By using pinacyanol, the photographs taken by German planes showed much more detail than those taken by Allied pilots of German battlefronts.

The group worked with William Hobson Mills to determine the structure of pinacyanol and identify a reliable way to synthesize it. As a result, "She was successful in both ventures, and nearly all the pinacyanol used in the new British panchromatic film came from the Cambridge laboratories" and vastly improved the images taken at dawn, greatly helping British efforts.

=== Private industry chemist ===
Hamer worked for six years at Ilford Photo Ltd. before she was hired by Kodak in Harrow, England. According to the hiring manager,

I wanted a first-class organic chemist, and heard that Dr. Frances Mary Hamer, well-known for her work on sensitizing dyes at Cambridge with Pope and Mills, and who had been at the Ilford Research Laboratories, had fallen out with her directors over the matter of ventilation in her laboratory. I wrote and told Kenneth Mees. He wrote back and said: "Take her out to tea and sound her out." So I did, and she came..."

Hamer was named Kodak's Head of the Organic Chemistry Research Department. During her time at Ilford and Kodak, she authored more than 70 research papers and filed many patents. In the process she discovered new classes of photographic sensitizers. While working at Ilford Research Laboratories she met chemist Nellie Ivy Fisher (who would later become the first woman to head a division at Kodak-Australia). When Hamer moved to Kodak in 1934, Fisher followed, and together they authored seven publications and several patents.

Hamer became active in several professional associations, Councils of the Chemical Society, the Royal Society of Chemistry, and she was the first woman elected to the Royal Photographic Society (RPS). She remained disappointed that she was never elected a Fellow of the Royal Society but, according to author Rayner-canham, "in addition to the handicap of being a woman, Hamer's applied research was outside the mainstream academic chemical circles, and thus, she would have had few champions among the Fellows of the time." In 1945, she returned to her academic research roots and was named an honorary lecturer at Imperial College while continuing to work as a research chemist and consultant at Kodak.

=== Post-retirement ===
Hamer retired fully in 1959 and immediately began writing the book called "the definitive monograph about cyanine dyes." The Cyanine Dyes and Related Compounds, published in 1964. A serious accident in 1964, and a second in 1971, reduced Hamer's mobility and she could only walk with the aid of a cane. Still, she remained an enthusiastic gardener. She died on 29 April 1980 in Hastings at 85.

== Selected awards ==
- Gamble Prize (1921)
- Yarrow Scientific Research Fellowship (1921)
- Henderson Award (1948)
- Royal Photographic Society Progress Medal (1963)
- Honorary Fellowship to the Royal Photographic Society (1963)
- Fellowship, British Chemical Society

== Selected publications ==
According to WorldCat.org, Hamer is listed as author for 79 works in 105 publications in 2 languages and 669 library holdings worldwide.

- Mills, William Hobson, and Frances Mary Hamer. "CCXLI.—The quaternary salts of quinaldinic acid." Journal of the Chemical Society, Transactions 121 (1922): 2008-2014.
- Hamer, Frances Mary. "CCCCXVIII.—Carbocyanine dyes with substituents attached to the three-carbon chain." Journal of the Chemical Society (Resumed) (1928): 3160-3163.
- Fisher, Nellie I., and Frances M. Hamer. "A comparison of the absorption spectra of some typical symmetrical cyanine dyes." Proceedings of the Royal Society of London. Series A-Mathematical and Physical Sciences 154.883 (1936): 703-723.
- Hamer, Frances M., and Russell J. Rathbone. "Thiazinocyanines. Part II. Cyanines containing the dihydro-1: 3-thiazine nucleus." Journal of the Chemical Society (Resumed) (1943): 243-249.
- Hamer, Frances M. "Some chain-substituted methincyanines and styryl dyes." Journal of the Chemical Society (Resumed) (1956): 1480-1498.
- Hamer, Frances M. The Cyanine Dyes and Related Compounds. New York: Interscience Publishers, 1964. Print.

== Selected patents ==
Some 32 patents are credited to Hammer.

- Improvements in or relating to the manufacture of dyes, GB GB351555A, Frances Mary Hamer
- Improvements in the manufacture of dyestuffs and intermediates therefor, US GB GB413300A, Frances Mary Hamer
- Improvements in and relating to the manufacture of cyanine dyes and their use …, US DE FR GB GB419361A, Frances Mary Hamer
- Improvements in the manufacture of intermediates for the production of dyes, in …, US BE FR GB GB629123A, Frances Mary Hamer
- Improvements in the manufacture of cyanine and related dyes, US GB GB455710A, Frances Mary Hamer
- Preparation of cyanines comprising a single ring nucleus, GB GB369947A, Frances Mary Hamer
- 2-amino-and 2-alkylthio-4-(2-furyl) thiazoles, CA CA479467A, Frances Mary Hamer
