= Joanna E. Wood =

Canadian novelist (1867-1927)

Joanna Ellen Wood
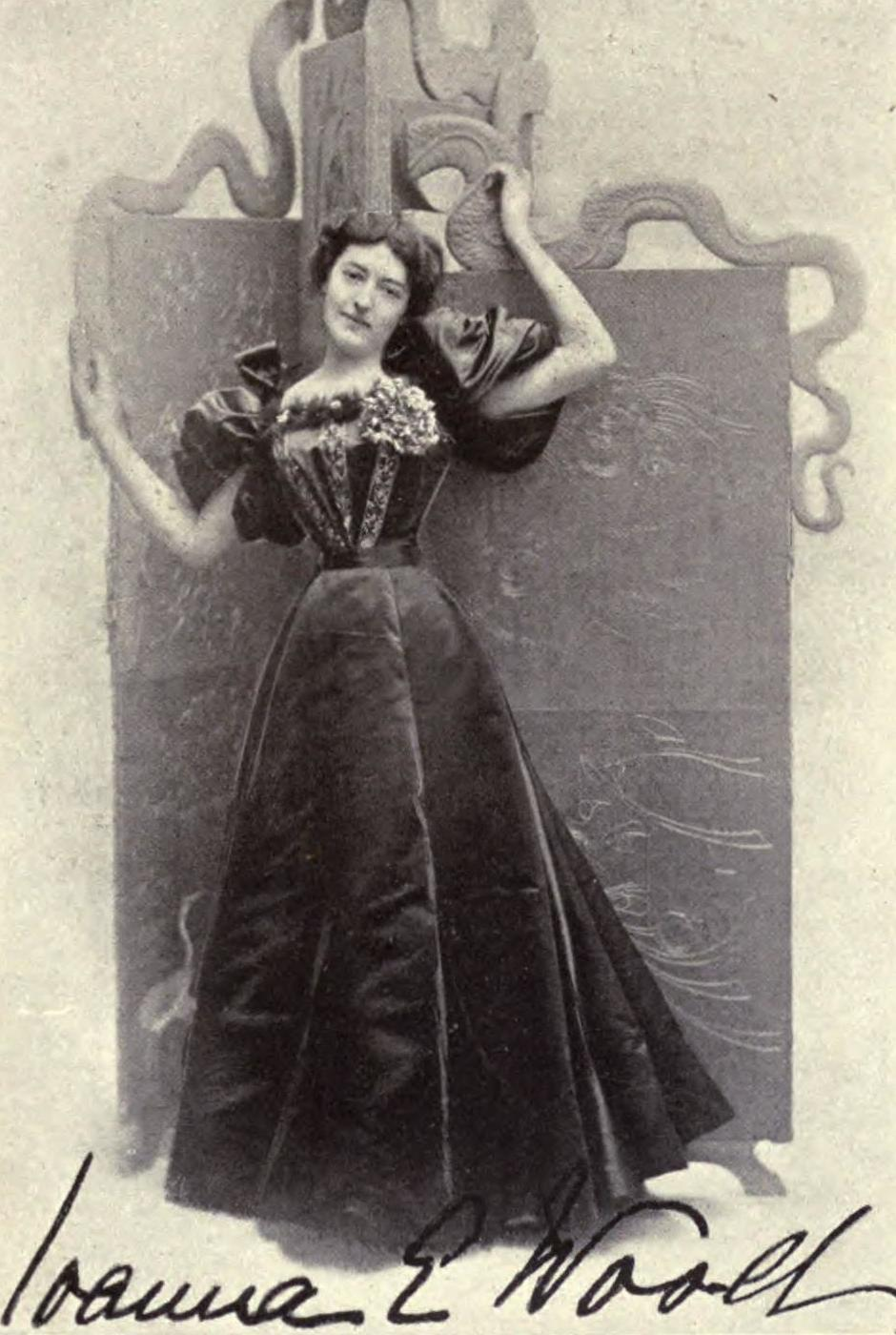
- Wood circa 1903
- Born: December 28, 1867; Lesmahagow, Scotland
- Died: May 1, 1927 (aged 59); Detroit, Michigan
- Burial place: Fairview Cemetery in Niagara Falls, Ontario
- Other name: Nelly Wood
- Occupation: Novelist

Joanna Ellen Wood (December 28, 1867 – May 1, 1927), sometimes known as Nelly Wood, was a Canadian novelist. By 1901, she was the highest-paid fiction writer in Canada.

== Biography ==
Joanna Ellen Wood was born on December 28, 1867, in Lesmahagow, Scotland, the youngest of 11 children. Her family came to Irving, New York, in 1869, moving to Ontario, Canada, soon thereafter. As of 1913, she lived in Queenston, Ontario, which, along with Niagara-on-the-Lake, Ontario, was her primary Canadian residence. Wood also lived in France and various American cities. In an 1896 profile for the Buffalo Courier-Express, Honora S. Howard noted that "[l]ack of nationality in her work and in other personal characteristics inclines us to place [her] among the cosmopolites".

Wood's novel Judith Moore, or, Fashioning a Pipe (1898) is the story of Andrew Cutler, a burgeoning artist in small-town Ontario, who comes to meet Judith Moore, an opera singer who has toured Europe and North America. Carrie MacMillan argues that Cutler represents an "ideal Canadian type" of artist who needn't go abroad to realize his talents. In other work, MacMillan describes Wood as a "sentimental novelist" influenced by Thomas Hardy. Although mainly a novelist, Wood also published a number of short stories and serials. In 1901 she was the highest-paid Canadian fiction writer.

In an 1899 article, Lawrence Johnstone Burpee described Wood as "the Miss Wilkins of rural Ontario life", likely referring to Mary Eleanor Wilkins Freeman. Thomas Guthrie Marquis wrote in English-Canadian Literature (1913) that Wood "shows an intimate acquaintance with early conditions in Canada, and treats her subjects with artistic fineness and praiseworthy seriousness".

Wood died of a stroke, unmarried, in Detroit, Michigan, on May 1, 1927. She was buried in Fairview Cemetery in Niagara Falls, Ontario.

== Works ==
- The Untempered Wind (1894)
- Judith Moore, or, Fashioning a Pipe (1898)
- A Daughter of Witches (1900)
- Farden Ha' (1901)
- A Martyr to Love (1903)
