= Preservation Action =

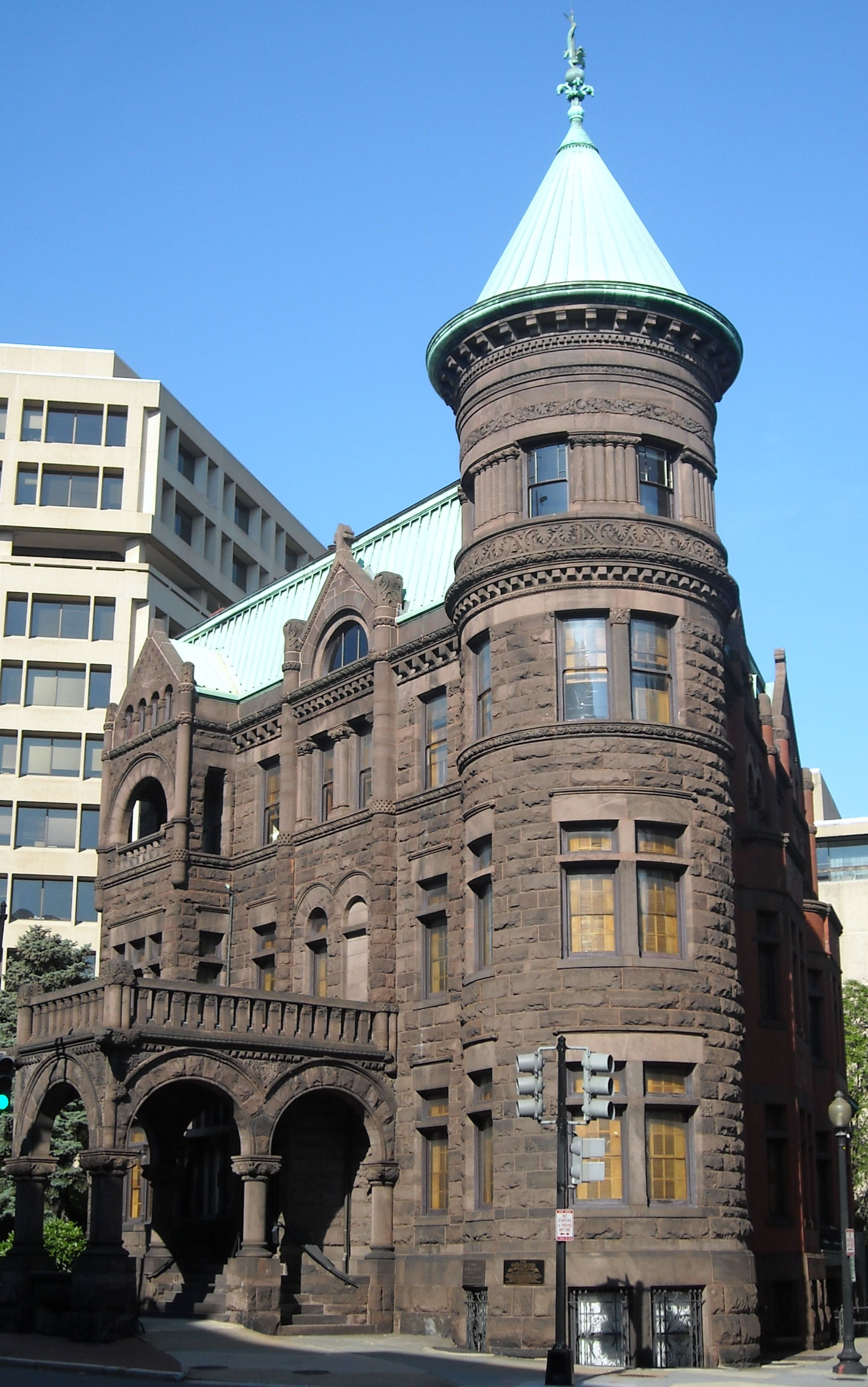
- Christian Heurich Mansion
- Formation: 1974
- Type: Non-profit organization
- Purpose: Grassroots lobby for history preservation
- Headquarters: Christian Heurich Mansion, 1307 New Hampshire Ave., NW, Washington, DC 20036
- Region served: USA
- President: Russ Carnahan
- Main organ: Board of Directors
- Website: preservationaction.org

Preservation Action is an American 501(c)4 non-profit historic preservation advocacy organization. Preservation Action was created in 1974 to serve as the national grassroots lobby for historic preservation. The organization seeks to make historic preservation a national priority by advocating to all branches of the federal government for sound preservation policy and programs through a grassroots constituency of hundreds of members from throughout the United States. Preservation Action provides information and training, and encourages direct contact with elected representatives, with National Historic Preservation Advocacy Week being the highlight of advocacy and outreach efforts each year.

Preservation Action's offices are in the Christian Heurich Mansion in Washington, D.C., though it has representatives across the country.

== History ==
Preservation Action came about after the National Historic Preservation Act of 1966. Early in the 1970s, preservation leaders realized that achieving their goals required substantial increases in federal support. This included especially the need for appropriations for federal-state preservation programs, changes in laws and regulations, and an understanding of the U.S. Congress and the federal government of the benefits of historic preservation. Preservation Action proved instrumental in the passage of various laws and amendments, including the Tax Reform Act of 1976. Following the success of these early advocacy efforts, the focus shifted slightly to helping local organizations advocate for preservation in their own communities and states as well as continuing to lobby Congress for increased funding for federal preservation projects and agencies.

The success of Preservation Action at the federal level, inspired the establishment of enhanced preservation lobbying efforts at the state level. Such was the case with the establishment of Connecticut Preservation Action in 1979, to overturn a newly enacted law that would have crippled the state's National Register program.

In the 1980s preservationists were increasingly interested in the 'business' of preservation'. Initiatives like the Main Street Program, established by the National Trust for Historic Preservation in 1980, helped to focus efforts to improve historic downtown areas and commercial districts throughout the United States. Into this milieu came Preservation Action, that along with the National Trust for Historic Preservation, served as an important advocate for historic preservation at the federal level.

With improved incentives for historic preservation in the form of tax credits and other programs, the focus of urban projects shifted dramatically from demolition to rehabilitation. Nellie Longsworth, founding member and President of Preservation Action for twenty-two years, explained: "All kinds of things have been tried to stop the deterioration of downtowns. The first program that ever really worked was the investment tax credit." With the unprecedented growth in historic preservation activities, Preservation Action cemented its role as a rallying point for the private historic preservation community at the national level, along with the National Trust for Historic Preservation. Sources credit this coming together of forces in support of historic preservation, and Longsworth especially. Arthur P. Ziegler Jr., wrote "Never before or since have we seen preservation activities carried out so diligently by so many with such excellent results."

In more recent decades, federal programs such as Save America's Treasures and Preserve America have brought resources to the front lines of where preservation work is being done in communities. These same programs, despite their effectiveness, were threatened by cutbacks in funding in the present fiscal environment. Preservation Action has always and continues to play an important role in advocating for these federal programs to support historic preservation at the state and local level.

In 2015, Preservation Action started to conduct monthly calls with statewide organizations to better connect states to the legislative efforts happening at the federal level, as well as, connecting Preservation Action the legislative efforts happening at the state and local level.

In 2016, prior to the November Congressional elections, Preservation Action conducted a Federal Candidate Historic Preservation Survey. Preservation Action conducted a nationwide historic preservation survey of all candidates running for the U.S House and U.S Senate. The survey gauged candidates on their support of a number of issues important to preservationists, like the Historic Preservation Fund and Federal Historic Rehabilitation Tax Credit program.

== Current activities ==
Preservation Action has several existing programs and activities to advance the cause of historic preservation today. A few of these follow.

=== Legislative Update ===
The Legislative Update is an email sent out regularly on a weekly basis to Preservation Action members. Updates on spending bills and legislation affecting preservation are included each week. Special announcements are made and upcoming events are highlighted.

=== National Historic Preservation Advocacy Week ===
This event, usually held in March of each year, provides an opportunity for representatives from participating states to come and lobby their members of Congress. The first day provides a general overview of major issues affecting preservation. The second day is filled with Capitol Hill visits.

== Leadership ==
Former Congressman Russ Carnahan is President of Preservation Action. He is responsible for the leadership of the organization, and furthering the member-driven legislative agenda in Congress through direct lobbying and/or through an active membership and national partners. He is supported by a staff in the preparation of educational materials and weekly legislative updates.

The Board of Directors plays an active role in the operation of Preservation Action. An executive Committee with a Chair, several Vice Chairs, Secretary, and Treasurer assists in managing the organization.
