= Nellie Pratt Russell =

Alpha Kappa Alpha founder (1890–1979)

- Born: May 4, 1890; Macon, Georgia, U.S.
- Died: December 13, 1979 (age 89); Lawrenceville, Virginia, U.S.
- Occupations: incorporator of Alpha Kappa Alpha sorority; English teacher at St. Paul's Normal and Industrial School for 50 years
- Spouse: Dr. J. Alvin Russell

Nellie Pratt Russell (May 4, 1890 - December 13, 1979) was an incorporator of Alpha Kappa Alpha sorority, the first sorority founded by African-American college women.

Earning undergraduate and graduate degrees at Howard University and Columbia University, Nellie Russell worked as an educator for more than 50 years, mostly teaching English at St. Paul's College, an historically black college in Lawrenceville, Virginia. There she inspired generations of students and teachers. Russell was featured in the 1927 volume of Who's Who in Colored America. St. Paul's College named a building after Nellie Russell and her husband Dr. J. Alvin Russell, in honor of their contributions, and endowed a scholarship in their name.

== Early life ==
Nellie Pratt was born in Macon, Georgia on May 4, 1890. In 1907, she entered Howard University's College of Arts and Sciences. It was the top historically black college in the nation, and she attended at a time when only .33% of African Americans and 5% of whites of eligible age attended any college.

== Howard University and Alpha Kappa Alpha ==
Nellie Pratt graduated in 1911 from Howard with a Bachelor of Arts degree in English. Pratt was initiated into Alpha Kappa Alpha during her sophomore year. During college, Pratt started a lifetime of service by volunteering to distribute clothes and food to the poor.

=== Incorporation of Alpha Kappa Alpha ===
Pratt, Nellie Quander, Julia Evangeline Brooks, Norma Boyd, Minnie B. Smith and Ethel Jones Mowbray worked together to incorporate Alpha Kappa Alpha on January 29, 1913, in order to provide for its future expansion to other colleges.

== Career and later life ==
After graduation, Russell taught history and English for two years at Topeka Normal and Industrial School in Topeka, Kansas.

To be closer to her mother after her father's death, Nellie Pratt moved to Lawrenceville, Virginia to teach at St. Paul Normal and Industrial School (now St. Paul's College). It was a historically black college. There, in 1913, Nellie Pratt married Dr. J. Alvin Russell. The elder son of the school's founder, Russell served as principal of St. Paul Normal and Industrial School starting in 1926, and as president for several years starting in 1936. During their marriage, Nellie Russell had four sons and one daughter.

Nellie Russell also did graduate work during the summers, earning a Master of Arts degree from Columbia University in New York. She devoted great energy to her career as an educator, teaching English at St. Paul's College for nearly 50 years. She influenced generations of students, and helped create teachers as excellent as she was.

Russell served as a faculty advisor to the Alpha Upsilon chapter of ΑΚΑ at St. Paul's College. In 1949, Nellie Russell expanded Alpha Kappa Alpha by helping found the Gamma Lambda Omega graduate chapter. Russell created a chapter educational loan to provide for undergraduate students. Through the years, she served as the chapter's president, secretary, historian, and correspondence secretary.

Nellie Russell's daughter and three daughters-in-law all became members of Alpha Kappa Alpha in their turn. Her son James Russell served for 10 years with distinction as President of St. Paul's College.

Nellie Pratt Russell died on December 13, 1979.

== Honors ==
- The 1927 Who's Who in Colored America included the biography of Nellie Pratt Russell in its collection of people who contributed to the science, culture and overall development of U.S. society.
- St. Paul's College named a building after Dr. J. Alvin and Nellie Russell, in honor of their long, joint contributions to the college. The college also established a scholarship in their name.
- Russell was named "Mother of the Year" and outstanding chapter member by a local chapter of the fraternity Omega Psi Phi.
- Russell was honored with a state historical marker in 2017; it was erected by the Virginia Department of Historic Resources near the Brunswick County Museum and Historical Society in Lawrenceville.
