= Mansfield D. Sprague =

American politician (1910–2006)

Member of the Connecticut House of Representatives from New Canaan
- In office 1947–1955
- Preceded by: Nellie Stewart; Ira E. Hicks
- Succeeded by: Clifford W. Hall; Mary Van Zile Cunningham

Speaker of the Connecticut House of Representatives
- In office 1951
- Preceded by: John R. Thim
- Succeeded by: Arthur E. B. Tanner

General Counsel of the Department of Defense
- In office October 6, 1955 – February 27, 1957
- President: Dwight D. Eisenhower
- Preceded by: Wilber M. Brucker
- Succeeded by: Robert Dechert

Assistant Secretary of Defense for International Security Affairs
- In office February 28, 1957 – October 3, 1958
- President: Dwight D. Eisenhower
- Preceded by: Gordon Gray
- Succeeded by: John N. Irwin II

Personal details
- Born: December 1, 1910 Bridgeport, Connecticut, U.S.
- Died: March 25, 2006 (aged 95)
- Party: Republican
- Education: Dartmouth College; Yale University

Mansfield D. Sprague (December 1, 1910 – March 25, 2006) was an American politician. A Republican, he represented the town of New Canaan in the Connecticut House of Representatives from 1947 to 1955.

== Life and career ==
Sprague was born in Bridgeport, Connecticut. He attended Dartmouth College and Yale University.

Sprague served in the Connecticut House of Representatives from 1947 to 1954.

Sprague died on March 25, 2006, at the age of 95.
