= Women's Social Service Association =

Women's Social Service Association (WSSA), also known as Women's Social Service Club, Women's Social Services Organisation or Women's Social Welfare Society, was a women's organization in Jamaica, founded in 1918. It was named Women's Social Service Association (WSSA) in 1925. It is known for the role it played during the campaign for women's suffrage on Jamaica.

The WSSA was co-founded by Nellie Latrielle and Judith DeCordova.

When Britain introduced women's suffrage in 1918, women's activists on Jamaica launched a campaign to extend this reform to Jamaica, which was a British colony at the time. White upper class wives of the British officials on Jamaica advocated for the introduction of women's suffrage with reference to Jamaican women's contribution to the war effort during the world war; they had the support of the establishment and they advocated for women to be given the same voting rights as men, which in the case of Jamaica meant a very restricted and limited suffrage. The WSSA arranged name petitions, public speeches and two big mass meetings and the reform was successfully introduced on 14 May 1919; it was the first state in the West Indies to introduce the reform, but no woman was elected to a political office until Mary Morris Knibb in 1939.

Universal women's suffrage was promoted by Jamaica Women's League and the Women's Liberal Club, and was ultimately included in the 1944 reform bill suggested by the Report of West India Royal Commission (Moyne Report).
