= Nellie Gray =

Nellie Gray may refer to:

- Nellie Gray (activist) (1924–2012), American anti-abortion activist and founder of U.S. March for Life
- Nellie Gray Robertson (1894–1955), American lawyer and jurist
- "Nelly Gray" (song), 19th century anti-slavery ballad written and composed by Benjamin Hanby in 1856

== See also ==
- Neely Gray (1810–1867), American businessman and politician
