= Nellie E. Pooler Chapman =

American dentist

Nellie Elizabeth Pooler Chapman (1847–1906) became in 1879 the first registered female dentist in the American western territories.

She was born Nellie Elizabeth Pooler on May 8, 1847, in Norridgewock, Maine to John Ruxton Pooler and Matilda J. O'Hara. who joined the California Gold Rush. Nellie mined alongside her parents in California.

At the age of 14, she married the dentist Allen Chapman (1826–1897), with whom she had two sons in 1862 and 1864 when she was 14 and 17 of age. She learned by assisting her husband with his dental practice and quickly took to dentistry.

When she was 21, her husband left to look for silver in the Comstock silver rush in Nevada. In 1879 she became the first registered female dentist in the American western territories; that was the first year dentists in those territories had to be registered, and she was registered as number 79.

Her dental practice continued to grow. Chapman soon equipped her practice with state of the art equipment and her clients were said to be treated “like royalty".

Chapman died of cancer on April 7, 1906, in Nevada City, California.

Both of her sons followed in her footsteps and became dentists as well.

Chapman has been said to have paved the way for the women dentists in the Western United States that would follow. An exhibit detailing the events of her life can be seen at the Women's Museum of California in San Diego, California.
