= Nellie Ivy Fisher =

Industrial chemist

- Born: 15 October 1907; London, England
- Died: 10 August 1995 (aged 87); Melbourne, Australia
- Other name: Jackie Fisher
- Education: Imperial College of Science and Technology; University of London
- Occupation: Chemist

Nellie Ivy Fisher (1907–1995) was a British-Australian industrial chemist and researcher who specialized in photographic chemistry and became known for her work in Australia as the first woman to lead a division of Kodak.

== Life ==
Nellie Ivy Fisher was born on 15 October 1907 in London, one of six children born to master jeweller Francis Frederick Fisher and his wife, Mary Jane Davis.

Educated at Paddington and Maida Vale High School, Nellie studied chemistry at the Imperial College of Science and Technology, University of London, earning her BSc in 1929. While there, she served as president of the Imperial College Women's Association (1928–1929). She undertook a further year of postgraduate research with Harry Lister Riley, for which she received the Diploma of Imperial College."

In 1930, Fisher took a position with a division of Ilford Research Laboratories where she was a research assistant to Dr. Frances Mary Hamer, noted chemist specializing in sensitizing dyes used for photographic processing. When Hamer took a new position at Kodak Ltd in 1934, Fisher also moved to that company in Harrow, England. There Fisher and Hamer researched the preparation and properties of cyanine dyes, which provide spectral sensitivity to photographs and are critical to colour photography. The partnership was very productive and their work was the subject of Fisher's doctoral thesis at the University of London (PhD, 1938) entitled New Methods of Preparation and Some New Dyes of the Cyanine Series.

=== Australia ===
In late 1939, Fisher accepted the invitation of Kenneth Mees (then head of research with Eastman Kodak at Rochester, New York), to move to Australia where she later became the founder and director of Kodak Emulsion Labs. Following a "perilous wartime voyage" from England, she finally started work at the Melbourne facility in February 1940.

At Kodak Australasia, she provided expertise in preparing emergency quantities of spectral sensitisers, supplies of which were expected to be restricted during World War II. Specifically, she started working "on many manufacturing problems using her knowledge of dyes as filters".

At the Abbotsford plant of Kodak (Australasia) Pty Ltd, she was the first woman to be named head of a division. She worked with the head of research, Neil ‘Blue’ Lewis, synthesising dyes and preparing ‘gelatine colour correction Wratten-type filters and safelight screens’. According to Rae, her contributions were significant.

Fisher gave a lecture illustrated with lantern slides to a meeting of the (Royal) Australian Chemical Institute in August 1944, on the subject Colour in Relation to the Structure of Organic Compounds with Special Reference to the Cyanine Dyes. A newspaper notice of the meeting mentioned that the dyes were useful as sensitisers in aerial photography, a rare, if oblique, reference to wartime scientific work by Kodak. In 1953, [Neil] Lewis addressed the institute on the science of colour photography, emphasising the contributions of Kodak and the use of modern methods of chemical analysis. Nellie Fisher had led the introduction of these techniques to Kodak's Australian operations.

In 1948, Kodak established a separate emulsion (sensitising) laboratory under Fisher's leadership where she worked until her retirement. While there she "trained dozens of chemists, many of whom went on to senior roles in the company". In 1961, when the Kodak factory was moved to a larger site at Coburg outside of Melbourne, she took charge of building the new labs there.

She retired from Kodak in 1962, but kept in contact with researchers there for many years.

== Personal life ==
Known as Jackie Fisher among her friends, she and her life partner, New Zealand-born medical practitioner, William Wishart, were both enthusiastic bushwalkers and enjoyed their passion even while on holiday overseas. After Wishart's death in 1977, Fisher joined the Melbourne Walking Club and remained an active member until her failing health kept her close to home in the early 1990s.

She died in Box Hill, Melbourne on 10 August 1995 and was cremated.

== Selected publications ==
After Fisher followed Hamer to Kodak in 1934, the two researchers "authored seven publications together and several patents".

- Fisher, Nellie I., and Frances M. Hamer. "A comparison of the absorption spectra of some typical symmetrical cyanine dyes." Proceedings of the Royal Society of London. Series A-Mathematical and Physical Sciences 154.883 (1936): 703-723.
- Fisher, Nellie Ivy, and Frances Mary Hamer. "CCCXXXI.—A general method for the preparation of thiocyanine dyes. Some simple thiocarbocyanines." Journal of the Chemical Society (Resumed) (1930): 2502-2510.
- Riley, Harry Lister, and Nellie Ivy Fisher. "CCLXII.—The electrolytic dissociation of some metal malonates." Journal of the Chemical Society (Resumed) (1929): 2006-2010.

== Selected patents ==
Fisher filed for several patents while she was working for Kodak.

- Nellie Ivy Fisher. Improvements in the manufacture of dyestuffs and intermediates therefor. US GB GB413300A; Priority 1933-01-09 • Filed 1933-01-09 • Published 1934-07-09
- Nellie Ivy Fisher. Improvements in the manufacture of cyanine and related dyes. US GB GB455710A; Priority 1935-03-21 • Filed 1935-03-21 • Published 1936-10-21
- Frances Mary Hamer and Nellie Ivy Fisher - Cyanine dyes and a process for the preparation, 2,108,484 1, assignment to Eastman Kodak Company, Jersey City.
