= Nellie Meadows =

American painter

- Born: April 4, 1915; Clay City, Kentucky
- Died: November 6, 2006 (aged 91); Winchester, Kentucky
- Occupation: Artist

Nellie Meadows (April 4, 1915 – November 6, 2006) was an artist from Clay City, Kentucky whose painting "Kentucky the Great State" became the state's official piece during the U.S. bicentennial.

Meadows was born in 1915, and spent most of her life in Clay City, Kentucky. In the 1960s, she began painting birds and wildflowers that were indigenous to her area. She was part of the Kentucky Heritage Artists program, and traveled throughout the state presenting programs on painting, at numerous schools, libraries and other locations. She distributed her prints, and various note cards at a number of state parks and other venues. She was presented with a plaque in 1970 for her contributions to Kentucky's Public Libraries.

In the 1980s, she was commissioned by the Kidney Foundation of Central Kentucky, to paint a series of Kentucky winter and holiday scenes to be used as Christmas cards and prints, which earned tens of thousands of dollars for the foundation. Nellie also marketed prints that benefited the Arthritis Foundation, various women's clubs, and other organizations, Her paintings of local, Powell County, Kentucky, attractions; such as Natural Bridge, and the Red River Gorge, paid tribute to the Powell County area she was so proud of.

Her joy of painting was immense, and she loved to share her artwork with people. Her reputation as a generous, kind, and fun loving person was known in her hometown, home state, and in many other states around. In 2006, Nellie died at the age of 91. She was in the process of painting a new original work.

Al Cornett, a Powell County artist, described her as "an excellent wildflower artist and landscape painter".

== Publications ==
A book containing some of her wild flower paintings was published in 1969, with descriptive sketches by Nevyle Shackelford.

== Art Work ==
JACK IN THE PULPIT Let There Be Light 1981 Fruit Series Red Birds Holly Christmas Winter Horse Farm Scene Black Chapped Chickadee 1973 Wild Columbine American Goldfinch Cardinals Wooded Cabin Kentucky Governors Mansion ROCK BRIDGE 1974 Wildflower Prints Kentucky the Great State
