= Nellie Latrielle =

Jamaican political activist and feminist

Nellie Latrielle was a Jamaican political activist and feminist. She was a pioneer within the struggle for women's suffrage in Jamaica.

She was born in England and settled in Jamaica.

She was a leading figure in the Child Welfare Association, as well as in the struggle against prostitution and the control of venereal illness on Jamaica.

In 1918 she became the co-founder and first president of the Women's Social Service Association (WSSA). She and Judith DeCordova were leading figures in the campaign conducted by the WSSA to introduce women's suffrage, which had been introduced in Britain in 1918, also on Jamaica, a campaign which succeeded in 1919.
