= Nelly Shulman =

Russian rabbi

Nelly Shulman is the first female rabbi and author from Russia and was the first female rabbi in Belarus, having served as the chief reform rabbi of Minsk, Belarus. This makes her the first Russian-born woman to be a rabbi in the former Soviet Union. She was born in St. Petersburg, Russia, and received her rabbinical ordination at the Leo Baeck College in London in 1999. She was a rabbi in Belarus for five years, the first female rabbi to serve there. She later returned to Russia and worked as a rabbi in Moscow. She also became a founding member and rabbi for the World Union for Progressive Judaism in Russia. In 2006 she officiated at what is believed to be Russia's first Jewish same-sex commitment ceremony, which led to Russia's largest Jewish group, Federation of Jewish Communities of Russia, asking the Jewish Russian community to boycott Reform Jews.
