= Norma Elizabeth Boyd =

American politically active educator, children's rights proponent and pacifist

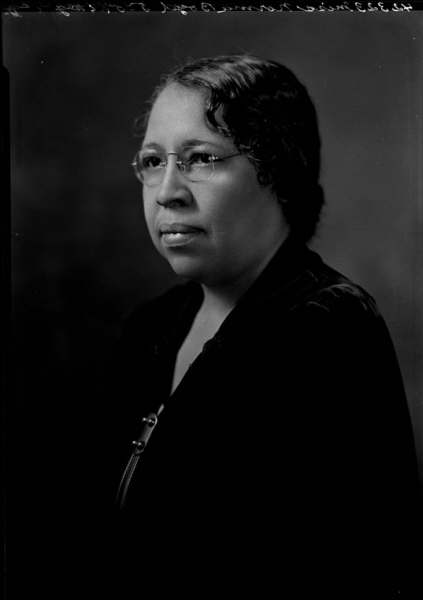
- Norma Elizabeth Boyd
- Born: August 9, 1888; Washington, D.C., U.S.
- Died: March 14, 1985 (age 96); New York City, New York, U.S.
- Occupations: founder of Alpha Kappa Alpha sorority; educator; civic activist

Norma Elizabeth Boyd (August 9, 1888 – March 14, 1985) was one of sixteen founders of Alpha Kappa Alpha, the first sorority founded by African-American women students, at Howard University. She was also one of the incorporators of the organization in 1913.

Boyd was an educator in Washington, D.C., public schools for more than thirty years, and expanded her students' worlds by taking them to Congressional hearings. She was one of the most politically active of the founders of Alpha Kappa Alpha, with interests both domestic and international.

In 1938 Boyd established the Non-Partisan Council, the first group representing minorities to lobby the United States Congress. For her efforts in creating and guiding the Non-Partisan Council, in 1948 Boyd was named "Woman of the Year in the Field of Legislation" by the National Council of Negro Women.

Boyd was active in a wide variety of organizations, including many with an international focus. Named a United Nations observer, Boyd represented the United States on several committees, as well as at a conference in Brazil.

== Early life ==
Boyd was educated in public schools in Washington, D.C. In September 1906, Boyd was admitted to Howard University's College of Arts and Sciences, where she majored in math. Howard University was the top historically black college in the nation. It was a time when only 1/3 of 1% of African Americans and 5% of whites of eligible age attended any college. Boyd graduated with a Bachelor of Arts degree in 1910.

== Career and later life ==
A lifelong learner, over the years Boyd took graduate courses in education and public relations at Columbia University, New York University, University of California at Berkeley, Vermont's Middlebury College Language School, National Autonomous University of Mexico, American University and George Washington University.

For more than thirty years, Boyd was an educator in public schools in Washington, D.C. Boyd would bring student council officers to congressional hearings, to educate them about the political process. She retired from teaching in 1948.

== Alpha Kappa Alpha ==
=== Incorporation of the sorority ===
At Howard University, Norma Elizabeth Boyd was one of seven sophomore initiates of Alpha Kappa Alpha sorority in February 1908. She served as Alpha chapter's president at two different times. After some sisters reorganized to run a sorority with a different name and symbols, Boyd, Nellie Quander, Julia Evangeline Brooks, Minnie B. Smith, Nellie Pratt Russell, and Ethel Jones Mowbray incorporated Alpha Kappa Alpha on January 29, 1913.

=== Involvement in the sorority ===
In 1913, Boyd was the corresponding secretary on the first Directorate of Alpha Kappa Alpha. She also was a regional director of the North Atlantic Region. Boyd chartered the Xi Omega chapter in Washington, D.C., where she served as president. In 1934, she raised funds for the first year of Alpha Kappa Alpha's Mississippi Health Project.

During World War II, Boyd chaired two symposia at Howard University: "Labor and Women in the War Effort," a three-day event, and "Defense Planning for the Future," a five-day conference.

=== Non-Partisan Council ===
We can ask for and support such measures as will assure for our people decent living conditions, permanent jobs, and a voice in determining the conditions under which they live and work. We can effect these objectives only by making our power felt in the halls and floors of Congress, and activity toward this end begins with participation in the primaries of our land.

— Norma Elizabeth Boyd.

In 1938, Boyd established the "Non-Partisan Lobby for Economic and Democratic Rights" (NPC), which lobbied Congress on issues of public service, education, voting rights, and employment related to African Americans. Later, the organization worked on civil, social, and political issues. The NPC reviewed all congressional bills, providing comments to Congress when necessary. In addition, the Non-Partisan Council helped to expand the Public Works Program and establish a minimum wage for laundry workers, and supported continuation of the American Youth Act.

During World War II, the council lobbied for civil rights legislation. The Non-Partisan Council also lobbied agencies such as the Department of State, the United Nations, and national educational, scientific, and cultural organizations, to draw attention to the need for integration. Lasting ten years, the organization was dissolved on July 15, 1948, by Supreme Basileus Edna Over Gray-Campbell.

The Non-Partisan Council worked with the NAACP, The Urban League, The United Office and Professional Workers of America, The National Association of Graduate Nurses, the American Federation of Churches, the Colored Women's Club, the Brotherhood of Sleeping Car Porters and Auxiliary, and the New York Voter's League. Established in 1946, the American Council of Human Rights superseded the Non-Partisan Council.

For her efforts in creating and guiding the Non-Partisan Council, in 1948 Boyd was named "Woman of the Year in the Field of Legislation" by the National Council of Negro Women.

== United Nations Involvement ==
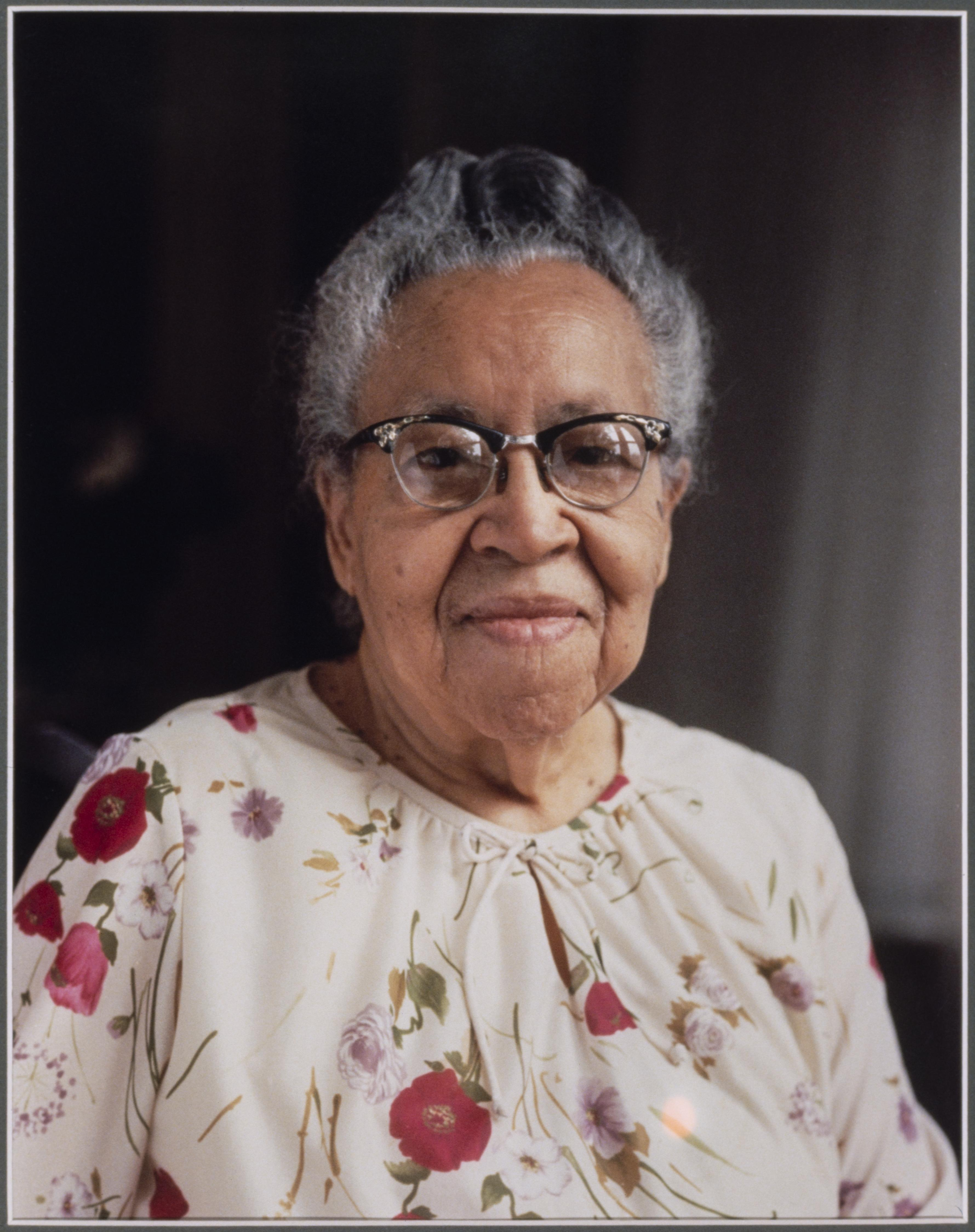
Norma Boyd c. 1982

Norma Boyd was named as a United Nations observer in 1949. She took part in several committees, such as the Advisory Committee to the American Delegate to the Inter-American Council of Women, the Pan-American Liaison Committee, and the East-West Association.

In 1949 Boyd traveled to South America as an observer at the Inter-American Commission of Women in Buenos Aires, Argentina. At the conference, she was a delegate representing the United Nations' non-government organizations, the International House Association, the People's Mandate Committee, and the Women's International League for Peace and Freedom. While in Brazil, Boyd also founded a chapter of International House.

As an observer, Boyd was interested in children's rights and supported Principle 10 of the Declaration of Human Rights. To help educate her students, one year Boyd financed twenty-five of them for a trip to the United Nations' General Assembly in New York City.

== Later life ==
In 1959, Boyd established the Women's International Religious Fellowship. The organization, which consisted of women from diverse backgrounds and cultures, helped to draw attention to children's safety and rights.

Boyd traveled widely in her life, to cities in United States, Canada, Mexico, South America, and the British West Indies. She wrote an autobiography, A Love that Equals My Labor. Fellow retired educator and AKA Ethna Beulah Winston lived with Boyd in Boyd's last years.

Norma Elizabeth Boyd, the last surviving founder of Alpha Kappa Alpha (AKA), died in Washington, D.C., on March 14, 1985.

== Membership in other organizations ==
Boyd was active in a wide variety of organizations:

1. Professional: National Council of Mathematics Teachers, American Federation of Teachers, and American Teacher's Association;
2. International: International Committee of the Temple of Understanding, Women's International Religious Fellowship, Pan-American Liaison Committee, and Women's International League for Peace and Freedom; and
3. Political: Non-Partisan Council, East-West Association, and People's Mandate Committee.

Boyd was also president of the International House Association in Washington, D.C. From 1958 to 1959 she chaired the World Fellowship Inter-Faith Committee at All Souls Church, Unitarian, of Washington, D.C.

== See also ==
- List of peace activists
