= Nelly Mugo =

Kenyan scientist

- Born: Nelly Rwamba Mugo
- Education: University of Nairobi; University of Washington
- Scientific career
- Fields: Medicine, HIV
- Workplaces: Kenya Medical Research Institute; University of Washington

Nelly Rwamba Mugo is a Kenyan obstetrician, gynaecologist and scientist involved in HIV and cervical cancer prevention research. She is a Research Associate Professor, Global Health in the University of Washington and the Center for Clinical Research, Kenya Medical Research Institute. She is also a member of the African Academy of Sciences. In 2021, Mugo became the inaugural recipient of the Gita Ramjee Prize.

== Early life and education ==
Mugo was one of eight children. She began her medical training at the University of Nairobi in 1981, where she completed degrees in Bachelor of Medicine, Bachelor of Surgery and Master of Medicine. In 2000, she received a degree in Master of Public Health from the University of Washington.

== Career ==
Mugo was trained as a gynaecologist and epidemiologist. She initially began her career at rural hospitals, and, later, the Pumwani Maternity Hospital. She was a clinician and the head of department for research and programs at the Kenyatta National Hospital, and has also provided training and mentorship for medical students. Mugo was an investigator for the Partners PrEP Study, which aimed to use medication to prevent HIV infection. Mugo has contributed to various World Health Organisation initiatives and fora, and was part of a committee that rewrote PrEP guidelines for Kenya's National AIDS and STI Control Programme.

In addition to her work as a researcher, Mugo is also a reproductive health clinical practitioner. She currently leads a clinical trial site in Thika, Kenya, and is also a member of the International Papillomavirus Society's Education Committee.

In 2021, Mugo became the inaugural recipient of the Gita Ramjee Prize for leading female scientists in the field of HIV prevention.

== Research ==
Mugo is a reproductive health specialist known for her research on STIs, notably in HIV and cervical cancer prevention. She has conducted HPV studies among sex workers, and has been involved in HPV vaccines trials.

Mugo was involved in pre-exposure prophylaxis studies as part of the Partner PrEP study, which aimed to improve HIV prevention among serodiscordant couples. She has subsequently become involved in programs to further implement and assess PrEP implementations, as well clinical trials for HIV self-testing methods. Mugo was also a member of the management committee for the Evidence for Contraceptive Options and HIV Outcomes (ECHO) trial, which evaluated the risk of acquiring the HIV virus while using contraceptives.

== Awards and recognition ==
- Elected Fellow of the African Academy of Sciences (2019).
- Recipient of the Gita Ramjee Prize for HIV prevention research, awarded by the International AIDS Society and The Aurum Institute (2021).

== Publications ==
Mugo has authored and co-authored more than 100 peer-reviewed journal articles on reproductive health and infectious diseases. Her research has informed policy on PrEP implementation in Kenya and internationally.
