= Nellie Stewart (politician) =

American politician (1882–1946)

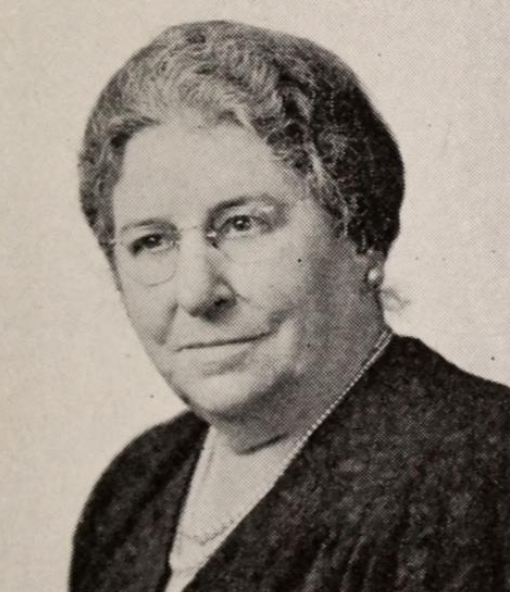
- Stewart c. 1946

Member of the Connecticut House of Representatives from New Canaan
- In office 1931 – October 13, 1946
- Preceded by: Walter C. Wood
- Succeeded by: Mansfield D. Sprague; Ira E. Hicks

Personal details
- Born: June 12, 1882 Tarrytown, New York, U.S.
- Died: October 13, 1946 (aged 64)
- Party: Republican
- Spouse: Walter C. Stewart
- Children: 2

Nellie D. Stewart (June 12, 1882 – October 13, 1946) was an American politician who served in the Connecticut House of Representatives from 1931 to her death in 1946, representing the town of New Canaan as a Republican.

== Personal life ==
Stewart was born in Tarrytown, New York, on June 12, 1882, to William J. and Marguerite J. Deverill. She graduated from Washington Irving High School and later lived in New Canaan, Connecticut. She was married to Walter C. Stewart and had two children.

== Political career ==
Stewart was first elected to the Connecticut House of Representatives in 1930 and served from 1931 to her death on October 13, 1946. She represented the town of New Canaan as a Republican. Stewart was succeeded in 1947 by fellow Republicans Mansfield D. Sprague and Ira E. Hicks.

== Death ==
Stewart died on October 13, 1946, following a long illness. She had reportedly suffered a stroke in July 1946 while on vacation in Ludlow, Vermont.
