= Nellie Craig Walker =

American school teacher, business owner

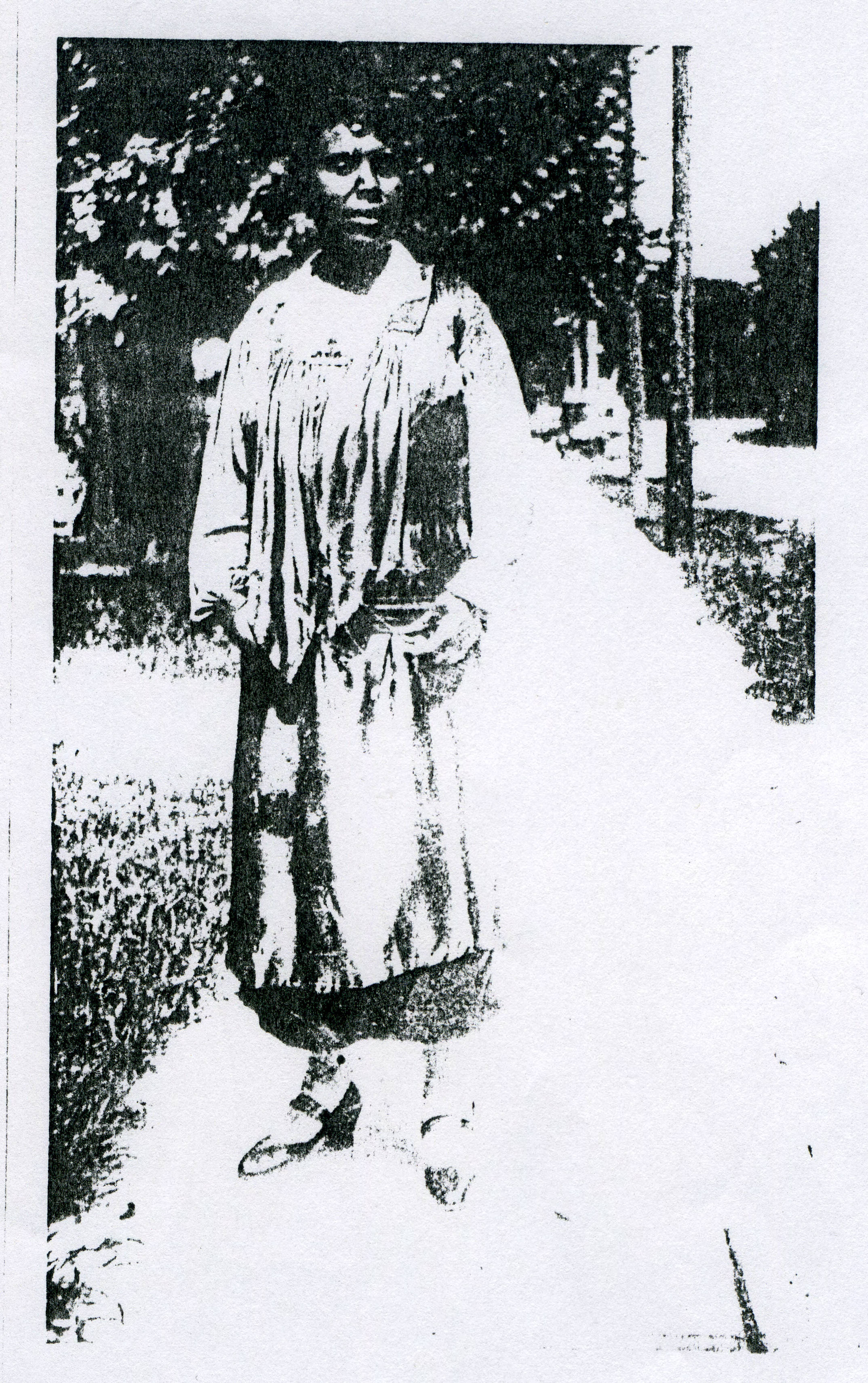
- Nelle Craig in 1905
- Born: Nellie Craig; 1881; Oxford, Ohio
- Died: 1969 (aged 87–88)
- Monuments: Nellie Craig Walker Hall, Miami University
- Education: Miami University
- Occupations: school teacher, business owner
- Employer: Oxford Public Schools
- Known for: first Black graduate of Miami University
- Spouse: James Walker

Nellie Craig Walker (1881–1969) was a school teacher and business owner, and was the first African-American student to graduate from Miami University.

Walker was born Nellie Craig in Oxford, Ohio in 1881, the daughter of Jessie Craig and Susan Ross Craig, and the youngest of four children. She attended the Ohio State Normal School (which later became part of Miami University), and graduated in 1905, one of a class of twenty women enrolled in the teacher's program. She was a student-teacher in the racially mixed classroom in the Oxford Public School system. She was the first Black student to graduate from Miami University, and taught in Indiana after graduating.

Nellie Craig was married to James Walker in 1911, and the two moved to Cleveland. They had four children. James Walker ran a tire company in Cleveland; when he died after 16 years of marriage, Nellie took over management of the business. She died in 1969.

Miami University renamed the former Campus Avenue Building, as Nellie Craig Walker Hall in her honor in 2020.
