= Nelly Vargas =

Mexican politician

- Born: 13 August 1959 (age 66); Centro, Tabasco, Mexico
- Occupation: Deputy
- Political party: MC

Nelly del Carmen Vargas Pérez (born 13 August 1959) is a Mexican politician affiliated with the Convergence. As of 2013 she served as Deputy of the LXII Legislature of the Mexican Congress representing Tabasco.
