= Nelly Winters =

Canadian artist

- Born: 1938 (age 87–88); Okak Bay, Newfoundland, Canada
- Citizenship: Makkovik, Nunatsiavut, Inuit Nunangat, Canadian
- Occupations: Garment/textile artist, entrepreneur, translator
- Known for: Garments, embroidery, textiles, jewelry
- Style: Inuit Art, Inukuluks
- Honours: Honorary Doctorate Degree of Doctor of Laws from Memorial University, Elder

Nelly (Nellie) May Winters (born 1938) is a Canadian Inuit garment and textile artist from Nunatsiavut. A self-taught artist, she is renowned for her embroidery, garments, and use of inukuluks (small human-like figures in Inuit art) in her works, which reflect Inuit culture and traditions. She is believed to be one of the most influential Nunatsiavut artists and has contributed to various exhibitions and publications. Recognized for her cultural contributions, Winters received an honorary Doctor of Laws degree from Memorial University in 2021.

== Personal life ==
=== Early life ===
Winters was born in 1938 in Okay Bay, Newfoundland, Canada. Her father was a postman and her mother was a midwife who introduced her to sewing. Her parents are originally from Makkovik, Newfoundland, Canada.

At age 11, Winters was sent to a residential school where she learned knitting and creation of inukuluks. Ordered by the Government of Newfoundland, Nunatsiavut children like Winters, were forced to attend residential boarding schools as a part of government policies aimed at assimilation. These schools were run by Moravian Missionaries.

In 1956, as part of a provincial government effort to centralize Nunatsiavut communities, Winters and family re-located to Makkovik, Newfoundland, Canada, where she currently resides.

=== Family ===
Winters has 11 children, 10 of whom are artists including Dorothy Winters, Bella Winters, Blanche Winters. Her daughter, Blanche Winters learned to sew from Winters and is a textile artist. Winters has grandchildren and great-grandchildren who are artistic, of one which is Morgan Flowers-Winters.

Winters continues to pass her teachings and knowledge to her children and students, in an effort to preserve Inuit knowledge and embroidery to younger generations.

== Career ==
Winters worked as a translator for Inuktitut language.

She is also an entrepreneur, owning her own craft store where she made and sold various garments, such as parkas (Sikipak), mittens as well as jewelry and dolls. Winters used various traditional textiles including seal skin in her work. She is a self-taught artist. One example of her work is, Short Tail Sikipak with Embroidery (2015), featuring her signature embroidery with flowers.

She is known for her embroidery and incorporation of inukuluks (little people) in her art. Winters used inukuluks to represent the interconnectedness of Inuit culture.

== Exhibitions and publications ==
In 1976, Winters showcased her art in the 1976 Montreal Olympics.

=== Collective exhibitions ===
Winters has participated in various exhibitions:

==== SakKijâjuk: Art and Craft from Nunatsiavut (February 2015 – May 2019) ====
An exhibition at the Mackenzie Art Gallery located in Regina, Saskatchewan.

The word "SakKijâjuk" means "to be visible" paying homage to Nunatsiavut history of underrepresentation and lack of recognition and their resilience. Until 2005, Nunatsiavut people were not recognized as Indigenous by Newfoundland when they joined Canada. As a result, Nunatsiavut peoples received little recognition and were not eligible for any federally funded Inuit art initiatives.

==== Nunatsiavut / Our Beautiful Land (October 2019 – November 2019) ====
Held at La Guilde, an art gallery located in Montreal, Quebec.

=== Publications ===
Winters has authored her own children's book about her experience as a Residential School survivor, titled Reflections from Them Days: A Residential School Memoir from Nunatsiavut published in September 2020.

She has co-authored a research article, titled Plants in a 'Sea of Relationships': Networks of Plants and Fishing in Makkovik, Nunatsiavut (Labrador, Canada) in 2017 using inukuluks to represent the interconnectedness of Inuit culture.

== Honours and recognition ==
In 2021, Elder Winters was given an Honorary doctorate degree of doctor of laws, honoris causa from Memorial University for her cultural and art contributions.

In 2024, Winters and her family was interviewed for Land and Sea, an Atlantic documentary CBC showcasing Atlantic culture and important figures.

== Bibliography ==
- Igloliorte, Heather (June 23, 2021). "How 3 Nunatsiavut Women Artists Contribute to the History of Labrador" 2. Inuit Art Quarterly.
- Winters, Jessica. "Nellie Winters." Inuit Art Quarterly, 15 Sep. 2022.
- Nellie Winters – Artist Profile. YouTube, 12 July 2017.
