= Fairview Cemetery (Niagara Falls) =

Cemetery in Niagara Falls, Canada

Coordinates: 43.108°N 79.089°W

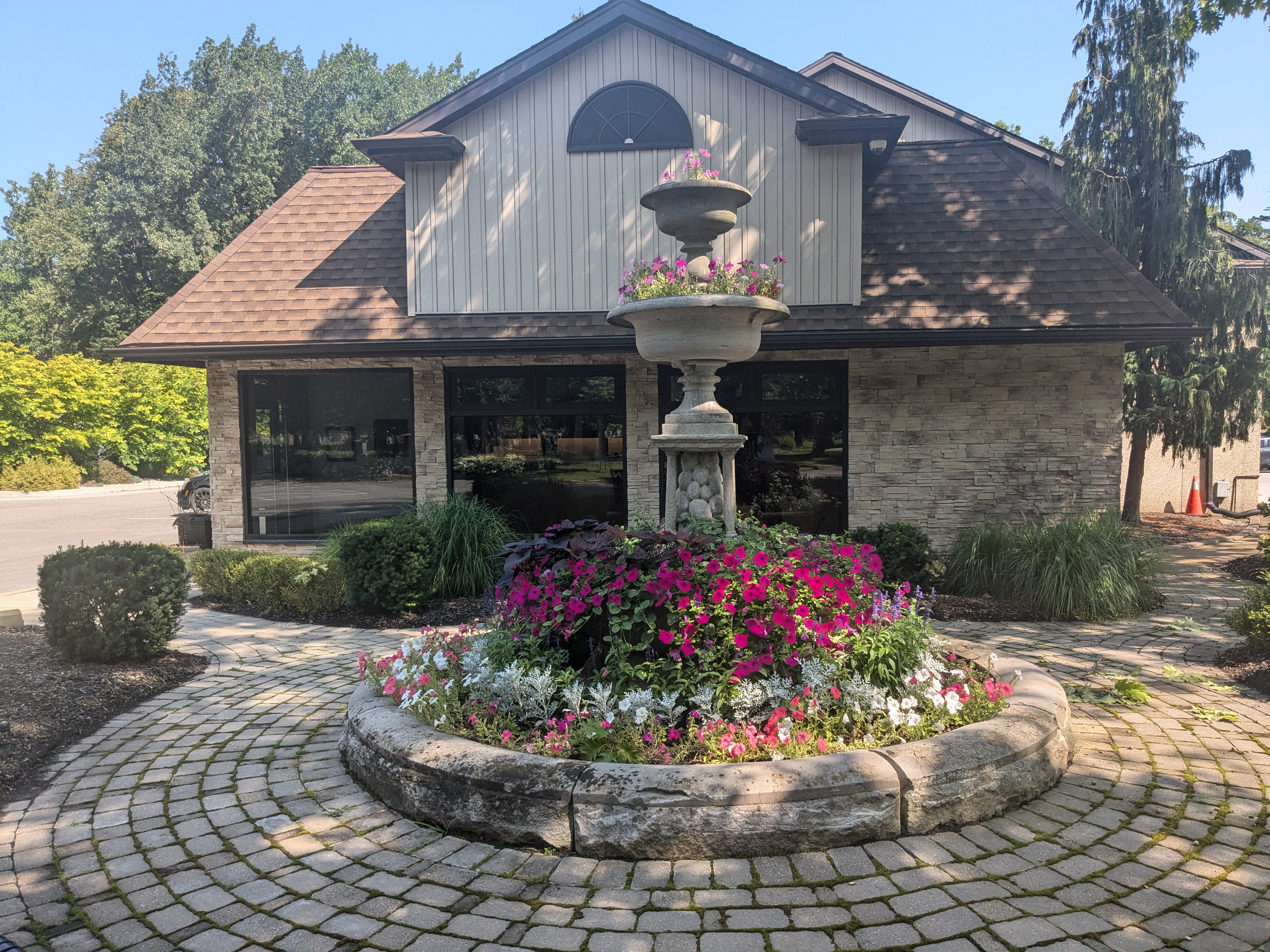
Fountain and main office at Fairview Cemetery

Fairview Cemetery is a cemetery in Niagara Falls, Canada. It was first established in 1883. The cemetery was originally 23 acres, but has since expanded to 77.6 acres.

== History ==
In 1883, the cemetery was established by a committee for the Town of Niagara Falls and 23 acres of land was purchased for this purpose.

In 2003, the cemetery established its first columbarium named Trillium Court. As of 2024, there are two 48-niche units and seven units with 72 to 84 niches. A project to establish 524 more niches will be completed in 2028. Niagara Fall's city council directly contributed $345,000 in funding, with the remaining $532,000 being taken from their reserves, due to the increased rate of cremation from the city's residents.

In 2017, Willow's Rest, a green burial site, opened near the west end of Stanley Avenue. It is named after a weeping willow that is within the two acre burial site, and is an open field bordered by 100 trees. The site has a small cremation site and can accommodate 500 graves. Grants were used to fund the initiative: CN's EcoConnexion invested $25,000 and Land Care Niagara invested $40,000. The first burial occurred before the site officially opened. In September 2019, a restored stone and granite cenotaph was moved to Fairview Cemetery. The cenotaph honours veterans who served in World War I and was originally constructed in 1950. In September 2019, trees were planted at the Fairview Cemetery as part of TD Tree Day. 450 native trees and shrubs were planted by 85 volunteers and Toronto-Dominion Bank employees. The TD Friends of the Environment Foundation provided a $7,000 grant to support the project.

== Notable burials ==
- Ralph Bowman, professional hockey player
- Bill Cupolo, professional hockey player
