= Nellie Longsworth =

American historian

Nellie Leber Longsworth (March 29, 1933 – March 1, 2021) was an American historian and advocate of historic preservation. She was a founder and president of the nonprofit Preservation Action for twenty-two years. She worked to preserve historic structures by working and lobbying to pass legislation in United States Congress.

== Education ==
Longsworth attended Smith College interested in American history, architecture, and culture. She graduated in 1955 with a Bachelor's of Arts in American studies. She also attended the Harvard Graduate School of Design as a Loeb Fellow in 1987.

== Career ==
Longsworth worked in different areas of politics and professions. In 1966, she headed the campaign office for Robert Griffin's Senate race in Michigan. She then was the development director of the Washington D.C. Planned Parenthood.

In 1975, Longsworth was the founding president of the nonprofit Preservation Action. Longsworth was interviewed and selected for the position by Tersh Boasberg despite not having a background in historic preservation. After her acceptance of the position as founding president of Preservation Action, Longsworth engaged in an effort to stop the destruction of a building at her undergraduate college of Smith College. From March 1976 until December 1976, Longsworth and others advocated for the preservation of the Alumnae Gymnasium on Smith's campus. The advocates were successful and the structure was preserved and adapted to be the area of the library that holds collections of women's history and literature.

During her early career in Preservation Action, Longsworth was the only staff member. She worked to establish a tax credit for historic preservation. Longsworth also secured government funding and resources for historic preservation efforts. She was seen as the primary contact for Congress on historic preservation related issues. Longsworth also lobbied landowners, did grassroots campaigning, mentored interns in the field, among other actions in her position.

Longsworth also advocated within the profession. in 1984, the list of candidates for the open president seat at the National Trust for Historic Preservation in 1984 did not include a woman. Longsworth and other women in the historic preservation field created a list of women candidates to be considered for the president position but none of them were considered for the role. These women gathered for the following years to discuss and advocate for women in historic preservation, including advocating for women to hold leadership roles and receive recognition for their work in the field.

She served on the board of trustees for the DC Preservation League in 1987.

In 1988, Longsworth started teaching at Columbia University's Graduate School of Architecture and Planning. She taught on the subject of politics of historic preservation, including funding and public policy. She later taught at the University of Pennsylvania as a professor for their Masters of Historic Preservation program. Longsworth co-taught a class with an international preservation architect and an architectural historian.

She served as president of the Preservation Action for twenty-two years until her retirement in 1998.

After her retirement from Preservation Action, Longsworth became a government affairs consultant for the American Cultural Resources Association (ACRA) and Society for Historical Archaeology. In these positions, Longsworth continued her work in public policy and historic preservation.

== Awards and recognition ==
Longsworth was recognized by several organizations for her work in the field of historic preservation. In 1992, she received the President's Citation from the American Institute of Architects. Longsworth won the National Trust for Historic Preservation award of the 1997 Trustees Award for Outstanding Achievement in Public Policy.

At the National Preservation Conference in 2007, Longsworth received the National Trust's highest honor, the Louise DuPont Crowninshield Award. In 2008, she was awarded the ACRA Lifetime Achievement Award. She was recognized in Congress on different occasions by Congressperson Chris Van Hollen and Congressperson Constance A. Morella for her work in the field.

The Nellie Longsworth Fund was established with the Center for Preservation Initiatives. The fund sponsored people with master's degrees in preservation to advance their career who have shown their leadership on a national, state, or local level in historic preservation.

== Personal life ==
Longsworth had three children. Outside of her career, she enjoyed spending time gardening and hiking. She died on March 1, 2021.

== Written works ==
- Dunning, D., Longsworth, N. L., Chintz, A., Segal, R., & Boston University. (1983). Another revolution in New England: Preservation and development join forces : a study of use of the tax incentives for historic rehabilitation. Washington, D.C.: Preservation Action. OCLC 14193837
