= Nellie Yarborough =

African American Pentecostal bishop, pastor, and community activist

- Born: June 18, 1925
- Died: December 8, 2012 (aged 87)

Nellie Constance Yarborough (June 18, 1925 – December 8, 2012) was an African American Pentecostal bishop, pastor, and community activist based in Boston, Massachusetts. As the first female bishop of the Mt. Calvary Holy Church, she became a figure in both church and civic leadership, advocating for peace, education, and mental health services. Her impact extended across the Boston area, where she was affectionately known as "Momma Nellie."

== Early life ==
Yarborough was born on June 18, 1925, in Orange County, North Carolina. She was the tenth of eleven children born to Reverend Anderson Yarborough and Bessie Warren-Yarborough. She was baptized at White Oak Grove Baptist Church, where her father served as pastor.

In the 1940s, Yarborough attended a revival led by Dr. Brumfield Johnson, founder of Mount Calvary Holy Church. She became a child preacher and one of Johnson’s protégés, traveling with him and eventually becoming his administrative assistant. Her early ministry involved church planting and leadership development in Durham, Buffalo, and Boston.

Yarborough studied at American Bible School of Theology, Chandler Secretarial School for Women, Boston State College and Massachusetts Institute of Technology. She earned a bachelor's in Religion and Philosophy from Eastern Nazarene College and a master's in Business Administration and Management from Cambridge College.

== Church leadership ==
Yarborough began serving as Assistant Pastor of Mt. Calvary Holy Church–Boston in 1962. In 1972, she was appointed senior pastor, a role she held until her death in 2012. She led the church through expanding its ministries to include a soup kitchen, mental health services, and youth outreach programs that addressed critical needs in the Boston community.

In 1994, she made history by becoming one of the first female bishops of the Mt. Calvary Holy Church of America. Her consecration broke gender barriers within the denomination and marked a turning point for women in Pentecostal leadership. She later served on the denomination's Board of Bishops and as Jurisdictional Bishop.

Yarborough held multiple national leadership positions within the denomination including: National Executive Secretary, National Youth Vice-President (1948–1982), National Corresponding Secretary, National President of the Fellowship Conference, State Treasurer and Missionary Convention National Secretary.

== Advocacy ==
In 1980, following the killing of Gerald White in Dorchester, she joined other African-American clergy in calling for nonviolent responses and community healing. Yarborough was a founding member of several organizations, including Project RIGHT, the Black Ministerial Alliance of Boston and the United Pentecostal Ministers Council. She also served on boards and coalitions such as Blue Hill Task Force, Ten Point Coalition, Vision New England Advisory Board, Dorchester Task Force, Hunger Hotline Pantry Network and the College of Afro-American Caucus.

Her church became a community hub, offering food pantries, clothing ministries, educational forums, and mental health support for more than four decades. She also founded two educational institutions: the Dr. Brumfield Johnson Christian Academy and the N.C.Y. Bible Institute.

== Awards and recognition ==
Bishop Yarborough received numerous local and national honors, including:

- Governor’s Citation (2008) from Governor Deval Patrick and Lt. Governor Timothy Murray.
- Living Legend Award, Mt. Calvary Holy Church International (2004).
- Matriarch of Ministry Award, Boston Ten-Point Coalition.
- One of Boston’s Greater Women, Black Ministerial Alliance (2011).
- WISE Women Award, Judah Ministries (2008).
- Channel 7 People Salute (1991).
- Street naming: Bishop Nellie Yarborough Square (2012).

At the time of her death, she was enrolled in a Doctorate of Education program. In 2012, she was celebrated as the oldest graduate of Boston's Parent University. In 2023, she was recognized as one of Boston’s most admired and influential Black women leaders by the Black Women Lead Banner Project.
