= Nellie Choy Wong =

Chinese pharmacist and cookbook author

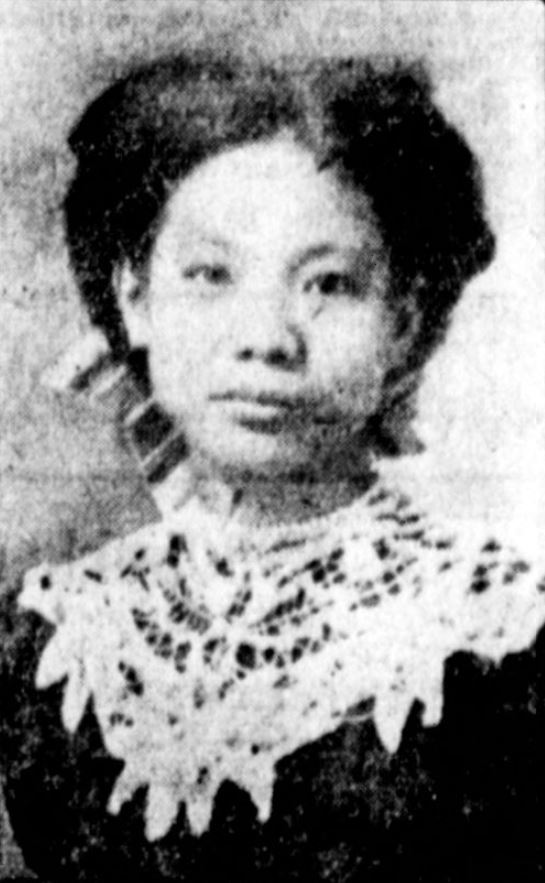
- Wong in 1911
- Born: 1893; Canton, China
- Died: c. 1934
- Education: Columbia University
- Occupations: Pharmacist, cookbook author
- Years active: 1920–1930

Nellie Choy Wong (1893 – c. 1934) was the first Chinese woman to become a pharmacist in America and the first Chinese woman to publish a Chinese cookbook in English.

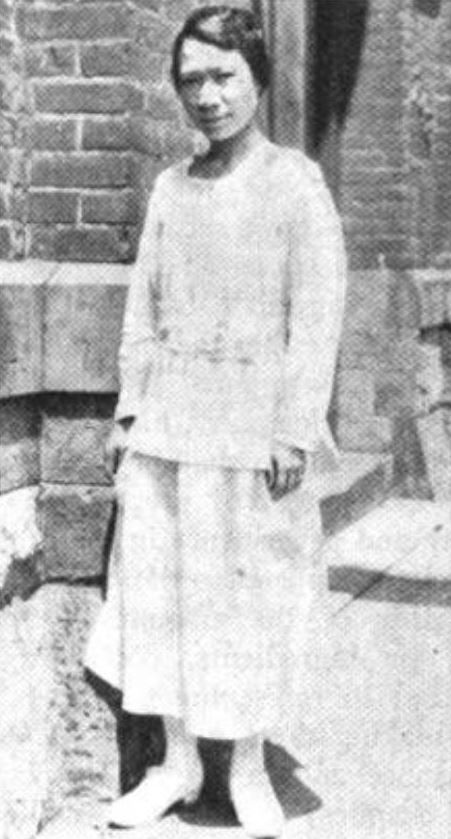
Nellie Choy Wong in 1920.

== Early life and education ==
Born in Canton, China in 1893, Wong's early life was marked by hardship. She was stolen from her parents in China at the age of eight and sold into slavery, eventually finding her way to Hawaii. At the age of fourteen, she managed to escape her captors and sought refuge at the Girls' Industrial Home, which protected her from her former master. With the help of a matron, she found a home where she could support herself and attend Central Grammar School.

Driven by a strong desire to pursue education, Wong expressed her aspirations at the age of 18, stating, "I have always wanted to increase my education by every dignified and honest means." She wrote a letter to Lasell Seminary, inquiring about admission and expressing her willingness to work to finance her education. Through selling subscriptions to magazines, taking care of children, and various odd jobs, Wong managed to make her way from Pasadena, where she graduated from high school, to Massachusetts with only five dollars in her pocket.

One woman sponsored her for a year at Tufts Medical School, but the language barrier made it too challenging for her to complete the course. Undeterred, Wong worked in drug stores to support herself through the School of Pharmacy in New York. Eventually, she earned a Ph.G degree from Columbia University in 1920. During this time, she also attended the Teachers' Training College with the aim of teaching fellow Chinese women the art and science of pharmacy.

== Career ==
Wong graduated with high honors from Columbia University, and after passing the state pharmacy board examination in Providence, Rhode Island, she began her career at the Heegaard-Sloan Drug Company's store in Buffalo, New York. Despite receiving a lucrative offer of $200 a month from a large manufacturing drug concern in Detroit, she declined it. Instead, after graduation, she chose to return to China and serve as the head of the department of pharmacy at the Church General Hospital in Wuchang, with as little as $30 a month as salary.

In 1920, Nellie Choy Wong embarked on a journey to raise funds, giving talks before Rotary clubs in Buffalo, Niagara Falls, Detroit, Cleveland, and traveling west to San Francisco to sail back to China. Her speaking engagements covered a range of topics, including the political situation in China and the commercial development of the country.

Wong's ultimate goal was to establish a pharmacy college in China. She promised to make an exhaustive study of the medicinal herbs of China and to contribute the results to pharmaceutical literature in America. In a quote from a talk she gave in 1919, she highlighted the vast opportunities for American enterprise in China, emphasizing the limited number of registered pharmacies in the country despite the significant export of drugs and spices.

However, Wong encountered challenges and difficulties in China. In a letter she wrote to her former employer, H.A. Sloan in Buffalo, she expressed her struggles with the living conditions, including the need to beg for water as it had to be carried by a worker to the third floor of the hospital. She battled illness due to the dirt, food, and harsh weather. Her room had cracks, which allowed snow to enter, and she had to fill them with papers and burn magazines to keep the room warm. Wong also found the hospital and the city of Wuchang somewhat boring and sought solace in visiting Hankou on her days off to meet friends from around the world.

As Wong's health deteriorated and her efforts to advance pharmacy in China seemed unresponsive, she decided to leave her work in Wuchang. She subsequently opened a drugstore in Beijing, where she provided drugs and beauty products to influential and affluent women. In the 1930s, she became involved in the perfumery business.

In addition to her accomplishments in the field of pharmacy, Wong made significant contributions to culinary literature. Her writings on Chinese cookery were published in magazines such as Good Housekeeping and Vogue. In 1927, she published her first cookbook, titled Chinese Recipes, through The American Rehabilitation Committee, Inc. The cookbook was revised and enlarged in 1933 and published by Kelly and Walsh under the title Chinese Dishes for Foreign Homes. Wong holds the distinction of being the first Chinese woman to publish a Chinese cookbook in English.

== Death and legacy ==
In 1928, Nellie Choy Wong established a small fund of about $100 at Lasell Seminary as the beginning of a fund to build a college in China. However, a few years later, she requested the return of the fund due to her hospitalization with tuberculosis. Unfortunately, attempts to reach her were unsuccessful, and details of her later years remain unclear.

In 1935, the Honolulu Advertiser reported that the American Consulate in Shanghai was searching for relatives of the late Nellie Choy Wong, a Hawaiian-born Chinese who had died in Shanghai the previous year. The consulate aimed to settle her estate, which included stocks and bonds held by the Hawaiian Trust Co., a savings account in the National City Bank of New York, Shanghai branch, and royalties from her published book. Despite efforts to locate her relatives, no one came forward, and a first circuit court notice was issued in 1956 for her estate.

== Works ==
- Chinese Recipes (1927)
- Chinese Dishes for Foreign Homes: A Revised and Enlarged Edition of 'Chinese Recipes' (1933)
- Chinese Dishes for Foreign Homes (1933)
