= Nellie Boswell =

British equestrian performer

- Born: 1858 or 1859; Paris, France
- Died: 21 May 1938; Blackpool, England

Ellen Clara "Nellie" Boswell later Nellie Cattle (1858/9 – 21 May 1938) was a British equestrian performer.

== Life ==
Boswell was born in Paris in 1858 or 1859. Her father, James Clement Boswell was a well known performer in Paris as an acrobatic clown. He would perform upside down with his head on a pole as his trained animals performed around him. He died from a cerebral injury caused by his act in 1858.

She worked in Hengler's Circus for 20 years. She would perform on the back of a moving horse creating different characters. She would change costumes as the horse was moving and was known for performing The Sailor's Hornpipe as if the ground was stationary.

Boswell continued to perform until 1892. She was interviewed at the World's Fair in Chicago in 1935. She died a widow at her home in Blackpool on 1938.

== Private life ==
She was the second wife of a circus clown named Frederick Isaac Cattle known as "Comic Cattle. They married on 30 October 1878. Their children included William who climbed unsupported ladders in his act.
