= Quander family =

Oldest documented African-American family in the United States

Quander
- Current region: America
- Earlier spellings: Quandoe; Quando; Kwando
- Etymology: Amkwandoh
- Origin: Fante Confederacy
- Founder: Egya Amkwandoh

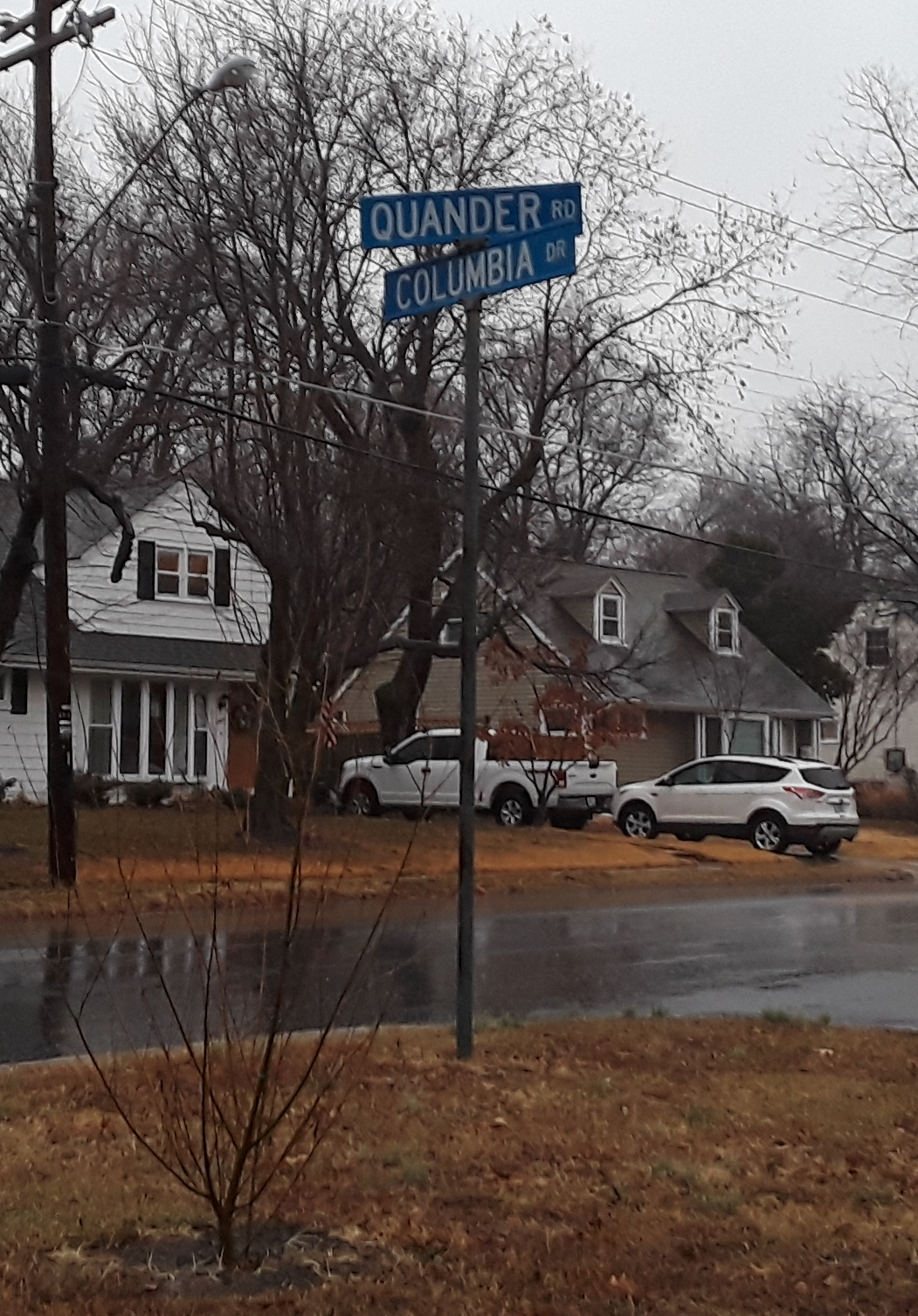
The Quander family is remembered in various places around Fairfax County, Virginia, including Quander Road, a road that passes through the Groveton CDP and the Belle Haven CDP

The Quander family is believed to be the oldest documented African-American family that has come from African ancestry to present day America. Historians believe so because they cannot find any records of any other African-American family whose ancestry has been consistently kept and published.

The Quanders are from the Fanti tribe of the Akan peoples. Their origins began in Ghana, and now the majority resides in either Maryland or Virginia/Washington DC and more recently parts of Pennsylvania.

== History ==
=== Origin ===
The Quanders originated from the Fanti tribe in Ghana. A man by the name of Egya Amkwandoh was kidnapped during the African slave trade in the late 17th century and transported to the United States. (Note: As seen in another Washington Post article, the family historian unidentified in the "Roots"/Washington Post interview-article is Rohulamin Quander.) According to official slave records, when slave owners asked for his name, he answered “Amkwandoh,” which was misinterpreted as “I am Quando.’ The next few generations of Quanders went by the name Quando rather than Quander. Other variations used include Quandoe and Kwando. The name became recognized as the present day pronunciation “Quander” during the 19th century. Egya Amkwandoh had two sons, who were both taken away from him and split up. One was sent to Maryland and the other sent to Virginia. The first known records of the “Quando” family existing as free people come from the Maryland side, specifically the family member Henry Quando. A slave owner by the name of Henry Adams from Port Tobacco, Charles County, Maryland, included the freedom of the Maryland Quandos in his will on October 13, 1684. The Quandos who reside in Virginia are related to George Washington, as well as the ones who remained in slavery up until the death of Martha Washington.

Where the family's freed members acquired land, Quander Road and later Quander Road Elementary School (now known as Quander School) were named after the family. At least one home built along Quander Road has been standing for 100 years.

=== Slavery to George Washington ===
Nancy Quander and her mother Sukey Bay were amongst the slaves who worked on the grounds of George Washington's Mount Vernon. Nancy Quander worked as a spinner for the Washington family and began her work once she was of age; 13 years old. She worked in a small back room behind the slave quarters. The slave quarters were two one-story wings, one a female wing and the other male. Even if the slaves were married, they had to sleep separately. The quarters consisted of a working area and sleeping room, both of which had conditions that were unsanitary in addition to being small, and every room contained a fireplace as well.

In his will George Washington stated that he wanted his 124 slaves to be released upon the death of his wife, Martha Washington. George Washington died on December 14, 1799, with Martha signing a deed of manumission in December 1800, and the slaves were set free on January 1, 1801. On that date, Nancy Quander being one of the slaves included in Washington's will, was freed. She returned to his tombstone with ten others about 30 years later to pay their respects in what was attributed to their loyalty to Washington, whom they claimed to have been like a father.

=== Religion ===
The family is heavily Catholic (despite the early influence of the largely Protestant or Deist Washingtons), and one of their early communities was named "Chapel Hill" after the Catholic chapel near their homestead. At least one recent reunion was hosted by Incarnation Catholic Church in DC (with a family history stop at St Mary's in Upper Marlboro, Maryland), and one recent family event was a Lenten fish fry held at Incarnation as well.

== Family reunions ==
There are three branches of Quanders; those who reside in Maryland, those who reside in the Virginia/Washington, D.C. area and those that reside in Pennsylvania in Philadelphia and surrounding areas. The family belongs to the African-American upper class.

The Quanders of Virginia and Washington DC have been celebrating annual family reunions since 1926. The Quanders of Maryland did not begin the tradition until 1974. The Quanders had their 85th family reunion at Mount Vernon for the first time in 2010, returning to the grounds on which their family was once enslaved. The family placed boxwood twigs and cuttings on the slave memorial in memory and respect to their ancestors who worked the grounds.

== Noteworthy Quanders ==
=== Henry Quando ===
A son or grandson of Egya Amkwandoh—the first Quander brought to America through the Trans-Atlantic slave trade—Henry established himself in Maryland to build a family and eventually become freed in 1684. He was one of the first black males to adopt and act on the idea of civil rights, stemming from legal altercations involving his wife and daughters.

=== Charles Henry Quander ===
Charles Quander is the father of Nancy Quander, and worked on Hayfield Plantation, a slave plantation in present-day Fairfax County (the land of which is now Hayfield Secondary School). Once he was freed (probably after the Civil War), he bought two acres of land at a time up until his holdings amounted to 88 acres. When he died, his land around what became Quander Road was divided up among his children and then subsequently among their heirs.

=== Nancy Carter Quander ===
Nancy Carter Quander, one of the daughters of George Washington's slave Suckey Bay and by virtue a slave herself, married Charles Quander of Maryland following her release to freedom. She was a spinner and landscaper; records have been found and kept of her work on the Mount Vernon grounds. She worked in the back room of the slave housing, spinning cloth for George Washington's garments. It is believed that she was unable to read or write, therefore after her release from Mount Vernon, no records can be found of her life thereafter.

=== Nellie Quander ===
Nellie Quander was a 1910 initiate of Alpha Kappa Alpha sorority and served as its first international president. She led a group of five other sorority members (which included two founders) which ensured Alpha Kappa Alpha's perpetuity by securing legal incorporation on January 29, 1913. This strategic move enabled Alpha Kappa Alpha to grow by establishing chapters throughout the United States and, later, abroad. It also protected the name, colors, symbols and integrity of the organization. Nellie Quander also is closely related to George Washington as she is a direct descendant of West Ford, son of Bushrod Washington, who was George Washington's nephew.

=== Elizabeth Ann Quander ===
Elizabeth Ann Quander was one of the first lead singers with the Duke Ellington Band. For a ceremony in her honor, she sang at the White House for president Jimmy Carter in 1977, long after her retirement.

=== Gladys Quander Tacil ===
Gladys Quander Tancil was a historical interpreter at Mount Vernon who worked to improve the historic site's coverage of enslaved people, including members of the Quander family.

=== James Quander ===
James Quander was the first permanent deacon ordained after the Catholic Church revived the office, and was also one of the first people to use insulin as a treatment for diabetes.

=== Rohulamin Quander ===
Rohulamin Quander (1944-2025) was the founding president of the Quander Historical Society, as well as a retired Administrative Judge for the District of Columbia, Washington, D.C. He earned both his B.A. and J.D. degrees from Howard University Washington, D.C. He was married to Carmen Torruella Quander, a well-known representational artist. They had three adult children and one grandchild. He was notable for documenting the history of the Quander family, primarily through his published work, 'The Quanders: Since 1684, an Enduring African American Legacy.' Originally published in 2021, the book has been updated periodically to include present events, with the latest edition published in 2024.

=== Jay Quander ===
Jahmond “Jay” Quander is a descendant of the Quanders that worked on the Mount Vernon Estate, and established their freed slave community where Quander Road and Quander Road School stand. Some family members still live on the land acquired after their ancestor's release. Jay is now the Director of Food and Beverage at the Estate in which his family was enslaved.

=== Paul Alonzo Quander Jr. ===
Paul Alonzo Quander Jr. (1954 - 2016) was the Washington, D.C deputy mayor for public safety and justice, with responsibility for the police and fire departments, and for six months was acting chief of staff for then Mayor Vincent C. Gray.

=== Michael Quander ===
Michael Quander is a former television journalist for WMAR-TV in Baltimore, Maryland, WREG-TV in Memphis, Tennessee, and WUSA-TV in Washington, D.C., consecutively between 2012 and 2021. He won a 2018 National Capital/Chesapeake Bay Emmy Award for "Historic/Cultural - No Time Limit" for his segment on his family's history. He has since moved on to consulting work.

=== Mark Quander ===
Brig. Gen. Mark Quander grew up near Mt. Vernon. In 2021, he was appointed second-in-command at West Point. In an NPR story about his new role, he was described as the fourth member of the Quander family to serve as a general officer in the U.S. military.

== See also ==
- Ashworth family
- Bustill family
- Chavis family
- Gibson family (Virginia)
- Syphax family
- Vaughan family
