= M. Beatrice Smith =

American sorority founder

- Born: Minnie Beatrice Smith; February 18, 1882; Washington, D.C., U.S.
- Died: December 1, 1918 (aged 36); Washington, D.C., U.S.
- Other name: Beadie
- Education: Washington Normal School No. 2 Howard University
- Occupation: Teacher
- Known for: founder of Alpha Kappa Alpha

Minnie Beatrice Smith (February 18, 1882 – December 1, 1918) was an American educator and an incorporator of Alpha Kappa Alpha, the first sorority founded by African-American women.

== Early life ==
Minnie Beatrice "Beadie" Smith was born in Washington, D.C. on February 18, 1882. She was the daughter of Katherine "Kate" (née Jackson) and Willis J. Smith.

Smith attended St. Augustine's School for her elementary education. She recited "Little Edith's Request" at the school's closing exercises in June 1895, where she was presented with the gold medal for lessons. She graduated from a high school in Washington, D.C. in June 1901.

Smith attended Miner Teachers College now known as University of the District of Columbia graduating with a teacher's diploma on June 12, 1903. She enrolled in Howard University, graduating with an A.B. cum laude in June 1912. While at Howard, she was a member of the local sorority Alpha Kappa Alpha.

== Alpha Kappa Alpha ==
After discovering that there were some members who wanted change some symbols of Alpha Kappa Alpha Sorority, Nellie Quander, the immediate past president of the college sorority, contacted Smith and other members to inquire into whether they had agreed to accept the proposed changes.The inquiries received back all favored no acceptance of any changes. As a result, Smith worked with Quander to stop the proposed changes to the organization as well as fulfill the legal requirements for expansion. Smith helped to develop the strategy to preserve the organization and she, Quander, and Norma Boyd completed the necessary requirements for international incorporation. Alpha Kappa Alpha Sorority was legally incorporated on January 29, 1913, making it the first black sorority and the first black collegiate sorority to be incorporate. Smith served as the national sorority's first grammateus or secretary. In 1916, she became its second Supreme Basileus or president.

== Career ==
After graduating from the Washington Normal School, Smith taught at the Mott School in Washington, D.C. She continued to teach while attending Howard University.

== Personal life ==
Smith was a member of the Women's Frederick Douglas Benefit Association and St. Augustine Catholic Church. She contracted the Spanish influenza in November 1918. She died a few days later at her home in Washington, D.C. on December 1, 1918. Her funeral was held at her home at 1518 Corcoran Street Northwest, followed by mass at St. Augustine Catholic Church.
