= List of Alpha Kappa Alpha members =

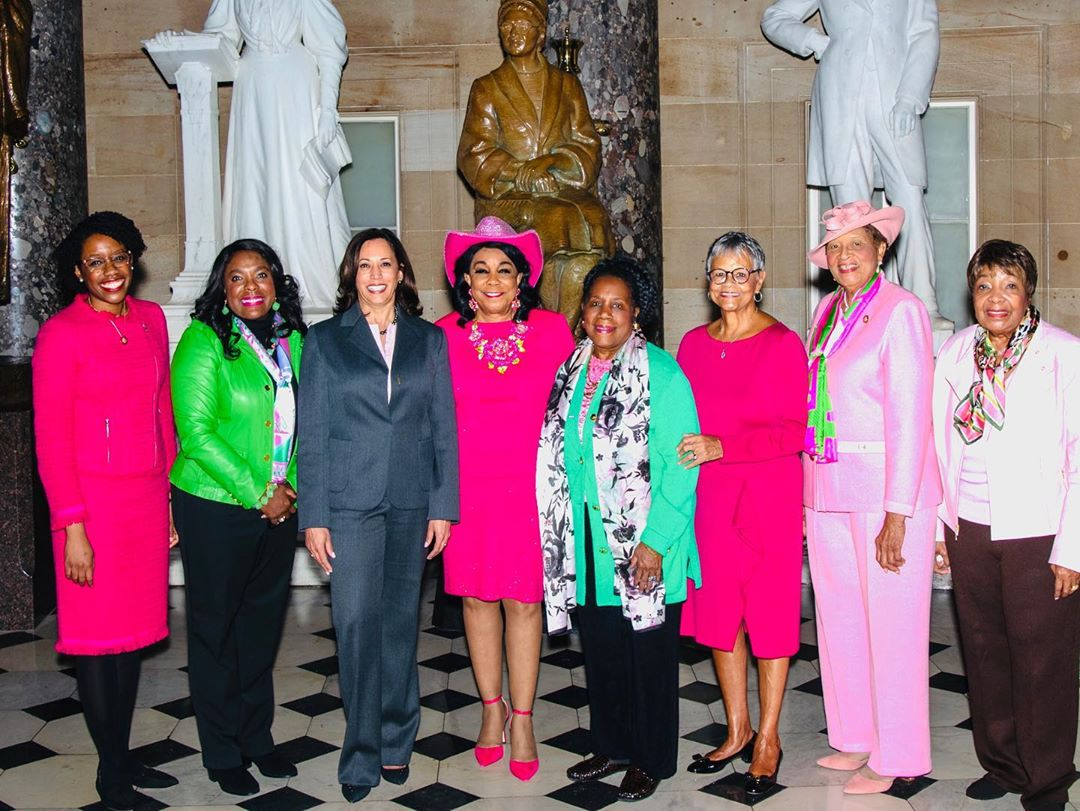
U.S. Congress members who are Alpha Kappa Alpha sisters

Alpha Kappa Alpha was the first inter-collegiate Greek-letter sorority established for Black college women. It was founded on January 15, 1908, at Howard University in Washington, D.C.

As of 2025, Alpha Kappa Alpha has a membership of more than 365,000 women in 1,085 chapters in the United States and eleven other countries. Membership is extended to female college undergraduate and graduate students. The sorority also bestows honorary membership as its highest honor.

Listed below are some of the notable Alpha Kappa Alpha women.

== Art ==
Name	Original chapter	Notability	Ref.
Elmer Lucille Allen	Beta Epsilon	ceramic artist; one of the first African-American female chemists in the US	
Mary Parks Washington	Kappa Omega	painter, illustrator, collage artist	

== Authors and journalists ==
Name	Original chapter	Notability	Ref.
Marvel Cooke		first African-American woman to work at a white newspaper, Compass	
Anna Julia Cooper	Alpha	author and feminist	
Edwidge Danticat	Theta Psi Omega	author	
Linsey Davis	Theta Kappa	ABC News anchor	
Leslie Esdaile Banks		author	
Lolita Files	Iota Lambda	author	
Ayana Gray	Kappa Iota	author of Beasts of Prey	
Shirlee Taylor Haizlip		author and the first woman to manage a television station in the US	
Germany Kent	Lambda Eta	award-winning author, celebrity journalist, actress, model, and producer	
Jamilah Lemieux	Delta Rho Omega	writer, senior digital editor for Ebony, and cultural critic	
Felicia Mason		author	
Toni Morrison	Alpha	Nobel Prize-winning author	
Sophia A. Nelson	Xi Omega	author, journalist, lawyer, and political commentator	
Sonia Sanchez	Lambda	poet	
Sandra Seaton	Chi Epsilon Omega	award-winning playwright and librettist	
Reshonda Tate-Billingsley	Delta Xi	journalist and author	
Miki Turner	Sigma Omega	award-winning photojournalist and author	
Ann B. Walker		Journalist and radio personality	

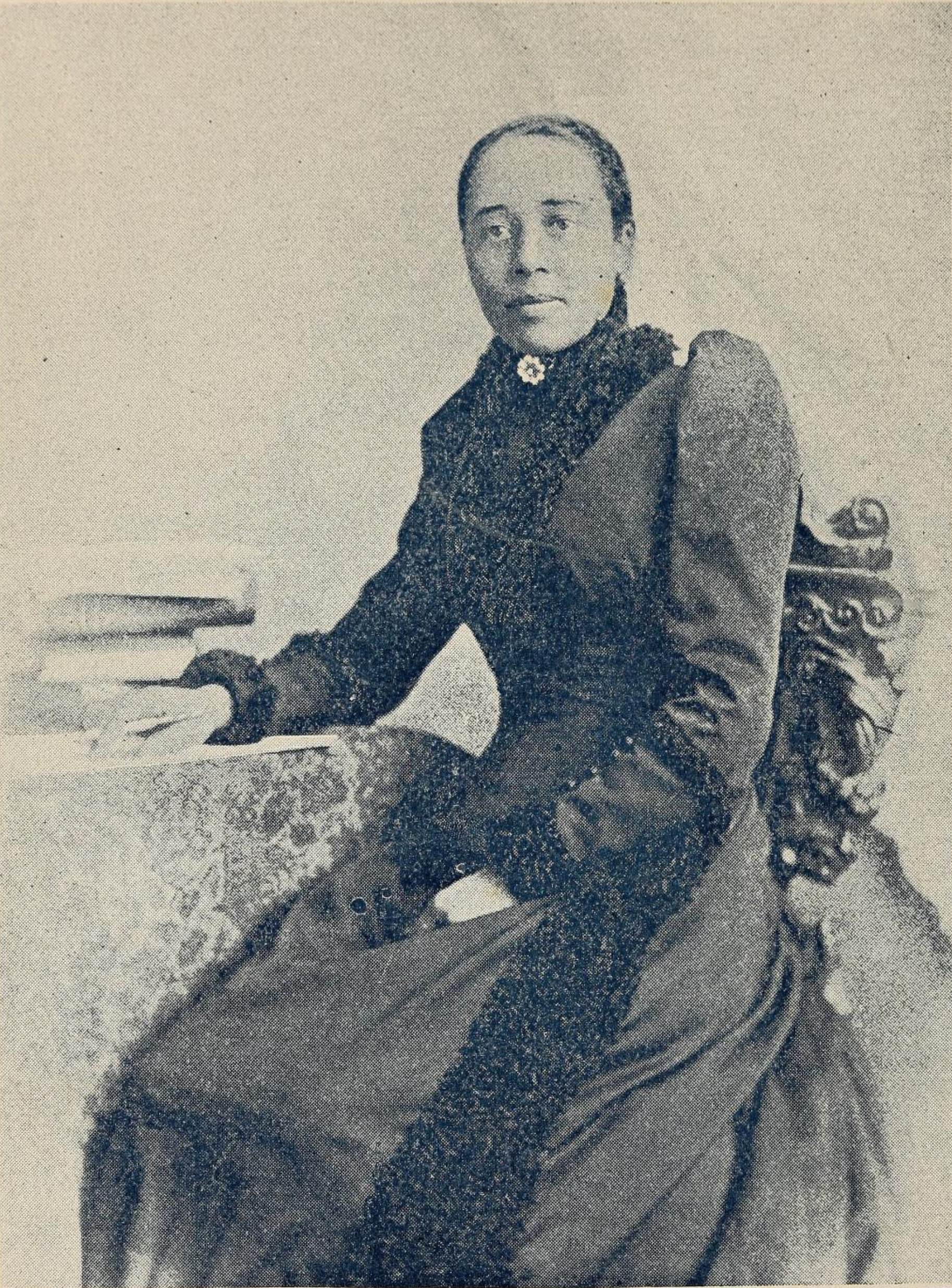
Anna Julia Cooper

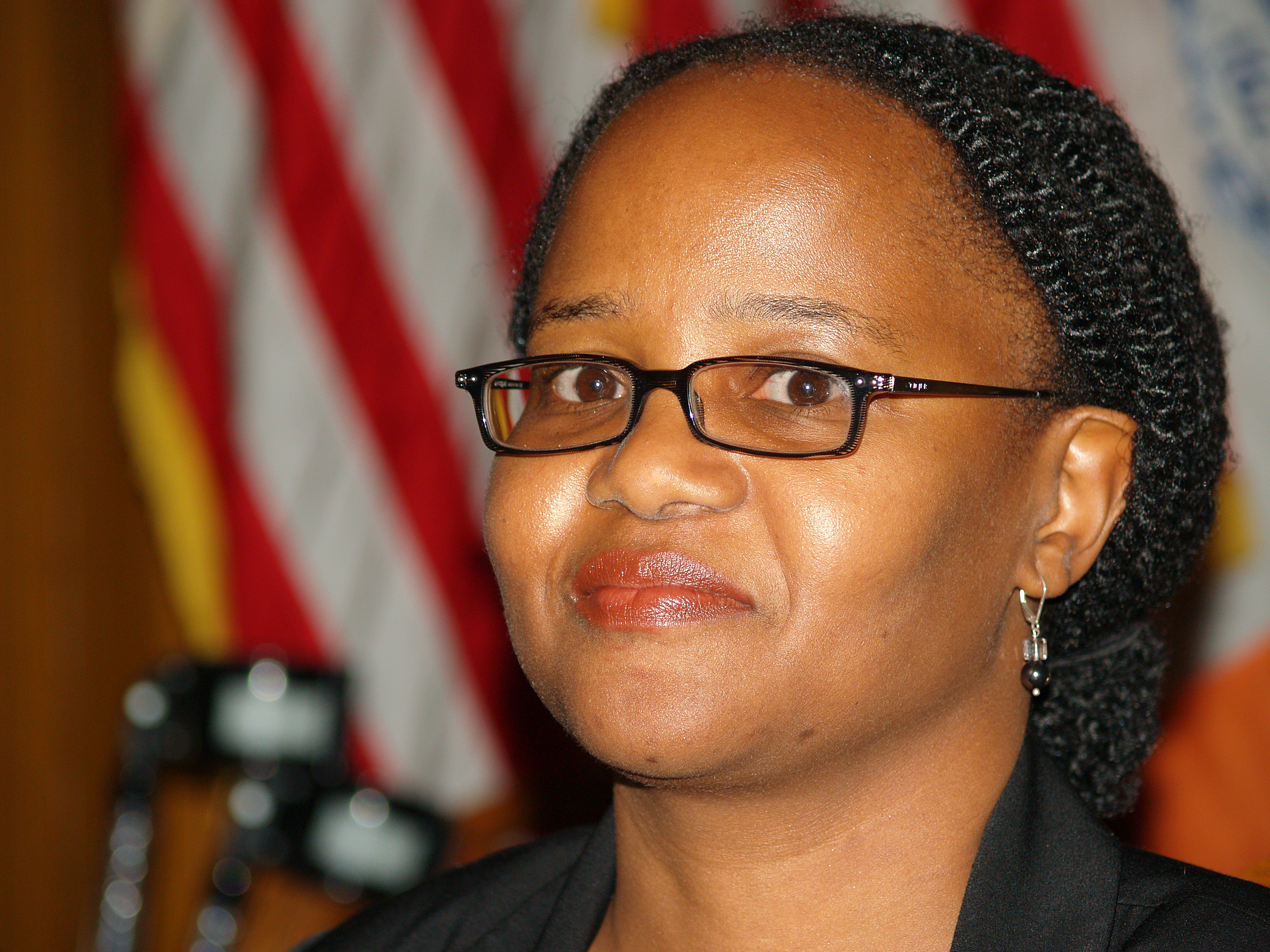
Edwidge Danticat

== Business ==
Name	Original chapter	Notability	Ref.
Jocelyn Cooper	Tau Omega	president of Hitco Music Publishing and former head of A&R at Universal Records	
Alexis McGill Johnson		president and CEO of Planned Parenthood	
Barbara McKinzie		certified public accountant, former Comptroller at the Chicago Housing Authority, and executive director and president of Alpha Kappa Alpha	
Lucille McAllister Scott		co-owner of Atlanta Daily World	

== Civil rights and advocacy ==
Name	Original chapter	Notability	Ref.
ZerNona Black	Alpha Tau Omega	wife of Claude Black; civil rights advocate	
Roslyn Brock	Alpha Eta	Chairman of the NAACP	
Minnijean Brown-Trickey	Delta Beta	one of the Little Rock Nine who integrated Central High School in 1957 in Little Rock, Arkansas	
Septima Poinsette Clark	Gamma Xi Omega	education activist, trained Rosa Parks during workshops at Highlander Folk School School	
Virginia Coffey		civil rights advocate and social reformer	
Pauline Redmond Coggs	Epsilon Kappa Omega	social worker, educator, and civil rights activist	
Ada Sipuel Fisher		desegregated the University of Oklahoma College of Law in Sipuel v. Board of Regents of University of Oklahoma	
Nupol Kiazolu	Gamma Theta	activist and founder of Vote 2000	
Bernice King	Kappa Omega	civil rights leader; daughter of Dr. Martin Luther King Jr.	
Gloria Richardson	Alpha	leader of the Cambridge movement, often cited as the birth of the Black Power Movement	
Rupert Richardson	Zeta Psi Omega	NAACP president from 1992 to 1995	
Viola Duvall Stewart	Alpha	teacher and participant in a lawsuit that led to Brown vs. Board of Education	
Faye Wattleton	Theta	president of Planned Parenthood from 1978 to 1992 and president of Center for the Advancement of Women	
Margaret Bush Wilson	Chi	chaired the NAACP's national board of directors in 1975	

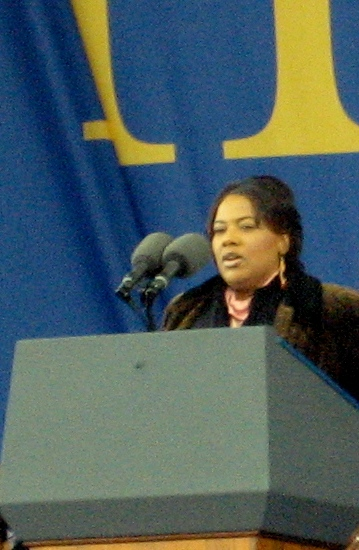
Bernice King

== Education ==
Name	Original chapter	Notability	Ref.
Rose Browne		first black woman to gain a PhD in education from Harvard University; professor at Virginia State University and North Carolina Central University	
Jewel Plummer Cobb	Chi	cancer researcher, former President of California State University, Fullerton	
Marva Collins	Alpha Pi	founder of Westside Preparatory School in Chicago	
Lia Epperson	Lambda Upsilon	Professor of Law, American University Washington College of Law; former Director of Education, Litigation and Policy, NAACP Legal Defense and Educational Fund	
LaTonya Goffney		first Black superintendent of Aldine Independent School District	
Marjorie Hill	Alpha	teacher at Morgan College and Alpha Kappa Alpha founder	
Karla F. C. Holloway	Chi	professor of African American Cultural Studies, Law, and Bioethics at Duke University	
Monique Holsey-Hyman		professor of social work at North Carolina Central University, a former social worker in New York City, and member of the Durham City Council	
Carey B. Maddox-Preston		member of the Chicago Board of Education, social worker, and president of the Chicago Urban League	
Hilda Pinnix-Ragland	Alpha Phi	first woman and first African American to chair the State Board of Community Colleges in North Carolina; vice president of Northern Regions Energy Delivery Services, Progress Energy;	
Donda West	Alpha Eta	Chair of English Department at Chicago State University and mother of Kanye West	
Debra Saunders-White	Theta Kappa	first female Chancellor of North Carolina Central University	

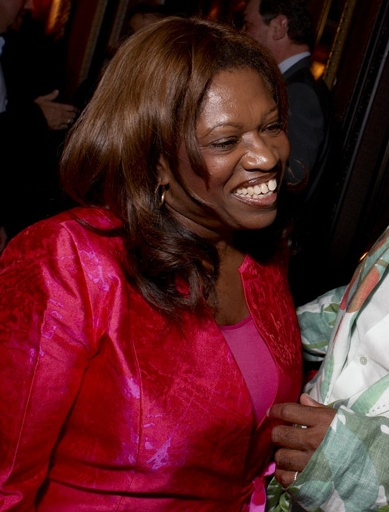
Donda West

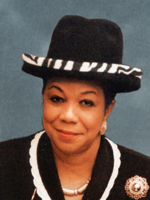
Frederica S. Wilson

== Entertainment ==
=== Acting ===
Name	Original chapter	Notability	Ref.
Yvette Nicole Brown	Delta Pi	actress, film, television, host, and voice	
Vanessa Bell Calloway	Delta Phi	actress in Coming to America	
Loretta Devine	Epsilon Lambda	actress in Waiting to Exhale and This Christmas; one of the original Dreamgirls	
Tanisha Lynn	Lambda	actress; portrayed Danielle Frye on All My Children	
Taylor Polidore	Alpha Pi	actress, roles in Welcome Home, Roscoe Jenkins, Fatal Attraction (TV series), Snapped: Killer Couples, and Bossip Comedy Series	
Phylicia Rashad	Alpha	actress on The Cosby Show, first African-American woman to win a Tony Award for Lead Actress	
Roxie Roker	Alpha	actress on The Jeffersons	
Wanda Sykes	Gamma Theta	actress and comedian	
Regina Taylor	Kappa Mu	Golden Globe-winning actress	

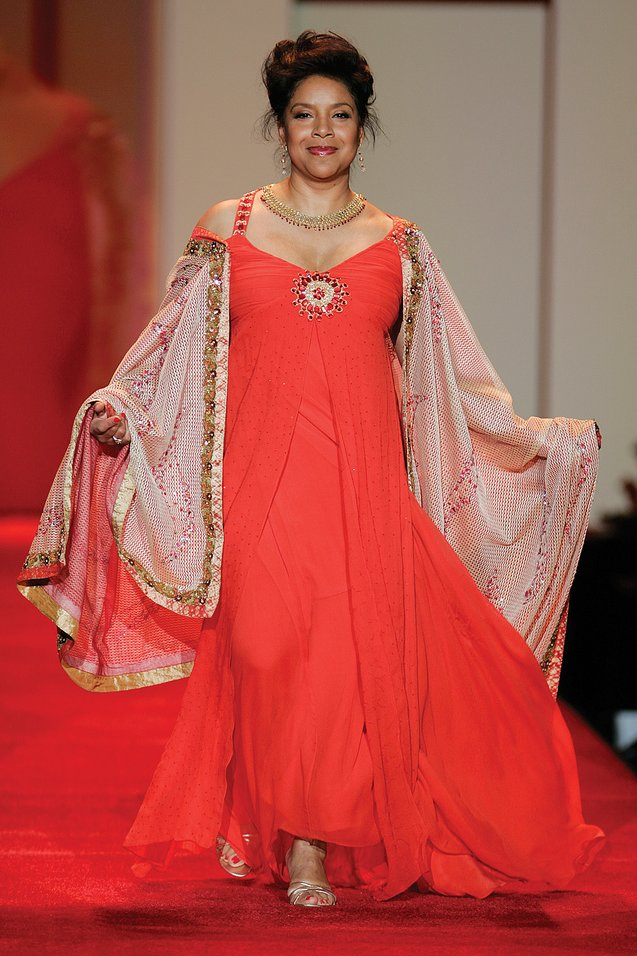
Phylicia Rashad

=== Dancing ===
Name / Original chapter / Notability / Ref.; Liz Williamson / / dancer with Alvin Ailey American Dance Theater

=== Models and pageant titleholders ===
Name	Original chapter	Notability	Ref.
Osas Ighodaro	Pi Iota Omega	Miss Black USA 2010	
Fionnghuala O'Reilly	Mu Delta	Miss Universe Ireland 2019	
Marjorie Vincent	Beta	Miss America 1991; news anchor	

=== Music ===
Name	Original chapter	Notability	Ref.
Anike	Delta Xi	formerly known as Wande; rapper and A&R administrator	
Etta Moten Barnett	Delta	first African-American woman invited to sing at the White House in the 20th century	
Shamari DeVoe	Nu Lambda Omega	R&B singer (Blaque) and reality television personality (Real Housewives of Atlanta)	
Alika Hope	Boulé	opera singer	
Tiffany Monique	Rho Kappa Omega	R&B singer and songwriter; lead background vocalist for Beyoncé	
Cassandra Wilson	Beta Delta Omega	Grammy Award-winning jazz vocalist/producer	
Sherry Winston	Alpha	Grammy-nominated jazz flutist	

=== Television and film ===
Name	Original chapter	Notability	Ref.
Abiola Abrams	Alpha Mu	independent filmmaker, author, actress, and television host	
Yvette Lee Bowser	Xi Beta	writer and producer, Half & Half, Living Single, and A Different World	
Xernona Clayton Brady	Alpha Psi	creator of CNN's Trumpet Awards and creator of the Xernona Clayton Show on WAGA-TV	
Sharon Epperson	Lambda Upsilon	financial correspondent for CNBC	
Sunny Hostin	Upsilon Nu Omega	commentator on The View	
Janice Huff	Zeta Omicron	meteorologist for WNBC in New York City	
Star Jones	Lambda Zeta	author, television host, and attorney	
Depelsha Thomas McGruder	Alpha	Senior Vice-President of Business Operations for MTV	
Wanda Sykes	Gamma Theta	comedian and television personality	
Daphne Valerius	Theta Psi Omega	filmmaker, actress, and television journalist	
JaQuitta Williams	Gamma Upsilon	anchor/reporter for WSB-TV, ABC affiliate in Atlanta, Georgia	

== Health and science ==
Name	Original chapter	Notability	Ref.
Patricia Bath	Lambda	first African-American woman to receive a medical procedure patent, developer of the Cataract Laserphaco Probe in 1988	
Treva Brown		chemist for the United States Naval Research Laboratory	
Dorothy Boulding Ferebee	Epsilon	advocate for women's health; established health clinics in Washington, D.C. and Mississippi	
Joy Harden Bradford		clinical psychologist and creator of the platform Therapy for Black Girls	
Katherine Johnson	Nu	Computer pioneer who helped calculate the trajectory for the 1969 Apollo 11 flight to the Moon	
Dorothy Vaughan	Zeta	The first African-American woman to receive a promotion and supervise a group of staff at NASA	
Mary Jackson	Gamma Theta	NASA's first black female engineer	
Lilian Lewis	Alpha	zoologist and endocrinologist.	
Gladys West	Alpha Epsilon	pivotal in the development of the satellite geodesy models that were eventually incorporated into the GPS; inducted into the United States Air Force Hall of Fame in 2018	

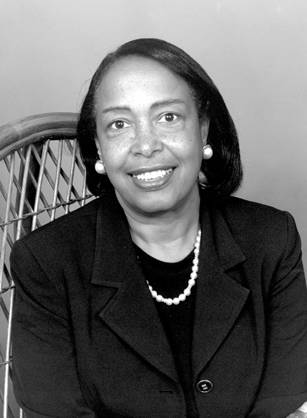
Patricia E. Bath

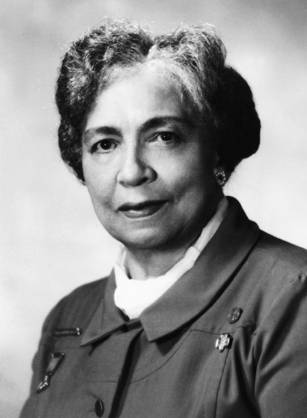
Dorothy Boulding Ferebee

== Law ==
Name	Original chapter	Notability	Ref.
Ada E. Brown	Mu Pi	first African-American woman federal judge in the Northern District of Texas	
Chereé A. Buggs	Epsilon Pi Omega	Judge, Civil Court of the City of New York	
Zina Pickens Cruse	Mu Tau	first African-American woman elected Circuit Judge, 20th Judicial Circuit, State of Illinois	
Dena Douglas	Delta Rho Omega	Judge of the New York Supreme Court 2nd Judicial District	
Lia Epperson	Lambda Upsilon	Professor of Law, American University Washington College of Law and former Director of Education Litigation and Policy, NAACP Legal Defense and Educational Fund	
Leecia Eve	Gamma Phi Omega	counsel to Senator Hillary Clinton	
Toni King	Upsilon Kappa Omega	Judge, District Court of Cumberland County, North Carolina	
Alice O. McCollum	Beta Eta Omega	first African-American female municipal judge, Dayton, Ohio; County Probate Judge for Montgomery County, Ohio	
Vicki Miles-LaGrange	Beta Sigma Omega	first African-American Federal District Judge in Western District of Oklahoma	
Juanita Jackson Mitchell		First African-American woman to practice law in Maryland, civil rights lawyer and activist	
Valerie Brathwaite Nelson	Iota Upsilon	Justice of the Supreme Court of the State of New York	
Peggy Quince	Alpha	first African-American female Supreme Court Justice on the Florida Supreme Court	
Fern Flanagan Saddler	Xi Omega	District of Columbia Superior Court Judge	
Leah Ward Sears	Mu Upsilon	first African-American woman Chief Supreme Court Justice on the Georgia Supreme Court	
Donna Hill Staton	Iota Lambda Omega	first African-American female deputy attorney general in Maryland and first African-American circuit court judge in Howard County, Maryland	

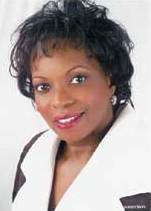
Vicki Miles-LaGrange

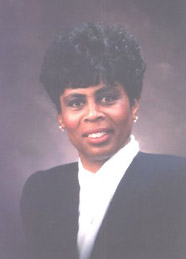
Peggy Quince

== Politics ==
Name	Original chapter	Notability	Ref.
Diane Abbott	Boule	British Labour Party Member of Parliament	
Alma Adams	Beta Iota Omega	Democratic Congresswoman of North Carolina's 12th Congressional District	
Alma Allen	Xi Alpha Omega	Representative to Texas State Legislature	
Angie Elisabeth Brooks	Eta Beta Omega	first African female President of the United Nations General Assembly from Liberia	
Yvonne Brathwaite Burke	Alpha Gamma	U.S. House of Representatives from California	
Eva M. Clayton	Gamma Delta	U.S. House of Representatives from North Carolina	
Bonnie Watson Coleman	Epsilon Upsilon Omega	U.S. House of Representatives from New Jersey	
Vivian Davis Figures	Delta Theta Omega	Alabama Senate	
Katie Hall	Epsilon Pi	U.S. House of Representatives from Indiana	
Kamala Harris	Alpha	first woman of color nominated to be President of the United States; Vice President of the United States; United States Senator from California; California Attorney General	
Esther Haywood	Omicron Eta	Member of the Missouri House of Representatives	
Christina Henderson	Rho Zeta	Member of the Council of the District of Columbia	
Theresa Gillespie Isom		Member of the Mississippi State Senate	
Sheila Jackson-Lee	Alpha Kappa Omega	U.S. House of Representatives from of Texas	
Eddie Bernice Johnson	Alpha Xi Omega	U.S. House of Representatives from Texas	
Jolanda "Jo" Jones	Epsilon Lambda	Texas House of Representatives	
Eleanor Jordan		Kentucky House of Representatives	
Sharon Pratt Kelly	Alpha	first African-American female mayor of a major city, Washington, D.C.	
Mamie E. Locke	Gamma Omicron	Virginia Senate, former mayor of Hampton, Virginia. and Dean School of Liberal Arts at Hampton University	
Jocelyn Mitnaul Mallette	Sigma Tau Omega	Secretary of the North Carolina Department of Military and Veterans Affairs	
Kimberly A. McClain	Xi Omega	first African-American female U.S. Assistant Secretary of Housing and Urban Development for Congressional and Intergovernmental Relations; United States Deputy Assistant Secretary of Veterans Affairs, Congressional and Legislative Affairs	
Gloria McPhee	Alpha	first female Cabinet Minister in Bermuda and member of the Bermuda Cabinet	
Juanita Millender-McDonald	Alpha Gamma Omega	former U.S. House of Representatives for California	
Azie Taylor Morton	Beta Kappa	first and only African-American to serve as United States Treasurer	
Lorraine H. Morton	Gamma Lambda	first African-American and longest-serving mayor of Evanston, Illinois	
Hazel O'Leary	Pi	first African-American and first female United States Secretary of Energy; President of Fisk University	
Veronica Owens		Parliament of the Bahamas	
Terri Sewell	Zeta Eta Omega	U.S. House of Representatives from Alabama	
Alisha Thomas Morgan		youngest elected member of the House of Representatives in the U.S. state of Georgia	
Ellen Johnson Sirleaf	Eta Beta Omega	first female president of Liberia	
Tanisha Tynes		Senate of the Bahamas	
Joyce Waddell		Democratic Senator of North Carolina District 40 Mecklenburg County	
Reyna Walters-Morgan		Vice Chair of the Democratic National Committee	
Diane Watson	Alpha Gamma	Democratic Congresswoman of California's 33rd Congressional District	
Frederica Wilson	Pi	Democratic Congresswoman of Florida's 24th Congressional District	

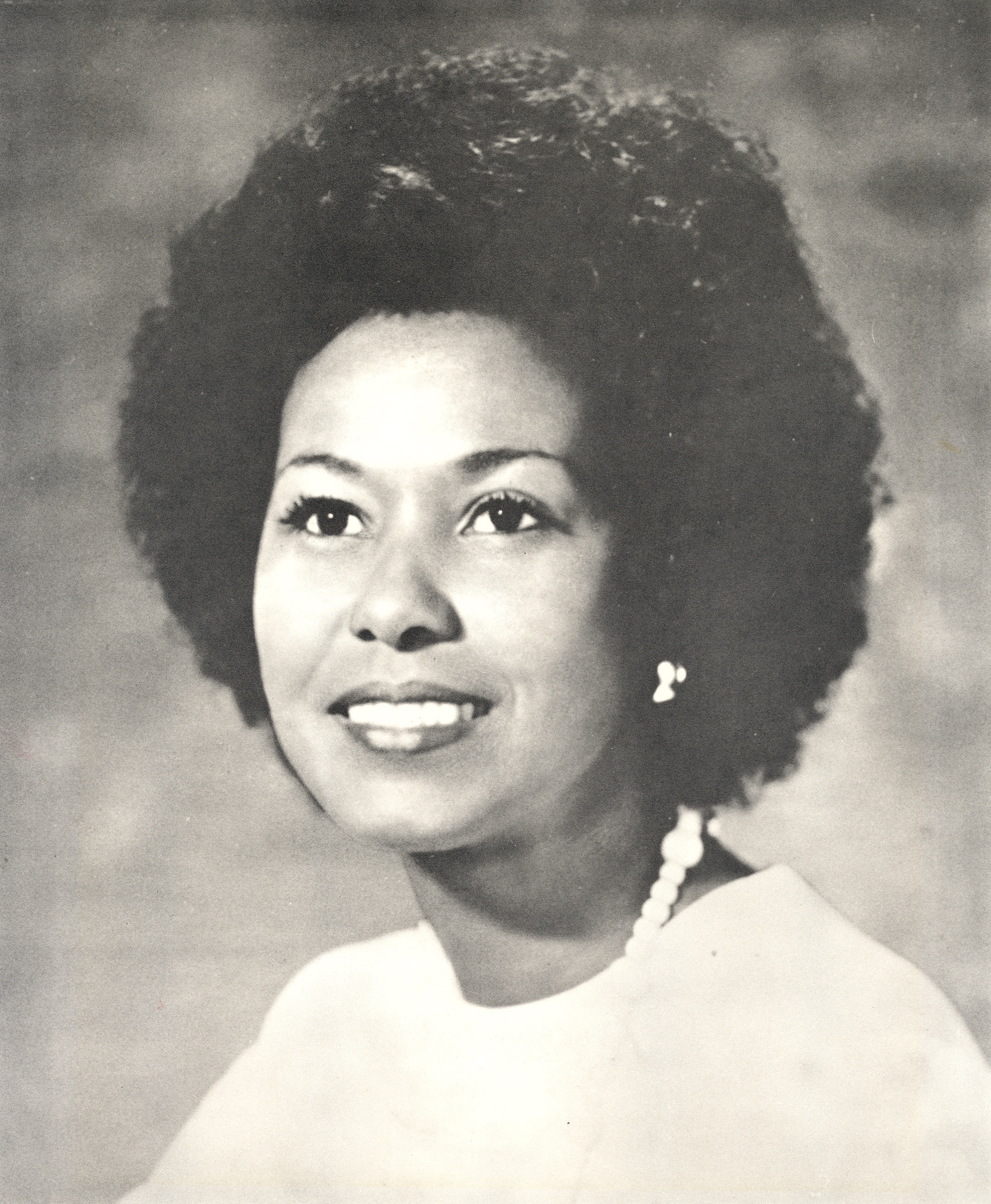
Yvonne Brathwaite Burke

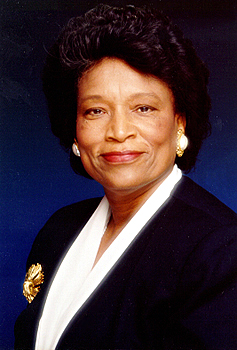
Eva L. Clayton

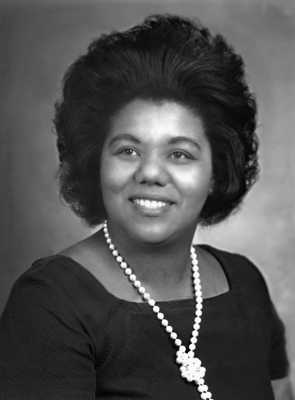
Katie Hall

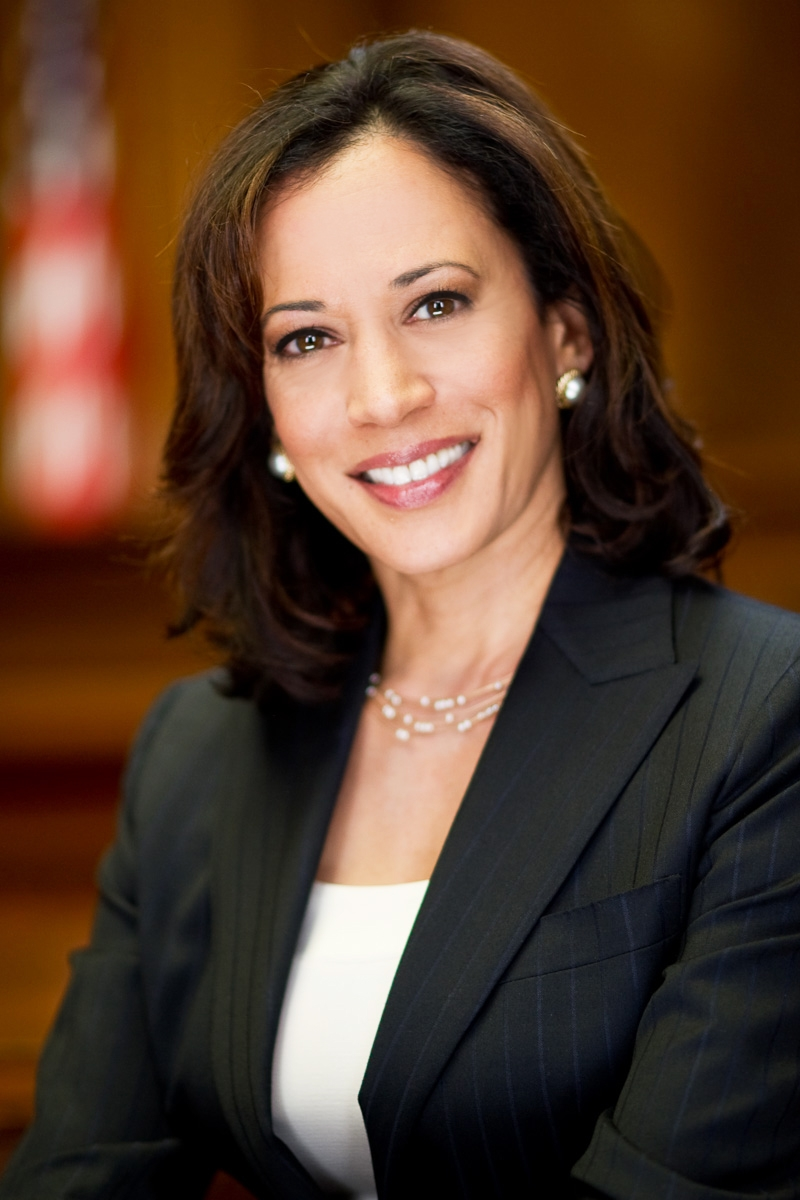
Kamala Harris

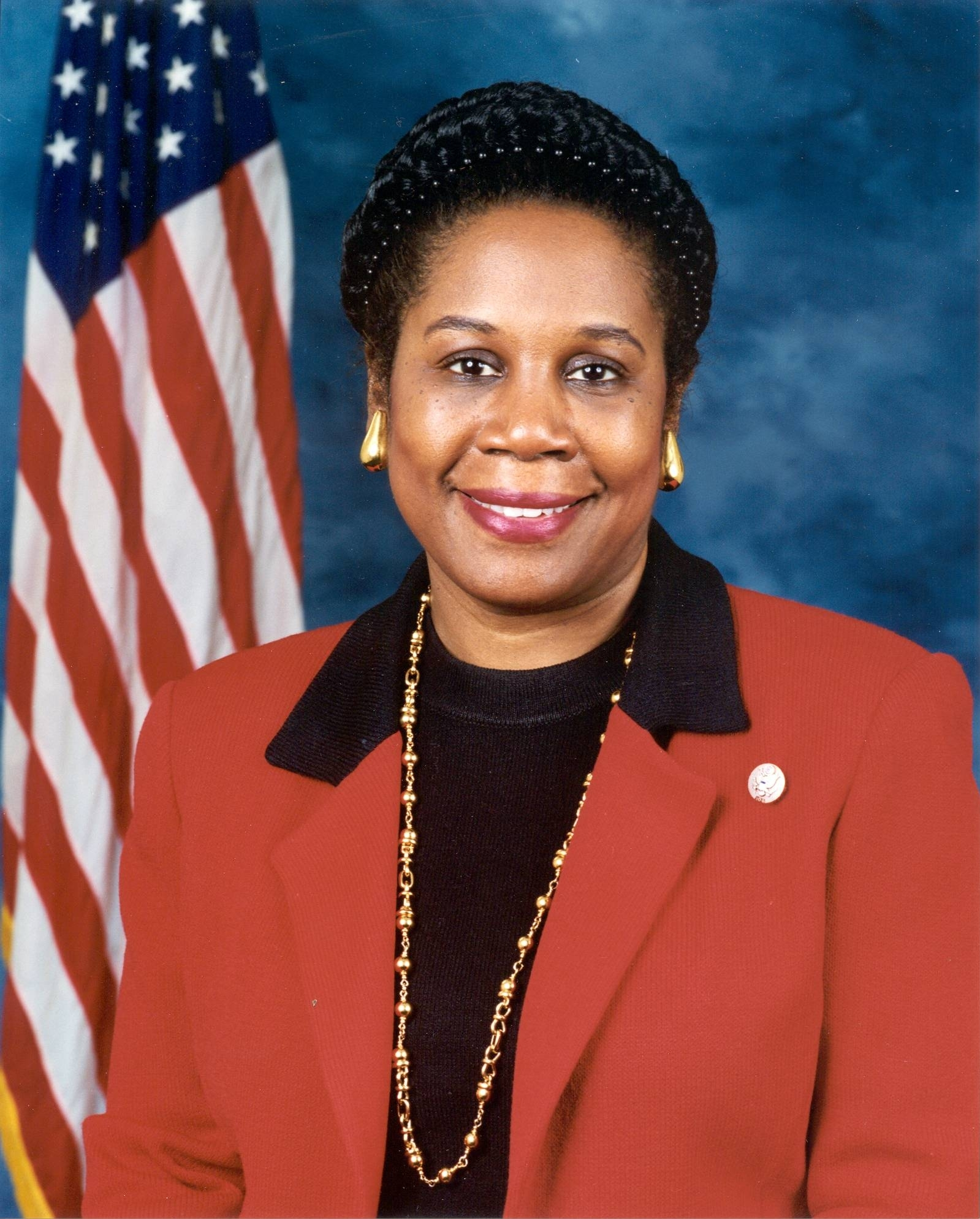
Sheila Jackson-Lee

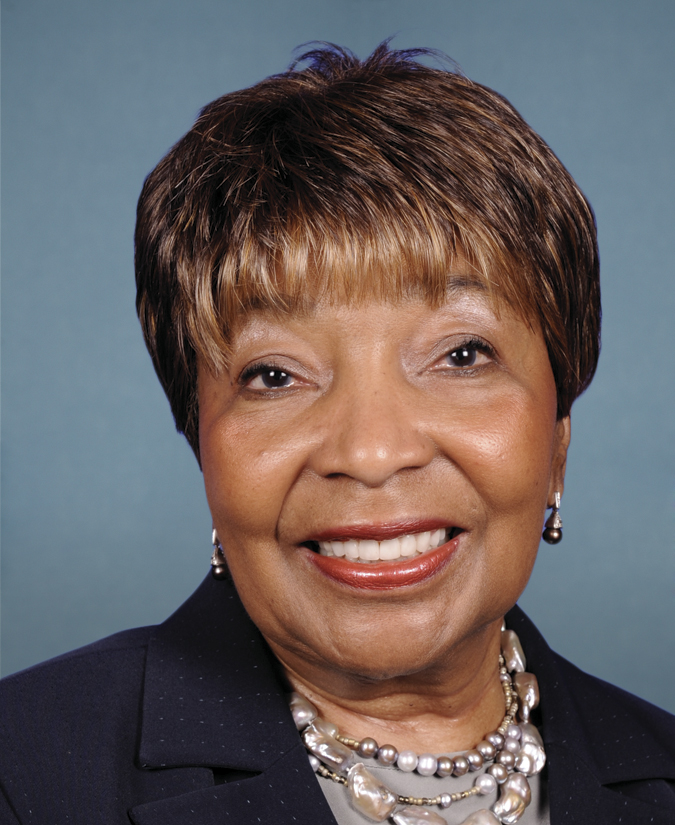
Eddie Bernice Johnson

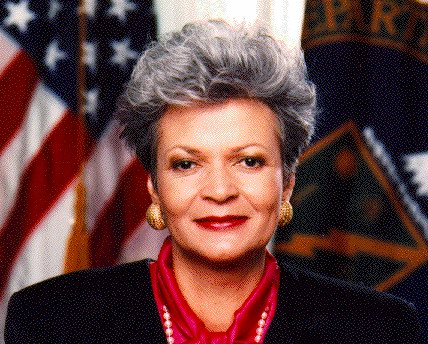
Hazel O'Leary

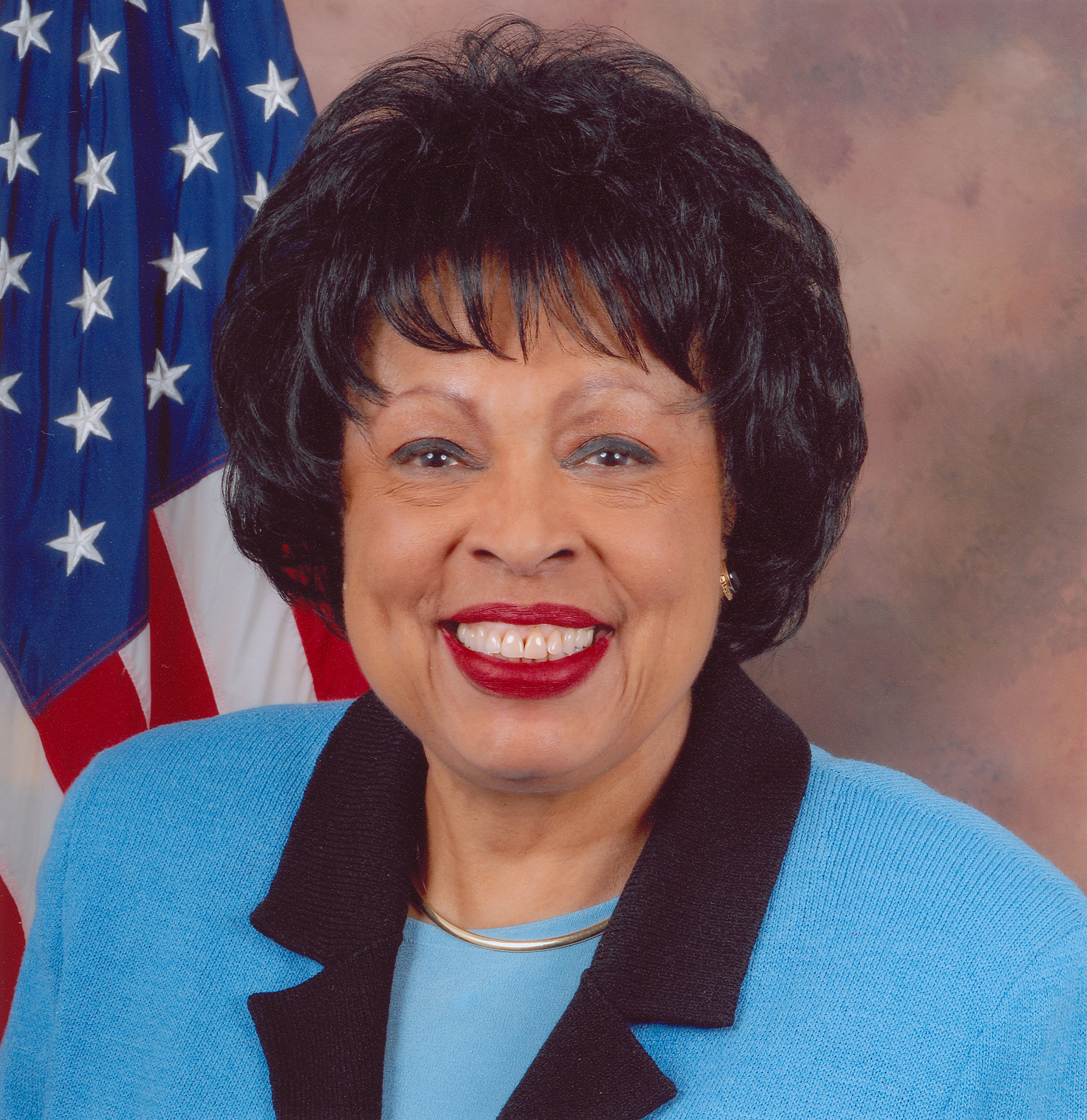
Diane Watson

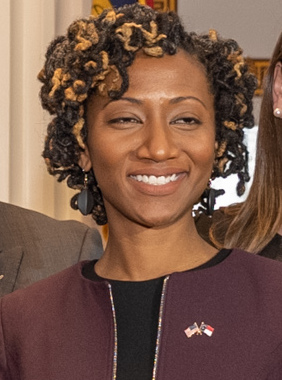
Jocelyn Mitnaul Mallette

== Religion ==
Name / Original chapter / Notability / Ref.; Leontine T. Kelly / Nu / first African-American woman to become a bishop; second woman to become a bishop in the United Methodist Church

== Sports ==
Name	Original chapter	Notability	Ref.
Lisa Borders	Iota Mu	President of WNBA	
Jade Cargill	Omicron Delta	Professional wrestler, World Wrestling Entertainment	
Chryste Gaines	Alpha Xi Omega	US track champion; bronze medal winner, 2000 Olympics	
Althea Gibson	Beta Alpha	first African-American to win a Grand Slam in tennis	
Jolanda "Jo" Jones	Epsilon Lambda	US Track and Field Heptathlon champion; three-time NCAA Heptathlon champion; NCAA Top Six Award winner; Verizon Academic All-America Hall of Fame; Texas Black Sports Hall of Fame; University of Houston Hall of Honor	
Mabel Landry	Beta	member of US track and field team, 1952 Olympics; won several national championships in 50 meters and long jump	
Tiffany Mitchell	Theta Gamma	shooting guard for WNBA's Indiana Fever	
Lucy Diggs Slowe	Alpha	first African-American to win a national championship in any sport (tennis)	
Debi Thomas		first African-American figure skater to win a medal (bronze) in the Winter Olympics	
Morgan Tuck	Lambda Tau	forward for the WNBA's Connecticut Sun	
Marlena Wesh	Lambda Theta	NCAA track-runner, 3-time ACC Champion in the 400, 3-time All-American; 2012 Summer Olympics Semi-finalist in the 400	
Tonique Williams-Darling	Theta Gamma	gold medal Bahamian runner in the 400 meter track at the 2004 Summer Olympics	
A'ja Wilson	Theta Gamma	top 2018 WNBA draft pick by the Las Vegas Aces, 2017 NCAA Champion, 2018 unanimous national player of the year, Wooden Trophy, Naismith and Wooden award, three-time SEC Player of the year	
Corrinne Tarver	Eta Xi	nine-time All-American winner in gymnastics; won NCAA championships in all-around and floor exercise in 1989; member of U.S. National team; Associate Director of Intercollegiate Athletics, Stockton University	

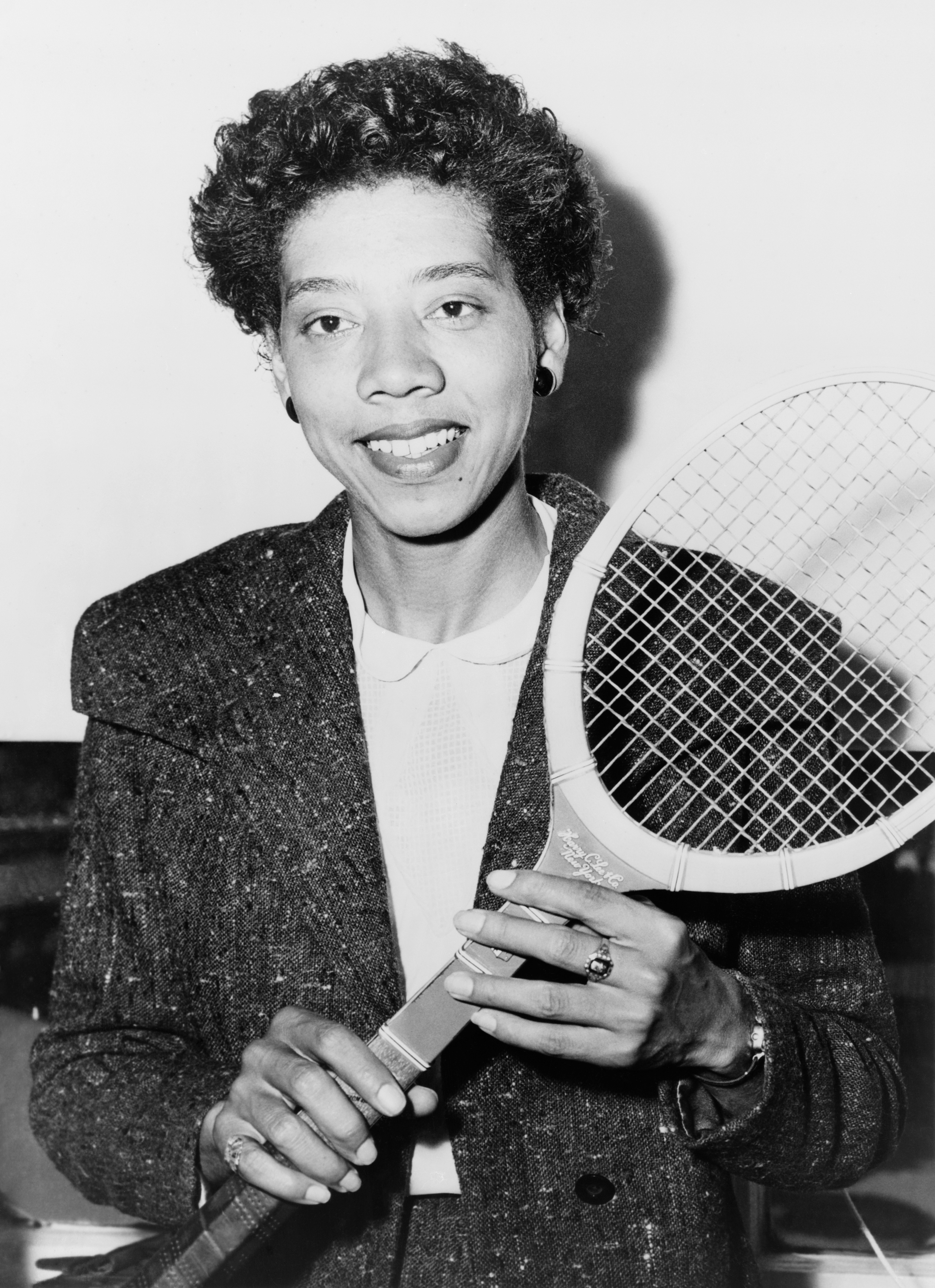
Althea Gibson

== Honorary members ==
Name	Original chapter	Notability	Ref.
Yolanda Adams	Honorary	gospel singer	
Jane Addams	Honorary	founder of Hull House in Chicago; Nobel Peace Prize recipient	
Cecelia Adkins	Honorary	first to lead the Publisher's Association	
Cheryl Albury	Honorary	serves on the Bahamas Supreme Court	
Joyce London Alexander	Honorary	Chief Judge in Massachusetts State Court; United States magistrate judge	
Ethel Alpenfels	Honorary	anthropologist	
Elena Diaz-Verson Amos	Honorary	philanthropist, humanitarian activist, and wife of John Amos	
Lauren Anderson	Honorary	first African-American principal ballerina of a major company (the Houston Ballet)	
Maya Angelou	Honorary	poet, dancer, producer, playwright, film director, and author	
Joan Bernard Armstrong	Honorary	Judge in New Orleans	
Nita Barrow	Honorary	Governor-general from Barbados; Permanent representative to the United Nations	
Mary L. Bell	Honorary	first African American to own and operate a radio station in the city of Detroit; president and chairperson of Bell Broadcasting Corporation	
Gayleatha B. Brown	Honorary	US Ambassador to the Republic of Benin	
Sara Winifred Brown	Honorary	physician and first female alumna trustee of Howard University	
Marilyn Gaston	Honorary	pediatrician and Assistant Surgeon General of the United States	
Dorothy Brunson	Honorary	first African-American woman to own a television station, WGTW-TV	
Rosetta Burke	Honorary	New York State and Army National Guard's Assistant Adjutant General	
Margaret Burroughs	Honorary	founder of DuSable Museum of African American History in Chicago, Illinois	
Margaret Busby	Honorary	first African book publisher in the United Kingdom; writer and broadcaster; inducted into the Most Excellent Order of the British Empire (OBE) by Queen Elizabeth II	
Bebe Moore Campbell	Honorary	author	
Erica Campbell	Honorary	Gospel Singer	
Johnnie Carr	Honorary	civil rights activist	
Emma C. Chappell	Honorary	first African-American woman to form a commercial bank in the US	
Suzette Charles	Honorary	Miss America 1984	
June Jackson Christmas	Honorary	founder of the Harlem Rehabilitation Center in Harlem, New York	
Zoanne Clack	Honorary	writer known for Grey's Anatomy	
Alice Coachman	Honorary	first African-American woman to win an Olympic Gold Medal and first American woman to win a gold medal in track and field during the 1948 Summer Olympics	
Olivia Cole	Honorary	first African-American actress to win an Emmy award	
Cardiss Collins	Honorary	Congresswoman of Illinois' 7th Congressional District, 1973-1997	
Julie Dash	Honorary	filmmaker of Daughters of the Dust	
Belva Davis	Honorary	first African-American news anchor on the West Coast	
Suzanne de Passe	Honorary	only African American to be nominated for an Academy Award for writing; CEO of de Passe Entertainment	
Sadie and Bessie Delany	Honorary	authors and civil rights activists	
Virginia Foster Durr	Honorary	civil rights activist who supported sit-ins and the Freedom Rides	
Ava DuVernay	Honorary	filmmaker known for Selma	
Stephanie Elam	Alpha	CNN Business News correspondent	
Edith Finlayson	Honorary	nurse and civil rights activist	
Ella Fitzgerald	Honorary	jazz singer	
Vonetta Flowers	Honorary	gold medal winner of bobsledding at the 2002 Winter Olympics; first African American (male or female) to win a gold medal in the Winter Olympics	
Meta Vaux Warrick Fuller	Honorary	artist and sculptor	
Bettiann Gardner	Honorary	first African-American woman to be part-owner of a major National Basketball Association team, the Chicago Bulls	
Antoinette Garnes	Honorary	concert performer	
Zina Garrison	Honorary	first African American to win a tennis medal	
Marla Gibbs	Honorary	actress known for 227 and The Jeffersons	
Allyson Maynard Gibson	Honorary	Attorney-General of the Bahamas, barrister, politician, and community rights advocate	
Jan Spivey Gilchrist	Honorary	illustrator	
Elinor Guggenheimer	Honorary	humanitarian and founder of the Women's Forum	
Chamique Holdsclaw	Honorary	top Women's National Basketball Association player	
Maud Cuney Hare	Honorary	pianist and writer	
Hazel Harrison	Honorary	pianist	
Cathy Hughes	Honorary	founder and owner of Radio One	
Jane Edna Hunter	Honorary	nurse who founded Phyllis Wheatley Association & House in Cleveland	
Addie Waites Hunton	Honorary	a founder of the National Association of Colored Women	
Caterina Jarboro	Honorary	opera singer	
Mae Jemison	Honorary	first African-American female astronaut in space	
Margaret Morgan Lawrence	Honorary	child psychiatrist and psychoanalyst	
Virginia Johnson	Honorary	ballerina	
Anne Gamble Kennedy	Pi	concert pianist	
Alicia Keys	Honorary	Grammy Award-winning R&B singer	
Coretta Scott King	Honorary	civil rights leader; wife of Martin Luther King Jr.	
Gladys Knight	Honorary	lead singer of Gladys Knight and the Pips; Grammy Award-winning gospel and R&B artist	
Patti LaBelle	Honorary	singer and songwriter	
Bertina E. Lampkin	Honorary	judge on the Illinois First District Appellate Court	
Carmen De Lavallade	Honorary	dancer and choreographer; wife of Geoffrey Holder	
Cleo Parker Robinson	Honorary	artistic director of Cleo Parker Robinson Dance Theater	
Suzanne Malveaux	Honorary	news anchor on CNN and TVOne contributor	
Wangari Muta Maathai	Honorary	first African woman to receive Nobel Peace Prize	
Julia Cooper Mack	Honorary	Senior judge of District of Columbia's Court of Appeals	
Jewell Jackson McCabe	Honorary	founder of the National Coalition of 100 Black Women	
Enolia McMillan	Honorary	first female national president of NAACP	
Michelle Morial	Honorary	journalist	
Jessie Bryant Mosley	Honorary	founder of the Smith Robertson Museum & Cultural Center	
Constance Baker Motley	Honorary	African-American civil rights activist, judge, and state senator	
Nichelle Nichols	Honorary	actress known for Star Trek	
Jessye Norman	Honorary	opera singer	
Brandy Norwood	Honorary	Grammy Award-winning singer, and actress	
Edith Mai Padmore	Honorary	cabinet member from Liberia	
Vijaya Lakshmi Pandit	Honorary	first female President of the United Nations General Assembly and Indian diplomat	
Delores Parker	Honorary	actress, pianist, and soloist	
Lillian Rogers Parks	Honorary	author of My Thirty Years Backstairs at the White House; White House maid and seamstress	
Rosa Parks	Honorary	civil rights leader; catalyst for the Montgomery bus boycott	
Mary E. Peabody	Honorary	activist in civil and human rights	
Jo Marie Payton	Honorary	actress known for Family Matters	
Ernesta Procope	Honorary	president of E. G. Bowman Company, Incorporated	
M. Athalie Range	Honorary	first African American to serve on Miami City Commission and Florida's Department of Community Affairs	
Cleo Parker Robinson	Honorary	dancer and artistic director of Cleo Parker Robinson Dance Theater	
Eleanor Roosevelt	Honorary	First Lady of the United States and humanitarian	
Ntozake Shange	Honorary	playwright and performance artist known for For Colored Girls Who Have Considered Suicide When the Rainbow Is Enuf	
Ruth Simmons	Honorary	1st African American to helm one of the Seven Sisters colleges	
Sheila Sisulu	Honorary	South African ambassador to the US	
Jada Pinkett Smith	Honorary	actress and singer	
Edith Ssempala	Honorary	US Ambassador from Uganda	
Alma G. Stallworth	Honorary	Michigan House of Representatives	
C. Vivian Stringer	Honorary	Rutgers University head basketball coach	
Tika Sumpter	Honorary	actress known for One Life to Live and The Haves and the Have Nots)	
Lou Nelle Sutton	Honorary	Texas House of Representatives	
Marietta Tree	Honorary	first female U.S. ambassador to the United Nations; founder of Sydenham Hospital, Harlem, the first interracial hospital in the US	
C. Delores Tucker	Honorary	civil rights activist; first African-American Pennsylvania Secretary of State	
Debbye Turner	Honorary	Miss America 1990; veterinarian	
Leah Tutu	Honorary	wife of South African Archbishop Desmond Tutu	
Jessie Vann	Honorary	publisher of Pittsburgh Courier	
Iyanla Vanzant	Honorary	author and attorney	
Alice Walker	Honorary	winner of the Pulitzer Prize for Fiction	
Laura Wheeler Waring	Honorary	artist, painter, and writer	
Lynn Whitfield	Honorary	Emmy Award-winning actress	
Carol H. Williams	Honorary	founder of the Carol H. Williams Advertising Agency	
Jane C. Wright	Honorary	surgeon and cancer researcher	

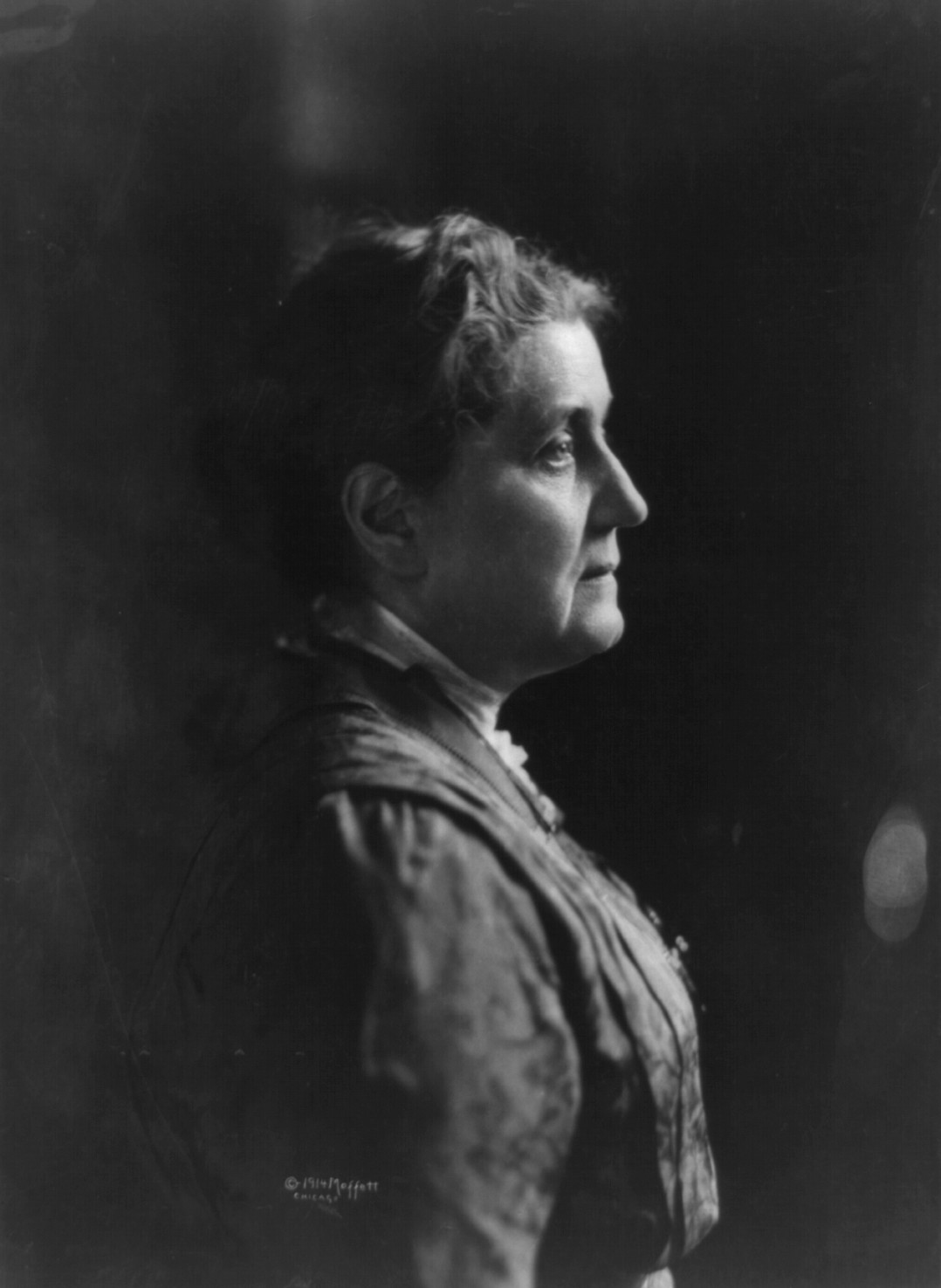
Jane Addams

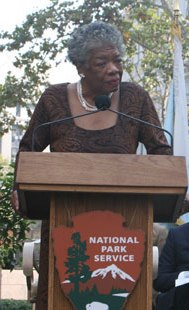
Maya Angelou

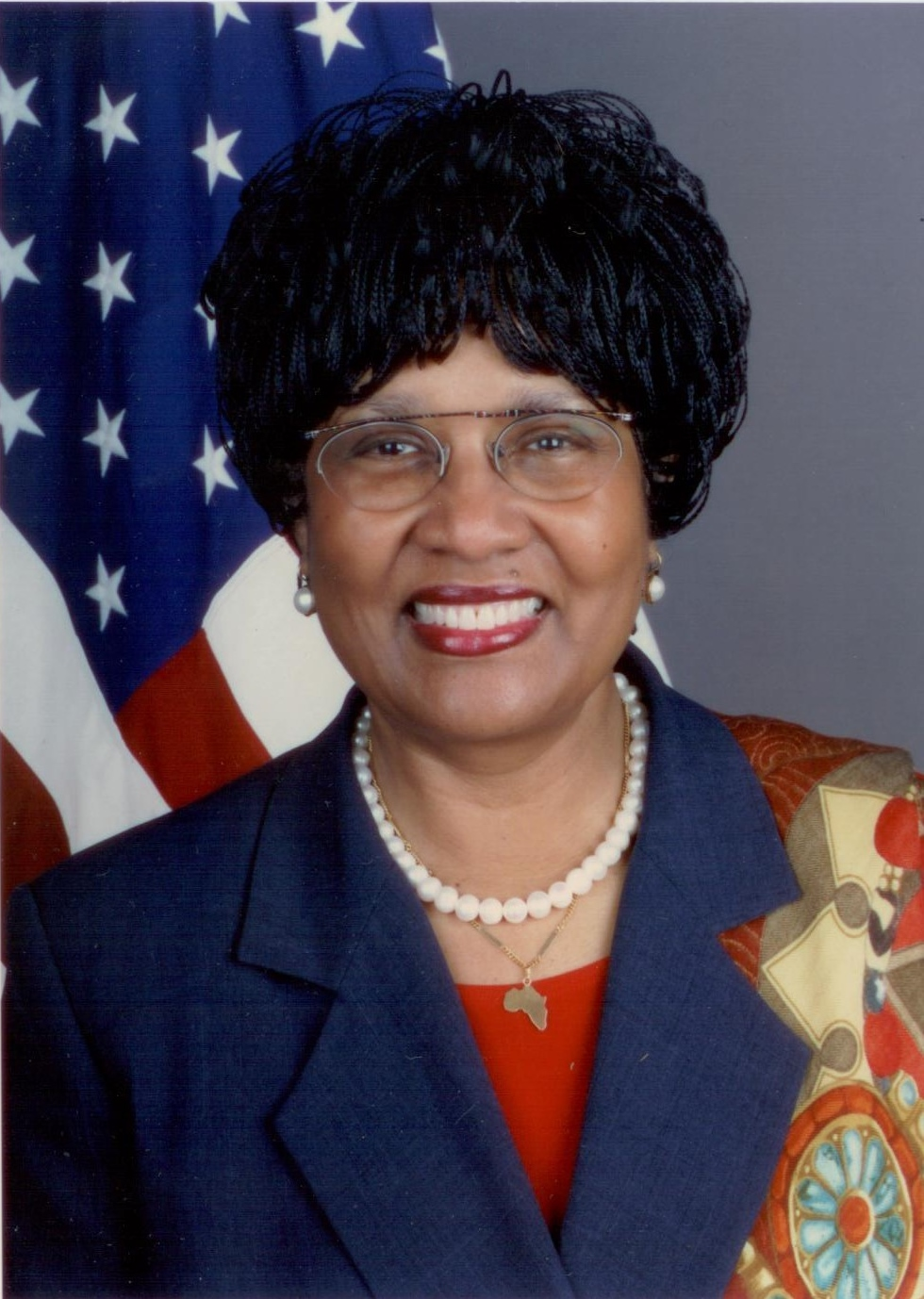
Gayleatha Brown

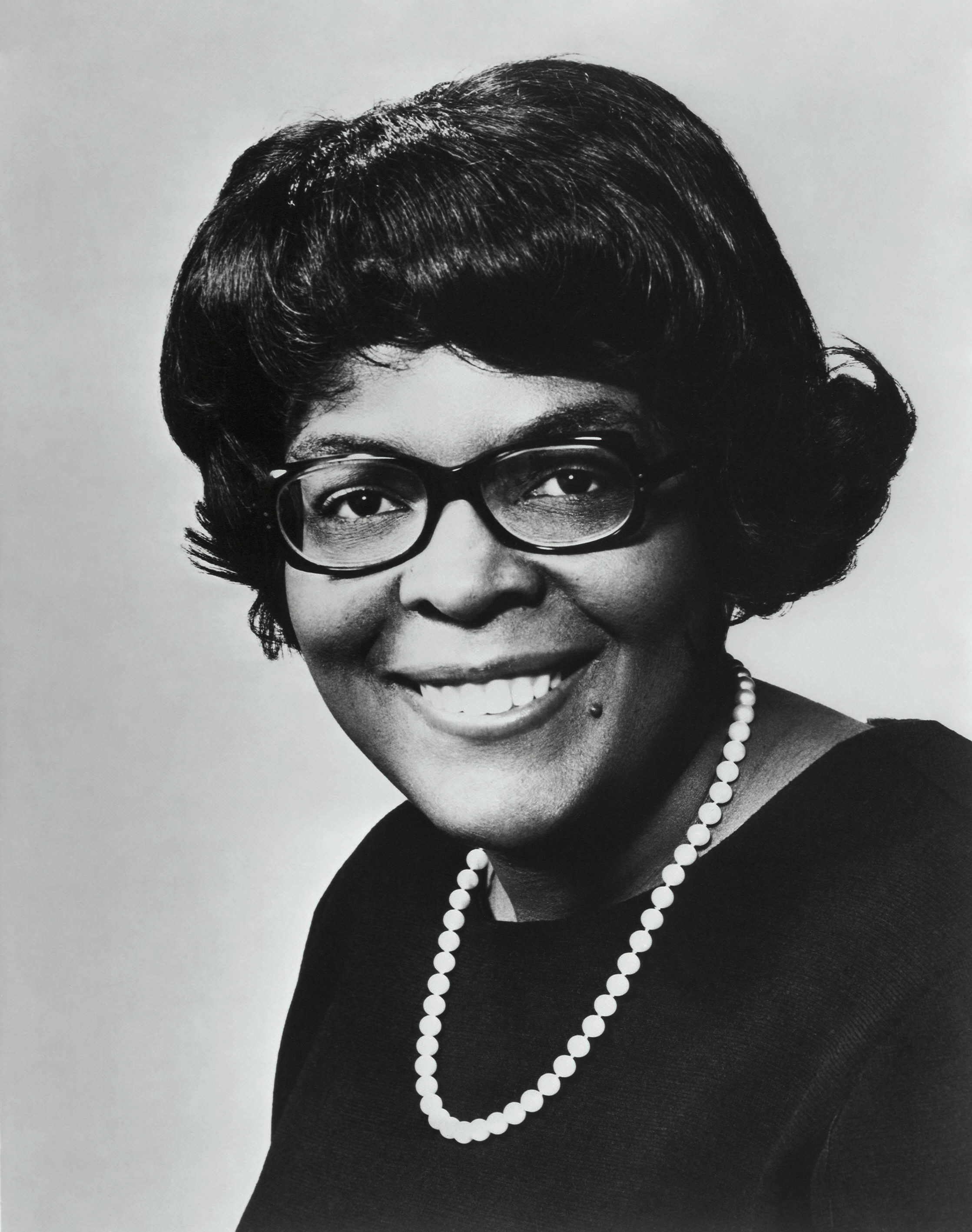
Cardiss Collins

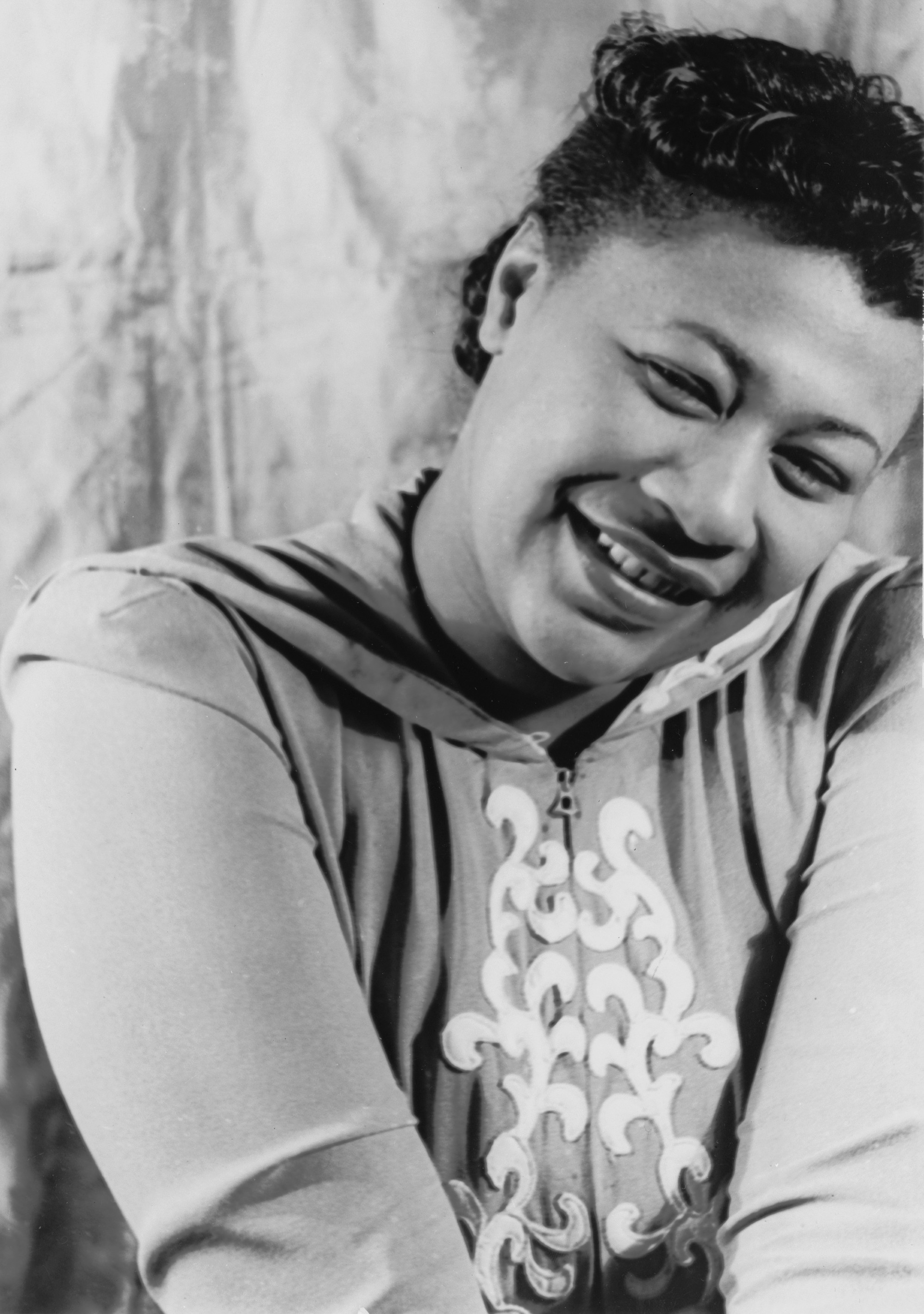
Ella Fitzgerald

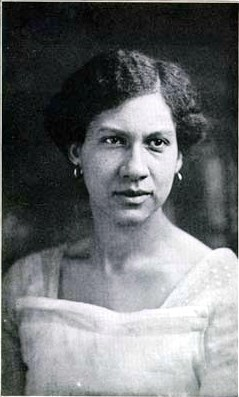
Meta Vaux Warrick Fuller

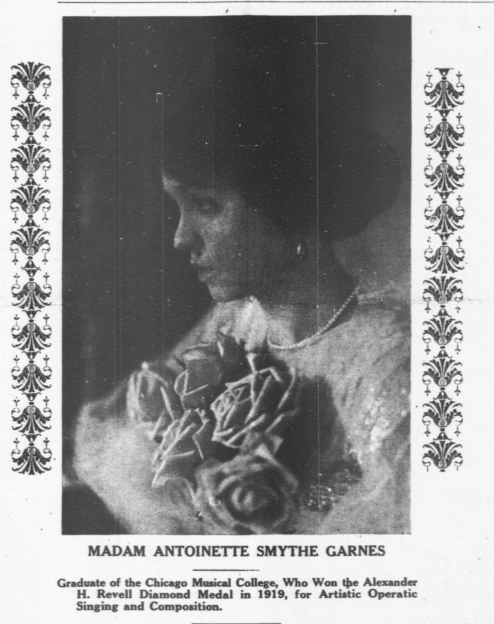
Antoinette Garnes

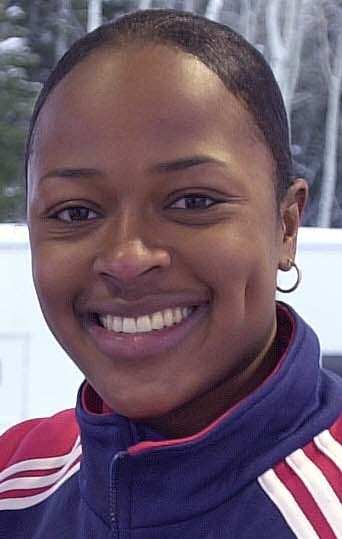
Vonetta Flowers

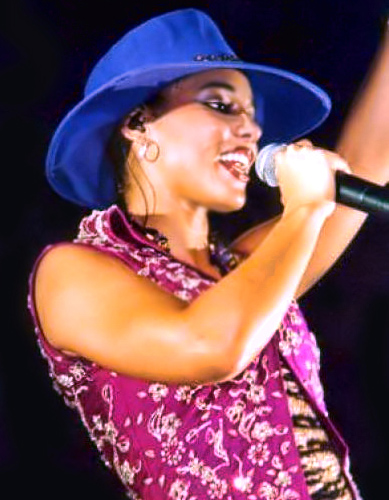
Alicia Keys

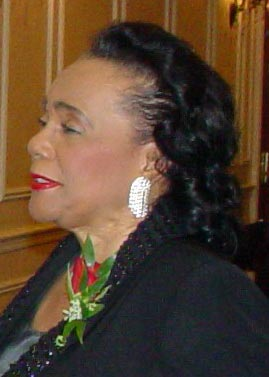
Coretta Scott King

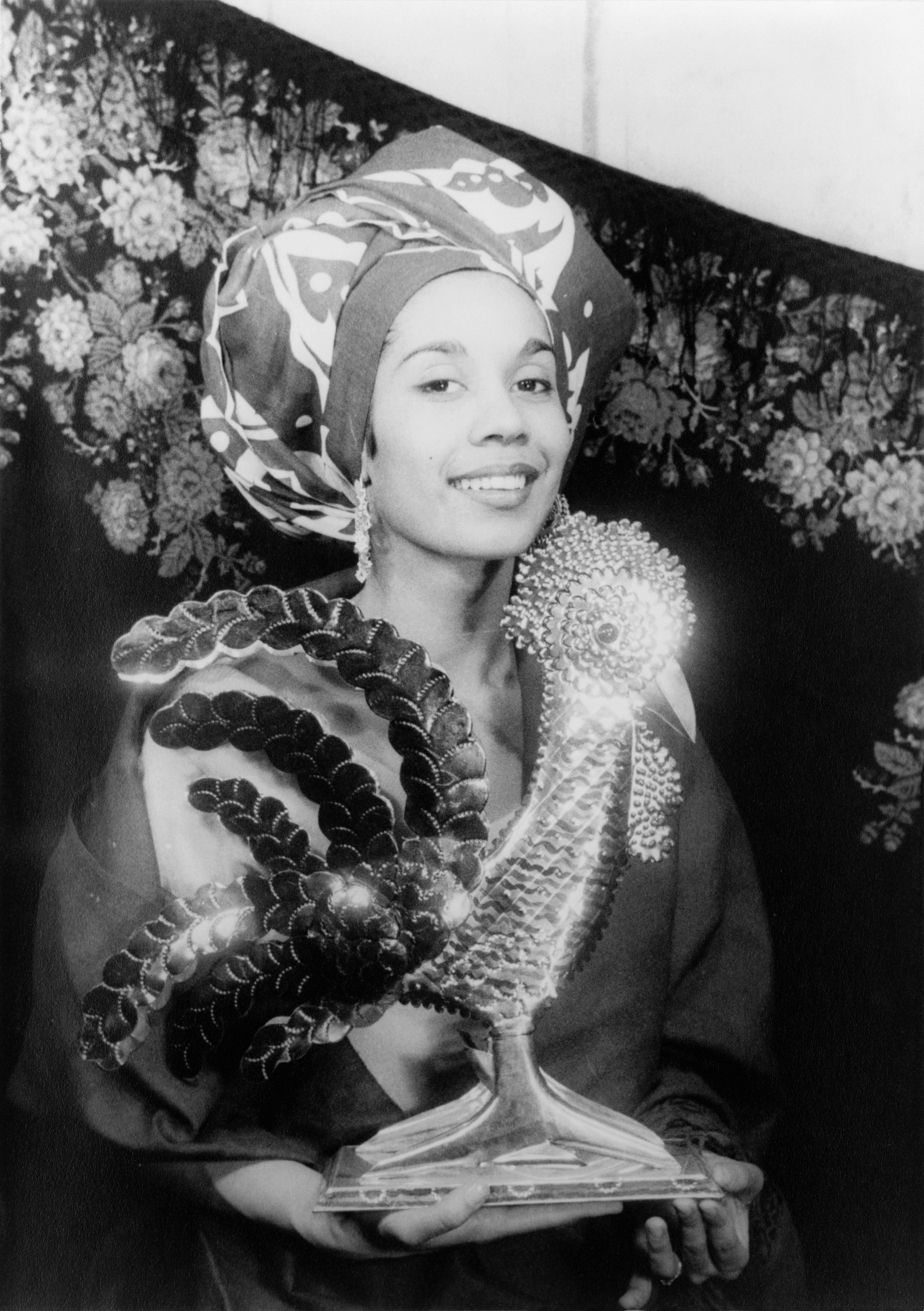
Carmen de Lavallade-Holder

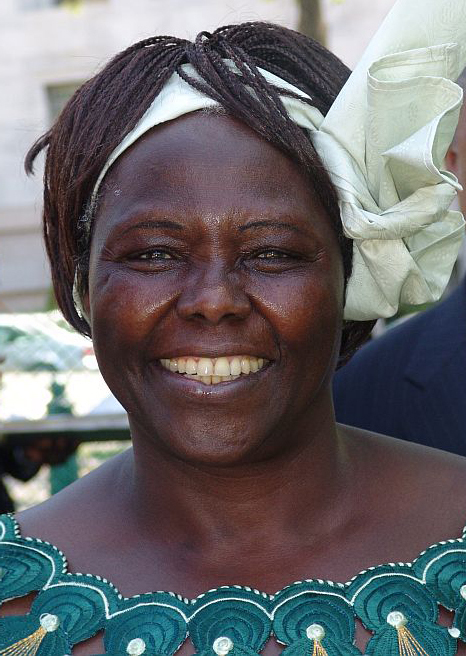
Wangari Maathai

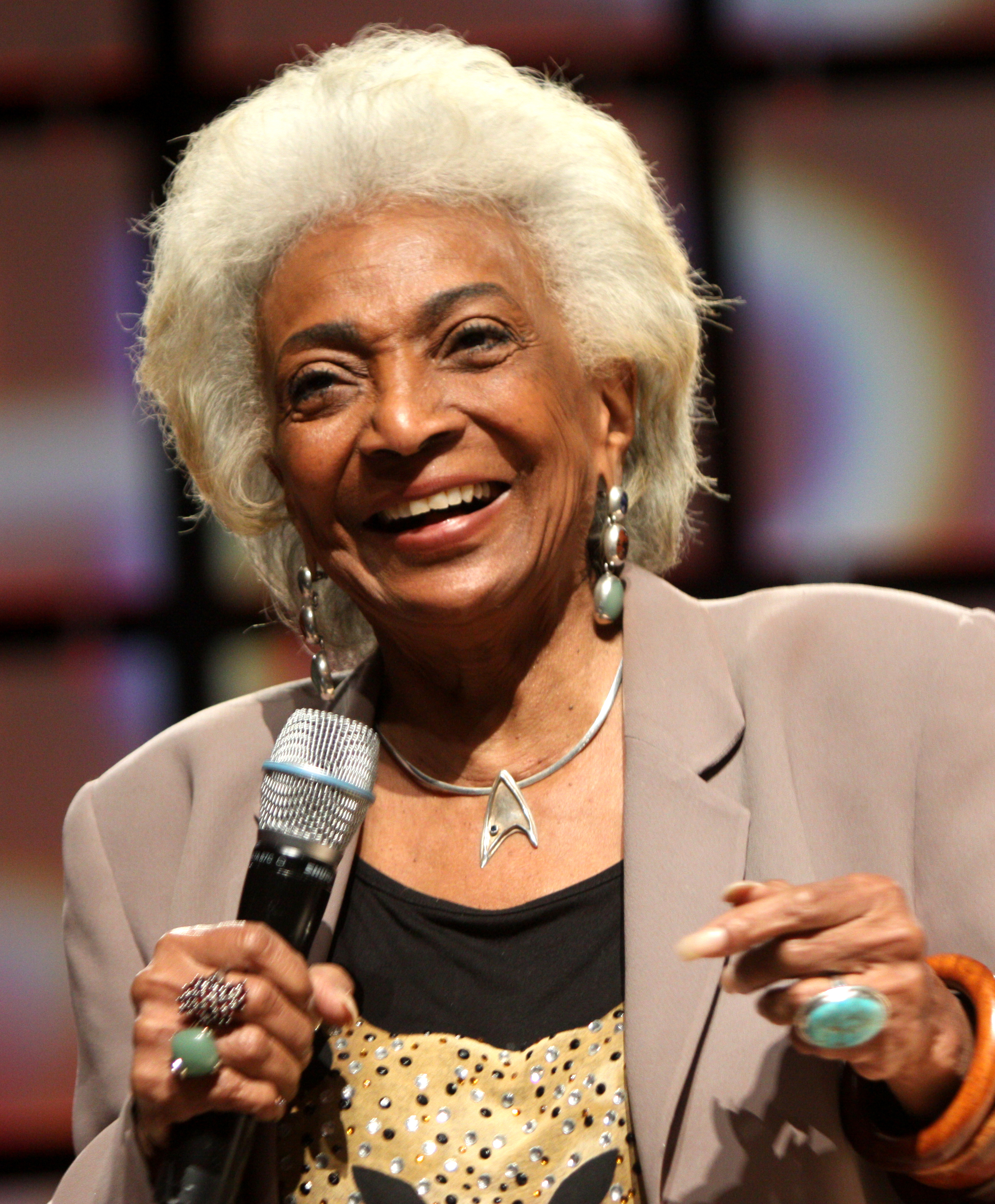
Nichelle Nichols

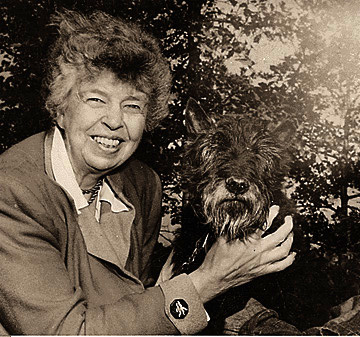
Eleanor Roosevelt

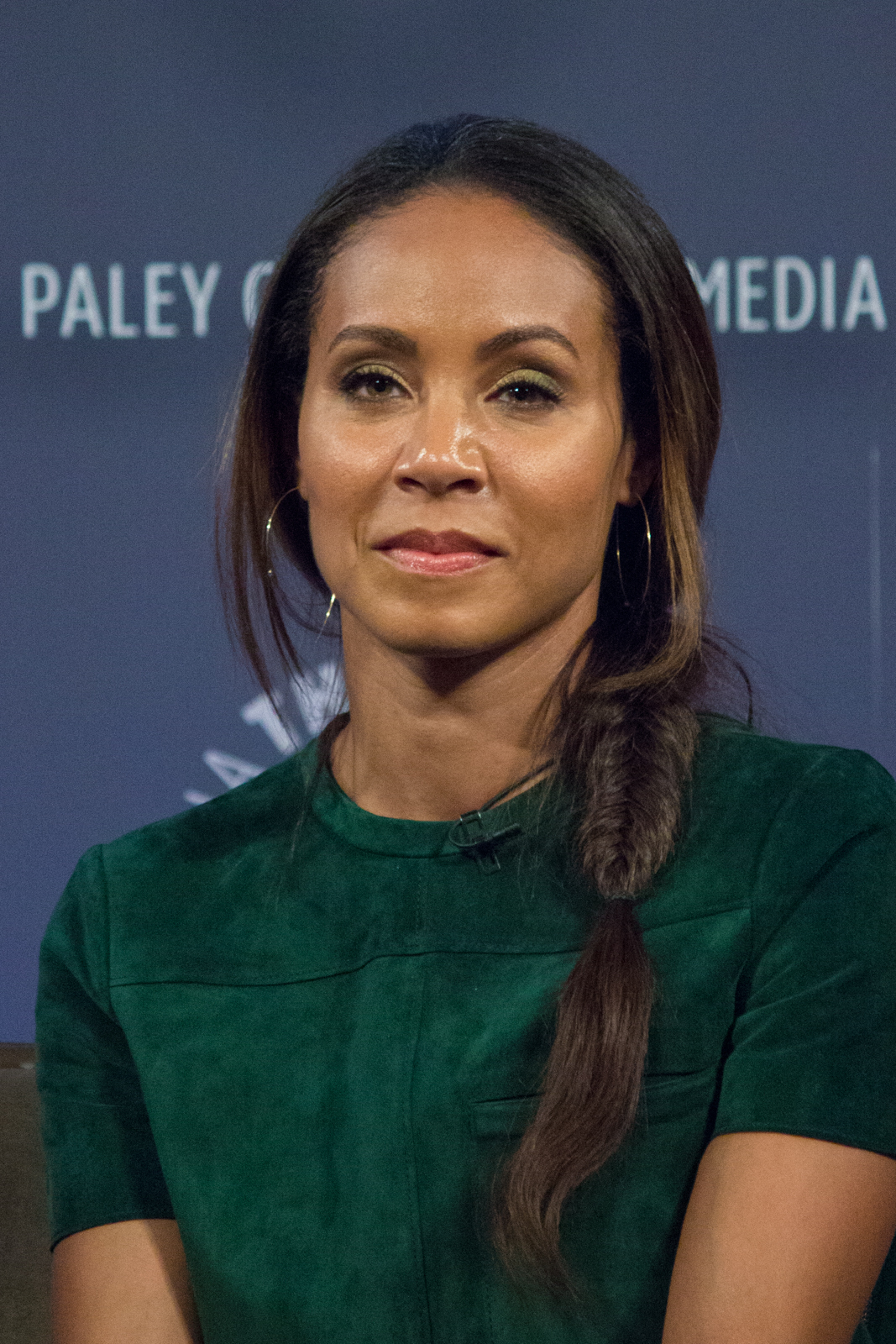
Jada Pinkett Smith

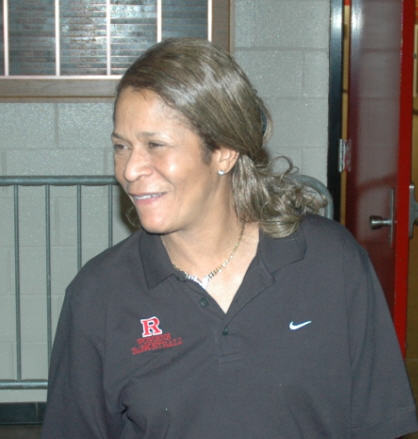
C. Vivian Stringer

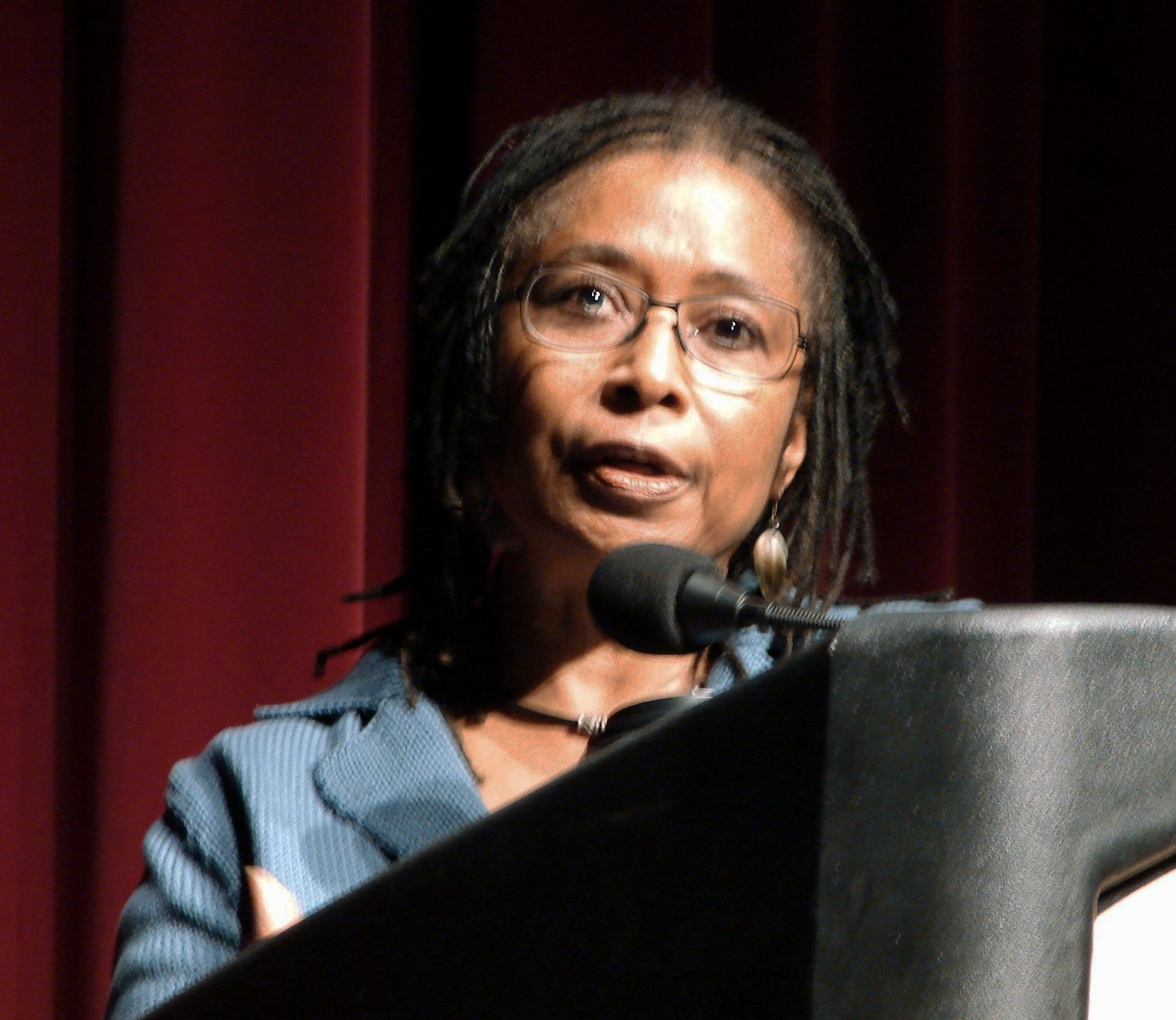
Alice Walker
