= Fashion for a Cure =

Charity

Fashion for a cure is a charity that aims to raise awareness of breast cancer, and to raise funds to research the cure or prevention of breast cancer.

The organization encourages local groups to host fashion shows where all the models are cancer survivors. JaQuitta Williams, a newscaster in Atlanta, appeared at a Fashion for a cure event and sang the Destiny's Child song "Survivor" after taking an 18-month leave of absence to beat her own cancer.
