= Alika Hope =

American vocalist (born 1975)

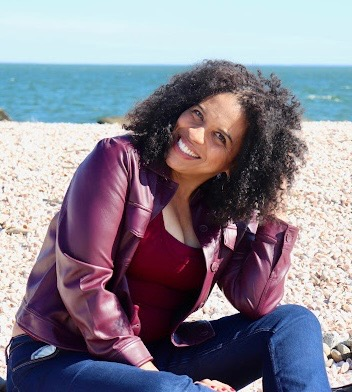
- Alika Hope

Background information
- Born: June 1, 1975 (age 51)
- Website: Ray of Hope Project

Alika Hope is the founder and primary vocalist for the Ray of Hope Project. She was born in Oregon and received a Bachelor of Arts in sociology from the University of Notre Dame. Hope also minored in dance at St. Mary's College. She went on to receive a Master of Arts in early childhood special education from Teachers College at Columbia University. She is currently an Arts Administration professor at Wagner College

== Career ==
=== Opera career ===
In 2003, Hope was the soloist singing "Ave Maria" National Shrine of The Divine Mercy on Divine Mercy Sunday. This performance was broadcast internationally on EWTN.

In conjunction with Baritone Fredrick Redd of the New York City Opera and Lincoln Center, Hope performed in a one-night-only concert of "Spoken and Sung: The African-American Spiritual" at King's College (Pennsylvania) in Wilkes-Barre, Pennsylvania to promote and raise awareness of Black History Month

=== Theatre and singing ===
Hope is a member of Actors Equity Association and was in a production of South Pacific in the 2000s. In 2012, she performed on The Island Lily as Junie. She has also portrayed Mrs. Muller in "Doubt" with Berkshire Actors Theatre. Her singing events can be found on BroadwayWorld. She participated in a Human Rights Festival in 2018 and an Arts Festival for Human Rights in New York in 2017.

=== Television ===
Hope has been host of New England Perspective TV on FOX-61 and Boston's Channel 7 since 2013. She stars as Sandra in the comedy A Coupla Pros.

=== Academic career ===
In 2002, Hope joined the faculty of King's College (Pennsylvania) as Director of The Center of Community and Service Learning and Associate Campus Minister until the mid 2000s. Her position as Director allowed her the ability to support students, staff, and faculty with incorporating volunteering and service leaning into daily life and coursework. In 2022, Hope joined as Visiting Assistant Professor in the Department of Performing Arts at Wagner College teaching Arts Administration, and later became a full-time Clinical Professor in 2025.

=== Pageants ===
Hope was the first-ever African American woman to be crowned Ms. New England America for the 2019 Ms. America Pageant.

=== Ray of Hope Project ===
Hope is the co-founder and president of The Ray of Hope Project, an organization with the goal of using African American spirituals to shed light on the combined anti-slavery efforts of blacks and whites in 19th century New England. The project includes nine musicians and actors who incorporate African American spirituals with live music in their participatory programs.

The Ray of Hope Project musicians and actors use historical records of successful African Americans to teach about slavery in America in the 1900s. Collaborations with schools, libraries and museums throughout the United States has allowed members to create poems and performance material. The project also uses the music and lyrics of 20th century social justice songs as a way of creating conversations around current issues of global social justice issues.

"Hope for a Motherless Child", the project's first album, was released in 2016 and won a "preferred choice" award for Kids CD in the 2016 Creative Child Magazine awards. It was also awarded a Global Music Award in June 2016.

In June, 2016, Hope and the Ray of Hope project participated in Old Sturbridge Village's Juneteenth/Freedom Week. She was interviewed by Connecticut Public Radio about the experience.

In an interview with Lioness magazine, Hope said that the motto of Ray of Hope Project is to "Feel the Music, Change the World"

In 2017, Ray of Hope created a music video "IRL" which focuses on the importance of exhibiting kindness in social media.
