= Ethel Alpenfels =

American anthropologist

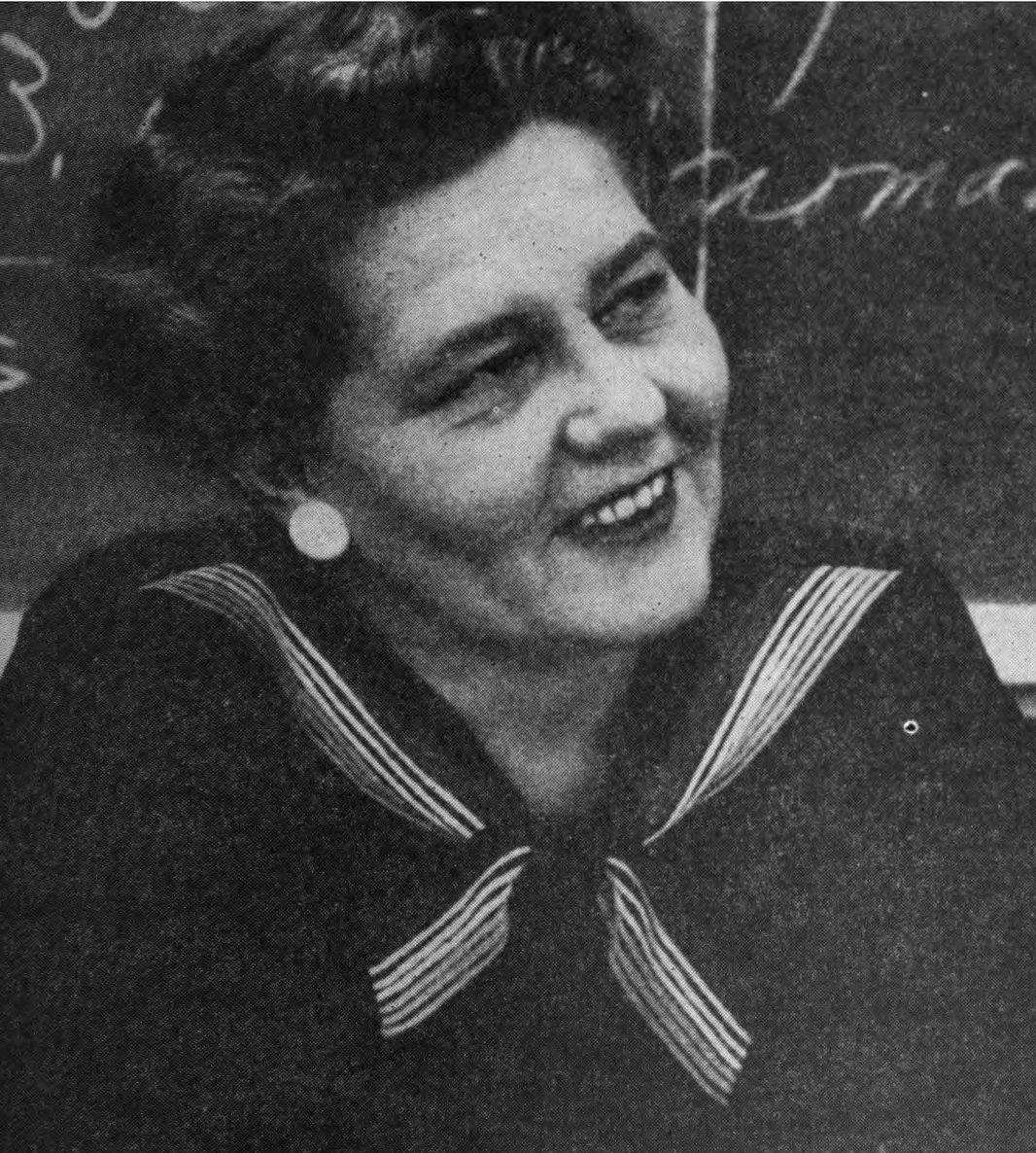
Ethel Alpenfels in 1962

Ethel Josephine Alpenfels (1907–1981) was an American anthropologist who served as professor of anthropology at New York University.

Born to a German baron, Alpenfels graduated from the University of Washington and received her Ph.D. from the University of Chicago. In her studies as part of the Bureau for Intercultural Education in 1944, she went to high schools in Chicago and educated students on differences and cultures, explaining that people considered "simple" have complex cultures.

In 1946 she authored a short book entitled Sense and Nonsense About Race for young people attempting to dispel myths about racial differences and racial superiority. This book remained in print through 1967. She was a member of Alpha Kappa Alpha sorority.
