= Sheila Sisulu =

Personal details
- Born: April 12, 1948 (age 78)

Sheila Violet Makate Sisulu (née Mashile; born April 12, 1948, in Johannesburg) is a South African civil rights activist and former diplomat. Since 2003, she has been working for the United Nations World Food Programme (WFP).

== Early years and anti-apartheid activism ==
Sheila Sisulu grew up in Soweto, where her parents ran a shop. During her childhood, the apartheid system was being increasingly entrenched through legislation in South Africa. In 1955, a segregated education system was implemented across the country. Shortly after Sisulu started school, her older brother, an anti-apartheid activist, warned their parents that soldiers and police would raid the township. As a result, her parents kept her at home. The police ordered that all students who missed school that day would not be allowed to return. It took six months before she was permitted to re-enroll.

At the age of twelve, Sisulu was harassed by a teacher, prompting her parents to send her to a girls' boarding school in Swaziland. There, she received a solid education based on the British system. When she returned to South Africa during summer vacations, she felt the impact of apartheid even more acutely. On her 16th birthday, she received a pass book, which all Black South Africans were required to carry for identification purposes. She later recalled that “… to have it was to identify me as a second-class citizen in the country of my birth.”

Determined to pursue a career and fight against apartheid, she obtained a bachelor's degree in language and philosophy from the National University of Lesotho in 1974. She returned to South Africa and took various jobs, none of which she found fulfilling. In the mid-1970s, she married Mlungsi Sisulu, the son of Albertina and Walter Sisulu, both prominent human rights activists and members of the African National Congress (ANC), closely associated with Nelson Mandela. Walter Sisulu spent 25 years imprisoned on Robben Island alongside Mandela, while Albertina Sisulu was under house arrest. Since she could not leave her home, Sheila and Mlungsi's wedding took place in a tent across the street, allowing Albertina to witness the ceremony. The couple had three children.

In 1974, Sisulu began working as a teacher for the South African Committee for Higher Education (SACHED), a non-governmental organization (NGO) that supported Black students who sought alternatives to the substandard public schools designated for them. In 1976, the South African government mandated that schools teach in Afrikaans, a language many Black South Africans did not speak fluently. This policy sparked the Soweto uprising and other protests in Black townships. In response, Sisulu offered courses to help Black students pass the exams necessary for their high school diploma, allowing them access to higher education. Every student who attended her course passed their exams. She also developed a distance learning program for rural students and launched an educational magazine.

From 1988 to 1991, Sheila Sisulu worked for the South African Council of Churches (SACC), which openly opposed apartheid and raised international awareness of the discrimination suffered by Black South Africans. Next, she led the Joint Enrichment Project, which aimed to prepare young Black South Africans for the post-apartheid era. To further her work, she obtained a second bachelor's degree in education from the University of the Witwatersrand, traveled for four weeks to the United States to study schools there, and in collaboration with the Community Agency for Social Enquiry, commissioned a study on the disadvantages faced by black youth in South Africa. The findings were published in 1993 as Youth, Education and Work.

== End of apartheid and new career paths ==
The 1994 first free elections for all South Africans marked the official end of apartheid. In an interview with Ebony, Sisulu said that she recalled the day as a bride recalls her wedding. From 1994 to 1997, she served as an advisor to the Minister of Education. In 1997, she was appointed South Africa’s Consul General in Washington, D.C., tasked with attracting foreign investors to South Africa. Two years later, she became Ambassador to the United States, becoming South Africa’s first Black ambassador to the U.S.

From 2003, Sisulu served as the World Food Programme's Deputy Director for Policy and External Affairs. In 2008, she became Deputy Director for Hunger Solutions.

== Awards ==
In 1993, Sisulu received the Nedbank Femina Award, followed by the South African Women for Women Education Award in 1998. She was awarded honorary doctorates from the University of Maryland, College Park and the City University of New York. In April 2017, Rhodes University also granted her an honorary doctorate in recognition of her efforts in promoting food security for vulnerable communities worldwide.

== Personal life ==
Her husband, Mlungisi Sisulu, worked for the ANC in Orlando West, Soweto, after 1994 and ran a retail business there until his death. He died from cancer on October 13, 2015 in Johannesburg. She has a son, Linda, and two daughters, Boitumelo and Ntsiki - Nontsikilelo Sisulu-Singapi, a board member of the Centre for the Study of Violence and Reconciliation.
