= Depelsha Thomas McGruder =

American businessperson and broadcast journalist

- Born: Atlanta, Georgia
- Education: Howard University (BA); Harvard Business School (MBA)
- Occupation: Chief operating officer
- Employer: Ford Foundation
- Known for: Founder of Moms of Black Boys (MOBB) United

Depelsha Thomas McGruder is the vice president, chief operating officer, and treasurer of the Ford Foundation. She is also the founder of Moms of Black Boys (MOBB) United, a non-profit organization advocating for Black boys and young men as well as increased accountability for law enforcement.

== Early life and education ==
McGruder was born in Atlanta, Georgia. She earned her BA in broadcast journalism from Howard University in 1994 followed by her MBA from Harvard Business School in 1998.

== Career ==
McGruder worked at MTV as a senior director for business development. In 2006, she was promoted to senior vice president of business operations and strategy for MTV, where she was responsible for strategy, growth planning, and operational improvements. She also worked as an executive for Black Entertainment Television. McGruder attributes her career success to a specific strategy of "climbing the ranks by working in a range of corporate functions", keeping focus on whether each assignment helps her on achieving specific career goals.

In 2016, after the police killings of Alton Sterling and Philando Castile, McGruder started the Facebook group "Moms of Black Boys United" (MOBB). Within a month, the group had grown to over 117,000 members. McGruder ascribes the growth of MOBB to the "urgent need for discussion around the topic of police brutality and the fact that many mothers share the same fears, concerns, frustrations, anger and anxiety surrounding the issue." Based on its success, MOBB evolved into two non-profit organizations: Moms of Black Boys United, a 501(c)(3) focused on raising support and changing perceptions, and MOBB United for Social Change, a 501(c)(4) that seeks to influence policy "around how Black men and young men are treated and perceived by law enforcement and society at the local, state, and federal levels".

In 2018, McGruder became chief operating officer of New York Public Radio. In 2020, McGruder joined the Ford Foundation as its chief operating officer and treasurer, overseeing finance and global operations for the $13 billion foundation.

== Awards and honors ==
- In 2011, McGruder received The Network Journal's 40-Under-Forty Achievement Award
- In 2020, McGruder was named one of the 25 Influential Black Women in Business by The Network Journal
- In 2021, McGruder was listed as one of the BBC 100 Women of the Year
- In 2023, McGruder was the recipient of Harvard Business School's Alumni Achievement Award, an honor given to alumni who exemplify the mission and values of the Harvard Business School
