= Valerie Brathwaite Nelson =

American politician

Justice of the New York Supreme Court
- Incumbent
- Assumed office 2005

Personal details
- Born: Queens, New York, U.S.
- Political party: Democratic
- Spouse(s): Nicholas J. Nelson, Ph.D.
- Children: 3
- Education: Syracuse University (BS), George Washington University (JD)

Valerie Brathwaite Nelson is an American attorney, politician, and jurist from New York who is serving on the Second Department of the New York Supreme Court Appellate Division (2016 - present) and the New York Supreme Court 11th Judicial District (2005 - present).

== Early life and education ==
Brathwaite Nelson grew up in Queens and attended P.S. 134, Renaissance Middle School, and Campus Magnet High School. She received a B.A from Syracuse University in Political Science where she graduated with honors in three years. Later, she earned a J.D. from George Washington University.

== Career ==
After receiving her J.D., Brathwaite Nelson worked as a law clerk for U.S. Congresswoman Shirley Chisholm. She also worked as an attorney for the National Labor Relations Board and the New York State Senate staff.

Brathwaite Nelson was appointed to the New York Supreme Court Appellate Division 2nd Department in 2016 by then-Governor Andrew Cuomo. This appointment made her the first African-American woman from Queens to be elevated to Associate Justice of the Appellate Division. The term for this office will end in 2032.

In 2004 and 2018, she was elected (then re-elected) to the New York Supreme Court 11th Judicial District.

Brathwaite Nelson is a Democrat.

== Personal life ==
Brathwaite Nelson is married to Nicholas J. Nelson, Ph.D. Together, the pair have three children.
