= Lilian Lewis =

Zoologist and endocrinologist

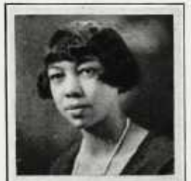
- 1925 Howard University yearbook portrait.
- Born: Lilian Burwell Leonora; August 13, 1904; Meridian, Mississippi
- Died: January 19, 1987 (aged 82); Winston-Salem, North Carolina
- Education: Howard University, University of Chicago
- Spouse: John F. Lewis
- Scientific career
- Fields: Zoology, Endocrinology.
- Thesis: A Study of Some Effects of Sex Hormones upon the Embryonic Reproductive System of the White Pekin Duck

Lilian Burwell Lewis (Note: Lewis' given name is alternately spelled as "Lilian" and "Lillian." This article uses "Lilian" throughout for consistency.) (August 13, 1904 – January 19, 1987) was an American zoologist known for being the first African-American woman to receive a doctorate degree from the University of Chicago and for her research in gonadogenesis. On November 8, 1960 she was elected to Winston-Salem Forsyth County School Board where was an advocate of equity and desegregation. She campaigned for equal treatment of children during a time of de facto segregation.

== Early life and education ==
Lewis was born Lilian Leonora Burwell in Meridian, Mississippi on August 13, 1904, as the ninth of thirteen children. In 1919 She earned a high school diploma from Tougaloo College before attending Howard University. In 1925 she studied under Ernest Everett Just and graduated with a bachelor's degree in biology. Lewis would then follow in the footsteps of another one of Just's students, Roger Arliner Young to study with Frank Rattray Lillie at the University of Chicago.

As a recipient of a General Education Board fellowship, Lewis earned her Master's Degree from the University of Chicago in 1931. She studied in Chicago during the summers and teaching Biology at Tillotson College during the school year.

Though her Ph.D. studies were delayed for several reasons – including the financial burden of attending university and the obligation to continue providing for her aging parents, (Note: "My mother was stricken with paralysis and is now an invalid. My father is too old to support her and take care of her needs properly. In rearing the thirteen children, my parents were unable to save very much for a time of need like this and I am the only one of the children without a family and able to contribute materially to their needs. If I should stop work they would be reduced to absolute want and so I must continue to make my monthly contributions.") – she completed a doctoral degree in endocrinology in 1946.

== Career and research ==
=== Teaching ===
Lewis held several teaching appointments throughout her career. She began with short stints as an assistant/associate professor at the State Agriculture and Mechanics College of South Carolina (1926–1929) and Morgan College (1929–1931); both before she began graduate studies. From 1931 to 1947, Lewis taught at Tillotson College to finance her doctoral studies, despite earning two Rosenwald Fellowships from the University of Chicago. After earning her doctorate, Lewis spent the remainder of her career as a full professor and Chairperson of the Natural Sciences Department at Winston-Salem Teacher's College. She retired in 1970. Her research explored gonadogenesis in ducks, cellular differentiation, embryology, and sex hormones.

=== Public Office ===
On November 8, 1960 Lewis ran for public office in Winston-Salem and was elected to the Forsyth County School Board. As the first Black member of the school board, Lewis was an advocate for the desegregation of schools. Despite Brown v. Board of Education finding school segregation unconstitutional six years earlier, many schools throughout the country were still de facto segregated. Lewis also campaigned for the fair treatment of low-income children regardless of race. Lewis was re-elected in 1962 and would continue to be re-elected until her retirement from the school board in 1970, despite a Republican board majority in 1968.

=== Published works ===
- Lewis, Lillian B. Early Differentiation of the Duck Gonad. Diss. University of Chicago, Department of Zoology, 1931.
- Lewis, Lillian B. "A Study of Some Effects of Sex Hormones upon the Embryonic Reproductive System of the White Pekin Duck." Physiological Zoology, vol. 19, no. 3, July 1946, pp. 282–329. DOI.org (Crossref), .
- Lewis, Lillian B., and L. V. Domm. "A Sexual Transformation of the Osseus Bulla in Duck Embryos Following Administration of Estrogen." Physiological Zoology, vol. 21, no. 1, Jan. 1948, pp. 65–69. DOI.org (Crossref),

== Personal life ==
At Howard University, Lewis was a member of the Freshman Debate Team in 1922, the Corresponding Secretary of the Alpha Kappa Mu scholarship society and a member of the Alpha Kappa Alpha sorority. While studying at the University of Chicago, she was a member of the honor societies Sigma Xi and Sigma Delta Epsilon.

Lewis married Winston-Salem native John Frank Lewis in 1934. Mr. Lewis was an Education and Psychology professor and Chair of the Winston-Salem College's Education and Psychology Department. Following their retirements, the Lewises established the Lewis Award for Academic Excellence. The award was a $500 prize for the member of the Winston-Salem State graduating class with the highest academic average. The two raised at least one child together. (Note: Sources contradict each other over whether or not Lilian and John had children of their own. However, it is believed that they were responsible for raising two nephews.)

In addition to her school board duties, Lewis was also Chief Judge of the State Spelling Bee.

Her 1925 Howard University yearbook quote was: "A winner never quits and a quitter never wins."
