= Viola Duvall Stewart =

American educational advocate (1919–2010)

- Born: Viola Louise Duvall; June 30, 1919; Charleston, South Carolina, US
- Died: December 10, 2010 (aged 91); Burtonsville, Maryland, US
- Education: Howard University
- Occupation: Teacher
- Known for: Duvall v. J.F. Seignous et al.

Viola Duvall Stewart (June 30, 1919 – December 10, 2010) was a teacher and educational advocate who fought for equal education for black students and equal pay for black teachers. The case, Viola Louise Duvall et al. V.J.F. Seignous, which was argued and won by Thurgood Marshall, was among the precedents that led to the landmark Brown vs. Board of Education decision.

== Early life ==
Viola Louise Duvall was born on June 30, 1919, in Charleston, South Carolina. Her parents were Pearl and Vincent Duvall. She grew up in Charleston. She graduated from Conception High School in 1937 and was listed as the class salutatorian.

After high school, she furthered her studies at Howard University where she was awarded her Bachelors of Science in chemistry in 1941. While she was at Howard University she joined Alpha Kappa Alpha, a historically black sorority.

== Career and civil rights advocacy ==
Stewart started her teaching career at Burke High School in Charleston, South Carolina. At this time, classrooms were still segregated, and she was having to teach with secondhand materials. There was also a push at this time to provide more extracurricular activities for black students. In order to obtain better materials for her students, she organized a fundraiser to fund the purchase of new in-date textbooks. As a black teacher, she was only making twelve dollars an hour.

In 1944 she was asked by the NAACP of South Carolina to become the plaintiff in a case that aimed to equalize pay between teachers in South Carolina. She would be the first to sue the state of South Carolina for uniform pay. Thurgood Marshall, NAACP Chief Council at the time, was her representative in the case. After fifteen minutes in trial, Duvall v. J.F. Seignous et al. had been decided, and Viola's side had won. Stewart's victory helped in leading advocates to build the pivotal Brown v. Board of Education court case of 1954. The result of the case led to equalized pay for teachers despite race. Even though Viola was listed as the plaintiff, she was not able to receive equal pay in South Carolina.

After raising her sons, she returned to the classroom in 1964. This time as a special education teacher for the visually impaired in high school and junior high schools in Philadelphia. Stewart continued teaching until 1981.

== Personal life ==
She married Nathaniel C. Stewart in 1945. He was a second lieutenant with the Tuskeegee Airmen. They moved to Philadelphia, Pennsylvania, his hometown. There, she took a break from teaching to raise her two sons. Once her sons were old enough,

Stewart remained active in Alpha Kappa Alpha until shortly before her death, attending the centennial celebration of AKA in Washington, D.C. in 2008. She died of Alzheimer's disease in Burtonsville, Maryland on December 10, 2010, at the age of 91 years. She was buried at Chelten Hills Cemetery.
