= Joyce London Alexander =

American judge (born 1949)

Chief Magistrate Judge of the United States District Court
- Incumbent
- Assumed office January 2, 1996
- Appointed by: Jimmy Carter

Personal details
- Born: 1949 (age 76–77) Cambridge, Massachusetts, U.S.
- Education: Howard University; New England School of Law (JD); New York University (additional classes)
- Profession: Magistrate judge

Joyce London Alexander (born 1949) is a former US district court magistrate judge. She was the first African-American to be appointed chief magistrate judge in the United States.

== Life ==
In 1949, Alexander was born in Cambridge, Massachusetts. Her parents were Edna and Oscar London. She attended Cambridge High and Latin School, where she was continually elected a class officer. While there, she became the first African-American president of the Student Council. She also participated on the track team. She went on to study at Howard University through a scholarship from the Boston NAACP. While in college, she worked as a legislative assistant to Tip O'Neill. She persuaded him to hire her as a legislative aide. Her work as a legislative assistant got her interested in work in justice. She graduated from Howard University in 1969. Afterward, she earned her J.D. from New England School of Law in 1972. She also received a grant from the NAACP to take additional classes at New York University on federal jurisdiction and labor law.

== Career ==
Alexander began her legal career in 1972. She became a staff attorney working for the Greater Boston Legal Assistance Project as a Reginald Heber Smith Community Lawyer fellow. After her fellowship, she was legal counsel for many years with the Youth Activities Commission in Boston. She also worked as an assistant professor at Tufts University, teaching urban law and black politics. She served as the chair of President Jimmy Carter's Massachusetts delegation at the Democratic National Convention. She also co-founded the Urban League of Eastern Massachusetts and was its first female president, along with being one of the youngest presidents of any Urban League. While there, she increased its budget tenfold. She became the first African-American woman nationwide, along with being the first woman in Massachusetts, to be an on-camera legal editor for a major network. Alexander was often called upon to appear on television and on interviews. In 1979, Alexander was appointed to the United States district court as a magistrate judge by President Jimmy Carter. She was the first African-American female judge to be appointed to that position, nationwide. She was also one of the youngest to ever be appointed to that position, nationwide. On January 2, 1996, she was made Chief Judge. She became the first African-American chief magistrate judge working on the federal bench. She also simultaneously became the first African-American chief judge of any court in Massachusetts.

== Community work ==
Alexander co-founded and served as president of the Urban League of Eastern Massachusetts. She also served as chairperson of the Massachusetts Black Judges Conference, wherein she developed a scholarship program for minority students of law. She served as chairperson of the Judicial Council of the National Bar Association from 1987 to 1988. She participates in the "Kids, Courts and Citizenship" program in Boston, which she founded and maintains. In the program, more than 5,000 fifth-grade students of Boston public schools have visited her courtroom, spoken with her, and held a mock trial in her courtroom.

== Awards ==
Alexander has received honorary law degrees from Northeastern University School of Law, Bridgewater State College, Suffolk University, and North Carolina State University. In 1980, Alexander was honored as one of the ten Outstanding Young Women in the United States. Additionally, the Boston Jaycees honored her as one of the Ten Outstanding Young Leaders of Massachusetts. The Southern Christian Leadership Conference gave her the Martin Luther King, Jr. Drum Major for Justice Award in 1985. In 1986, she received the Equal Justice Award from the National Bar Association. In 1992, the Cambridge Community Center gave her a Cambridge Community Service Award. In 1994, the National Bar Association's Judicial Council awarded her the William Hastie Award. In 1997, she received the C. Francis Stadford Award from the National Bar Association, which is their highest honor. Also in 1997, the Harvard University Foundation for Excellence in Multicultural and Racial Relations bestowed her with the Medal of Honor.

== See also ==
- List of first women lawyers and judges in the United States
