= Joy Harden Bradford =

American clinical psychologist (b. 1979)

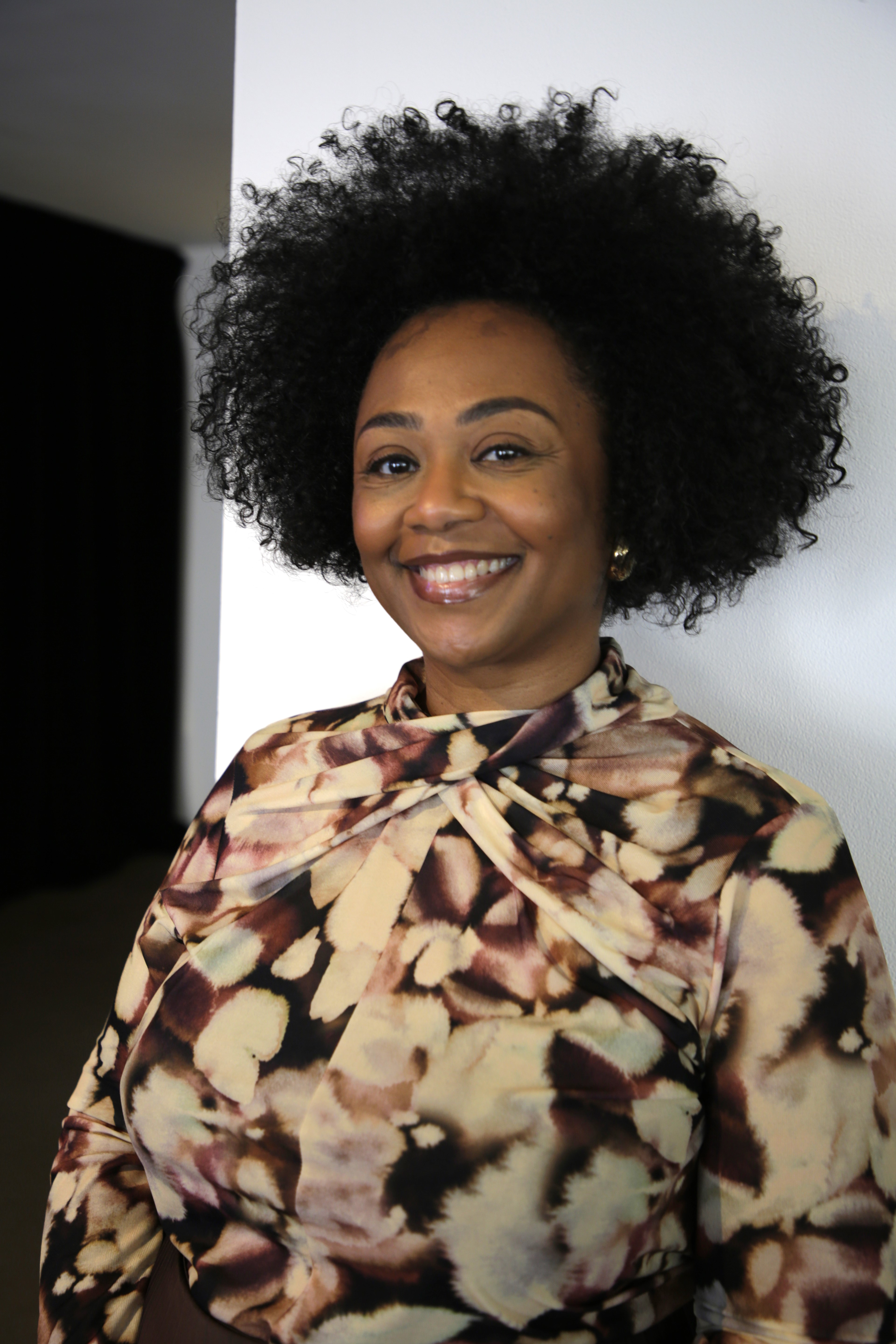
- Harden Bradford at Black Week 2025 in NYC.
- Born: 1979 (age 46–47); Louisiana
- Education: Xavier University of Louisiana (BA); Arkansas State University (MA); University of Georgia (PhD)
- Occupation: Clinical psychologist
- Known for: Therapy for Black Girls podcast
- Website: http://www.hellodrjoy.com

Joy Harden Bradford (born 1979) is an African American clinical psychologist based in Atlanta, Georgia. She is best known as the founder of a mental health platform called Therapy for Black Girls, which includes a podcast of the same name, that specializes in mental health issues relevant to Black women. As of 2019, the podcast's episodes have been downloaded over two million times.

== Early life and education ==
Harden Bradford was raised in Paincourtville, Louisiana. She received her bachelor's degree from Xavier University of Louisiana and her master's degree in vocational rehabilitation counseling from Arkansas State University. She completed her doctoral degree in counseling psychology from the University of Georgia. She is a member of the Alpha Kappa Alpha sorority.

== Career ==
Harden Bradford is a licensed psychologist who specializes in culturally competent practice for African American women. She has been a mental health practitioner since 2011 and worked as a college counselor until 2014, when she created Therapy for Black Girls. She came up with the idea for the name after watching Black Girls Rock! on BET. She stated in an interview with The Huffington Post that she wanted to start the platform because, "I wanted to talk about things like how your mental health is impacted by your lack of sleep, or how all the hours you spend on Instagram can actually make you feel bad about yourself...I don’t think we always do a great job focusing on mental wellness, and realizing that we all have mental health we have to take care of."

The platform includes a Facebook group called the Thrive Tribe, a directory of mental health therapists, a blog, and a podcast, also called Therapy for Black Girls. The podcast covers a variety of topics targeted at Black women, such as navigating life after divorce, or pop-culture topics like how to develop your own "hot girl summer."

Harden Bradford's work highlights the stigma of mental health in the African American community and the need for Black women to set boundaries. She has stated that she also seeks to normalize therapy in Black communities. In 2019 Harden Bradford developed an online therapist directory due to high demand for recommendations of Black women therapists.

She was recruited to co-host MTV's Teen Mom: Young + Pregnant reunion in December 2018.

Harden Bradford published her debut book Sisterhood Heals in 2023. The book "guides readers on how to find and nurture more fulfilling friendships."

== Personal life ==
Harden Bradford is married.

== Accolades ==
- 2021 – Winner, Webby Awards, Health & Wellness Podcast (for Therapy for Black Girls)
- 2021 – Winner, Ambies Awards, Best Wellness or Relationships Podcast (for Therapy for Black Girls)
- 2023 – Winner, NAACP Image Awards, Outstanding Lifestyle/Self-Help Podcast (for Therapy for Black Girls)

== Works ==
=== Podcast ===
- Therapy for Black Girls

=== Book ===
- 2023. Sisterhood Heals: The Transformative Power of Healing in Community. Ballantine Books.Publication date June 27, 2023 ISBN 9780593497241

== See also ==
- Race and health in the United States
- Mental distress
