= Miki Turner =

American professor and photojournalist

- Education: Hampton University; University of Southern California (MCG); Boston University (M.S.)
- Occupations: Professor and photojournalist
- Writing career
- Subjects: Sports, pop culture, diversity
- Notable work: Journey To The Woman I've Come To Love (2013)
- Website: mikiphotogallery.com

Miki Turner is a professor and photojournalist, and the first regularly-featured African-American female sports columnist at a major metropolitan daily newspaper.

== Early life ==
Miki Turner grew up in the Cincinnati, Ohio suburb of Wyoming, where her family were among the first residents. She is the daughter of William and Dorothy Turner. Her father, a Pullman porter, died in 2009. She has two older brothers, Gary, an award-winning educator and Billy. A third brother, Kenny, died in 1994. Miki Turner was educated in the nationally ranked Wyoming Public School system. She participated in the band and drama department. As a child she was very interested in art, photography, music, movies, television and cooking. After high school she attended Hampton University, majoring in mass media arts. She hosted the popular radio show Miki's Mellow Minutes and was president of Women in Communications, Inc. her senior year. Her other activities included intramural athletics and photographer for the school yearbook. She was Miss Girls Athletic Association her freshman year; and Miss Women in Communication, her senior year. She received her MCG degree from the University of Southern California, her B.A. degree from Hampton, her M.S. in photojournalism from Boston University and was a Maynard Institute for Journalism Education fellow at the University of California-Berkeley.

== Career ==
Miki Turner's journalism career began as a general assignment intern at The Kentucky Enquirer. From there she worked as a sports writer/photojournalist for several weeklies before enrolling at Boston University (BU). After BU she moved to New York City, working for several companies before heading back down the coast to Hampton, VA, to accept a position as public relations director for the Central Intercollegiate Athletic Association. After completing her fellowship at Berkeley, she became the first African-American female to write a regularly featured sports column at a major American daily newspaper in 1989 while at the Oakland Tribune. She went on to cover pro and college teams for the Orange County Register, before switching gears to cover entertainment for several outlets including: Satellite Orbit/Satellite Direct, TV Online, The Ft. Worth-Star Telegram, Essence, Ebony and JET. Turner has also worked for ESPN.com, where she was one of the architects for Page 3, and as a producer at ESPN Hollywood. She is currently an associate professor of professional practice at USC, and the newly-named curator of a Lee Crum photography collection.

== Journey To The Woman I've Come To Love ==
Journey To The Woman I've Come To Love, Turner's first book, is a photo book featuring celebrities as well as extraordinary lesser known women. The book asks one question: "at what point did you fall in love with yourself" and has been embraced by women worldwide. It was published in January 2013. Her second book tomorrow, debuted in January, 2014. It features portraits of children from around the world.

== Awards ==
Turner has won many awards including: 2023 USC Black Alumni Association Barbara Solomon Staff & Faculty Award; 2022 National Association of Black Journalists Educator of the Year; 2021 USC Mentoring Award; 2021 Behind the Lens award from Black Women Film Network; 2014 Florence Biennale Award (photography); 2014 Woman of Excellence, Wiley College; 2012 Hampton University Alumni Legacy Award; 1995 NABJ award; 1992 DAISY (Distinguished Achievement in Inspiring Youth) from the U.S. Girl Scouts; 1980 Kodak International Newspaper Snapshot Award.

== Personal ==
Miki Turner was born on January 3 in Cincinnati, Oh. She is a member of Alpha Kappa Alpha sorority, and the TV Critics Association. She currently resides in Los Angeles, California.
