= List of Department of Housing and Urban Development appointments by Joe Biden =

Below is a list of nominations and appointments to the Department of Housing and Urban Development by Joe Biden, the 46th president of the United States. As of May 3, 2024, according to tracking by The Washington Post and Partnership for Public Service, 6 nominees have been confirmed, 0 nominees are being considered by the Senate, 6 positions do not have nominees, and 2 appointments have been made to positions that do not require Senate confirmation.

== Color key ==
Denotes appointees awaiting Senate confirmation.

Denotes appointees serving in an acting capacity.

Denotes appointees who have left office or offices which have been disbanded.

== Leadership ==
| Office | Nominee | Assumed office | Left office |
|---|---|---|---|
— Secretary of Housing and Urban Development
| — Secretary of Housing and Urban Development | Adrianne Todman | March 22, 2024 | – |
| — Secretary of Housing and Urban Development | Marcia Fudge | March 10, 2021 (Confirmed March 10, 2021, 66–34) | March 22, 2024 |
| — Deputy Secretary of Housing and Urban Development | Adrianne Todman | June 14, 2021 (Confirmed June 10, 2021 by voice vote) | — |

== Office of the Secretary ==
| Office | Nominee | Assumed office | Left office |
|---|---|---|---|
| — General Counsel of Housing and Urban Development | Damon Smith | August 12, 2021 (Confirmed August 11, 2021 by voice vote) | — |
| — Chief Financial Officer of Housing and Urban Development | Vinay Singh | July 5, 2022 (Confirmed June 22, 2022 by voice vote) | — |
| — Assistant Secretary of Housing and Urban Development (Administration) | Elizabeth de León Bhargava | May 13, 2022 (Confirmed May 3, 2022, 62–34) | — |
| — Assistant Secretary of Housing and Urban Development (Congressional and Intergovernmental Relations) | Kimberly McClain | January 5, 2023 (Confirmed December 19, 2022 by voice vote) | — |
| — Assistant Secretary of Housing and Urban Development (Public Affairs) | Beth Lynk | October 19, 2022 | — |
| — Assistant Secretary of Housing and Urban Development (Public Affairs) | Addie Whisenant | March 15, 2021 | May 2022 |

== HUD Assistant Secretaries ==
| Office | Nominee | Assumed office | Left office |
|---|---|---|---|
| — Assistant Secretary of Housing and Urban Development (Housing) & Federal Housing Commissioner | Julia Gordon | May 20, 2022 (Confirmed May 11, 2022, 51–50); *Vice President Harris cast tie-breaking vote* | — |

== HUD Agency ==
| Office | Nominee | Assumed office | Left office |
Government National Mortgage Association
| — President of the Government National Mortgage Association | Alanna McCargo | January 3, 2022 (Confirmed December 14, 2021 by voice vote) | May 3, 2024 |
| — Executive Vice President of the Government National Mortgage Association | Sam Valverde | March 16, 2022 | — |

== Withdrawn nominations ==
| Office | Nominee | Announced | Withdrawn | Notes |
|---|---|---|---|---|
| — Assistant Secretary of Housing and Urban Development (Public and Indian Housing) | Arthur Jemison | September 13, 2021 | April 25, 2022 | |
| — Assistant Secretary of Housing and Urban Development (Community Planning and Development) | Mark Colón | April 27, 2021 | January 3, 2022 | Nomination not resent upon expiration |
| — Assistant Secretary of Housing and Urban Development (Fair Housing and Equal Opportunity) | Dave Uejio | June 24, 2021 | January 3, 2024 | Nomination not resent upon expiration |
| — Assistant Secretary of Housing and Urban Development (Policy Development and Research) | Solomon Greene | April 23, 2021 | January 3, 2024 | Nomination not resent upon expiration |

== See also ==
- Cabinet of Joe Biden, for the vetting process undergone by top-level roles including advice and consent by the Senate
- List of executive branch 'czars' e.g. Special Advisor to the President

== Notes ==
Confirmation votes

Confirmations by roll call vote

Confirmations by voice vote
