= Kimberly A. McClain =

Assistant Secretary Congressional and Intergovernmental Relations

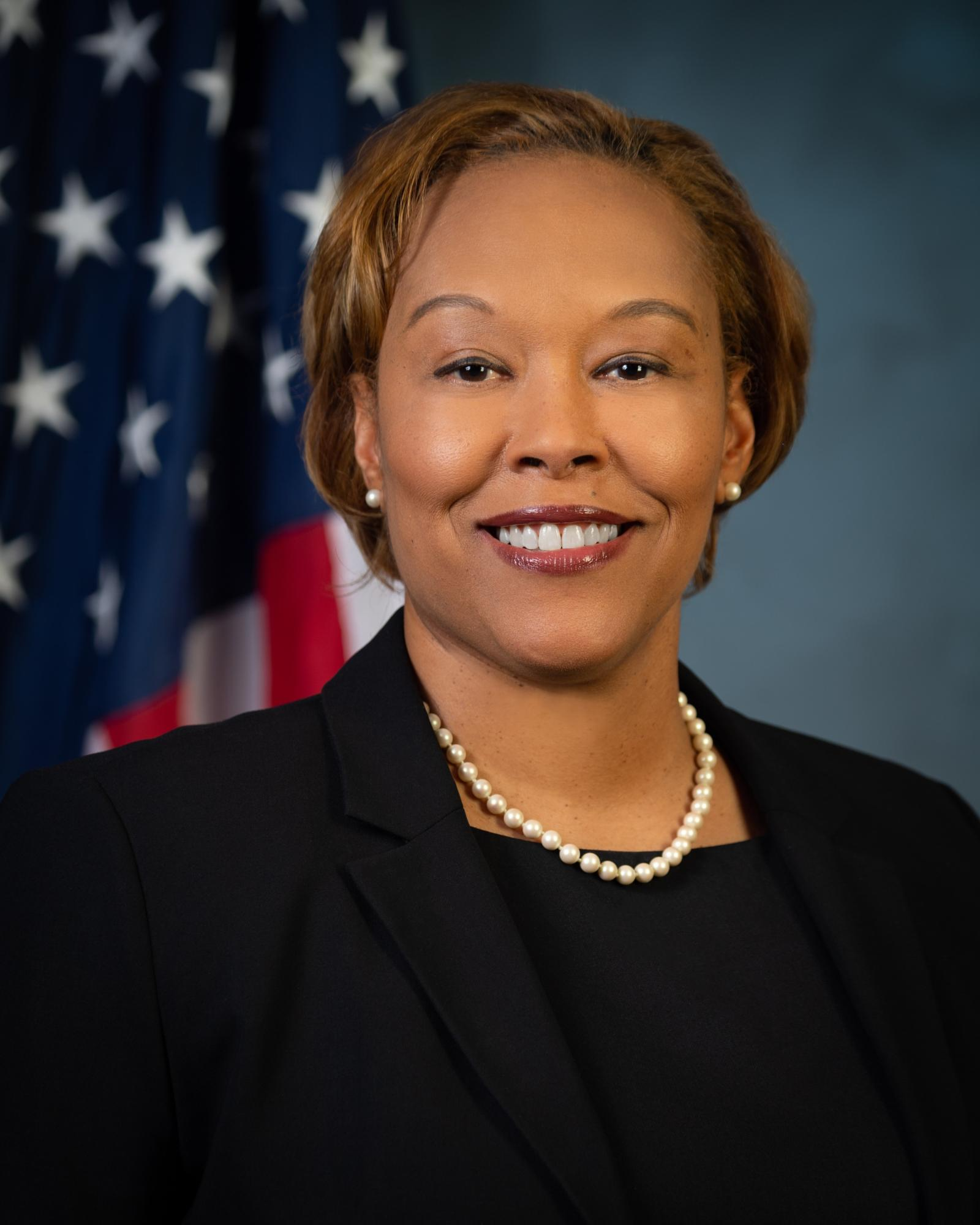
United States Assistant Secretary of Housing and Urban Development for Congressional and Intergovernmental Relations In Office: January 3, 2023 – January 20, 2025: Nominated by / Joe Biden; Succeeded / Leonard Wolfson; Deputy Assistant Secretary of Department of Veteran Affairs for Congressional and Legislative Affairs In Office: February 8, 2021 – January 3, 2023 Military service: Branch/service / United States Air Force; Years of service / 1991–2021; Rank / Lieutenant Colonel

Kimberly Ann McClain (born August 5, 1970) is an American government official and retired military official who had served as the Assistant Secretary for Congressional and Intergovernmental Relations.

In June 2022, McClain was nominated by President Joe Biden to serve as Assistant Secretary for Congressional and Intergovernmental Relations for the U.S. Department of Housing and Urban Development. McClain was confirmed as Assistant Secretary for Congressional and Intergovernmental Relations on December 19, 2022, and was sworn in by Secretary Marcia L. Fudge on January 5, 2023.

Prior to her Senate confirmation in 2023, McClain served in the Biden–Harris Administration as the Deputy Assistant Secretary for Congressional and Legislative Affairs at the United States Department of Veterans Affairs from 2021-2023.

== Early life and education ==
A native of Rockford, IL U.S., McClain earned her Bachelor of Arts in Psychology with a minor in Sociology from the University of Texas at Arlington, Texas, a Master of Science in Human Relations and International Business from Amberton University, and a Doctor of Philosophy in International Business from Northcentral University.

== Career ==
McClain served in the United States Air Force for 29 years and has worked in private and public sector roles.

== Personal ==
McClain is a member of the Prince George’s County (MD) Chapter of The Links, Incorporated and the Xi Omega chapter of Alpha Kappa Alpha sorority in Washington, DC.

McClain speaks frequently at events to include GlobalMindED Inclusive Leaders Awards and the GlobalMindED and Foundation for the Support of the United Nations (FSUN) panel on “Transforming Environmental Barriers: Unleashing Broadband, Transportation, Health, Wealth and a Sustainable Planet”.

== See also see ==
- List of Department of Housing and Urban Development appointments by Joe Biden
