= JaQuitta Williams =

- Occupation: Television journalist

JaQuitta Williams is a television journalist, who worked in Atlanta, Georgia, for WSB-TV and WGCL-TV. Williams was diagnosed with breast cancer in 2007. Her cancer diagnosis was the trigger for her to become a spokesperson for healthy living. In 2009 Williams took an 18-month leave of absence from WSB-TV to fight her cancer diagnosis.

In July 2010 Williams appeared at an event organized by fashion for a cure, a non-profit dedicated to fight cancer that encourages survivors to appear or perform at its fund-raising events. The organization encourages local groups to host fashion shows where all the models are cancer survivors. Williams sang the Destiny's Child song "Survivor" one month after she returned to work following her 18-month leave of absence.

Williams also appeared in a film directed by Robert Townsend, Musical Theatre of Hope.
