= Clara Burrill Bruce =

American lawyer

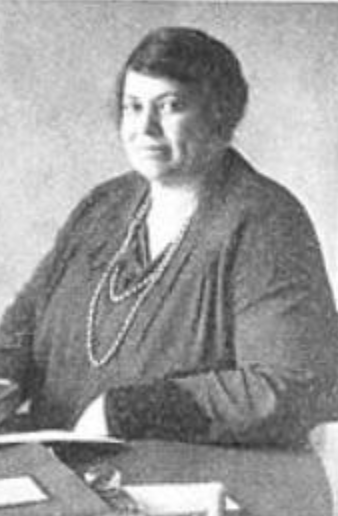
- Clara Burrill Bruce, from a 1929 publication
- Born: Clara Washington Burrill; June 25, 1879; Washington, D.C., U.S.
- Died: January 22, 1947 (age 67); New York, New York, U.S.
- Occupations: Lawyer, editor, educator, writer, housing expert
- Spouse: Roscoe Conkling Bruce
- Relatives: Mary P. Burrill (sister); Blanche Bruce (father-in-law); Josephine Beall Willson Bruce (mother-in-law)

Clara Washington Burrill Bruce (June 25, 1879 – January 22, 1947) was an American lawyer, writer, clubwoman, and editor. She was the first Black woman elected to edit a law review, at Boston University School of Law in 1924. In the 1930s she helped found the Harlem Congressional League and the National Council of Negro Women.

== Early life and education ==
Burrill was born in Washington, D.C., the daughter of John Henry Burrill and Clara Eliza Washington Burrill. Both of her parents were born in Virginia before the American Civil War. She graduated from M Street High School in 1897, and from Miner Normal School. She attended Cook County Normal School, Cornell University Summer School, Howard University for one year and Radcliffe College for two years. She graduated from Boston University School of Law (BU) in 1926, at the age of 46. At BU, she was the first Black woman elected editor of an American law review; she was the Boston University Law Review's editor-in-chief in 1925. She was a speaker at commencement. She was a member of Alpha Kappa Alpha.

Her sister Mary Powell Burrill was a playwright and educator, and longtime partner of educator Lucy Diggs Slowe. Mary P. Burrill and Slowe were also founding members of the National Council of Negro Women.

== Career ==
Bruce was hired as a teacher in East Orange, New Jersey, in 1899, and occasionally taught her husband's courses at Tuskegee Institute between 1904 and 1906, while he was traveling with Booker T. Washington. In 1926, Bruce became the third Black woman admitted to the Massachusetts Bar. She and her husband managed Dunbar Apartments, a large cooperative housing complex in Harlem, from 1927 to 1936. She was described as "one of the few women housing experts in the United States", when she spoke at the Annual Women's Dinner at Howard University in 1934. She was associate editor of the Dunbar News from 1929 to 1934, and associate editor at a Black publishing company.

Bruce was involved in New York politics, and active in the National Urban League, the League of Women Voters and the NAACP. She was the founding vice-president of the Harlem Congressional League in 1934, working with the league's president Julia Coleman-Robinson and others to elect a Black congressman from Harlem. In 1936, she was a founding vice president of the National Council of Negro Women.

== Publications ==
- "We Who Are Dark" (1918, poem)

== Personal life and legacy ==
Burrill married educator Roscoe Conkling Bruce in 1903, at a wedding performed by Francis James Grimké. They had three children, Clara, Roscoe Jr., and Burrill. She died in 1947, at the age of 67, in New York City. The Bruces' papers are in the Moorland-Spingarn Research Center at Howard University. There is a Clara Burrill Bruce scholarship fund at Boston University School of Law, endowed to support first-generation college students and students from other underrepresented groups.
