= Mordecai Wyatt Johnson =

Pastor and president of Howard University

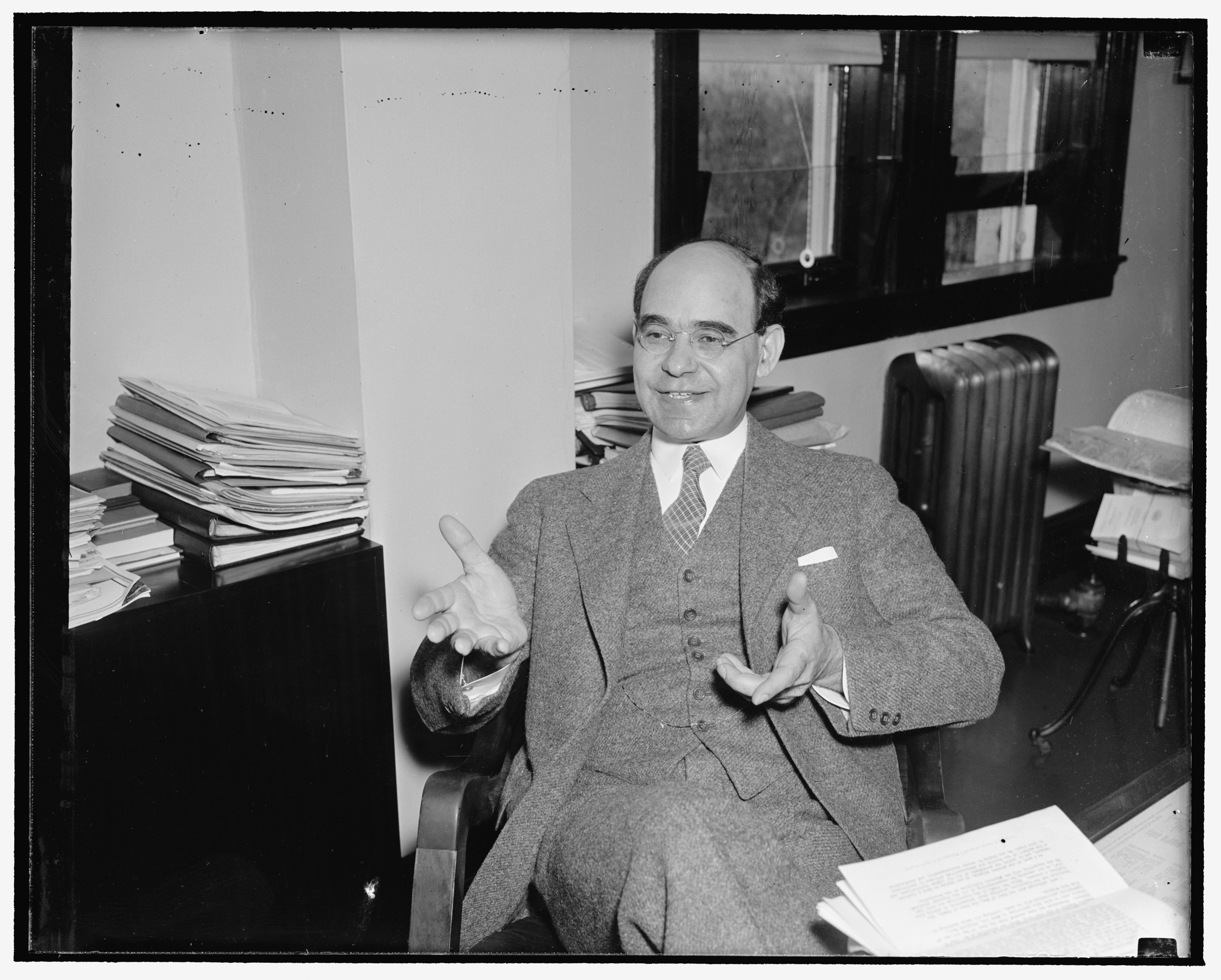
- Born: January 4, 1890; Paris, Tennessee
- Died: September 10, 1976 (aged 86); Washington, D.C.
- Education: Morehouse College; Harvard University
- Employer: Howard University
- Known for: First African-American president of Howard University
- Awards: Spingarn Medal

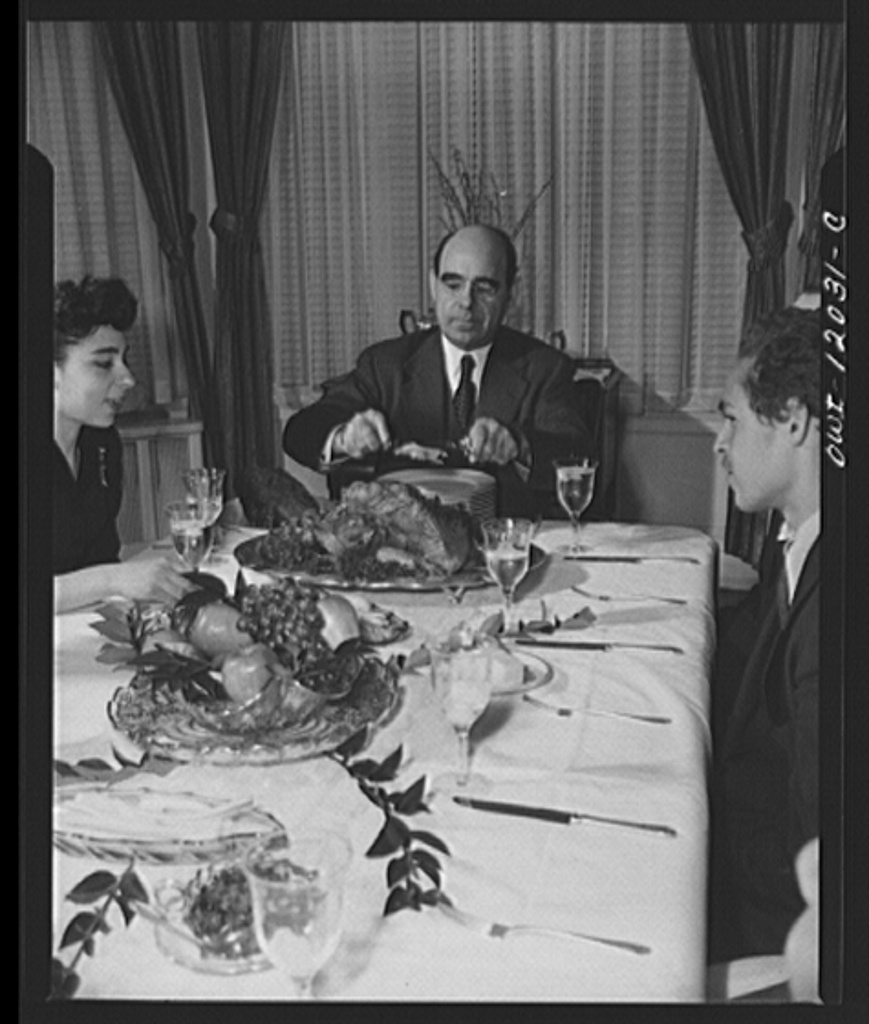
Mordecai Johnson, president of Howard University, serving portions of Thanksgiving turkey to members of his family in 1942.

Mordecai Wyatt Johnson (January 4, 1890 – September 10, 1976) was an American educator and pastor. He served as the first African-American president of Howard University, from 1926 until 1960. Johnson has been considered one of the three leading African-American preachers of the early 20th-century, along with Vernon Johns and Howard Thurman.

== Early life ==
Johnson was born on January 12, 1890, in Paris, Tennessee, to parents who were former slaves. His father was the Reverend Wyatt J. Johnson, a preacher and mill worker. His mother, Carolyn Freeman, was a domestic worker for one of the prominent families in town.

== Education ==
Johnson attended a small elementary school in his native town. Afterward, he moved to Nashville, where he studied at Roger Williams University. Later he studied at Howe Institute in Memphis.

He transferred to the Atlanta Baptist College (now Morehouse College, a historically black college), where he completed his secondary and undergraduate education. During his college career, he was a member of the debating team and the Glee Club, a star athlete in three sports, and quarterback of the football team. Offered a faculty position at the college upon graduation, he taught English and economics and served a year as acting dean. He maintained a profound interest in economics throughout his career, an interest that was apparent in some of his major speeches.

After one year of teaching, he continued his education at the University of Chicago, where he received a second A.B. degree, and at the Rochester Theological Seminary in Rochester, New York, where he earned the B.D. degree. At Rochester he was profoundly influenced by the great "social gospel" advocate, Walter Rauschenbusch. His experiences there strongly influenced his thinking and his entire career. He also earned a Doctor of Divinity degree at Harvard University in 1923.

== Family ==
Johnson married Anna Ethelyn Gardner on December 25, 1916. They had five children: Carolyn Elizabeth Johnson, Mordecai Wyatt Johnson Jr., Archer Clement Johnson, William Howard Johnson, and Anna Faith Johnson.

== Career ==
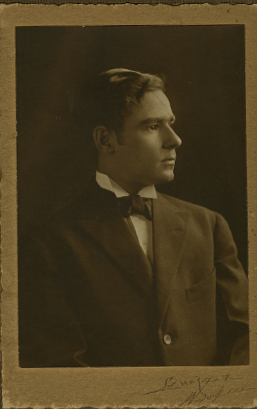
Johnson as a younger man.

Following a brief stint as secretary of the western region of the Student YMCA, in 1917 he became pastor of the First Baptist Church in Charleston, West Virginia. He later founded a chapter of the National Association for the Advancement of Colored People (NAACP).

=== Presidency of Howard University ===
On June 26, 1926, at the age of 36, Johnson was unanimously elected the eleventh President of Howard University, becoming the first African American to serve as the permanent head of that institution. Prior to his appointment Johnson had served as Professor of Economics and History at Morehouse College. He had also served as Pastor of the First Baptist Church in Charleston, West Virginia.

During his tenure, Johnson appointed Charles Hamilton Houston as dean of the law school, who played a significant role in dismantling the Jim Crow laws.

Johnson raised millions of dollars for new buildings and for upgrading all of the schools. National honor societies, including Phi Beta Kappa, were established on the campus of Howard.

Johnson also clashed with the Dean of Women, Lucy Diggs Slowe, as he and the Howard University Board of Trustees tried to force Dean Slowe to move out of the house she shared with Mary Burrill and move into a building on campus in 1933.

During his administration, it was said that Howard had the greatest collection of African American scholars to be found anywhere. Notable scholars at Howard included:

- Alain LeRoy Locke, graduated from English and Philosophy at Harvard, and was the first African American Rhodes Scholar,
- Ralph Bunche, professor of political science and later a Nobel Laureate;
- Charles R. Drew, who perfected the use of blood plasma;
- Percy Lavon Julian, a noted chemist; and
- Sterling Allen Brown, professor of English and noted Harlem Renaissance poet;
- Merze Tate, diplomatic scholar and first African American woman to attend the University of Oxford.

Johnson brought Howard University into national prominence and served as president of Howard for 34 years, since 1926 until his retirement in 1960. In this time the enrollment at Howard University increased from 2,000 in 1926 to more than 10,000 in 1960.

=== Johnson the Orator ===
Johnson was an annual speaker for the Education Night at the National Baptist Convention, a speaker at the Ford Hall Forum in Boston, and spoke alongside Martin Luther King Jr. and others at the 1957 Prayer Pilgrimage for Freedom. He traveled 25,000 miles a year throughout the country speaking principally on topics such as racism, segregation, and discrimination. In 1951 he was a member of the American delegation to the NATO meetings in London.

== Awards and recognitions ==
In 1929, the National Association for the Advancement of Colored People (NAACP) awarded Johnson the Spingarn Medal (its highest honor at that time), for Johnson's ability to secure annual federal funds to support the university's financial future.

== Death ==
Johnson died on September 10, 1976, at the age of 86, in Washington, D.C.
