= Shaumba-Yandje Dibinga =

Dancer and founder of OrigiNation

Shaumba-Yandje Dibinga is a dancer, choreographer, director and founder of a nonprofit performing arts organization, the OrigiNation Cultural Arts Center (OrigiNation), in the Roxbury neighborhood of Boston. The cultural center offers dance arts and leadership programming to youth in the neighborhoods of Dorchester, Roxbury and Mattapan.

== Background and education ==
Shaumba-Yandje Dibinga is of Congolese descent. She was born to Rev. Dr. Dibinga and Dr. Ngolela Dibinga, immigrants from the Democratic Republic of Congo. When Shaumba-Yandje and her family moved to Mattapan and Roxbury, they were bullied by neighborhood residents. Shaumba-Yandje formed the cultural center to support youth with similar experiences.

Shaumba-Yandje Dibinga holds a BA from University of Massachusetts, Boston and has trained at the Boston Conservatory and the Alvin Ailey American Dance Theater.

== Career ==
Shaumba-Yandje Dbinga founded OrigiNation in 1994. OrigiNation students organized rallies to bring awareness to police brutality in the Roxbury neighborhood after the murder of George Floyd. In 2023, OrigiNation's resident dance company held a year-long residency at the Greater Roxbury Arts & Cultural Center. OrigiNation held a Kwanzaa performance at the Kennedy Center in 2024. The dance company also held a Kwanzaa performance at the Roxbury Community College in 2025.

== Honors and awards ==
The Barr Foundation named Shaumba-Yandje Dinbiga to its 2011 class of fellows. Shaumba-Yandje Dibinga was given the Community Service Award by Roxbury Community College in 2024. Shauma-Yandje and OrigiNation received a grant from the Boston Foundation and Aliad Fund in 2019. She has also been awarded by the Boston branch of the NAACP and the Berklee College of Music. In 2023, she was recognized as one of "Boston’s most admired, beloved, and successful Black Women leaders" by the Black Women Lead project.
