= Blanche K. Bruce House =

Historic house in Washington, D.C., United States

- U.S. National Register of Historic Places
- U.S. National Historic Landmark
- D.C. Inventory of Historic Sites
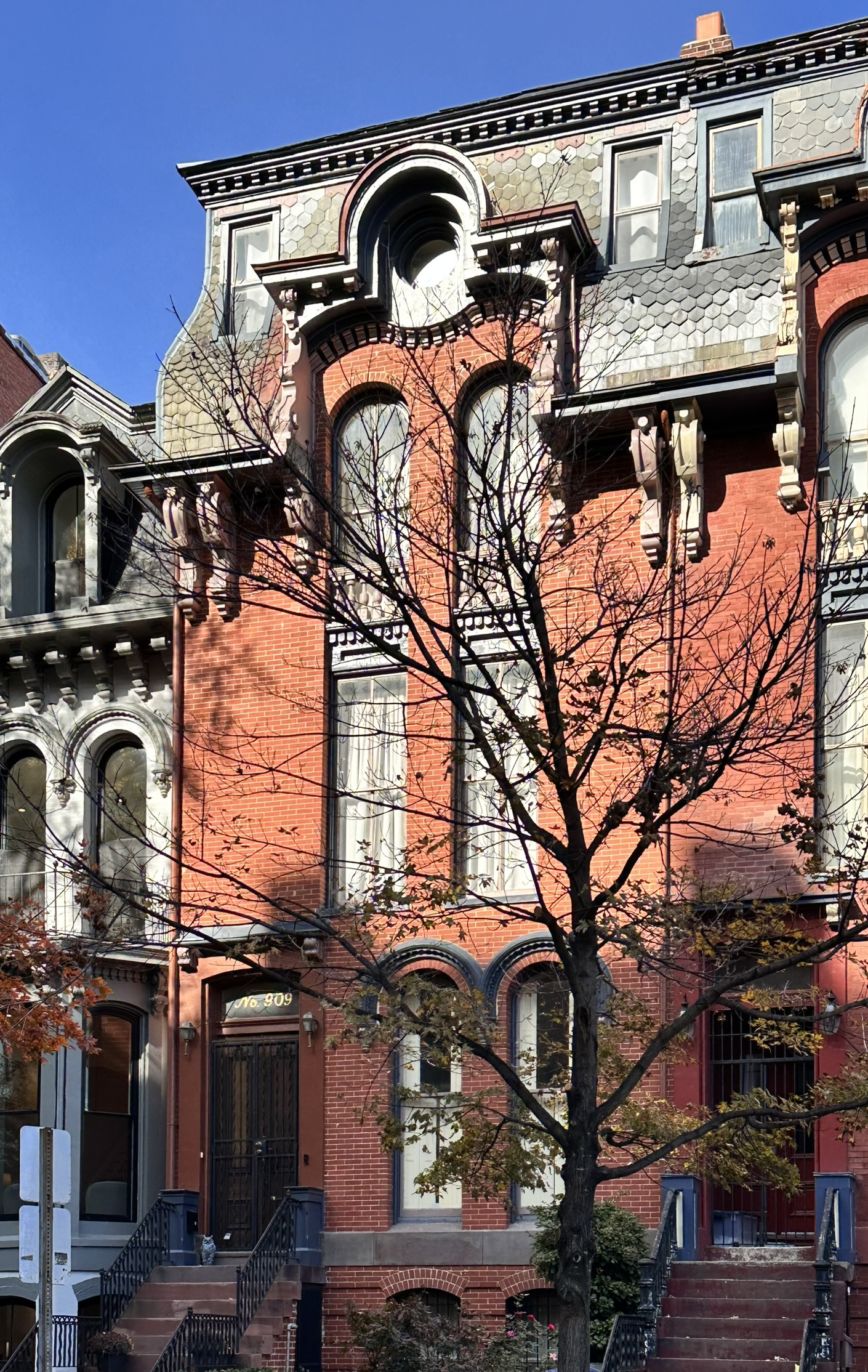
- Blanche K. Bruce House in 2023

- Location within Washington, D.C. Location within the United States
- Location: 909 M St., NW, Washington, D.C.
- Coordinates: 38°54′21″N 77°1′29″W
- Area: less than one acre
- Built: 1865
- Architectural style: Second Empire
- NRHP reference No.: 75002046

Significant dates
- Added to NRHP: May 15, 1975
- Designated NHL: May 15, 1975
- Designated DCIHS: April 29, 1975

The Blanche K. Bruce House is a historic house at 909 M Street NW in Washington, D.C. Built in 1865, it was a home of slave-born Blanche K. Bruce (1 March 1841 – 17 March 1898), who was the first African American to serve a full term in the U.S. Senate, and his wife Josephine. It was declared a National Historic Landmark in 1975. It was successfully nominated to the National Register of Historic Places by the Afro-American Bicentennial Corporation on May 15, 1975.

== Description and history ==
The Blanche K. Bruce House is located in the southernmost part of Washington's Shaw neighborhood, on the north side of M Street between 9th and 10th Streets. It is one half of a duplex, a 3 1/2-story structure, with walls of brick and a brick foundation, and a slate mansard roof providing a full fourth floor. The two building units have virtually identical exteriors, with a three-bay ground floor with the entrance in the left bay, and two bays in each of the upper floors. Ground floor windows are set in rounded-arch openings, as are third-floor windows, which rise into the elongated mansard roof's steep section. The short fourth floor is capped by a dentillated edge at the transition between the roof sections.

The house was built in 1865 and is fairly typical of the Second Empire architecture then popular; its designer is unknown. It was the home of Blanche Bruce, who represented Mississippi as a United States senator from 1875 to 1881. Bruce was the first African American to serve a full term in the Senate; during his tenure he also briefly served as the Presiding officer of the United States Senate in 1879, the only former slave to do so. During his term, Bruce advocated for the integration of the United States Army, and for policies supporting the needs of poor (and recently freed) African Americans. Bruce remained in Washington after his term ended in 1881, serving as the Register of the Treasury, the District's recorder of deeds, and as a trustee of Howard University.

== See also ==
- List of National Historic Landmarks in Washington, D.C.
- National Register of Historic Places in Washington, D.C.
