= Slowe-Burrill House =

Historic house in Washington, D.C., United States

- U.S. National Register of Historic Places
- U.S. National Historic Landmark
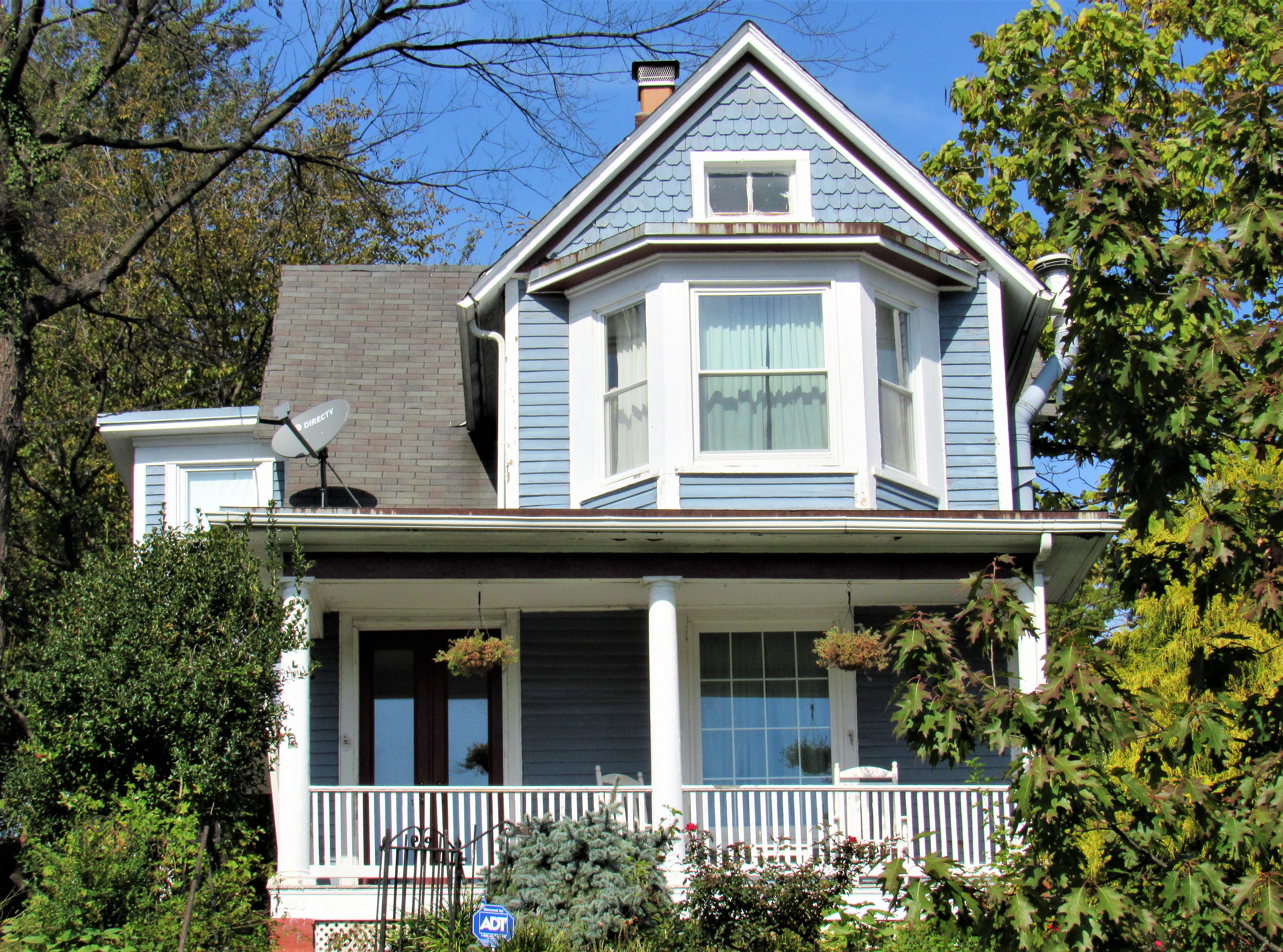
- Slowe-Burrill House in 2020

- Location within District of Columbia Location within the United States
- Location: 1256 Kearny Street, N.E., Washington, D.C.
- Coordinates: 38°55′51″N 76°59′20″W
- Built: 1890
- Architectural style: Queen Anne
- NRHP reference No.: 100005324

Significant dates
- Added to NRHP: October 5, 2020
- Designated NHL: December 13, 2024

The Slowe-Burrill House is a house in the Brookland neighborhood of Washington, D.C. Built in 1890 in the Queen Anne style, the home was occupied from 1922 to 1937 by Lucy Slowe and Mary Burrill, notable African American educators who are thought by historians to have been a couple. The house was listed on the National Register of Historic Places in 2020 and designated a National Historic Landmark in 2024 for its significance to African American and LGBTQ history.

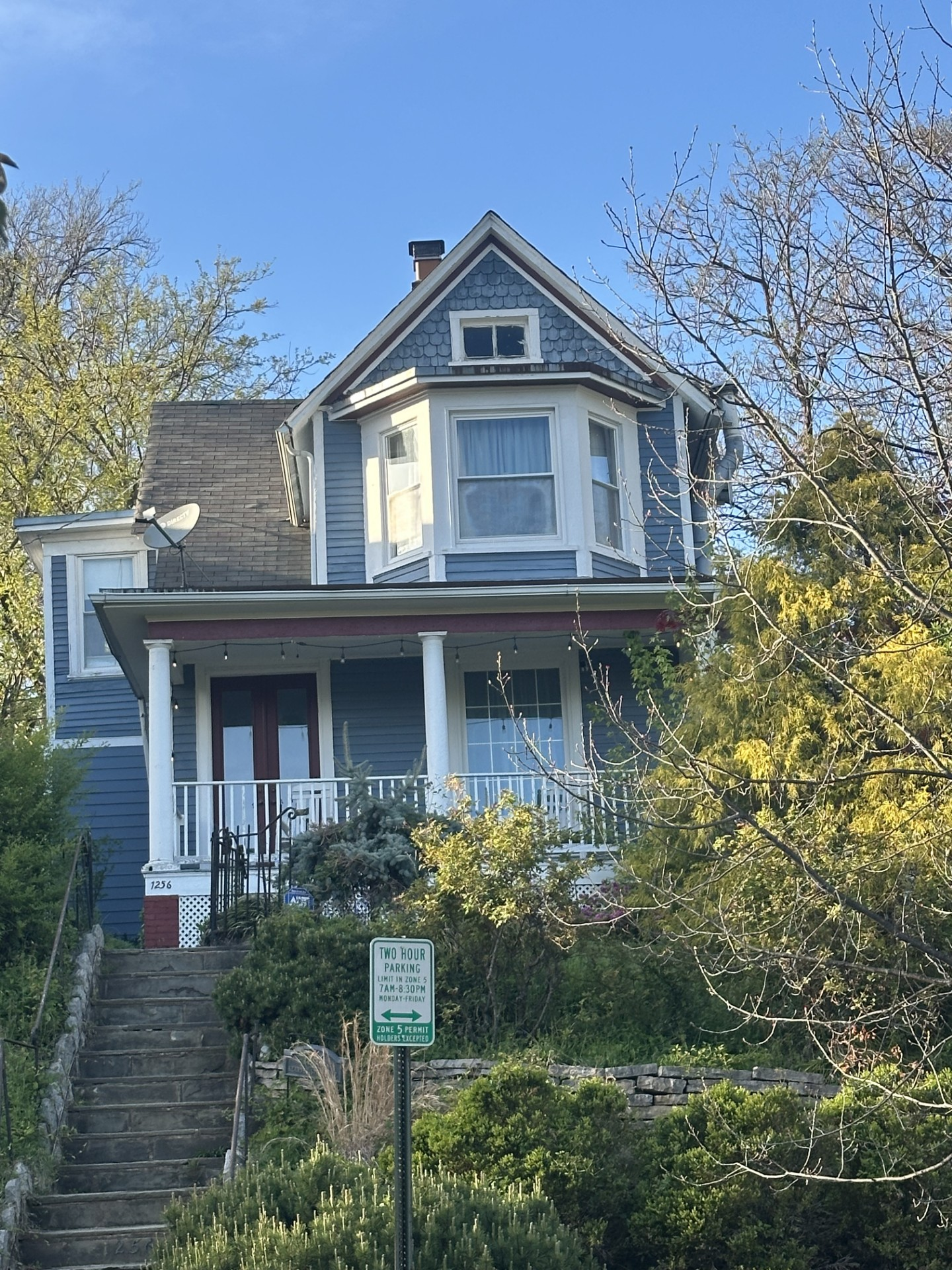
Slowe-Burrill House in April 2025

== History ==
The house at 1256 Kearny Street NE was built for the original owner James T. Ward, an Irish immigrant, in 1890. It is a two-and-a-half-story structure in the Queen Anne style.

Lucy Slowe and Mary Burrill, two African American educators, bought the house together in 1922 after Slowe was appointed Dean of Women at Howard University.

At a time when lesbian relationships were extremely taboo, Slowe and Burrill kept their romantic relationship under wraps professionally, but their close friends treated them as a couple. They frequently used the property's spacious rear yard for social gatherings of African-American women intellectuals. Slowe also often used the house to host students. Slowe often hosted students around the fireplace or on the lawn of the rear yard. The House was used to host students involved with the Women Student's League and a yearly reception for graduating female students.

When Lucy Slowe was first hired as Dean of Women at Howard University, then president J. Stanley Durkee allowed Slowe to live off campus. In June 1925, the Howard University Board of Trustees attempted to force Slowe to live on campus. Instead, President Durkee honored his agreement with Slowe and continued to allow her to live off campus. In 1933, Howard president Mordecai W. Johnson and the Board of Trustees at one point pressured Slowe to move onto campus. On April, 28th, 1933 the Board of Trustees voted to require that Slowe live on campus. Lucy Slowe fought to remain in the house at 1256 Kearny Street. Lucy Slowe received both private and public support from many important people and organizations including Coralie Franklin Cook, Roscoe Conkling Bruce, Sarah Sturtevant, Thyrsa Amos, the Baltimore Afro-American, Charlotte Atwood, Marion T. Wright, Eva M. Holmes, Alice Nelson William, and Mary McLeod Bethune. Dean Slowe never moved onto campus and instead stayed in her 1256 Kearny Street house with Mary Burrill. The pair lived there together for 15 years until Slowe's death in 1937, after which a mourning Burrill sold the house and moved into an apartment near Howard.

The D.C. Preservation League sought preservation status for the house based on the historical significance of its former occupants. The D.C. Preservation League specifically chose to seek preservation status for the house in an effort to preserve history of under represented communities. It was listed on the National Register of Historic Places in 2020, and was designated a National Historic Landmark in 2024.

== See also ==
- National Register of Historic Places listings in Washington, D.C.
- Lucy Diggs Slowe
- Mary P. Burrill
- Dr. Franklin E. Kameny House
- The Furies Collective
