= Central Square Theater =

Coordinates: 42.3636°N 71.1010°W

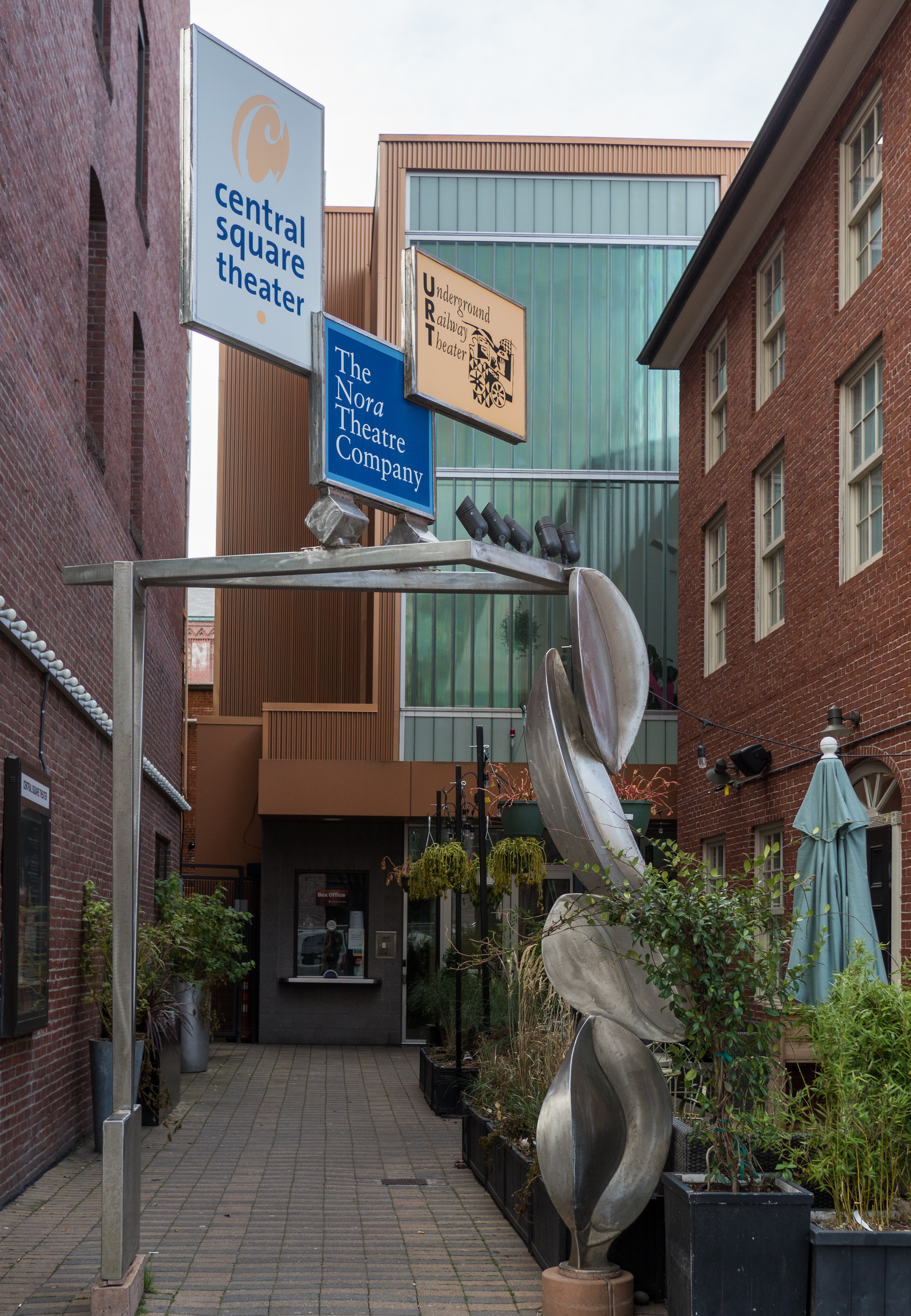
- Interactive map of Central Square Theater
- Address: 450 Massachusetts Avenue
- Location: Cambridge, Massachusetts, U.S.
- Event: Non-profit theater

Construction
- Opened: 2008

Website
- centralsquaretheater.org

Central Square Theater is a non-profit theater located at 450 Massachusetts Avenue in Cambridge, Massachusetts in the United States of America. It features a 200-seat black box main stage and a 50-seat studio theater.

Development of the theater began in the late 1990s, when MIT began to consider options for renovating deteriorating buildings it owned on Massachusetts Avenue, including a café and a convenient store. With the help of the Cambridge Historical Commission, the Institute developed a plan to replicate aspects of the original structure and develop a black box theater and retail and office space.

It is a collaboration of two separate theater companies—Underground Railway Theater, founded in 1976 in Oberlin, Ohio, and the Nora Theatre Company, founded in 1988 by Mary C. Huntington. With support from the Boston Foundation Arts Fund, the two companies combined forces and moved into the state-of-the-art Central Square Theater in 2008. They continue to maintain their distinct identities.

The two companies together produce over 200 performances per year and reach an audiences of over 25,000 people. The Boston Foundation has cited Central Square Theater as "one of the organizations that has contributed to making Greater Boston one of the most culturally rich cities in the world".

As of 2013, the artistic director of the Nora Theatre was Lee Mikeska Gardner. The artistic director of Underground Railway Theater is Debra Wise.
