= Deborah C. Jackson =

Academic administrator and nonprofit executive

- Born: 1952 (age 73–74)
- Education: Hampton Institute, Northeastern University
- Alma mater: Massachusetts Institute of Technology
- Occupations: Academic administrator and nonprofit executive
- Organization: Cambridge College

Deborah C. Jackson is an academic administrator and nonprofit executive.

== Education ==
Jackson began her studies at Hampton Institute in Hampton, Virginia, and then transferred to Northeastern University, where she completed her undergraduate studies. Jackson received a masters in urban planning from Massachusetts Institute of Technology.

== Career ==
Jackson was the president of Cambridge College from 2011 to 2023. Before that, she was the CEO of the American Red Cross in Eastern Massachusetts. Jackson was also a leader in human and health services as the vice president of the Boston Foundation, the vice president of Boston's Children Hospital and CEO of Goodwill Industries. Jackson has also served on the board of several university boards including Roxbury Community College, Northeastern University Corporation and Boston College Carroll School of Management Advisory Board among others.

Jackson has served as co-chair of the Mayor's task force to Eliminate Racial and Ethnic Disparities in Healthcare and served on the transition committee for former Governor Deval Patrick.

== Honors and awards ==
Jackson was noted as one of the city's 100 most influential leaders by Boston Business Journal. She was inducted into the Greater Boston Chamber of Commerce's Academy of Distinguished Bostonians. In 2023, she was recognized as one of "Boston's most admired, beloved, and successful Black Women leaders" by the Black Women Lead project.
