= Mary P. Burrill =

American dramatist

- Born: Mary Powell Burrill; August , 1881; Washington, D.C., US
- Died: March 13, 1946 (aged 64); New York, US
- Education: Emerson College
- Occupations: Playwright, educator
- Partner: Lucy Diggs Slowe
- Relatives: Clara Burrill Bruce (sister); Roscoe Conkling Bruce (brother-in-law)
- Writing career
- Genre: Drama
- Notable works: They That Sit in Darkness (1919); Aftermath (1919)

Mary Powell Burrill (August 1881 – March 13, 1946) was an early 20th-century African-American female playwright of the Harlem Renaissance, who inspired Willis Richardson and other students to write plays. Burrill herself wrote plays about the Black Experience, their literary and cultural activities, and the Black Elite. She featured the kind of central figures as were prominent in the black society of Washington, D.C., and others who contributed to black women's education in early twentieth century.

== Early life ==
Mary Powell Burrill was born in August 1881 in Washington, D.C., the daughter of John Henry Burrill and Clara Eliza Washington Burrill. In 1901, she graduated from M Street High School (later Dunbar High School) in Washington, D.C., which was one of the leading black academic, secondary schools in the country at the time. During Burrill's adolescence and early adulthood, she had an emotional and possibly erotic relationship with Angelina Weld Grimké, which allowed Burrill to encourage her to pursue playwriting as she would later become a famous poet, playwright and teacher.

Burrill's family later moved to Boston, Massachusetts. There she attended Emerson College of Oratory (later Emerson College), where she received a diploma in 1904.

== Career ==
After graduation, Burrill returned to Washington, D.C. From 1905 until her retirement in 1944, she taught English, history, and drama at Dunbar High School, her alma mater, and Armstrong High. For thirty-eight years, Burrill also gave dramatic readings and directed plays and musical productions at Dunbar and throughout Washington, D.C.

Some of Burrill's students became educators and writers who were actively involved in the Harlem Renaissance. Among these was Willis Richardson, the first African-American dramatist to have a play produced on Broadway in New York City. Another notable student was May Miller, who published her first play, Pandora's Box, while she was still a student at Dunbar.

In 1919, two of Burrill's most well-known plays were published. They That Sit in Darkness was published in Margaret Sanger's progressive Birth Control Review, a monthly publication advocating reproductive rights for women. The other play, Aftermath, was published in The Liberator, edited by socialist Max Eastman. Burrill's plays were considered protest plays because they advocated progressive stances on issues of race and gender. Burrill hosted literary gatherings in her home, which was known as “the Half-Way House.” It served as a meeting space for creative expression and intellectual discussions among many prominent writers and artists of the Harlem Renaissance. For example, she was a friend of Jean Toomer, who had ties in Washington, and Georgia Douglas Johnson. Burill even participated in the gatherings held at Johnson's S Street Salon, where female activists of the Harlem Renaissance would gather to discuss lynchings, women's rights, and the hardships facing African-American families.

=== They That Sit in Darkness ===
This one-act play written in 1919 focuses on the difficulties faced by working-class black families with numerous children. Malinda Jasper, a 38-year-old woman, works full-time and also takes care of her 10 children, her husband never sees their children because they are asleep when he gets home from his job. She dies of physical and mental exhaustion, forcing her 17-year-old daughter to take care of the family rather than go to college as she planned, a result that continues the cycle of poverty for her and her siblings. Through Malinda's story, the play explores how legal restrictions that limited women's access to reproductive rights affected their welfare and that of their families. It was part of a campaign to legalize birth control, but this did not become legal until March 22, 1972. Burrill's work was controversial because it advocated birth control as a means to escape poverty long before women were given reproductive rights in the U.S. The play also features a southern dialect adopted by many former slaves which playwrights incorporated as a means to assimilate work with previously dictated guidelines for what "black theatre" was. In Burrill's work, she reclaims this accent in the empowerment of her characters throughout the length of the play.

=== Aftermath ===
This play is set in rural South Carolina and features John, an African-American soldier who discovers after returning home from World War I that his father has been lynched. The play was produced by New York City's Krigwa Players in 1928. John had been awarded the French War Cross for single-handedly fighting off twenty German soldiers, and so saving the lives of everyone in his company. Aftermath (1919) was considered political because Burrill's portrayed John as a black male who selflessly and fearlessly confronted racial oppression. The production of the piece took place in New York City and the Little Black Theatre performed by the Krigwa Players.

== Personal life ==
Mary Burrill was attracted to others of the same gender, at a time when this was discouraged. She sought to prevent her orientation from affecting her social positions, and her acceptance in African-American society.

When she was 15, it appears that Mary Burrill had a dalliance with fellow Washingtonian Angelina Weld Grimke, who penned this note:

"I know you are too young now to become my wife, but I hope, darling, that in a few years you will come to me and be my love, my wife! How my brain whirls how my pulse leaps with joy and madness when I think of these two words, 'my wife'"

In 1912, while teaching, Burrill met Lucy Diggs Slowe, an English teacher from Baltimore. After a few years, Slowe moved to DC to teach at Armstrong Manual Training Academy. She and Burrill bought a house together. Slowe and Burrill were together for twenty-five years, and their close friends, who were mostly other black female educators, treated them as a couple.

Slowe was appointed in 1922 as Dean of Women at Howard University, a historically black college; she was the first black dean of women there or at any American university. She and Burrill decided to buy a house at 1256 Kearney Street in nearby Brookland, then a predominantly white middle-class neighborhood in Northeast Washington. They lived there for fifteen years until Slowe died in 1937 from kidney disease.

== Death and legacy ==
Shattered from the death of Slowe, Burrill moved out of their house and into an apartment near Howard. She retired from Dunbar High School in 1944. Upon her retirement from teaching in 1944, Burrill moved to New York City, where she died on March 13, 1946, in her early 60s. She is buried at Woodlawn Cemetery in Washington, D.C.

The Slowe-Burrill House was listed on the National Register of Historic Places in 2020.
