= May Miller =

American writer

- Portrait c. 1940
- Born: January 26, 1899; Washington, D.C.
- Died: February 8, 1995 (aged 96); Washington, D.C.
- Education: Howard University, The American University, Columbia University
- Alma mater: Howard University
- Occupations: Poet and playwright
- Writing career
- Notable works: Play: The Bog Guide, 1925. Poem: Inauguration of US President Jimmy Carter, 1977.
- Movement: Harlem Renaissance

May Miller (January 26, 1899 – February 8, 1995) was an American poet, playwright and educator. Miller, who was African-American, became known as the most widely published female playwright of the Harlem Renaissance and had seven volumes of poetry published during her career as a writer.

== Early life ==
May Miller was born in Washington, D.C., to Kelly and Anna May Miller, one of the Millers' five children. Her father, Kelly Miller, was the professor and founder of the department of sociology at Howard University. Her house which was located in the Howard University campus was a gathering place for the black intellectuals and artists such as W.E.B DuBois, Booker T. Washington, and Langston Hughes. May Miller graduated from Howard University in 1920 and became a play-writer and poet. She won an award for her play Within the Shadow (1920) and The Bog Guide (1925). The award-winning play that placed third in the Opportunity magazine contest that was primarily read by African Americans helped plant her in the Black cultural scene and the Harlem Renaissance. She wrote historical plays in the 1930s and taught English at high school in Baltimore for 20 years. Miller was an active member of S Street Salon hosted by Georgia Douglas Johnson. S Street Salon was Johnson's house at 1461 S Street NW, Washington, DC, and she held a meeting for black artists and writers every Saturday for 40 years which also known as "Saturday Salon".

== Career ==
Miller began writing poetry at an early age, buying a pair of earrings with her first earnings. While attending Dunbar High School Miller studied under the writers Mary P. Burrill and Angelina Weld Grimke. She began attending Howard University at the age of 16 in 1916. While attending college, Miller developed an interest in promoting and performing plays written by African-American writers. She graduated in 1920, and later won an award for her play Within the Shadows.

While in college, May was a part of the Alpha Phi Literary Society and Alpha Kappa Alpha.

May Miller's entry into the cultural scene of the Harlem Renaissance began with the publishing of her play The Bog Guide in 1925. Her work claimed third place in the play category for Opportunity magazine's Literary Prize Contest in 1925. Miller sought through her writing to portray black people with a level of respect and dignity that had been absent in drama. Inspired by the work of the Chicago Imagists and Archibald Macleish, Miller turned her writing towards poetry in the 1940s.

Miller encouraged the writer, Zora Neale Hurston to attend Howard University, instead of Morgan University. Miller did graduate work in poetry and drama at The American University and Columbia University, followed by twenty years teaching English and speech at Frederick Douglass High School, in Baltimore, Maryland. She was motivated to tell the stories of black history and black heroes to the children in her classroom, and wrote a great deal herself for that purpose. Miller also lectured at Monmouth College, University of Wisconsin–Milwaukee, and Phillips Exeter Academy. Her plays included historical dramas about Sojourner Truth and Harriet Tubman; she also wrote plays in the feminist, folk, and genteel genres.

In the 1970s, she publicly read her poetry at several high-profile celebrations, including the inauguration of President Jimmy Carter in 1977.

== Selected works ==
Poetry

- Into the Clearing. Washington, D.C.: Charioteer Press, 1959.
- Poems. Thetford, Vt: Cricket Press, 1962.
- Lyrics of Three Women. With Katie L. Lyle and Maude Rubin. Baltimore: Linden Press, 1964.
- Not That Far. San Luis Obispo: Solo Press, 1973. ISBN 978-0-941490-12-2.
- The Clearing and Beyond. Washington, D.C.: Charioteer Press, 1974. ISBN 0910350086.
- Dust of Uncertain Journey. Detroit: Lotus Press, 1975. ISBN 9780916418052.
- Halfway to the Sun. Washington, D.C.: Washington Writers Publishing House, 1981. ISBN 093184617X.
- The Ransomed Wait. Detroit: Lotus Press, 1983. ISBN 978-0-916418-40-3.
- Collected Poems. Detroit: Lotus Press, 1989. ISBN 978-0-916418-70-0.

Plays

- The Bog Guide. Alexandria, Virginia: Alexander Street Press, 2003. (Original work published in 1925.)
- Scratches. Alexandria, VA: Alexander Street Press, 2003. (Original work published in 1929.)
- Stragglers in the Dust. Alexandria, VA: Alexander Street Press, 2001. (Original work published in 1930.)
- Nails and Thorns. Alexandria, VA: Alexander Street Press, 2001. (Original work published in 1933.)

== See also ==
- Harlem Renaissance
- Kelly Miller
