= Anna Faith Johnson Jones =

American community activist

Anna Faith Johnson Jones is an American community activist who was the first Black woman to lead a major community foundation.

== Early life and education ==
Jones is the youngest child of Howard University's first Black president, Mordecai Wyatt Johnson.

Jones graduated from Wellesley College in 1954 with a bachelors in music history. She went on to study musicology at Columbia University, graduating with her master's degree in 1956.

== Community work ==
Prior to her work at the Boston Foundation, Jones worked as a real estate broker and a music librarian at MIT.

Jones joined The Boston Foundation in 1974. She served as assistant director and later as associate director. In 1985, she was named president of the foundation, becoming the first Black woman to lead a major community foundation, and she held that leadership role until 2001.

In 1985, Jones was appointed as a board member for the Bank of New England. In 1998, Jones was elected chair of the Board of Directors of the Council on Foundations. She also served as a Senior Director for the NAACP Legal Defense Fund.

The Anna Faith Jones and Frieda Garcia Women of Color Leadership Circle, a program run by the Boston Women's Fund, was inspired by Jones and Garcia and named in their honor.

== Awards ==
- Honorary Doctor of Humane Letters degree from University of Massachusetts, Boston 1986
- Wellesley College Alumnae Achievement Award 1994
- Honorary Doctor of Humane Letters degree from Boston College 1999
- YW Boston Academy of Women Achievers 2000
- Anna Faith Jones Arts Fund (2000) part of the Boston Foundation's Arts Fund, recognizing and honoring the leadership and service of Anna Faith Jones and her special commitment to supporting the arts
- Council on Federations - Distinguished Service Award 2001
- Greater Boston Chamber of Commerce Pinnacle Lifetime Achievement Award
