= Blanche Bruce =

American politician (1841–1898)

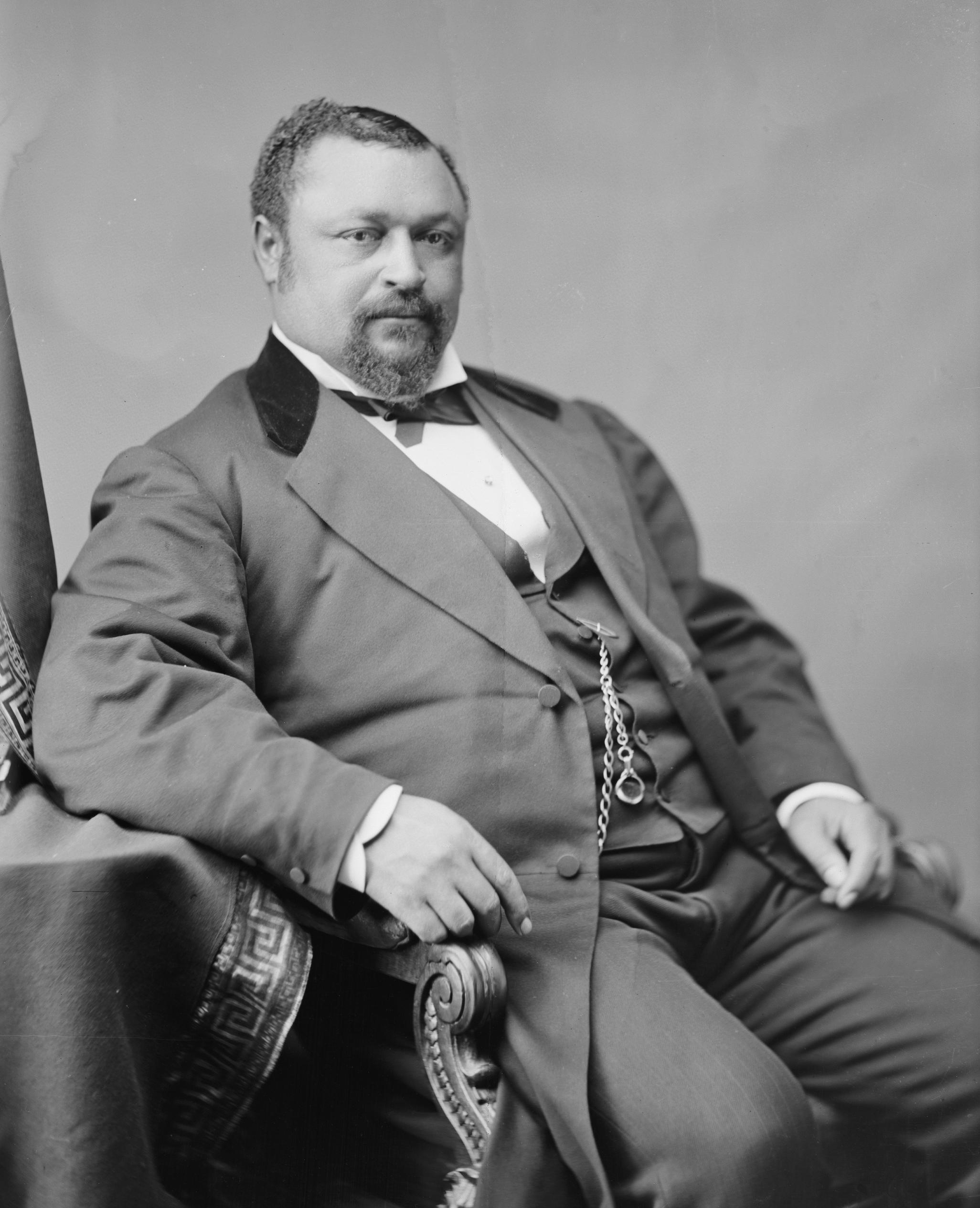
- Portrait by Brady c. 1875–80

6th and 9th Register of the Treasury
- In office December 3, 1897 – March 17, 1898
- President: William McKinley
- Preceded by: Fount Tillman
- Succeeded by: Judson Lyons
- In office May 21, 1881 – June 5, 1885
- President: James A. Garfield; Chester A. Arthur; Grover Cleveland
- Preceded by: Glenni Scofield
- Succeeded by: William Rosecrans

Recorder of Deeds for the District of Columbia
- In office February 7, 1890 – May 26, 1894
- Appointed by: Benjamin Harrison
- Preceded by: James Monroe Trotter
- Succeeded by: C. H. J. Taylor

United States Senator from Mississippi
- In office March 4, 1875 – March 3, 1881
- Preceded by: Henry R. Pease
- Succeeded by: James Z. George

Personal details
- Born: Blanche Kelso Bruce; March 1, 1841 Farmville, Virginia, U.S.
- Died: March 17, 1898 (aged 57) Washington, D.C., U.S.
- Resting place: Woodlawn Cemetery
- Party: Republican
- Spouse: Josephine Willson
- Children: Roscoe
- Education: Oberlin College (attended)
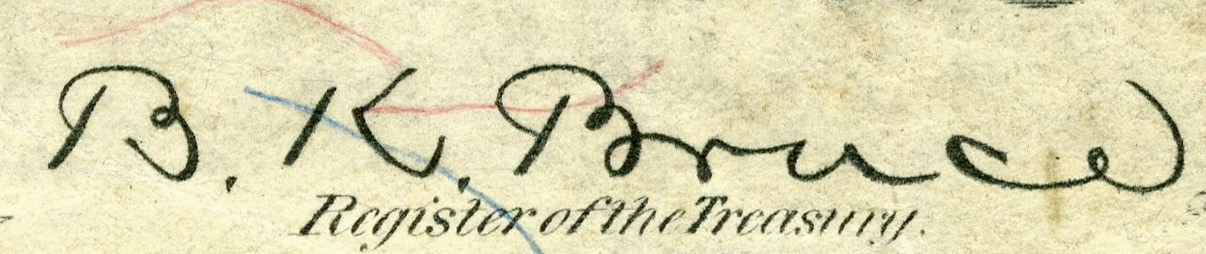
- Signature

Blanche Kelso Bruce (March 1, 1841 – March 17, 1898) was an American politician who represented Mississippi as a Republican in the United States Senate from 1875 to 1881. Born into slavery in Prince Edward County, Virginia, he became the second African American senator, after fellow Mississippian Hiram R. Revels, and the first to serve a full term. He was the last African American to serve in the Senate until Edward Brooke of Massachusetts was elected in 1966, and the last from Mississippi until Scott Colom was elected in 2026.

Bruce was later appointed Register of the Treasury by president James A. Garfield, serving from 1881 to 1885; he became the first African American to have his signature featured on U.S. paper currency. He was also the Recorder of Deeds for the District of Columbia by Benjamin Harrison, serving from 1890 to 1894, and again Register of the Treasury by William McKinley, serving from 1897 until his death in 1898. His home, the Blanche K. Bruce House, is a National Historic Landmark.

== Early life and education ==
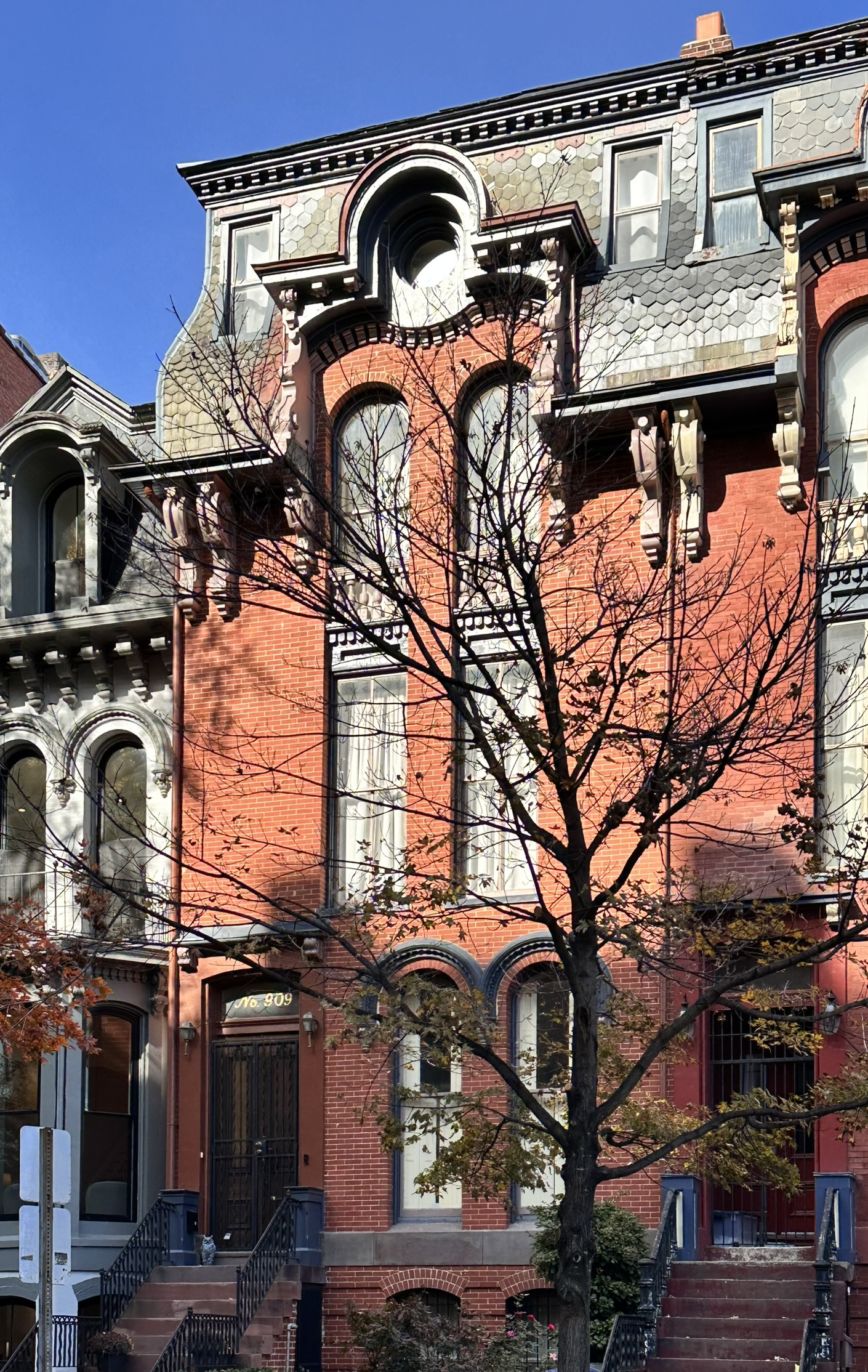
Bruce's house at 909 M Street NW in Washington, D.C. was declared a National Historic Landmark in 1975

Bruce was born into slavery in 1841 in Prince Edward County, Virginia, near Farmville to Polly Bruce, an African American woman who served as a domestic slave. His father was his master, Pettis Perkinson, a white Virginia planter. Bruce was treated comparatively well by his father, who educated him together with a legitimate half-brother. When Bruce was young, he played with his half-brother. One source claims that his father legally freed Blanche and arranged for an apprenticeship so he could learn a trade. In an 1886 newspaper interview, however, Bruce says that he gained his freedom by moving to Kansas as soon as hostilities broke out in the American Civil War.

== Career ==
Bruce attended Oberlin College for two years in Oberlin, Ohio. He next worked as a steamboat porter on the Mississippi River. In 1864, he moved to Hannibal, Missouri, where he established a school for black children.

In 1868, during Reconstruction, Bruce relocated to Bolivar near Cleveland in northwestern Mississippi, where he purchased a Mississippi Delta plantation. He became a wealthy landowner of several thousand acres in the Mississippi Delta. He was appointed to the positions of Tallahatchie County registrar of voters and tax assessor before he won an election for sheriff in Bolivar County. He later was elected to other county positions, including tax collector and supervisor of education, while he also edited a local newspaper. He became sergeant-at-arms for the Mississippi State Senate in 1870.

Bruce's U.S. Senate credentials, signed by Mississippi governor Adelbert Ames, 1874

In February 1874, Bruce was elected to the U.S. Senate by the Mississippi legislature, the second African American to serve in the upper house of Congress. On February 14, 1879, Bruce presided over the U.S. Senate, becoming the first African American (and the only former slave) to have done so. In 1880, James Z. George, a Confederate Army veteran and member of the Democratic Party, was elected to succeed Bruce. After his Senate term expired, Bruce remained in Washington, D.C., secured a succession of Republican patronage jobs and stumped for Republican candidates across the country. He acquired a large townhouse and summer home, and presided over black high society.

At the 1880 Republican National Convention in Chicago, Bruce became the first African American to win any votes for national office at a major party's nominating convention, with eight votes for vice president. The presidential nominee that year was Ohio's James A. Garfield, who narrowly won election over the Democrat Winfield Scott Hancock.

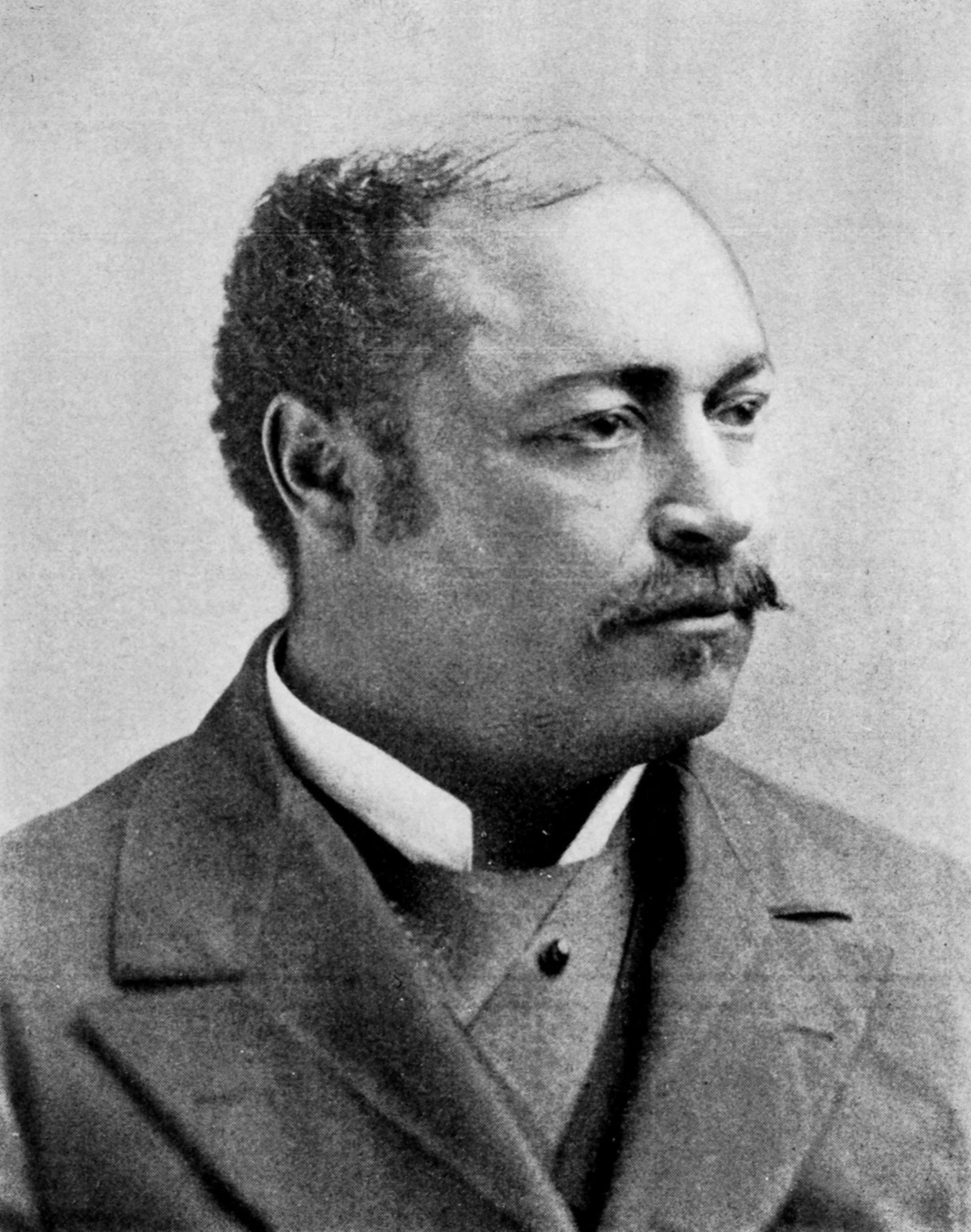
Bruce c. 1884

In 1881, Bruce was appointed by President Garfield as Register of the Treasury. He was the first African American to have his signature featured on U.S. paper currency.

In early 1889, politically connected blacks lobbied for Bruce to receive a Cabinet appointment in the Harrison administration. Said one newspaper: "Bruce is a man of respectable ability, and has, perhaps, more than any other man of his race who has sat in Congress, the respect of those with whom he served.

Bruce served by appointment as the District of Columbia recorder of deeds from 1890 to 1894. A Philadelphia newspaper reported his appointment in 1890, but persistent claims that his salary was $30,000 a year are not substantiated by any primary records. He also served on the District of Columbia Board of Trustees of Public Schools from 1892 to 1895. He was a participant in the March 5, 1897 meeting to celebrate the memory of Frederick Douglass and the American Negro Academy led by Alexander Crummell. He was appointed as Register of the Treasury a second time in 1897 by President William McKinley and served until his death from diabetes complications in 1898.

== Personal life ==
On June 24, 1878, Bruce married Josephine Beall Willson (1853–1923), a socialite of Cleveland, Ohio, amid great publicity; the couple traveled to Europe for a four-month honeymoon. Their only child, Roscoe Conkling Bruce, was born in 1879. He was named for U.S. Senator Roscoe Conkling of New York, Bruce's mentor in the Senate.

One newspaper wrote that Bruce did not approve of the designation "colored men." He often said, "I am a Negro and proud of it."

== Honors and legacy ==
In July 1898, the District of Columbia public school trustees ordered that a then-new public school building on Marshall Street in Park View be named the Bruce School in his honor.

In 1975, the Washington, D.C. residence of Bruce, was declared a National Historic Landmark and formally named The Blanche K. Bruce House.

In October 1999, the U.S. Senate commissioned a portrait of Bruce. African-American Washington D.C. artist Simmie Knox was selected in 2000 to paint the portrait, based on a photograph by Mathew Brady; it was unveiled in the Capitol in 2001.

Blanche Bruce is listed in Molefi Kete Asante's book 100 Greatest African Americans (2002).

On March 1, 2006, the African American Heritage Preservation Foundation unveiled a historical highway marker noting Bruce's birthplace at the intersection of highway 360 and 623 near Green Bay, Prince Edward County, Virginia.

Lawrence Otis Graham authored a historical book about Bruce titled The True Story of America's First Black Dynasty: The Senator and the Socialite in June 2006.

Bruce was portrayed by Barry Shabaka Henley in Death By Lightning, a 2025 Netflix mini-series on the presidency and assassination of James Garfield.

== See also ==
- List of African-American United States senators
- List of African-American United States Senate candidates

== Bibliography ==
- Graham, Lawrence Otis (2006). The Senator and the Socialite: The True Story of America's First Black Dynasty. New York: Harper Collins. ISBN 978-0060985134.
- Harris, William C. (1982). "Blanche K. Bruce of Mississippi: Conservative Assimilationist". In Rabinowitz, Howard N. (ed.). Southern Black Leaders of the Reconstruction Era. Urbana: University of Illinois Press. pp. 1–38. ISBN 0252009290.
- Patler, Nicholas (2012). "The Black 'Consummate Strategist': Blanche Kelso Bruce and the Skillful Use of Power in the Reconstruction and Post-Reconstruction Eras". In Lynch, Matthew (ed.). Before Obama: A Reappraisal of the Black Reconstruction Era Politicians. Santa Barbara, CA: Praeger. pp. 23–46. ISBN 978-0313397929.
- Patler, Nicholas (Summer 2009). "A Black Vice President in the Gilded Age? Blanche Kelso Bruce and the National Republican Convention of 1880". Journal of Mississippi History. 71. Jackson: Mississippi Department of Archives and History: 105–138. ISSN 0022-2771.

U.S. Senate
Preceded by Henry R. Pease	United States Senator (Class 1) from Mississippi; 1875–1881; Served alongside: James L. Alcorn, Lucius Lamar	Succeeded by James Z. George
New office	Chair of the Senate Mississippi River Levees Committee; 1877–1879	Succeeded by ???
Honorary titles
Preceded by Stephen Wallace Dorsey	Baby of the Senate; 1879–1881	Succeeded by Arthur Pue Gorman
Political offices
Preceded by Glenni Scofield	Register of the Treasury; 1881–1885	Succeeded by William Rosecrans
Preceded by Fount Tillman	Register of the Treasury; 1897–1898	Succeeded by Judson Lyons
