= Lucy Diggs Slowe =

American educator and athlete

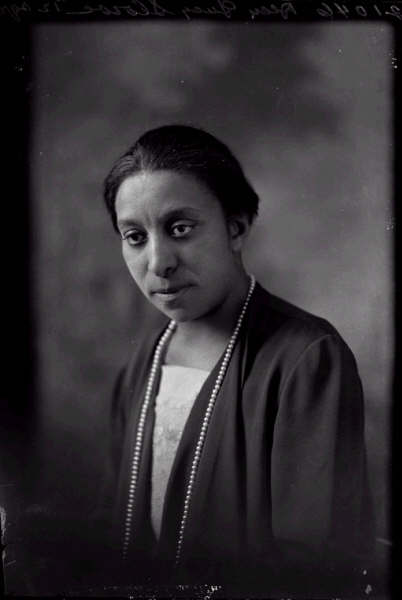
- Born: July 4, 1883; Berryville, Virginia, U.S.
- Died: October 21, 1937 (aged 52); Washington, D.C., U.S.
- Occupations: educator, college dean, and tennis champion, founder of Alpha Kappa Alpha sorority;
- Partner: Mary P. Burrill
- Parent(s): Henry Slowe and Fannie Potter

Lucy Diggs Slowe (July 4, 1883 – October 21, 1937) was an American educator and athlete, and the first Black woman to serve as Dean of Women at any American university. She was a founder of Alpha Kappa Alpha sorority, the first sorority founded by African-American women.

Slowe was a tennis champion, winning the national title of the American Tennis Association's first tournament in 1917, the first African-American woman to win a major sports title. In 1922, Slowe was appointed the first Dean of Women at Howard University. She continued in that role for 15 years until her death. In addition, Slowe created and led two professional associations to support college administrators.

== Early life and education ==
Lucy Diggs Slowe was born in Berryville, Virginia to Henry Slowe and Fannie Potter Slowe. While various sources put her birth year as 1885, others have said 1883. She was one of seven children. Her father's occupation has been reported as a hotel operator, restaurant proprietor and farmer. He died before Lucy turned one and her mother died shortly after. Following her mother's death, Lucy and her sister Charlotte were raised by her aunt Martha Price in Lexington, Virginia. At thirteen, Lucy and her family moved to Baltimore, Maryland, where she attended the Baltimore Colored High and Training School. She graduated second in her class in 1904, receiving one of the two-sponsored scholarships to Howard from the Baltimore City School Board

Slowe was the first person from her school to attend Howard University, the top historically black college in the nation, at a time when only 1/3 of 1% of African Americans and 5% of whites of eligible age attended any college.

After graduation in 1908, Slowe returned to Baltimore to teach English in high school. During the summers, she started studying at Columbia University in New York, where she earned her Masters of Arts degree in 1915.

Slowe is buried in the Lincoln Memorial Cemetery in Suitland, Maryland.

== Career ==
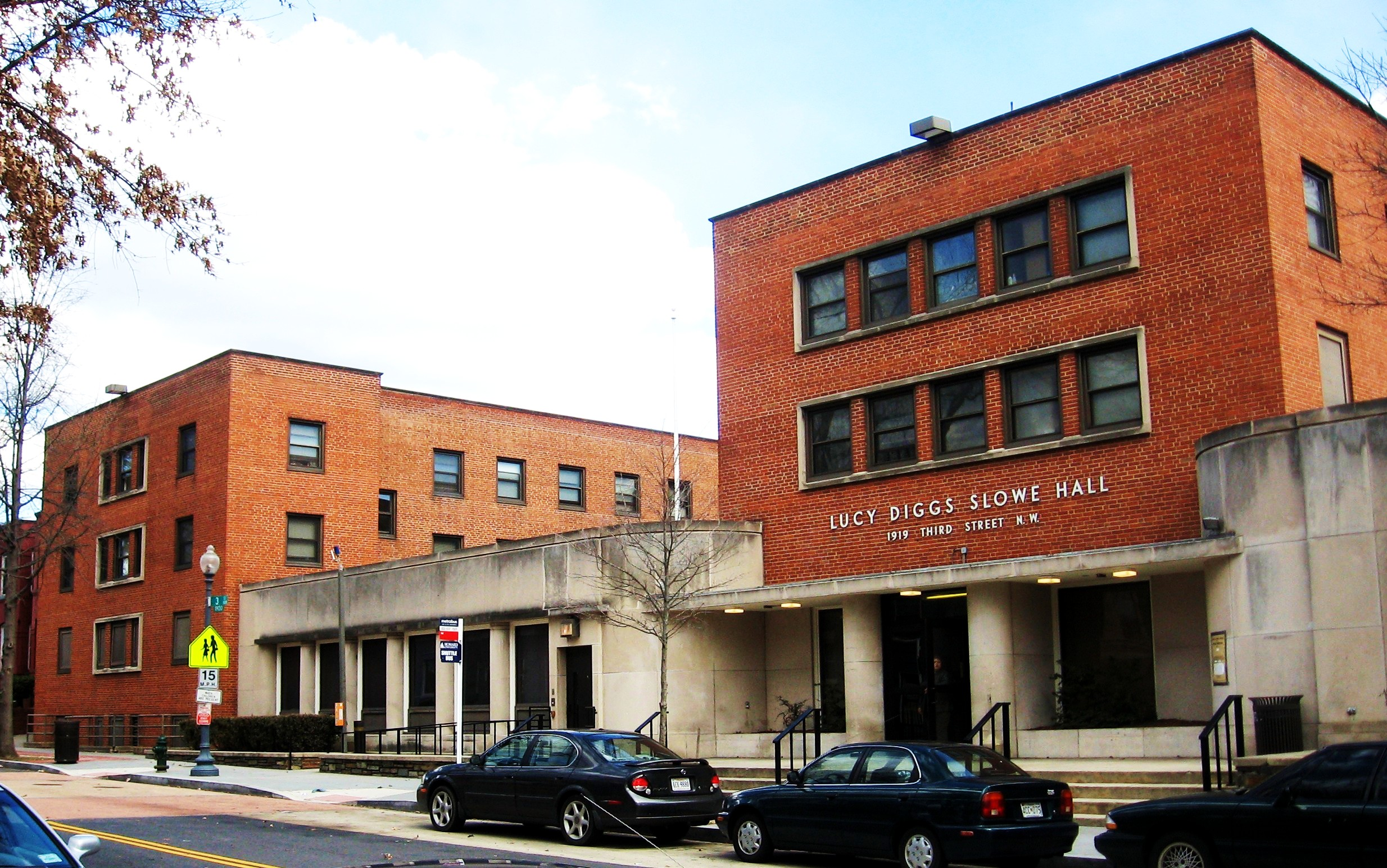
An image of the former Slowe Hall. The building was located on 3rd and T Street on the Howard University campus. The building was designed by Louis Justement.

After earning her M.A. she returned to Washington, DC to teach. Because the District was run as part of the Federal government, African-American teachers in the public schools were part of the civil service and paid on the same scale as European Americans. The system attracted outstanding teachers, especially for Dunbar High School, the academic high school for African Americans. In 1919, the District of Columbia asked Lucy Slowe to create the first junior high school in its system for blacks and then appointed her as principal. She led Shaw junior high school until 1922, creating the first integrated in-service training for junior high school teachers in the District. In 1917, Slowe won the American Tennis Association's first tournament. She was the first African-American woman to win a major sports title.

In 1922, Howard University selected Lucy Slowe as its first Dean of Women. Slowe was the first African-American female to serve in that position at any university in the United States. As Dean of Women at Howard University, she imparted her vision of training women for the modern world. According to Slowe's writings, she defined the modern world as a place where all people “strove for professional achievement and personal fulfillment.” Slowe took major professional risks to implicate sexual harassment against female students by male faculty members. In 1927, she composed a memo regarding a parent's concerns over a professor's vulgar and "improper" language. This was one of the first written sexual assault cases involving Black women. After advocating for the female students, Slowe's relationship with male faculty members was difficult for the remainder of her time at Howard.

In addition to being Dean of Women, Slowe was a faculty member of the English department. Slowe continued to serve as a college administrator at Howard for the rest of her career, until her death on October 21, 1937.

== Activism ==
Lucy Diggs Slowe was one of the nine original founders of Alpha Kappa Alpha Sorority, Incorporated at Howard University. She was instrumental in drafting the sorority's constitution. She also served as the chapter's first president.

Slowe has been active in both local and national political scenes. She was a member of the DuBois Circle, a Black women's group that met to discuss current issues and the arts.

She also founded both the National Association of College Women, which she led for several years as first president, and the Association of Advisors to Women in Colored Schools.

== Personal life ==
Slowe met Mary P. Burrill, a playwright and fellow educator, in 1912. After Slowe moved to DC, the two women bought a house together. They were a couple for 25 years, but they hid their romantic relationship from all but their close friends. After Slowe was appointed Dean of Women at Howard, they purchased a house in nearby Brookland, where they lived for 15 years until Slowe's death. The Slowe-Burrill House was listed on the National Register of Historic Places in 2020.

== Honors ==
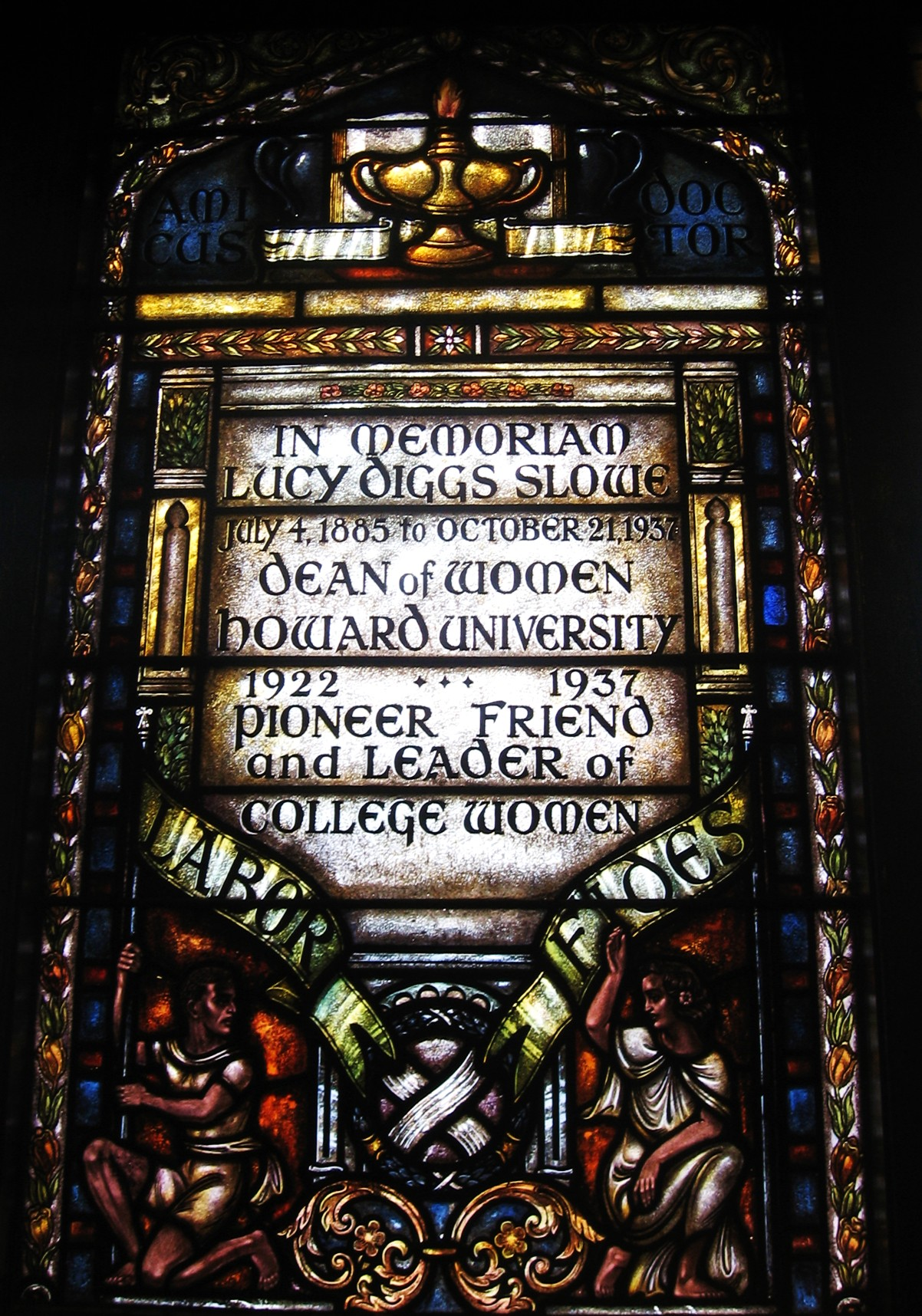
Window inside of Rankin Chapel at Howard University

- In 1942, the United States government built a dormitory to house African-American female government workers, as housing in the city was extremely crowded because of new workers for the war effort. After World War II, the government transferred the building to Howard University for use as a dormitory. Named Lucy Diggs Slowe Hall in her honor, it opened in 1943. Located at 1919 Third Street NW, the hall today is operated by Howard as a co-ed residence.
- The District of Columbia named an elementary school in Northeast DC after her. (It closed in 2008 and was re-opened as a charter school named for Mary McLeod Bethune).
- In 1986, the 70th convention of the National Association of Women Deans, Administrators and Counselors' formally recognized Slowe's contributions. It presented a plaque dedicated to her to hang at its headquarters in Washington, DC.
- Slowe was featured among the women champions of the exhibit Breaking the Barriers: The ATA and Black Tennis Pioneers, sponsored by the International Tennis Hall of Fame and Museum from August 25 to September 9, 2007.
- In 2015, the First Street Tunnel project named its Tunnel Boring Machine "Lucy" in honor of Slowe.
- In 2017, the Virginia Department of Historic Resources erected a historic marker dedicated to Slowe in her hometown of Berryville.
