= Roscoe Conkling Bruce =

American educator

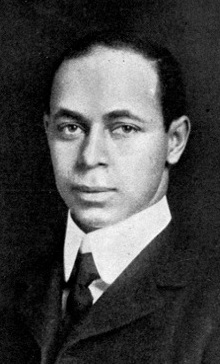
- Born: 21 April 1879; Washington, D.C., U.S.
- Died: 16 August 1950 (aged 71); New York City, New York, U.S.
- Occupation: Educator
- Known for: Emphasis on industrial training for African Americans
- Spouse: Clara Burrill Bruce (married 1903)
- Parents: Blanche Bruce (father); Josephine Beall Willson Bruce (mother)

Roscoe Conkling Bruce, Senior (21 April 1879 – 16 August 1950) was an African-American educator who was known for stressing the value of practical industrial and business skills as opposed to academic disciplines. Later he administered the Dunbar Apartments housing complex in Harlem, New York City, and was editor in chief of the Harriet Tubman Publishing Company.

== Birth and education ==
Roscoe Conkling Bruce was born on 21 April 1879 in Washington, D.C., the only son of U.S. Senator Blanche Bruce and his wife Josephine Beall Willson Bruce. His father was a Republican from Mississippi. Blanche Bruce was a former slave, the second African American to be elected to the U.S. Senate, and the first to serve a full six-year term. Josephine Beall Willson was the daughter of a Cleveland dentist. She had been an elementary school teacher. In 1899 Booker T. Washington hired her as lady principal at the Tuskegee Institute. In 1901 she ran unsuccessfully for election as President of the National Association of Colored Women.

Roscoe Conkling was their only child. He was named after Senator Roscoe Conkling of New York, who supported his father against anti-black prejudice in the Senate chamber. His secondary education was first at Washington's M Street High School and then at Phillips Exeter Academy, where he was one of the editors of The Exonian, the student newspaper. He went on to Harvard University in 1898. At Harvard in 1898 he won the Pasteur Medal for debating, in 1899 was chosen as one of three men to represent Harvard in a debate against Princeton University, in 1900 represented Harvard in the oratorical contest against Yale University and won the Coolidge debating prize. He graduated with an AB degree in 1902, magna cum laude, and became a member of Phi Beta Kappa society.

== Educator ==
While visiting Josephine at Tuskegee, during the summer break of his senior year at Harvard, Bruce won a fan in Booker T. Washington and secured a position at Tuskegee as head of the Academic Department. Washington demoted James Dickens McCall to open the position for Bruce.

From 1902 to 1906 Bruce supervised the Academic Department of Tuskegee Institute and also taught classes. He had been hired by Washington to change the curriculum to become less academic and emphasize more practical skills, a change that was unpopular with the faculty and the students. Bruce advised Washington to expand Tuskegee to other countries, such as South Africa. He also eliminated music and Bible study courses, and threatened to eliminate other academic courses if the teachers did not "appreciably ... diminish the amount of time required of his students for the preparation of his subjects". He wanted Tuskegee to become "a first class industrial school rather than a second class academic".

After expressing desire to move into the Washington D.C. Schools, Bruce asked Washington to help him secure a position. At the time, W.E.B. Du Bois was making an effort to become the superintendent of schools in that area, which Washington greatly opposed due to their differing philosophies. So, Washington actively lobbied for Bruce to receive the position, consorting with Mary Church Terrell, a black District school board member, to lobby behind-the-scenes for the appointment of Bruce. And, following Washington's active campaign for him, Bruce became the supervising principal of a district, controlling one quarter of the black schools in 1906. Just a few months after his appointment, he was promoted to Assistant Superintendent in charge of the Colored Schools of the District of Columbia.

Bruce felt that industrial and business education were important, and tried to convert the school into a technical high school. He demanded that every student at the Dunbar High School take at least one industrial course. A boys' and a girls' vocational school were established on his recommendation. He supported reorganization of the Washington D.C. school system under the Congressional Organic Act of 1906, which gave control of the public school to a board of education whose members were appointed by the Supreme Court of the District of Columbia and who served three-year terms without pay.

In July 1921, Bruce resigned from his position amid a controversy arising from nude photographs taken of black students as part of an ethnological study (see below.)

Following his resignation, he took charge of a project to organize high schools for African American children in Kimball, West Virginia and later became principal of Kimball's Browns Creek District High School.

== Relationship with other African Americans ==
Bruce found the pentecostal worship practiced by lower-class Tuskegee students "disgusting".

Even though he had received an elite academic education, Bruce's philosophy of industrial training in Washington D.C.'s black schools, caused an uproar among black parents proud of their children's educational attainments. However, Booker T. Washington's support, and a white-dominated school board, secured Bruce's position.

Bruce endured a tug-of-war for power within the D.C. education circles and became the focal point of philosophical and public relations opposition by those who supported W.E.B. du Bois. He managed to temper both sides by appearing to serve both ideologies—he was vocal about industrial education while also a member of the NAACP, which denounced such education. The controversy led to a scathing article in the influential Washington Bee, titled "Picture For Youth," written by former ally, Ralph W. Tyler. The piece labelled Bruce a failure during his tenure at Tuskegee. While Bruce was recovering from injuries sustained in a car crash in 1915 and fighting a bout of spinal meningitis, his biggest detractor, W. Calvin Chase, the editor of the Washington Bee, published a piece branding Bruce "the most despised man in the city," portraying Bruce as officially and physically unable to do the job, and calling for Bruce's replacement. However, Bruce recovered and resumed his post until a scandal resulted, brought on by Herman M. Bernolet Moens, an obscure Dutch professor introduced to local black middle class circles by, none other than, W.E.B. du Bois.

== Controversy ==
In 1919, Bruce allowed Professor Herman Marie Bernolet Moens, a Dutch ethnologist, to take nude photographs of black high school students, allegedly as part of a study of physical differences between the races.

Moens, a former Panama Canal laborer and self-proclaimed graduate of an "academy in Russia," came to the U.S. in 1914, where he became at “first touched, then interested, and finally fascinated” by African American children. Unable to leave the United States due to the outbreak of World War I, Moens traveled throughout the country studying African American children. During this time, as an outspoken supporter of racial integration and equality, Moens had also become a target of the US Department of Justice, and was accused of being a German spy sent to rouse trouble within the United States.

Moens, who was introduced to D.C. black society by W.E.B. du Bois, said he was going to show that "white people had as much Negro blood in them as colored people" and "to correct the charge that colored people were inferior to white people". With recommendation from the Dutch government, Moens secured himself a position as an investigator for the Smithsonian Institution. In October 1916, and May 1917, Dr. John Van Schaick Jr., then President of the Board of Education, granted Moens permission to take the photographs.

In the fall of 1917, the Department of Justice mounted an investigation of Moens, who was arrested on October 25, 1918, at the home of an unmarried black District teacher for the Miner Normal School for Colored Children, Charlotte Hunter, while the two were having lunch. Hunter was introduced to Moens by the principal of The Normal School. At the time of his trial, she stated that she had known Moens for four years and that he had been her tenant, renting a room at her 1416 11th Street NW home. Hunter had recruited and brought young students to his studio at his request, but only with the permission of, or accompanied by, their parents. Upon learning of her connection to Moens, 2,000 angry black parents and citizens stormed the local high school "Hunting for Hunter," who managed to leave the school before their arrival.

Moens was charged with possession of eight obscene pictures for the purpose of exhibiting them. A trial ensued.

Moens admitted to having "certain illicit relations" and committing "unnatural acts" with least one of the underage girls and to frequenting prostitutes. However, what exactly transpired between the two is unknown; only that the girl "danced around in a nude state" and when a Special Agent for the Justice Department testified about Moens' admitted conduct with the girl, spectators laughed and the judge ordered everyone except lawyers and judges to leave the courtroom. Furthermore, Moens was unable to answer many questions about ethnology, nor questions about the books that he cited as references. He also lacked any records or notes of his work. An expert witness from the Smithsonian Institution discredited Moens, stating that Moens' book selections were simply "nude books". And none of the defense's witnesses were called on by the prosecution.

The jury found Moens guilty and sentenced him to one year in prison; however, an appeals court reversed the decision and he was allowed to return to Europe in 1920 where he published an explanation of what transpired, titled "Towards Perfect Man: Contributions to Somatological and Philosophical Anthropology". In it, he wrote: "Science and art had, and have still, to suffer from the attacks of ignorant people, prejudiced churches and puritanical laws, prompted by the fear of truth."

Moens did receive support from New York professor, James F. Moten Jr, who wrote a letter that he asked the Washington Bee to publish. However, publisher W. Calvin Chase, declined to publish it, writing that Moten was "...a white man, who...does not know what he is talking about..."

Following the investigation and trial, clergy and parents formed the Parents' League, a 2,000 member organization with the slogan, "Bruce Must Go". Charlotte Hunter also resigned amid outrage from the Parents' League.

Bruce resigned his post in April 1919. The Central Northwest Citizens Association brought "moral, pedagogical, and administrative unfitness" charges against him two months later. However, the charges had no legal standing. After 700 pages of testimony, the school board found Bruce competent to retain his position. Upset with the outcome, the Parents' League took their anger to Congress.

In March 1920, five Senators held committee hearings about Bruce, who assigned a three-member committee to investigate him. The investigating committee found him of sound character, but a flawed administrator.

The school Superintendent, Frank W. Ballou, suggested Bruce do one of three things: 1) take a leave of absence, file a defamation suit against the Parents' League, and if he won the suit, his position would be held open for him 2) form a league of his supporters to counter the Parents' League or 3) take a "rest" leave of absence. When Bruce declined to do any of those things, and his presence continued to be a source of contention, on May 18, 1921, Ballou recommended Bruce's termination to the School Board. Bruce took an indefinite leave of absence the following day, while the Board went on to formally fire him.

== Later career ==
In 1927, Bruce moved to Harlem, where he became resident manager of the Dunbar Apartments. The Dunbar Complex was financed by John D. Rockefeller and designed by architect Andrew J. Thomas, with the aim of giving decent accommodation for low-income African Americans. However, Bruce lost his job in 1936 when Rockefeller sold the Dunbar Apartments.

Early in the 1930s, Bruce became editor-in-chief of the Harriet Tubman Publishing Company. He also authored a school textbook called Just Women, which gave a history of notable African-American women.

== Personal life ==
On June 3, 1903, Bruce married Clara Washington Burrill of Washington, D.C. Their wedding was performed by Francis James Grimké at the Fifteenth Street Presbyterian Church. Clara was a Radcliffe and Boston University Law School graduate who was also the first woman anywhere to edit a law review. However, given her race and gender, she struggled to find work as an attorney.

They had three children, Clara Josephine, Roscoe Conkling Jr. ("Bokie"), (Note: Roscoe Conklin Bruce Junior, born in 1906, was at the center of a national debate in 1923 when he was at first prevented from taking a room in Harvard's white freshman dorms. The ban was ordered by Abbott Lawrence Lowell, President of Harvard.) and Burrill Kelso Bruce.

His son Roscoe Jr. embezzled money from an apartment complex he managed in New Jersey and then arranged a phony burglary to explain the absence of funds. He served a year-and-a-half in prison. The legal costs bankrupted the family. The elite whites they had befriended abandoned them, and Roscoe Sr. and Clara were reduced to living on welfare.

His daughter Clara attended Radcliffe like her mother; however, she failed to graduate when she opted to elope with a black actor instead. Clara and her husband were both white-passing African Americans. Their respective skin tones afforded them certain privileges not given to darker African Americans.

Bruce died in New York City on August 16, 1950, at the age of 71. He was buried in Woodlawn Cemetery in Washington, D.C.

== Notes and references ==
Notes

Citations

Sources

- Bruce, Roscoe Conkling (1905). "Freedom Through Education". BlackPast.org.
- Chesnutt, Charles Waddell; Leitz, Robert C. III; McElrath, Joseph R Jr. (2002-03-11). An Exemplary Citizen: Letters of Charles W. Chesnutt, 1906–1932: Letters of Charles W. Chesnutt, 1906–1932. Stanford University Press. p. 176. ISBN 978-0-8047-4508-6.
- Gates, Henry Louis Jr.; Higginbotham, Evelyn Brooks (2009-03-27). "BRUCE, Roscoe Conkling, Sr.". Harlem Renaissance Lives: From the African American National Biography. Oxford University Press. p. 84. ISBN 978-0-19-538795-7.
- Graham, Lawrence Otis (2007-07-03). The Senator and the Socialite: The True Story of America's First Black Dynasty. HarperCollins. p. xxii. ISBN 978-0-06-098513-4.
- Newkirk, Pamela (2009-02-03). Letters from Black America. Macmillan. p. 67. ISBN 978-0-374-10109-1.
- Zimmerman, Andrew (2010-03-29). Alabama in Africa: Booker T. Washington, the German Empire, and the Globalization of the New South. Princeton University Press. ISBN 978-0-691-12362-2.
