= Josephine Beall Willson Bruce =

American women's rights activist

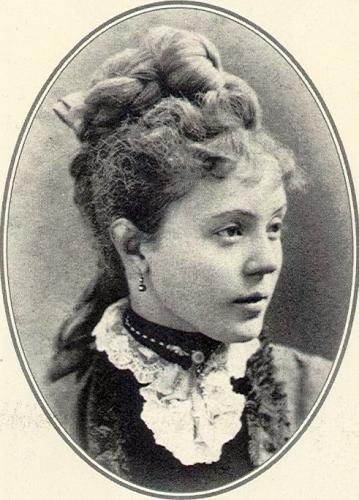
- Born: Josephine Beall Willson; October 29, 1853; Philadelphia, Pennsylvania, U.S.
- Died: February 15, 1923 (aged 69); Kimball, West Virginia, U.S.
- Spouse: Blanche Bruce
- Children: Roscoe Conkling Bruce

Josephine Beall Willson Bruce (October 29, 1853 – February 15, 1923) was a women's rights activist in the late 1890s and early 1900s. She spent a majority of her time working for the National Organization of Afro-American Women. She was a prominent socialite in Washington, D.C., throughout most of her life where she lived with her husband, United States Senator Blanche Bruce. In addition to these accomplishments, she was the first Black teacher in the public school system in Cleveland, and she eventually became a highly regarded educator at Tuskegee University in Alabama.

== Early life ==
Josephine Beall Willson was born in Philadelphia on October 29, 1853, to Dr. Joseph Willson and Elizabeth Harnett Willson, the first of five children for the pair. Her family spent no more than a year in Philadelphia, moving to Cleveland in 1854. The family prioritized education and sent Josephine to Cleveland Central High School, where she graduated in 1871. After graduation, she took several teaching courses which then gave her the opportunity to teach at the Mayflower school, making her the first African-American teacher in the public school system of Cleveland, Ohio.

== Personal life ==
In 1878 she married Senator Blanche Bruce, with whom she honeymooned in Europe for four months. Upon their return to the United States, they settled in Washington, D.C. Bruce had her only child, Roscoe Conkling Bruce, in 1879. He was named after Republican Senator Roscoe Conkling. She delayed the christening of her son until he could be taken to Cleveland, so that the same rector who had performed her marriage could christen her child.

Bruce dedicated her life to the National Organization of Afro-American Women (NACW), running for the vice presidency of the organization in 1896. In 1898 her husband, Blanche K. Bruce, died, after which she competently managed the family's money and land on her own. At the invitation of Booker T. Washington, she served as the principal at Tuskegee University from 1899 to 1902. That position gave her the opportunity to train other educators, as the institute was itself vocational. Her transition to Tuskegee was made more difficult by the rural background of most students there, in contrast to her pedagogic experiences in the more cosmopolitan North. Some criticized Bruce as a wealthy woman taking a job that might have been filled by a less privileged woman more sympathetic to the needs of Tuskegee students.

Bruce's son Roscoe graduated from Harvard University in 1902, later becoming the head of the academic department at Tuskegee University. Josephine Bruce then moved to Mississippi for a short time to live with her family, only to return to Washington, D.C., to run for the presidency of the NACW in 1906. She died of a heart attack in her sleep on February 15, 1923, in Kimball, West Virginia.

== Social life ==
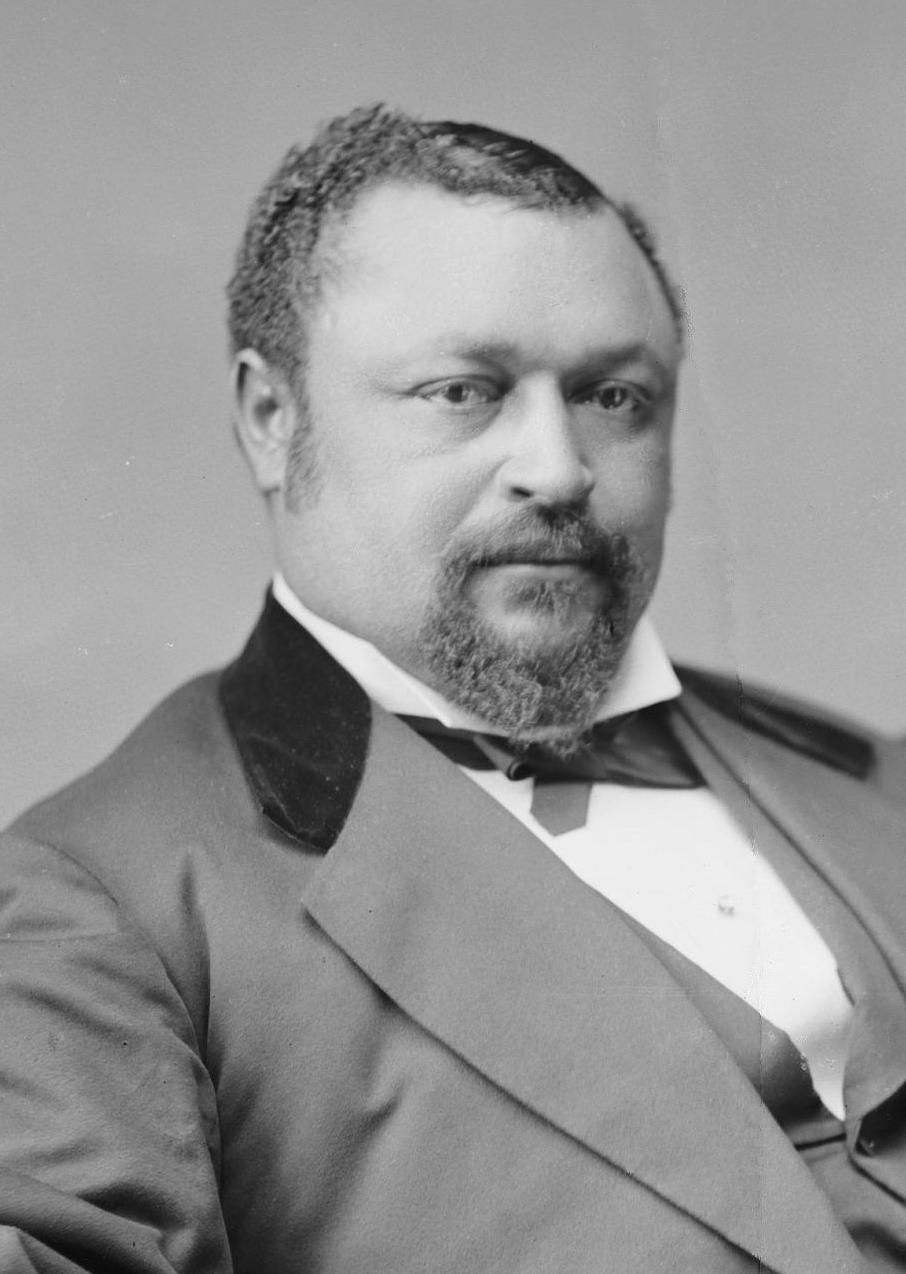
Blanche Bruce, Josephine's husband

Bruce was an accomplished hostess and socialite, especially during her husband's years serving in the Senate. The African-American newspaper Washington Bee noted that Bruce "pays and receives calls from those of her select set with unvarying regard for etiquette". She was said to be fashionable and a great beauty. Newspapers placed great emphasis on her complexion, remarking that it did not evidence an African heritage and that her skin was so fair that she could pass for a Spanish lady. One account said she had blonde hair and blue eyes.

Bruce and her husband were often criticized by members of the black community, who claimed the Bruces spent more time with whites than blacks. Whites also snubbed Bruce and her husband, excluding them from social events unrelated to Blanche Bruce's position in the Senate. Democrats and their wives refused to visit Bruce, looking down on her because of her racial heritage. After her husband's senate career ended, Bruce's social rejection by whites became more frequent.

== Activism ==
The exclusion of African-American women from white suffrage groups prompted African-American feminists to form their own separate national organization, giving Josephine Bruce the chance to play various leadership roles. She accordingly became associated with the National Organization of Afro-American Women (NACW), running for the vice presidency of the organization in 1896. Despite her work for the organization, she lost the election, possibly because of her fair complexion. She helped inspire the career of Mary Church Terrell by inviting the younger woman to stay with her in Washington.

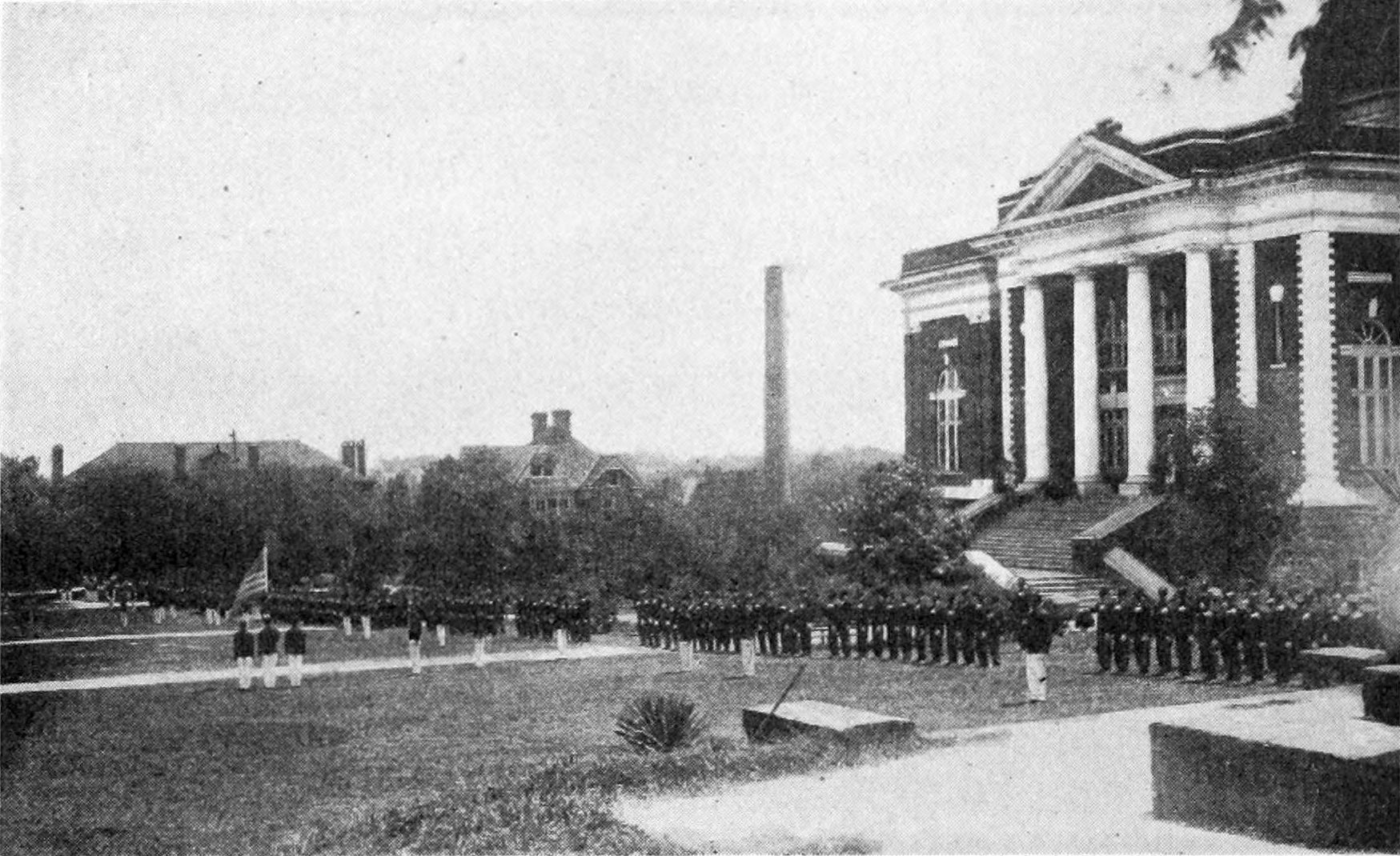
Tuskegee University, where Josephine Bruce served as "Lady Principal"

Bruce also worked alongside black female teachers to strengthen the newly created National Association for the Advancement of Colored People (NAACP). Bruce was also involved with the World Purity Federation and Women's Christian Temperance Union. In addition to her activism, she traveled extensively with her husband when he lectured on a circuit as a Senator. She became the editor of the NACW's National Notes, her writings for which discussed the need for better education for colored women.

Despite Bruce's heavy involvement with the NACW, members of the NACW accuses Mary Church Terrell, Bruce's friend and president of the NACW, of handpicking Bruce to be her successor.

Bruce was also a strong proponent for suffrage, aligning her goals with those of the NACW.

Bruce continued to live in Washington, D.C., in the following years as a socialite, and eventually moved to West Virginia, where she lived until her death. She was respected by many, though her light complexion, which alienated black women, and her African heritage, which alienated white women, made her an outsider to the both groups.

== Effects of class ==
Josephine Bruce and her husband were part of an newly emerging elite African-American class that saw itself as separate from and unconcerned with the larger African-American community. Members of this aspiring elite “defended the thesis that the social equality of all Negroes was a concept destructive to racial progress”. Professional men such as scholars and office holders, despite obstacles, became more similar to the white community.

Many African Americans thought the Bruces were “not good enough for whites and too good for their own race” Many white people in 1883 thought that wealth, learning, and official place did not give African-American families, like the Bruces, the right to enter white society. As a result, the Bruces won complete acceptance from neither whites nor African-Americans.

== Writings and speeches ==
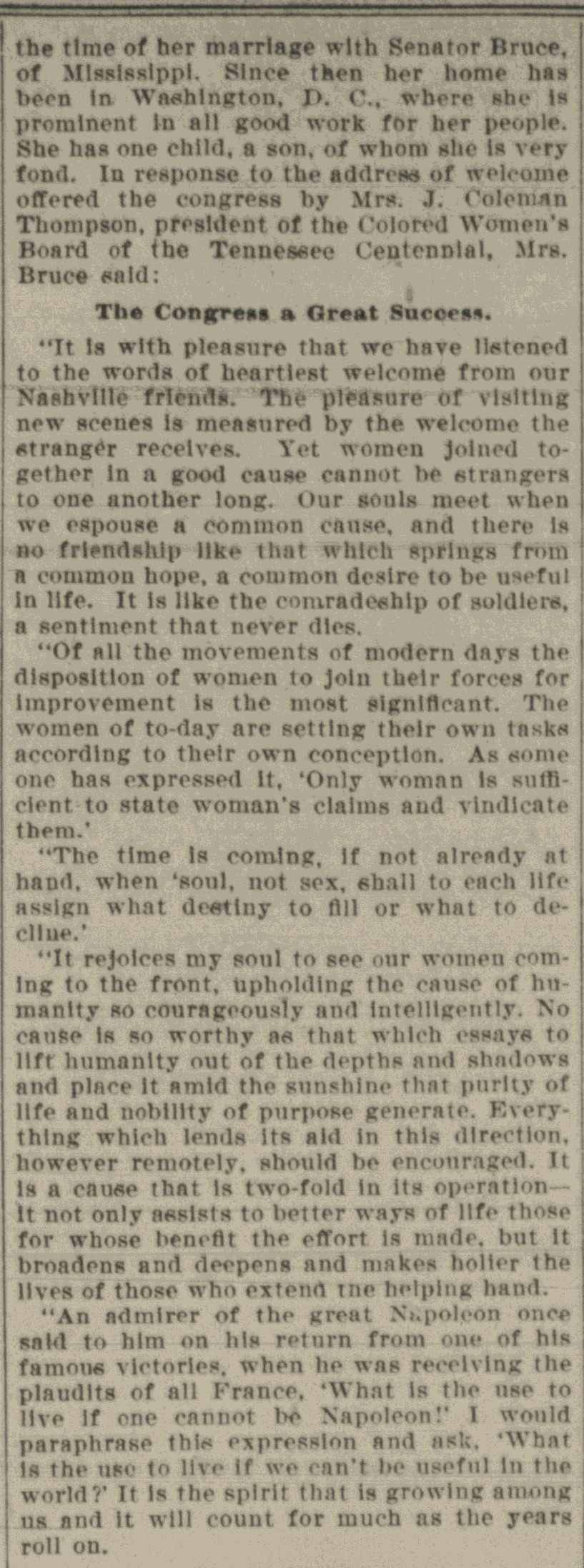
Josephine's speech featured in the Philadelphia Times

Bruce wrote several articles and speeches on education and activism, including two articles for The Voice of the Negro, one article for The Crisis, and a speech transcribed in the Philadelphia Times.

The Congress a Great Success

In 1879, after the National Congress of Colored Women merged with the National Association of Colored Women, Bruce gave a speech commemorating the union. She advocated women's suffrage and celebrated the common cause that united African-American women. She also acknowledged black women's unique position to advocate women's rights.

What Has Education Done for Colored Women

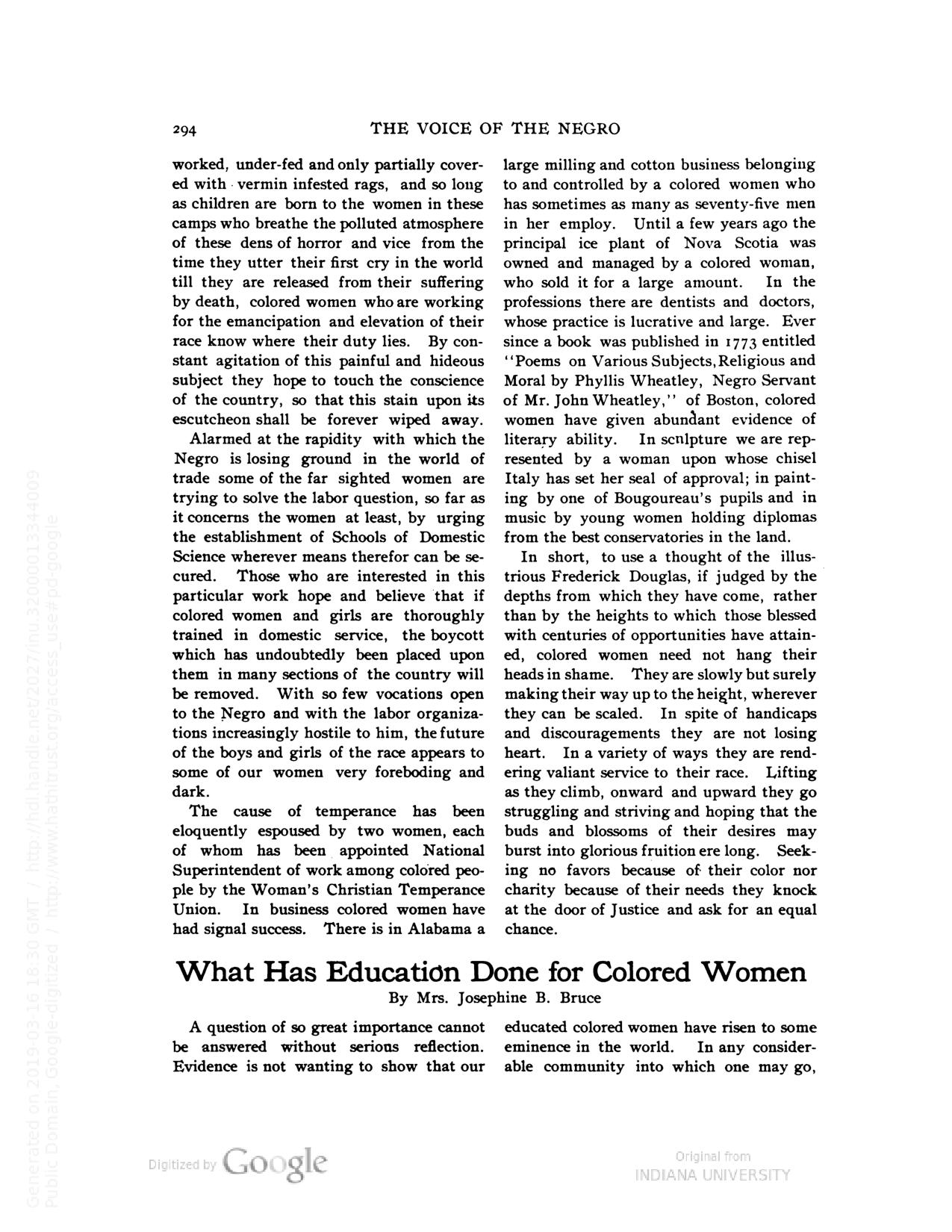
First page of "What Has Education Done for Colored Women"

In the African-American literary journal The Voice of the Negro in 1904, Bruce contrasted the experiences of African-Americans in Virginia, Louisiana, and Ohio to illustrate the importance of education, or its neglect, attributing the "pathetic conditions" of African-Americans in Calumet, Louisiana, for example, to their lack of education, while linking the creation of the upper class in Xenia, Ohio with the residents' higher education levels.

The Afterglow of the Women's Convention

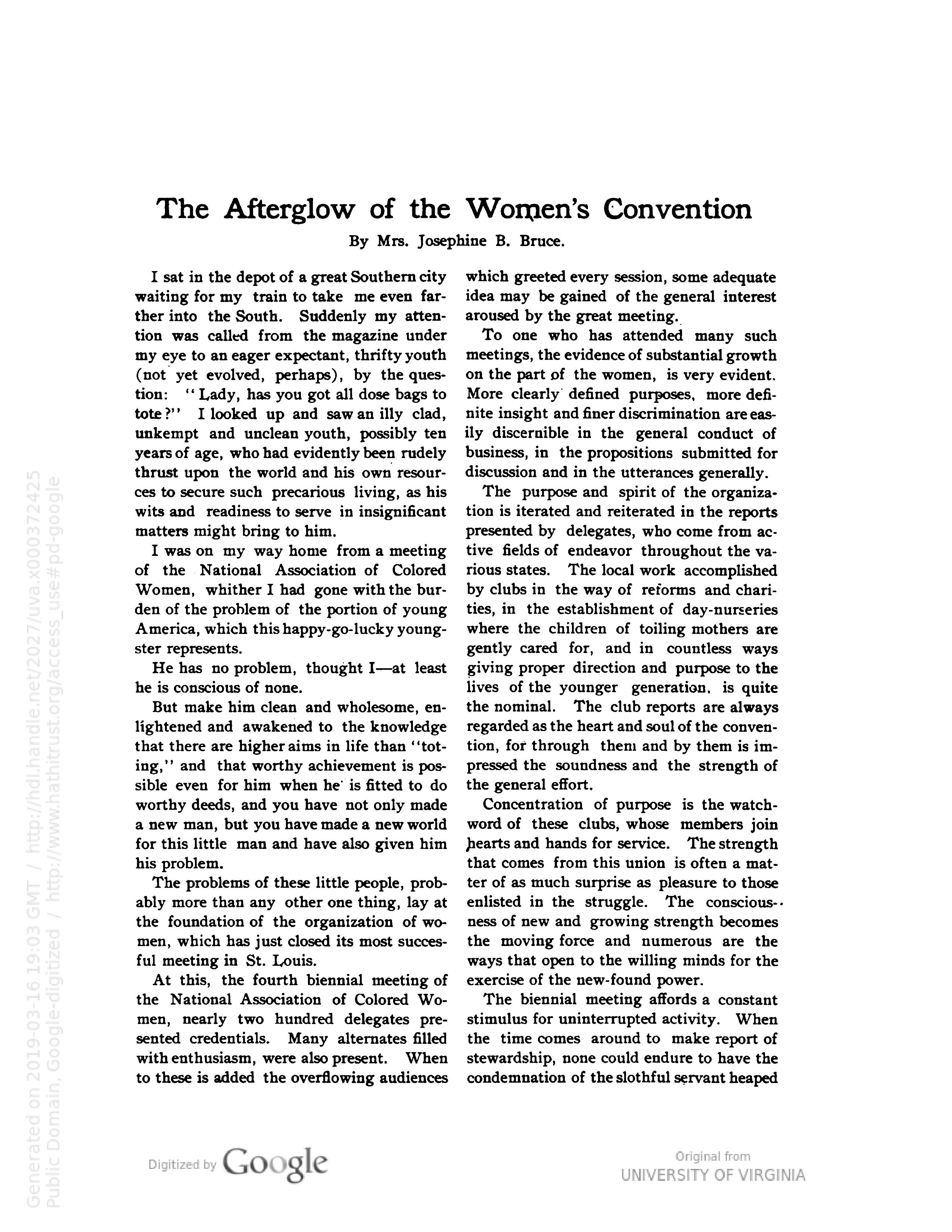
First page of "Afterglow of Women's Convention"

In November 1904, Josephine wrote for The Voice of the Negro about the results of the NACW's convention.

Colored Women's Clubs

This article was published in August 1915 in The Crisis, the official magazine of the National Association for the Advancement of Colored People. Writing as Mrs. B. K. Bruce, Josephine traced the origin of the national club movement among colored women to Josephine St. Pierre Ruffin's call for a meeting among suffragette women. Consecutive conventions after that led the National Federation of Colored Women and the National League of Colored Women to merge, forming the National Association of Colored Women. She called the organization a “social service not alone for colored people but for humanity”. Over 400 delegates attended these conventions, she said, coming "from the East the West, the North and the South".
