= The Boston Foundation =

US non-profit organization

- Abbreviation: TBF
- Formation: 1915; 111 years ago
- Legal status: 501(c)(3) organization
- Headquarters: Boston, Massachusetts, U.S.
- Endowment: $530 million (2022)
- Website: www.tbf.org

The Boston Foundation is a community foundation established in 1915. Serving the city of Boston, Massachusetts, and environs, it is made up of nearly 1,100 separate charitable funds established by donors over more than 100 years. Funds are set up for the community or for special purposes, such as supporting individual non-profit organizations or particular causes. Since 2001, the Boston Foundation has commissioned and published research, hosted forums and platforms for discussion and public policy development, and joined or formed coalitions addressing issues around individual-, systems- and root-level causes of inequity facing Boston and the region.

== History ==
The Boston Foundation was founded in 1915 by Charles E. and Charles M. Rogerson, who were father and son. Originally called the Permanent Charity Fund, it was the third community foundation created in the United States. The foundation introduced a new approach to philanthropy, as the first community foundation to collect funds from across the region and use its endowment to improve the life of the community. Rogerson allowed a distribution committee, composed of prominent citizens, to make grants on the basis of perceived need.

In 1985, the foundation was renamed The Boston Foundation, and Anna Faith Jones became its president. Jones was the first African-American woman to lead a major foundation in the United States. She was succeeded in 2001 by President and CEO Paul S. Grogan. During Grogan's tenure, the foundation expanded its civic engagement activities to commissioning and publishing research into urban issues, holding public forums, forming task forces and coalitions, and informing legislative solutions to some of the city's problems.

In 2012, the Boston Foundation merged with The Philanthropic Initiative (TPI), which operates as a distinct unit of the Foundation. TPI, founded in 1989, offers consulting services to high-net-worth individuals, families, foundations, and corporations globally. I

On December 1, 2020, the foundation announced that Grogan would be replaced by Emerson College President M. Lee Pelton. Pelton took office on June 1, 2021. On May 21, 2026, Pelton announced his intent to step down later in the year.

== Mission ==
The Foundation aims to close societal gaps through programs and grants that promote access to healthcare and early education, strengthen the community economy, and advocate for community leadership.

The Foundation also commissions public research into a range of issues related to the Greater Boston region, with the aim of contributing to public policy.

== Governance ==
The foundation is overseen by a board of directors of up to 20 members, who may serve two five-year terms. The staff includes professionals in grant-making, fund-raising, research, finance, administration, and communications.

== Grant-making ==
The Foundation's grants have assisted nonprofit organizations that aim to address a variety of systemic needs including migrant assistance, public health, education and crime prevention. It has also provided seed capital and other support for new institutions and charitable endeavors.

The Foundation's assistance has included:

- Providing grants to help launch WGBH-TV, now a major U.S. public television station
- An early investment in the redevelopment of Faneuil Hall into a central retail marketplace, often associated with Boston's renewal in the late 20th century
- Helping to develop Boston's Longwood Medical Center area
- Providing grants to Save the Harbor / Save the Bay to clean up Boston Harbor
- Investing in an extensive network of community health centers across Boston neighborhoods
- Making early grants to U.S. organizations that started in Boston such as Citizen Schools, City Year, GreenLight Fund, and Year Up.
- Serving as the initial home for Embrace Boston, now a standalone nonprofit, which envisioned, planned, and oversaw the creation and installation of The Embrace and 1965 Freedom Plaza to honor Martin Luther King Jr. and Coretta Scott King as well as other community civil rights advocates in the first new monument on Boston Common in almost a century.

In 2023, 75.6% of the foundation's giving came through donor advised funds (DAFs). In 2023, the Foundation and its donors made $175,374,000 in grants to nonprofits in Greater Boston and across the U.S. From 2001 to 2021 the Foundation focused its giving on housing and community development, education and workforce development, arts and culture, civic engagement, community safety, health and human services, the nonprofit sector, and the urban environment.

The Foundation often takes on special initiatives to address issues affecting the community, such as civic engagement, pilot schools, and homelessness prevention.

== Civic leadership ==
Beyond grantmaking, the Foundation convenes public-private partnerships, helps build coalitions among nonprofit organizations, rallies funders to invest in organizations and issues commissions research from universities,and lobbies for legislation to advance its mission of reducing economic, educational, and social inequities. Research has been a significant and growing part of its work since 2000. Partnering with think tanks and other organizations it developed a series of reports called Understanding Boston, presented in public forums. Issues addressed through Understanding Boston include public education, housing, the workforce, health, philanthropy and the nonprofit sector, the arts, and the urban environment. The Understanding Boston "branding" was largely phased out by 2022.

The Foundation also creates task forces and action agendas that aim to produce positive change. For example:

- The Commonwealth Housing Task Force created a Smart Growth housing effort to address the shortage of housing in Massachusetts.
- The Massachusetts Cultural Facilities Fund, which provided state funding for cultural facilities. Its work examining the current Criminal Offender Record Information (CORI) system led to a re-evaluation of the system by state lawmakers.
- The Foundation's research and public information campaign related to public education influenced the Governor's approach to education across Massachusetts.
- Wage Equity Now was a coalition formed by the Boston Foundation to lobby for equal pay and transparency in gender differences in the workplace, culminating in the 2024 Frances Perkins Workplace Equity Act, signed into law by Governer Maura Healey in August 2024.
- The Partnership to Close the Racial Wealth Gap, now the Racial Wealth Gap Partnership, was established by TBF in 2022 and comprises 40 members from across a range of sectors, working to expand access to homeownership for communities of color through down payment assistance and other mechanisms.

The Boston Foundation's civic leadership activities still include conducting or sponsoring research and disseminating information that increases understanding about issues affecting Greater Boston and its communities, and may be useful in advocating for policy change. This is mainly led by Boston Indicators, the research arm of the Foundation, although other departments within TBF commission outside research.

== Boston Indicators ==
The Boston Indicators Project was launched in an era when datasets were less accessible to the general public. Working in partnership with community groups, municipal leaders, and Greater Boston's civic data community, Boston Indicators produced special reports and hosted public convenings. It tracked progress on civic goals and other changes across 10 sectors: Civic Vitality, Cultural Life and the Arts, the Economy, Education, the Environment, Health, Housing, Public Safety, Technology, and Transportation. Originally it aimed to release a biennial report, with supplemental updates and outreach, through the year 2030, Boston's 400th anniversary.

Original partners of the project included:

- The Boston Redevelopment Authority
- City of Boston
- The John LaWare Leadership Forum
- MetroBoston DataCommon
- The Metropoliitan Area Planning Council
- Open Indicators Consortium
- Planet-TECH Associates

The project's first report, The Wisdom of Our Choices, was released in 2000. The second report, Creativity and Innovation: A Bridge to the Future, was released in early 2003, along with the launch of the Boston Indicators Project's interactive website. The website received the International Tech Museum 2003 Award for using technology to further equality. The Indicators Framework, a curated online catalogue of 350 measures of well-being in the Boston area, continues to be available online, but has not been updated since 2015.

As of 2016, Boston Indicators became a standalone department within the Boston Foundation rather than a joint initiative hosted by TBF. The increased online accessibility of public data made the biennial publishing of massive collections of statistics less essential. The importance of data and analysis remained, and Boston Indicators began to publish more frequently on more targeted topics aligned with the Boston Foundation's mission and goals.

Between 2016 and the end of 2025, under the leadership of Executive Director Luc Schuster, Boston Indicators published more than 40 reports and briefs, from The Geography of Incarceration to A New Path to Homeownership: Early Findings from the ONE+ Mortgage Program, covering demographics, housing dynamics, and policy impacts, among other topics. Beginning in 2023, Boston Indicators staff have managed production of The Greater Boston Housing Report Card, an annual deep dive into the region's housing stats and trends, which was launched by the Boston Foundation in 2002.

All Boston Indicators reports are available on its website, bostonindicators.org, along with shorter research briefs, blog posts, and links to video recordings of presentations and forums.
