= Ella Payne Moran =

American educator

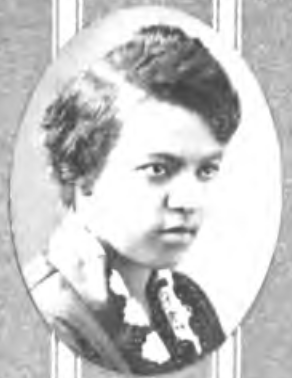
- Ella V. Payne, later Moran, from the 1921 yearbook of Howard University
- Born: Ella Viola Payne; August 30, 1898; Washington, D.C., U.S.
- Died: March 1985 (age 86)
- Occupation: Educator
- Relatives: Anthony Bowen (great-grandfather)

Ella Viola Payne Moran (August 30, 1898 – March 1985) was an American educator and clubwoman. She coordinated the practical nursing program at Margaret Murray Washington Vocational High School in Washington, D.C. She was honored by the District of Columbia in 1957, for her work on training nurses. In 1962 she was named Director of the Year by the National Association for Practical Nurse Education and Service.

== Early life and education ==
Payne was born in Washington, D.C., the daughter of E. Charles Payne and Frances E. Thompson Payne. Her great-grandfather, Anthony Bowen, was a prominent nineteenth-century African-American leader in Washington, D.C. She graduated from Dunbar High School in 1917, and graduated from Howard University in 1921, with a bachelor's degree in home economics.

== Career ==
Although she was not herself a trained nurse, Moran coordinated the practical nursing program at M. M. Washington Vocational High School in Washington, D.C. Her students found job placements at Gallinger Hospital and Walter Reed Army Medical Center. She also set up an evening adult class in practical nursing, which eventually became part of the D.C. Health Service. She was honored by the D.C. Employee Recognition Program in 1957, by the Agnes E. and Eugene Meyer Foundation in 1959, and by the Washington Vocational Evening School in 1960.

In 1958 Moran accompanied one of her students, Mary P. Evans, when Evans was the only Black finalist in the Pillsbury Bake-Off in New York City. Also in 1958, her story was dramatized in a play, A Dream Come True in White and Blue, directed by Owen Dodson; the part of "Ella Payne Moran" was played by a Howard drama student, Toni Wofford, later known as writer Toni Morrison. In 1962 she was named Director of the Year by the National Association for Practical Nurse Education and Service.

Moran was a member of Alpha Kappa Alpha, and participated in the sorority's Mississippi Health Project as an interviewer and dietitian. In 1947 she attended the sixth annual national conference on Conservation of Marriage and Family, held in North Carolina. She also taught at Black high schools in West Virginia and Missouri.

Moran was active in Black women's clubwork in Washington, D.C. In 1940 she was one of the members of the National Council of Negro Women invited to a tea at the White House, hosted by Eleanor Roosevelt. In 1951 she hosted a gathering honoring Gaynelle Miles, and including Dorothy Boulding Ferebee.

== Publications ==
- "Anthony Bowen" (1944, Negro History Bulletin)
- She Wasn't Even a Nurse (1974, memoir)

== Personal life ==
Payne married James H. Moran in 1943. He died in 1956. She died in 1985, at the age of 86.
