= Marjorie Hill =

American educator and sorority founder (1886–1909)

- Born: Marjarie Arizona Hill; May 1886; Arizona, U.S.
- Died: December 17, 1909 (aged 23); Washington, D.C., U.S.
- Burial place: Woodlawn Cemetery (Washington, D.C.)
- Education: Howard University
- Occupation: Teacher
- Known for: Founding Alpha Kappa Alpha

Marjorie Arizona Hill (May 1886 – December 17, 1909) was an American educator and one of the nine founders of the Alpha Kappa Alpha sorority at Howard University. Alpha Kappa Alpha was the first sorority to be founded by African-American women.

== Early life ==
Majorie Arizona Hill was born in Arizona in May 1886. Her parents were Florence (née Gance) and George Hill, who both worked as cooks. She lived in Washington, D.C. in her early life. She attended M Street High School in Washington, D.C., graduating in 1904 alongside Margaret Flagg Holmes.

Hill enrolled in the School of Arts and Sciences at Howard University in the fall of 1904. On January 15, 1908, she and Holmes became founding members of Alpha Kappa Alpha, along with seven other female students. Alpha Kappa Alpha was the first college sorority to be founded by African-American women. Hill was noted for her involvement in the sorority's day-to-day operations.

Hill graduated from Howard University in 1908 with a Bachelor of Arts degree in pedegogy and political science.

== Career ==
In October 1908, Hill became a teacher at Virginia Collegiate and Industrial Institute in Lynchburg, Virginia, a branch of Morgan College in Baltimore, Maryland.

== Personal life ==
Hill moved from Washington, D.C. to Lynchburg, Virginia in October 1908. In 1909, she visited the Howard University campus with her sorority sister, Lucy Diggs Stowe.

Hill died on December 17, 1909, in Washington, D.C., at the age of 25 years. She was buried in Woodlawn Cemetery in Washington D.C.
