= Mississippi Health Project =

Health initiative in Mississippi, United States

The Mississippi Health Project was a health initiative sponsored by the Alpha Kappa Alpha sorority during the Great Depression. The purpose of the Mississippi Health Project was to bring health awareness to Mississippi Delta residents who did not have access to health care. The initiative lasted for six years, until World War II. Mobile clinics were set up underneath trees. Surgeon General Thomas Parran called the project "one of the greatest efforts of volunteer public health" he had ever seen.

== Background ==
At the beginning of the twentieth century, the Deep South was a place riddled with inequality. Jim Crow was the way of life around the South. Many Southern African Americans worked in low-paying jobs, such as maids, laborers, and farm hands (sharecroppers) in "separate but equal" facilities. At the time, African-Americans did not have access to medical care or clinics.

During the time of the project, Mississippi's Health Department did not treat African Americans due to segregation of facilities. Often, African Americans had to walk miles for health care, which was generally substandard. The socioeconomic lifestyle for African Americans were also poor at the time, since African-Americans did not have the same opportunities as Caucasian Americans.

== Beginnings ==
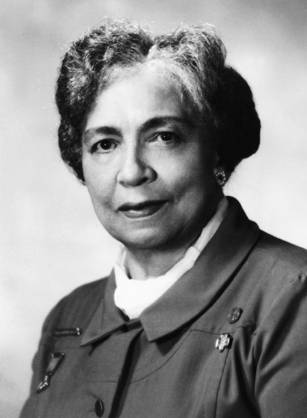
Dororthy Ferebee served as medical director for the Mississippi Health Project.

Alpha Kappa Alpha Sorority saw the need to bring the attention of Mississippi Delta to African-American families who "were on the brink of social and economic disaster" due to the Great Depression. Ninth International President Ida L. Jackson founded the project as part of her administration. The project would treat poor, rural African-American Mississippians with primary medical care. Jackson had acquired $1,000 from the Boulé to fund the project in December 1935.

Dorothy Celeste Boulding Ferebee, a physician and Alpha Kappa Alpha's tenth International President, served as the first medical director for the Mississippi Health Project; the "seven year program stands as one [of] the most impressive examples of voluntary public health work ever conducted by black physicians in the Jim Crow South, touching thousands of black Mississippians at a time when they had virtually no access to professional medical care." The sorority provided the materials to assist the medical patients.

From 1935 to 1942, the Mississippi Health Project was active for about two to six weeks in the summer. Mobile medical units in poverty-stricken areas were sent to rural African-American populations. The project was endorsed by U.S. Senator Byron Patton Harrison and Mississippi's Department of Health. The United States Public Health Service also was involved. At the peak of the project, it aided nearly 15,000 children and families.

Alpha Kappa Alpha members drew federal attention to the needs of African Americans in the rural South. Project participants had smallpox and diphtheria immunization programs in African-American sharecropper communities. With the assistance of physicians, venereal disease, syphilis, and malaria were treated. Health and food workshops were given by the sorority to bring attention to the region's high malnutrition rate. Ella Payne Moran was a dietitian on the project.

== Legacy ==
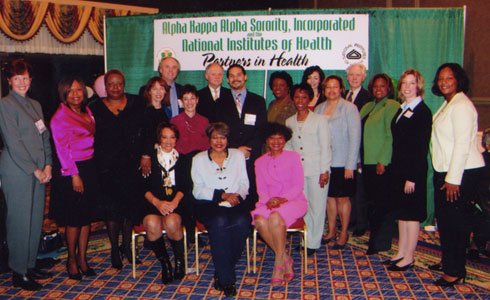
Seated: Yvonne T. Maddox, NICHD Deputy Director; Linda White, Worldwide Head of AKA; and Juanita Doty, AKA Program Chair. Standing: Representatives from NIH Institutes and Jackson, Mississippi.

The United States Supreme Court's unanimous ruling in Brown v. Board of Education (1954) outlawed segregation of public facilities. This ruling lead to improved access to healthcare for African-Americans in the South after the Civil Rights Movement in the 1950s and 1960s.

During the late 1990s, U.S. Senator Thad Cochran (R-MS), along with a group of Jackson residents, converted a former retail mall into a major medical facility in the region. The Jackson Medical Mall is now home to clinics and offices belonging to the University of Mississippi Medical Center (UMMC), in addition to Jackson State University and Tougaloo College educational facilities. Also based out of the mall is the Jackson Heart Study, which is supported by both the National Heart, Lung, and Blood Institute and the National Center for Minority Health and Health Disparities.

In 2006, Alpha Kappa Alpha paired with the National Institutes of Health (NIH) in celebrating the seventy-first anniversary of the Mississippi Health Project. International President Linda White commented on the necessity to bring attention to the healthcare in the area: "Our members began working with the NIH in a campaign to reduce the risks of sudden infant death syndrome among African-American infants. We are happy to expand our relationship to make a real impact on reducing health disparities."

== Books cited ==
- McNealey, Earnestine G. (2006). Pearls of Service: The Legacy of America's First Black Sorority, Alpha Kappa Alpha. Chicago: Alpha Kappa Alpha Sorority, Incorporated. LCCN 2006928528.
