= Beulah Burke =

American academic and sorority founder

Beulah Elizabeth Burke
- Beulah Burke, original founder of Alpha Kappa Alpha and home economics teacher
- Born: July 20, 1885; Hertford, North Carolina, U.S.
- Died: April 8, 1975 (age 89); Washington, D.C., U.S.

Beulah Elizabeth Burke (1885–1975), was, along with her sister, Lillie, one of the nine original founders of Alpha Kappa Alpha sorority in 1908, the first sorority founded by African-American women. In her leadership as an educator and civic activist, Burke created important social capital. Her legacy of Alpha Kappa Alpha has continued to contribute to society for over 100 years.

Burke was instrumental in founding and leading new chapters at colleges in the Midwest. The African-American population was dramatically increasing in major cities there due to the Great Migration. Young women in Chicago and other cities had more chances for education through high school and college. The chapters Burke established helped support African-American women in college and prepare them for later leadership to help the next generations in society.

Beulah Burke demonstrated in her work as an educator, sorority leader and civic activist how African-American sororities supported women "to create spheres of influence, authority and power within institutions that traditionally have allowed African Americans and women little formal authority and real power."

== Early life ==
Burke was born in Hertford, North Carolina and had a sister Lillie. After her family moved to Washington, DC, both Burke and her sister entered Howard Preparatory School in 1900 for high school.

Burke graduated in 1904 from the school and entered Howard College (later University) later that year. Burke attended Howard University, the top historically black college in the nation, at a time when only 1/3 of 1% of African Americans and 5% of whites of eligible age attended any college.

== Howard University and founding Alpha Kappa Alpha ==
Together with eight other women, Burke founded Alpha Kappa Alpha on January 15, 1908. Burke suggested Alpha Kappa Alpha to be the name of the sorority. Burke also named the organization's motto, since she took classes relating to Greek and symbolism. Her suggestions of the sorority's colors: salmon pink and apple green, were adopted.

In addition to Greek, during college Burke studied Latin, German, political science, chemistry, and physics. Burke graduated from Howard University with a Bachelor of Arts in 1908.

== Career ==
After graduating from Howard, Burke did graduate work at University of Chicago and completed her Masters of Arts in home economics, then considered a new field, at Columbia University.

Burke worked as an educator at the high school level in both academic subjects, teaching Latin, German, and English; and the life skills of home economics, at Sumner High School in Kansas City; Georgia public schools, and Atlantic City Schools in New Jersey. She also taught at Delaware State University in Dover, Delaware and acted as a consultant in home economics to Atlantic City.

At one time Burke managed a housing project in New Jersey. After retiring from the Atlantic City school system, Burke returned in the 1940s to Washington, DC to direct Lucy Diggs Slowe Hall at Howard University. Slowe Hall was built by the Federal government in 1942 to provide housing for African-American women working for the government during the war years. It was later transferred to Howard University, which used it as a residence for women. The hall was named after fellow Alpha Kappa Alpha founder Lucy Diggs Slowe, first dean of women at Howard University .

In addition to her work with the sorority (below), Burke was an active member of both professional - the National Education Association - and civic associations: the NAACP and the YMCA, in Washington, D.C.

== Activity in expanding Alpha Kappa Alpha ==
Burke served an active role in expanding the organization during years of rapid social change. She established undergraduate chapters at the University of Chicago (Beta) and the University of Illinois (Gamma). The first chapter Burke helped to establish in the Midwest was Delta at the University of Kansas on February 15, 1915.

Burke also established the second graduate chapter (Beta Omega) in Kansas City, Missouri, in 1920, and led as president for two years. Burke established the third graduate chapter (Mu Omega) in 1922 and served as the president. Three years later, Burke organized and was the first Regional Director of Alpha Kappa Alpha's Midwestern Region.

Burke's creation of new chapters in the Midwest kept pace with the dramatic increase of African American population, especially in Chicago, due to the Great Migration. As a result, more African American women had the chance for education, including college. Burke's leadership and example gave them support to succeed and to learn how to give back to the community. At a time when discrimination was a burden, the sorority chapters encouraged African American students, helping them to incorporate aspects of "racial identification, cultural heritage and social uplift."

Burke served as Second Anti-Basileus in 1923–24, as well as in other regional and local offices. In 1958, Burke was quoted on the subject of Alpha Kappa Alpha's golden anniversary:

I think fundamentally we should regard our fiftieth anniversary as just another milestone in our history - as another opportunity to rededicate ourselves to the high purposes which have been emphasized and reemphasized throughout the history of Alpha Kappa Alpha Sorority.

In 1968, Burke and fellow founders Lavinia Norman and Norma Boyd were honored at the Founders' Day Banquet. Burke was active in the sorority for sixty-seven years, until her death in 1975 in Washington, D.C.
