= Joanna Berry Shields =

Founder of Alpha Kappa Alpha

Joanna Mary Berry Shields
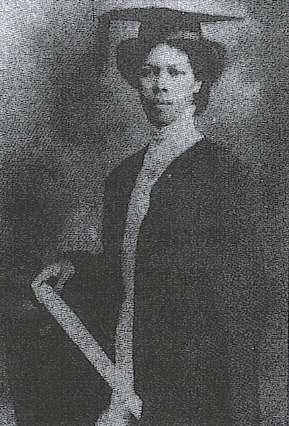
- Joanna Shields graduating from Howard University
- Born: July 7, 1884; Catharpin, Virginia, U.S.
- Died: February 2, 1965 (aged 80); New York, New York, U.S.
- Occupations: founder of Alpha Kappa Alpha sorority; Teacher
- Spouse: Dr. Samuel J. Shields
- Children: Vivian, Samuel, Jr.; Martha, Thomas, Hanna and Landrum
- Parent(s): Carrie Lucas and Charles Berry

Joanna Mary Berry Shields (July 7, 1884 - February 2, 1965) was one of the seven members of the sophomore class of Alpha Kappa Alpha sorority, the first sorority founded by African-American women.

She served as an educator for more than 20 years, both in the South, where need was especially critical, and in New York City, where African-American migration had created a new community.

In addition, she was a leader in civic activities, where her years of accomplishments caused her to be chosen for the New York Mayor's Committee on Human Rights and the Consumers Protective Committee. In her life, Shields demonstrated how African-American sororities supported women "to create spheres of influence, authority and power within institutions that traditionally have allowed African Americans and women little formal authority and real power."

== Early life and education ==
Joanna Mary Berry was born in Catharpin, Virginia to Charles and Carrie Lucas Berry. Growing up, Berry attended private schools in Prince William County. At Manassas Industrial School in Manassas, Virginia, she graduated with high honors. She attended Howard University's preparatory school in 1901, where she gained a high school education.

In those years, only 1/3 of 1% of African Americans and 5% of whites attended any college, and Howard University was considered the top historically black college. At Howard University, Joanna earned a Bachelor of Arts degree cum laude in social science and mathematics.

== Founding Alpha Kappa Alpha ==
Berry was one of nine women who founded Alpha Kappa Alpha on January 15, 1908. She was the custodian of the chapter's records in 1909. After graduation, Joanna Shields was minimally involved for years in Alpha Kappa Alpha activities.

When Berry relocated to Winston-Salem, North Carolina in 1922, she revived her connection to Alpha Kappa Alpha, by joining Phi Omega, a local graduate chapter. She also volunteered in youth activity through Alpha Kappa Alpha.

She was a chapter delegate to the 1935 Richmond Boulé and received a special diamond pin for founding Alpha Kappa Alpha. After moving to New York in 1937, Shields was a member with Tau Omega in New York City until her death. She also kept in contact with fellow founder Lavinia Norman.

== Teaching and civic leadership ==
After earning her degree, Berry returned to Virginia and taught at her old school, Manassas Institute. In 1911, Berry moved to North Carolina, where she taught at Slater Normal School, creating generations of teachers, one of the most critical and prestigious professions in the South. Later the school expanded its curriculum to become a full university, now called Winston-Salem State University.

Berry met her husband, Samuel J. Shields, in New York City in 1913. They had six children together. The Shields family moved to South Carolina.

There Joanna Shields worked as an educator at Central School in Darlington. In 1920, with financial support of the Rosenwald Fund, she increased the school year for African-American children from three to six months.

Two years later, Shields and her family moved back to Winston-Salem, North Carolina. Shields began to participate more in civic and religious activities. She was secretary at the Wentz Memorial Church and worked with the church's nursery school.

In 1937 Shields and her family returned to New York City. There Shields taught English at Christopher Columbus High School in the Bronx until 1943.

Shields also was active in community groups, such as the Harlem YMCA, NAACP, Negro History Club, and the National Council of Negro Women. She was instrumental as an advocate for consumers and senior citizen's rights by serving on the Mayor's Committee on Human Rights and the Consumers Protective Committee. She worked in the voter's registration movement.

She volunteered to care for the sick and ill by visiting hospitals and sewing. She died on February 2, 1965, in New York City.
