= M Street High School =

- U.S. National Register of Historic Places
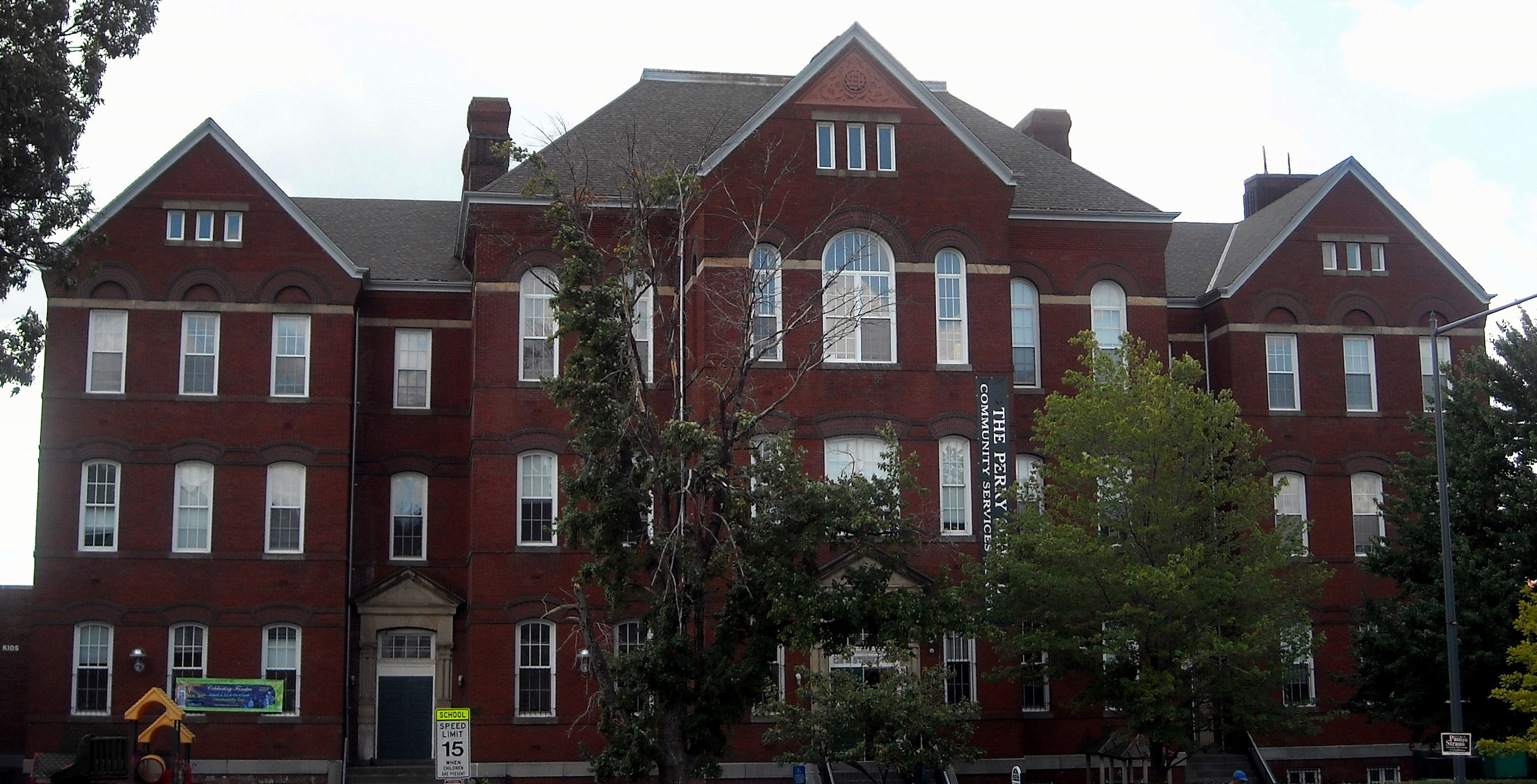

- Location within Washington, D.C.
- Location: 128 M St., NW; Washington, D.C.
- Coordinates: 38°54′19″N 77°00′48″W
- Built: 1891
- Architect: Thomas Entwistle
- Architectural style: Romanesque Revival
- NRHP reference No.: 86002924
- Added to NRHP: October 23, 1986

M Street High School, also known as Dunbar High School, is a historic former school building located in the Northwest Quadrant of Washington, D.C. It has been listed on the District of Columbia Inventory of Historic Sites since 1978 and it was listed on the National Register of Historic Places in 1986. The building escaped demolition with community support and the efforts of preservationists and is now a community center.

== History ==
The school was founded in 1870 as the Washington High School for Colored Youth, also called Washington High School.

Between 1870 and 1891 the school was located in several makeshift locations. In 1890, Congress appropriated $112,000 to build a permanent school and the building on M Street was then designed by Thomas Entwistle from the Office of Building Inspector and built from 1890–1891.

It was one of the nation's first high schools for African Americans and represents an important development of Washington's education system. The African American community had to fight for quality education in the city. The dual school system created disparities in facilities, grounds, architectural design and size. However, the school provided a rigorous curriculum and an extraordinary faculty because of the limited professional opportunities for African Americans. Principals at the school included Francis L. Cardozo, Sr., Robert H. Terrell and Anna J. Cooper. Among the many teachers was Carter G. Woodson who taught French, Spanish, English, and history, and Christian Fleetwood, a recipient of the Medal of Honor. The school produced a high percentage of college graduates, sending graduates to Harvard, Yale, and Brown, among other places, and its alumni included many prominent educators and public figures.

The high school was moved to a new building on a different site in 1916, when it was renamed Dunbar High School after the famous African-American poet Paul Laurence Dunbar. In 1919, the 128 M Street school building became the home of the M Street Junior High School, which was renamed Shaw Junior High School in 1921. Then in 1928, Shaw moved to the Mckinley Manual Technical School building at 7th and Rhode Island Avenue, NW.

From 1929 to 1932, the M Street High School building was used to house students from Cardozo High School. In 1932 it became M Street Junior High School, later named Terrell Junior High School. In 1952 it was renamed again as the Leon L. Perry Middle School, named for a principal, supervising principal and school board member of the black school system from 1914-1945. In 1954 the school was integrated. Shortly thereafter it was closed.

The building continued to find new life. In the 1960s it was used as a homeless shelter and food distribution center. In 1978 it was nominated for landmark status. At the time it was slated to be torn down to create a playground for students from nearby Terrell Junior High School, but following the landmark nomination the school board instead decided to preserve it.

In the 1980s the city tried to sell it to developers, but the local community sought to preserve it as a community asset. In 1986 it was placed on the National Register of Historic Places and in 1989, the D.C. school board approved the use of the vacant Perry School for a community service center.

In 1998 the building became home of the Perry School Community Services, Inc, a non-profit health and community service center.

== Notable alumni ==
- Sadie Tanner Mossell Alexander (1898-1989) — first African-American to earn a PhD in Economics and the first admitted to the Pennsylvania Bar
- Robert Percy Barnes (1898-1990) — Howard University professor and the first African American person to receive a PhD in chemistry from Harvard University
- Julia Evangeline Brooks (1882–1948) — educator, an incorporator of Alpha Kappa Alpha sorority
- Mary P. Burrill (1881–1946) — playwright, educator
- Nannie Helen Burroughs (May 2, 1879 — May 20, 1961) — educator and school founder
- Oscar James Cooper (1888–1972) — physician, co-founder of Omega Psi Phi fraternity
- Ford Dabney (1883–1958) — ragtime pianist, composer, jazz band leader
- Benjamin O. Davis Sr. (1877–1970) — first African-American U.S. Army general officer
- Eva Beatrice Dykes (1893–1986) — educator, first African-American woman to earn a doctorate
- James R. Europe (1880-1919) — African-American ragtime, jazz band leader, arranger, and composer
- Margaret Flagg Holmes (1886-1976) — educator, co-founder of Alpha Kappa Alpha sorority
- Charles Hamilton Houston (1895–1950) — civil rights attorney
- Sarah Meriwether Nutter (1888–1950) — educator, co-founder of Alpha Kappa Alpha sorority
- Horatio Nelson Poole (1884–1949) — painter, printmaker, muralist, teacher
- Hallie E. Queen (1880s-1940) — writer, teacher, Red Cross worker
- Willis Richardson (1889–1977) — playwright
- Francis E. Rivers (1893–1975) — New York lawyer, legislator and judge
- Hilyard Robinson (1899–1986) — modernist architect
- Carrie Snowden (1902–1906) — founder of Alpha Kappa Alpha sorority
- Jean Toomer (1894–1967) — African American poet and novelist commonly associated with the Harlem Renaissance
- Robert C. Weaver (1907-1997) — first African American Cabinet Secretary, United States Secretary of Housing and Urban Development
- Ionia Rollin Whipper (1872-1953) - Obsetrician and public health outreach worker
- Garnet C. Wilkinson (1879–1969) — educator

== Notable faculty ==
- G. David Houston (1880-1940) Professor of English at Howard University
- Anna Julia Cooper (1858-1964) Author of A Voice From the South, a treatise on Black women’s political theory
