= Ida Louise Jackson =

American educator and philanthropist

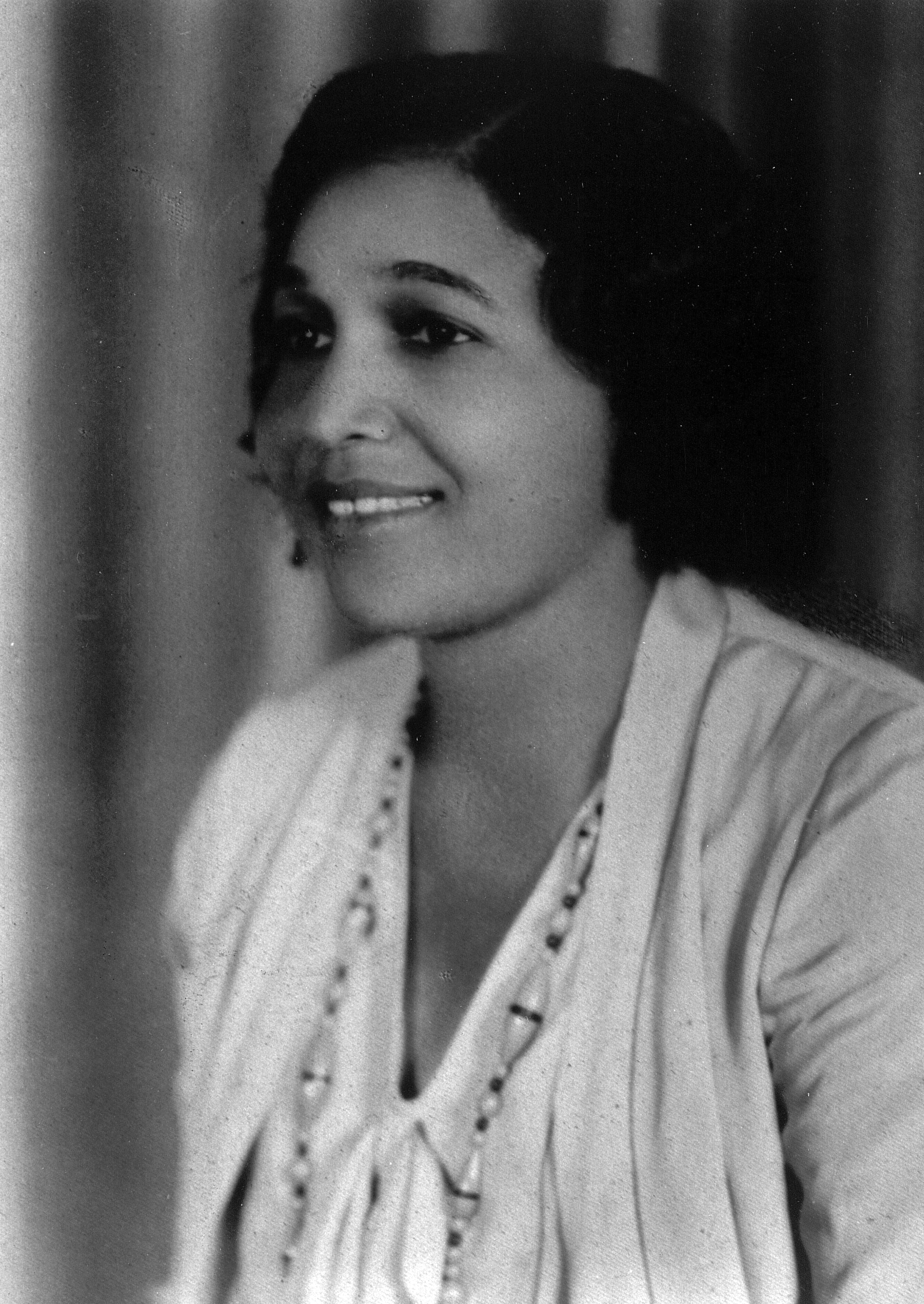
- Ida Louise Jackson, c. 1922
- Born: October 12, 1902; Vicksburg, Mississippi, US
- Died: March 8, 1996 (aged 93)
- Occupations: Educator, philanthropist

Ida Louise Jackson (October 12, 1902 – March 8, 1996) was an American educator and philanthropist. She attended and graduated from the University of California, Berkeley following her family’s move to California. As one of 17 Black students who attended the university at the time, Jackson prioritized creating safe spaces for African American community members. Throughout her undergraduate career, Jackson was invested in a teaching career, specifically in Oakland, California. Despite pushback from school administration, her dreams were finally realized in 1926 when she became the first African American woman to teach high school in the state of California. At the same time, her ambitions were rooted in giving back to her community back in Mississippi. Through the networks that she formed in California, Jackson returned to her home state in 1935 to develop programs around education and health care for poor, rural Black folks. Ida Louise Jackson’s contributions were celebrated by her alma mater when the University of California, Berkeley, named its first graduate apartment housing unit in her honor.

== Early life ==
Ida Louise Jackson was born in Vicksburg, Mississippi, on October 12, 1902. She was the daughter of Pompey Jackson and Nellie Jackson. Although a former slave born in Alabama, her father was a pastor and farmer. Her mother was born in New Orleans. Jackson was one of eight children, but was the youngest child and their only girl. At the young age of three, Jackson had learned to read and was permitted to go to school with her older brothers. By the time that she was eight, she was enrolled in Vicksburg’s Cherry Hill High School. She later graduated from high school at the age of eleven in 1914. Ida Louise Jackson attributed her love for education to her parents. In an interview with the Bancroft Library, as part of their Black Alumni series, Jackson recalls the time her father told her and her siblings to, “Get an education. It's the one thing the white man can't take from you.” Jackson spoke at length about the value of education that was instilled in her at a young age and her parents’ view of schooling increasing their access to opportunities. In addition, Jackson recalled that her time in the South was steeped in fear of racial violence—especially for the boys of the family. Jackson’s mother was fearful of what would happen to her sons, so she encouraged them to move to California in hopes of securing better jobs and a sense of safety in the West. While her brothers were in California, Jackson finished school. She attended Rust College as a boarding student, and trained as a teacher at Dillard University in New Orleans. By 1917, she had earned her Normal Teaching Diploma and certificate in home economics. In 1918, after the death of her father, and as participants in the first wave of the Great Migration, Jackson and her mother joined her brothers in Oakland, California.

== Education ==
Jackson had applied for teaching jobs in the Oakland Unified School District, but was denied. School officials had claimed that she was not qualified to teach. Instead of letting this stop her, Jackson enrolled at the University of California at Berkeley in 1920. At the time, she was one of the seventeen Black students at the university. Despite the low number of Black students on campus, Jackson emphasized in an interview that there was a strong sense of camaraderie between the few African American students. Jackson added that she and another student had opened up their homes for social gatherings since there were few places for Black students to be in community.

During her early years at Cal, she learned about the Alpha Kappa Alpha (AKA) sorority. She was impressed by the women of this organization and their strides in the field of education. Eager to create a safe space for Black women that also presented opportunities in education, Jackson worked to bring the Alpha Kappa Alpha sorority to Berkeley. She co-founded the Rho chapter of Alpha Kappa Alpha on Berkeley’s campus as the school’s first Black sorority. Many have incorrectly reported that the Kappa chapter of another sorority was first however, this is incorrect. None of the women were actual members of the other organization until September 1922. In 1922, Jackson earned a Bachelor of Arts Degree with a major in Education, Vocational Guidance, and Counseling. She then applied for a teaching position in the Oakland Public Schools, only to be told by administration that she was still not qualified. Determined to prove otherwise, she earned a Master of Arts Degree from the University of California, Berkeley, the following year.

Although Jackson was able to secure teaching positions following her master’s program, her love for education did not end. In the 1930s, she furthered her studies at Columbia University, pursuing a doctorate in education. In addition, she returned to the University of California to seek the Administrative Credential to be certified by the State of California as a School Administrator. By 1936, she was certified.

== Career ==
After receiving her Bachelor of Arts Degree from the University of California in 1922, Jackson applied to work in the Oakland School District. However, the administration at the time deemed her unqualified. As a result, she went back to the University of California to pursue a Master’s degree. Even after receiving these two degrees, Jackson recalled that the consensus of administrators was that a Black person was not qualified or experienced enough to teach in the school district. There were very few Black students who were promoted into Oakland high schools, so this meant most high schools in the district were predominantly white. Jackson’s appeals to work in these schools regardless were met with a response of more teaching experience being required. In 1923, Jackson moved to the Imperial Valley and accepted a teaching position at Eastside High School in El Centro, California. This school served predominantly Mexican and African American students. She remained at this school for two years as a home economics and English teacher. In accepting this job, Jackson became the first Black woman to teach high school in California.

Jackson spent two years teaching at this high school and was set on returning to Oakland to apply yet again. However, this time was different. On top of having two degrees from the University of California, Berkeley, she now had two years of teaching experience under her belt. She had met each question of her qualification with determination to prove herself. When she was told that she was unqualified after having a teaching credential and Bachelor’s, she then earned a Master’s degree. When administrators required that she have more teaching experience, she applied to teach in a neighboring school district for a couple of years. During this time, Ida Louise Jackson was also building a network of support. She was very involved with her local chapter of the National Association for the Advancement of Colored People (NAACP). Before submitting her intent for a teaching position in the Oakland Public School District for the third time, she spoke with her NAACP chapter members about the difficulties that she had encountered during her first applications. In doing so, she was connected with Walter Butler, who was the head of the Northern California branch of the NAACP. He was particularly helpful with Jackson’s situation as he had previously worked with influential members of the Board of Education. Other members of the NAACP also went on to endorse Jackson’s teaching abilities and qualifications.

Following these interventions by community members, Jackson officially submitted her third application for teaching in Oakland. In 1926, she received an offer for a long-term substitute teacher position at the Prescott School. Once she accepted this offer, she officially became the first African-American teacher in all of Oakland's public schools. After teaching at this school for a year, Jackson then went on to teach history at McClymonds High School. She spent the majority of her teaching career at this West Oakland high school. In 1934, she was featured in a local newspaper for her contribution to the launching of Negro History Week in California, specifically within her school district.

Throughout her teaching career, Jackson was also invested in giving back to the communities that supported her in college. In 1934, Jackson became the national Alpha Kappa Alpha president. Although her term ended in 1937, she was able to accomplish many things. Within this role, she organized chapters at schools all along the east coast. Under her leadership, chapters were founded in colleges in Los Angeles, Arizona, and Seattle. Her goals did not end there; she never forgot about her home state of Mississippi and the poor, rural Black folks that needed support. Before venturing out to Mississippi, she had established a low-cost dental clinic in Oakland. As part of her term, she led an initiative that provided summer schooling for rural teachers in 1934. The first established school was in Lexington, Mississippi and teachers from the AKA organization volunteered to help train local teachers and provide quality, comprehensive education to low-income students. Jackson hoped that by preparing teachers and students, more Black people would be interested in higher education.

With the help of Dr. Dorothy Boulding Ferebee and AKA volunteers, Jackson co-founded and became general director of the Mississippi Health Project. This was a system of clinics that aimed to address the health needs of rural Mississippi. As this project expanded, both adults and children were provided with health care. At first, this project had goals of establishing physical locations, but Jackson and her team quickly realized that community members had difficulty traveling to centers. In order to adapt to the needs of those they wished to serve, Jackson helped to evolve these centers into mobile clinics that would move throughout the area. As a result, Jackson and her team were able to provide greater access to their services. By the end of this project’s eight years of operation, over 15,000 children were immunized against diphtheria and smallpox. In addition, thousands of adults were provided with treatments and health screenings. Finally, the efforts by Jackson, Dr. Ferebee, and AKA volunteers were receiving national attention so much so that they were invited to the White House twice. They were allowed to speak with them President Roosevelt and the first lady about the specific challenges they had encountered while providing health care in the segregated South. In 1936, during their second visit to the White House, Jackson spoke on various issues with Eleanor Roosevelt covering topics such as health, federal jobs, and railway discrimination.

Following her time as the national AKA president, she took on a brief term as the dean of women at the Tuskegee Institute, from 1937 to 1938. Her main role within this position was to support the college with its recent change from an all-men’s school to including women. Finally throughout her time with all these projects and position changes, she was actively involved in the NAACP, the YWCA, and the National Council of Negro Women. She later returned to McClymonds High School where she taught until her retirement in 1953. Jackson then transitioned to running her family’s sheep ranch in Mendocino County.

== Personal life and legacy ==
Ida Louise Jackson paved the way for many. She was the first Black teacher in Oakland Public Schools and was the first Black woman certified to teach in the state of California. Some of Jackson’s written works include Development of Negro Children in Reference to Education (1923) and Librarians' Role in Creating Racial Understanding (1944).

Throughout her life, she was awarded many honors. She was listed in Who's Who Among Colored Americans in 1950. She was elected for membership in the Berkeley Fellows, the San Francisco Branch of the American Association of University Women, and the Alpha chapter of Phi Beta Kappa at the University of California, Berkeley. In 1971, she was granted the Berkeley Citation, which is the university’s highest honor. It recognizes the major contributions of individuals that exceed the highest values of the university.

In 1979, she donated her ranch to UC Berkeley and specified that the proceeds of its sale be used to develop and fund a graduate fellowship among Black students. In 2004, a graduate housing complex on College Avenue was named in her honor. Ida Louise Jackson died on March 8, 1996, aged 93. She is buried at the Mountain View Cemetery in Oakland.
