= Woolfolk =

Woolfolk is a surname. Notable people with the name include:

- Aaron Woolfolk (born 1969), American film director, screenwriter and producer
- Andre Woolfolk (born 1980), American football cornerback
- Andre Woolfolk (musician) (1950–2022), American flautist, percussionist, alto saxophone, tenor saxophone, and soprano saxophone player
- Austin Woolfolk (1796–1847), American slave trader
- Butch Woolfolk (born 1960), former American football running back and kick returner
- Corey Woolfolk (born 1983), American soccer forward who currently plays for the San Francisco Seals
- Donna Woolfolk Cross (born 1947), American writer and the author of the novel Pope Joan, about a supposed female Catholic Pope from 855 to 858
- Dorothy Woolfolk née Dorothy Roubicek (1913–2000), pioneering woman in the American comic book industry
- Elliott Woolfolk Major (1864–1949), American lawyer and Democratic politician from Pike County, Missouri
- Lewis Woolfolk (1896–?), American Negro league pitcher in the 1920s
- Marie Woolfolk Taylor (1893–1960), one of the sixteen founders of Alpha Kappa Alpha Sorority
- Tom Woolfolk (1860–1890), American man from Georgia who murdered nine members of his family in 1887
