= Linda White =

Linda White may refer to:

- Linda White (Alpha Kappa Alpha), American sorority president
- Linda White (politician), Australian politician
