= Alice Murray =

Founder of Alpha Kappa Alpha sorority

- Born: Alice Porter Murray; February 22, 1888; St. Louis, Missouri, US
- Died: July 14, 1957 (aged 69); Washington, D.C., US
- Education: Howard University
- Occupation: Teacher
- Employer: Sumner High School
- Known for: Founder of Alpha Kappa Alpha

Alice Porter Murray ( February 22, 1888 – July 14, 1957) was one of seven sophomore founders of Alpha Kappa Alpha sorority, the first sorority founded by African-American women, on January 15, 1908.

== Early life ==
Alice Murray was born in St. Louis, Missouri on February 22, 1888. Her father was Philip H. Murray, the founder of the Colored Kentuckian, editor and proprietor of the St. Louis Advance, and the president of the Afro-American Press Association. In Washington, D.C., her father published the Colored Citizen and was the inspector of public improvements under a board of public improvements. Her mother, Mary, died around 1897. During high school and college, Murray lived with her aunt and uncle on U Street in Washington, D.C.

Murray graduated from The Academy, Howard's preparatory school in 1906. She was admitted to Howard University and entered Howard Teachers College in 1906. During her collegiate years, she published several articles in Howard University Journal. On January 15, 1908, Murray participated in the founding of Alpha Kappa Alpha Sorority, the first sorority founded by African-American women. Murray hosted an Alpha Kappa Alpha banquet for new members at Howard University in November 1909.

On May 24, 1910, Murray graduated with a Teacher's Diploma and a B.A. in liberal arts and pedagogy.

== Career ==
From 1910 to 1914, Murray was a teacher at Sumner High School in Cairo, Illinois. She taught history, domestic science, and was the student newspaper advisor. Later, she taught English at the George Washington Carver High School and Junior College.

== Personal life ==
Murray married Milton L. D. Grant on July 27, 1914, in Baltimore, Maryland. Grant was a medical doctor. They initially lived on Florida Avenue in Washington, D.C. They had a daughter, Yvette, in 1919.

According to the 1930 United States census, the couple's fortune had changed during the Great Depression and their home had become a boarding house with eight roomers. She was listed as a "servant" and Grant as a carpenter. In May 1941, her husband filed for divorce because of desertion, claiming that she left him on November 26, 1930. At the time, she lived on Rhode Island Avenue, NW in Washington, D.C. Her daughter Yvette died in 1944. In 1946, Grant was charged and convicted of a wrongful death resulting from an illegal abortion.

She lost contact with the sorority after college. Murray died on July 14, 1957, in Washington, D.C.
