= Lottie Pearl Mitchell =

American clubwoman

- Lottie Pearl Mitchell, from a 1936 magazine
- Born: June 1883; Wilberforce, Ohio
- Died: September 6, 1974 (aged 91)
- Occupation(s): Social worker, clubwoman

Lottie Pearl Mitchell (June 1883 – September 6, 1974) was an American probation officer, civil rights activist, and clubwoman. She was a national vice-president of the NAACP, and the third national president of Alpha Kappa Alpha.

== Early life and education ==
Mitchell was born in Wilberforce, Ohio, the daughter of Samuel T. Mitchell and Amanda M. Mitchell. Her father was the president of Wilberforce University. She earned a bachelor's degree at Wilberforce, and studied music at Oberlin Conservatory, with further studies in sociology at Kalamazoo College.

== Career ==
Mitchell taught music as a young woman, and worked in military camps during World War I. She was the third national president (Supreme Basileus) of Alpha Kappa Alpha, serving from 1923 to 1925. She was an investigator and probation officer in Cleveland's juvenile court from 1926 until the 1940s. She was chair of the Pan-Hellenic Council of Cleveland from 1935 to 1936. From 1936 to 1937 she was president of the Cleveland chapter of the NAACP, and chaired a "Tolerance Day Program" at a Cleveland public pool in 1939, after incidents of racial antagonism at the site. In Ohio she was also a trustee of the Ohio Soldiers and Sailors Orphans Home, and active on the Mental Hygiene Council of Cleveland.

Mitchell held many national-level positions in the NAACP. She joined the national organization's executive board in 1936, was a national vice-president, and led national fundraising campaigns. She was described in a 1966 issue of The Crisis as "a dynamo of inspiration and leadership". It was reported after her death that she raised more than $40,000 for the work of the NAACP in her lifetime.

In her work with the NAACP, Mitchell endorsed the National Negro Congress, and raised funds for the Joint Scottsboro Defense Committee. In the 1960s, both connections brought her under the scrutiny of the Senate's Committee on the Judiciary, as suggesting possible Communist sympathies or other subversive ties.

== Personal life ==
Mitchell married Delbert Curtis in Columbus, Ohio, and enjoyed acting in community theatre productions. She moved to Los Angeles in 1962, and died in 1974, aged 91 years. The Western Reserve Historical Society has a collection of Mitchell's papers.
