= Philip H. Murray =

American newspaper publisher

- Born: 1842; Reading, Pennsylvania, U.S.
- Died: February 17, 1917 (aged 74–75); St. Louis, Missouri, U.S.
- Occupation: Newspaper publisher
- Family: Alice Murray, daughter

Philip H. Murray (1842 – February 17, 1917) was an abolitionist, journalist, phrenologist, and civil rights activist who spent most of his career in St. Louis, Missouri. He grew up in Reading, Pennsylvania, where he participated in the abolitionist movement in that region.

During the US Civil War he continued his work and served as a recruiting officer to help enlist blacks into the Union Army. After the war, he focused on journalism. In 1867, he established the first black newspaper in Kentucky, The Colored Kentuckian. He later moved to St. Louis where he continued to work in journalism and as an advocate for black education and civil rights. He was also the president of the first Negro Press Association.

== Early life ==
Philip Houston Murray (or Murry) was born in Reading, Pennsylvania in 1842. His parents were Samuel and Sarah Murray. His father was born a slave in Kent County, Maryland, on the Eastern Shore of that state. His mother was mixed black, Native American, and Irish. His mother's paternal grandfather reportedly was half African-American and half Native-American and paid for a woman to be brought from Ireland and made his wife. Philip's father considered schools for black children to be poor and Philip was only permitted to attend school for a week before he was put under private education by Father Patrick Keevil, a graduate of Minonth College, England. By the age of fifteen, Murray began to study physiology and the physical brain, which would influence his later work in phrenology. Philip reportedly had 13 brothers and sisters.

== Civil War ==
Before the American Civil War, Murray became involved in abolitionism and worked with many abolitionists of the era. He also delivered a series of well-received lectures on "Cerebral Physiology" throughout New England and was an active practitioner of phrenology. During the civil war, he spent some time travelling in the South and working as a correspondent for northern newspapers. He endeavored to organize a company to join the Union Army when General Robert E. Lee's Confederate forces invaded Pennsylvania, but was refused by Governor Andrew Gregg Curtin. In 1864, he was a delegate to the convention at Syracuse, New York, and was chosen chairman of the Pennsylvania delegation. That meeting was an important early meeting of the Colored Conventions Movement. He later did serve as a recruiting officer helping to enlist black soldiers.

== Threats of violence ==
After the war, Murray frequently gave speeches in the upper South on black education and progress. He also spoke out against the treatment of blacks in the South by former Confederates immediately after the Civil War. He was frequently threatened by whites in the South for his speeches.

On September 30, 1865, he had to flee a mob attack immediately before he was to give a speech at a meeting of black people in Franklin, Tennessee.

On May 11, 1867, Murray, together with James Mullins, G. W. Peabody, and a Captain Garner, gathered to give speeches in Pulaski, Tennessee. Murray's speech was reported to have elicited a mob against him that night, which was halted only by a large guard posted outside of Murray's room, although this was denied a week later in the Pulaski Citizen.

== Journalism and career ==
Murray continued to work in the newspaper business. Together with John Patterson Sampson and a Dr. Butler, he published the first black newspaper in Kentucky, The Colored Kentuckian in March 1867 in Louisville. In 1872, he published a paper called, Colored Citizen at Washington, DC. At about that time he held the position of inspector of public improvements under a board of public improvements.

Outside of journalism, he also worked as a teacher. During his life he taught school in Pennsylvania, Kentucky, Virginia, and Missouri. In 1876 he attended a convention of teachers at Jefferson City, Missouri, and was influenced to work to help hire black teachers and establishing black schools in St. Louis and throughout Missouri. He moved to Missouri that year and served under Chauncey Ives Filley in the Money Order Department of the Post Office and also worked for some time in the Comptrollers Office. He immediately started to fight to establish black schools and employ black teachers.

He continued his journalism work in St. Louis as a writer for The Truth, which he purchased in 1881 and changed the name to The Advance. The paper was published until about 1916. In 1879, he organized the St. Louis Colored Men's Land Association. In 1881, he was chairman of the Afro-American Press Association. Murray died in 1917, and in the last year of his life he was an editorial writer on the staff of the St. Louis Argus.

He also served as a delegate to state and national conventions of colored people, and together with Walter M. Farmer and Rev. J. H. Odin and with the support of Ida B. Wells, he started an Anti-Lynching Society in St. Louis in 1895.

== Later life ==
Murray was married and had one son and three daughters, including Alice Murray who graduated from Howard University. His wife died in about 1897. Murray died on February 14, 1917, after suffering for many years of asthma. His funeral was at St. Paul Chapel in St. Louis.
