= Barbara McKinzie =

American accountant and executive

Barbara Anne McKinzie
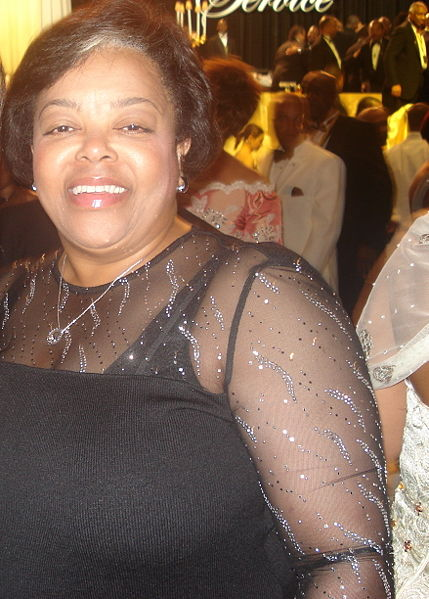
- Barbara A. McKinzie (undated photo)
- Born: January 2, 1954 (age 71); Ada, Oklahoma, U.S.
- Occupation: Accountant

Barbara Anne McKinzie (born January 2, 1954) is an American accountant and executive. From 2006 to 2010 she was the twenty-seventh International President of Alpha Kappa Alpha (ΑΚΑ), the first Greek-lettered sorority established and incorporated by African-American college women.

Born in Ada, Oklahoma, McKinzie has a B.S. degree from East Central University as well as an M.B.A. from Northwestern University. Before becoming president, she had various other roles in the sorority. She is a certified public accountant and a former Comptroller at the Chicago Housing Authority.

== Lawsuit to remove McKinzie ==
In July 2009, eight members of ΑΚΑ sued the sorority to have McKinzie removed as president. They alleged that she spent hundreds of thousands of dollars of organization funds on personal items, including jewelry and clothing. Further, the suit alleged that the ΑΚΑ board approved a "pension stipend" of $4,000 a month for four years after McKinzie leaves office without the necessary approval of members, and that a $1 million life insurance policy was purchased for her. McKinzie was also accused of spending $900,000 on a life-sized wax statue of herself. McKinzie responded that $45,000 was actually spent on statues of herself and the sorority's first International President, the late Nellie Quander. McKinzie said the expenses were "consistent with furthering ΑΚΑ's mission," and that the lawsuit was "without merit." The plaintiffs additionally claimed that under McKinzie ΑΚΑ lost large sums in investments. In October 2009, legal counsel for ΑΚΑ sent a letter to the plaintiffs' attorneys demanding that a web site supporting the lawsuit be removed from the Internet, but the web site, Friends of the Weeping Ivy, remained online.

After the lawsuit initially had been dismissed, a Washington D.C. appeals court found in favor of the plaintiffs and reinstated the suit. A subsequent audit led to findings which supported the assertions raised by the plaintiffs.

According to ΑΚΑ's website, McKinzie has been expelled from the sorority since 2016. The sorority won an arbitration award of $1.6 million against her, which was challenged by McKinzie in court. However, the appeals court affirmed the award in favor of the sorority.
