= Hallie E. Queen =

American writer and educator (1880s – 1940)

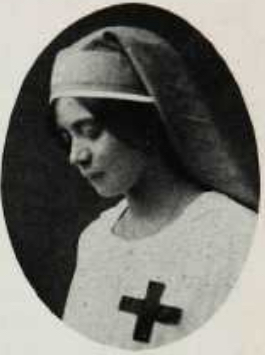
- Hallie E. Queen in Red Cross nurse's uniform, from the Howard University yearbook, 1918.
- Born: Hallie Elvera Queen; Washington, D.C.
- Died: October 9, 1940
- Other name: Hallie Q. Jackson (after second marriage)

Hallie Elvera Queen (1880s – October 9, 1940), later Hallie Queen Jackson, was an American writer, journalist, and educator. She taught English in Puerto Rico, and was on the faculty of Dunbar High School in Washington, D.C.

== Early life and education ==
Queen graduated from M Street High School in Washington, D.C. in 1904, then attended Cornell University, graduating in the class of 1908. She earned a master's degree in Spanish at Stanford University in 1925.

== Career ==
After college, Queen taught nature study at Tuskegee Institute, English in Puerto Rico, and English and Spanish in Virginia. In 1915, she supervised the summer school at the State College for Colored Students in Dover, Delaware. She was on the faculty at Dunbar High School in the 1920s and 1930s. During World War I, she chaired the American Red Cross auxiliary at Howard University; she held sewing events and organized student entertainment for black soldiers stationed at Fort Meade.

Queen was a relief worker in the aftermath of the East St. Louis riots in 1917, and testified about what she saw there, at a Congressional hearing. Around that time, she gave intelligence to the Military Intelligence Section of the War Department, on fellow black activists. She used her language skills as an interpreter for Latin American diplomatic gatherings in Washington. In 1928 she attended the American Council Institute of Pacific Relations meeting in New York City. In 1932, she successfully protested the wording of a railroad line's advertisements.

Queen corresponded with W. E. B. DuBois and Anson Phelps Stokes. She wrote for The Crisis, and the New York Age. She also wrote plays, including The Last Days of Pompeii and The Two Orphans.

== Personal life ==
Queen was a member of the Baha'i faith. She married Levi Thurman Anderson; they divorced in 1919. She married a second time, to Roosevelt L. Jackson, by 1929. She died in October 1940.
