= Claudio Costa (doctor) =

Italian medical doctor

Claudio Marcello Costa (born 20 February 1941, in Imola) is an Italian medical doctor and founder of the Mobile Clinic.

== Biography ==
Costa graduated in medicine on 3 March 1967 and over the next years achieved three specializations: in 1971 in clinical orthopaedics and traumatology, in 1973 in orthopaedic physical therapy, and in 1980 in sports medicine. He is the son of Checco Costa, who was one of the leading organisers of international motorcycle racing and the creator of the Imola circuit.

His commitment in rescuing riders starts right on the circuit of Imola, on 22 April 1957, when he saved the life of Geoff Duke, after a disastrous fall on the curve of the "mineral waters" while he was competing in the 500 class of the Golden Shell Cup on his Gilera. On that occasion, the young Claudio Costa managed to rescue Duke by dragging him from the track. He also removed Duke's bike from the course since it would have been a dangerous obstacle for other riders.

During the Imola 200, organized by his father in 1972, Claudio Costa and his young colleagues (all good friends and fans of motorcycling) volunteered to provide emergency first aid to the pilots in the event of a fall or a crash.

The innovative service became so popular that racers tried to convince the Dr. Costa and his team to follow them for the entirety of the championship. These young medics were so fond of motorbikes that – as Costa himself admitted – the team of doctors and physiotherapists was convinced "without too much toil". Among the first to realise the importance of having an expert on the track was Giacomo Agostini, who in 1974 wanted Dr. Costa at his side during the American debut at the Daytona 200.

During the first year the service was carried out by car to reach the various circuits with medical bag in tow, but in 1976 Dr. Costa to imagined a vehicle specially equipped for first aid. This innovative idea was suggested to Gino Amisano, who fully funded the initiative and then created the now famous and celebrated "Mobile Clinic".

For over thirty years Claudio Costa was a medical reference for motorcycle riders, recognised by fans, experts and commentators in the sport.
