= Pauline Sims Puryear =

American clubwoman

- Pauline Sims Puryear, from a 1926 magazine
- Born: Pauline J. Sims; June 6, 1900; Savannah, Georgia
- Died: August 2, 1971 (aged 71); Tallahassee, Florida
- Other name: Pauline Sims Puryear
- Occupations: Social worker, clubwoman, ordained minister
- Notable work: President of Alpha Kappa Alpha from 1925 to 1927

Pauline J. Sims Puryear (June 6, 1900 – August 2, 1971) was an American social worker and clubwoman, the fourth international president of the Alpha Kappa Alpha sorority, and Dean of Women at Florida A&M State College. (Her surnames are written with and without the hyphen in various sources.)

== Early life ==
Pauline J. Sims was born in Savannah, Georgia, the daughter of Felix R. Sims and Emma E. Griffin Sims. Her brothers David, George, and Yancey were all ordained ministers; one of them, David Henry Sims, was 55th bishop of the African Methodist Episcopal Church; his wife Mayme Holden Sims was also a church and community leader. Pauline Sims graduated from Howard University in 1918.

== Career ==
Puryear was the fourth international president of Alpha Kappa Alpha, serving from 1925 to 1927. As president of Alpha Kappa Alpha, she corresponded with W. E. B. Du Bois. She was a charter member of the sorority's first New Jersey chapter in 1934, along with Myra Smith Kearse. She and Kearse were also founding members of the College Women's Club of Union County.

In the 1940s and 1950s, Puryear was a social worker in Newark, New Jersey. She was ordained as a minister in the AME Church. She spoke at churches and at national and regional church conferences. She was an alternate delegate to the 1948 Republican National Convention from New Jersey. In 1962, she was Dean of Women at Florida A&M State College. In 1967, she was still active with Alpha Kappa Alpha, as head of the sorority's "Negro heritage project". In 1970, she helped launch a "black culture reading library" at the Pearl Street YWCA in Nashville, Tennessee.

== Personal life ==
Pauline J. Sims married Rev. Thomas Langston Puryear Sr., who was president of the Central Intercollegiate Athletic Association (CIAA). They lived in Belleville, New Jersey and had sons Thomas and Paul. Rev. Paul Lionel Puryear became a professor at Tuskegee University and Dean of African American Affairs at the University of Virginia. Her husband died in 1958; she died in 1971, in Tallahassee, Florida.

Her granddaughter Paula Puryear is a screenwriter.
