= Arnetta McKamey Wallace =

American community leader

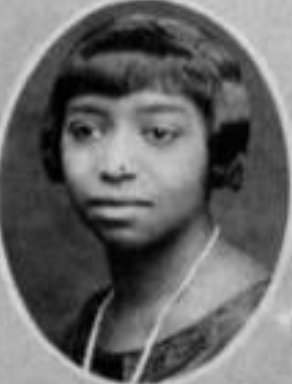
- Arnetta McKamey (later Wallace), from the 1926 yearbook of Knoxville College
- Born: Arnetta McKamey; October 19, 1904; Knoxville, Tennessee
- Died: January 13, 1995 (aged 90)
- Other names: Arnetta McKamey Gravely
- Occupation(s): International president, Alpha Kappa Alpha (1953-1958)

Arnetta McKamey Gravely Wallace (October 19, 1904 – January 13, 1995) was an American music educator and community leader, as the 14th international president of the Alpha Kappa Alpha sorority from 1953 to 1958.

== Early life and education ==
McKamey was born in Knoxville, Tennessee, the daughter of Lincoln McKamey and Charity Melinda Worthington McKamey. She graduated from Knoxville College in 1926.

== Career ==
Wallace was a music educator in Knoxville public schools, and a contralto singer, In 1933 she sang with the Knoxville College octet on a tour, including an appearance at the Diamond Jubilee of the United Presbyterian Church in Pittsburgh. She was vice-president of the Knoxville Education Association, and the first Black member of the Knoxville Girl Scout Council.

Wallace was the 14th international president (supreme basileus) of Alpha Kappa Alpha, serving from 1953 to 1958. She focused the organization's work on sickle cell research and international expansion during her tenure. She was chair of the National Pan-Hellenic Council, and was named Knoxville's "Negro Woman of the Year" in 1950. She was also the first vice-president of the National Council of Negro Women, and active in the YWCA. She was a lecturer with the National Council of Churches.

She traveled in Africa and was an honored guest at independence day festivities in Liberia.

== Personal life and legacy ==
McKamey married twice. Her first husband was Benjamin J. Gravely; they married in 1926. They separated by 1930. She married again to Robert C. Wallace, a Baptist clergyman and the dean of the Chicago Baptist Institute. Her second husband died in 1984, and she died in 1994, at the age of 90.
