= Lillie Burke =

Founder of Alpha Kappa Alpha

- Born: Hertford, North Carolina
- Died: December 16, 1949; Washington, D.C.
- Education: Howard University; University of Pennsylvania
- Occupation: Educator
- Known for: Founder of Alpha Kappa Alpha

Lillie Burke (died December 16, 1949) was an American woman who was one of the original founders of Alpha Kappa Alpha in 1908, the first sorority founded by African-American women. Burke and her sister Beulah Burke were two of the nine cofounders.

In her leadership as an educator and organizer, Burke created important social capital. The chapter Burke helped establish in Washington, D.C., helped support African-American women in the community in their leadership of the next generations in society.

Lillie Burke demonstrated in her work as an educator and active sorority member how African-American sororities supported women "to create spheres of influence, authority and power within institutions that traditionally have allowed African Americans and women little formal authority and real power."

== Early life ==
Born c. mid-1880s in Hertford, North Carolina, Burke moved with her family to Washington, DC. There she and her sister Beulah attended the Howard Preparatory School. They graduated in 1904, ready to enter Howard University later that year. It was a historically black college.

== Howard University ==
Lillie Burke was one of the sixteen founders (specifically one of the original group of nine founders) of Alpha Kappa Alpha sorority. She and her sister Beulah were instrumental in organizing the sorority. They also created its motto, as they were both accomplished Greek scholars.

Lillie Burke graduated from Howard University with a Bachelor of Arts in English. When she graduated from the top historically black college in the nation, it was a time when only 1/3 of 1% of African Americans and 5% of whites of eligible age attended any college. Burke went on to earn a graduate degree from the University of Pennsylvania.

== Career and community life ==
Burke had a long career as an educator in English in academic programs in public high schools, primarily in Washington, DC, where she worked for most of her career. She was also head of the academic department at Downing Institute in Pennsylvania. In North Carolina she taught at the State Normal School at Fayetteville to prepare new generations of teachers, which was considered one of the most important careers in the South.

Burke encouraged and taught generations of students through 30 years as an educator in the Washington, DC public school system. Although the schools were segregated, because the District of Columbia was then run directly by the Federal government, African-American teachers were paid at the same scale as white teachers. The system attracted highly qualified teachers, especially for Dunbar High School, the academic high school for African Americans.

After Burke returned to Washington in 1912, she helped charter the Xi Omega alumnae chapter of Alpha Kappa Alpha. She continued to contribute to the community through her activities with the sorority and her church. She died in Washington, D.C., in 1949.
