= Marie Woolfolk Taylor =

Alpha Kappa Alpha founder (1893–1960)

- Born: December 18, 1893; Atlanta, Georgia, U.S.
- Died: November 9, 1960 (aged 67); Atlanta, Georgia
- Occupations: founder of Alpha Kappa Alpha sorority; Social Service Worker
- Spouse: Dr. Alfred Taylor
- Children: Alfred Marie Taylor

Marie Woolfolk Taylor (December 18, 1893 - November 9, 1960) was one of the sixteen founders of Alpha Kappa Alpha sorority, the first sorority founded by African-American women.

Woolfolk did post-graduate study in the new field of social work and returned to Atlanta for her career. She worked as a social worker and probation officer, and chaired numerous civic groups, readily handling financial responsibilities. She was on the board of directors of a range of charities. Woolfolk considered herself mostly a social worker, but she also worked as an educator at night school.

With her commitment to community service and strong leadership in activities in a segregated city, Woolfolk demonstrated how sororities could help women prepare "to create spheres of influence, authority and power within institutions that traditionally have allowed African Americans and women little formal authority and real power."

== Early life ==
Marie Woolfolk was born in Atlanta, Georgia. She attended Storrs School until graduation. This was one of the classical academic schools established in Atlanta for freedmen by missionaries from New England after the Civil War. For one semester, Woolfolk attended Atlanta University to concentrate on higher level work. She entered Howard University's Preparatory School in 1901, from which she graduated in 1904. Woolfolk then felt prepared to tackle Howard University, the top historically black college in the nation. It was a time when only 1/3 of 1% of African Americans and 5% of whites of eligible age attended any college.

== Howard University and founding of Alpha Kappa Alpha ==
In her later years as a college student at Howard, Woolfolk was heavily involved in planning Alpha Kappa Alpha. She helped design elements of the sorority in 1907. Together with Ethel Hedgeman Lyle, Woolfolk made official presentations in 1907 about the sorority to gain approval of Howard University officials — university president Wilbur P. Thirkield and deans Lewis Moore and Kelly Miller. She attended the inaugural meeting on January 15, 1908 and helped draft the sorority's first constitution and bylaws. Woolfolk invited seven sophomores to participate in the sorority so they could begin expansion. On February 21, Woolfolk was elected the first secretary of Alpha Kappa Alpha.

In addition, Woolfolk maintained an excellent academic record. She was a lyric soprano with the Howard University Chorus and participated in drama as well. Woolfolk graduated with a Bachelor of Arts in English, magna cum laude, with honors in Latin and history.

== Career and later life ==
After graduating from Howard, Woolfolk enrolled at Cleveland, Ohio's Schauffler Training School for Social Service, where she majored in religion. At Schauffler Training School, Woolfolk was the only African-American student. Social work was a new field for the nation.

After graduation, Woolfolk moved back to Atlanta. She gained a position as community assistant to the pastor of the First Congregational Church, the second oldest Black Congregational Church in the nation. For seven years, she served in this position. Woolfolk also acted as a probation officer, working with delinquent girls for the City of Atlanta. She taught adult classes at night school. For four years, Woolfolk was the head of inspection for the African-American legal company Standard Life Insurance Company, which grew to be a major business in Atlanta.

In her various positions, Woolfolk was among the first in her generation to be a social worker, as the new field was called. It developed as a progressive movement to help with massive social changes resulting from increased migration into cities, from the South to the North, and increased immigration from Europe. During the Great Atlanta Fire on May 21, 1917, Woolfolk was one of two African Americans who assisted the Red Cross.

In 1919, Woolfolk married Dr. Alfred G. Taylor and bore a daughter named Alfred Marie.

Taylor was involved in leading a range of civic-related activities in Atlanta. She helped to organize the Community Chests, which preceded what is now the United Way. She chaired the Finance Committee of the YWCA. Taylor was on the board of directors of the Carrie Steele-Pitts Foster Home and the Community Planning Council. She was also an active member of the NAACP and the First Congregational Church.

Continuing her involvement with Alpha Kappa Alpha, in 1923 Marie Taylor was chartering president of Atlanta's Kappa Omega alumnae chapter. She worked with this group to build the sorority's network among graduates in the city.

Marie Woolfolk Taylor died in Atlanta, Georgia, on November 9, 1960.
