= Carrie Snowden =

American sororiety founder

- Born: Carrie Estelle Snowden; 1884; Pennsylvania, U.S.
- Died: 1948 (aged 59–60); Washington, D.C., U.S.
- Occupation: Switchboard operator
- Known for: Founder of Alpha Kappa Alpha sorority;

Carrie Estelle Snowden (c. 1884 – 1948) was one of the founders of Alpha Kappa Alpha sorority, the first sorority founded by African-American women.

== Early life ==
Snowden was born in Pennsylvania c. 1884. She grew up in Washington, D.C., where she attended public schools. In June 1902, she graduated eighth grade at the Lincoln School and was promoted to high school. In June 1906, she graduated from M Street High School where she served as her class vice president.

She enrolled in Howard University in the School of Arts and Science in 1906. There were only a few women enrolled in Howard at the time. She graduated from Howard with a B.A. in May 1910, having studied English, French, German, and history.

== Alpha Kappa Alpha ==
While at Howard, she and fifteen other women formed Alpha Kappa Alpha sorority. Snowden was admitted to the sorority without initiation in February 1908. She served as the epistoleus (corresponding secretary) of what became the Alpha chapter of the sorority in the fall of 1909.

In 1923, Snowden was a charter member of Xi Omega alumnae chapter of Alpha Kappa Alpha in Washington, D.C. She was active in its membership and amenities committees.

== Career ==
In 1917, Snowden was appointed a substitute librarian for high schools and normal schools in Washington, D.C. Later in life, Snowden worked in administration at Howard University as a switchboard operator until she retired.

== Personal life ==
Snowden and Silas Hinton married on January 4, 1906, in Washington, D.C.

Snowden's job at the university allowed her to take classes there. She pursued lifelong learning, taking courses in a wide range of subjects such as commerce, economics, mathematics, and social work. In 1943, she took a course in typing at Howard.

Snowden died in 1948 in Washington, D.C. She was buried in Washington, D.C. Her sorority friends remembered her as "small, slim, and gracious".
