= Lavinia Norman =

Alpha Kappa Alpha founder (1882–1983)

- Born: December 14, 1882; Montgomery, West Virginia, United States
- Died: January 22, 1983 (aged 100); Washington, D.C., United States
- Occupations: founder of Alpha Kappa Alpha sorority; English, French, and Latin teacher
- Parent(s): Thomas Norman and Virginia Thomas

Lavinia Norman (December 14, 1882 - January 22, 1983) was one of the nine original founders of Alpha Kappa Alpha sorority, the first sorority founded by African-American women, at Howard University. In addition Norman did graduate work and taught at Douglas High School in Huntington, West Virginia, for more than 40 years. When teaching was considered one of the most critical and prestigious careers for a developing nation.

A devoted educator, Norman was a charter member of the Beta Tau Omega chapter of Alpha Kappa Alpha in Huntington.

== Early life ==
Born as the eighth of sixteen children to Thomas Norman and Virginia Thomas, Lavinia Norman grew up in Montgomery, West Virginia. Her elementary years were spent in West Virginia. When her father got a job with the Postal Service, Norman's family moved to Washington, D.C. In 1901, she started secondary work at Howard University's Preparatory School. She graduated in 1905 with a diploma.

== Howard University and founding of Alpha Kappa Alpha ==
Lavinia Norman entered Howard University, the top historically black college in the nation, at a time when only 1/3 of 1% of African Americans and 5% of whites attended any college.

Norman drafted the constitution for Alpha Kappa Alpha with Margaret Flagg and Ethel Hedgeman. After the sorority was founded on January 15, 1908, Norman expanded the activities of Alpha chapter at Howard University. As a senior in 1909, she succeeded Ethel Hedgeman as head of AKA. Norman helped to plan ceremonies for the second Ivy Day celebration at the university. Norman graduated cum laude with degrees in French and English in 1909.

== Teaching ==
After graduating from Howard, Norman returned to West Virginia. There she taught Latin, French, dramatic arts, and English at Douglass High School in Huntington. In 1934 she earned a second Bachelor of Arts degree at West Virginia State College.

In 1950, Norman retired after forty years in education, having taught generations of students. During her tenure as teacher, she acted as coach for the high school's drama team and was the adviser to the school's newspaper.

She was also active in Alpha Kappa Alpha, in the Beta Tau Omega chapter in Huntington.

== Later life ==
After retiring from teaching, Norman returned to Washington, D.C., where she affiliated with Alpha Kappa Alpha's Xi Omega chapter. In 1978, Norman was honored at the 70th celebration of the sorority's founding. The sorority unveiled a window honoring her and 19 other founders was unveiled in Rankin Chapel at Howard University. The sorority also helped to celebrate her 100th birthday.

Having served Alpha Kappa Alpha for more than 75 years, Lavinia Norman died on January 22, 1983, as the last original founder.
