= Margaret Flagg Holmes =

Alpha Kappa Alpha founder

- Born: September 6, 1886; Durham, North Carolina, U.S.
- Died: January 29, 1976 (aged 89); New York, NY, U.S.
- Occupations: founder of Alpha Kappa Alpha sorority; English and Latin teacher
- Spouse: John Clay Holmes (m. 1917–1946)
- Parent(s): Rev. Lewis Flagg and Callie McAdoo

Margaret Flagg Holmes (September 6, 1886 – January 29, 1976) was one of the sixteen founders of Alpha Kappa Alpha sorority, at Howard University in Washington, DC. It was the first sorority founded by African-American women.

She went on to earn a Master's in Philosophy at Columbia University in New York. Holmes devoted her energies to teaching academic, or college preparatory, curriculum at the high school level for more than thirty years, mostly in Chicago, Illinois. She was voted "Best Latin Teacher" in the entire city. There Holmes distinguished herself further by leading the history department at Du Sable High School for several years, an unusual leadership role for any woman in those times.

In addition, Holmes served as president and vice-president of the Theta Omega chapter of Alpha Kappa Alpha in Chicago, where she was active for more than 30 years in programs for education and health. She also was active with the NAACP and the YWCA. Margaret Holmes demonstrated in her work as an educator and civic activist how African-American sororities supported women "to create spheres of influence, authority and power within institutions that traditionally have allowed African Americans and women little formal authority and real power."

== Early life ==
Born in Durham, North Carolina to Reverend Lewis and Callie (McAdoo) Flagg, Margaret Flagg attended elementary school in the city's public school system. After her family moved to Washington, D.C., Margaret attended M Street High School (later called Dunbar High School), one of the city's academic high schools, where she graduated in 1904. Her ability was recognized by Howard University with the award of a scholarship. Flagg's ambition and abilities were demonstrated by her going to Howard at a time when only 1/3 of 1% of African Americans and 5% of whites of eligible age attended any college. Howard was the top historically black college in the nation.

== College life and the establishment of Alpha Kappa Alpha Sorority ==
In September 1904, Margaret started at Howard University, where she majored in Latin, history, and English. With Ethel Hedgeman and Lavinia Norman, Margaret helped to plan the sorority by refining their first constitution, drafted by Lucy Diggs Slowe. She was among the nine African American women students who founded the sorority on January 15, 1908.

== Career ==
At a time when many women taught primary school, Margaret Holmes earned advanced degrees and taught in academic high schools. In addition, she headed an academic department for years.

For nine years, Flagg served as a history, Latin and English teacher at the same Baltimore high school as fellow founder Lucy Diggs Slowe. By studying during summers, Flagg earned a Master of Arts degree in philosophy in 1917 from Columbia University in New York.

On August 1, 1917, Flagg married John Clay Holmes. The couple moved to Chicago, Illinois, where she returned to teaching in 1922. Holmes first taught Latin at Wendell Phillips High School, the first secondary school for African Americans in Chicago. It attracted talented teachers and students. Holmes earned recognition as "Best Latin Teacher of the City" by the North Central Association.

As the school expanded, it was renamed Du Sable High School. Margaret Holmes headed the history department for several years, until 1931. Such a position of leadership at the high school level was unusual for women educators of the time. Holmes was an educator for more than 30 years, until 1953, teaching generations of students.

== Civic and Alpha Kappa Alpha involvement ==
In Chicago, Margaret Holmes participated in the NAACP and the YWCA. Through her civic work relating to civil rights, Holmes collaborated with national NAACP leaders Dr. W. E. B. Du Bois, Mary White Ovington, and Dr. Joel Elias Spingarn.

For more than thirty years, from 1922 to 1953, Margaret Holmes was active in Chicago's Theta Omega alumnae chapter of Alpha Kappa Alpha. She served as the vice-president and president of the chapter. Both the chapter and national organization raised funds in the 1920s and 1930s for scholarships, and contributed to the NAACP and Urban League. They worked to support education for African Americans and gain civil rights. Holmes helped serve the African American community through challenges of the Great Depression and the Great Migration, when Southern blacks arrived in Chicago at the rate of 5,000 per week.

After her move later in life to New York, Holmes became a member of the Tau Omega chapter of Alpha Kappa Alpha. In total, she worked with the sorority for over sixty years.

With her husband John, Margaret traveled across the United States and Canada. In Paris, France, Margaret met the famous African American dancer Josephine Baker. The Holmes couple were received by Pope Pius XI in 1931. After her husband died in 1946, Margaret Holmes moved to New York City to live with her sister. Holmes died on January 29, 1976, aged 89.
