= Clinica Mobile =

Emergency facility for motorcycle race injuries

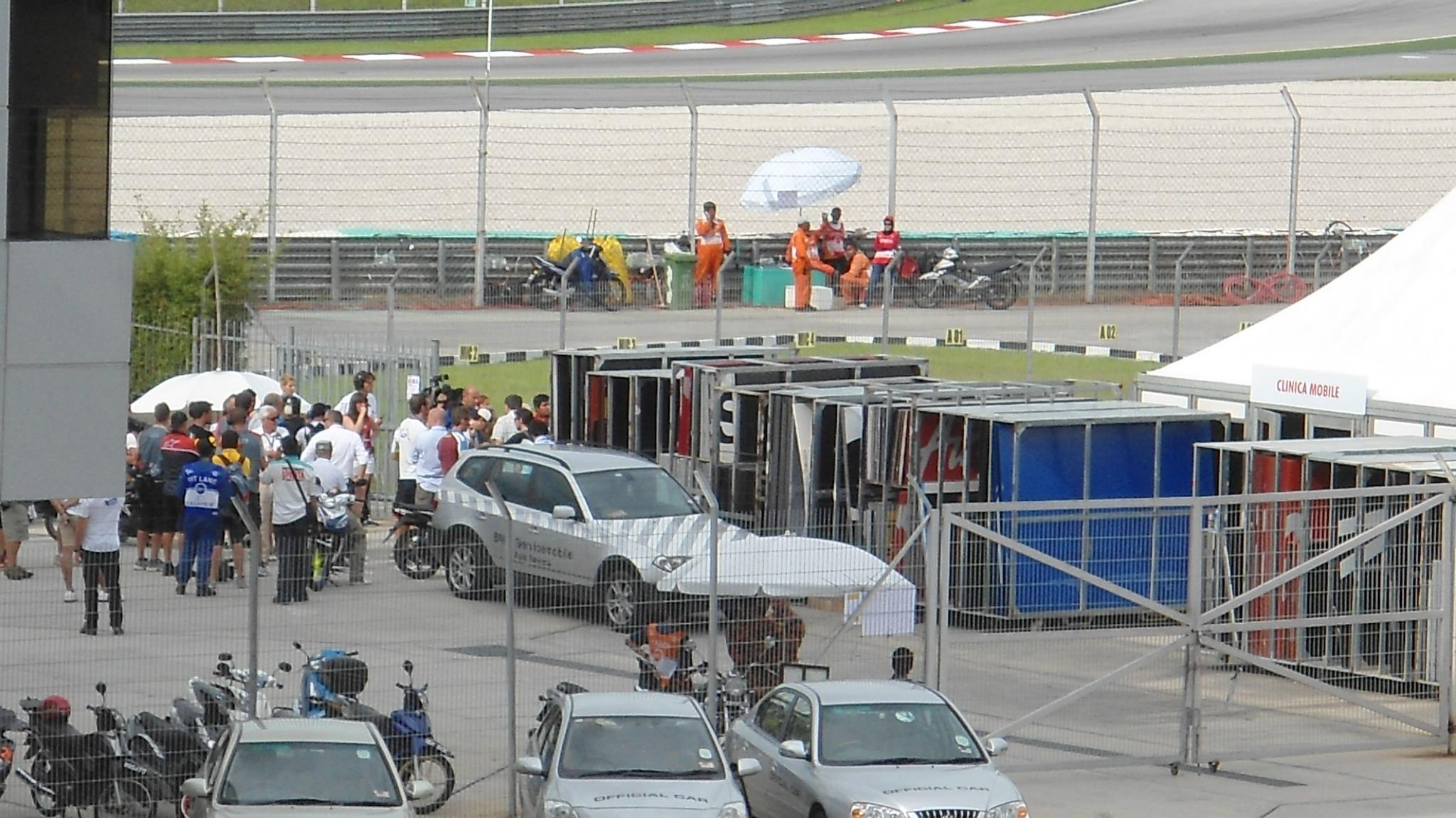
The Mobile Clinic in Sepang, (Malaysia), after the fatal accident of the Italian rider Marco Simoncelli happened in 2011

The Clinica Mobile ("Mobile Clinic") is a medical emergency facility, created by Dr. Claudio Costa to rescue riders injured during motorcycle races. In 1976, on Costa's initiative and with funding from Gino Amisano, founder and owner of the AGV, the first vehicle specifically designed to provide rapid medical intervention to injured riders still on the track.

The mobile clinic began on the race of the World Championship in Motorcycle Grand Prix of Austria, in Salzburg on 1 May 1977. During the race for the Class 350, Patrick Fernandez, Franco Uncini, Hans Stadelmann, Dieter Braun and Johnny Cecotto were involved in a terrible accident at the fast curve at Fahrerlager. The clinic intervened, but were attacked by police dogs. The doctors persevered and their actions saved Uncini's life. Stadelmann died on the spot and Braun ended his career because of a serious eye injury.

The mobile clinic became an institution on the motorcycle racing circuit, helping thousands of riders.
