= Dorothy Boulding Ferebee =

American obstetrician and activist (1898–1980)

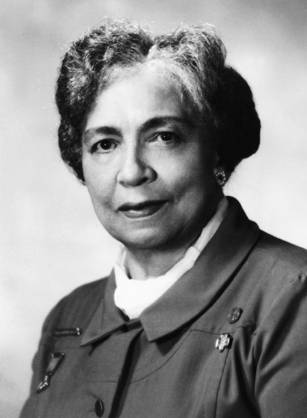
- Born: Dorothy Celeste Boulding; October 10, 1898; Norfolk, Virginia, U.S.
- Died: September 14, 1980 (aged 81); Washington, D.C., U.S.
- Education: Simmons College; Tufts University Medical School
- Spouse: Claude Thurston Ferebee (m. 1930)
- Children: 2
- Scientific career
- Fields: Obstetrics, gynecology
- Workplaces: Howard University Medical School; Women's Institute; Mississippi Health Project; Alpha Kappa Alpha

Dorothy Celeste Ferebee (née Boulding; October 10, 1898 – September 14, 1980) was an American obstetrician and civil rights activist.

Born in a middle-class family in Norfolk, Virginia, Boulding grew up in Boston, where she attended The English High School and Simmons College before studying medicine at Tufts University. Prevented by racism and segregation from continuing her career at Boston's white hospitals, she took a job at the Freedmen's Hospital in Washington D.C., where she became an obstetrician and promoted contraception and sex education. She married Claude Thurston Ferebee, a professor of dentistry, in 1930.

Ferebee was director of the Mississippi Health Project, which provided healthcare to impoverished farmers in the state, from 1935 to 1942. She was an active participant in the movements for the rights of black Americans and of women. As president of the National Council of Negro Women, she issued a "Nine Point Programme" against racism and misogyny in American public life. She was involved with several international development organisations, including UNICEF, the International Council of Women and the World Health Organization.

== Background and early life ==
Dorothy Celeste Boulding was born on October 10, 1898, in Norfolk, Virginia. While she was young, her mother, Florence Boulding, became ill and sent her and her brother, Ruffin, to live with her great-aunt in Boston, Massachusetts. Dorothy and Ruffin grew up in the middle-class neighborhood of Beacon Hill. Her great-aunt's family included eight attorneys, and discussions about law dominated the household, but Boulding later wrote that she had always wanted to be a doctor. As a child, she tried to act as "doctor" to ailing and injured animals.

=== Education ===
Boulding attended school in Boston from 1904 until 1908, when she moved to The English High School, graduating at the top of her class in 1915. She subsequently attended Simmons College in Boston, where she became a member of the Epsilon Chapter of the Alpha Kappa Alpha sorority and graduated in 1920. In the same year, she entered medical school at Tufts University School of Medicine, from which she graduated in 1924 among the top five in her class. In 1927, she was one of nine women to pass the District of Columbia medical exam.

== Medical career ==
Despite her degree from Tufts and her high ranking amongst her class, Boulding was not allowed to intern at white hospitals in the Boston area. She moved to Washington, D.C., and started her internship at the black-owned and black-staffed Freedmen's Hospital. She worked at the Freedmen's Hospital as an obstetrician, where she began promoting contraception and sex education to women, both highly controversial topics at the time.

Upon completing her internship in 1925, she began her own medical clinic in an impoverished part of the city. To improve healthcare in the neighborhood, she persuaded the trustees of the Friendship House, a charitable segregated medical center, to open an additional clinic for African Americans. This clinic was later named Southeast Neighborhood House. She further set up the Southeast Neighborhood Society, which contained a playground and daycare for the children of working mothers. In the same year, she joined the faculty of Howard University Medical School where she was appointed medical physician to women. In 1930, she married Claude Thurston Ferebee, a professor in Howard University College of Dentistry. In 1949, she was named medical director for Howard's health services, a post she held until her retirement in 1968.

== Charitable and civil rights activism ==
As National President of Alpha Kappa Alpha, Ferebee directed the Mississippi Health Project, a project sponsored by the Alpha Kappa Alpha sorority to provide healthcare to sharecropper families in Holmes County, Mississippi throughout the summers of 1935 to 1942. She additionally became an active member of the civil rights movement as a member of the National Council of Negro Women (NCNW). In the fall of 1949, she was elected president of the organization. Here, she augmented the organization's efforts to promote healthcare, and education, and continued its work to end discrimination against African Americans and women in the military, housing, employment, and voting. As president of NCNW, she issued her "Nine Point Program" which outlined a plan to achieve fundamental civil rights through educational and legislative initiatives. Through all this, Boulding remained a full-time obstetrician.

Ferebee served on the boards of the White House's Children and Youth Council, as well as the United Nations Children's Fund (UNICEF). She was selected by the U.S. State Department as a delegate to the International Council of Women of the World in Greece. The Department of Labor's Women's Bureau named her to a delegation that observed the impact of postwar conditions on women and children in Germany. She was appointed to the Council for Food for Peace by US president John F. Kennedy in the 1960s, in which capacity she spent five months travelling in Africa and speaking on preventative medicine.

In 1963, she traveled to Selma, Alabama as part of a campaign to register African Americans to vote. Here, she also spoke on behalf of women's rights. In 1967, Boulding was appointed as one of the five U.S. delegates to the World Health Organization's twentieth assembly in Geneva as well as the D.C. Commission on the Status of Women, which she chaired from 1971 to 1974. She was also a board member of the American Association of University Women.

== Personal life ==
Dorothy and Claude Ferebee had twins: a son named Claude and a daughter named Dorothy. Dorothy died at the age of eighteen, from influenza.

Ferebee died from congestive heart failure on September 14, 1980, at Georgetown University Hospital in Washington, D.C.

== Works cited ==
- American Association of University Women (2022-03-10). "Dorothy Boulding Ferebee: A pioneer in civil rights and Health Care".
- Brandman, M. (2021). "Biography: Dorothy Boulding Ferebee". National Women's History Museum.
- Mack, Dwayne (2007-06-27). "Dorothy Celeste Boulding Ferebee (1898–1980)". Archived from the original on 2023-02-06.
- National Institutes of Health (2015-06-03). "Changing the face of medicine: Dorothy Celeste Boulding Ferebee". U.S. National Library of Medicine. Archived from the original on 2023-05-07.
- Parker, Marjorie H (1990). Alpha Kappa Alpha through the Years 1908-1988. Mobium Press.
