= Linda White (Alpha Kappa Alpha) =

President of Alpha Kappa Alpha (1942–2010)

Linda Marie White
- Born: April 21, 1942; Cleveland, Ohio, U.S.
- Died: February 27, 2010 (aged 67)

Linda Marie White (April 21, 1942 – February 27, 2010) was Alpha Kappa Alpha's twenty-sixth International President, who served from 2002 to 2006. The daughter of a Pullman porter, she was born in Cleveland, Ohio, and grew up in the Washington Heights neighborhood on Chicago's South Side. She graduated from Parker High School, and entered Clark College, graduating with a Bachelor of Arts in political science. White attained a Master of Arts in political science from the University of Chicago.

White served as the director of the Social Security system in northern Ohio.

== 2002–2006 administration ==
White began her position as international president in 2002. While in this position, she implemented the S.P.I.R.I.T. theme which was a program that consisted of initiatives related to health, the African-American family, arts, economics and education. Among other accomplishments, White was also instrumental in implementing the Ivy Reading AKAdemy and the Young Authors Program during her administration. While she was president of the sorority, there were problems during initiation rites at a suspended branch of the Kappa Alpha Sorority. In a 2005 meeting of the sorority White noted the achievements of the group, particularly emphasizing the hours of volunteer service and funds raised.

While president of Alpha Kappa Alpha, White met with Hillary Clinton during Clinton's period as a senator of New York.

== Awards and honors ==
In 2003, White received the "Spirit of Maynard Jackson" award.
