= Alpha Kappa Alpha =

International historically African American collegiate sorority

- ΑΚΑ
- Founded: January 15, 1908; 118 years ago Howard University
- Type: Social
- Affiliation: NPHC
- Status: Active
- Emphasis: African-American
- Scope: International
- Motto: "By Culture and By Merit"
- Colors: Salmon Pink; Apple Green
- Symbol: Ivy leaf
- Flower: Pink Tea Rose
- Publication: Ivy Leaf
- Chapters: 1,085
- Members: 90,000 active 365,000+ lifetime
- Nicknames: AKAs, Alpha Women, Ivies
- Headquarters: 5656 S. Stony Island Avenue; Chicago, Illinois 60637; United States
- Website: www.aka1908.com

Alpha Kappa Alpha Sorority, Incorporated (ΑΚΑ) is a historically African-American sorority. The sorority was founded in 1908 at Howard University in Washington, D.C.. Incorporated in 1913, the sorority is a member of the National Pan-Hellenic Council (NPHC), a group of historically Black fraternities and sororities often called the Divine Nine.

Currently, Alpha Kappa Alpha had more than 365,000 members in 1,085 chapters in the United States and eleven other countries. Women may join through undergraduate chapters at a college or university, or graduate chapters after acquiring an undergraduate or an advanced college degree.

== History ==
Miner Hall (left) and Main Hall in 1868. Miner Hall was the site of Alpha Kappa Alpha's founding on January 15, 1908. Miner Hall was demolished in 1961.

=== Beginnings: 1907–1912 ===
In spring 1907, student Ethel Hedgeman Lyle led efforts to create a sorority at Howard University in Washington, D.C.. Forming a sorority broke barriers for African-American women in areas where they had little power or authority due to a lack of opportunities for Black Americans in the early 20th century. Faculty member Ethel T. Robinson encouraged Hedgeman by relating her observations of sorority life at the Women's College at Brown University. Hedgeman began recruiting interested classmates; the group used the summer of 1907 to research and explore options for their new organization.

In November 1907, Hedgeman and Marie Woolfolk Taylor gave a presentation to the university's administration to secure approval for a sorority, which was granted immediately. Thus, Alpha Kappa Alpha became the first sorority member of the National Pan-Hellenic Council to be created at a historically black college or university. Nellie Quander was selected as the sorority's first International president after Incorporation.

On January 15, 1908, the nine founders held the first official business meeting of Alpha Kappa Alpha in Miner Hall. On February 21, 1908, seven additional sophomores were admitted to the sorority without initiation and were also given a status as founders. During the first few months, Alpha Kappa Alpha created rituals, held social events, and made presentations for the general public. On May 1, 1908, members planted ivy and a tree on the Howard campus. This practice was later adopted by the university and continued for decades.

The sorority's first initiation was held in a wing of Miner Hall at Howard University on February 11, 1909. On May 25, 1909, Alpha Kappa Alpha held its first Ivy Day, a celebration that included planting ivy at Miner Hall. The sorority established many service efforts, including helping to create the NAACP and the YWCA D.C. chapter, feeding the hungry, tutoring, and clothing people experiencing poverty.

=== Incorporation: 1912–1913 ===
By the end of the 1911–12 school year, Alpha Kappa Alpha had more than forty members at Howard. In October, former president Nellie Quander was invited to attend a sorority meeting. In this meeting, the active members proposed changing the sorority's name, colors, and symbols. Quander opposed the changes, advising the students that they had no right, legally or ethically, to make such changes. Quander advised them to hold a poll of the entirety of the sorority. That poll found that the vast majority did not favor the change.

Some of the undergraduate members who favored the changes held a meeting the next month with other collegiate women and voted to reorganize the group and incorporated the changes, forming another organization, Delta Sigma Theta. Quander set up a committee to incorporate Alpha Kappa Alpha to ensure the organization's continuation. Alpha Kappa Alpha became the first African-American sorority to incorporate nationally on January 29, 1913.

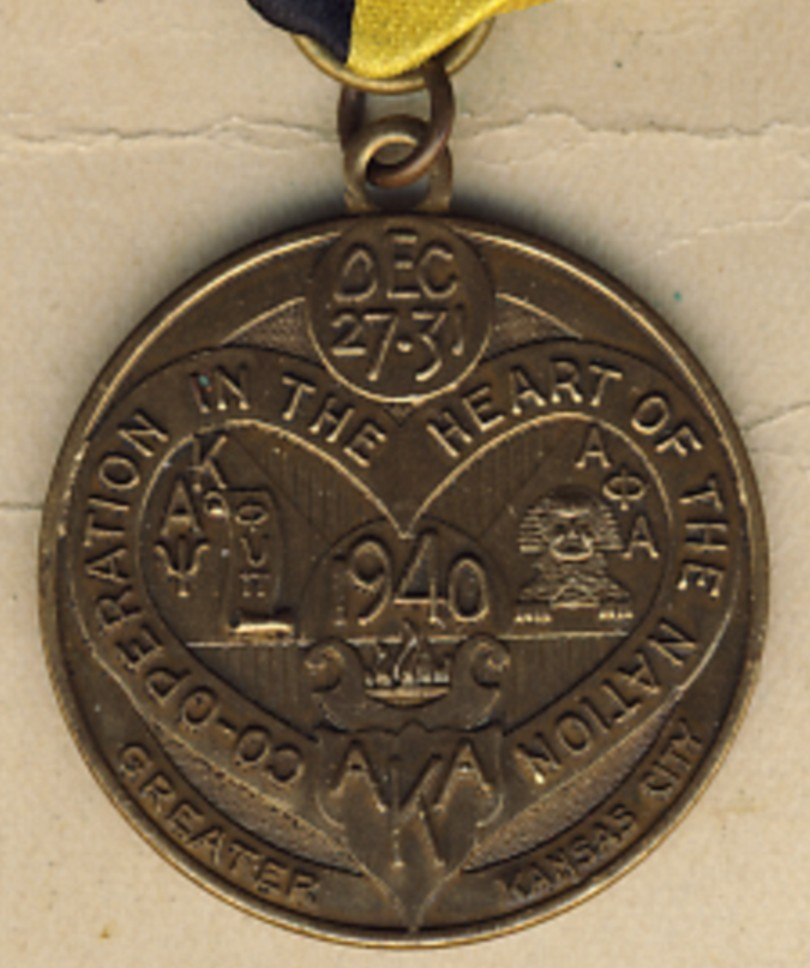
A closeup of an Alpha Phi Alpha delegate badge from the 23rd Boulé. The tri-convention—consisting of Alpha Kappa Alpha, Alpha Phi Alpha, and Kappa Alpha Psi—was held December 27–31, 1940, in Kansas City, Missouri.

=== Expansion and implementation of programs: 1913–1940 ===
Alpha Kappa Alpha helped to support members by providing scholarship funds for school and foreign studies and by raising money for Howard University's Miner Hall. The organization was the first of the historically Black fraternities and sororities at Howard University to offer a scholarship program.

A second chapter of Alpha Kappa Alpha was chartered at the University of Chicago in fall 1913. This sorority held a conference, known as Boulé, a meeting of the sorority's governing body, at Howard University in December 1918. The sorority's pledge was written by Grace Edwards and was adopted by the 1920 Boulé. In addition, the sorority's crest was designed by Phyllis Wheatley Waters and accepted in the same Boulé.

At the 1921 Boulé, the Ivy Leaf was designated as the sorority's publication, and Founders' Week, paying honor to ΆKΆ's founders, was established. The sorority membership pin was approved in the following Boulé in Kansas City, Missouri. At the 1947, Boulé, pins for honorary members were designed and approved.

By 1920, the sorority created a national service plan catered to the surrounding communities of each chapter. By May 1924, Alpha Kappa Alpha opened its vocational guidance program. Throughout the Great Migration, members assisted the Travelers Aid Society to help thousands of Southern Blacks adjust to Northern society, find housing, and navigate around the city. Members also volunteered at the Freedman's Hospital.

In 1921, the sorority sent telegrams to seven other historically Black fraternities and sororities, suggesting that they form a panhellenic. On May 10, 1930, Alpha Kappa Alpha, along with the fraternities Kappa Alpha Psi and Omega Psi Phi and sororities Delta Sigma Theta and Zeta Phi Beta, formed the National Pan-Hellenic Council (NPHC) at Howard University.

In April 1933, the sorority's international president Ida Louise Jackson visited All Saints Industrial School in Lexington, Mississippi, learning of the difficult conditions in the Mississippi Delta during the Great Depression. Some of the school's teachers did not have an education past the seventh grade. African Americans were trying to make a living sharecropping on plantation land as agricultural prices continued to fall.

In summer 1934, Jackson initiated the Summer School for Rural Teachers to train future teachers. She worked with a total of twenty-two student teachers and 243 school children. In addition, she held night classes for adults. By obtaining 2,600 books for the school's library, Jackson made it "the largest library owned by white or colored in all Holmes County."

The December 1935 Boulé approved $1,000 for Jackson to form a regional health clinic in Mississippi. The clinic opened in the summer of 1938 and evolved into the Mississippi Health Project, with Alpha Kappa Alpha Dorothy Boulding Ferebee serving as its director. The Mississippi Health Project brought primary medical care to the rural Black population across the state for six summers. It was the first mobile health clinic in the United States, assisting approximately 15,000 people in the Mississippi Delta. The project was noted for helping to decrease cases diphtheria and smallpox in the region and to improve nutritional and dental practices throughout rural Mississippi.

Norma Elizabeth Boyd led the sorority to create the National Non-Partisan Lobby on Civil and Democratic Rights (NPC) in 1938, later renamed the National Non-Partisan Council on Public Affairs. It was the first full-time congressional lobby for minority group civil rights. Throughout the organization's life, the Non-Partisan Council worked with the NAACP, National Urban League, the United Office and Professional Workers of America, the National Association of Graduate Nurses, the American Federation of Churches, the Colored Women's Club, the Brotherhood of Sleeping Car Porters and Auxiliary, and the New York Voter's League. The NPC was dissolved on July 15, 1948, by twelfth Supreme Basileus Edna Over Gray-Campbell.

In August 1945, Alpha Kappa Alpha established the American Council on Human Rights (ACHR) to replace the NPC. The council made recommendations to the government concerning civil rights legislation. The ACHR was proposed at the 1946 Boulé. In October 1946, Alpha Kappa Alpha was the first sorority to obtain observer status at the United Nations. On January 25, 1948, Delta Sigma Theta, Zeta Phi Beta, Sigma Gamma Rho sororities, and Alpha Phi Alpha and Phi Beta Sigma fraternities were charter members of the ACHR. Kappa Alpha Psi was later included in March 1949.

On September 1, 1945, Alpha Kappa Alpha established The National Health Office in New York City. The National Health Office coordinated activities with local chapters and worked with the ACHC to promote health initiatives before the United States Congress, increase the number of student nurses, and improve the state of health programs at historically black colleges and universities. The National Health Office was dissolved in 1951, as its goals were incorporated into the sorority's international program.

=== Civil rights and educational training: 1950–1970 ===
Throughout the 1950s, 1960s, and 1970s, Alpha Kappa Alpha members helped to sponsor job training, reading enrichment, heritage, and youth programs. By encouraging youth to improve math, science, and reading skills, the sorority continued a commitment to community service and enriching the lives of others. Financially, Alpha Kappa Alpha expanded funding for projects in 1953 through the creation and trademark of a fashion show called Fashionetta. Politically, ACHR continued lobbying for equality concerning civil rights during the 1950s and 1960s. According to Collier-Thomas, the ACHR drew attention to legislation concerning education, transportation, employment, and improving equality in the armed forces and public places. The ACHR participated in filing civil rights cases in amicus curiae with Bolling v. Sharpe and 1954's Brown v. Board of Education. However, ACHR voted to dissolve operations in 1963.

Alpha Kappa Alpha contributed programs for inner-city youth by capitalizing on political gains in the White House. On August 20, 1964, President Lyndon B. Johnson signed the Economic Opportunity Act, which allowed the creation of the Job Corps. The sorority wanted to operate a student job training center. Led by president Julia Purnell, the sorority negotiated with the Office of Economic Opportunity to operate a women's center from October 1964 to January 1965. Alpha Kappa Alpha was awarded a $4 million grant (equivalent to $40.9 million in 2025) to operate the Cleveland Job Corps in Cleveland, Ohio on February 12, 1965, becoming the first sorority to operate a federal job training center. Beginning in 1965, the Cleveland Job Corps trained female high school dropouts aged 16 to 21 with job and educational skills. In 1976, the Cleveland Job Corps began accepting males. The sorority operated the Cleveland Job Corps until 1995.

The sorority published The Heritage Series between 1968 and 1972. These pamphlets were a series of biographies of top African-American women, including "Women in the Judiciary", "Women in Politics", "Women in Medicine", "Women in Business", and "Women in Dentistry". Alpha Kappa Alpha also donated $20,000 for preserving Martin Luther King Jr.'s birthplace in Atlanta, Georgia, in the early 1970s. In 1978, during the sorority's seventieth anniversary, the Memorial Window at Howard University was dedicated to the founders of Alpha Kappa Alpha. Surviving founders Lavinia Norman and Norma Elizabeth Boyd attended the celebration of unveiling the Memorial Window, designed by Lois Mailou Jones.

=== Bridging toward the twenty-first century: 1980–2007 ===
Soon after the sorority's 75th anniversary, Alpha Kappa Alpha contributed funds to decrease Africa's poverty with the establishment of the African Village Development Program (AVDP). As a conjoint program with Africare, it sought to decrease poverty in African villages. In collaboration with the International Foundation for Education and Self-Help (IFESH), the sorority built ten schools in South Africa after apartheid ended, and it donated computer technology to the region.

The sorority continued to provide after-school mentoring programs, such as ON TRACK. ON TRACK, an acronym for "Organizing, Nurturing, Team building, Respecting, Achieving, Counseling and Knowing", was designed to help 20,000 at-risk third graders who were failing their education. In addition, programs such as the Ivy Reading AKAdemy and Young Authors Program improved elementary reading comprehension skills, while PIMS highlighted programs in math and science.

The purpose of Alpha Kappa Alpha Sorority is to cultivate and encourage high scholastic and ethical standards, to promote unity and friendship among college women, to study and help alleviate problems concerning girls and women to improve their social stature, to maintain a progressive interest in college life, and to be of service to all mankind.

— Sorority Creed

After Hurricane Katrina in 2005, the sorority raised money for a disaster relief fund. In July 2007, through Habitat for Humanity, the sorority helped build a house in New Orleans for a family that survived Hurricane Katrina.

Other Alpha Kappa Alpha initiatives increased awareness of health-related issues, such as AIDS, sickle cell anemia, breast cancer, and the importance of staying in shape. The sorority supported the efforts of justice for the Jena Six. It also partnered with African Ancestry, allowing members to use DNA testing to find genealogical data for themselves and their families.

=== Centennial celebration: 2008 ===
Alpha Kappa Alpha celebrated its centenary with a year-long commemoration in 2008. The celebration coincided with the sorority's biennial Boulé. Internationally, some Alpha Kappa Alpha members began marking the festivities by making a pilgrimage to Howard University from January 12 to January 15, 2008. The activities included sorority members donating $1 million in scholarship funds to Howard University, contributing libraries for Middle School for Mathematics and Science and Asbury Dwelling for Senior Citizens, and unveiling a digital version of the entire Ivy Leaf publication.

From July 11 to July 18, 2008, Alpha Kappa Alpha held their 63rd Boulé which included a town hall meeting with the public, a unity march in conjunction with other NPHC members, and a concert featuring honorary member Patti LaBelle. On July 17, 2008, Alpha Kappa Alpha Sorority set a Guinness World Record when 16,206 members participated in the largest-ever silver service sit-down dinner in a convention.

Alpha Kappa Alpha's accomplishments were heralded by the United States Congress, with U.S. Senator Hillary Clinton and sorority member U.S. Representative Sheila Jackson-Lee introducing legislation in both houses of the United States Congress to commemorate the sorority's founding. In addition, the toy company Mattel designed a Barbie collectible doll fashioned with a pink and green evening gown.

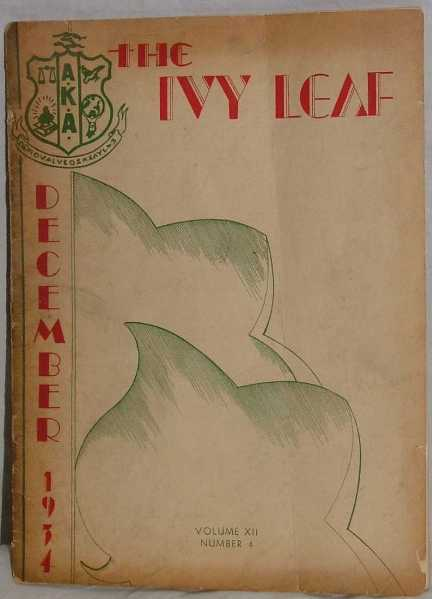
Ivy Leaf issue, 1934

== Symbols ==
The sorority's motto is "By Culture and By Merit". Its colors are salmon pink and apple green. Its symbol is the ivy leaf and its flower is the pink tea rose. Its publication is the Ivy Leaf magazine.

The term soror, derived from the Latin for "sister", is used between members of the sorority. Deceased members are referred to as "Ivies Beyond the Wall".

== Membership ==
Women may join Alpha Kappa Alpha through undergraduate chapters at a college or university, or they may be invited to join by a graduate chapter after acquiring an undergraduate or advanced college degree. Honorary membership is Alpha Kappa Alpha's highest honor.

Membership interest is processed by an interest meeting called a "rush". After the candidate receives an official letter from the sorority, she can participate in the membership intake process. Prospective members must have a C+ or a 2.5 GPA average or better before their membership submission and a record of community service. If a prospective member has graduated, she could be invited to join the sorority at the discretion of the graduate chapter.

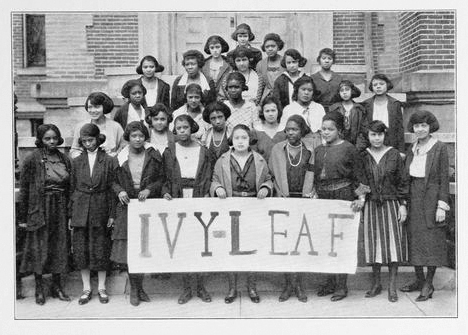
Ivy Leaf Pledge Club, Wilberforce University, 1922

=== Ivy Leaf Pledge Club ===
Historically, potential candidates for Alpha Kappa Alpha membership would join the Ivy Leaf Pledge Club before being inducted into the sorority. In Our Kind of People: Inside America's Upper Class, Lawrence Otis Graham tells of his aunt's experience in joining the Ivy Leaf Pledge Club:

We had to learn a lot more about the historic beginnings of the AKAs, and we did it by writing long letters of application to the Ivy Leaf Pledge Club—the senior wing of the sorority that regulated the admissions process—and then attending monthly meetings where the older students tutored us on the history.

According to Graham, the sorority would have "Pledge Week", a period where chapter members reviewed a candidate's grades and behavior. Candidates who withstood this period were initiated into the sorority.

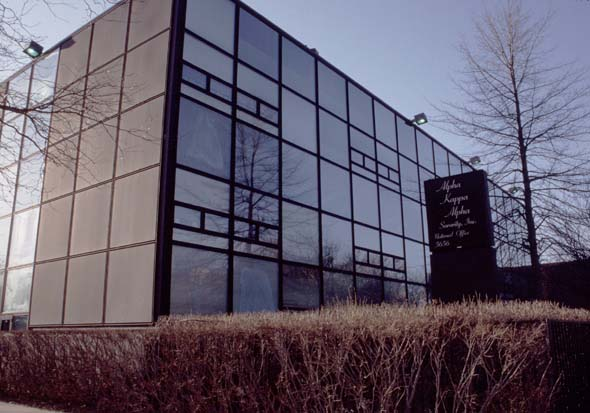
Alpha Kappa Alpha's National Headquarters in Chicago, Illinois

== Governance ==
The leadership of the sorority in the early years was derived from three separate groups—the original group, the sophomores, and the incorporators, who together are known as "The Twenty Pearls". Twelve members have held the executive director position since the office's creation on October 9, 1949.

Original group of 1908:

- Anna Easter Brown
- Beulah Elizabeth Burke
- Lillie Burke
- Marjorie Hill
- Margaret Flagg Holmes
- Ethel Hedgemon Lyle
- Lavinia Norman
- Lucy Diggs Slowe
- Marie Woolfolk Taylor

Sophomores of 1910:

- Norma Elizabeth Boyd
- Ethel Jones Mowbray
- Alice P. Murray
- Sarah Meriweather Nutter
- Joanna Berry Shields
- Carrie Snowden
- Harriet Josephine Terry

Incorporators of 1913:

- Nellie Quander
- Julia Evangeline Brooks
- Norma Elizabeth Boyd
- Ethel Jones Mowbray
- Nellie Pratt Russell
- Minnie B. Smith

=== International Presidents ===
Listed below are the thirty International Presidents since the 1913 institution of the office. "Supreme" is added to the title of an international officeholder, such as Supreme Basileus.

- Nellie Quander (1913)
- Lorraine Richardson Green (1919)
- Lottie Pearl Mitchell (1923)
- Pauline S. Puryear (1925)
- B. Beatrix Scott (1927)
- Maudelle Brown Bousfield (1929)
- Maude B. Porter (1931)
- Ida L. Jackson (1933)
- Margaret D. Bowen (1936)
- Dorothy B. Ferebee (1939)
- Beulah T. Whitby (1941)
- Edna O. Campbell (1946)
- Laura Lovelace (1949)
- Arnetta G. Wallace (1953)
- Marjorie H. Parker (1958)
- Julia B. Purnell (1962)
- Larzette Hale (1966)
- Mattelia B. Grays (1970)
- Bernice I. Sumlin (1974)
- Barbara K. Phillips (1978)
- Faye B. Bryant (1982)
- Janet Jones Ballard (1986)
- Mary Shy Scott (1990)
- Eva L. Evans (1994)
- Norma S. White (1998)
- Linda White (2002)
- Barbara A. McKinzie (2006)
- Carolyn House Stewart (2010)
- Dorothy Buckhanan Wilson (2014)
- Glenda Glover (2018)
- Danette Anthony Reed (2022)
- Charletta Wilson Jacks (2026 – Present)

=== Boulé ===
The Boulé (Note: The word boulé, derived from ancient Greek βουλή and originally referring to a council of nobles advising a king, is also used by the African-American professional organization Sigma Pi Phi.) is the regulating institution of the sorority and meets every two years. The first Boulé was held at Howard University in December 1918. Meetings were held annually in December. No Boulé occurred in 1942 due to World War II. The 41st Boulé in 1964 was the last annual meeting scheduled around the Christmas holiday. After the 41st Boulé, Boulé meetings were held every two years. The 69th Annual Boule scheduled for July 15–19, 2020, in Philadelphia, was canceled because of concerns about COVID-19.

Notable speakers at Boulé conventions include civil rights activists Martin Luther King Jr. and Roy Wilkins.

== Chapters ==
The nine regions of Alpha Kappa Alpha Sorority in the United States

After establishing 32 graduate and undergraduate chapters in 1924, Alpha Kappa Alpha Sorority organized chapters according to their regions in the United States and abroad. The Boulé determines the boundaries of the regions. The ten regions are each led by a regional director, who serves a member of the sorority's board of directors. As of 2025, Alpha Kappa Alpha has 1,085 chapters in the United States and eleven other countries. For graduate chapters, "Omega" is added to distinguish those that consist of college graduates from undergraduate chapters.

== Philanthropy ==
=== Ivy Acres ===
Senior Residences, Incorporated, a subsidiary of Alpha Kappa Alpha, is currently developing Ivy Acres, a retirement center in Winston-Salem, North Carolina. Ivy Acres will be one of the first retirement centers founded by African Americans and minorities in the United States. According to Business Wire, Ivy Acres will include 188 independent, 40 assisted-living apartments, 20 units for skilled nursing care." Residents are expected to pay $1,890 to $2,890 monthly for services. The planning for Ivy Acres cost approximately US$32 million.

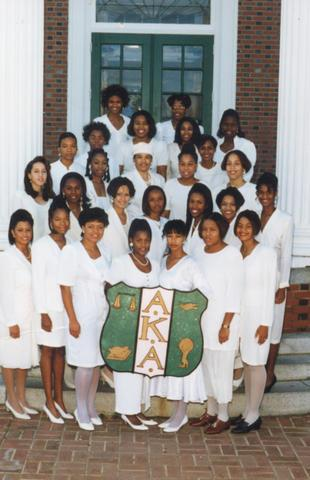
Alpha Kappa Alpha's Alpha Epsilon chapter at Virginia State University in 1994

=== Ivy Reading AKAdemy ===
The sorority's Ivy Reading AKAdemy is a reading initiative that focuses on early learning and mastery of basic reading skills by the end of third grade.

=== Leadership Fellows Program ===
The Leadership Fellows Program trains thirty Alpha Kappa Alpha Sorority sophomore and junior undergraduate members for professional leadership roles. In addition, the fellows contribute to community service for one week. In the past, Alpha Kappa Alpha has sponsored the event through the Educational Advancement Foundation. Also, the program has been financed by Pillsbury, Tyson Foods, Johnson & Johnson, and most recently General Electric.

=== Partnerships in Mathematics and Science ===
The sorority started Partnerships in Mathematics and Science (PIMS) in 1994 to encourage Black girls to pursue math, science, and technology careers. The National Science Foundation and historically black colleges nationwide sponsored campaigns to highlight the program's importance. Several chapters provided two-week math and science summer camps on college and day school campuses.

=== Young Authors Program ===
The Young Authors Program aims to encourage and raise reading and writing involvement in kindergarten through third-grade children. Each of the ten regions in the sorority selected a child's story to be published in a two-volume anthology entitled The Spirit Within: Voices of Young Authors.

== Foundation ==
Alpha Kappa Alpha's Educational Advancement Foundation (EAF) is a separate and tax-exempt branch of the sorority, which "provide[s] financial support to individuals and organizations engaged in lifelong learning." The foundation awards academic scholarships (for undergraduate members of the sorority, as well as non-members), fellowships, and grants for community service.

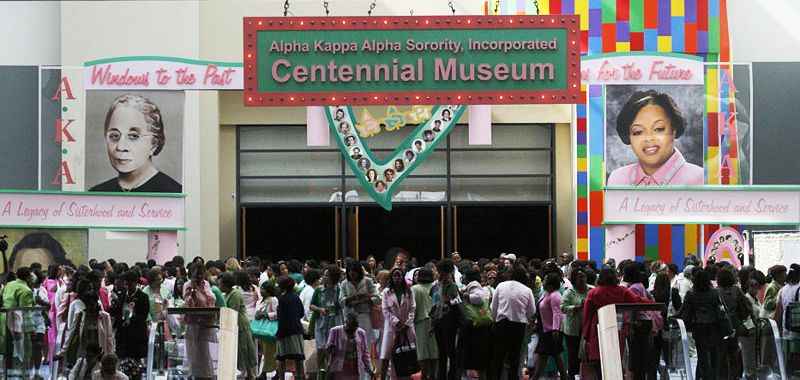
Centennial museum at the Walter E. Washington Convention Center

The foundation was founded in 1978 by Constance Holland, the sister of former Alpha Kappa Alpha International president Barbara Phillips. It officially began in 1980, and the sorority donated US$10,000 for the project. Eight years later, the organization awarded $10,000 to fourteen students. In 1991, EAF awarded mini-grants to community organizations. In 1998, EAF provided the first Youth Partners Accessing Capital (PAC) award to an undergraduate member.

At the organization's twentieth anniversary in 2000, EAF published Perpetuating Our Posterity: A Blueprint for Excellence. The book served as a comprehensive history of the organization and a source of advice for other beginning philanthropies.

For the sorority's centennial, the foundation created the Alpha Kappa Alpha Exhibit to travel to several U.S. cities from 2006 to 2008. The foundation also celebrated the centennial by donating $2 million to Howard University. Half of the gift supported the Moorland-Spingarn Research Center, which houses the historical artifacts, photographs, documents, and recordings of Alpha Kappa Alpha. The other half of the gift went to the Nellie M. Quander Scholarship Fund for partial or full scholarships junior and senior female students at Howard.

== Notable members ==
As of 2025, Alpha Kappa Alpha has initiated more than 365,000 women and has 90,000 active members. Graduate members constitute the largest percentage of membership. Former Vice President Kamala Harris is one of the sorority's most notable members, having joined during her time at Howard University.

== Member and chapter misconduct ==
=== Embezzlement ===
On June 20, 2009, eight Alpha Kappa Alpha Sorority members filed a complaint in the Superior Court for the District of Columbia demanding that international president Barbara McKinzie be fired for improper use of sorority funds and the money be returned to the sorority. The lawsuit claimed that the sorority's executive board approved the spending of substantial amounts on McKinzie's costs of living, including the commissioning an expensive wax model of McKinzie that cost $900,000. McKinzie denied the allegations, describing them as "without merit". The sorority revoked the memberships of the eight members who filed the complaint in retaliation for the lawsuit, but a judge later required reinstatement. In February 2010, the Superior Court dismissed the lawsuit. On August 18, 2011, the District of Columbia Court of Appeals reversed that decision.

On March 22, 2012, a forensic audit of Alpha Kappa Alpha's 2010 financial records revealed concerns with past president McKinzie's development and access to a "secret" bank account. The findings of the audit supported the claims in the previous lawsuit. The audit also found that two former officials continued using sorority credit cards after their service ended, failing to document charges appropriately. Another lawsuit against the organization, McKinzie, and other officials contained similar allegations. The audit found that McKinzie and the other officials secretly created a second set of financial books to get around the sorority's accounting policies. According to the audit, "(n)early $1.7 million in payments were made to the former president, Barbara McKinzie, without authorization. Approximately $282,000 in credit card charges on a second set of books appear to be fraudulent, including personal charges the sorority wasn't reimbursed for." The sorority later expelled McKinzie and won an arbitration award of $1.6 million against her. McKinzie challenged the award, but the appeals court affirmed the award in favor of the sorority.

=== Hazing ===
On September 9, 2002, Kristin High (age 22) and Kenitha Saafir (age 24) from California State University, Los Angeles died following a hazing activity. Members of Alpha Kappa Alpha instructed the women to perform a series of activities blindfolded on Dockweiler State Beach when a high tide came, and eventually drowned both of them. The next day, when the woman brought Kristin's car and cell phone to her mother, she noticed her pledge journal missing from the car and numbers deleted from her cell phone. Before Kristin's death, Kristin's mother encouraged her to fully disassociate herself from the sorority after Kristin discussed inappropriate behavior by members of the sorority. A year after the incident, the families of the deceased settled with Alpha Kappa Alpha Sorority Inc. after filing a $100 million civil wrongful death lawsuit. The sorority denied having an active chapter at CSULA, but the court rejected that assertion and found the sorority accountable for the deaths. No criminal charges were filed. The CSULA chapter had previously been sanctioned for hazing, and the sorority permanently expelled all members involved with the death.

In 2018, the University of Pittsburgh suspended the Iota chapter because of hazing—a mother reported bruises on her daughter's arm. The daughter, along with eleven other students, admitted to having been involved in hazing practices at the sorority.

In a 2019 lawsuit filed in the U.S. District Court of Illinois, the family of Jordan Hankins blamed Alpha Kappa Alpha, Inc. for her 2017 suicide. Hankins, a sophomore basketball player at Northwestern University, pledged to the sorority after receiving official membership. While backward pledging to gain respect from chapter members who went through a similar process, Hankins "was subjected to physical abuse including paddling, verbal abuse, mental abuse, financial exploitation, sleep deprivation, items being thrown and dumped on her, and other forms of hazing intended to humiliate and demean her," according to the lawsuit. An official statement from Alpha Kappa Alpha, Inc. says the sorority is "deeply saddened" by Hankins' death and declined to comment on the details of the complaint and her suicide due to the "sensitive nature" of the incident and "the ongoing grief her family is experiencing".

=== Fort Valley Scandal ===
In May 2018, the Alpha Beta chapter at Fort Valley State University (FVSU) was placed under investigation by the University System of Georgia and the Georgia Bureau of Investigations due to allegations that the executive assistant to FVSU's president and graduate advisor of the chapter, Alecia Johnson, suggested low-income prospective members have sex with affluent men in Georgia to cover approximately $1,500 in required membership intake fees. Johnson resigned from her position at the university and hired legal representation to contest the allegations. In June 2019, Johnson pled guilty to prostituting herself and one FVSU student. Also, as part of her plea deal, she testified against the men charged in the prostitution ring. Her plea deal resulted in her getting five years of probation, 180 days of house arrest, and a $1,000 fine. No undergraduate chapter members were indicted in the GBI investigation. The sorority completed an internal investigation into the matter, and allowed the chapter to remain in good standing with the sorority's highest leadership.

== See also ==
- List of social sororities and women's fraternities
- College fraternities and sororities
