= Ethel Hedgeman Lyle =

American sorority founder (1887–1950)

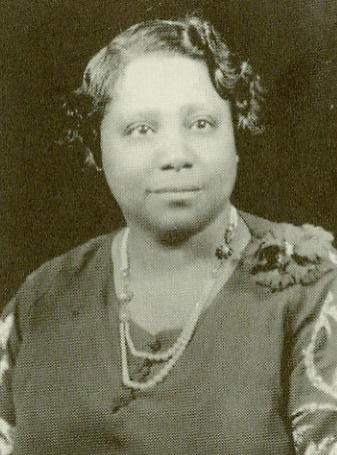
- Ethel Hedgeman Lyle, original founder of Alpha Kappa Alpha
- Born: February 10, 1887; St. Louis, Missouri, U.S.
- Died: November 28, 1950 (aged 63); Philadelphia, Pennsylvania, U.S.
- Education: Howard University (BA)

Ethel Hedgeman Lyle (born Ethel Hedgeman, sometimes spelled Hedgemon; February 10, 1887 – November 28, 1950) was a founder of the Alpha Kappa Alpha sorority (ΑΚΑ) at Howard University in 1908. It was the first sorority founded by African-American college women. Lyle is often referred to as the "Guiding Light" for the organization.

Lyle had a forty-year career as an educator and was active in public life. She was National Treasurer of the sorority for more than twenty years. Ethel Hedgeman Lyle was the first president of AKA's first alumnae chapter in Philadelphia, Pennsylvania. Lyle also founded the West Philadelphia chapter of the League of Women Voters and the Mothers Club in the city. In 2000, the Ethel Hedgeman Lyle Academy, a charter school in St. Louis, Missouri, was founded in her honor.

All these activities helped create social capital in the city in a time of rapid growth and population changes. Lyle demonstrated in her committed life how African-American sororities supported women "to create spheres of influence, authority and power within institutions that traditionally have allowed African Americans and women little formal authority and real power".

== Early life ==
Ethel Hedgeman was born in 1887 in St. Louis, Missouri. Throughout her educational career, Hedgeman attended public schools in St. Louis. In 1904, Hedgeman graduated from Sumner High School with honors. She was the first student from Sumner to receive a scholarship to Howard University, a highly ranked historically black college. Hedgeman went to Howard at a time when only one in three hundred African Americans and 5% of whites of eligible age attended any college.

In 1904, Hedgeman enrolled at Howard University. However, due to illness in her sophomore year, Hedgeman had to take a break from her studies. Throughout college, she participated in Howard's choir, the YWCA, the Christian Endeavor, and drama plays. She was described as lively and charming, despite her delicate health.

== Career ==
=== Alpha Kappa Alpha ===
Hedgeman was instrumental in founding Alpha Kappa Alpha, America's first Greek-letter organization established by Black college women. She was inspired by the accounts of Miss Ethel Tremaine Robinson, a faculty member at Howard who shared her sorority experiences at Brown University. To establish the sorority, Hedgeman began recruiting interested classmates in the beginning of 1907. Hedgeman and eight other classmates founded Alpha Kappa Alpha on January 15, 1908. Hedgeman served as vice-president of the sorority, and designed the insignia for the sorority.

=== Education ===
After graduating in 1909 with a Bachelor of Arts in liberal arts, Hedgeman moved to Eufaula, Oklahoma for her first job as a teacher. She taught music in Sumner Normal School between 1909 and 1910. She was the first African-American female college graduate to teach in a normal school in Oklahoma and the first to earn a Teacher's Life Certificate from the Oklahoma State Department of Education. In 1910, Hedgeman moved to Centralia, Illinois, where she also taught in public schools.

On June 21, 1911, Ethel Hedgeman married George Lyle, whom she had dated in high school and college. They moved to Philadelphia, Pennsylvania, where Ethel gave birth to George, III, her only child. George Lyle also worked as a teacher, considered by both to be a critical profession for the future of African Americans.

Ethel continued her education career in Philadelphia by teaching English at the Thomas Purham School and Chester A. Arthur School. She retired in 1948, after almost forty years of teaching generations of students.

In addition to her work as an educator, Lyle was active in public life. She helped found civic institutions such as the West Philadelphia League of Women Voters and the Mother's Club of the city. In addition Lyle was a member of the Republican Women's Committee of Ward 40 and active in her church.

As national treasurer of Alpha Kappa Alpha from 1923 to 1946, Lyle helped lead the sorority through years of rapid social change, including the Great Migration of more than a million African Americans from the South to the North, the Depression and challenges of World War II. In Philadelphia 1926 she chartered and was the first president of Omega Omega, the first alumnae chapter of Alpha Kappa Alpha in Philadelphia. (Eighty years old and with 400 members in the 21st century, the Omega Omega chapter continues to provide services to women and children in the city.)

Lyle's leadership skills were called on in 1937, when the Mayor of Philadelphia appointed her to chair the Committee of 100 Women, organized to plan the Sesquicentennial Anniversary of the Adoption of the U.S. Constitution.

== Death ==
On November 28, 1950, aged 63, Lyle died in Philadelphia, Pennsylvania.

== Honors ==
The spirit of AKA hovering over us and our little deeds and acts—smoothing here, covering there, broadening younger, and making us do our best to think, to act, up to the highest in us. It is a force bigger than we are, stronger than we are, and it compels us to climb to the heights where it dwells.

— Ethel Hedgeman Lyle,

Lyle received many accolades for her achievements. In honor of her role as founder of AKA, in 1926 Alpha Kappa Alpha designated her Honorary Basileus, the only member with that title. In 1951, the sorority established the Ethel Hedgeman Lyle Endowment Fund. In 1994 Lyle's granddaughters, Andrea Lyle-Wilson and Muriel Lyle-Smith, were inducted as honorary members of Alpha Kappa Alpha.

In 2018, Lyle's great-great-granddaughter, and Lyle-Smith's granddaughter, Chantél Harris, was inducted as an honorary member of Alpha Kappa Alpha. In 2020, Lyle's great-great-granddaughter, and Lyle-Wilson's granddaughter, Scierra Hall, was initiated as a member of Alpha chapter of Alpha Kappa Alpha at Howard University.

In Lyle's birthplace of St. Louis, members of Omicron Theta Omega chapter of Alpha Kappa Alpha, set up a charter school, named Ethel Hedgeman Lyle Academy in her honor. It has expanded since 2000 to cover grades K-10 (as of 2005), serving several hundred children.
