= List of Kappa Alpha Psi members =

The list of Kappa Alpha Psi (ΚΑΨ) brothers (commonly referred to as Kappas or Nupes) includes initiated members. The list below includes members recognized as leaders in their respective fields.

As of its centennial in 2025, the fraternity is composed of over 260,000 college-trained men, with undergraduate chapters located on more than 360 college and university campuses and alumni chapters in more than 340 cities in the United States and five foreign countries. The fraternity's constitution has never contained any clause which either excluded or suggested the exclusion of a man from membership merely because of his color, creed, or national origin, though membership has traditionally been dominated by those of African heritage.

Kappa Alpha Psi was founded on January 5, 1911, at Indiana University Bloomington in Bloomington, Indiana. The campus of Indiana University at that time did not encourage the assimilation of Blacks. Kappa Alpha Psi is the second oldest existing collegiate historically Black Greek letter organization and the first intercollegiate fraternity incorporated as a national body.

== Academia ==
Name	Original chapter	Notability	Ref.
Elbert Frank Cox	Alpha	First African American to earn a Ph.D. in pure mathematics, a field concerned with mathematical theory rather than with practice or application	
Juan E. Gilbert	Kappa Delta	Distinguished Professor and Andrew Banks Family Preeminence Endowed Chair at the University of Florida; recipient of the Presidential Award for Excellence in Science, Mathematics, and Engineering Mentoring; laureate of the National Medal of Technology and Innovation	
Marc Lamont Hill	Abington-Ambler (PA) Alumni	Professor at Temple University; author; activist; TV political commentator and host of Our World with Black Enterprise	
Philip G. Hubbard	Gamma	A university professor and administrator who was the first African-American faculty member at the University of Iowa, the first African-American administrator at any of Iowa's state universities, and the first African-American vice president at a Big 10 university.	
Joseph B. Johnson	Gamma Psi	Ph.D; former president of Grambling State University (1977 - 1991); former president of Talladega College (1991 - 1998).	
Harry G. Robinson III	Xi	professor of architecture and Dean Emeritus of the School of Architecture and Design at Howard University in Washington, D.C.	
Arturo Alfonso Schomburg	Omicron	Historian and scholar of African-American culture	
Marvin Scott	Alpha Epsilon	An American politician and university professor at Butler University.	
Gregory H. Williams	Cincinnati (OH) Alumni	American scholar, attorney, law school professor, author, and formerly the 27th President of the University of Cincinnati (2009 to 2012) and the 11th President of the City College of New York (2001–2009).	
John Silvanus Wilson	Pi	President of Morehouse College, former executive director, White House Initiative on HBCUs	

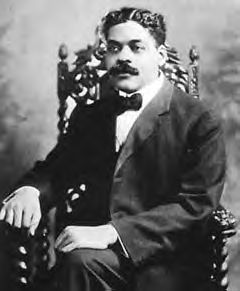
Arturo Schomburg

== Arts and entertainment ==
=== Film, television and theatre ===
Name	Original chapter	Notability	Ref.
Joe Clair	Alpha Iota	Television host, best known for hosting BET's Rap City	
Aaron Douglas	Eta	American painter, illustrator and visual arts educator. He was a major figure in the Harlem Renaissance.	
Lance Gross	San Fernando-Santa Clarita (CA) Alumni	Stage and television actor; best known for his role as Calvin Payne on Tyler Perry's House of Payne	
Belford Hendricks	Alpha Zeta	American composer, pianist, arranger, conductor, and record producer	
Cedric 'The Entertainer' Kyles	Beta Nu (Charter Member: Mu Zeta)	Comedian and actor	
Max Julien	Xi	Maxwell Banks, better known by his stage name Max Julien, was an American actor, sculptor, and clothes designer best known for his role as Goldie in the 1973 blaxploitation film The Mack.[1]	
Stan Lathan	Delta Theta	Film director, television producer, and television director and producer of shows such as Sanford & Son and Russell Simmons' Def Comedy Jam	
Whitman Mayo	Upsilon	Actor, best known as the character Grady Wilson on the sitcom Sanford and Son	
Robert Reed	Alpha Iota	Artist and tenured art professor at Yale University School of Art	
John Singleton	Beta Omega	Director, best known for Boyz n the Hood and Rosewood (film)	
Aaron D. Spears	Mu Phi	Television actor	
Ernest Lee Thomas	Alpha Zeta	Actor, best known as Roger "Raj" Thomas of What's Happening!! and What's Happening Now!!	
Palmer Williams Jr.	Beta Phi	Stage and television actor; best known for his role as Floyd Jackson on Tyler Perry's House of Payne and the sitcom Love Thy Neighbor	

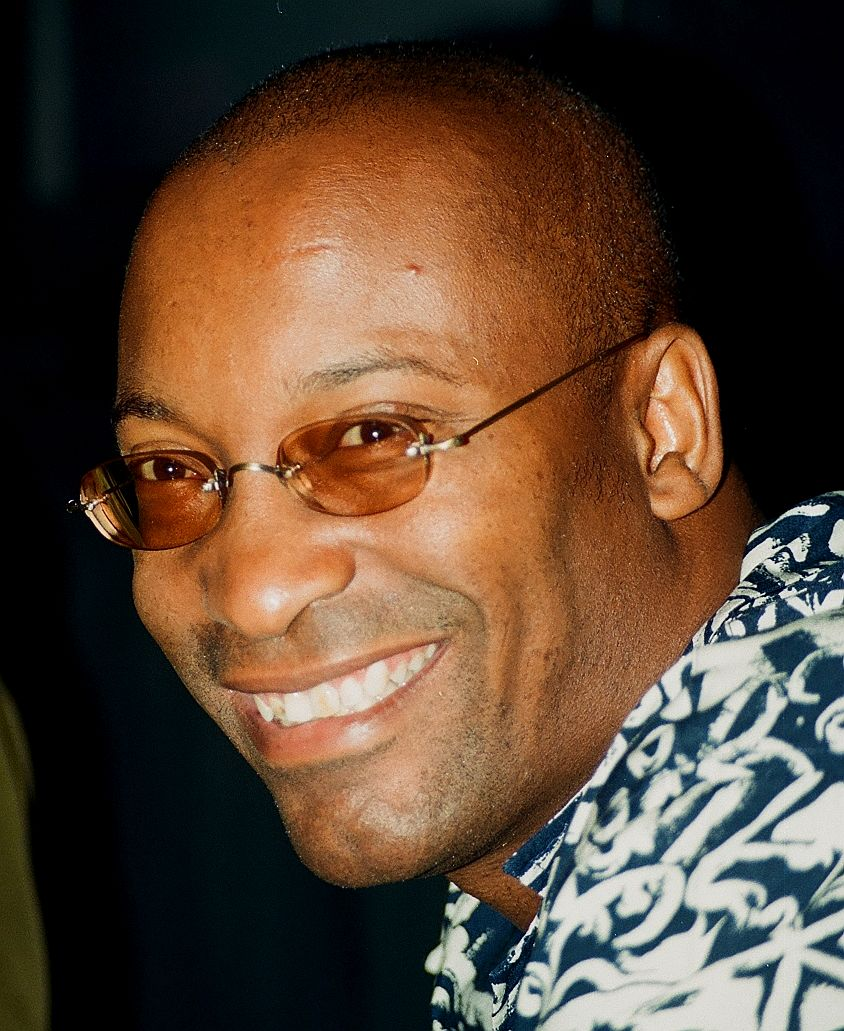
John Singleton

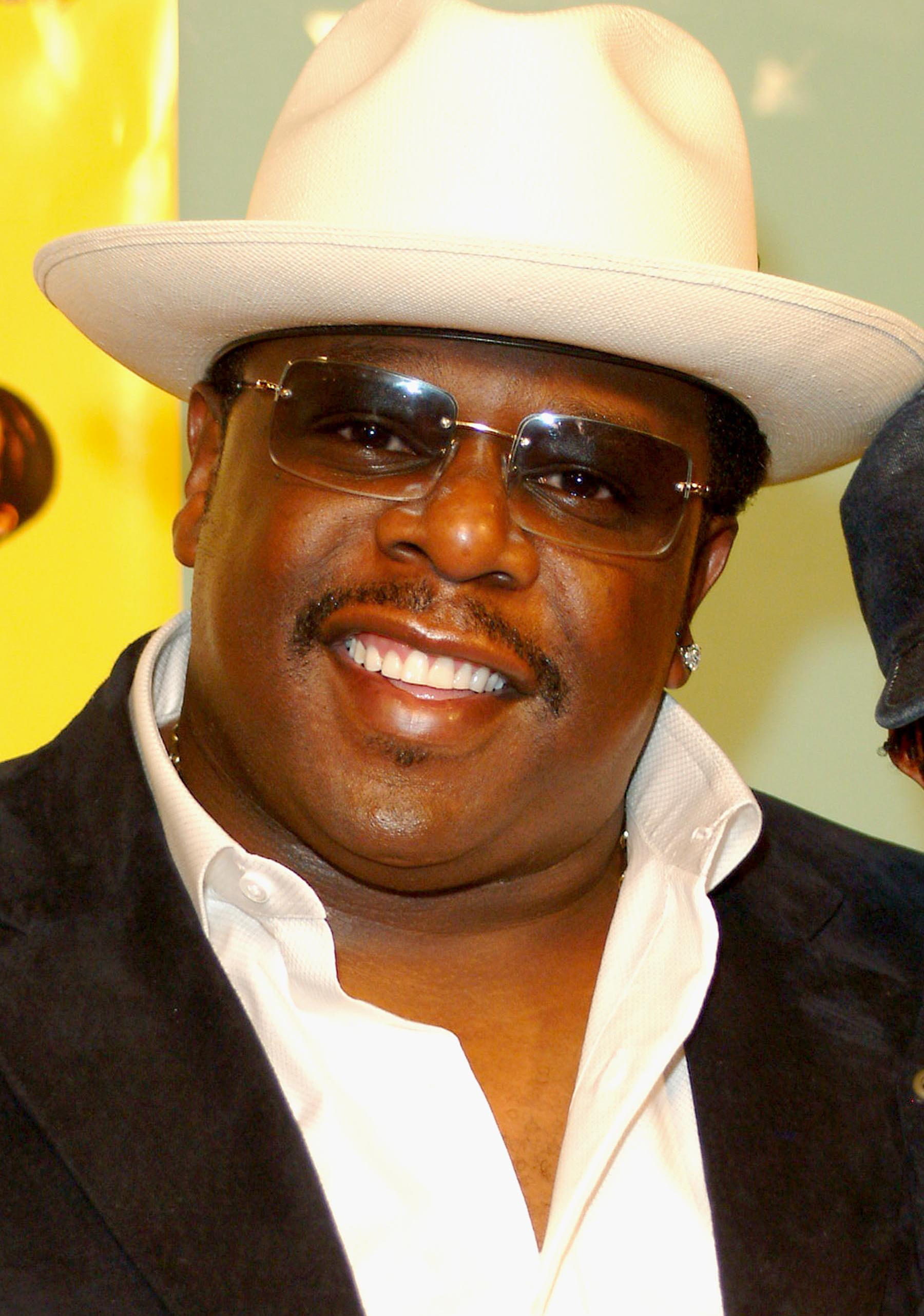
Cedric The Entertainer

=== Print, television, and online media ===
Name	Original chapter	Notability	Ref.
Charles M. Blow	Gamma Psi	American journalist; current visual op-ed columnist for The New York Times; former graphics director and art director for National Geographic magazine.	
Chris Broussard	Iota Nu	Sports columnist and sports reporter for Fox Sports 1	
Kevin Corke	Beta Theta	Fox News White House Correspondent	
Gus Johnson	Silver Spring (MD) Alumni	Fox Sports commentator	
Demarco Morgan	Delta Delta	Current co-host of ABC's GMA3; former CBS News anchor; former News reporter and anchor for Atlanta's NBC affiliate, WXIA.	
Kevin Samuels	Zeta Omega	American internet personality and image consultant	
Tavis Smiley	Alpha	Talk show host; political commentator; author	
Jim Vance	Gamma Omega	News anchor for the NBC affiliate WRC-TV in Washington, D.C.	
Roger Wilkins	Sigma	Journalist, professor, and civil rights leader;	

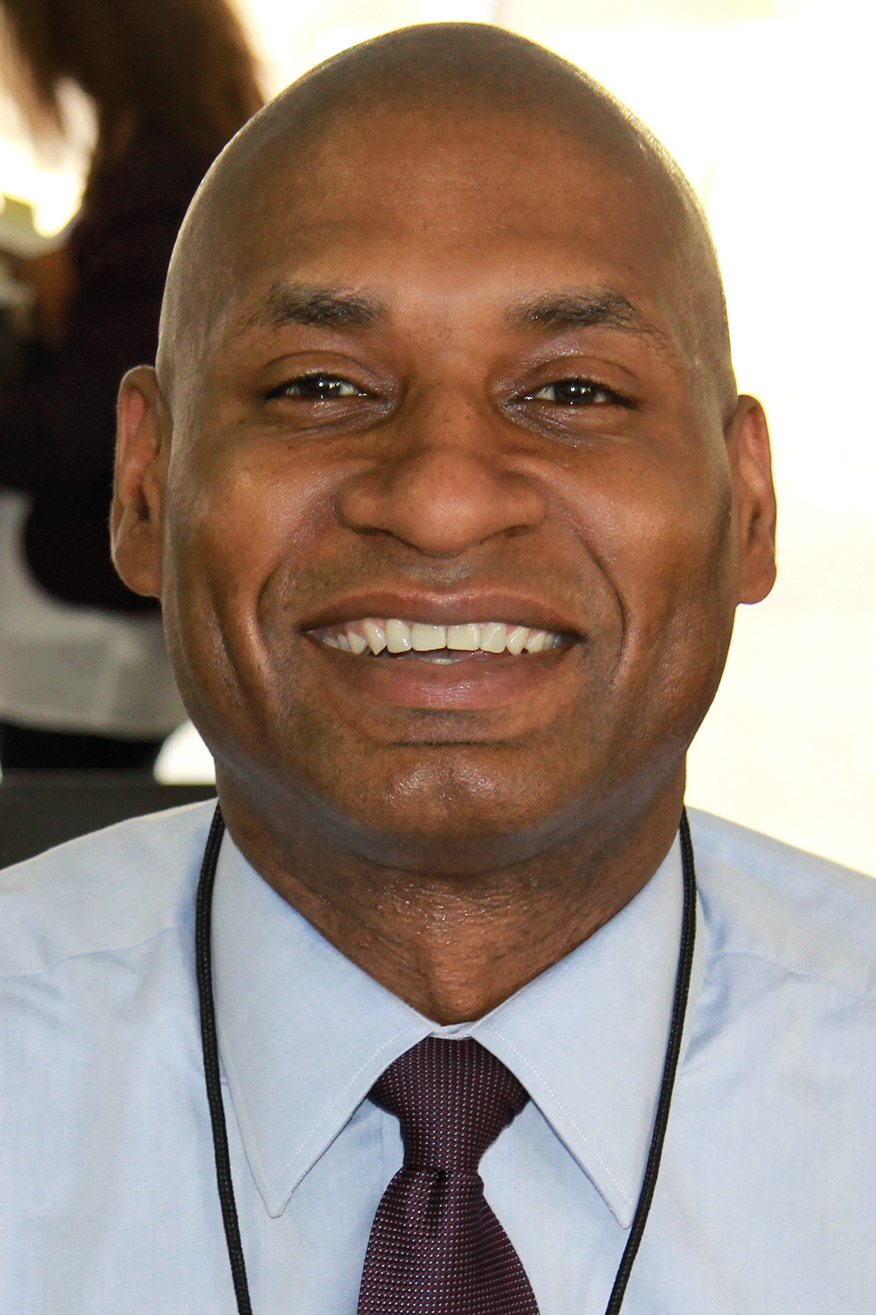
Charles M. Blow

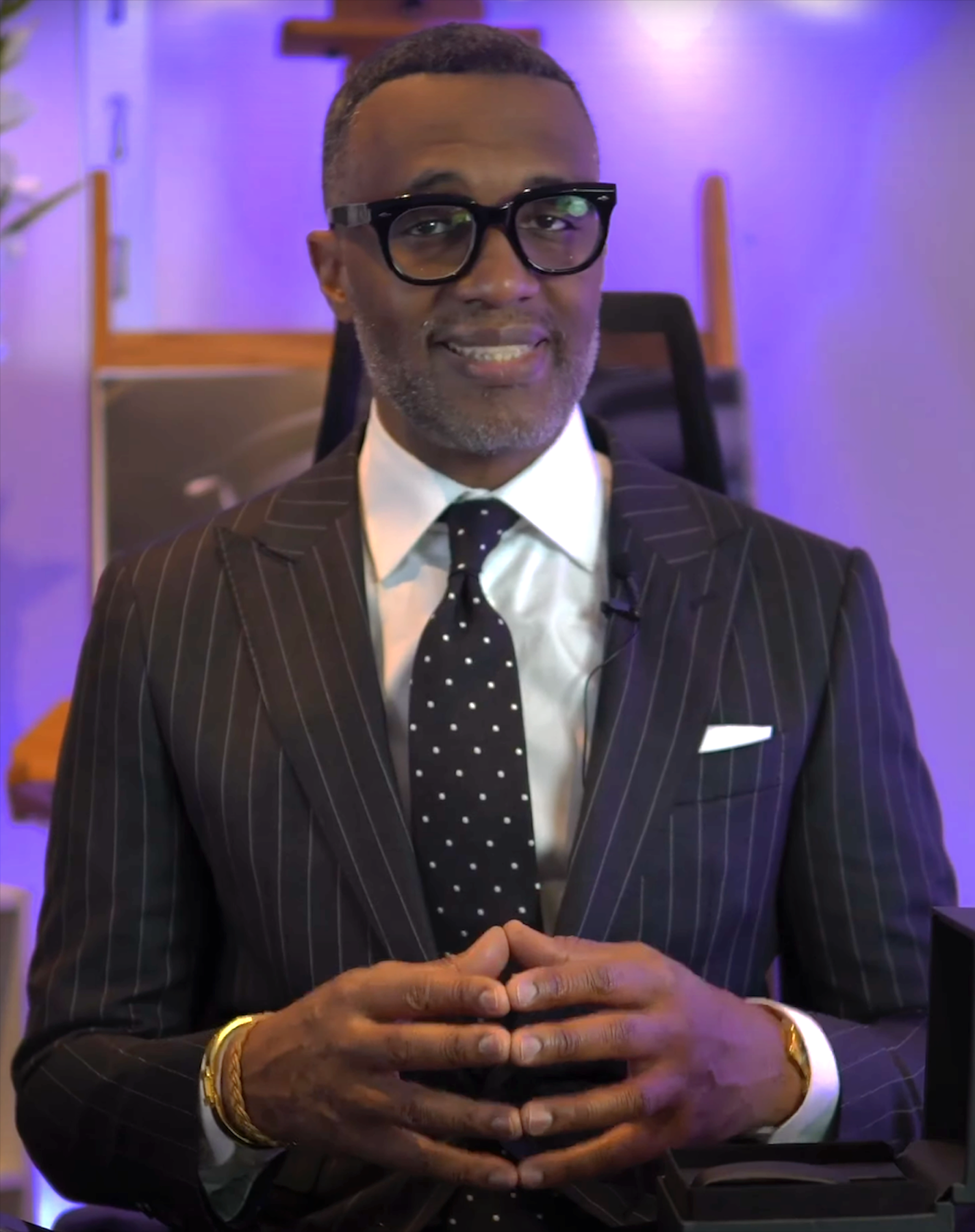
Kevin Samuels

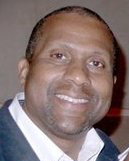
Tavis Smiley

=== Music ===
Name	Original chapter	Notability	Ref.
Alvin Batiste	Alpha Sigma	Jazz clarinetist	
Marion Brown	Gamma Kappa	American jazz alto saxophonist, composer, writer, visual artist, and ethnomusicologist. He is best known as a member of the 1960s avant-garde jazz scene in New York City, playing alongside musicians such as John Coltrane, Archie Shepp, and John Tchicai.	
Lawrence Brownlee	Indianapolis (IN) Alumni	Opera singer	
Elwood Buchanan	Beta	Jazz trumpeter; music educator; early mentor to jazz legend Miles Davis	
Donald Byrd	Alpha Beta	Jazz and R&B trumpeter	
Byron Cage	Kappa Upsilon	Gospel musician	
Danny!	Gamma Nu	Recording artist for Questlove's Okayplayer Records; music producer/ and composer for MTV's Hype Music production library	
DeP	Beta Beta	R&B Recording Artist, Actor, and Model	
Cleveland Eaton	Alpha Theta	Jazz bassist with Count Basie Orchestra and the Ramsey Lewis Trio	
Jester Hairston	Chi	American composer, songwriter, arranger, and choral conductor; actor on sitcom Amen	
Graham W. Jackson Sr.	Pi	Organist, Composer, Music Educator, Pianist, and choral conductor	
Kidd Jordan	Alpha Sigma	Jazz saxophonist	
Montell Jordan	Beta Omega	R&B musician	
Booker T. Jones	Alpha	American multi-instrumentalist, songwriter, record producer, and arranger, best known as the frontman of the band Booker T. & the M.G.'s.	
Lecrae	Eta Gamma	Christian hip hop artist, record producer, and actor; president, co-owner, and co-founder of the independent record label Reach Records	
Smokie Norful	Gamma Sigma	Gospel musician	
Kosine	Kappa Phi	Producer, composer, music educator, and performer	
Marvin Sapp	Grand Rapids (MI) Alumni	Gospel musician	
William Grant Still	Delta	Classical composer, first African American to conduct a major American symphony orchestra	
Billy Taylor	Alpha Phi	Jazz musician	
Kris Thomas	Eta Gamma	R&B and soul singer; competed in Season 4 of The Voice	

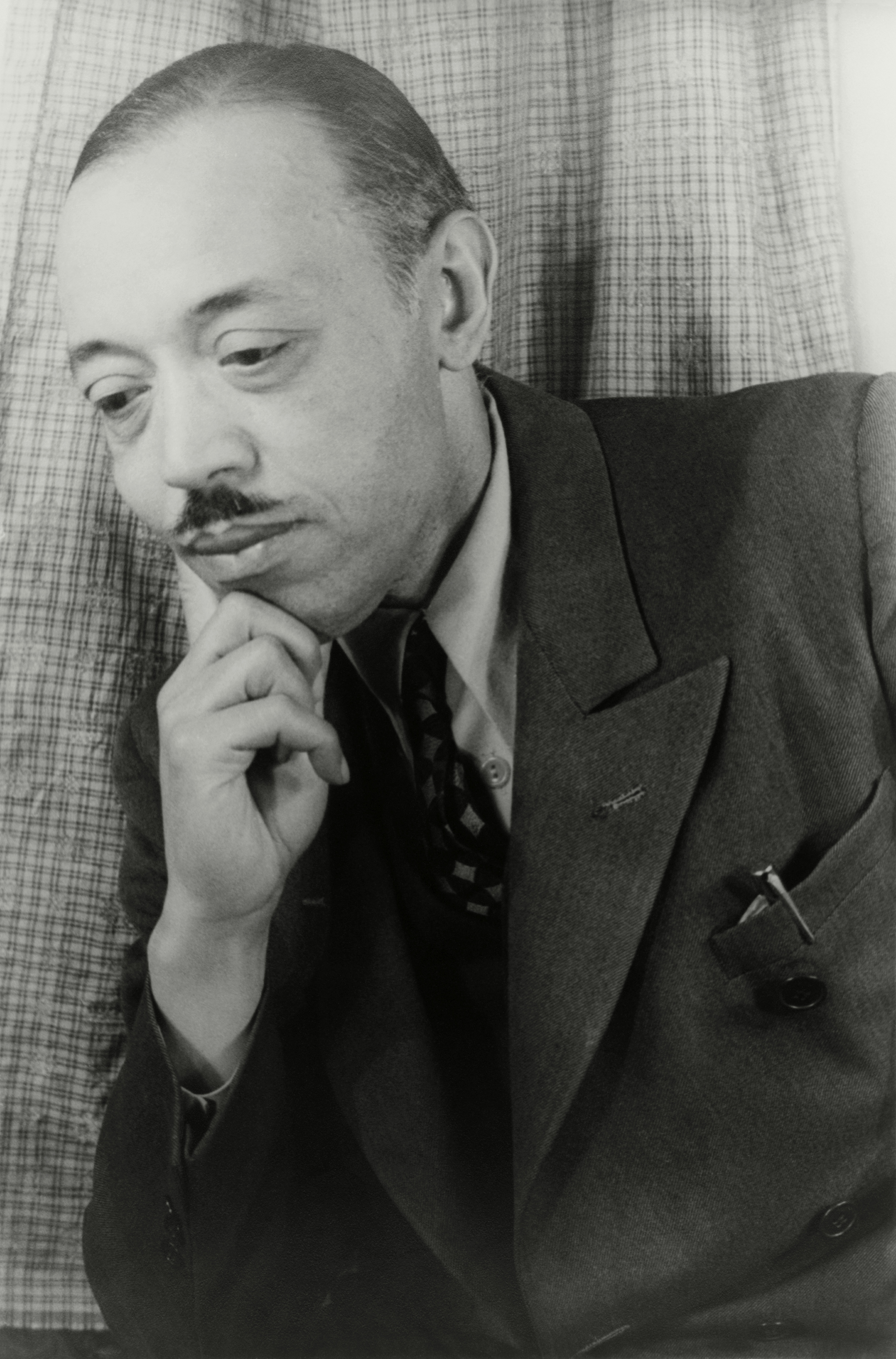
Grant Still

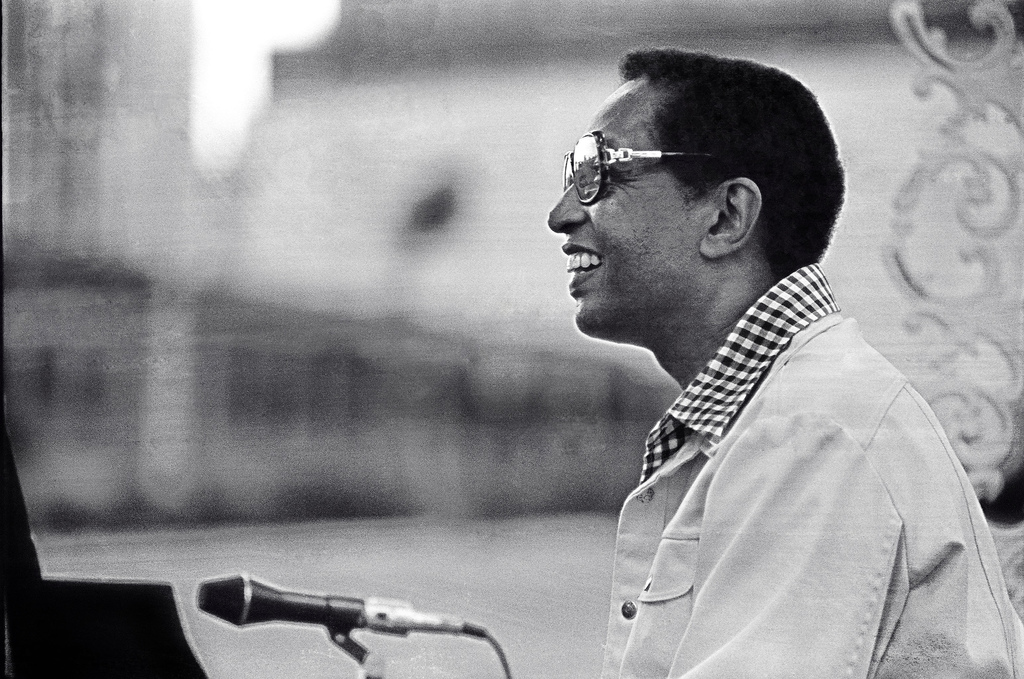
Billy Taylor

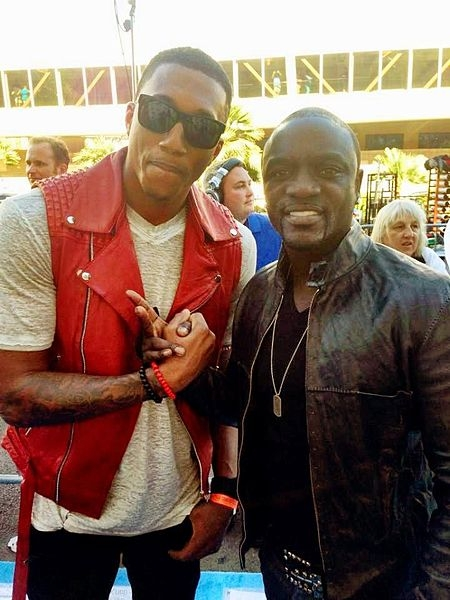
Lecrae (left)

== Business ==
Name	Original chapter	Notability	Ref.
Rod Adkins	Gamma Kappa (Charter member: Lambda Delta)	Vice President of Anheuser-Busch; Electrical engineer, philanthropist, and American business executive. 73rd Laurel Wreath Laureate;	
James A. Dallas	Miami (FL) Alumni	Businessman, nightclub owner, and civic leader, Fort Lauderdale;	
Monte E. Ford	Chi	Technology executive; CIO of American Airlines (2001–2012); CEO of Aptean; board member of Akamai Technologies, Iron Mountain, JetBlue Airways, and Centene Corporation	
John Edward Jacob	Xi	Vice President of Anheuser-Busch; former CEO of the National Urban League 60th Laurel Wreath Laureate;	
Robert L. Johnson	Beta	American businessman, media magnate, executive, philanthropist and investor; founder of Black Entertainment Television (BET); former majority owner of the Charlotte Bobcats; first African-American billionaire; first African-American majority club owner of a major American sports league	
Reginald Lewis	Alpha Phi	CEO of TLC Beatrice International, the first black-owned company to have more than $1 billion in annual sales	
Jerry Lorenzo	San Fernando-Santa Clarita (CA) Alumni	American businessman and fashion designer; Founder of Fear of God	
Kedar Massenburg	Delta Mu	President and CEO of Motown Records	
John Moutoussamy	Alpha Rho	American architect, best known for designing the headquarters building of the Johnson Publishing Company in downtown Chicago, Illinois. He was the first African-American architect to design a high-rise building in Chicago.	
William Gaston Pearson	Durham (NC) Alumni	One of the organizers of North Carolina Mutual Life Insurance Company, the Fraternal Bank and Trust Company, Southern Fidelity and Surety Company, as well as Banker's Fire Insurance Company;	
Guy Primus	Lambda Delta	COO of Overbrook Entertainment; named one of Urban Influence Magazine's "Men of Influence 2009"	
Roy Roberts	Grand Rapids (MI) Alumni	Former executive with General Motors;	
Harvey C. Russell Jr.	Alpha Upsilon	American businessman. He was the vice president of PepsiCo and made history as the first Black officer of a major U.S. multinational corporation.	
Donald P. Ryder	Beta	American architect and educator. He designed many buildings as the co-founder of Bond Ryder & Associates with J. Max Bond Jr., and was a professor emeritus at the City College of New York, where he taught from 1972 to 2001.	
Max Siegel	Indianapolis (IN) Alumni	CEO of USA Track & Field;	
Howard Sims	Sigma	American architect, businessperson, and philanthropist, active in Detroit.	
Donald Andrew Spencer Sr.	Cincinnati (OH) Alumni	Noted Cincinnati businessman. Songwriter of many Kappa Alpha Psi songs;	
John W. Thompson	Alpha Xi	CEO of Virtual Instruments; chairman of the board of directors for Microsoft Corporation; former vice-president at IBM; former CEO of Symantec Corporation	
Carl Ware	Gamma Kappa	American businessman, philanthropist; Longtime Executive of Coca-Cola; 57th Laurel Wreath Laureate	

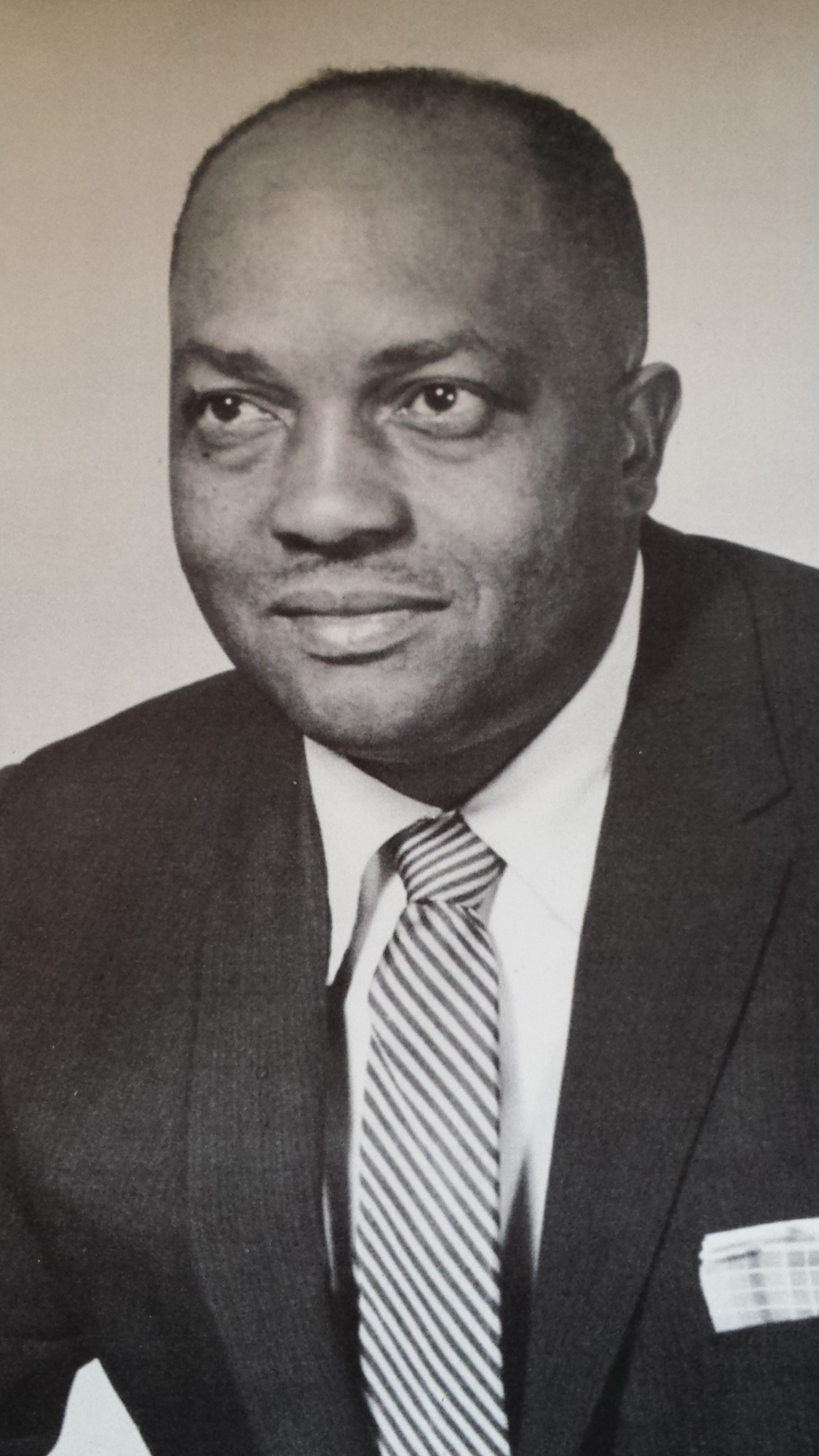
James A. Dallas

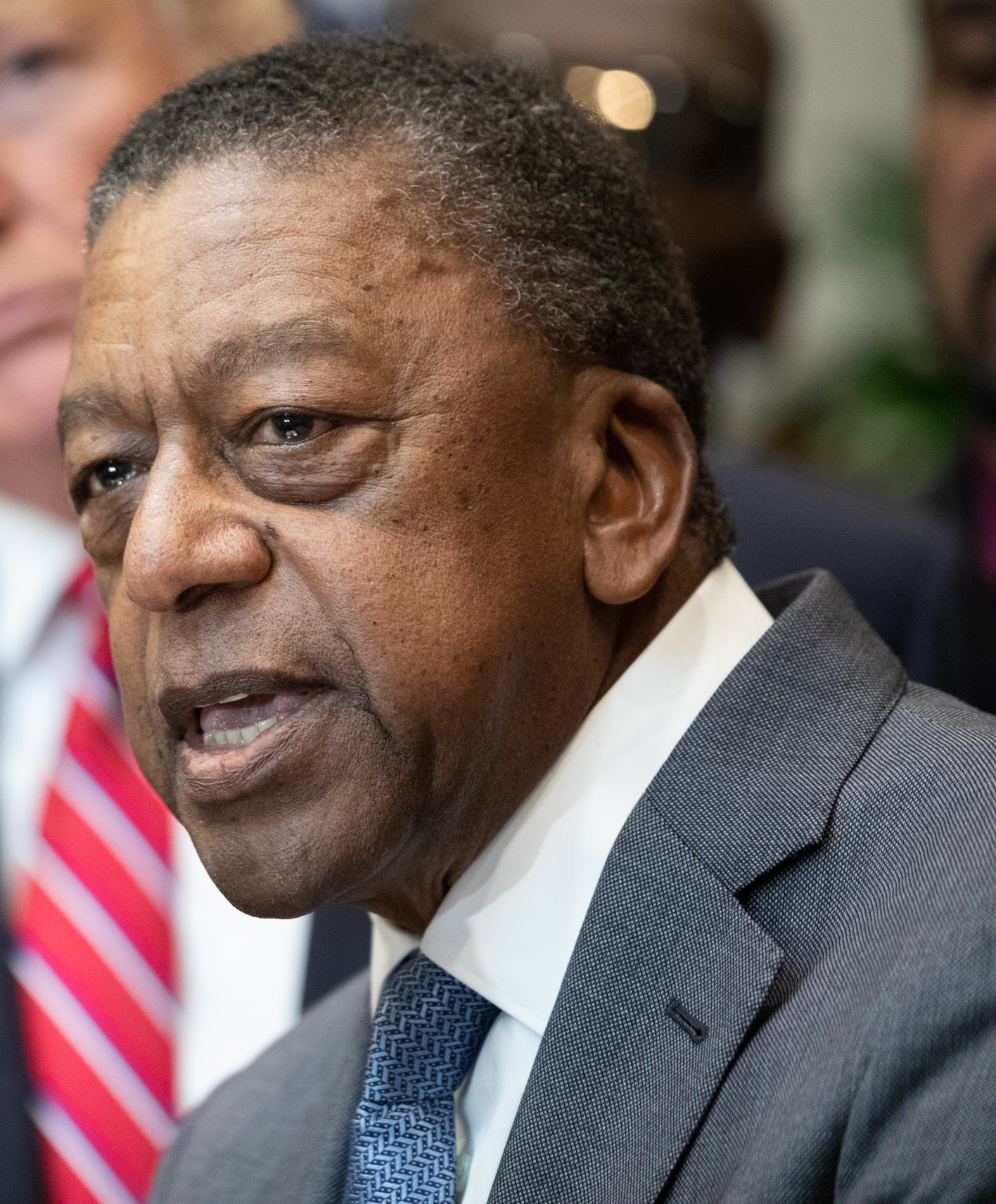
Robert L. Johnson

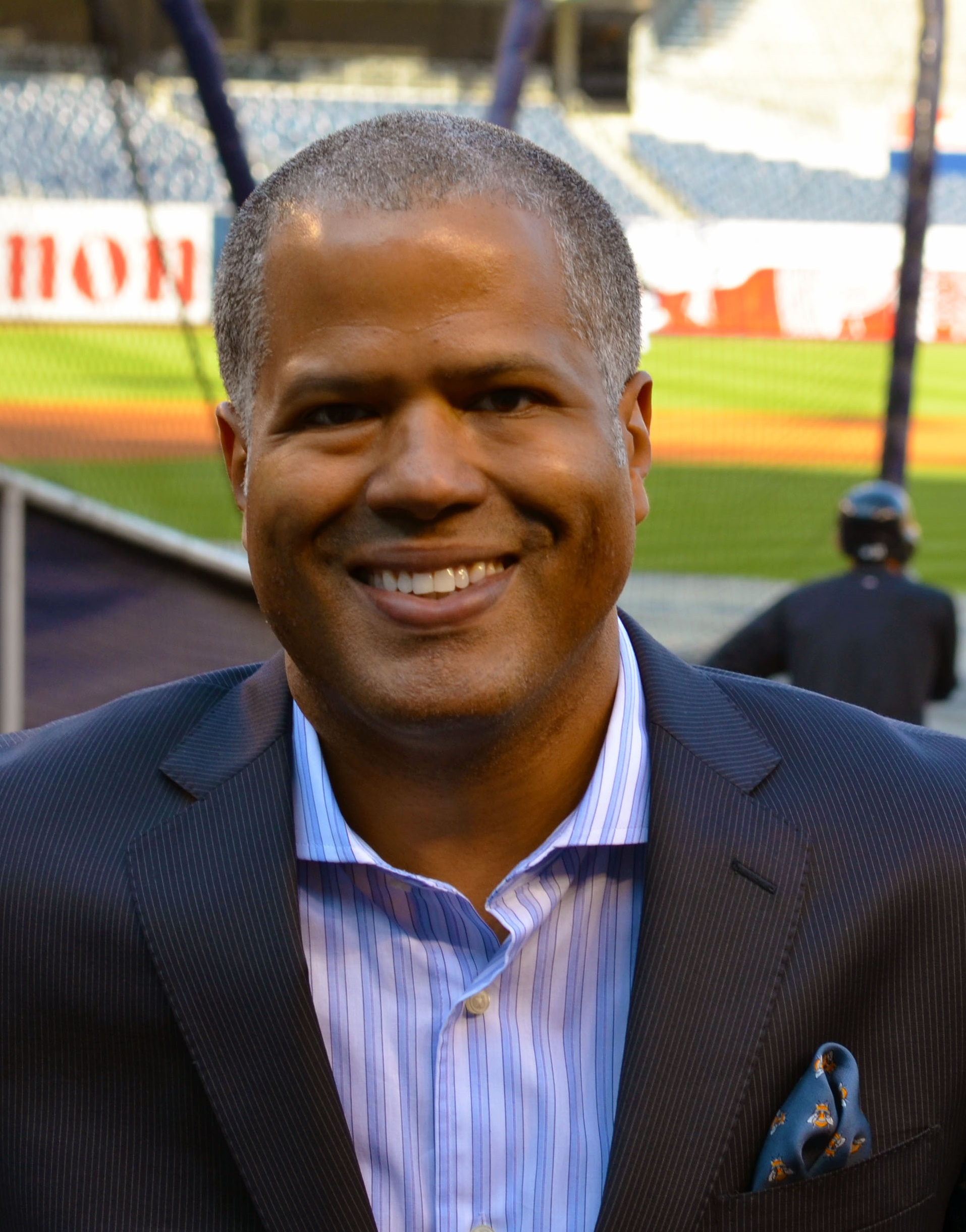
Guy Primus

== Government and politics ==
Name	Original chapter	Notability	Ref.
Archie Alexander	Gamma	Governor of US Virgin Islands; 6th Grand Polemarch; 4th Laurel Wreath laureate;	
Lionel Artis	Nu	Indianapolis civil servant and administrator; past Editor of the Kappa Alpha Psi Journal; 8th Laurel Wreath laureate	
Nelson Bascome	Alpha Iota	Minister of Health and Member of Parliament, Bermuda	
John A. Bell	Beta Tau	Director of the Education and Secondary Education Division of the Office of Civil Rights, United States Department of Health, Education, and Welfare	
Stephen K. Benjamin	Zeta Epsilon	Mayor of Columbia, South Carolina	
Sanford Bishop	Pi	Representative from Georgia	
Tom Bradley	Upsilon	Mayor of Los Angeles, California; 18th Grand Polemarch; 22nd Laurel Wreath laureate;	
Andrew Brimmer	Gamma Eta	First African American to have served as a governor of the Federal Reserve System	
George L. Brown	Mu	First Black Lieutenant Governor of Colorado; with his Kappa brother, California's Mervyn Dymally, he was one of the first two Black lieutenant governors since Reconstruction and outside of any southern state	
Albert Bryan	Mu Xi	Governor of the U.S. Virgin Islands	
Matthew G. Carter	Alpha Gamma	An American pastor and politician who served as the Mayor of Montclair, New Jersey, from 1968 to 1972	
Troy Carter	Beta Iota	Representative from Louisiana;	
Dwaine Caraway	Beta Upsilon	Former city councilman Dallas, Texas	
William Lacy Clay Jr.	St Louis (MO) Alumni	Representative from Missouri	
Michael B. Coleman	Columbus (OH) Alumni	Mayor of Columbus, Ohio	
Isaac N. Coggs	Iota	an American accountant, Democratic politician, and civil rights leader from Milwaukee, Wisconsin.	
Ian Conyers	Kappa Chi	Michigan Senator from District 4	
John Conyers	Alpha Beta	Representative from Michigan; chairman of the House Judiciary Committee; 52nd Laural Wreath laureate;	
George W. Crockett	Pi	Representative from Michigan; civil rights activist; 38th Laurel Wreath laureate;	
Sam Cunningham	Wilberforce (OH) Alumni	First African-American mayor of Waukegan, Illinois	
Gloster B. Current	Tau	Former deputy executive director of the National Association for the Advancement of Colored People (NAACP) and the National Director of Branches and Field Administration of the NAACP during the Civil Rights Movement;	
Mike Davis	Zeta Delta	California State Assembly member	
Rufus Davis	Theta Eta	Social and political activist, business executive, and former Mayor of Camilla, Georgia	
Andre Dickens	Lambda Delta	Mayor of Atlanta, Georgia; technology executive	
Mervyn M. Dymally	Upsilon	First black Lieutenant Governor of California; Representative from California	
Ben Espy	Zeta	American Democratic politician who served in the Ohio Senate and was a member of the Columbus City Council from 1982 to 1992.	
Walter E. Fauntroy	Alpha Gamma	Representative from Washington, D.C.; civil rights leader	
Adrian Fenty	Alpha Omega	Former mayor of Washington, D.C.	
Homer Floyd	Mu	Retired Executive Director of the Pennsylvania Human Relations Commission (PHRC)]	
Aaron D. Ford	Las Vegas (NV) Alumni	State Senate Majority Leader Nevada	
Johnny Ford	Beta Phi	Former Mayor of Tuskegee, Alabama	
Jason Frierson	Theta Sigma	Speaker of the Nevada State Assembly	
Wilson Frost	Alpha Delta	Longtime Chicago, Illinois alderman	
Truman Gibson	Iota	Lawyer, Government advisor, and later influential boxing promoter who played a unique and unheralded role in the Civil Rights Movement, primarily as a member of the "Black Cabinet" of Presidents Franklin D. Roosevelt and Harry S. Truman.	
William F. Gibson	Beta Rho	Dentist, Civil Rights activist, and former chairman of the NAACP	
Wilson Goode	Philadelphia (PA) Alumni	First African-American Mayor of Philadelphia	
Curtis Graves	Beta Upsilon	Former Texas House of Representatives	
Elihu Harris	Gamma Alpha	Mayor of Oakland, California	
Alcee Hastings	Alpha Delta	Representative from Florida; Federal Judge; 59th Laurel Wreath laureate;	
Reginald Hawkins	Alpha Epsilon	First African-American to run for Governor of North Carolina. Dentist. Civil rights activist who played a central role in integrating Charlotte schools, hospitals, and public spaces.	
John Hayden Jr.	Beta Nu	Police Commissioner of the St. Louis	
Wade Henderson	Washington (DC) Alumni	Former president of the Leadership Conference on Civil and Human Rights	
Dennis Hightower	Xi	Former Army officer, retired business executive, college educator, and public servant who was the United States deputy secretary of commerce from 2009 to 2010.	
Alvin Holmes	Beta Zeta	Former Alabama House of Representatives	
Alphonso Jackson	Epsilon Eta	13th United States Secretary of Housing and Urban Development (HUD)	
Lester G. Jackson	Epsilon Psi	Georgia state senator	
Hakeem Jeffries	Mu Kappa	Representative from New York; House Minority Leader since 2022	
Glenn Ivey	Hyattsville-Landover (MD) Alumni	Representative from Maryland;	
Richard Lee Jones	Alpha	Former United States Ambassador to Liberia 1955-1959; U.S. Army General;	
Vernon Jones	Alpha Kappa	CEO of DeKalb County, Georgia; Senator from Georgia 2008 candidate	
Joe Lang Kershaw	Miami (FL) Alumni	Florida politician and educator	
Arthur B. McCaw	Eta	Civil servant and civil rights activist active in Nebraska	
Donald McEachin	Beta Kappa (Charter member: Kappa Chi)	U.S. House of Representatives member from Virginia	
James Perkins Jr.	Gamma Phi	First African-American Mayor of Selma, Alabama	
Edward J. Perkins	Alexandria-Fairfax (VA) Alumni	US Ambassador to Liberia, South Africa, the United Nations, and Australia	
Kwame Raoul	Theta Zeta	State Attorney General for Illinois; former Illinois state representative	
Brensil Rolle	Bahamas Alumni	Member of Parliament, The Bahamas	
Kasim Reed	Atlanta (GA) Alumni	Mayor of Atlanta	
Julian Russell	Epsilon Alpha	Senator, the Bahamas	
Charles E. Samuels Jr.	Kappa Kappa	8th Director of the Federal Bureau of Prisons; its first African-American director	
Carl B. Stokes	Alpha Omega	Mayor of Cleveland, first black mayor of a major US city	
Louis Stokes	Alpha Omega	First African-American Congressman from Ohio; civil rights lawyer; 51st Laurel Wreath Laureate	
John F. Street	Philadelphia (PA) Alumni	Mayor of Philadelphia	
Danny Tabor		Mayor of Inglewood, California	
Bennie Thompson	Gamma Rho	Representative from Mississippi; Chairman of House Homeland Security Committee; 71st Laurel Wreath Laureate	
Wellington Webb	Denver (CO) Alumni	Mayor of Denver Former mayor of Denver, CO; 54th Laurel Wreath laureate of Kappa Alpha Psi	
Michael Weeks	Bermuda Alumni	Member of Parliament, Bermuda	
Jesse White	Beta Zeta	Secretary of State of Illinois	
Albert Wynn	Beta Epsilon	Former member of the U.S. House of Representatives from Maryland	

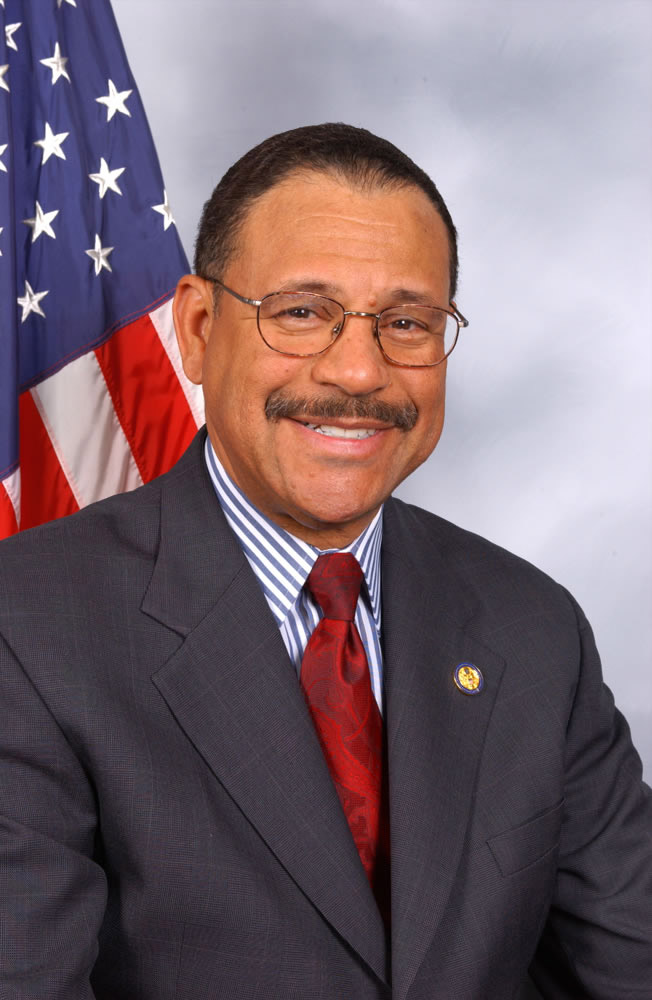
Sanford Bishop

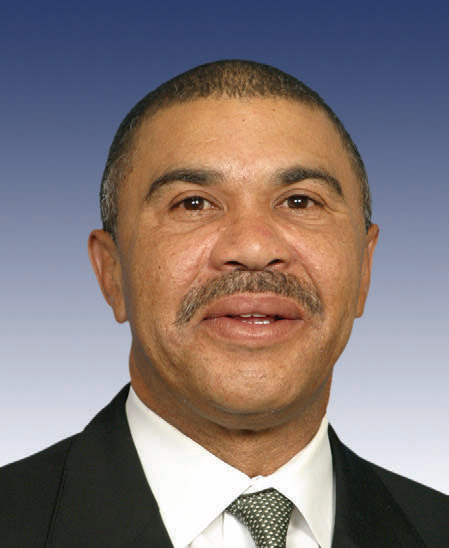
William Clay

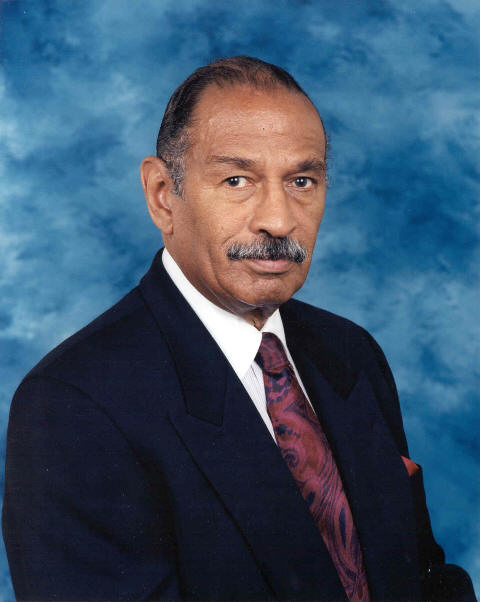
John Conyers

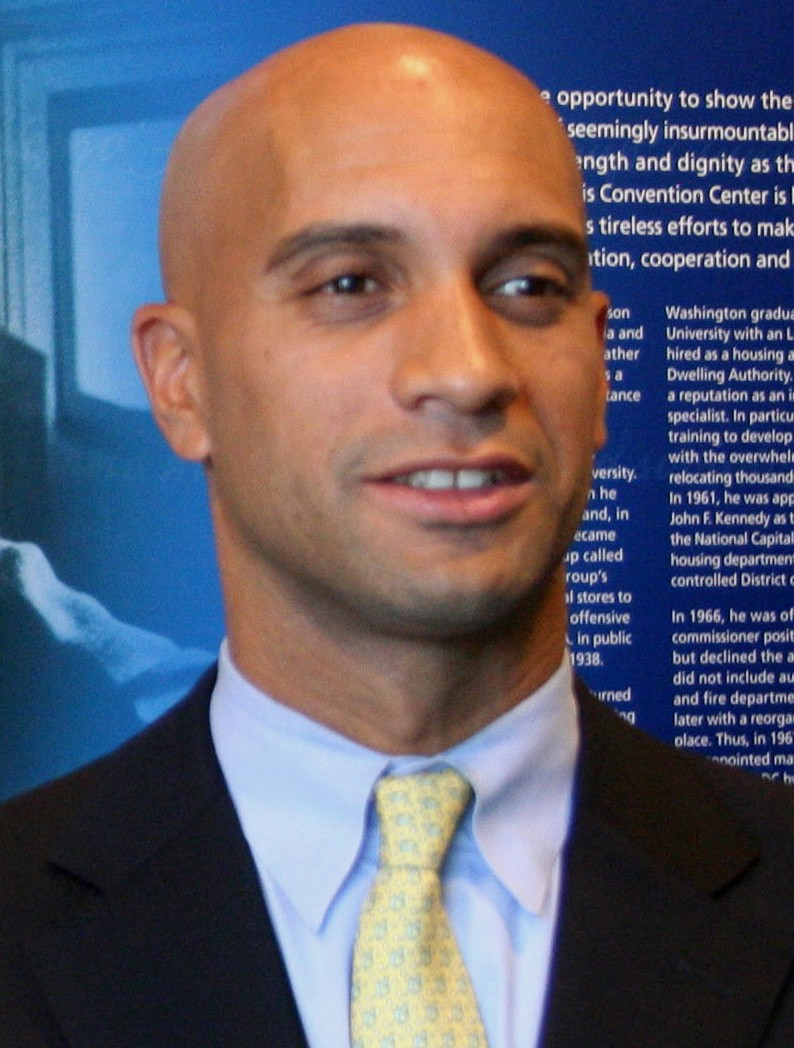
Adrian Fenty

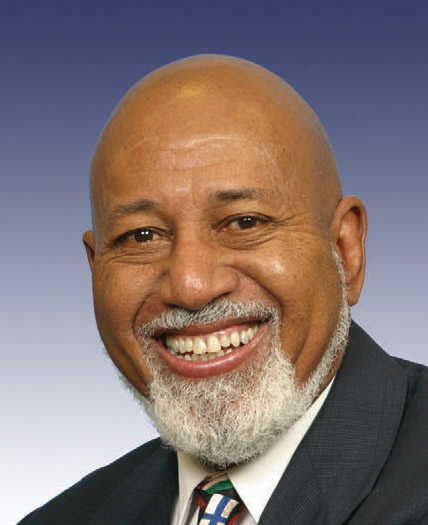
Alcee Hastings

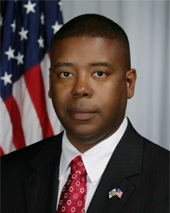
Charles E. Samuels, Jr.

== Law ==
Name	Original chapter	Notability	Ref.
Marvin S. Arrington Sr.	Gamma Kappa	Fulton (GA) County Judge, former Fulton (GA) County Commissioner	
Shon Barnes	Epsilon Alpha	An American law enforcement officer who served as the chief of the Seattle Police Department from 2025 to 2026.	
A. A. Birch Jr.	Epsilon	First African American to serve as Chief Justice of the Tennessee Supreme Court	
A. Scott Bolden	Pi	Noted Attorney and television political commentator.	
Robert Brokenburr	Indianapolis (IN) Alumni	Indianapolis-based attorney, civil rights leader, and Indiana state senator.	
James Clayborne Jr.	Alpha Theta	A member of the Illinois Senate representing the 57th District from his appointment in 1995 until 2019	
Johnnie Cochran	Upsilon	Defense attorney, best known for his role in the legal defense during the O. J. Simpson murder case	
Charles Swinger Conley	Beta Zeta	Montgomery (AL) County attorney, civil rights leader, and Alabama's first Black judge of the Court of Common Pleas in Macon County, AL.	
William Cousins	Beta	Retired Illinois State Appellate Judge; Former Chicago Alderman,	
George Crockett III	Pi	Judge, Recorder's Court (Detroit); served on the same bench as his father, Judge George Crockett, Jr.	
Gonzalo P. Curiel	Alpha	District Court Judge, United States District Court for the Southern District of California; appointed by President Barack Obama	
Henry Frye	Alpha Nu	First African American chief justice of the North Carolina Supreme Court; 53rd Laurel Wreath Laureate	
William P. Greene Jr.	Tau	Former judge on the United States Court of Appeals for Veterans Claims	
George Edward Chalmer Hayes	Washington (DC) Alumni	Civil rights attorney; 15th Laurel Wreath laureate	
Nathaniel R. Jones	Beta Pi	Judge, U.S. Court of Appeals for the Sixth Circuit; former NAACP General Counsel; Laurel Wreath Laureate	
L. Amasa Knox	Kansas City (MO) Alumni	Noted Attorney and Missouri state legislator.	
George N. Leighton	Xi	Retired Cook County (IL) Circuit Court Judge and Illinois Appellate Judge	
Conrad L. Mallett Jr.	Upsilon	Attorney, former Justice on the Michigan Supreme Court	
C. Vernon Mason	Pi	Attorney for the infamous Tawana Brawley case, Howard Beach incident.	
Loren Miller	Mu	American journalist, civil rights activist, attorney, and judge of the Superior Court of California, County of Los Angeles	
Billy G. Mills	Upsilon	Retired Los Angeles Superior Court judge and a former Los Angeles City Council member, serving from 1963 to 1974.	
Irvin Charles Mollison	Iota	First African American to serve on the United States Customs Court.	
James D. Montgomery	Beta	Chicago, Illinois-based attorney	
Donald Gaines Murray	Alpha Iota	Central figure in Murray v. Pearson (1935), which ruled that the University of Maryland School of Law's policy of racial segregation was unconstitutional	
Theodore R. Newman Jr.	Chi	First African American to serve as Chief Justice of the District of Columbia Court of Appeals	
T. Gillis Nutter	Tau	Civil Rights activist, NAACP leader, 3rd Laurel Wreath laureate	
Eugene K. Pettis	Zeta Phi	First African American to serve as president of the Florida Bar	
Kenneth Polite	Theta Iota	Assistant attorney general for the criminal division in the United States Department of Justice. He previously served as a United States Attorney for the Eastern District of Louisiana from 2013 to 2017.	
Freeman Ransom	Indianapolis (IN) Alumni	Indianapolis-based attorney and businessman.	
John W. Rogers Sr.	Iota	Illinois judge, attorney, and Tuskegee Airman;	
George H. Starke	Pi	Broke the color line as the first African-American law student at the University of Florida.	
Percy Sutton	New York (NY) Alumni	Attorney and civil rights activist; attorney for Malcolm X	

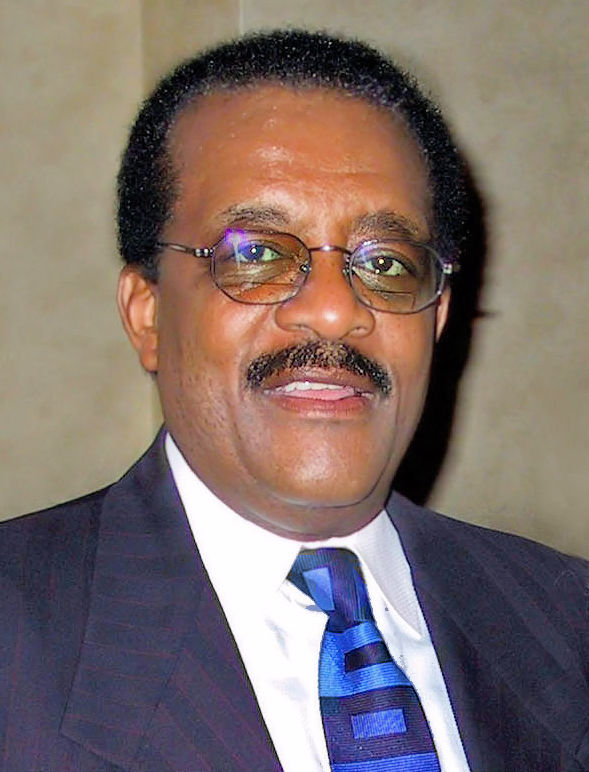
Johnnie Cochran

== Literature ==
Name	Original chapter	Notability	Ref.
Lerone Bennett Jr.	Pi	Best selling author; Author of Before the Mayflower; editor of Ebony	
LeAlan Jones	Theta Eta	Author of Our America: Life and Death on the South Side of Chicago	
C. Eric Lincoln	Beta Mu	an American scholar. He wrote several books, including sociological works such as The Black Church Since Frazier (1974) and Race, Religion and the Continuing American Dilemma (1984), as well as fiction and poetry.	

== Military ==
Name	Original chapter	Notability	Ref.
Frederick C. Branch	Alpha Epsilon	First African-American officer in the United States Marine Corps	
Daniel James Jr.	Nashville (TN) Alumni	First African-American four-star general; 28th Laurel Wreath laureate	
George L. Knox II	Nu	Combat fighter pilot; Tuskegee Airmen	
Henry B. Perry	Tuskegee (AL) Alumni	Combat fighter pilot; Tuskegee Airmen	
Leslie C. Smith	Iota Pi	Retired United States Army lieutenant general who last served as the 66th Inspector General of the United States Army. The 84th Laurel Weath Laureate of Kappa Alpha Psi.	
Robert W. Smith III	Beta Epsilon	Major General in the United States Army Reserve	
Dennis L. Via	Alpha Phi	Four-star General; 18th Commander of the United States Army Materiel Command; 72nd Laurel Wreath laureate	

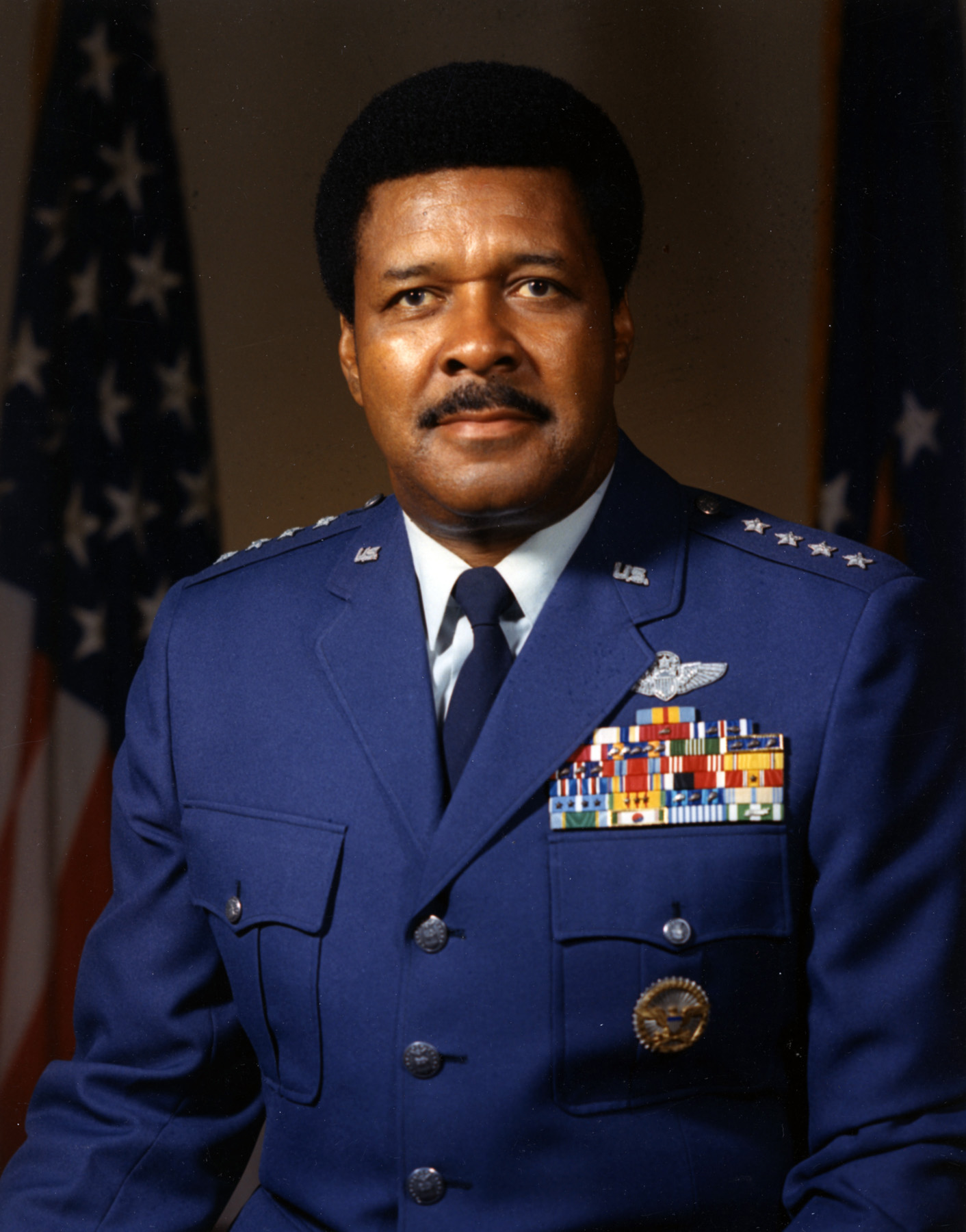
Daniel James, Jr.

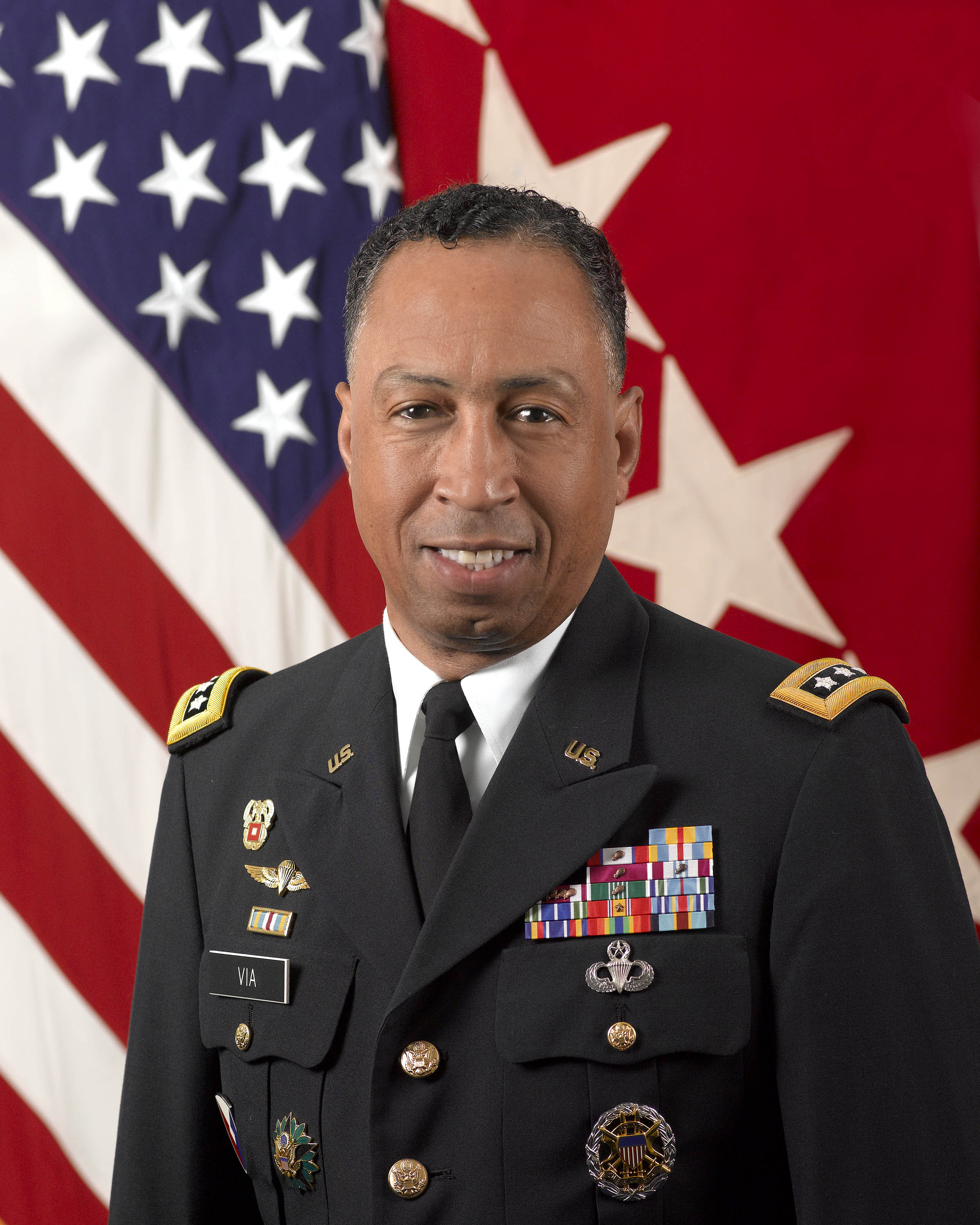
Dennis L. Via

== Religion ==
Name	Original chapter	Notability	Ref.
Ralph David Abernathy	Beta Zeta	American civil rights activist, Baptist minister, leader of the civil rights movement, and close friend and mentor of Martin Luther King Jr. He collaborated with King and E. D. Nixon to create the Montgomery Improvement Association, co-created and was an executive board member of SCLC; led the Poor People's Campaign in Washington, D.C., as well as other marches and demonstrations for disenfranchised Americans. He also served as an advisory committee member of the Congress on Racial Equality	
Jamal Harrison Bryant	Baltimore (MD) Alumni	American minister, author, and former political candidate. He is the senior pastor of New Birth Missionary Baptist Church. Former pastor of Empowerment Temple AME Church in Baltimore, Bryant has appeared on BET's Meet the Faith, CNN, C-SPAN, and Politically Incorrect, and served as a panelist on the national town hall meetings entitled "The State of Black America" and "The State of the Black Doctor."	
Calvin O. Butts	Pi	an American academic administrator and a senior pastor of the Abyssinian Baptist Church, which historically was the largest black church in New York City. He established the Abyssinian Development Corporation, a $500 million engine in housing and commercial development in Harlem, and was president of the State University of New York College at Old Westbury.	
W. Sterling Cary	Pi	President of the National Council of Churches from 1972 to 1975	
Leon Finney Jr.	Chicago (IL) Alumni	Late founder and pastor of Metropolitan Apostolic Community Church in Chicago, IL. Finney was also known for his association with The Woodlawn Organization, a community development initiative in the Woodlawn neighborhood of Chicago.	
Eddie L. Long	Alpha Kappa	Pastor of New Birth Missionary Baptist Church.	
Smokie Norful	Gamma Sigma	American gospel singer and pianist.	
Leon Sullivan	Tau	A Baptist minister, a civil rights leader and social activist focusing on the creation of job training opportunities for African Americans, a longtime General Motors Board Member, and an anti-Apartheid activist. A Presidential Medal of Freedom awardee, Spingarn Award honoree, and the 28th Laurel Wreath Laureate of Kappa Alpha Psi.	
Gardner C. Taylor	Alpha Omega	An American Baptist preacher. He became known as "the dean of American preaching. A Presidential Medal of Freedom awardee.	
William Tecumseh Vernon	Kansas City (MO) Alumni	American educator, minister, and bishop in the African Methodist Episcopal Church who served as president of Western University beginning in 1896 and Register of the Treasury from 1906 to 1911.	
Frederick B. Williams	Pi	Late Canon of the Church of the Intercession in Harlem, NY.	

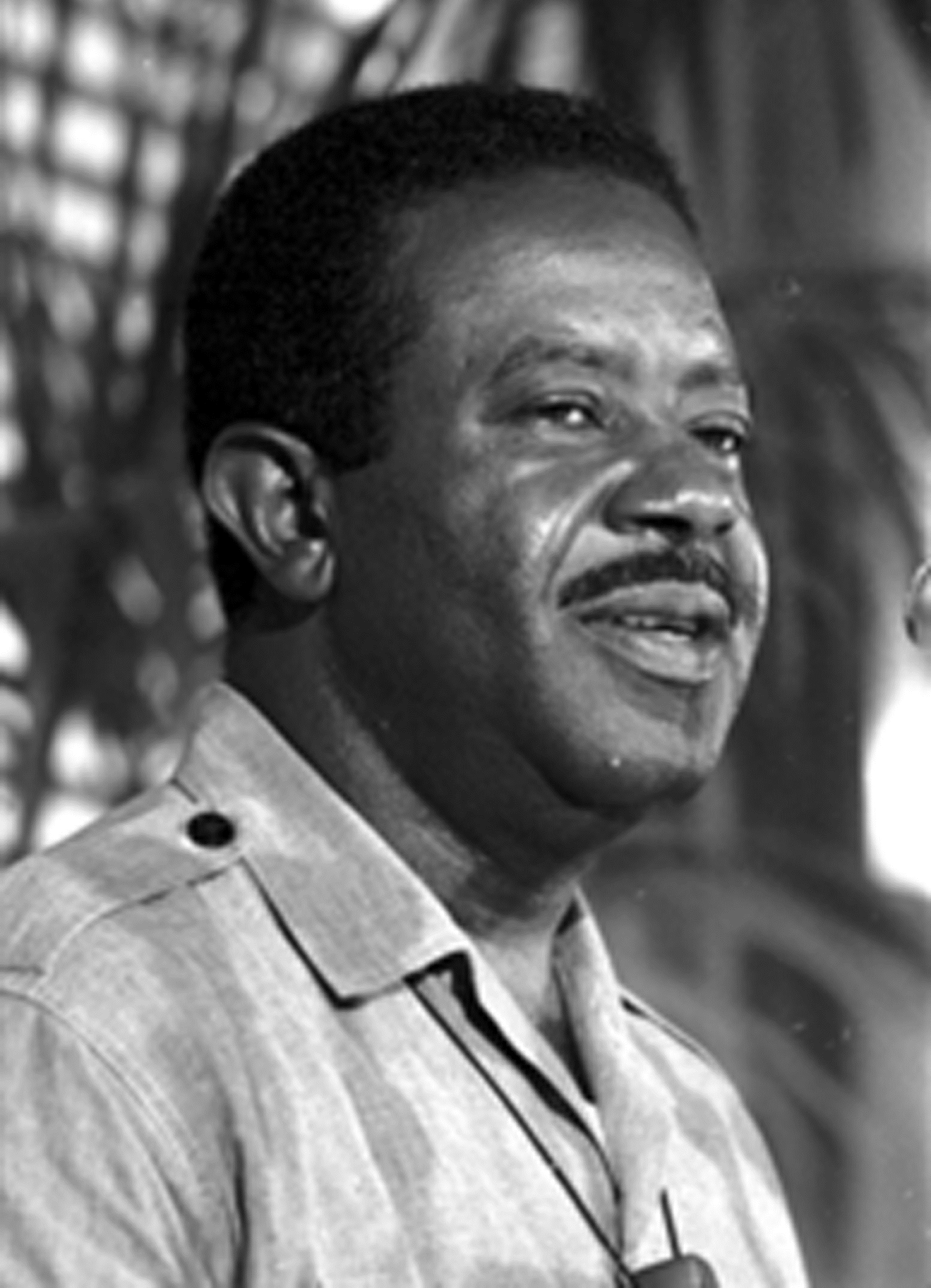
Ralph Abernathy

== Science and medicine ==
Name	Original chapter	Notability	Ref.
Norman B. Anderson	Washington (DC) Alumni	American scientist	
Emmett J. Conrad	Alpha Signa	Late surgeon and Dallas, Texas civic leader.	
Arthur Falls	Theta	Chicago-based African-American physician and activist	
Henry Foster	Pi	Surgeon General of the United States nominee	
Bernard A. Harris Jr.	Eta Lambda	Astronaut; first African American to walk in space; 50th Laurel Wreath laureate;	
Richard E. Holmes	Alpha Chi	Mississippi-based medical doctor	
Myron Rolle	Gamma Sigma	Pediatric Neurosurgeon, former NFL safety, and Rhodes Scholar; known for bridging sports and medicine.	
John P. Turner	Philadelphia (PA) Alumni	Surgeon and staff president of Frederick Douglass Memorial Hospital and Training School and first Black member of the Philadelphia Board of Education	
J. Ernest Wilkins Jr.	Iota	an American nuclear scientist, mechanical engineer, and mathematician. A child prodigy, he attended the University of Chicago at the age of 13, becoming its youngest-ever student.	

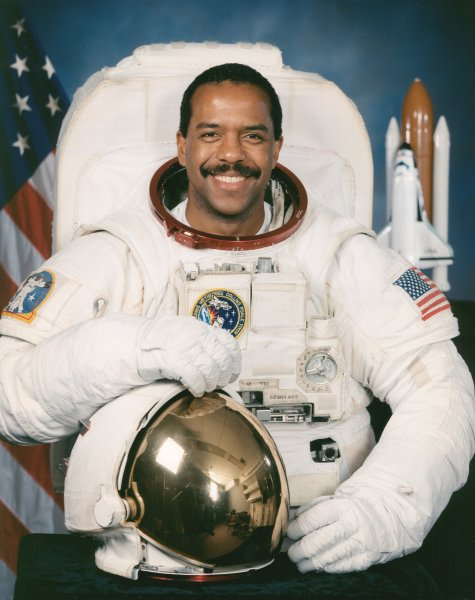
Bernard Harris

== Sports ==
=== Baseball ===
Name	Original chapter	Notability	Ref.
Emmett Ashford	Upsilon	First African American umpire in Major League Baseball	
Larry Bradford	Gamma Kappa	Former MLB pitcher with the Atlanta Braves	
Harvey Branch	Beta Zeta	Former minor league pitcher and MLB player for the St. Louis Cardinals	
Don Buford	Beta Omega	Former MLB player for the Chicago White Sox and Baltimore Orioles; former minor and major league coach	
Donn Clendenon	Pi	Former MLB first baseman; MVP in the 1969 World Series with the New York Mets	
Sammy Drake	Beta Tau	Former MLB infielder with Chicago Cubs and New York Mets in mid to late 1960s	
Solly Drake	Beta Tau	Former MLB outfielder with several MLB teams in mid to late 1950s	
Kenny Lofton	Delta Omicron	Former MLB outfielder	
Lloyd McClendon	Zeta Alpha	Hitting coach for Detroit Tigers. Former MLB outfielder; former manager of the Pittsburgh Pirates and Seattle Mariners	
Walter Owens	Gamma Beta	Former pitcher and outfielder who played in Negro league baseball. Coached baseball and basketball for 54 years, 34 of them at Northern Illinois University before retiring in 2007.	
Ted Savage	Alpha Mu	Former MLB outfielder with numerous clubs;	
Nate Smith	Alpha Theta	Former minor league catcher;	
Ron Teasley	Alpha Beta	Former professional baseball player.	
Charlie Williams	Epsilon Kappa	African American umpire in Major League Baseball	
Reggie Williams	Alpha Sigma	Former MLB player for the Los Angeles Dodgers and Cleveland Indians	

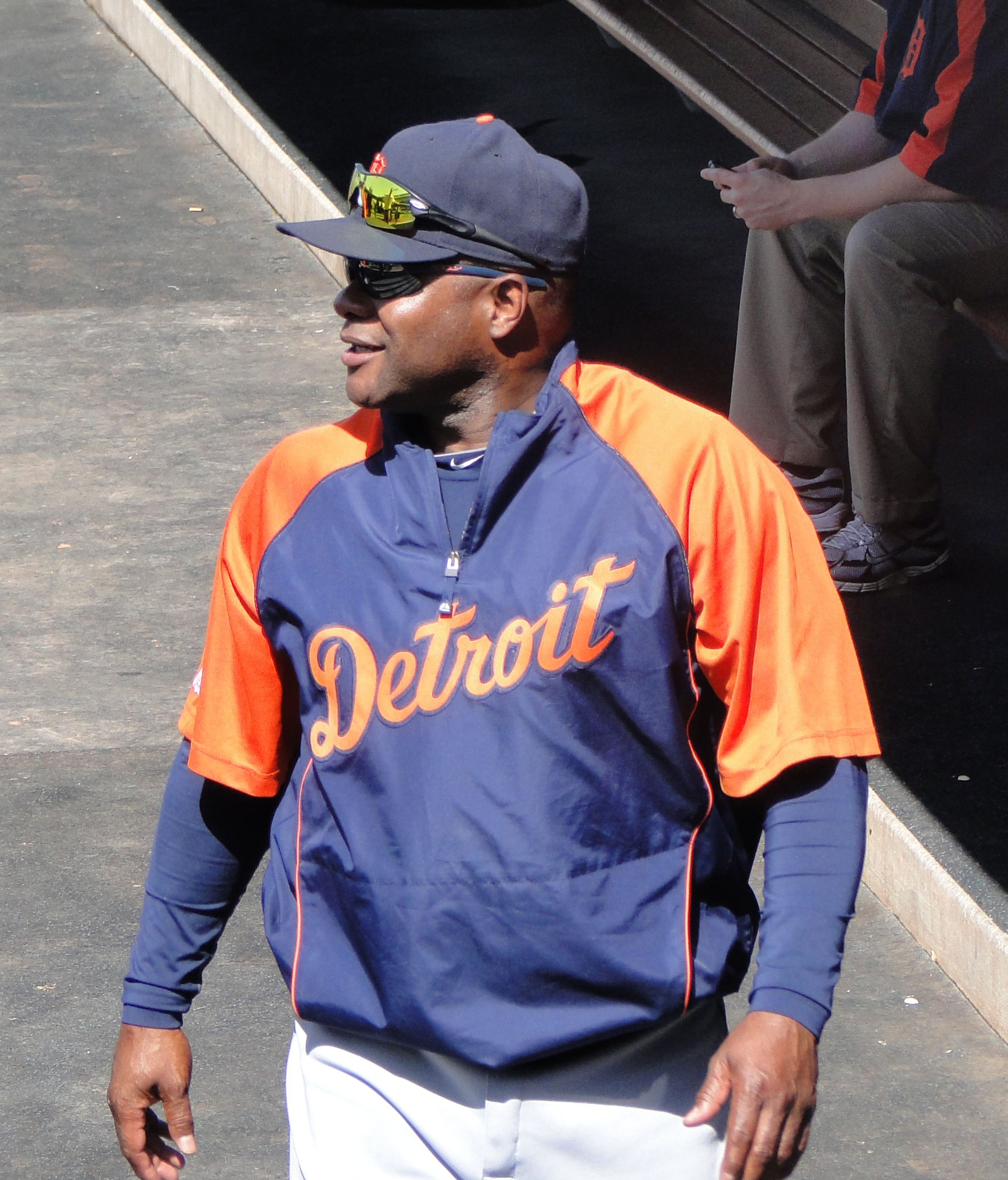
Lloyd McClendon

=== Basketball ===
Name	Original chapter	Notability	Ref.
Cliff Anderson	Delta Eta	Former NBA guard with the Los Angeles Lakers, Cleveland Cavaliers, Philadelphia 76ers and Denver Rockets of the ABA.	
Bernie Bickerstaff	Delta Epsilon	Assistant coach for the Cleveland Cavaliers; NBA coach and front office executive	
Charlie Brown	Gamma Eta	Former collegiate All-American and former amateur basketball player	
Cliff Anderson	Delta Eta	Former NBA guard with the Los Angeles Lakers, Cleveland Cavaliers, Philadelphia 76ers and Denver Rockets of the ABA.	
Jeff Capel II	Epsilon Beta	Former men's head basketball coach Old Dominion University, North Carolina A&T University and Fayetteville State University; former NBA assistant coach Philadelphia 76ers and Charlotte Bobcats	
Wilt Chamberlain	Mu	Former NBA center; Basketball Hall of Fame, 1978; College Basketball Hall of Fame, 2006	
John Chaney	Gamma Theta	Distinguished Cheyney University of Pennsylvania and Temple University head coach; Basketball Hall of Fame 2001	
Brandon Childress	Omicron Sigma	American professional basketball player for Obradoiro of the Liga ACB. He played college basketball for the Wake Forest University.	
Erick Dampier	Eta Upsilon	Former NBA center	
Harold Ellis	Pi	Former NBA Los Angeles Clippers Denver Nuggets forward; NBA team executive	
Caesar Felton Gayles	Pi (Charter Member)	Distinguished Langston University men's basketball head coach; College Basketball Hall of Fame 2014	
Nolden Gentry	Gamma	Former standout college basketball player at the University of Iowa in the late 1950s and 1960s.	
Penny Hardaway	Kappa Beta	Former Orlando Magic guard; 1996 Summer Olympics gold medalist; Current head basketball coach at University of Memphis;	
Leonard Hamilton	Zeta Kappa	former head basketball coach at Florida State University, Oklahoma State University, the University of Miami, and the Washington Wizards.	
Marques Haynes	Alpha Pi	Former Harlem Globetrotter; Naismith Memorial Basketball Hall of Fame, 1998	
Alan Henderson	Alpha	Former NBA forward	
Talen Horton-Tucker	Omega	Drafted by the NBA Los Angeles Lakers in 2019 NBA draft;	
Allan Houston	Mu Rho	Assistant general manager for the New York Knicks; former NBA guard; 2000 Summer Olympics gold medalist	
Wade Houston	Alpha Omicron	Former head basketball coach at University of Tennessee; first African-American head basketball coach in the Southeastern Conference (SEC)	
Melvin Hunt	Lambda Lambda	assistant coach of the Baylor Bears men's basketball and Atlanta Hawks	
Sam Jones	Boston (MA) Alumni	Former Boston Celtics Guard; Basketball Hall of Fame, 1984; College Basketball Hall of Fame 2006; ten-time NBA champion	
Maurice King	Mu	Retired professional basketball player; first African American player to start for the Kansas Jayhawks men's basketball team.	
Ron Knight	Beta Omega	Former NBA basketball player	
Edward Martin	Charleston (SC) Alumni	Retired head basketball coach at South Carolina State University and Tennessee State University	
Jerome Mincy	Kappa Kappa	Member of the Puerto Rican national basketball team 1983-2002	
Johnny Newman	Eta Xi	Former NBA forward	
Roman Penn	Omega	College point guard.	
Charles Ramsey	Delta Nu	Former men's head basketball coach Eastern Michigan University from 2005-2011	
Oscar Robertson	Beta Eta	Former NBA guard; Basketball Hall of Fame, 1980; College Basketball Hall of Fame, 2006; FIBA Hall of Fame, 2009; 1960 Summer Olympics gold medalist; the Oscar Robertson Trophy was named in his honor	
Bill Russell	Gamma Alpha	Former NBA center; first African-American inducted into the Basketball Hall of Fame; Basketball Hall of Fame, 1975; College Basketball Hall of Fame, 2006; FIBA Hall of Fame, 2007; 1956 Summer Olympics gold medalist; eleven-time NBA champion; awarded the 2011 Presidential Medal of Freedom; the NBA Finals Most Valuable Player Award was named in his honor; 1956 Summer Olympics gold medalist	
Mark Tatum	Iota Phi	NBA Deputy Commissioner and Chief Operating Officer (COO); first African-American Deputy Commissioner of the NBA	
Herschell Turner	Eta	Retired American professional basketball player. Former Harlem Globetrotters player.	
Darrell Walker	Iota Tau	Head basketball coach Clark Atlanta University former assistant coach for the New York Knicks; former head coach of NBA Toronto Raptors, former NBA guard	
George Wilson	Beta Eta	Retired NBA player; a member of the 1964 U.S. Men's basketball gold-medal-winning team.	

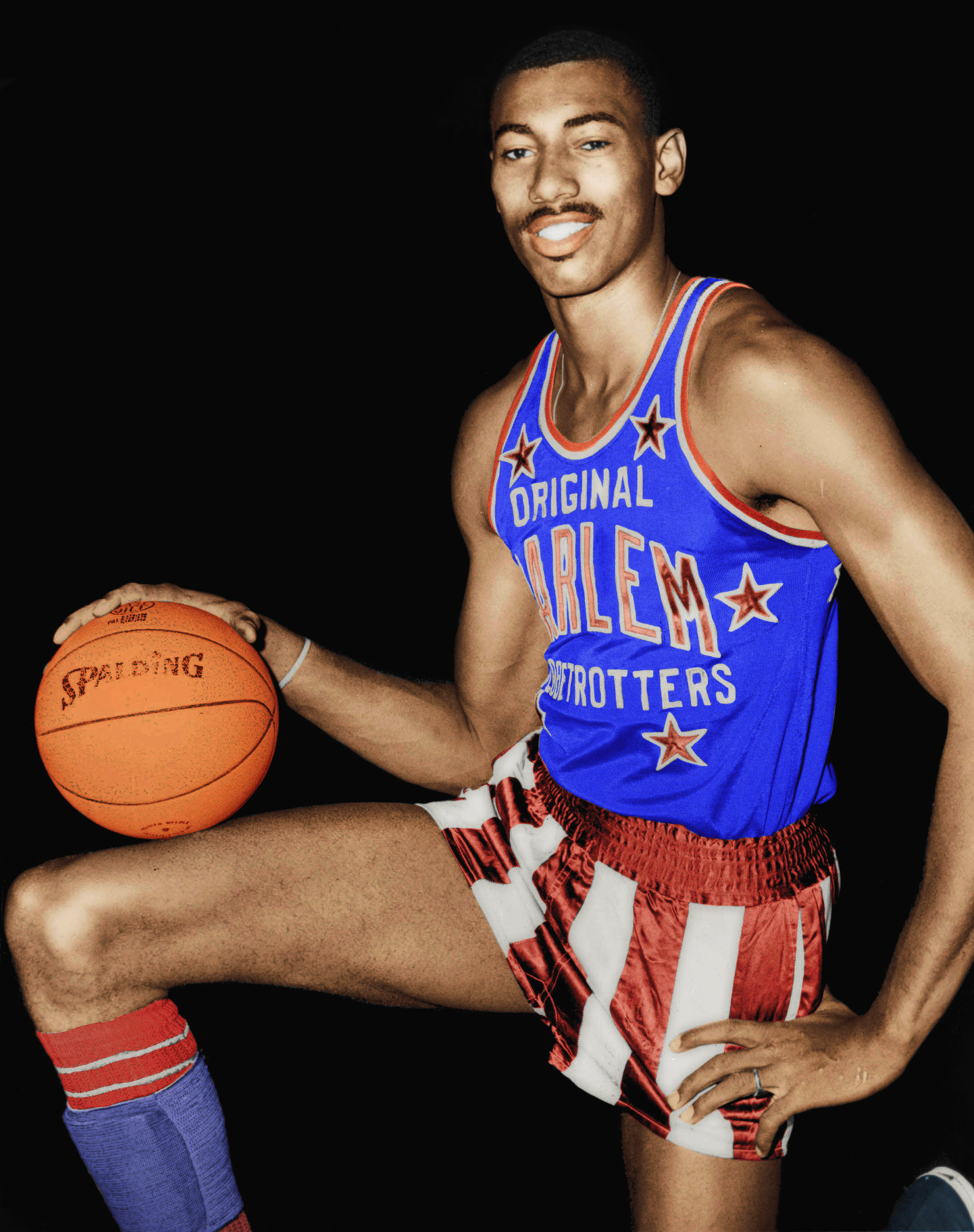
Wilt Chamberlain

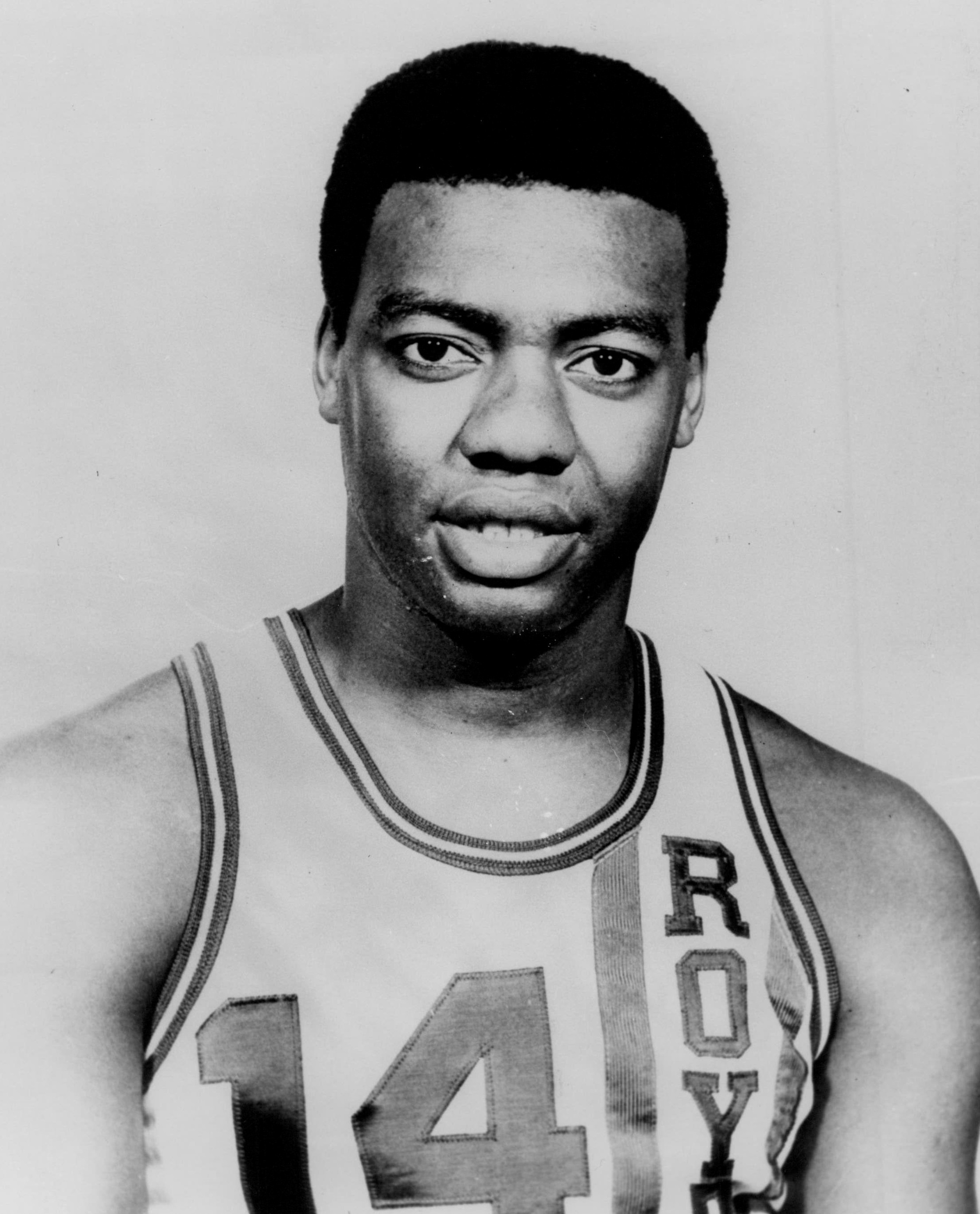
Oscar Robertson

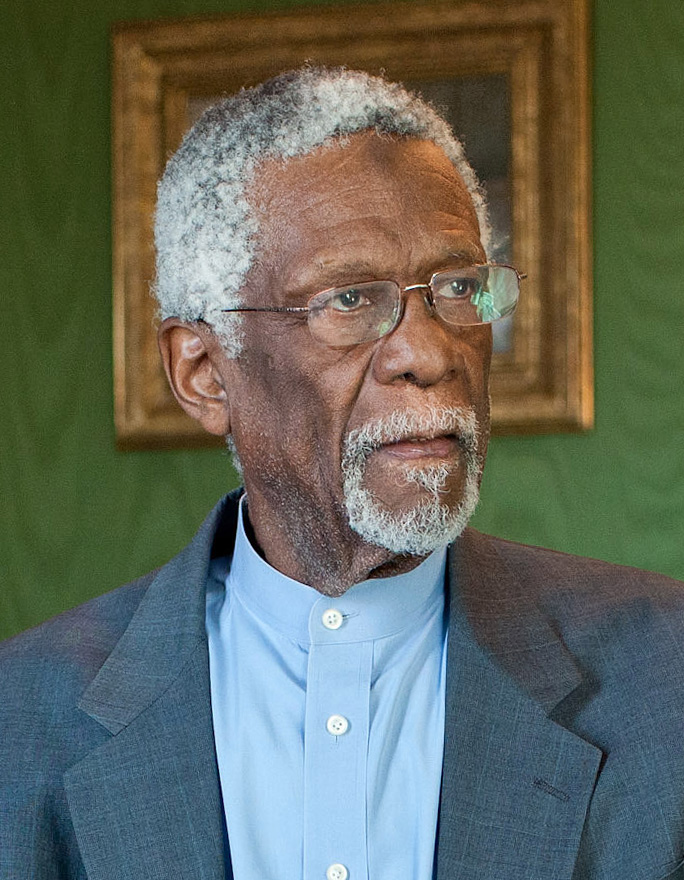
Bill Russell

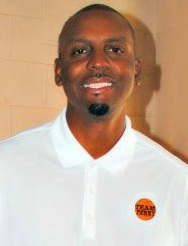
Penny Hardaway

=== American football ===
Name	Original chapter	Notability	Ref.
Spencer Anderson	Washington (DC) Alumni	American professional football guard for the Pittsburgh Steelers of the National Football League (NFL);	
Nnamdi Asomugha	Gamma Alpha	Retired Oakland Raiders All-Pro cornerback; philanthropist	
Chris Barclay	Omicron Sigma	Retired NFL running back	
Lem Barney	Delta Delta	Retired Detroit Lions All-Pro safety; Pro Football Hall of Fame, 1992	
Odell Barry	Beta Xi	Retired wide receiver Denver Broncos; former of mayor Northglenn, Colorado	
Reggie Barlow	Jacksonville (FL) Alumni	Retired Jacksonville Jaguars, Tampa Bay Buccaneers wide receiver; Head Coach Virginia State University	
Albert Bell	Eta Chi	Former NFL wide receiver	
Latin Berry	Delta Alpha	Former NFL defensive back with Los Angeles Rams and Cleveland Browns	
J. J. Birden	Delta Alpha	Former NFL wide receiver	
Johnny Bright	Omega	Former CFL running back, College Football Hall of Fame, 1984, Canadian Football Hall of Fame, 1970, three-time Grey Cup Champion	
Dana Brinson	Eta	Former wide receiver for NFL San Diego Chargers and Atlanta Falcons and the London Monarchs of the World League	
Bob Brown	Eta	Retired All-Pro NFL offensive tackle with Philadelphia Eagles, Los Angeles Rams and Oakland Raiders All-Pro safety; Pro Football Hall of Fame, College Football Hall of Fame	
Reggie Brown	Delta Alpha	Former NFL running back with Atlanta Falcons and Philadelphia Eagles and USFL Arizona Outlaws	
Steve Brown	Delta Alpha	Former Houston Oilers cornerback; NFL secondary coach	
Earnest Byner	Eta Psi	Former NFL Cleveland Browns, Washington Redskins and Baltimore Ravens running back, NFL running back coach	
Jim Caldwell	Gamma	Former head coach of the Detroit Lions; former head coach of the Indianapolis Colts and Wake Forest Demon Deacons; former offensive coordinator of the Baltimore Ravens	
Drew Carter	Zeta	Former Carolina Panthers, Oakland Raiders wide receiver	
Maurice Carthon	Theta Mu	Former assistant head coach for the Kansas City Chiefs; Former fullback for New York Giants and USFL New Jersey Generals; Two-time Super Bowl champion	
Marino Casem	Jackson (MS) Alumni	Former head coach of Alcorn State University, Southern University, and Alabama State University	
Greg Childs	Iota Tau	Former Minnesota Vikings wide receiver	
Don Clark	Zeta	Retired CFL running back; All-American on the 1957 National Champions Ohio State University football team.	
Ryan Clark	Nu Iota	Former NFL Pittsburgh Steelers defensive back; host and NFL analyst on ESPN	
Dextor Clinkscale	Alpha Lambda	Former NFL Dallas Cowboys defensive back;	
Jerome Couplin III	Xi Theta	Former Detroit Lions, Philadelphia Eagles, Buffalo Bills and Los Angeles Rams safety. Former CFL Linebacker for the Hamilton Tiger-Cats. Current safety for the Orlando Apollos	
B. J. Daniels	Zeta Chi	Former NFL Seattle Seahawks, Houston Texans QB	
Willie Davis	Gamma Psi	Retired NFL Defensive end with the Green Bay Packers; Pro Football Hall of Fame.	
Ron Dickerson	Beta Psi	Former head coach of Temple University and Alabama State University	
Earl Faison	Alpha	Retired professional football player who was a defensive end in the American Football League (AFL) between 1960 and 1966.	
Donnie Fletcher	Chi	Former NFL cornerback	
Jamar Fletcher	Beta Omicron	Former NFL cornerback; recipient of Jim Thorpe Award and Jack Tatum Trophy	
Terrell Fletcher	Beta Omicron	Retired NFL running back San Diego Chargers	
Wallace Francis	Gamma Sigma	Retired NFL wide receiver	
Howard C. Gentry	Alpha Xi	Former head coach of Tennessee State University.	
Chris Gragg	Iota Tau	Buffalo Bills tight end	
David Grant	Epsilon Chi	Former NFL defensive lineman	
Robert Green	Eta Omega	Former NFL running back	
Bobby Grier	Beta Epsilon	First African American football player to break the color barrier of the collegiate Sugar Bowl game when his Pittsburgh Panthers played in the 1956 Sugar Bowl held in New Orleans, LA against the Georgia Tech Yellow Jackets	
DeJuan Groce	Eta	Former NFL cornerback	
Mel Groomes	Alpha	Retired American football player and baseball coach. Former NFL offensive back with Detroit Lions	
Harold Hallman	Theta Delta	Former CFL Defensive tackle with the Toronto Argonauts	
Charlie Hardy	Delta Rho	Original Oakland Raider from the American Football League	
Bobby Harris	Lambda Pi	Former NFL/CFL offensive tackle	
Chick Harris	Gamma Iota	NFL assistant coach	
Corey Harris	Nu Rho	Former NFL safety	
Matthew Hatchette	Langston (OK) Alumni	Former NFL wide receiver	
Tim Hawthorne	Theta Delta	Former CFL Wide Receiver with the Calgary Stampeders	
John Henderson	Sigma	Retired Detroit Lions, Minnesota Vikings wide receiver; Head Coach Virginia State University	
Kahlil Hill	Gamma	Former NFL/CFL wide receiver	
Randal Hill	Miami (FL) Alumni	Former NFL wide receiver	
Randy Hilliard	Theta Lambda	Former NFL defensive back	
Bruce Holmes	Stockbridge-Jonesboro (GA) Alumni	Retired Minnesota Vikings and Kansas City Chiefs linebacker	
Earl Holmes	Alpha Xi	Former Pittsburgh Steelers linebacker	
DeAndre Houston-Carson	Xi Theta	NFL defensive back	
Hornsby Howell	Durham (NC) Alumni	Former head football coach at North Carolina A&T University; first African-American on the football coaching staff of the University of Georgia	
Lane Howell	Gamma Psi	Retired NFL lineman New York Giants Philadelphia Eagles	
D. J. Ivey	Iota Chi	NFL cornerback;	
Larron Jackson	Delta Omega	Retired NFL lineman	
Tony Jeter	Eta	Retired NFL tight end;	
Rickey Jackson	Kenner (LA) Alumni	Pro Football Hall of Fame inductee; Retired New Orleans Saints and San Francisco 49ers Pro Bowl linebacker	
Willie Jackson	Zeta Phi	Former NFL wide receiver	
John Henry Johnson	Gamma Iota	Pro Football Hall of Fame 1987; member of 49ers Million Dollar Backfield	
Ernest Jones	Zeta Epsilon	Los Angeles Rams linebacker	
Jimmy Jones	Beta Omicron	Retired Chicago Bears, Denver Broncos wide receiver;	
Kevin Jones	Theta Psi	Former Detroit Lions and Chicago Bears running back	
William Judson	Alpha Lambda	Former NFL Miami Dolphins cornerback;	
EJ Junior	Eta Chi	Former Arizona Cardinals and Miami Dolphins linebacker; two-time Pro Bowler	
Colin Kaepernick	Xi Phi	Former San Francisco 49ers quarterback	
Shaun King	St. Petersburg (FL) Alumni	Former NFL and Arena Football League quarterback; sports personality	
Kenard Lang	Orlando (FL) Alumni	Retired NFL defensive lineman	
Jerry Latin	Epsilon Omicron	Former NFL St. Louis Cardinals running back	
Cleo Lemon	Theta Mu	Former NFL/CFL quarterback	
Keenan Lewis	Iota Iota	New Orleans Saints cornerback	
Leo Lewis	Alpha Mu	Former CFL Winnipeg Blue Bombers running back, College Football Hall of Fame inductee 2005, Canadian Football Hall of Fame, 1973, four-time Grey Cup Champion	
Greg Lloyd Sr.	Gamma Zeta	Former Pittsburgh Steelers Pro Bowl linebacker	
Andre Lott	Mu Rho	Former NFL safety	
Lenny Lyles	Alpha Omicron	Former Baltimore Colts cornerback, Member of the 1958 NFL Champions	
Brandon Marshall	Lambda Omega	Chicago Bears All-Pro wide receiver; 2012 NFL Pro Bowl MVP; most receptions in a game in NFL history (21)	
Brandon Marshall	Xi Phi	Denver Broncos linebacker	
Jim Marshall	Zeta	Former Minnesota Vikings All-Pro defensive end; member of the famed Purple People Eaters defense;	
Chris Martin	Theta Delta	Former NFL Defensive End/LB with the Kansas City Chiefs	
Ollie Matson	Gamma Alpha	Pro Football Hall of Fame, 1972; College Football Hall of Fame, 1976; won bronze medal in the 400-meter run and a silver medal as part of the US 4x400-meter relay team in the 1952 Summer Olympics in Helsinki, Finland; member of the undefeated 1951 University of San Francisco football team	
Al Matthews	Austin (TX) Alumni	Retired NFL defensive back	
Jordan Matthews	Nu Rho	NFL wide receiver	
Pellom McDaniels	Iota Iota	Former Kansas City Chiefs, Atlanta Falcons defensive end	
Booger McFarland	St. Petersburg (FL) Alumni	Former Tampa Bay Buccaneers and Indianapolis Colts defensive tackle	
Buford McGee	Lambda Pi	Retired NFL running back	
Guy McIntyre	Zeta Iota	Former San Francisco 49ers Pro Bowl guard; three-time Super Bowl Champion with the San Francisco 49ers	
James McKinley	Gamma Beta	Former football player, coach, and businessman	
Bennie McRae	Sigma	Former Chicago Bears cornerback; Member of the 1963 NFL Champion Chicago Bears	
Ron Middleton	Theta Delta	Former NFL Tight End with the Washington Redskins	
Glyn Milburn	Lambda Nu	Former NFL special teams specialist	
Cleo Miller	Gamma Sigma	Retired NFL running back	
Jim Mitchell	Alpha Phi	Former NFL Detroit Lions lineman	
Steven Mitchell	Beta Omega	NFL Los Angeles Rams, Houston Texans wide receiver	
Zeke Moore	Alpha Mu	Former NFL cornerback	
Emery Moorehead	Beta Theta	Former New York Giants, Chicago Bears tight end / wide receiver, Member of the 1985 NFL Champions	
Kirk Morrison	Delta Epsilon	Former NFL linebacker	
Ace Mumford	Delta	Born Arnett W. Mumford; inducted into the College Football Hall of Fame in 2001; coached Southern University Jaguars to five national championships in football; coached Southern University to the 1941 national championship in basketball by taking the National Intercollegiate Invitational Basketball Tournament	
Cliff Odom	Iota Alpha	Retired NFL Baltimore Colts and Miami Dolphins linebacker	
Chris Oldham	Delta Alpha	Former NFL cornerback	
Jerry Patton	Eta	Retired NFL defensive lineman	
Ken Payne	Alpha Pi	Former NFL wide receiver	
Mike Perez	Delta Rho	Former NFL pro quarterback for multiple NFL and Arena Football teams	
Billy Pritchett	Epsilon Pi	Former NFL running back	
Stanley Pritchett	Zeta Epsilon	Former NFL fullback	
Dave Raimey	Sigma	Former NFL Cleveland Browns and CFL Winnipeg Blue Bombers and Toronto Argonauts. Member of the Canadian Football Hall of Fame	
Anthony Redmon	Theta Delta	Former NFL Offensive Tackle with the Arizona Cardinals, Atlanta Falcons	
Ed Reed	Grambling (LA) Alumni	Retired Baltimore Ravens All-Pro safety; Pro Football Hall of Fame, 2019	
Dwight T. Reed	Psi	Member of the 1935 and 1936 national champion Golden Gopher football teams; head football coach at Lincoln University (Missouri)	
Walter Reeves	Theta Delta	Former NFL Tight End with the Arizona Cardinals, Cleveland Browns	
Herman Riddick	Alpha Kappa	Former longtime head football coach for North Carolina Central University	
Gerald Riggs	Gamma Iota	Former NFL Atlanta Falcons and Washington Redskins running back	
C. R. Roberts	Beta Omega	Retired NFL and CFL running back	
Ron Sayers	Alpha Eta	Former San Diego Chargers running back; Younger brother of Pro Football Hall of Famer Gale Sayers	
Hurles Scales	Zeta Upsilon	Retired NFL defensive back.	
Haywood Scissum	Gamma Epsilon	Former head coach of Tuskegee University	
Linwood Sexton	Wichita (KS) Alumni	Retired pro halfback who played for the Los Angeles Dons	
Chris Scott	Indianapolis (IN) Alumni	Former NFL defensive lineman with Indianapolis Colts	
Bob Simmoms	Beta Xi (Charter member: Zeta Kappa)	Former college football coach and player. He served as the head football coach at Oklahoma State University–Stillwater from 1995 to 2000.	
Michael Sinclair	Houston (TX) Alumni	Retired NFL lineman Seattle Seahawks	
Duke Slater	Gamma	First African-American lineman in NFL history. Former AFL & NFL offensive tackle, 6x All Pro; Pro Football Hall of Fame 2020 Centennial Class; College Football Hall of Fame, 1951	
Charlie Smith	Gamma Psi	Former Philadelphia Eagles wide receiver	
Reggie Swinton	Eta Beta	Retired NFL WR and Special Teams player	
George Taliaferro	Alpha	First African American drafted by an NFL team, College Football Hall of Fame, 1981	
David Tate	Beta Theta	Former NFL Chicago Bears and Indianapolis Colts safety	
Joe Taylor	Epsilon Omicron (Charter member: Zeta Mu)	Retired football coach Howard University, Florida A&M University, Virginia Union University, and Hampton University; College Football Hall of Fame inductee	
Dennis Thomas	Gamma Pi	Inductee of the College Football Hall of Fame	
Dontarrious Thomas	Theta Delta	Former NFL linebacker with the Minnesota Vikings	
Burl Toler	Gamma Alpha	First African-American referee in the NFL; first African-American official of any professional sport when he was hired in 1965; member of the undefeated 1951 University of San Francisco football team	
Mike Tomlin	Eta Omega (Charter member: Xi Theta)	Head coach of the Pittsburgh Steelers; youngest head coach to lead his team to a Super Bowl victory in 2009; has the most wins by an African-American Head Coach in NFL history	
Jason Tucker	Kappa Epsilon	Former Edmonton Eskimos wide receiver; two-time Grey Cup Champion; current receivers coach for Saskatchewan Roughriders	
Bobby Turner	Delta Iota	Longtime NFL running back coach	
Courtney Van Buren	Gamma Sigma	Former San Diego Chargers and Detroit Lions offensive tackle	
Whitney L. Van Cleve	Gamma Epsilon	Former head football coach at Tuskegee University, Alabama State University, Hampton University and Albany State University.	
Amos Van Pelt	Delta Iota	Retired CFL running back	
Deuce Vaughn	Beta Psi	American professional football running back for the Dallas Cowboys of the National Football League (NFL)	
Carson Vinson	Gamma Phi	NFL lineman Baltimore Ravens	
Kevin Walker	Cincinnati Alumni	Former Cincinnati Bengals linebacker	
Steve Wallace	Theta Delta	Retired NFL Offensive tackle with the San Francisco 49ers	
Ted Washington Sr.	Zeta Zeta	Former NFL Houston Oilers linebacker	
Dick Westmoreland	Alpha Nu	Former San Diego Chargers cornerback	
Freeman White	Eta	Retired tight end New York Giants; Ottawa Rough Riders	
Jermaine Whitehead	Theta Delta	Former NFL Defensive Back with the Green Bay Packers, Cleveland Browns	
Aeneas Williams	Alpha Sigma	Former All Pro St. Louis Rams defensive back; Pro Football Hall of Fame, 2014	
Elijah Williams	Zeta Phi	Former NFL running back	
Bill Willis	Zeta	One of the first African-American football players to play professional football in the modern era; Pro Football Hall of Fame, 1977 and College Football Hall of Fame, 1971	
Chris Woods	Theta Delta	Former NFL WR with the Oakland Raiders	
Donovan Woods	Zeta Theta	Former NFL linebacker	
Dareke Young	Mu Upsilon	NFL WR with the Seattle Seahawks	

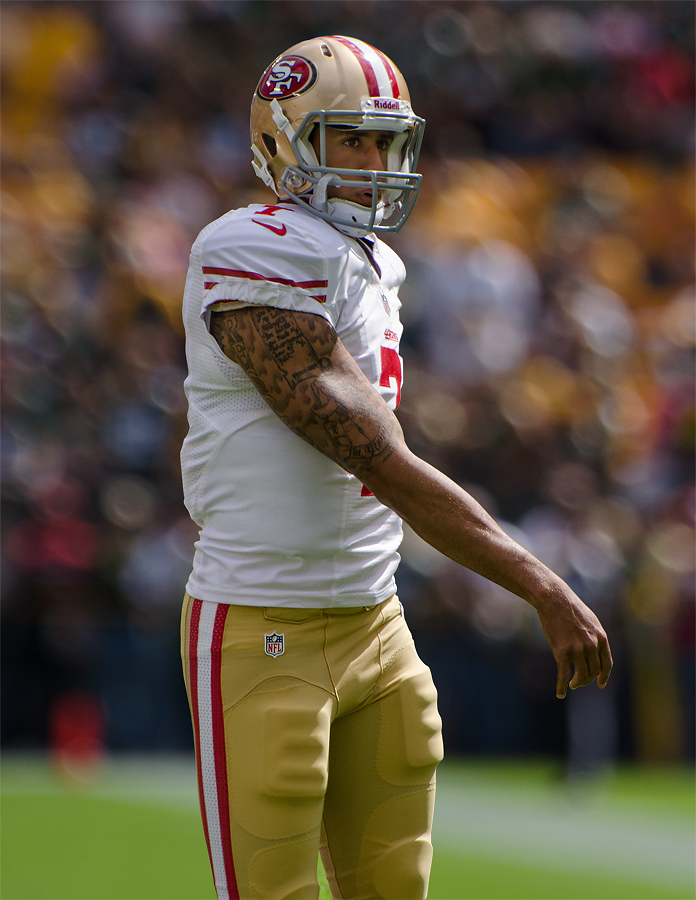
Colin Kaepernick

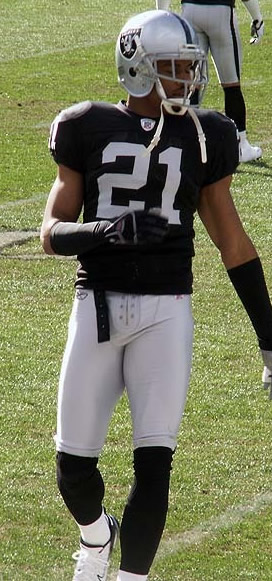
Nnamdi Asomugha

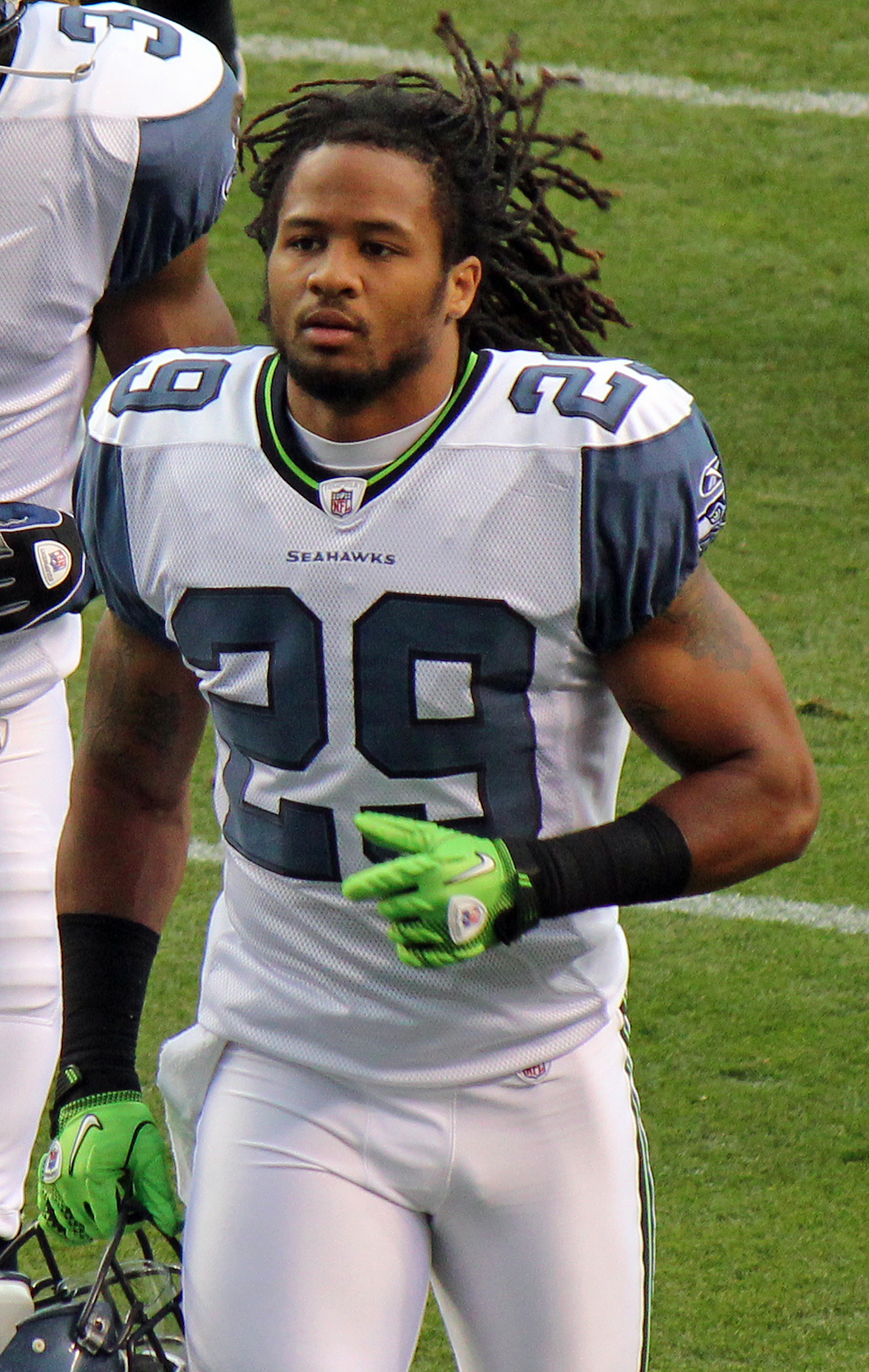
Earl Thomas

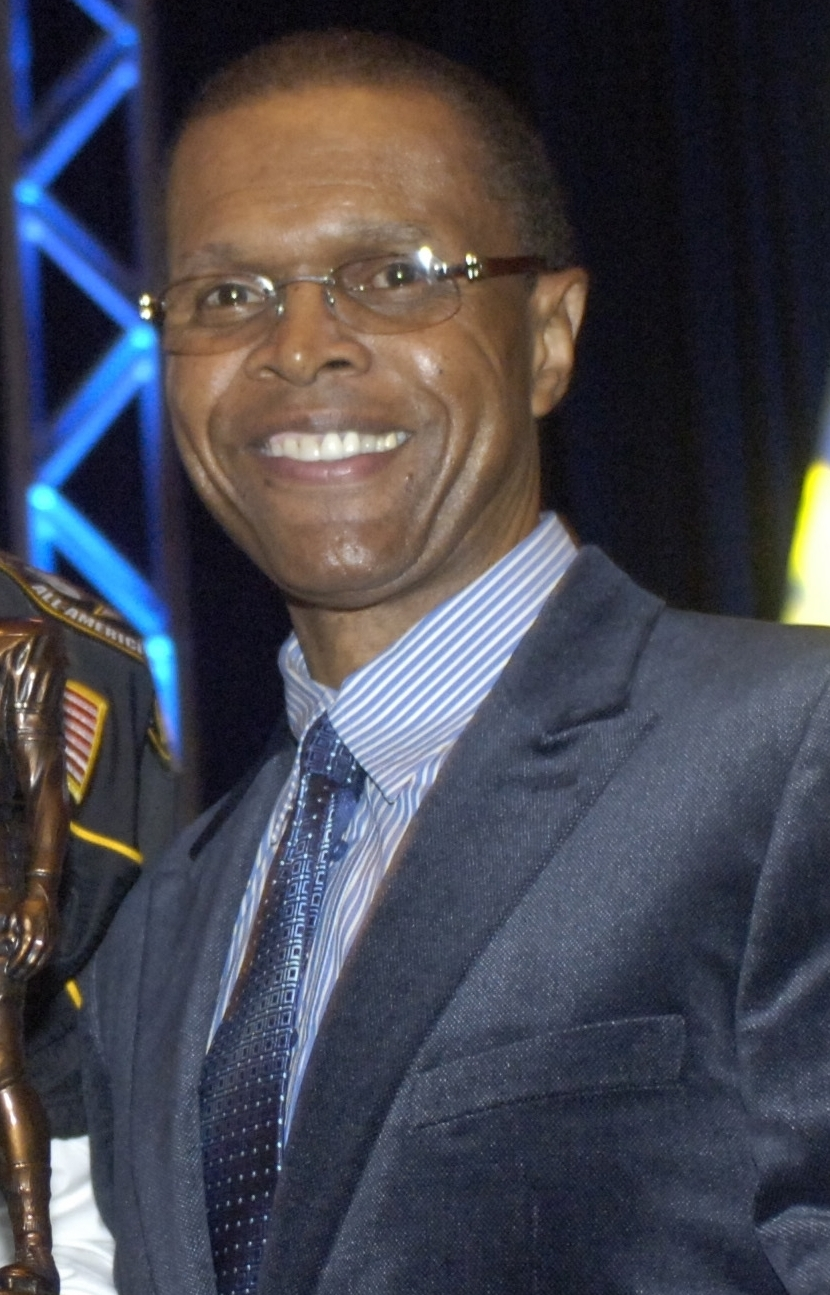
Gale Sayers

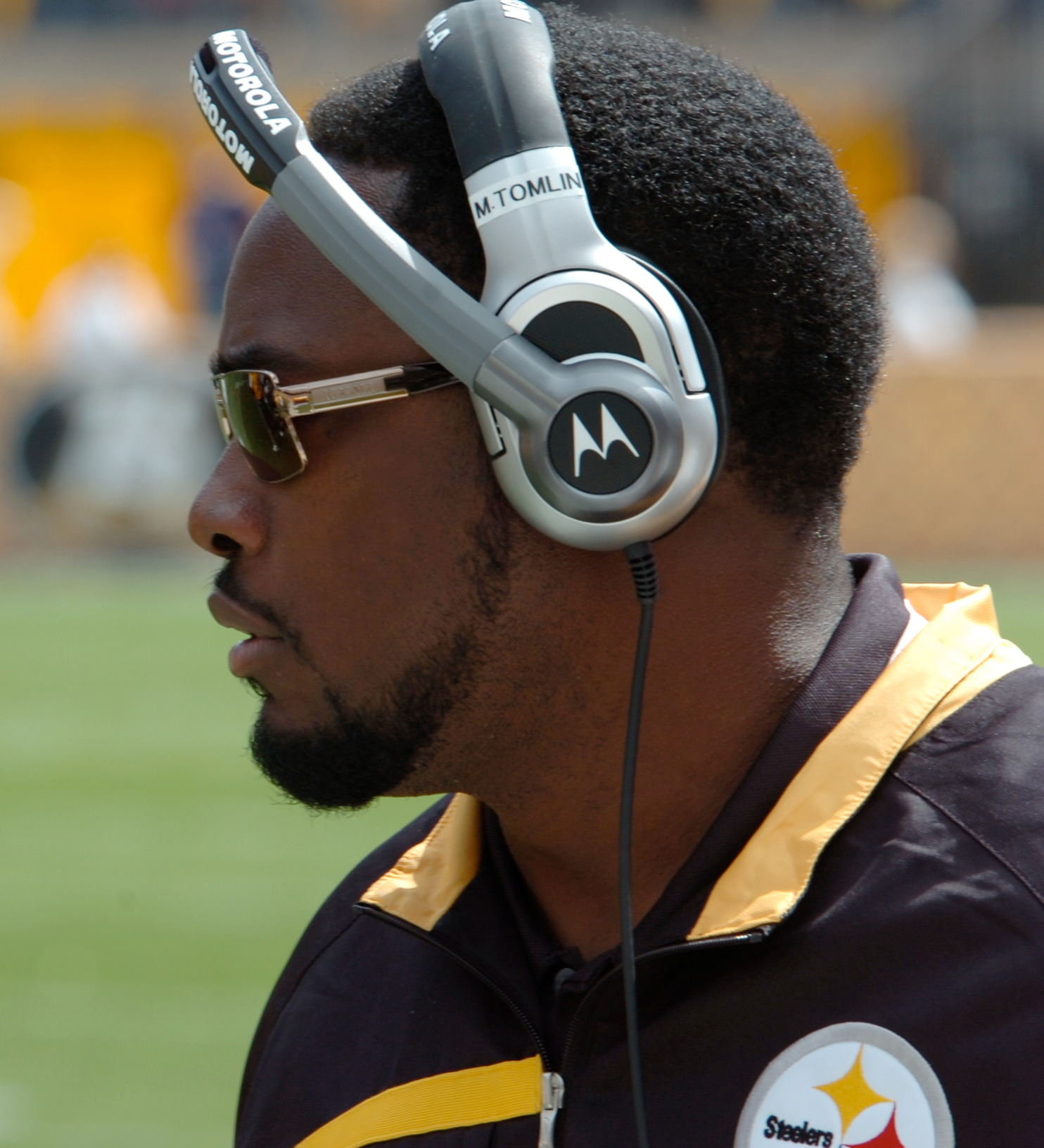
Mike Tomlin

=== Track and field ===
Name	Original chapter	Notability	Ref.
Ocky Clark	Winter Park (FL) Alumni	1991 Pan Am Games Gold Medalist 800m	
Hollis Conway	Theta Nu	1988 Olympic silver medalist and 1992 Olympic bronze medalist in the high jump	
Jon Drummond	Kappa Epsilon	2000 Olympic gold medalist in the 4X100 relay	
Sheikh Faye	Eta Gamma	Gambian high jumper and long jumper.	
Charles Greene (sprinter)	Eta	was an American track and field sprinter and winner of the gold medal in the 4 × 100 meters relay at the 1968 Summer Olympics	
Vincent Henderson	Iota Tau	Sprinter	
Byron LaBeach	Alpha Iota	Retired Jamaican sprinter who competed in the 1952 Summer Olympics	
Sean Maye	Las Vegas (NV) Alumni	1997 World Indoor Championships 4x400 gold medalist	
Erick Walder	Iota Tau	Long and triple jumper	

=== Soccer, tennis, and other athletics ===
Name	Original chapter	Notability	Ref.
Arthur Ashe	Upsilon	Tennis legend, social activist; 39th Laurel Wreath laureate;	
Kenny Bayless	Gamma Alpha	Noted championship boxing referee	
Richard Hudlin	Iota	Famed tennis coach, tennis mentor to Althea Gibson and Arthur Ashe; helped desegregate public tennis facilities in St. Louis, Missouri	
Frank Forbes	Pi	Former Morehouse College Athletic Director and basketball coach	
Cullen Jones	Charlotte (NC) Alumni	Retired competition swimmer and Olympic gold medalist who specializes in freestyle sprint events.	
William Lee	Grand Rapids (MI) Alumni	American wrestler. He competed in the men's Greco-Roman +100 kg at the 1976 Summer Olympics.	
Dasan Robinson	Iota Mu	MLS player	
Dante Washington	Theta Psi	MLS player; 1992 Olympian	
Darryl Washington	Beta Epsilon	World-class swimmer; multiple Big East Conference Champion	
