= Graves M. Allen =

American lawyer and politician

Graves M. Allen (died December 1943) was a lawyer and politician in Missouri. He served in the Missouri House of Representatives. He was elected along with fellow African Americans J. A. Davis, L. A. Knox, and W. M. Moore to serve in the House. He was first elected in 1927 or 1929.

He was born in Halls, Tennessee.
