= 1935 Morehouse Maroon Tigers football team =

American college football season

1935 Morehouse Maroon Tigers football
- Conference: Southern Intercollegiate Athletic Conference
- Record: 5–1–1 (5–1–1 SIAC)
- Head coach: Frank Forbes (3rd season)
- Home stadium: Ponce de Leon Park

1935 Southern Intercollegiate Athletic Conference football standings
	Conf.					Overall
Team	W		L		T	W		L		T
Alabama State $	6	–	0	–	1	9	–	1	–	1
Morehouse	5	–	1	–	1	5	–	1	–	1
Tuskegee	5	–	2	–	0	8	–	4	–	0
Clark (GA)	2	–	1	–	2	2	–	2	–	3
LeMoyne	3	–	2	–	0	5	–	3	–	1
Florida A&M	2	–	4	–	0	4	–	5	–	0
Morris Brown	2	–	2	–	2	3	–	4	–	2
South Carolina State	2	–	3	–	0	4	–	4	–	0
Fisk	1	–	4	–	0	1	–	4	–	1
Knoxville	0	–	5	–	1	1	–	5	–	3
Talladega	1	–	2	–	1	2	–	2	–	2
Benedict	0	–	3	–	0	1	–	5	–	2
$ – Conference champion; Standings were based on Dickinson System ratings. Benedict and Talladega were not rated because they did not play the quota of five conference games.

The 1935 Morehouse Maroon Tigers football team represented Morehouse College as a member of the Southern Intercollegiate Athletic Conference (SIAC) during the 1935 college football season. Led by third-year head coach Frank Forbes, the Maroon Tigers compiled an overall record of 5–1–1 with an identical mark in conference play, placing second in the SIAC standings, which were determined by Dickinson System ratings. The team played home games at Ponce de Leon Park in Atlanta.

== Schedule ==
Date	Time	Opponent	Site	Result	Attendance	Source
October 11	4:00 p.m.	Benedict	Ponce de Leon Park; Atlanta, GA	W 24–6		
October 19	2:00 p.m.	at Talladega	Talladega, AL	W 24–0		
October 26	2:00 p.m.	Morris Brown	Ponce de Leon Park; Atlanta, GA	W 7–6	5,000	
November 11	2:00 p.m.	Knoxville	Ponce de Leon Park; Atlanta, GA	W 33–7		
November 16	2:00 p.m.	at Clark (GA)	Clark Field; Atlanta, GA	T 7–7		
November 22	2:00 p.m.	Alabama State	Ponce de Leon Park; Atlanta, GA	L 6–14		
November 28	2:00 p.m.	at Fisk	Nashville, TN	W 7–0		
All times are in Eastern time
