= Haywood Scissum =

American football coach

Biographical details
- Born: November 19, 1924
- Died: August 28, 1995 (aged 70); Tuskegee, Alabama, U.S.

Playing career
- 1946–1949: Tuskegee
- Positions: End, tackle

Coaching career (HC unless noted)
- 1950–1969: East Highland HS (AL)
- 1970–1980: Tuskegee

Head coaching record
- Overall: 65–49–1 (college); 135–29–11 (high school)
- Bowls: 1–0

Accomplishments and honors

Championships
- 2 SIAC Division I (1970, 1974)

Haywood Scissum (November 19, 1924 – August 28, 1995) was an American football coach. He was the 11th head football coach at Tuskegee Institute—now known as Tuskegee University—in Tuskegee, Alabama, serving for 11 seasons, from 1970 to 1980, a comping a record of 65–49–1. A native of Attalla, Alabama, Scissum played college football as the end, and tackle positions in the late 1940s. Prior to his hiring at Tuskegee in 1970, he was the head football coach at East Highland High School in Sylacauga, Alabama for 20 years, amassing a record of 135–29–11.

Scissum died on August 28, 1995, in Tuskegee.

== Head coaching record ==
=== College ===
Year	Team	Overall	Conference	Standing	Bowl/playoffs
Tuskegee Golden Tigers (Southern Intercollegiate Athletic Conference) (1970–1980)
1970	Tuskegee	9–1	4–1	T–1st (Division I)	
1971	Tuskegee	5–5		(Division I)	
1972	Tuskegee	7–4		(Division I)	
1973	Tuskegee	7–4	2–3	5th (Division I)	
1974	Tuskegee	11–1	5–0	1st (Division I)	L Gate City Bowl
1975	Tuskegee	5–5	3–2	T–3rd (Division I)	
1976	Tuskegee	6–3–1	3–1–1	T–2nd (Division I)	
1977	Tuskegee	3–7	1–4	T–5th (Division I)	
1978	Tuskegee	3–7			
1979	Tuskegee	5–6			
1980	Tuskegee	4–6			
Tuskegee:		65–49–1			
Total:		65–49–1			
