= Frank Forbes (coach) =

American football and basketball coach (1904–1972)

Biographical details
- Born: February 14, 1904; Macon County, Georgia, U.S.
- Died: August 22, 1972 (aged 68)

Playing career

Football
- c. 1925: Morehouse

Coaching career (HC unless noted)

Football
- 1932–1933: Morehouse
- 1935–1942: Morehouse
- 1945–1949: Morehouse

Basketball
- 1932–1934: Morehouse
- 1935–1943: Morehouse
- 1945–1964: Morehouse

Head coaching record
- Overall: 45–57–14 (football); 298–327 (basketball)

Franklin Lafayette Forbes (February 14, 1904 – August 22, 1972) was an American college football, college baseball, and college basketball coach. He served three stints as the head football coach (1932–1933, 1935–1942, 1945–1949) at Morehouse College in Atlanta.

Forbes died on August 22, 1972. Morehouse's Forbes Arena is named after him.

== Head coaching record ==
=== Football ===
Year	Team	Overall	Conference	Standing	Bowl/playoffs
Morehouse Maroon Tigers (Southern Intercollegiate Athletic Conference) (1932–1933)
1932	Morehouse	3–4–1	2–4	8th	
1933	Morehouse	4–3–1			
Morehouse Maroon Tigers (Southern Intercollegiate Athletic Conference) (1935–1942)
1935	Morehouse	5–1–1	5–1–1	2nd	
1936	Morehouse	4–2–2	4–1–2	3rd	
1937	Morehouse	2–3–2	2–3–2	8th	
1938	Morehouse	4–3–1	4–1–1	3rd	
1939	Morehouse	4–3–1	3–2–1	6th	
1940	Morehouse	1–6–1	1–5–1	9th	
1941	Morehouse	3–5	3–4		
1942	Morehouse	3–5	1–5	T–9th	
Morehouse Maroon Tigers (Southern Intercollegiate Athletic Conference) (1945–1949)
1945	Morehouse	1–5	1–5	8th	
1946	Morehouse	1–4–3	1–4–3	11th	
1947	Morehouse	3–5	3–4		
1948	Morehouse	4–4	3–3	8th	
1949	Morehouse	3–4–1	2–4–1		
Morehouse:		45–57–14			
Total:		45–57–14			
