= Rufus Davis =

American social and political activist

Mayor of Camilla, Georgia
- In office January 21, 2016 – January 19, 2020

Personal details
- Born: March 6, 1964 (age 62) Camilla, Georgia, U.S.
- Party: Democratic
- Education: University of Michigan; Rutgers School of Law; Harvard Kennedy School EE
- Occupation: Business Executive
- Website: https://mayorrufusdavis.com

Rufus Davis (born March 6, 1964) is an American social and political activist, business executive and former Mayor of Camilla, Georgia. He was elected as the first African American male to hold the position in November 2015. Davis is a political progressive and served as the political director for Stacey Abrams during her 2018 campaign for Georgia governor. He led massive voter turnout campaigns in Georgia during the 2020 presidential election, the 2020–21 U.S. Senate election, and Georgia's 2021 U.S. Senate special election.

Davis is known for boycotting his own city council to protest segregation, racism, and alleged financial irregularities. In December 2017, national civil rights attorney Benjamin Crump represented Rufus Davis and a newly-elected city councilman, Venterra Pollard, in demanding that the city of Camilla remove a 4-foot fence in the city-owned cemetery that separated Blacks and Whites.

== Education ==
Davis received his bachelor's degree from the University of Michigan and Juris Doctor from Rutgers Law. During his undergraduate and graduate years he studied at the University of Economics in Prague, Czech Republic and Leiden University Faculty of Law in the Netherlands. Davis also holds an Executive Education Certificate from the John F. Kennedy School of Government at Harvard University for Senior Leaders in State and Local Government.

== The Camilla Movement ==
In January 2018 Rufus Davis announced that he had started the Camilla (Georgia) Movement to bring needed social, economic and political reform to the city of Camilla. He described the movement as the first franchise of a wider Social Project that would also serve other communities faced with challenges related to inclusion, diversity and access to opportunities.

== Camilla, Georgia controversy ==
After being elected Mayor of the City of Camilla, a White City Manager, Bennett, refused to give Mayor Davis Keys to City Hall. In a 6-0, unanimous vote, the city council agreed with Bennett to deny Davis's request for keys.

On December 4, 2017, Davis and newly elected councilman, Venterra Pollard, announced that they would be boycotting city council meetings. This decision was sparked by a recommendation by the city manager, at that time, that the city adopt a new charter. The new city charter would delegate authority to the city manager to appoint all council committees, commissions, boards, and the city attorney.

Davis alleged that although the City of Camilla was 70% Black, the city-owned cemetery was segregated, with Black and White sections separated by a fence.

There were no Black police officers

Only three blacks worked in city hall in jobs clerical or higher

Almost all Blacks that applied to jobs inside city hall were rejected.

99% of White students attended the historically all-white private school

99% of all Black students attended the under-funded public school

The city was hyperly-gerrymandered.

The alleged statistics drew national and international attention and tremendous public support. And on January 6, 2017 amid a legal threat made by attorney, Benjamin Crump the city of Camilla dismantled the fence in the city-owned Oakview cemetery. Davis called this the first of several fences that needed to be removed, referring to metaphorical fences in the police department, city hall, job opportunities and city government.

One of the biggest allegations made regarding the city-owned cemetery involved a Black man who passed for White. After being buried on the White side of the cemetery, his body had to be exhumed and reburied on the Black side of the cemetery.

== The Racial Recall ==
In March 2017, White residents of Camilla, Georgia, angered over unflattering national media attention based on Davis' allegations of racism, began an unsuccessful campaign to recall him from office. The recall failed after the petitioners could not obtain the number of necessary signatures, as required by Georgia Law. Over 90% of those who signed the recall petition against Davis were White residents. Hence the recall campaign was dubbed as the Racial Recall. Ironically, the recall effort was led by an elderly African-American woman, Vivian Smith. Smith had been recently voted off the Camilla city council a few months earlier, losing to Venterra Pollard, a candidate endorsed by Davis. Pollard would later join Mayor Davis in boycotting city council meetings.

In 2016, the previous year, Camilla residents in support of Mayor Davis launched a recall of four members of the Camilla city council, Vivian Smith, Bryant Campbell, W.D Palmer and Annie Doris Willingham. The recall was based on complaints that the city council was not responsive to the concerns of the citizens. Tensions among citizens erupted after council members refused to attend a special call meeting by the mayor. The meeting was called after the White city manager, Bennett Adams, refused to provide Davis keys to city hall, claiming that no mayor before Davis had ever had keys to city hall.

Prior to becoming elected Mayor, Davis lead a citizens group called "We the people v. City Hall." The group opposed high utility rates and lack of fair representation from both Black and White city officials.
