= James A. Dallas =

James Albert "Jimmie" Dallas Sr.
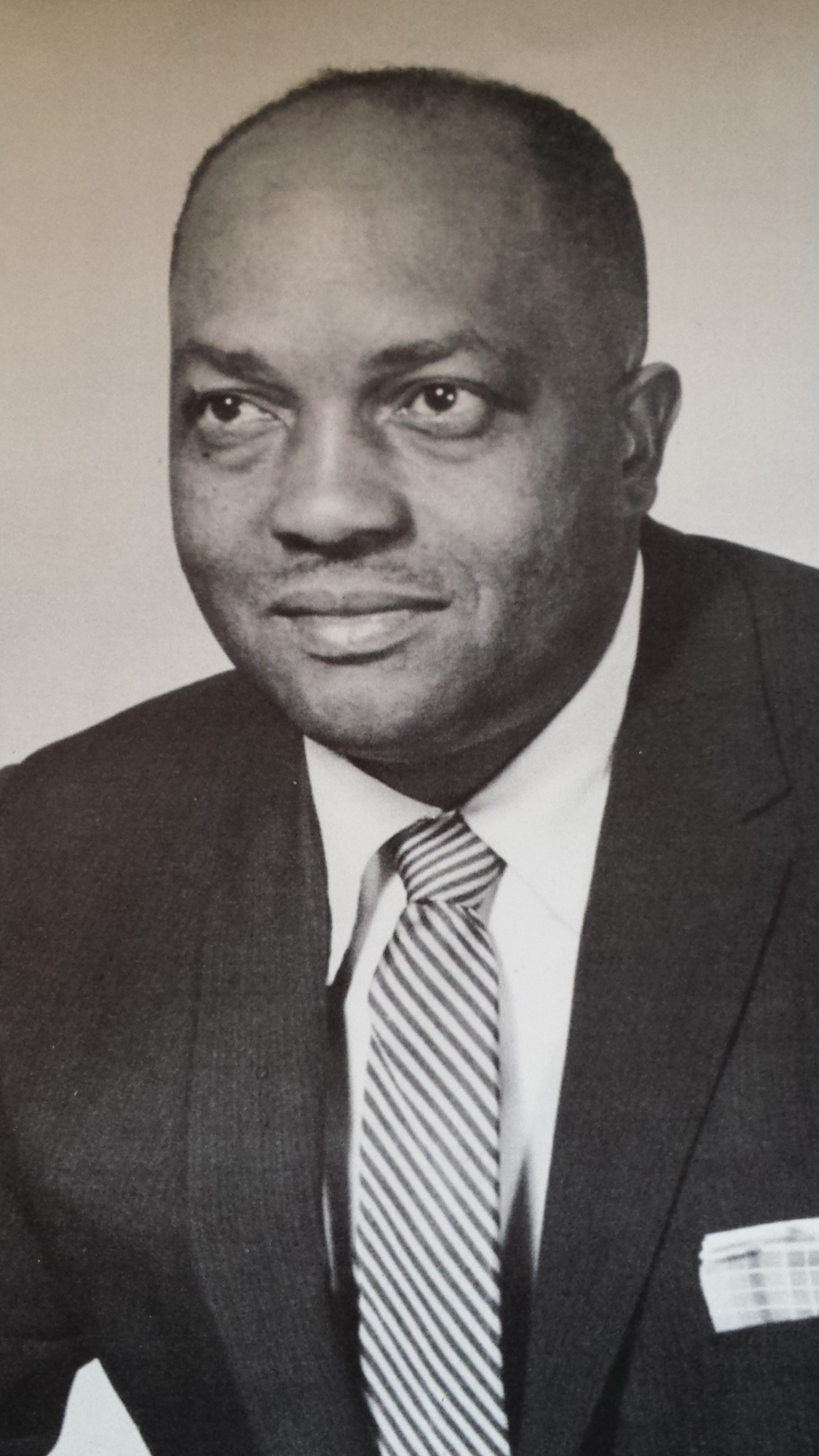
- Born: December 19, 1917; Monticello, Florida, United States
- Died: April 9, 2004 (aged 86); Fort Lauderdale, Florida, United States
- Other name: Jimmie Dallas
- Education: Florida A&M University; Howard University
- Occupations: Educator; Entrepreneur
- Known for: Musical patronage; Political activism; Leader in segregated Fort Lauderdale
- Spouse: Margie Sweet Dallas

James A. Dallas Sr. (December 19, 1917 – April 9, 2004) was an American educator, entrepreneur, musical patron and civic leader from Fort Lauderdale, Florida. He was the first African-American man to have a street in downtown Fort Lauderdale named in his honor.

== Early life and education ==
James Albert Dallas was born in Monticello, Florida, on December 19, 1917, to Albert and Florida Dallas. His parents died before he was 12 years old.

He graduated from Florida A&M University in 1942, where he played trombone in the university's marching, concert and jazz bands. Dallas entered Howard University's pharmacy program later that year. He was drafted into the United States Army ten days after his admittance into Howard University. He was a member of the Kappa Alpha Psi fraternity.

== Military service ==
He was assigned to Pacific Ocean Operations, and served as First Sergeant of the 24th Infantry Division in Okinawa, Japan. He served a total of four years from 1942 to 1946.

== Career ==
=== Teaching ===
Dallas began teaching at Dorsey High School in Miami, Florida, following his separation from the Army. He taught English and public speaking. Dallas retired from teaching in 1982 after 36 years teaching in Miami Dade County and Broward County.

=== Entrepreneurship ===
Dallas's business ventures included two nightclubs: O'Dell's Lounge and Grill and The Big Savoy, which served black and white patrons in segregated Fort Lauderdale. Musicians who played at Dallas' clubs include Duke Ellington, Count Basie, Charlie Brantly, Ella Fitzgerald, Dinah Washington, Ray Charles, and Lionel Hampton. The Dillard Historical Museum has recognized Dallas for his contributions to Fort Lauderdale culture and entertainment.

His entrepreneurial activities also included owned a grocery store and pest control business.

=== Civic leadership ===
Dallas was a charter member and former leader of the Fort Lauderdale Alumni chapter of Kappa Alpha Psi and founding member of the Young Men's Progressive Association. He served as leader of the Pride of Fort Lauderdale chapter of the Elks Lodge. He was also active in the NAACP.

Dallas is also credited with recruiting some to Fort Lauderdale some of the city's most notable African-American leaders, including the first black doctor to serve at Broward General Medical Center, Dr. Calvin H. Shirley, and the city's first black attorney, T.J. Reddick. Dallas also served as an adviser to congressman and former federal judge Alcee Hastings.

The Fort Lauderdale City Commissioners unanimously voted to dedicate a portion of 2nd Street in Fort Lauderdale as the "James A Dallas Sr. Street" in honor of Dallas in December 2004. James A. Dallas Sr. Street was the first street in downtown Fort Lauderdale named in honor of an African-American man. The Mayor of Fort Lauderdale also proclaimed December 4, 2004, James A. Dallas Day.

== Personal life ==
Dallas married educator Margie Sweet Dallas in 1950. They remained married until her death in 1987. The couple's three children are attorney Ronald K. Dallas, James A. Dallas ll, P.T. and Michele A. Dallas, DDS.
