= L. Amasa Knox =

American lawyer, politician (1869–1949)

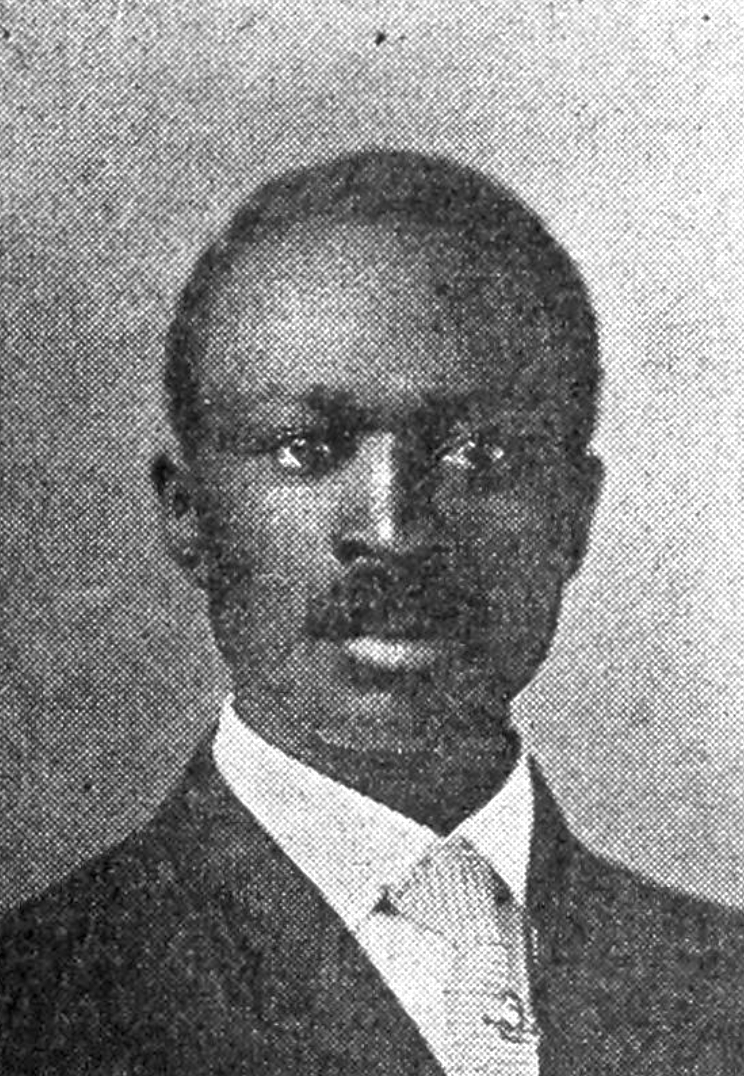
L. Amasa Knox, c. 1913

L. Amasa Knox (1869 – August 10, 1949) was an American lawyer, civil rights activist, and state legislator in Missouri. He served in the Missouri House of Representatives in the late 1920s. He lived in Kansas City, Missouri where he worked as a lawyer, and also held leadership positions in the NAACP Kansas City office.

== Biography ==
L. Amasa Knox was born in 1869 in Virginia. As a child he attended the First Baptist Church of Sussex, Virginia. He supported himself in his early career as a blacksmith.

Knox graduated from Virginia Normal and Collegiate Institute (now Virginia State University), initially with the college preparatory coursework in 1890, followed by a A.B. degree in 1894. He graduated from law school in 1897 from Howard University School of Law.

In 1919, he represented two boys who fled peonage in Arkansas and were facing extradition back to Arkansas for monies allegedly owed.

Knox served as president of Kansas City's NAACP branch, and was elected along with fellow African Americans Walthour Moore and G. M. Allen in 1927.

== See also ==
- List of African-American officeholders (1900–1959)
