= Strivers' Section Historic District =

Historic district in Washington, D.C., United States

- U.S. National Register of Historic Places
- U.S. Historic district
- D.C. Inventory of Historic Sites
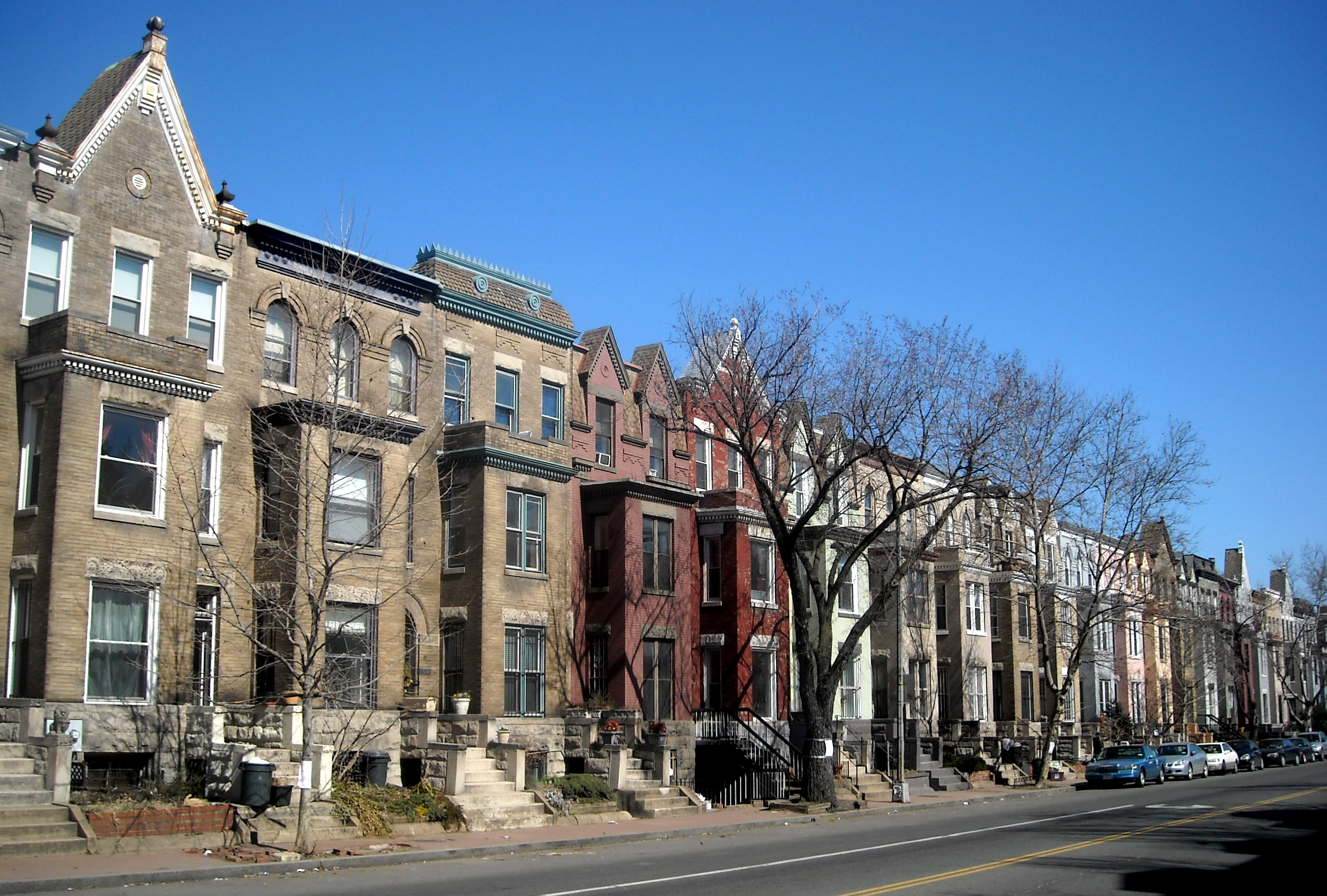
- Rowhouses on the 1700 block of U Street NW

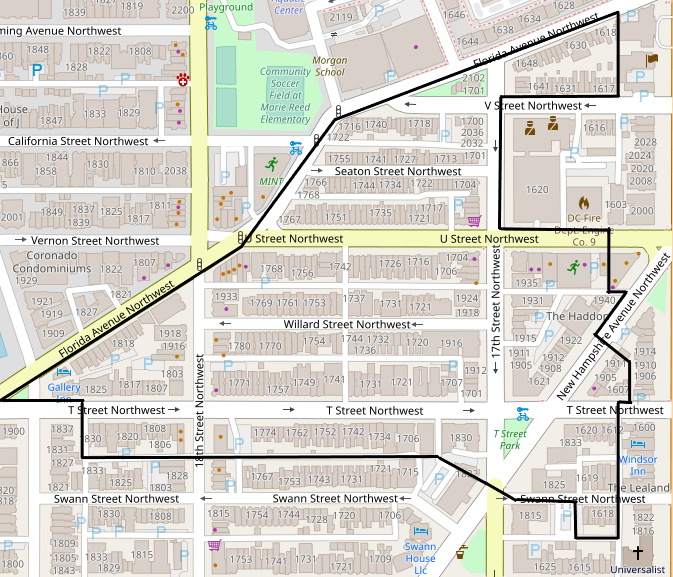
- Location: Washington, D.C.
- Coordinates: 38°55′0″N 77°2′26″W
- Built: 1875–1925
- Architectural style: Beaux-Arts, Italianate, Queen Anne, Romanesque Revival, Second Empire, Tudor Revival
- NRHP reference No.: 85000239

Significant dates
- Added to NRHP: February 6, 1985
- Designated DCIHS: June 30, 1983

The Strivers' Section Historic District is a historic district located in the Dupont Circle neighborhood of Washington, D.C. Strivers' Section was historically an enclave of upper-middle-class African Americans, often community leaders, in the late 19th and early 20th centuries. It takes its name from a turn-of-the-20th-century writer who described the district as "the Striver's section, a community of Negro aristocracy." The name echoes that of Strivers' Row in Harlem, a New York City historic neighborhood of black professionals. The district is roughly bounded by Swann Street and the Dupont Circle Historic District on the south, Florida Avenue and the Washington Heights Historic District on the north and west, and the Sixteenth Street Historic District on the east.

The historic district is mostly composed of apartment buildings and rowhouses. Notable inhabitants have included Frederick Douglass, Lewis Henry Douglass, and Calvin Brent. Architectural styles represented in Strivers' Section include Italianate, Queen Anne, Romanesque Revival, and Second Empire. Architects and real estate developers whose works are in the district include George S. Cooper, Thomas Franklin Schneider, B. Stanley Simmons, Harry Wardman, and Frank Russell White. The historic district, which includes around 430 contributing properties, was added to the District of Columbia Inventory of Historic Sites in 1983 and listed on the National Register of Historic Places in 1985.

== Geography ==
The Strivers' Section Historic District is in the north end of Dupont Circle, a historic district and neighborhood in the northwest quadrant of Washington, D.C. The boundaries of the historic district are roughly Swann Street and the Dupont Circle Historic District on the south, Florida Avenue and the Washington Heights Historic District on the north and west, and the Sixteenth Street Historic District on the east. In addition to Florida Avenue, major roads that pass through the district are 17th Street, 18th Street, New Hampshire Avenue, and U Street.

There are about 430 contributing properties in the historic district, built between 1875 and 1946. Around 50 buildings, including the DC Police's Third District headquarters, are non-contributing. Contributing properties in the district include Old Engine Company No. 9 and these apartment buildings: The Albemarle, The Belgrade, The Kirkman, The Livingston, The Melwood, The Saint Clair, The Vernon, Willard Courts, The Wilton, and The Windermere-Harrowgate.

== History ==
=== 19th century ===
The present-day historic district was envisioned as part of the capital city by Pierre Charles L'Enfant's 1791 plan, but the area remained rural and undeveloped for several decades. Holmead's Burying Ground was established in 1794 and for almost 100 years operated as a public cemetery on the southwestern border of today's Strivers' Section. The bodies were later reinterned at other cemeteries in the city. Widow's Mite, later known as Oak Lawn, was an estate located on the western edge of the district on the site of the present-day Washington Hilton.

By 1852, plans were drawn up for 11 squares subdivided by streets and alleys, but the rural landscape remained largely uninhabited except for scattered frame houses and shanties occupied by working-class people. The first sign of development in the district's vicinity was the construction of military camps during the Civil War. One of these camps, Camp Barker, was located near 14th and U Streets. It served as a haven for African Americans during the war and along with two other camps, developed into neighborhoods for the city's African American residents.

During the Civil War the Washington and Georgetown Company's horse-drawn streetcar line opened along 14th Street and spurred development in the area. Seeing the potential for real estate in close proximity to the streetcar line, developers purchased parcels of land in the area which at the time was owned by one person. One of these developers was Henry A. Willard who founded the Willard Hotel. A street named after him runs through the center of the historic district.

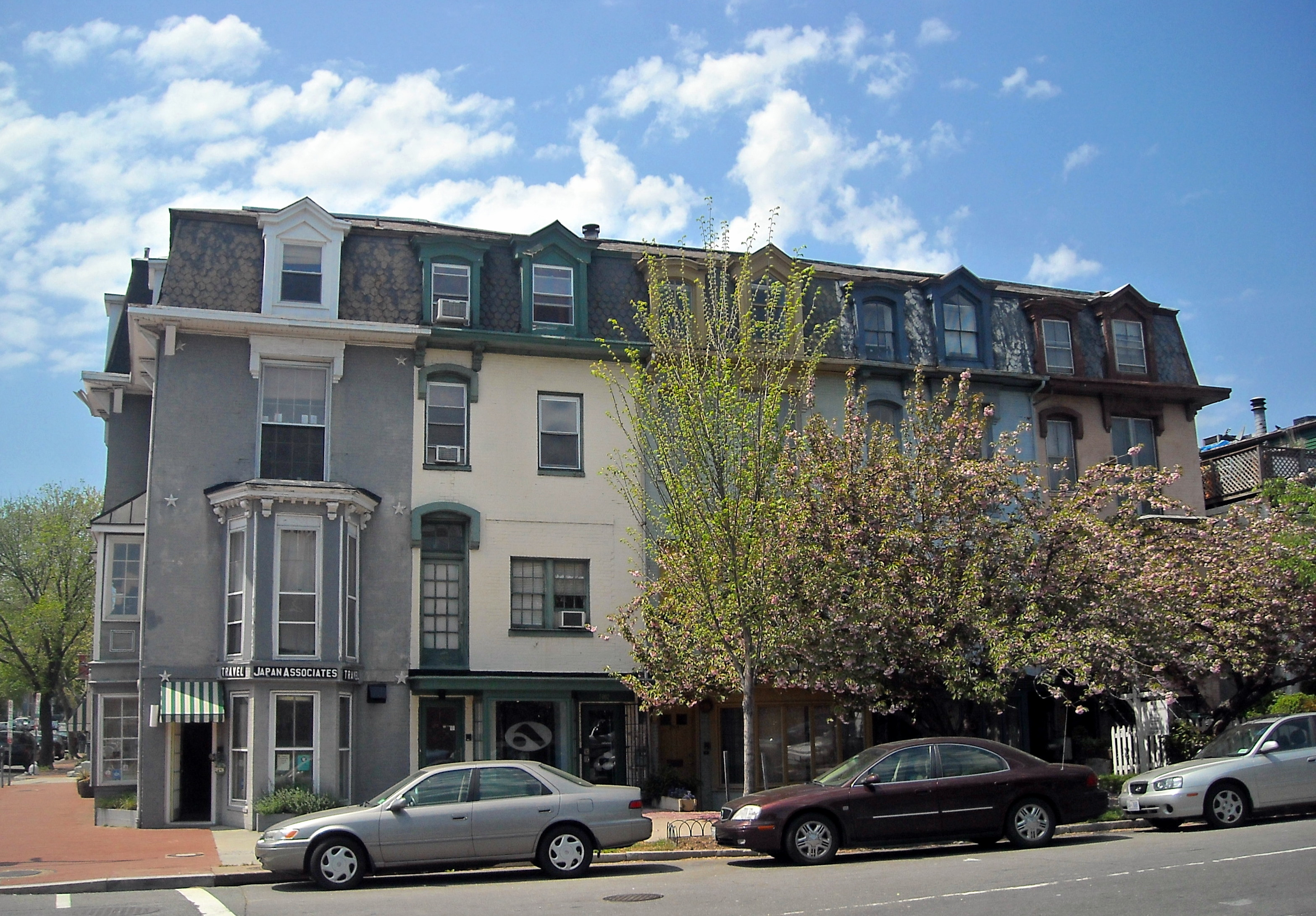
Frederick Douglass owned three of the buildings at 17th and U Streets NW.

In the early 1870s, Alexander "Boss" Shepherd, then head of the city's Board of Public Works, led a massive improvement in the city's street layout, including in the Strivers' Section. More than 150 houses were built in the area between 1873 and 1875, transforming a rural part of the city to an active residential neighborhood. These original buildings, some of which were later demolished, included simple frame dwellings and larger, more elaborate homes. Surviving examples include Italianate buildings on 17th Street, Seaton Street, and T Street.

Early residents included working-class people and professionals, African Americans and whites, but the area became most strongly identified with the African American middle class and elites who were attracted by public transit and nearby Howard University. One of these early residents was writer and statesman Frederick Douglass, who purchased three Second Empire-style homes on the corner of 17th and U Streets in 1877 as a real estate investment. Douglass's son Lewis lived at 2002 17th Street NW for more than 30 years. James E. Storum, who founded the Capital Savings Bank, lived next door. The earnings Frederick Douglass received from these real estate ventures, along with his writings and speaking engagements, ensured his financial security during retirement at Cedar Hill.

More development was spurred by the 1893 arrival of the Rock Creek Railway Company's electric streetcar service along U Street. The following two decades saw the construction of more than half of the historic district's buildings, including the prominent Old Engine Company No. 9 and rows of mostly Queen Anne-style houses. The neighborhood demographics also began a gradual shift from almost exclusively African American to a mixture that included middle-class whites. Although they lived in close proximity, both races generally lived on specific streets in the neighborhood and rarely socialized with each other .

=== 20th century ===
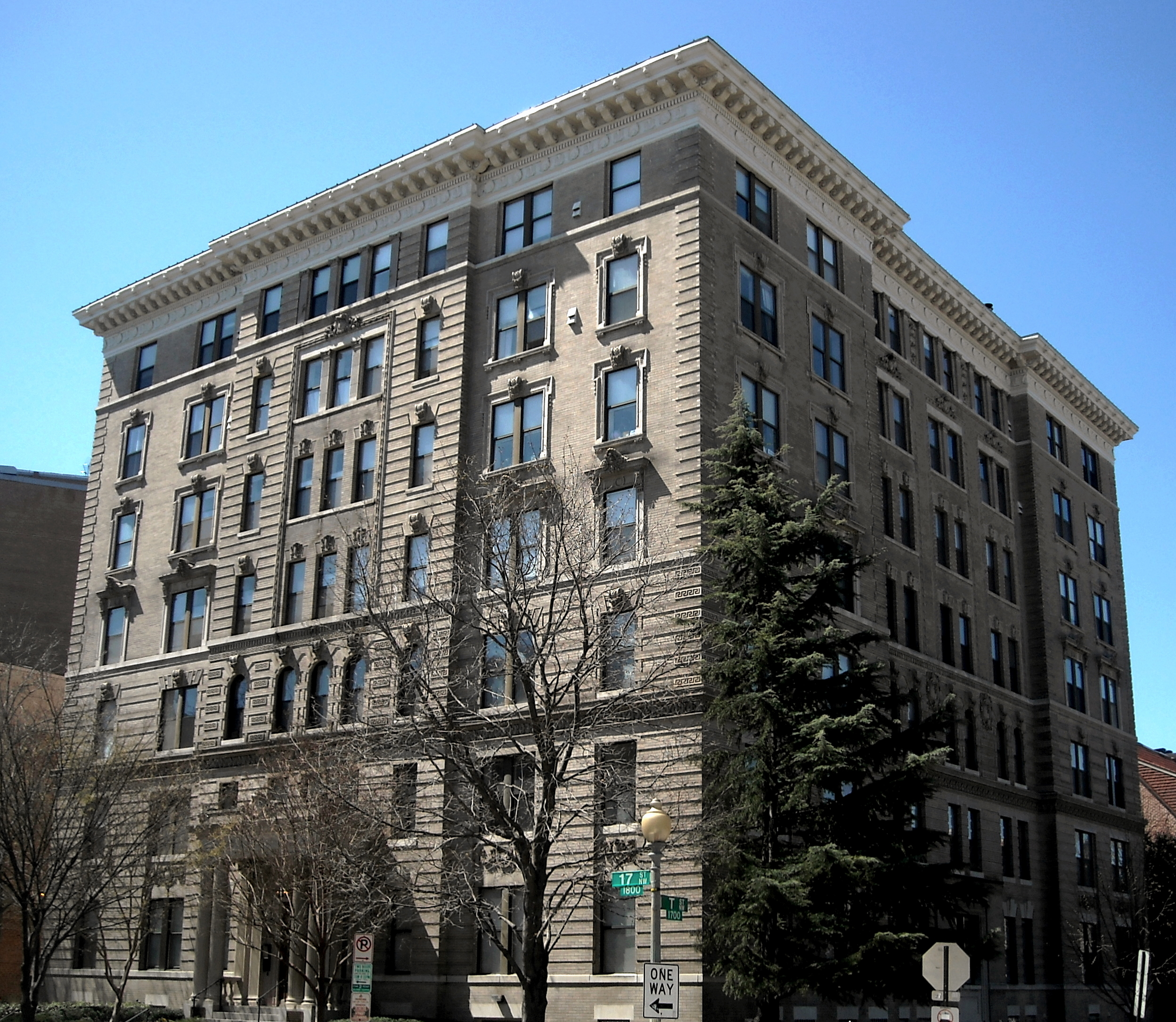
The Albemarle was built in 1900 and designed by Thomas Franklin Schneider.

Most of the residential buildings constructed in the early 1900s were larger and catered to the middle class. Inhabitants included the city's Recorder of Deeds James C. Dancy and Howard University faculty member Joseph Lealand Johnson, the second African American to earn both a Ph.D. and an M.D. Architect Calvin Brent, who lived at 1700 V Street NW, is best known for his St. Luke's Episcopal Church, but he also designed the house next door, 1704 V Street NW. The row of Romanesque Revival houses along the north side of the 1700 block of U Street were built in 1902 and designed by architect Nicholas T. Haller, one of several prominent local architects whose designs are represented in the historic district. George S. Cooper, Albert H. Beers, William C. Allard, Thomas M. Haislip, Nicholas D. Grimm, and Louis D. Meline are some of the architects who designed houses along Florida Avenue, 17th Street, T Street, U Street, V Street, and Willard Street.

The residential buildings constructed during this period also included apartments, several of which are small and resemble rowhouses, and medium-sized buildings including: The Saint Clair at 1717 T Street NW, designed by Cooper in 1903, The Wilton at 1931 17th Street NW, designed by Beers in 1908, and The Livingston at 1741-43 T Street NW, designed by Hunter & Bell in 1917. The large apartment buildings were constructed on more prominent lots. Examples include: The Albemarle at 1830 17th Street NW, designed by Thomas Franklin Schneider in 1900, The Melwood and The Vernon at 1768 and 1774 U Street NW, designed by B. Stanley Simmons in 1906, The Belgrade and The Kirkman at 1918 and 1930 18th Street NW, designed by Beers and built by Harry Wardman in 1908, and Willard Courts, designed by Frank Russell White and built by Wardman in 1915.

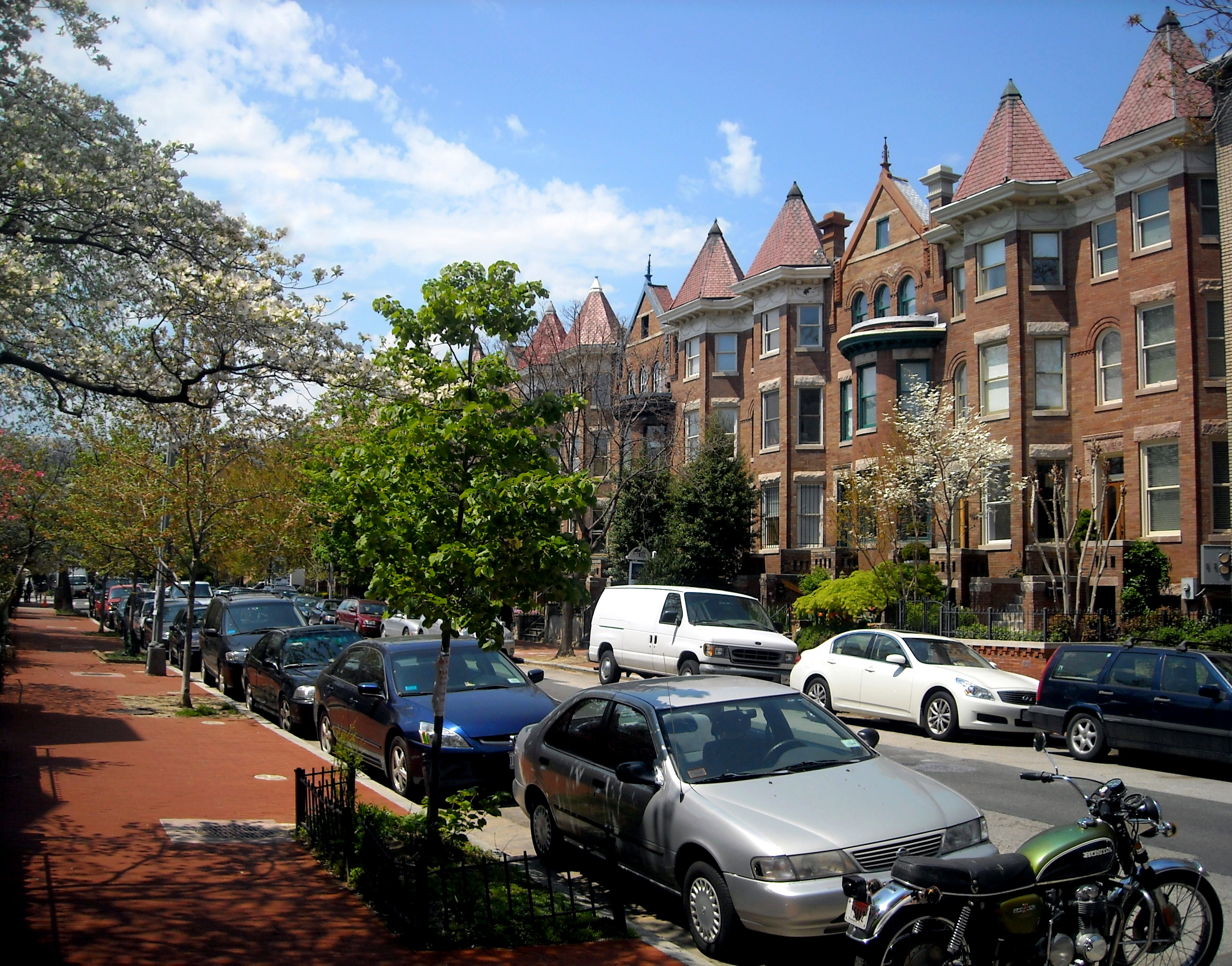
The 1700 block of T Street NW, in the Strivers' Section

There were a few large apartment buildings constructed during the 1920s including The New Williamsburg at 1621 T Street NW, designed by Stern & Tomlinson in 1925 in the Classical Revival style, and The Windermere-Harrowgate at 1825 and 1833 New Hampshire Avenue NW, also designed by Stern and Tomlinson in 1925 in the Tudor Revival style. Commercial properties built during this period include 1610 U Street NW, constructed in 1921 for American Motor Schools and designed by Appleton P. Clark Jr.

By the 1920s, U Street between 7th and 17th Streets featured numerous African American businesses and entertainment venues while Dupont Circle remained an almost exclusively white neighborhood. The demographics of the Strivers' Section once again changed during this decade, from a mixed-race community to a mostly middle-class African American one. It was during this decade when the area earned its nickname. Strivers' Section was originally a derisive term that described neighborhoods where African Americans had purchased homes from white residents. These people were supposedly "striving to get beyond members of their own race." But the term Strivers' Section was reclaimed as a positive description by people including social historian William Henry Jones, who praised "negro pioneers" that didn't limit themselves to segregated areas of the city.

White residents on the neighborhood's southern border created a racially restrictive covenant that blocked African Americans and Jews from living on their streets. This was challenged in courts, but the covenants were ruled legal. Many of the African Americans who continued to live in Strivers' Section during this period were prominent members of their community, but in certain areas such as Seaton Street, poor residents struggled. Gordon Parks photographed Seaton Street and its residents to demonstrate the effects poverty and racism had on the community.

After racial covenants were ruled unconstitutional in the 1948 Supreme Court case Shelley v. Kraemer, African American residents of Strivers' Section were no longer limited to which neighborhoods they could live in and began to move to other areas of the city. During the next decades poverty and crime became a serious issue in Strivers' Section, made worse by the devastation following the 1968 riots. Although some historic buildings were demolished in the following decades, including ones on U Street that were replaced with the DC Police's Third District headquarters in 1974, most of the urban renewal plans that would have dramatically changed the neighborhood's appearance did not take place.

In the early 1980s, four Dupont Circle neighborhood organizations sought to expand the Dupont Circle Historic District's boundaries to include Strivers' Section, but the Joint Committee on Landmarks chose to designate the latter as its own historic district. The Strivers' Section Historic District was added to the District of Columbia Inventory of Historic Sites on June 30, 1983, and listed on the National Register of Historic Places on February 6, 1985.

Prominent African Americans who lived just beyond the historic district's boundaries included poets Langston Hughes and Georgia Douglas Johnson, educator Lucy Diggs Slowe, military officer Benjamin O. Davis Sr., opera singer Todd Duncan, attorney Charles Hamilton Houston, civil rights activist Dutton Ferguson who challenged segregation on U Street, and ophthalmologist Arthur Curtis and his wife Helen who were the subjects of the Corrigan v. Buckley Supreme Court case that involved racially restrictive covenants.

Since the designation of the historic district, the restoration of buildings in the district and the development spurred by the opening of Metro's U Street station has led to a diverse population residing in Strivers' Section.

== See also ==
- African-American neighborhood
- List of African-American historic places in the District of Columbia
- National Register of Historic Places listings in Washington, D.C.
