= Theophilus John McKee =

American attorney

- Born: September 29, 1879
- Died: August 4, 1948 (aged 68)

Theophilus John McKee (September 29, 1879 — August 4, 1948) was an African-American attorney in the prominent Syphax family. He lived most of his life as a Euro-American, but revealed his African ancestry late in life to obtain an inheritance.

== Biography ==
He was born Theophilus John Syphax to Douglas Syphax and Abbie (McKee) Syphax in Philadelphia, Pennsylvania. His maternal grandfather was Colonel John McKee, an African-American property speculator and Civil War veteran. Syphax was of mixed-race and light-skinned. At the age of 22, in 1902, he decided to pass as white in order to evade Jim Crow constraints. He disassociated himself from his family.

In June 1904, Theophilus John Syphax legally changed his name to T. John McKee and began living within Euro-American society. He became friends with influential people, including lawyers and judges. In 1905 he applied for and was accepted to Columbia University's law school. McKee worked as a commercial attorney on Wall Street for the next 40 years.

He married Anna Lois Dixon, a Euro-American woman from upstate New York. They settled in New York City and had two sons: T. John McKee, Jr. in 1910, and Douglas Dixon McKee in 1911. They attended Yale and Trinity College, respectively.

McKee hid his African-American ancestry from his wife and children. After his marriage to Anna Dixon ended in divorce, McKee married another Euro-American woman. He continued to conceal his African-American ancestry. McKee and his wife lived on Manhattan's East Side. After his sons finished college, they resettled in upstate New York near their mother.

McKee had to reveal his secret when he tried to claim an inheritance. In 1946, McKee's first cousin, Henry McKee Minton, died. McKee was the last surviving grandchild of the Syphax-McKee family from Philadelphia.

It was subsequently reported in a New York Post article on March 25, 1948, that, although McKee had been accepted as a Euro-American man for 45 years, he was the African-American grandson of Civil War veteran Col. John McKee. Syphax/McKee died of heart failure on August 4, 1948.
