= Alexander Crummell =

American minister and academic (1819–1898)

The Reverend Alexander Crummell
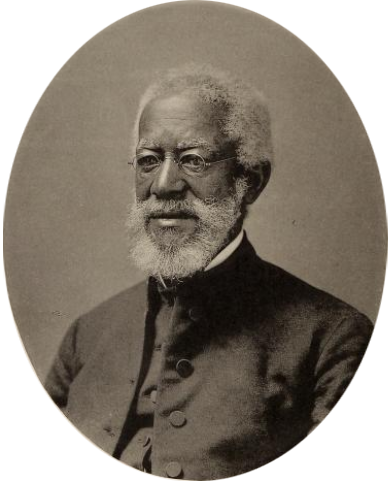
- Born: March 3, 1819; New York City, New York, U.S.
- Died: September 10, 1898 (aged 79); Red Bank, New Jersey, U.S.
- Education: Noyes Academy; Oneida Institute; Queens' College, Cambridge
- Occupations: Abolitionist, activist, author, minister, professor

Religious life
- Religion: Episcopal

Alexander Crummell (March 3, 1819 – September 10, 1898) was a minister, author, abolitionist, and academic. Born to free black parents in New York City, Crummell attended various educational institutions and was ordained as an Episcopal priest in the United States. He was a member of Prince Hall Freemasonry.

Crummell went to England in the late 1840s, where he raised money by lecturing about American slavery, and studied for three years at Cambridge University. In the early 1850s, Crummell moved to Liberia, where he worked to convert Africans to Christianity and educate them, as well as to persuade African-American colonists of his ideas. Crummell lived and worked in Liberia for 20 years but did not gather wide support for his ideas.

After returning to the United States in 1872, Crummell was called to St. Mary's Episcopal Mission in Washington, DC. In 1875, he and his congregation founded St. Luke's Episcopal Church, the first independent Black Episcopal church in Washington, DC. Crummell served as rector there until his retirement in 1894.

Crummell is best known for developing the concept of Pan-Africanism and for his writings on race relations in America and on the Black American colonization of Liberia.

== Early life and education ==
Crummell was born in 1819 in New York City to Charity Hicks, a free woman of color, and Boston Crummell, a former enslaved man. According to Crummell's account, his paternal grandfather was an ethnic Temne, born in what is now Sierra Leone; he was captured and sold into slavery when he was around 13 years old. Both of Crummell's parents were active abolitionists. Their home was used to publish the first African-American newspaper, Freedom's Journal. Boston Crummell instilled in his son a sense of unity with Africans living in Africa. His parents' influence and these early experiences in the abolitionist movement shaped Crummell's values, beliefs, and actions throughout his life. Even as a boy in New York, Crummell worked for the American Anti-Slavery Society.

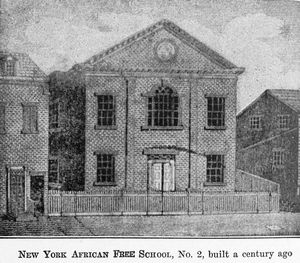
Lithograph of African Free School which Crummell attended

After overhearing the conversation of a group of lawyers, where one quoted U.S. Senator John C. Calhoun by stating that "if he could find a Negro, who knew the Greek syntax, he would then believe that the Negro was a human being and should be treated as a man," Crummell determined to start his education. Crummell began his formal education at home with private tutors and at the African Free School No. 2. Other African-American men who became active in the abolitionist movement, such as James McCune Smith (a pioneering doctor) and Henry Highland Garnet (a minister and abolitionist), also graduated from the African Free School. Crummell attended the Canal Street High School. After graduating, Crummell and his friend Garnet attended the new Noyes Academy in New Hampshire. However, a mob opposed to Blacks attacked and destroyed the school. Crummell next enrolled in the Oneida Institute in central New York, a center of abolitionism. While there, Crummell decided to become an Episcopal priest. His prominence as a young intellectual earned him a spot as keynote speaker at the anti-slavery New York State Convention of Negroes when it met in Albany in 1840.

Denied admission to the General Theological Seminary in New York City because of his race, Crummell went on to study at Yale University from 1840 to 1841. In 1842, he received Episcopal holy orders and was ordained in Massachusetts. However, "he soon found that there was little scope for Black priests." As he struggled against ambivalence and low church attendance in his church in Providence, Rhode Island, Crummell traveled to Philadelphia to petition the area bishop for a larger congregation. Philadelphia had a large free Black community. Bishop Onderdonk replied, "I will receive you into this diocese on one condition: No negro priest can sit in my church convention and no negro church must ask for representation there." Crummell is said to have paused for a moment and then said, "I will never enter your diocese on such terms."

== Career ==
=== Studies and lectures in England ===
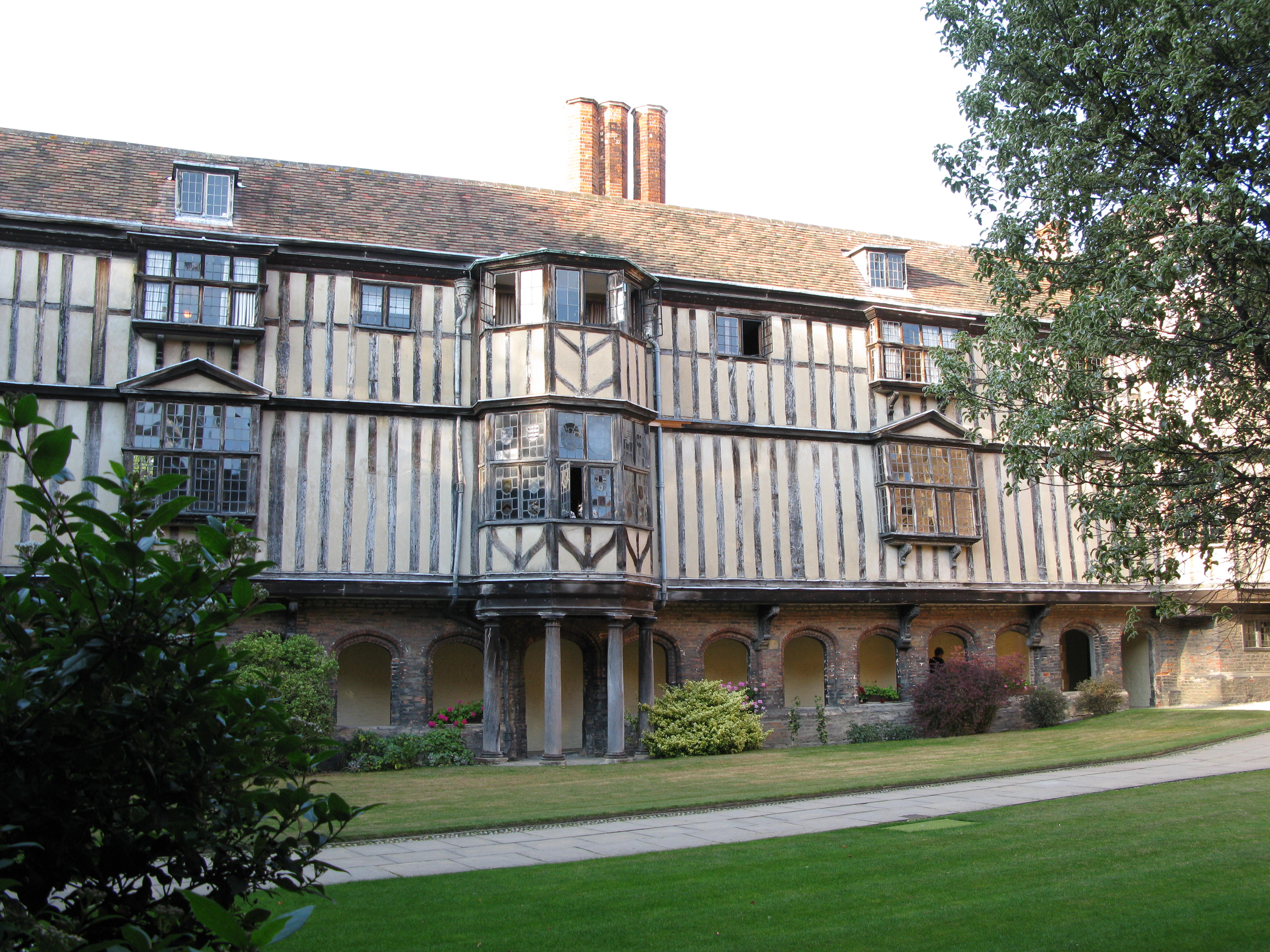
Crummell studied at Queens' College, Cambridge.

In 1847, Crummell traveled to England to raise money for his congregation at the Church of the Messiah. While there, Crummell preached on abolitionism in the United States and raised almost $2,000. From 1849 to 1853, Crummell studied at Queens' College, Cambridge, sponsored by Benjamin Brodie, William Wilberforce, Arthur Penrhyn Stanley, James Anthony Froude, and Thomas Babington Macaulay. Crummell took his finals twice to receive his degree and became the first officially recorded Black student to graduate from Cambridge University. While it appears he was not the first Black student at Cambridge, he is the first for whom official records exist.

At his graduation, Crummell endured a moment of racist heckling until another student, E. W. Benson (a future Archbishop of Canterbury), counter-heckled in his defense:

A pale slim undergraduate [...] shouted in a voice which re-echoed through the building, "Shame, shame! Three groans for you, Sir!" and immediately afterwards, "Three cheers for Crummell!" This was taken up in all directions [...] and the original offender had to stoop down to hide himself from the storm of groans and hisses that broke out all around him.

While in Cambridge, Crummell hosted the abolitionist lecturer William Wells Brown, who had escaped slavery in 1834. Crummell continued to travel around Britain and speak out about slavery and the plight of Black people. During this period, Crummell formulated the concept of Pan-Africanism, which became his central belief for the advancement of the African race. Crummell believed that, to achieve their potential, the African race as a whole, including those in the Americas, the West Indies, and Africa, needed to unify under the banner of race. To Crummell, racial solidarity could solve slavery, discrimination, and continued attacks on the African race. Around this time, Crummell began to have health issues, which doctors said would be remedied in warmer weather. As a result, he moved to Africa to spread his message and recuperate.

=== In Liberia ===
Crummell arrived in Liberia in 1853, at the point in that country's history when Americo-Liberians had begun to govern the former colony for free American Blacks. Crummell came as a missionary of the American Episcopal Church with the stated aim of converting native Africans. Though Crummell had previously opposed colonization, his experiences with the civilizing mission in Liberia changed his mind. His name appears on an 1859 document signed by citizens of the county of Maryland, Liberia.

Crummell began to preach that "enlightened", or Christianized, ethnic Africans in the United States and the West Indies had a duty to go to Africa. There, they would help civilize and Christianize the continent. When enough native Africans had been converted, they would take over converting the rest of the population, while those from the western hemisphere would work to educate the people and run a republican government. Crummell influenced Liberian intellectual and religious life as a preacher, prophet, social analyst, and educator, proclaiming a special place for Africa in the history of redemption because of its God-given moral and religious potential. Crummell would give multiple lectures and addresses, such as "Liberia, the land of promise to free colored men" and "The future of Africa." These speeches were delivered in America and in Liberia to gain support for his ideas. But Crummell never realized his grand scheme. Most American Blacks were more interested in gaining equal rights in the United States than in colonizing or converting Africans. While Crummell successfully served as both a pastor and professor in Liberia, he could not create the society he envisioned. In 1873, fearing his life was in danger from the Americo-Liberian ascendancy, Crummell returned to the United States.

=== Return to the United States ===
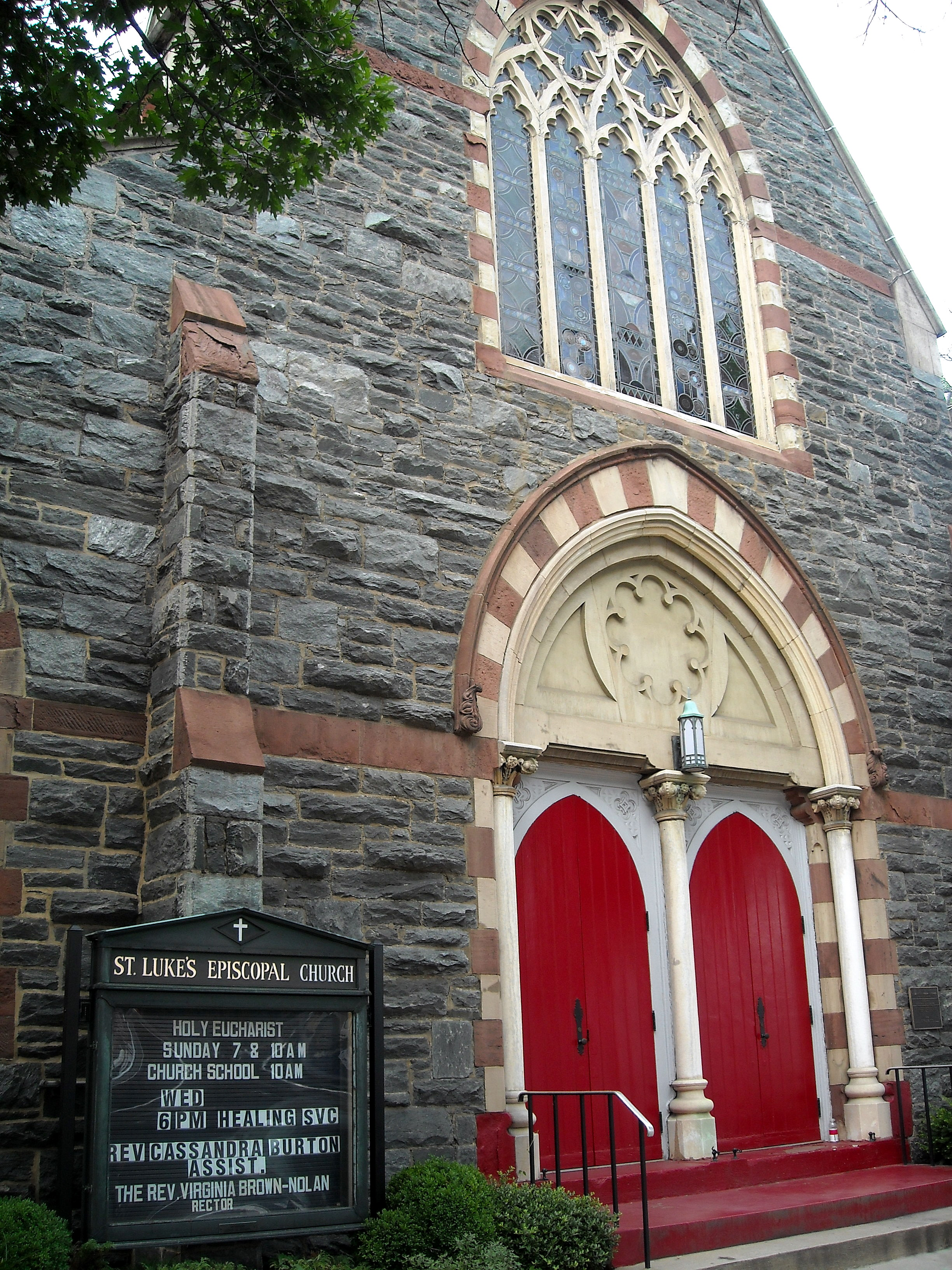
St. Luke's Episcopal Church, DC

He was called as pastor for St. Mary's Episcopal Mission in Washington, DC, in the Foggy Bottom area. It was then a predominantly African-American, working-class neighborhood. In 1875, he and his congregation founded St. Luke's Episcopal Church, the first independent Black Episcopal church in the city. They raised funds to construct a new church on Upper 15th Street, N.W., in the Columbia Heights area, which began construction in 1876 and was completed in 1880. The church's inaugural service was the Thanksgiving celebration in 1879. Crummell served as rector at St. Luke's until his retirement in 1894. The church was designated a National Historic Landmark in 1976.

Despite his frustrations, Crummell never stopped working for the racial solidarity he had long advocated. Throughout his life, Crummell worked for Black nationalism, self-help, and separate economic development. Until his death, he continued to give sermons and speeches about these causes, such as "The race-problem in America" and "Charitable institutions in colored churches". He spent the last years of his life founding the American Negro Academy, the first organization to support African-American scholars, which opened in 1897 in Washington, DC. Crummell taught at Howard University from 1895 to 1897. Alexander Crummell died in Red Bank, New Jersey, while on vacation in 1898.

== Influence ==
Crummell was an important voice in the abolitionist movement and a leader of Pan-African ideology. Crummell's legacy can be seen not only in his personal achievements, such as his help founding the American Negro Academy, but also in the influence he exerted on other Black nationalists and Pan-Africanists, such as Marcus Garvey, Paul Laurence Dunbar, and W. E. B. Du Bois.

=== Scholarship ===
Du Bois paid tribute to Crummell with a memorable essay entitled "Of Alexander Crummell", collected in his 1903 book, The Souls of Black Folk. Great attention has been paid to Crummell's work in colonization, Pan-Africanism, and religious missionary endeavors. Wilson J. Moses, a professor of African-American history, wrote of Crummell's role in his perceived "civilizing" of Liberia. In 2002, the scholar Molefi Kete Asante listed Alexander Crummell on his list of 100 Greatest African Americans. For the 2020 collection Black Political Thought, Charisse Burden-Stelly included a section on Crummell in her essay "Race and Racism". The book also contains the Crummell lecture The Race Problem in America.

== Legacy and honors ==
Crummell's private papers are held by the Schomburg Center for Research in Black Culture, of the New York Public Library in Harlem. The Alexander Crummell School in Washington, DC, was named after him. A street in Annapolis, Maryland, is named after Crummell. Crummell is included on a New Hampshire historical marker (number 246) commemorating Noyes Academy in Canaan, New Hampshire.

In 2021, Queens' College, Cambridge established the Alexander Crummell Scholarships for students from disadvantaged backgrounds or those currently under-represented at Cambridge University. A portrait photograph of Crummell is mounted in the Essex Room of the President's Lodge at Queens' College.

On April 24, 2023, Yale University awarded M.A Privatim degrees to Crummell along with the first known Black student at Yale, Rev. James W.C. Pennington, acknowledging the discrimination they faced while students at the university.

== Veneration ==
Crummell is honored with a feast day on the liturgical calendar of the Episcopal Church (USA) on September 10.

== Works ==
- 1846: The man: the hero: the Christian! : A eulogy on the life and character of Thomas Clarkson: delivered in the city of New-York; Dec. 1846 at the Internet Archive
- 1861: Liberia, the land of promise to free colored men at the Internet Archive
- 1861: The relations and duties of free colored men in America to Africa. A letter to Charles B. Dunbar .. at the Internet Archive
- 1862: The future of Africa: being addresses, sermons, etc., etc., delivered in the Republic of Liberia
- 1882: The greatness of Christ : and other sermons at the Internet Archive
- 1883: A defence of the negro race in America from the assaults and charges of Rev. J. L. Tucker, D. D., of Jackson, Miss., in his paper before the "Church Congress" of 1882, on "The relations of the church to the colored race." Prepared and published at request of the colored clergy of the Prot. Epis. Church at the Internet Archive
- 1883: The Black woman of the South at the Internet Archive
- 1889: The race-problem in America at the Internet Archive
- 1891: Look within at the Internet Archive
- 1891: Africa and America: addresses and discourses at the Internet Archive
- 1892: Charitable institutions in colored churches at the Internet Archive
- 1894: The shades and the lights of a fifty years' ministry: jubilate : a sermon by Alex. Crummell, rector, and a presentation address by Mrs. A.J. Cooper at the Internet Archive
- 1897: Civilization the Primal Need of the Race The American Negro Academy. Occasional Paper No. 3 at the Internet Archive

== See also ==
- National Afro-American League, set up in 1890 and based on racial solidarity and self-help
- Black separatism, as distinguished from Black nationalism
- William Taylor (missionary), Missionary in Africa
- Robert Moffat (missionary), Missionary in Africa
