= St. Luke's Episcopal Church (Washington, D.C.) =

Historic church in Washington, D.C., United States

- St. Luke's Episcopal Church; Washington, D.C.
- U.S. National Register of Historic Places
- U.S. National Historic Landmark
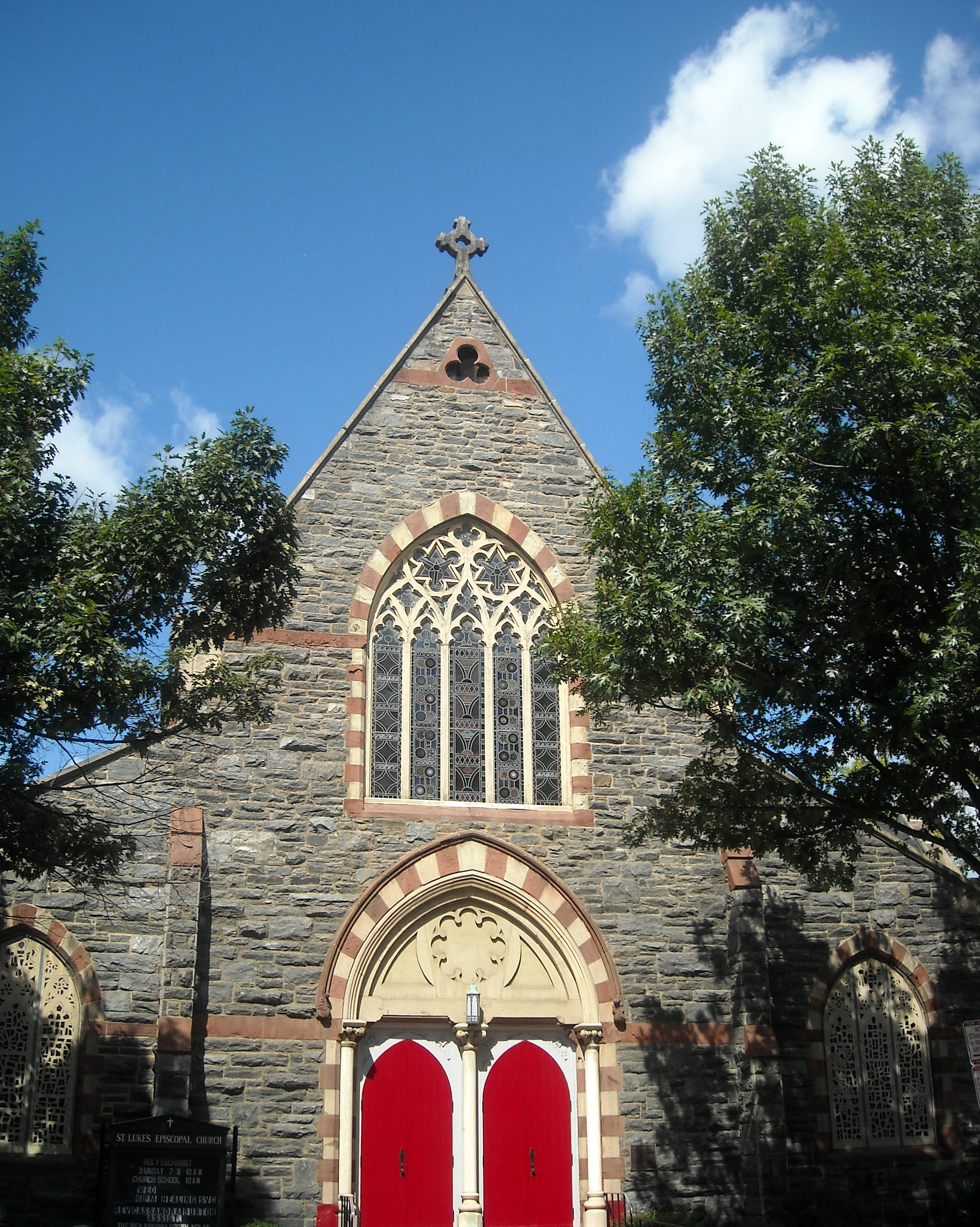
- St. Luke's Episcopal Church

- Location within Washington, D.C. Location within the United States
- Location: 1514 15th Street, N.W. Washington, D.C.
- Coordinates: 38°54′37″N 77°2′5″W
- Built: 1876–1880
- NRHP reference No.: 76002131

Significant dates
- Added to NRHP: May 11, 1976
- Designated NHL: May 11, 1976

St. Luke's Episcopal Church is a historic Episcopal church located at 1514 15th Street, N.W., in Washington, D.C. Completed in 1879, it is home to the oldest African-American Episcopal congregation in the city. It was designated a U.S. National Historic Landmark in 1976 for its association with Rev. Alexander Crummell (1819–1898), a leading figure advocating for black self-sufficiency and civil rights in the mid-19th century.

St. Luke's is an active parish in the Episcopal Diocese of Washington. As of 2022, the Rector is the Rev. Kim Turner Baker. The church reported 301 members in 2015 and 110 members in 2023; no membership statistics were reported in 2024 parochial reports. Plate and pledge income reported for the congregation in 2024 was $300,327. Average Sunday attendance (ASA) in 2024 was 61 persons.

== Architecture ==
St. Luke's Episcopal Church is located west of Washington's Logan Circle, on the west side of 15th Street at its junction with Church Street. It is a masonry structure built mainly out of Chesapeake bluestone with an ashlar finish and laid in random courses. A steeply pitched slate roof covers it. The main facade is symmetrical, with a large central entry portico consisting of two pairs of double doors set in a Gothic arch surround and a large Gothic-arched window in the gable above. Flank lower wings each have smaller but still substantial Gothic windows. The interior is finished in dark oak and has a barrel-vaulted ceiling with posts of iron and wood supporting the roof trusses.

== History ==
In 1875, some members of St. Mary's Chapel for Colored People in Foggy Bottom and their rector, the Rev. Alexander Crummell of New York City and Liberia (where he worked for 20 years), left St. Mary's to found St. Luke's as the first independent black Episcopal church in Washington. St. Luke's was chartered as a Colored Episcopal Mission. Its neighborhood of Columbia Heights had numerous black families.

Calvin Brent, generally considered Washington's first black architect, designed the church after an Anglican church in Cambridge, England. Construction on the church began in 1876 and completed in 1880.

The first service was held on Thanksgiving Day, 1879. Alexander Crummell served as rector until his retirement in 1894.

== See also ==
- National Register of Historic Places in the upper NW Quadrant of Washington, D.C.
- St. Luke's Church (disambiguation)
- Black church
