= Calvin Brent =

American architect

Calvin Thomas Stowe Brent
- Born: 1854; Washington, D.C., U.S.
- Died: November 14, 1899 (aged 44–45); Washington, D.C., U.S.
- Other name: Calvin T.S. Brent
- Occupation: Architect
- Known for: St. Luke's Episcopal Church (Washington, D.C.), Third Baptist Church (Washington, D.C.)

Calvin Thomas Stowe Brent (1854–1899) was an American architect. He is generally thought to be the first African-American to practice architecture in Washington, D.C.

== Biography ==
Calvin Thomas Stowe Brent was born in 1854 in Washington, D.C., son of John and Elizabeth Edmondson Brent. He was the seventh of eight children. Calvin Stowe seems to have been named for Calvin Ellis Stowe, the husband of Harriet Beecher Stowe. His father had been born a slave but had earned enough money to buy his freedom and obtained a government job.

In 1847 his father founded the John Wesley A.M.E. Zion Church in Washington, D.C. and became the first pastor. He bought land at 18th and L streets, NW Washington where he built the family house in which Calvin T.S. Brent was born. As a young man Calvin Bent played second base on the second team of the "1st Relief Base Ball club of the City of Washington."

Brent was apprenticed to the architectural firm of Plowman and Weightman at the age of nineteen, the first known occasion when a black architect apprenticed to learn his profession from a white architect. In 1875, he began practicing as an architect, and during his career undertook over one hundred projects throughout Washington, D.C. Brent undertook most of his work between the mid-1880s and 1893, when the pace of building in Washington, D.C. was hurt by an economic depression. Brent is sometimes listed as both builder and architect on city permits. Probably he combined the two trades rather than specializing in fine architecture, which would have been beyond the means of his clients. He gained commissions to build speculative housing from prosperous clients such as the Wormley family, Dr. John Francis and Douglass Syphax, but was not asked to build homes or churches for the black elite of the city.

His father's congregation was a valuable source of architectural commissions. In 1874 Brent married Albertine Jones, daughter of a prosperous feed merchant. They had seven children.

Calvin's son, John Edmonson Brent (born in 1889 and named after his grandfather), was also an architect and practiced in Buffalo, New York. Among John's many notable commissions was the design for an entrance court at the Buffalo Zoo. After Albertine died, Calvin Brent married Laurelia Brown, a widow with a private income. Calvin Brent died suddenly on November 14, 1899, at the age of 45, and was buried in Harmony Cemetery in Washington, DC on November 17, 1899. He lived at 1800 L Street, NW at the time of his death. In the early 1900s he was held up as an example to aspiring young African-American architects. His Washington, D.C. residence at 1700 V Street, NW is on the African American Heritage Trail of that city, and is marked with a plaque. He lived at this house for a short period in the early 1890s with his second wife Laurelia.

== Work ==
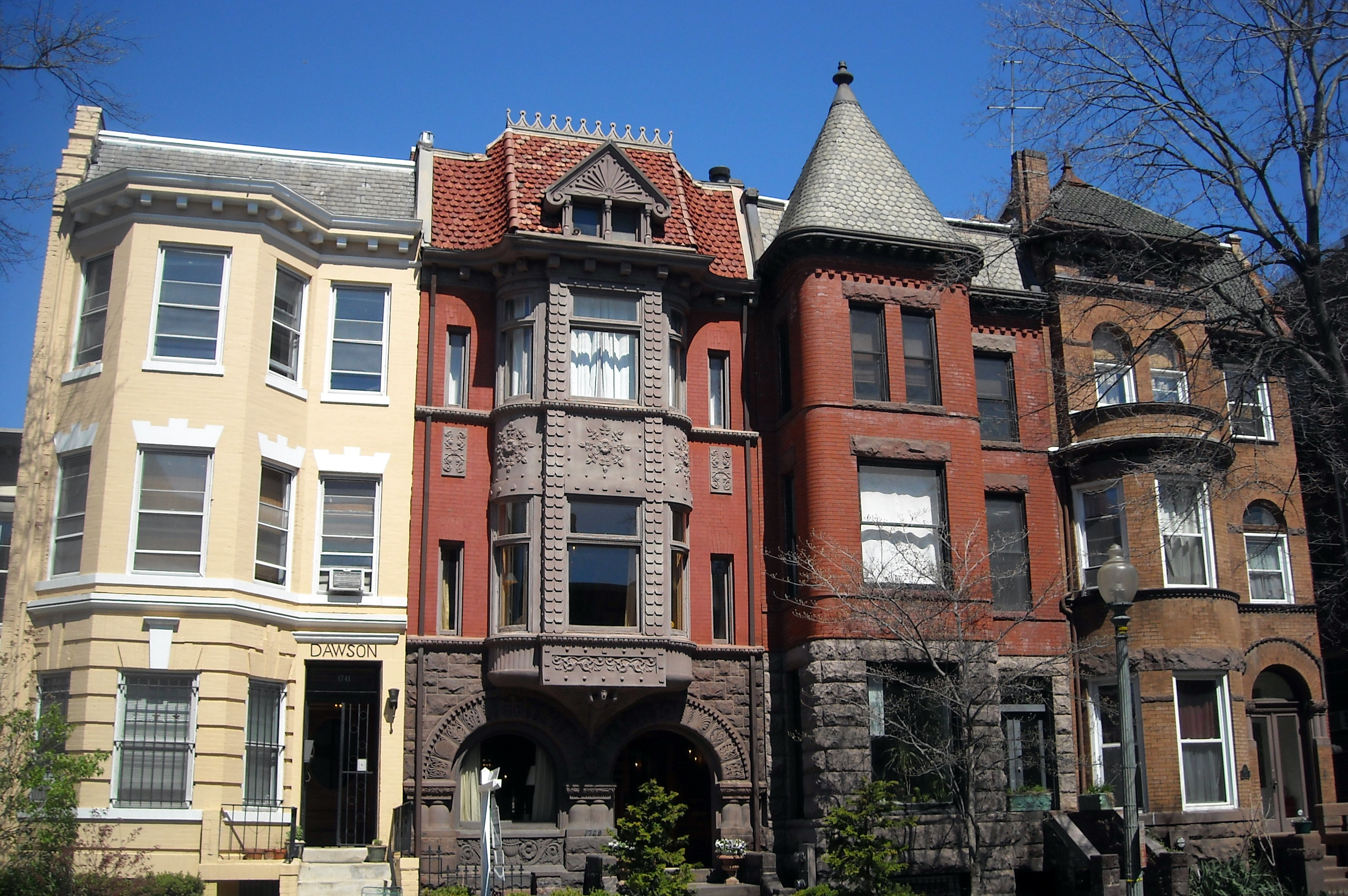
1735 to 1741 S Street NW. Brent built 1737 S Street. The Queen Anne style home was built for J. L. Rogers in 1892.

Brent was responsible for St. Luke's Episcopal Church at 15th and Church streets, NW, but is thought to have adapted plans from England for this building. Saint Luke's was founded by the African American minister Alexander Crummell. Construction of the Gothic-style chapel began in 1876, when Brent was twenty-two. Saint Luke's was the first Episcopal Church for Blacks that was completely independent of any white church. In 1976 the church was placed in the National Register of Historic Places.

The Fourth Metropolitan Baptist Church at 13th and R streets, NW was one of the city's largest African American churches. It had symmetrically placed towers and Gothic ornamentation, as with three of Brent's other church designs. Brent also designed the Mount Jezreel Baptist at Fifth and E streets, SE, the Miles Chapel at 1110 Third Street, NW (later called the Miles Memorial Colored Methodist Episcopal Church) and Third Baptist Church at 1546 Fifth Street, NW.

Many of Brent's buildings were demolished when the areas in which they stood were redeveloped. The Mount Jezreel, Third Baptist, and St. Luke's churches are still standing, as are 17 houses or groups of houses that Brent built. His residential projects were mostly standard 2- or 3-story brick row houses, with typical architecture for the period in Washington, D.C.. Brent designed a group of houses that were rented out by the John Wesley African Episcopal Zion Church. He built a row of nine buildings for the developer William A. Stewart at 4th and E Streets, NE, on Capitol Hill, which are still standing. He built a group of ten houses at Grant Street and Florida Avenue, NW. The towered corner house in this group was built for Garrett Wormley, his brother-in-law, and drew praise from the Washington Bee. Brent designed many of the houses on U and V streets in the "Strivers' Section" of NW Washington. Part of the surviving section was designated a historic district in 1980.

== Gallery ==
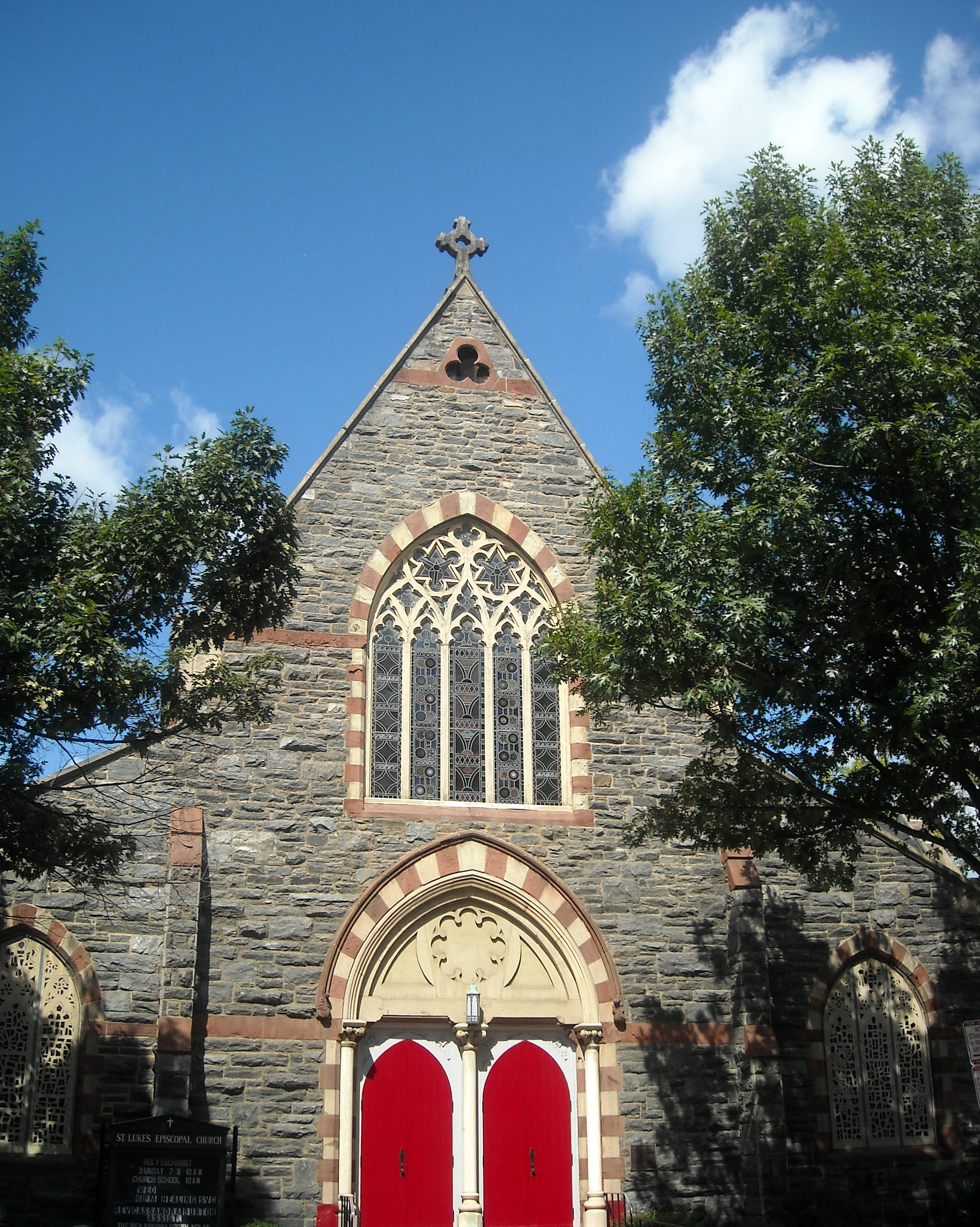
Facade of St. Luke's Episcopal Church at 15th and Church streets, NW

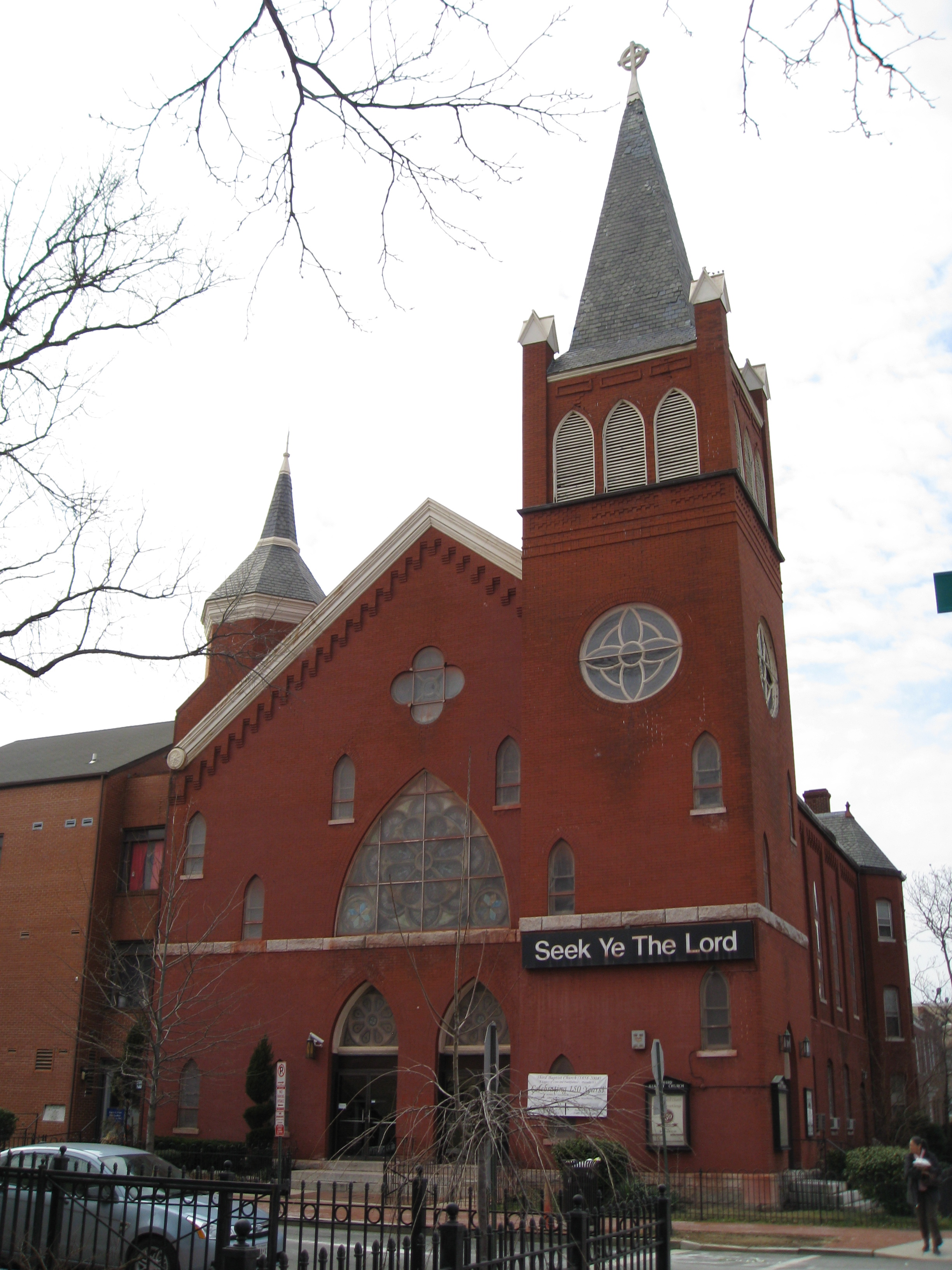
Third Baptist Church, 1546 Fifth Street, NW

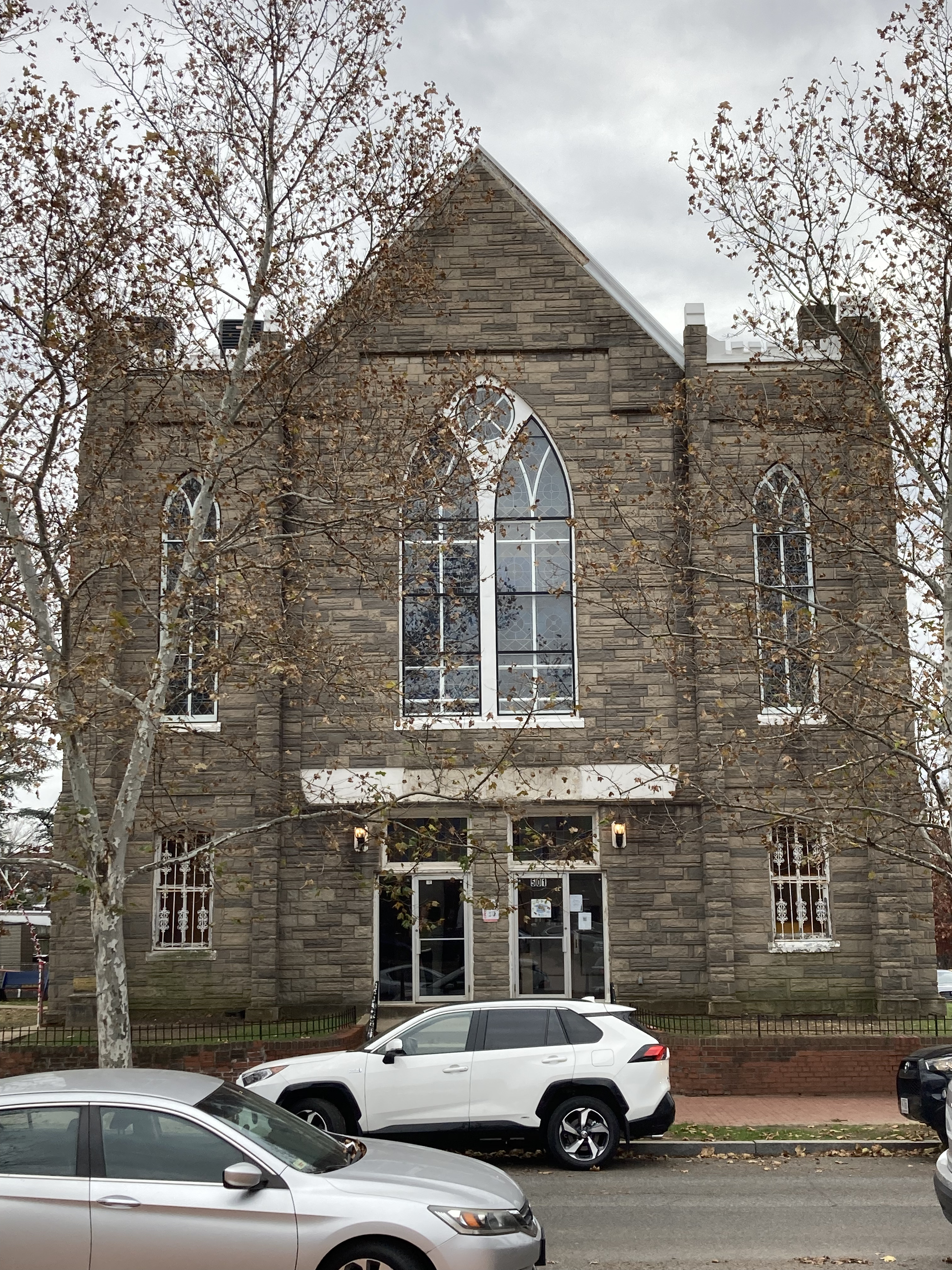
Facade of Church of the Resurrection on Capitol Hill, originally Mount Jezreel Baptist Church

== See also ==
- African-American architects
- Isaiah T. Hatton (1883–1921), another African American architect working in the D.C. area at the same time. Both are credited on the Third Street Baptist Church

== Notes and references ==
Citations

Sources

- "Calvin T.S. Brent Residence, African-American Heritage Trail". Cultural Tourism DC.
- Cromwell, Adelaide M. (2007). Unveiled Voices, Unvarnished Memories: The Cromwell Family in Slavery And Segregation, 1692-1972. University of Missouri Press. p. 94. ISBN 978-0-8262-1676-2.
- Hornsby, Alton (2011-08-23). Black America: A State-by-State Historical Encyclopedia. ABC-CLIO. ISBN 978-0-313-34112-0.
- Justesen, Banjamin R. (2012-07-02). George Henry White: An Even Chance in the Race of Life. LSU Press. p. 257. ISBN 978-0-8071-4477-0.
- Ricks, Mary Kay (2008-01-29). Escape on the Pearl: The Heroic Bid for Freedom on the Underground Railroad. HarperCollins. ISBN 978-0-06-078660-1.
- Wilson, Dreck Spurlock (2004). "Calvin Thomas Stowe Brent (1854-1899)". African-American Architects: A Biographical Dictionary, 1865-1945. Taylor & Francis. ISBN 978-0-415-92959-2.
