= Douglas Syphax =

American Soldier

- Born: c. 1842; Alexandria, District of Columbia
- Died: 4 February 1890
- Occupation: Property developer
- Known for: Union Army officer during American Civil War
- Relatives: Syphax family

Douglas Syphax (c. 1842 – 4 February 1890) or Douglass Syphax was an African American from Virginia who resettled in Philadelphia, Pennsylvania after the American Civil War. A military veteran, he was active in the Grand Army of the Republic in the late 19th century, and he also became a property developer in Philadelphia.

He was one of the few African Americans to gain commissions as sergeants in the US Colored Troops serving in the American Civil War.

== Background ==
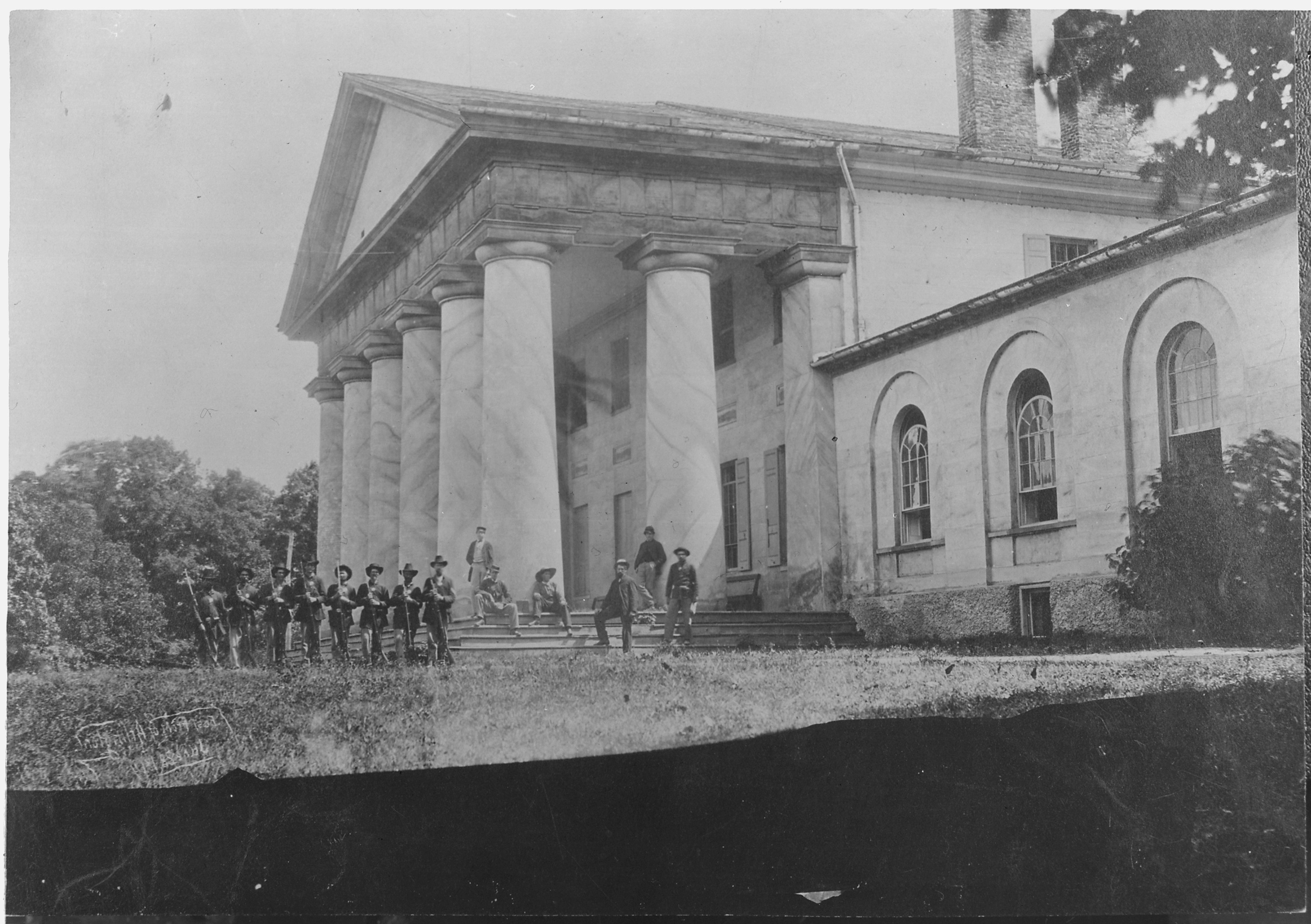
East front of Arlington Mansion in 1864. Douglas Syphax's relatives were married in the mansion.

As a relative of Charles Syphax, Douglas Syphax was related to an African-American family in Virginia who were granted land in Arlington County, Virginia. In the 1940s it became part of Arlington National Cemetery. The family was descended from Martha Washington (1731–1802), wife of President George Washington (1732–1799). The family, considered part of the elite in African-American society, traces its origins to Mariah (with an "h") Custis, the mixed race daughter of planter George Washington Parke Custis (1781–1857), the only grandson of Martha Washington. Mariah's mother was Ariana Carter, one of Custis's house slaves.

When Mariah Custis asked her father for permission to marry Charles Syphax, one of his slaves, he freed them both, held a wedding for them in his Arlington mansion, and gave them fifteen acres (Note: The Arlington property remained in the Syphax family until the 1940s, when the Federal government asked the Syphax family to exchange it for land elsewhere in the district to accommodate expansion of the cemetery. The Syphax family cemetery was transferred to the Lincoln Memorial Cemetery as part of the exchange.) of his Arlington estate. Mary Custis (1808–1873), Mariah's white half-sister, was to marry the Confederate General Robert E. Lee (1807–1870). Mariah and Charles had ten children, several of whom were given important political positions from the 1850s onward. Their eldest son, William Syphax, was eventually appointed superintendent of Washington's black segregated school district.

== Life ==
Douglas Syphax was born in Arlington, Alexandria, District of Columbia in about 1842. In 1864 he entered the Union Army, serving for ten months before being honorably discharged and reaching the rank of sergeant. He settled in Philadelphia, Pennsylvania, which had been a center of free blacks since the Revolutionary War.

There Douglas Syphax married Abbie McKee, daughter of the wealthy African-American businessman John McKee, known by the honorific of Colonel. A free man of color, McKee had migrated to Philadelphia from Virginia in the 1840s. There he started work as a waiter, later becoming the owner of restaurants. He also moved into real estate and reputedly became a very wealthy man.

In the late 1800s Syphax also became involved in speculative real-estate, as Philadelphia industry was attracting many new residents. He hired African-American architect Calvin Brent to design houses for him.

He was a member of the Oliver P. Morton Post of the Grand Army of the Republic. Syphax was appointed to Post 3 in the Relief Committee of the Grand Army's Department of the Potomac, which was active from February 1888 to August 1889. It determined which Civil War veterans should be eligible for relief.

He died on 4 February 1890. His wife, Abbie, lived until 19 February 1923. Because of Syphax's military service, both were buried in Arlington National Cemetery.

== Children ==
When Colonel McKee died, he left Abbie Syphax a legacy of $300, and $50 for each of her children. Her nephew Henry McKee Minton, later to become a prominent physician, was also given $50. Most of the rest was bequeathed to the Catholic Church to fund a college for orphans. The will was disputed, and Abbie eventually gained $26,500 from Colonel McKee's will. When she remarried in 1904, she was reported to be "the richest colored woman in this city, and perhaps in the world."

Douglas and Abbie had five children.

- Ernest Syphax became a pharmacist in Pittsburgh.
- Carrie Syphax Watson was the first Black director of domestic art in the public schools of the District of Columbia.
- Both Mary E. Syphax and Julia Syphax Willis became public school teachers.
- Theophilus John Minton Syphax attended Phillips Exeter Academy in New Hampshire, where he was a classmate and friend of future educator Roscoe Conkling Bruce. In his 20s, Theophilus changed his name to T. John McKee and decided to pass for white to evade racial discrimination. He graduated from Columbia University and became a lawyer on Wall Street, living in Manhattan. He cut off relations with his family and married a white woman; they had two sons together before getting divorced. Later he married another white woman. In the late 1940s, however, after all his siblings and first cousins had died, he sued for a portion of his grandfather McKee's estate that had not been distributed, and revealed his African-American ancestry.

== Notes and references ==
Notes

Citations

Sources

- "Douglas Syphax". The Journal of Negro history. Association for the Study of Negro Life and History. 1935.
- Graham, Lawrence Otis (1999-12-22). Our Kind of People: Inside America's Black Upper Class. HarperCollins. p. 8. ISBN 978-0-06-098438-0.
- Graham, Lawrence Otis (2007-07-03). The Senator and the Socialite: The True Story of America's First Black Dynasty. HarperCollins. p. 181. ISBN 978-0-06-098513-4.
- Grand Army of the Republic. Dept. of the Potomac (1890). Proceedings of the ... Annual Encampment, Department of the Potomac, Grand Army of the Republic ... Gibson Bros., Printers and Bookbinders. p. 47.
- Lane, Roger (1991). William Dorsey's Philadelphia and Ours: On the Past and Future of the Black City in America. Oxford University Press. ISBN 978-0-19-506566-4.
- Wilson, Dreck Spurlock (2004). African-American Architects: A Biographical Dictionary, 1865-1945. Taylor & Francis. ISBN 978-0-415-92959-2.
