= Algernon B. Jackson =

African American physician (1878–1942)

Algernon Brashear Jackson
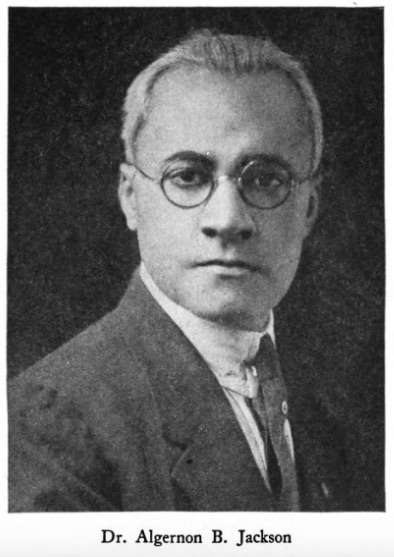
- Born: May 21, 1878; Princeton, Indiana
- Died: October 22, 1942 (aged 64); Washington, D.C.
- Occupations: Physician, professor, author
- Known for: African American public health education
- Spouse: Elizabeth A. Newman

Algernon Brashear Jackson (1878–1942) was a prominent African American physician, surgeon, writer, and columnist who contributed profoundly to the National Negro Health Movement, an organization which sought to uplift African Americans by educating them on preventative medicine and public health. He was also well known for being a founding member of the Sigma Pi Phi fraternity and pioneering an effective treatment for rheumatism.

== Personal life ==
Jackson was born in Princeton, Indiana, on May 21, 1878, to Charles A. Jackson and Sarah L. (née Brashear) Jackson. His mother was a public school teacher in the area and received an extensive education at several institutions, including Indiana University, University of Pennsylvania, Temple University, and Drexel Institute. He married Elizabeth A. Newman on June 20, 1920, in Media, Pennsylvania. He died on October 22, 1942, in his home in Washington, D.C., at age 64.

== Career ==
Jackson attended Indiana University for his undergraduate education and then continued on to Jefferson Medical College in Philadelphia, where, in 1901, he became the first African American to earn his Doctor of Medicine (M.D.) degree from that institution He completed additional post-graduate work at Columbia University and the University of Pennsylvania. He then became an assistant surgeon at Philadelphia Polyclinic Hospital—an institution run exclusively by white physicians. He was the first and only black surgeon to work at the hospital at that time and kept the position for thirteen years. Jackson ran in rather privileged circles within the African American community and had clear ties to Booker T. Washington (via the National Negro Health Movement) and Henry McKee Minton (a well-established doctor of a notoriously wealthy African American family), among others.

In 1907, Jackson cofounded the Mercy Hospital School for Nurses and undertook the position of Surgeon-in-Chief, which he maintained for 15 years before becoming the hospital's Superintendent. He continued in this position for 9 more years until 1921, at which point he left to accept a job at Howard University. He was succeeded as Superintendent by friend and fellow co-founder of Sigma Pi Phi, Henry McKee Minton. From 1921 to 1934 he was a professor of bacteriology and public health, from 1921 to 1925 he was the director of the School of Public Health, and from 1926 to 1928 he was physician in charge at Howard University.

Jackson made headlines in the medical community for discovering the injection of magnesium sulphate as an effective treatment for rheumatism in 1911. In 1904, Jackson, Henry McKee Minton, and two other fellow African American medical professionals became the founding members of Sigma Pi Phi, the first black Greek Letter organization, with the goal of uniting other like-minded black professionals in the North. He authored three books: Evolution and Life: A Series of Lay Sermons, The Man Next Door, and Jim and Mr. Eddy: A Dixie Motorlogue.

== Public health involvement ==
Jackson was heavily involved with the National Negro Health movement during his years as director of the School of Public Health at Howard University until his death in 1942. The movement itself was established in 1915 by Booker T. Washington, who was impressed by the Negro Organization Society of Virginia's implementation of a "clean-up week" in 1913, and sought to bring similar ideals of sanitation and hygiene to a wider national African American audience with National Negro Health Week. Jackson championed this idea, acting as a director of the movement for much of his later life, most likely beginning in the 1920s and continuing into the early 1930s. Jackson was extremely concerned with the relatively high mortality rates of African Americans—specifically those in the poverty-stricken South—and personally believed that educating the African American community on matters of public health and hygiene was the most effective way to uplift the race in all aspects of life. He received most of his notoriety and authority in the African American community from his involvement with the movement, and was even asked to be a delegate to the White House Conference on Child Health and Protection by then-President Hoover in 1930.

Although primarily based out of Philadelphia and Washington, D.C., Jackson made several tours through the South, speaking at African American public schools and community youth centers on matters of hygiene and disease prevention and visiting hospitals to determine the state of Negro health care throughout the country. His findings from the latter tours were published in several journals and included calls to action for the government and the public to improve clinical facilities for Southern African Americans by allocating more money, better equipment, more qualified staff, and—most importantly—preventative educational components.

Jackson also used his platform as a public health columnist in several African American regional newspapers to report on his findings of the state of Negro health in America, which were overwhelmingly described as disappointing or atrocious. The audience he reached through his journalistic work—in publications like the Pittsburgh Courier, the New York Amsterdam News, the Baltimore Afro-American, and the Chicago Defender—was overwhelmingly middle-class, Northern African Americans. His regular columns ranged from health advice ("Afro Health Talk" in the Baltimore Afro-American) to opinion pages ("Week-End Mosaics" in the Pittsburgh Courier), but all were ultimately concerned with the social stature of African Americans.

== Personal beliefs concerning race ==
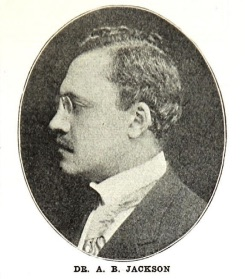
Dr. Algernon B. Jackson

In his article "The Need of Health Education Among Negroes," he underscored the notion that "no man, whatever his motive may be, can help lift up his brother without lifting up himself." In other words, educating the African American community in public health and hygiene would not only lift the race itself by reducing rates of mortality and illness, it would also benefit the whites who would inevitably find themselves in contact with blacks. However, it was abundantly clear that, in Jackson's eyes, not all African Americans shared equal responsibility for the sub-par health of the race as a whole. Most often, the blame for harmful ignorance of public health issues fell on the shoulders of the poor Southern blacks. In turn, Jackson asserted that it was up to black medical leaders to "save a great people who really know very little about how to save themselves."

Most of Jackson's writing—both for the lay public and medical community—included implications of classism and elitism that set Southern blacks lower on the hierarchy than wealthier blacks in cosmopolitan northern cities. On at least one occasion in "Week-End Mosaics," Jackson assured his largely educated Northern readership that their illness and death rates were no worse off than those of Northern whites, and that they were thusly not to blame for high Negro mortality. Southern blacks, on the other hand, he claimed "have no appreciation of [life] and use it to no more purpose than does the dumb animal." As such, he called upon the educated black masses—much like he did with the black medical community—to reach the "poor unfortunate neglected members of our race" and teach them "that better living means better health, longer life, a finer happiness and a greater power for doing the things which we all as a race want to do...[to] make us unafraid and unconquerable."

In 1928, he reported for The Philadelphia Tribune on a German study in which the blood of Jews, Ukrainians, and Russians was tested and analyzed for differences. Jackson wrote that variations were observed (like how quickly the blood reacted with different chemicals, which they chalked up to "oxidation") but the implications and significance of these findings was left simply at the fact that people of difference "races" or ethnicities are, in fact, "chemically different." Regardless of the vagueness of the study and its probable ties to Nazi-backed eugenic exploration, Jackson clearly took a great interest in the experiment and hopefully suggested that "racial identity may be fixed by chemical analysis" in the future. He additionally implied that determining racial makeup through objective measures could potentially prove "more unpopular with whites than with Negroes," either because it will reveal less pure bloodlines in whites, or chemical superiority in blacks.

Despite his occasional favoritism of Northern African Americans and apparent eugenic interests, Jackson did not spare even the most refined and economically advantaged blacks personal hygiene advice, particularly in his "Afro Health Talk" column. Although he was touted in this publication specifically as a "Health Authority and Stomach Specialist," his column explored all matters of preventative medicine, and often linked health issues with the societal perceptions or stereotypes of African Americans. For example, in a column about tuberculosis prevention, Jackson blamed "ignorance, carelessness, indifference, immorality, vicious living and unwillingness to accept advice" for the "untutored" black community's mortality rates from tuberculosis. But even more so, it was the fault of "the social and economic maladjustment born of a slimy race prejudice indigenous to America" that prevented "all citizens, black and white, [from facing] life and death on equal terms."
