= Third Baptist Church (Washington, D.C.) =

Historic church in Washington, D.C., United States

- U.S. National Register of Historic Places
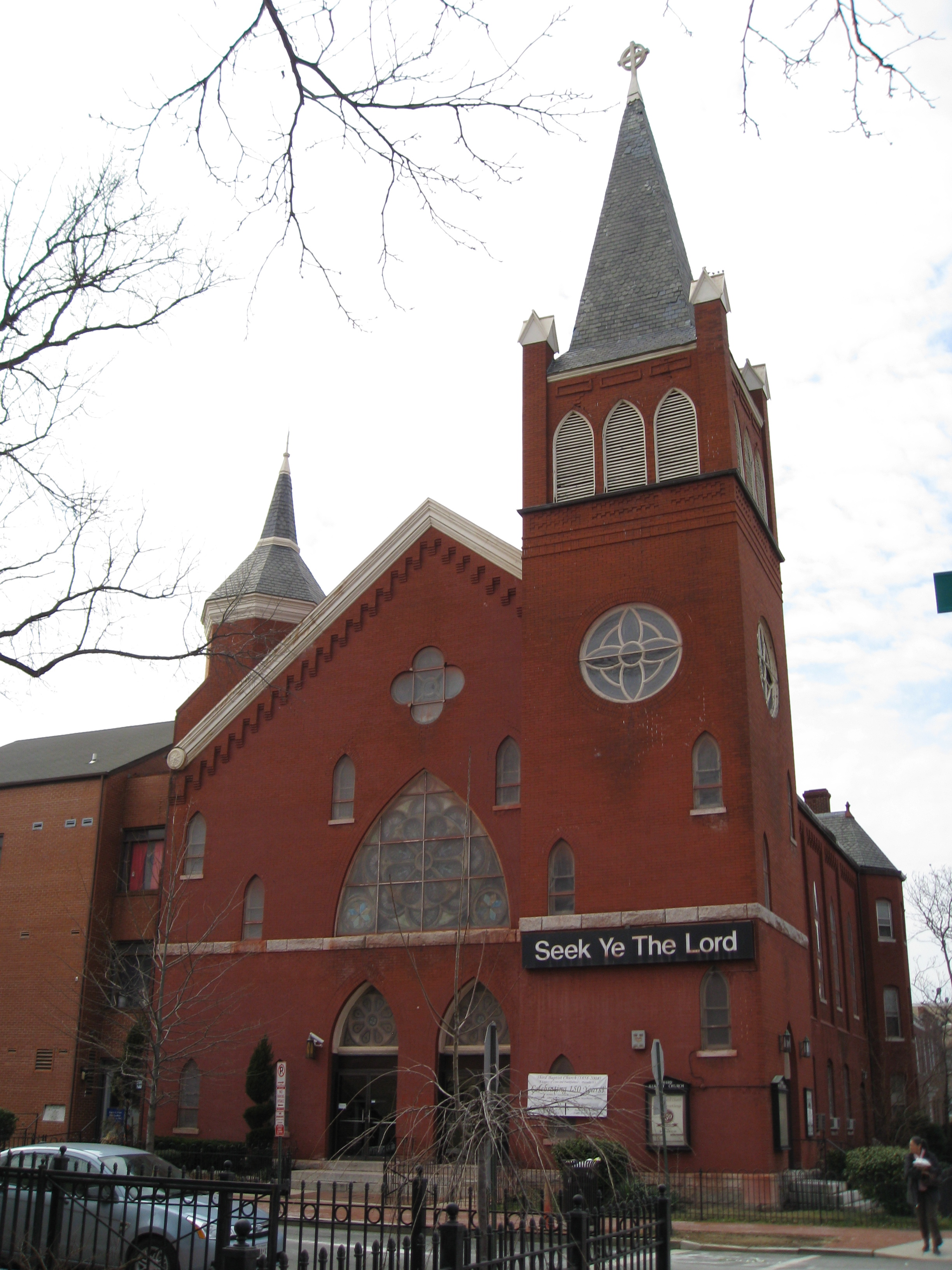

- Location within the District of Columbia Location within the United States
- Location: 1546 5th St., NW., Washington, D.C.
- Coordinates: 38.91094°N 77.01922°W
- Area: Less than one acre
- Built: 1893
- Architect: Brent, Calvin T.S.; Isaiah T. Hatton
- Architectural style: Late Gothic Revival
- NRHP reference No.: 08001094
- Added to NRHP: November 26, 2008

Third Baptist Church is a historic church at 1546 5th Street and Q Street NW in the Shaw neighbourhood of north-western Washington, DC.

It was built in 1893 in Late Gothic Revival style and added to the National Register of Historic Places in 2008. The church was the third oldest Black Baptist Church in Washington, D.C., and the oldest Black Baptist building still standing. In January 2024, the building was sold to Church of the Advent, an Anglican church, and Third Baptist Church moved to a location in Prince George's County, Maryland.

== Architecture ==
According to the National Register of Historic Places nomination form, "Third Baptist Church is an unusually intact example of a late Victorian church built in Washington by an established African American congregation to the designs of noted African American architect Calvin Brent. . . . [T]he original design and materials have been exceptionally well maintained throughout the building."

=== Exterior ===
The Third Baptist Church building is a multi-story, gable-fronted brick building measuring 50 feet wide by 93 feet long, with its entrance on the east side facing Fifth Street NW on the southwest corner of Q Street NW. The exterior is faced with dark red brick and the roof is sheathed in slate. The brick is divided horizontally at the line between the first and second stories with a belt course of rusticated granite. Deep brick corbels are placed just below the east gable end and north roofline.

The asymmetrical Gothic Revival exterior features a tall projecting 109-foot bell tower in the northeast corner, with a smaller hexagonal tower on the southeast corner. The bell tower features round stained glass windows, while the belfry features three louvered lancet vents on each of its four sides. The tower is topped by a four-sided steeple. Lancet windows of varying sizes, plus a small quatrefoil window, dot the east front. The north side of the church is divided into eight bays, most of which feature tall lancet windows.

Attached to the main church to the south is a modern 1981-built office and education annex not included in the National Register listing.

=== Interior ===
The lower level of the church features a fellowship hall. Two rows of iron columns supporting metal beams that hold up the floor of the sanctuary line the room. Following the c. 1919 renovation, a full-immersion baptismal pool was added in the west end of the fellowship hall.

Staircases on either side of the vestibule lead to a basilican-plan sanctuary on the upper level. Galleries added in the 1919 renovation line the sides and rear of the sanctuary and are supported by iron columns with foliate capitals. The galleries partially block the lancet stained glass windows on the three sides. The chancel at the geographical west end includes a prominent pulpit, choir loft, and pipe organ. The original pews survive in the galleries.
