= McKee City, New Jersey =

Populated place in Atlantic County, New Jersey, US

- Census-designated place
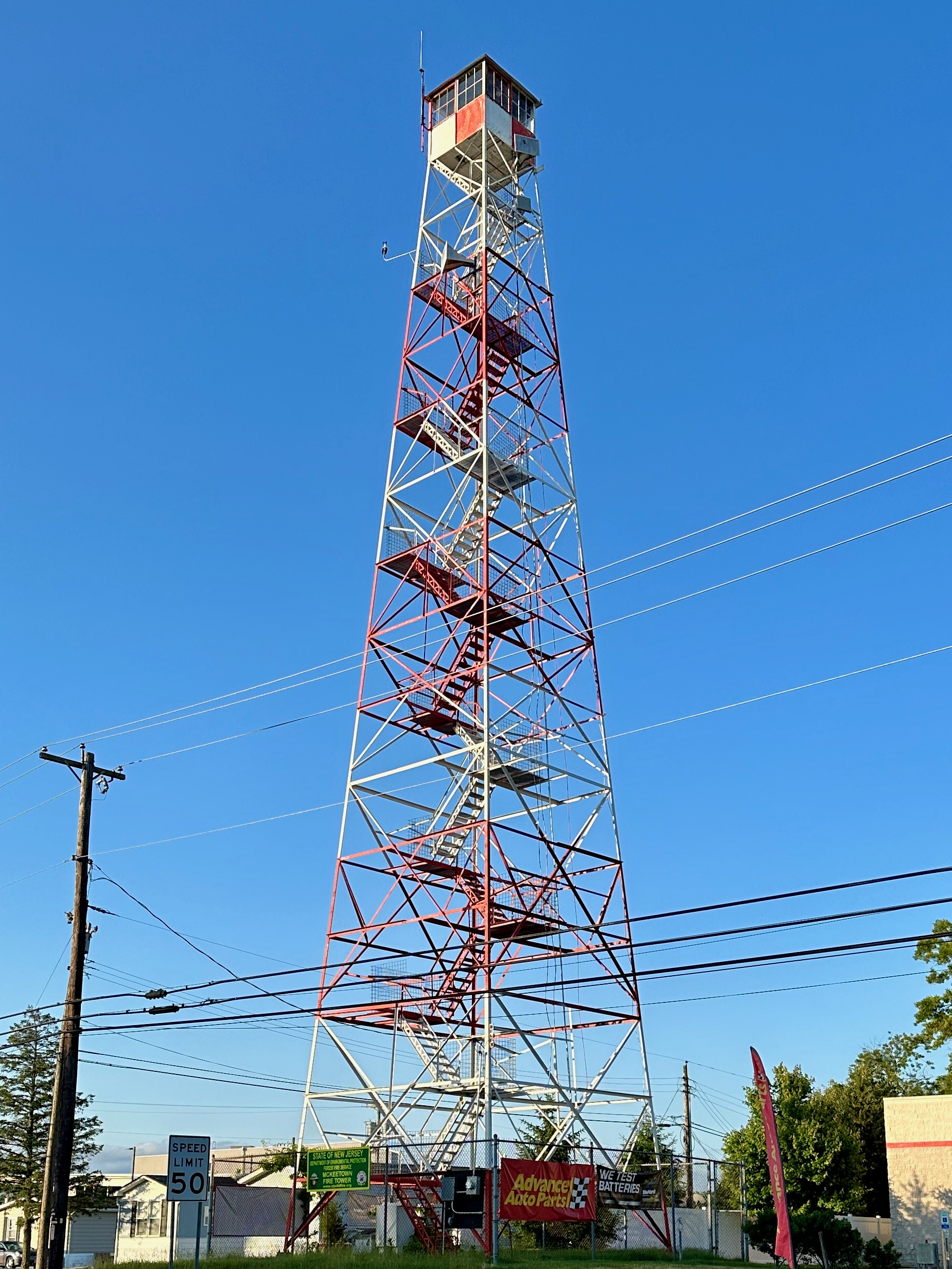
- McKeetown Fire Tower

- Location within Atlantic County. Inset: Location of Atlantic County within New Jersey. McKee City (New Jersey) McKee City (the United States)
- Coordinates: 39°27′01″N 74°38′27″W
- Country: United States
- State: New Jersey
- County: Atlantic
- Township: Hamilton
- Founded: 1884
- Named after: Colonel John McKee

Area
  - Total: 4.83 sq mi (12.52 km^{2})
  - Land: 4.82 sq mi (12.48 km^{2})
  - Water: 0.015 sq mi (0.04 km^{2})
- Elevation: 69 ft (21 m)

Population (2020)
  - Total: 9,758
  - Density: 2,024.8/sq mi (781.79/km^{2})
- Time zone: UTC−05:00 (Eastern (EST))
  - Summer (DST): UTC−04:00 (EDT)
- FIPS code: 34-42420
- GNIS feature ID: 878219

McKee City is an unincorporated community and census-designated place (CDP) located near the Mays Landing section of Hamilton Township in Atlantic County, in the U.S. state of New Jersey. The community was named after Colonel John McKee (1821–1902), an African American property speculator. Although its name includes the word "city", McKee City is not an actual city — it is currently a crossroads of commerce that has replaced tenant farmers with retail stores and residential neighborhoods.

As of the 2020 census, McKee City had a population of 9,758.

McKee City was the site of the former Atlantic City Race Course, and is home to numerous commercial businesses, including the Hamilton Mall, which opened in 1987.

== History ==
McKee City was founded by Colonel John McKee in 1884. It was originally a farming community, along with a sawmill, a schoolhouse, a general store, a community hall, and several farms near the former Pennsylvania-Reading Railroad (currently the site of the Black Horse Pike). Colonel McKee intended to build a 4,000-acre (1,600 ha) planned community where African Americans from the south could settle after the Civil War. A number of dormitory-type houses were built without frills like inside plumbing or heating. Leases were carefully designed to ensure that the tenants improved the land. The Colonel had great plans for this settlement, but he died before they could all be realized.

Upon his death, Colonel McKee made a bequest of $2 million (equivalent to $74.4 million in 2025), to be administered by the Archdiocese of Philadelphia headed by Archbishop Patrick John Ryan, to be partly used "to build a Catholic church, rectory and convent in McKee City..." However, the will was disputed by McKee's family, the funds were not distributed, and the facilities Colonel McKee envisioned were not built.

== Demographics ==
Historical population
Census	Pop.	Note	%±
2020	9,758		—
U.S. Decennial Census; 2020

McKee City was first listed as a census designated place in the 2020 U.S. census.

=== 2020 census ===
As of the 2020 census, McKee City had a population of 9,758. The median age was 37.9 years. 22.1% of residents were under the age of 18 and 14.9% of residents were 65 years of age or older. For every 100 females there were 84.7 males, and for every 100 females age 18 and over there were 81.8 males age 18 and over.

99.8% of residents lived in urban areas, while 0.2% lived in rural areas.

There were 4,100 households in McKee City, of which 32.9% had children under the age of 18 living in them. Of all households, 34.7% were married-couple households, 17.6% were households with a male householder and no spouse or partner present, and 37.8% were households with a female householder and no spouse or partner present. About 29.8% of all households were made up of individuals and 10.3% had someone living alone who was 65 years of age or older.

There were 4,366 housing units, of which 6.1% were vacant. The homeowner vacancy rate was 2.2% and the rental vacancy rate was 7.7%.

McKee City CDP, New Jersey – Racial and ethnic composition Note: the US Census treats Hispanic/Latino as an ethnic category. This table excludes Latinos from the racial categories and assigns them to a separate category. Hispanics/Latinos may be of any race.
Race / Ethnicity (NH = Non-Hispanic)	Pop 2020	2020
White alone (NH)	4,287	43.93%
Black or African American alone (NH)	2,276	23.32%
Native American or Alaska Native alone (NH)	3	0.03%
Asian alone (NH)	892	9.14%
Native Hawaiian or Pacific Islander alone (NH)	1	0.01%
Other race alone (NH)	61	0.63%
Mixed race or Multiracial (NH)	374	3.83%
Hispanic or Latino (any race)	1,864	19.10%
Total	9,758	100.00%

== Education ==
The CDP is within two school districts: Hamilton Township School District (elementary) and Greater Egg Harbor Regional High School District. The zoned high school for Hamilton Township is Oakcrest High School, which is a part of the Greater Egg Harbor district.
