= John McKee (philanthropist) =

American property owner

- Born: c. 1821; Alexandria, District of Columbia, U.S.
- Died: 6 April 1902; Philadelphia, Pennsylvania, U.S.
- Occupation: Property owner
- Known for: Disputed legacy

Colonel John McKee (c. 1821 – 6 April 1902) was an African American who became an extremely wealthy property owner in Philadelphia. McKee City, New Jersey is named after him. His legacy continues to fund scholarships for orphan boys.

== Early life ==
McKee was born in Alexandria, District of Columbia around 1821. (Note: Some sources give McKee's year of birth as 1819. Others say 1821.) An 1838 registration in Alexandria describes him as "a bright mulatto boy, about 19 years old, 5 feet 4½ inches tall, who is straight built with light colored eyes. He was born free, as appears by oaths of Betsey Beckley and Fanny Beckley." He was indentured to a bricklayer while a teenager and ran away, but was brought back to complete his indenture.

== Career ==
McKee moved to Philadelphia, where he found work in a livery yard. He became a waiter, working for James Prosser, who owned a successful restaurant on Market Street in Philadelphia. He married Emeline, Prosser's daughter, and ran the restaurant until 1866, when he moved into property speculation. McKee is said to have fought during the American Civil War (1861–1865).

On June 17, 1870, McKee enlisted in the 12th Regiment of the Pennsylvania National Guard. In 1872, he was made lieutenant colonel of the 13th Regiment. He served under General Louis Wagner.

=== Property tycoon ===
Following the end of the American Civil War, many former slaves were migrating north to seek new opportunities. In Philadelphia, McKee provided them with cheap housing in exchange for rents and for the titles on property that the former slaves had been granted in the South. McKee's expanded his holdings from housing in Philadelphia to acreage in West Virginia, Georgia, and Kentucky. He then sold some of the southern property and bought more land in Philadelphia and land in New York and New Jersey.

McKee seems to have been or become very tight-fisted, spending no money on his office, or on repairs to his houses. According to one person who knew him, "he viewed life and individuals from only one standpoint, and that was what it and they were worth to him personally." A newspaper reporting his death described him as "a man absolutely devoid of sentiment." McKee eventually owned between 300 and 400 houses in Philadelphia. Other properties included about 300,000 acres of coal and oil land in Kentucky and Logan County, West Virginia, 21 acres near Philadelphia's Fifty Street and Oregon Avenue in Philadelphia, and extensive acreage on the Delaware River, in New York state, and elsewhere.

He founded McKee City, New Jersey, a 4,000-acre planned community where African Americans from the south could settle after the Civil War. The city included a schoolhouse, church, and a number of dormitory-type houses. The houses in McKee City were well-built but simple without frills like inside plumbing or heating. Leases were carefully designed to ensure that the tenants improved the land. McKee had great plans for the settlement, but died before they could be realized.

== Personal life ==
McKee had two daughters. Jennie married the lawyer Sawyer Theophilus Minton and had one son, Henry McKee Minton, later to become a prominent physician. Jennie died before her father. Abbie married Douglas Syphax of Arlington County, Virginia. Douglas and Abbie had five children. McKee's wife died in the 1880s.

== Death ==
McKee died at his home in Philadelphia on April 6, 1902, and was buried at Olivet Cemetery. He was survived by his daughter, Mrs. Abbie P. Syphax, and six grandsons. He was reported to be the richest of African Americans when he died. Newspapers speculated that his fortune was anything from $1,500,000 to $4,000,000, a huge amount at the time.

== Legacy ==
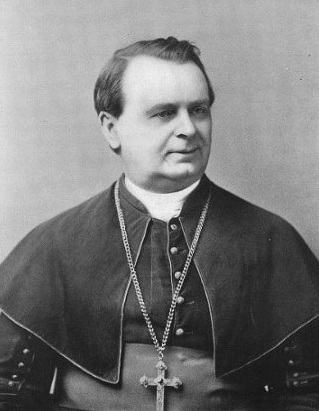
Archbishop Patrick John Ryan was entrusted with administering McKee's legacy

When Colonel McKee died, he left his daughter Abbie a shabby house and a legacy of just $300, and $50 for each of her children. Henry McKee Minton was also given $50, with most of the rest going to the Catholic Church. The $2 million bequest, to be administered by the Archdiocese of Philadelphia headed by Archbishop Patrick John Ryan, was to be used "to build a Catholic church, rectory and convent in McKee City, New Jersey and ... to build and maintain a charitable institution in Philadelphia for the education of both white and colored male orphans."

His choice of the Catholic Church stemmed from his coming down with typhoid fever in 1896. He was turned away by other white caregivers, but Catholic nuns were willing to minister to him and to other African Americans. He also requested in his will to receive a funeral at the Cathedral Basilica of Saints Peter and Paul and burial at Lebanon Cemetery. This did not occur, however, since the will was not read until after he was already given a Presbyterian funeral and burial at Eden Cemetery in Collingdale, Pennsylvania, a few miles outside Philadelphia.

The planned "Colonel John McKee's College" was to be built only after all McKee's children and grandchildren had died. While they lived, they were to gain income from part of his estate. The college would provide naval training for poor orphaned boys from Philadelphia and its surroundings, black or white. An equestrian statue of Colonel McKee would be set up in front of the college. McKee left a photograph of himself for the sculptor to use in creating the statue, which was to be in bronze and to carry the inscription "Colonel John McKee, Founder of this College."

The will was disputed, and Abbie gained $26,500 from Colonel McKee's will while Henry McKee Minton got $25,000 – large sums at the time. Eventually Abbie got $110,000 in exchange for releasing all rights. When she remarried in 1904 she was reported to be "the richest colored woman in this city, and perhaps in the world." One of Abbie's sons was Theophilus John Minton Syphax, a classmate and friend of the future educator Roscoe Conkling Bruce at Phillips Exeter Academy in New Hampshire. Theophilus had a light complexion. He changed his name to T. John McKee and let people think that he was white. He cut off relations with his family and married a white woman with whom he had two children. In the 1940s, however, after all his siblings and first cousins had died, he sued for a portion of his grandfather McKee's estate that had not been distributed. T. John McKee was able to prove that he was McKee's heir, but died before receiving the money.

McKee's great-grandchildren disputed the will, but in October 1952 Judge Robert V. Bolger dismissed their claims. He decided that the remaining estate, now worth just over $1 million, would be used to provide scholarships for orphaned black and white boys. There was not sufficient money to build the college as planned, so providing the educational scholarships was the closest alternative – although a college should be built if the fund grew to become large enough to cover the costs. By 2012, McKee Scholarships had been granted to over 1,000 orphaned boys. Although the college was never built, and the equestrian statue was never created, in 2012 the scholarship committee obtained court permission to use a small amount of the funds to erect a tombstone with McKee's and his wife's names, with an image of a man on horseback.

== Notes and references ==
Notes

Citations

Sources

- "$1 Million McKee Estate To Provide Scholarships". Jet. 2 (24). 9 October 1952. ISSN 0021-5996.
- Byles, Samantha (October 1, 2012). "Colonel John McKee, Unsung Hero of Fatherless Boys in Need Of Scholarships, Finally Gets Tombstone". The Philadelphia Inquirer; Good Black News. Archived from the original on October 17, 2014.
- Cobb, W. Montague M.D. (July 1955). "Hentry McKee Minton, 1870–1946". J Natl Med Assoc. 47 (4): 285–6. PMC 2617666. PMID 20893761.
- Graham, Lawrence Otis (2007-07-03). The Senator and the Socialite: The True Story of America's First Black Dynasty. HarperCollins. p. 181. ISBN 978-0-06-098513-4.
- "John McKee Biography and Archives". McKee Scholars.
- Lane, Roger (1991). William Dorsey's Philadelphia and Ours: On the Past and Future of the Black City in America. Oxford University Press. p. 101. ISBN 978-0-19-506566-4.
- Madella, William H. (January 17, 2012). "Colonel John McKee". theotheralexandria.
- Ryan, Patrick (2010-02-26). Archbishop Patrick John Ryan His Life and Times: Ireland - St. Louis - Philadelphia 1831-1911. AuthorHouse. ISBN 978-1-4389-9822-0.
- Taylor, Grace (2007-11-11). "McKee City". eht.com (Egg Harbor Township). Archived from the original on 2012-10-23.
- Waltzer, Jim; Wilk, Tom (2001-10-01). Tales of South Jersey: Profiles and Personalities. Rutgers University Press. ISBN 978-0-8135-3007-9.
