= Sigma Pi Phi =

African-American fraternity

- ΣΠΦ
- Founded: 1904; 122 years ago Philadelphia, Pennsylvania
- Type: Professional non-collegiate
- Affiliation: Independent
- Status: Active
- Emphasis: African American
- Scope: International
- Colors: Blue
- Symbol: Sphinx
- Publication: The Boulé Journal
- Chapters: 144
- Members: 5,800 lifetime
- Nickname: Boulé
- Headquarters: 260 Peachtree Street NW, Suite 1604; Atlanta, Georgia 30303; United States
- Website: http://www.sigmapiphi.com

Sigma Pi Phi (ΣΠΦ), also known as The Boulé, is an African American professional fraternity. Founded in Philadelphia, Pennsylvania, in 1904, it is the oldest Greek lettered fraternity for African Americans. The fraternity does not have collegiate chapters and is designed for professionals in mid-career or older. Sigma Pi Phi has over 5,000 members and 139 chapters throughout the United States, the United Kingdom, and the Bahamas.

== History ==
Sigma Pi Phi was founded in Philadelphia, Pennsylvania in 1904 as a professional fraternity for African American men. When Sigma Pi Phi was founded, black professionals were not offered participation in the professional and cultural associations organized by the white community. Its founders were:.

- Robert J. Abele (1875–1929), graduated at the top of his 1895 class at Hahnemann University Medical School (and was its first Black graduate) who earned the highest score ever awarded at that point on the state's medical certification test, the Pennsylvania State Qualifying Examination for Physicians, in 1897 (where he scored 97.3% out of 100%).
- Eugene T. Hinson - a medical doctor and cofounder of Mercy Hospital in Philadelphia, which opened in 1907.
- Edwin C .J. T. Howard (October 21, 1846 – May 10, 1912) member of the Harvard Medical School Class of 1869 who practiced medicine in Charleston South Carolina and then Philadelphia, Pennsylvania where he founded Frederick Douglass Hospital in 1895 and Mercy Hospital in 1907
- Algernon B. Jackson (1878–1942), prominent African American physician, surgeon, writer, and columnist who contributed profoundly to the National Negro Health Movement, an organization that sought to uplift African Americans by educating them on preventative medicine and public health.
- Henry McKee Minton, pharmacist and doctor who was superintendent of the Mercy Hospital of Philadelphia
- Richard J. Warrick Jr. (1880–1957) Penn Dental School (Class of 1899), where he was the second Black person to graduate

The fraternity does not have collegiate chapters and is designed to be a professional fraternity for African American men at mid-career or older. Sigma Pi Phi quickly established chapters (referred to as "member boulés" (Note: The word boulé, derived from ancient Greek βουλή, originally referred to a council of nobles advising a king. It is also used by the African-American sorority Alpha Kappa Alpha.)) in Chicago, Illinois and then Baltimore, Maryland.

Founded as an organization for professionals, Sigma Pi Phi never established collegiate chapters and eliminated undergraduate membership during its infant stages. However, Sigma Pi Phi has historically had a congenial relationship with intercollegiate Black Greek-letter organizations, as many members of Sigma Pi Phi are members of both.

Lawrence Otis Graham reported on the organization and his membership in it in the 1999 book Our Kind of People: Inside America's Black Upper Class.

Sigma Pi Phi has over 5,000 members and 139 chapters throughout the United States, the United Kingdom, and The Bahamas. Its national headquarters is in Atlanta, Georgia.

The fraternity is known as "the Boulé," which means, in ancient Greek "the Council".

The fraternity's badge depicts a Sphinx, symbolizing wisdom and inner spirit, sitting above the Greek letters ΣΠΦ. Its color is blue. Its publication is The Boulé Journal.

== Membership ==
Membership in Sigma Pi Phi is highly exclusive.

== Chapters ==
Sigma Pi Phi has 139 chapters throughout the United States, the United Kingdom, and The Bahamas.

== Notable members ==
Sigma Pi Phi has around 5,000 members.

== See also ==
- List of African American fraternities and sororities
- American Black Upper Class
