= Henry McKee Minton =

American physician

- Born: 25 December 1870; Columbia, South Carolina, United States
- Died: 29 December 1946 (aged 76); Philadelphia
- Occupation: Doctor
- Known for: Sigma Pi Phi founder

Henry McKee Minton (25 December 1870 - 29 December 1946) was an African-American medical doctor who was one of the founders of Sigma Pi Phi and was Superintendent of the Mercy Hospital of Philadelphia for twenty-four years. He wrote on medical care for African Americans and wrote The Early History of Negroes in Business in Philadelphia published in 1913.

== Early years ==
Henry McKee Minton was born on 25 December 1870 in Columbia, South Carolina, son of Sawyer Theophilus Minton and Jennie McKee Minton, both from Philadelphia. His father was a lawyer. Henry was an only child. He took the name of his uncle Henry Minton (1811-1875), a founder of the caterer's trade guild in Philadelphia, who had become a prosperous businessman. His grandfather on his mother's side was Colonel John McKee. McKee had come to Philadelphia from Virginia in the 1840s, become a waiter and then the owner of restaurants before moving into real estate and reputedly becoming a very wealthy man.

He began to attend public schools in Washington, D.C. at the age of five. He spent two years in the Academy of Howard University, then studied at Phillips Exeter Academy in New Hampshire, graduating in 1891. He played a prominent role among the student body of Exeter. He was assistant managing editor of the Exonian and managing editor of the Literary Monthly. He was president of the debating society, co-editor of the Pean and class orator at his commencement.

Minton then spent a year studying law at the University of Pennsylvania, followed by three years studying pharmacy at the Philadelphia College of Pharmacy. He graduated with a Ph.G. degree in 1895. In 1897 he opened a drugstore, the first in Philadelphia to be operated by an African American. Colonel McKee died in April 1902. According to newspaper reports, he was "the richest coloured man in America." In his will, Colonel McKee left very little of his money to his family and other acquaintances, leaving most of his fortune to the Roman Catholic Church to build a college for orphans, despite having no prior connection to that church. After some dispute, Henry Minton obtained $25,000 from the estate, which proved much smaller than had been rumored. This was still a very large amount of money at the time. (Note: Minton's aunt, Mrs. Abbie P. Syphax of Washington, had married Douglas Syphax of Virginia. She gained $26,500 from Colonel McKee's will. When she remarried in 1904 she was reported to be "the richest colored woman in this city, and perhaps in the world.")

Leaving the drugstore, in 1902 Minton was admitted to Jefferson Medical College.

== Sigma Pi Phi ==
On 15 May 1904 Minton co-founded Sigma Pi Phi, also called the Boulé, the first Black Greek letter fraternity. The other founders were Algernon B. Jackson, Edwin C. Howard and Richard J. Warrick. At that time, fraternities were important in helping people develop contacts that would assist them in their careers. The Boulé was to grow into an exclusive and influential national organization. Minton gave the purpose as to "bind men of like qualities, tastes and attainments into close sacred union, that they might know the best of one another." He said that new members should not be "selected on the basis of brains alone, but in addition to congeniality, culture, and good fellowship, they should have behind them [at initiation] a record of accomplishments, not merely be men of promise and good education." Minton was the first grand sire archon. He helped organize the second chapter in Chicago in 1907. Sigma Pi Phi is the oldest surviving Black Greek letter fraternity, with 5,000 members as of 2008.

== Career ==
Minton graduated in 1906 as an M.D. In 1906 he became the first pharmacist for the Douglass Hospital, which had been founded in 1895 by Dr. Nathan F. Mossell and was the first hospital in Philadelphia for African Americans. Later he became secretary of the hospital's Board of Directors. A second hospital for African Americans, the Mercy Hospital, was organized by Dr. Eugene T. Hinson and other Philadelphia community leaders and opened in 1907. Minton's father was a member of the Board of Directors of the Mercy Hospital. The hospital moved to West Philadelphia in 1919. In 1920 Minton succeeded Algernon B. Jackson as superintendent on the recommendation of Dr. Hinson. He held this position for the next 24 years, during which time many interns and nurses received their training at the hospital. He was also a member of the staff of the Henry Phipps Institute, which was famous for its treatment of tuberculosis, from 1915 until he died in 1946.

Henry married Edith Wormley, daughter of the wealthy owners of a large hotel in Washington. He died in the Mercy hospital on 29 December 1946 following a heart attack. His wife had died in Washington the previous September.

== Bibliography ==
- Minton, Henry McKee (1913). The Early History of Negroes in Business in Philadelphia. The American Negro Historical Society.
- Minton, Henry McKee. The Part the Negro is Playing in the Reduction of Mortality.
- Minton, Henry McKee (April–June 1928). "Some of the Problems of Hospital Administration". Journal of the National Medical Association. 20 (2): 68–71, 77. PMC 2624554. PMID 20892258.
- Minton, Henry McKee. Syphilis of the Lungs.
- Minton, Henry McKee. Early Diagnosis of Tuberculosis.

== Notes and references ==
Notes

Citations

Sources

- Cobb, W. Montague M.D. (July 1955). "Hentry McKee Minton, 1870-1946". J Natl Med Assoc. 47 (4): 285–6. PMC 2617666. PMID 20893761.
- "Dr. Henry M. Minton, Retired Hospital Superintendent, Dies" (PDF). The New York Age. 61 (33). 4 January 1947.
- Graham, Lawrence Otis (2007-07-03). The Senator and the Socialite: The True Story of America's First Black Dynasty. HarperCollins. p. 181. ISBN 978-0-06-098513-4.
- "Henry McKee Minton, MD (Class of 1906)". Thomas Jefferson University. Archived from the original on 2010-08-07.
- Lane, Roger (1991). William Dorsey's Philadelphia and Ours: On the Past and Future of the Black City in America. Oxford University Press. ISBN 978-0-19-506566-4.
- Schaefer, Richard T. (2008-03-20). Encyclopedia of Race, Ethnicity, and Society. SAGE. p. 510. ISBN 978-1-4129-2694-2.
- "The Grand Boule' History". Ebony Magazine. 2004. Archived from the original on 2013-01-01.
