= James Wormley =

American hotelier

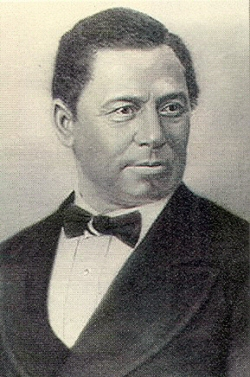
James Wormley

James Wormley (January 16, 1819 – October 18, 1884) was the owner and operator of the Wormley Hotel, which opened in Washington, D.C., in 1869. He was reported in 1865 to have been at the bedside of Abraham Lincoln when he died, but that claim has been widely disputed.

Wormley was born a free black citizen in 1819 in Washington. He and his siblings believed they were of Indian descent. Wormley started out driving a carriage for his father, Lynch Wormley (ca. 1780-1852), who owned a livery near the Willard Hotel. In this capacity he met many prominent men in the city and turned those connections into an opportunity to manage a club in the city. He gained a reputation as a fine steward and worked for some time as a steward on a Mississippi riverboat and then as steward for Reverdy Johnson.

In 1855, he opened boarding houses on I Street in Washington.

In 1871, Wormley was instrumental in getting Congress to fund the city's first public elementary school for black students, the Sumner School, and chaired the committee that oversaw its construction.

The Wormley Hotel sat at the southwest corner of 15th and H streets of the northwest quadrant of the city. The hotel was the site of the Wormley Agreement, which resolved the disputed presidential election of 1876, contested between Rutherford B. Hayes and Samuel J. Tilden, and this resolution led to the end of the Reconstruction period in the South.

Wormley died on October 18, 1884. He was interred at Columbian Harmony Cemetery in Washington, D.C. In the 1890s, his son James T. Wormley took over management of the hotel.

== Legacy ==
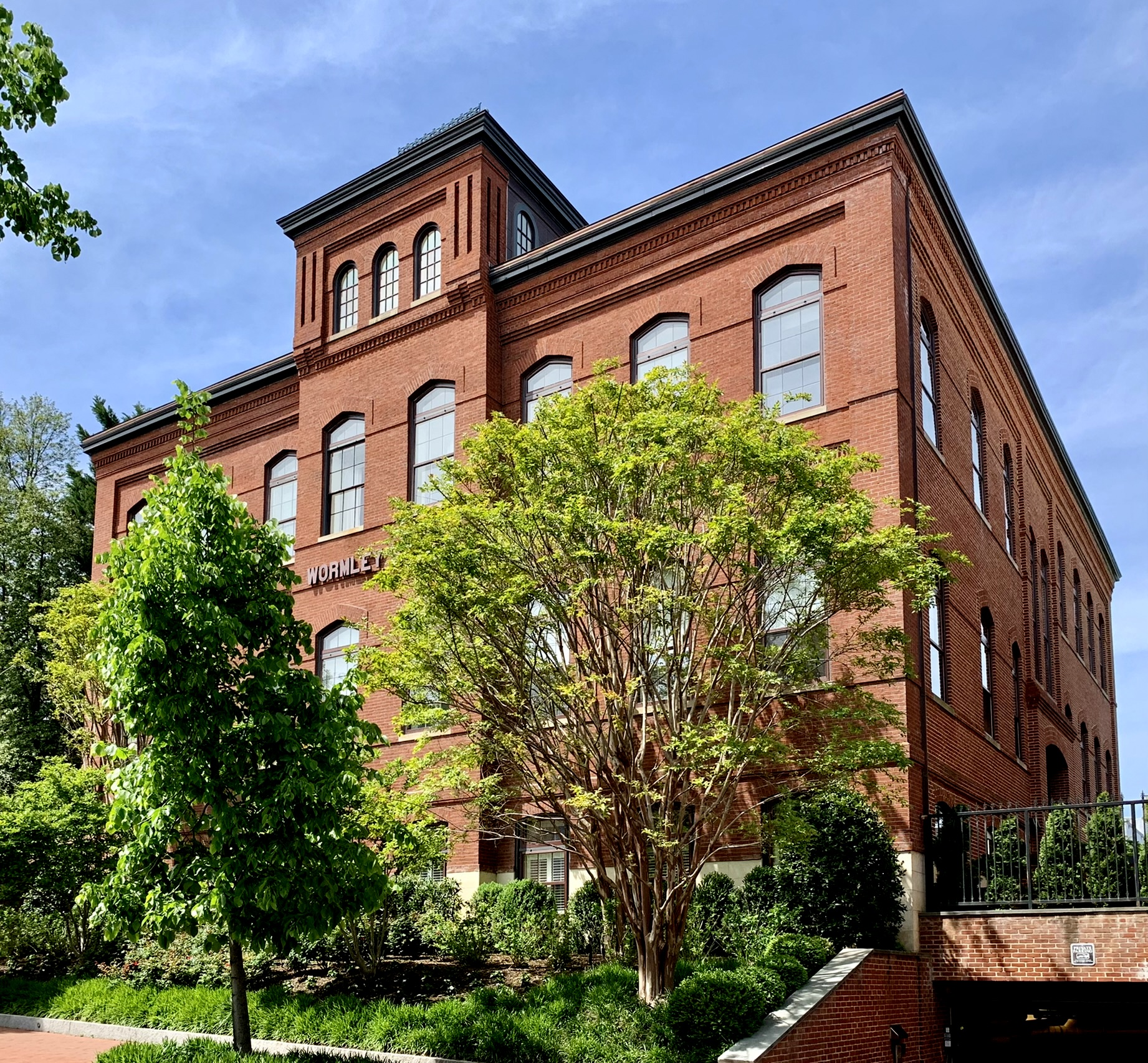
Wormley School in Georgetown

Wormley had chaired the committee that oversaw construction of an elementary school for black children in Georgetown at 3325 Prospect Street, near 33rd Street. It opened as the Wormley School in 1885. According to one source, the nearby neighborhood was mostly white, and the black children attending the school mostly came from the eastern part of Georgetown. The school closed in 1952 and became an annex for school administration. The Wormley School building also had a brief second life as a public school for special-needs students. The building was also used from 1979-1994 as a school called Prospect Learning Center. The school worked with children who had learning disabilities and some emotional issues. This building was finally closed forever as a public school in June 1994 because the District of Columbia had poorly maintained it for years. The building also had asbestos and lead-based paint. After the building was shut down in 1994, it was sold to Georgetown University for $1,500,000. It was to be renovated into student housing, but Georgetown never did anything with it, and the building and grounds sat vacant from 1994 to 2005.

The building is now home to the Wormley Row condominiums. On the site of the old parking lot and playground, houses were built to match the character and era of the neighborhood.

Wormley's life and achievements were described in the Washington Post article, "A Hotel for the History Books", by Nicholas E. Hollis on March 18, 2001. Hollis also addressed the American Bar Association and other audiences while launching a special recognition project honoring Wormley.
