= St. Mary's Episcopal Church (Washington, D.C.) =

Historic church in Washington, D.C., United States

- U.S. National Register of Historic Places
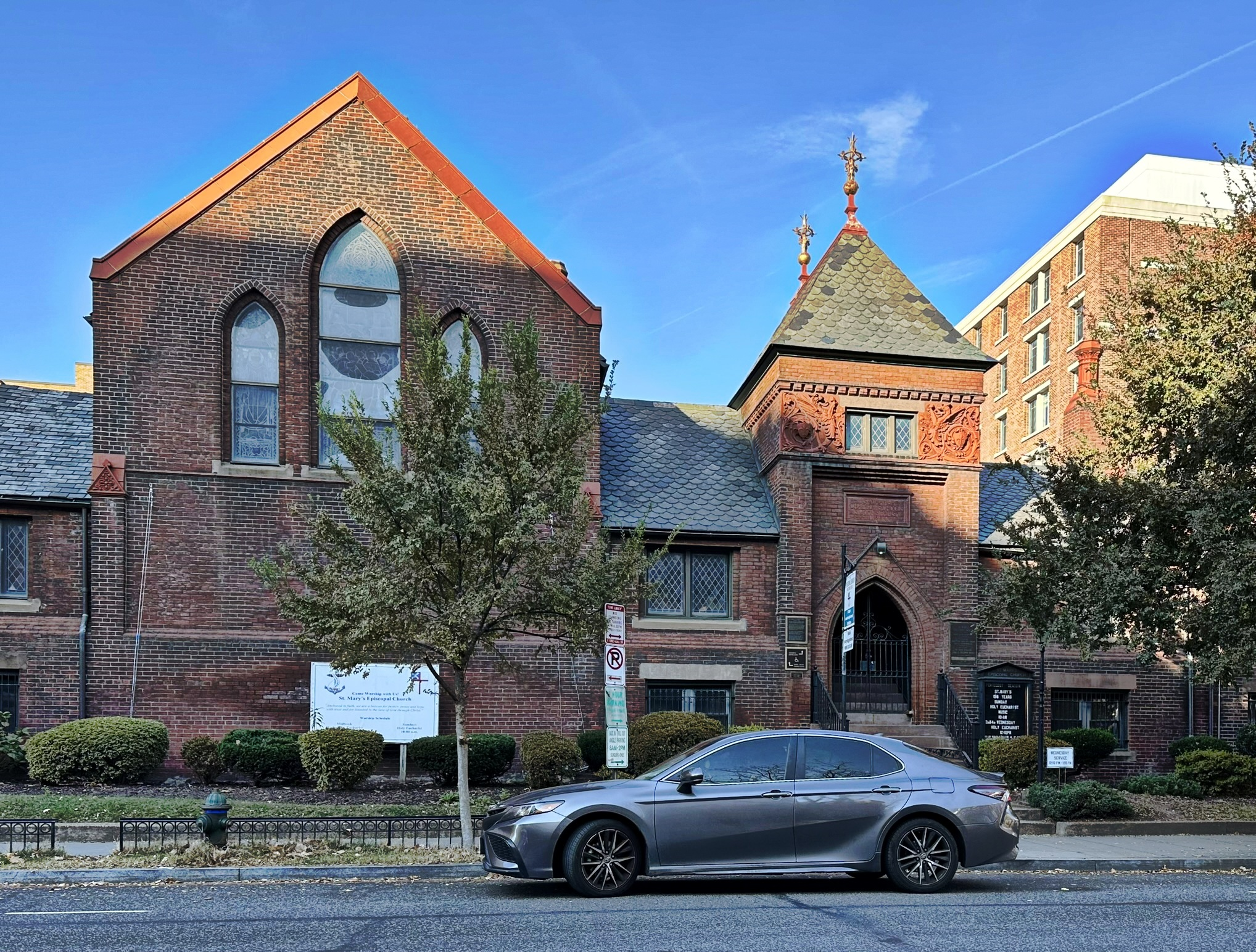
- Saint Mary's Episcopal Church in 2023

- Location within Central Washington, D.C.
- Location: 730 23rd Street, N.W. Washington, D.C.
- Coordinates: 38°53′56″N 77°3′14″W
- Built: 1887
- NRHP reference No.: 73002118
- Added to NRHP: April 2, 1973

St. Mary's Episcopal Church, also known as St. Mary's, Foggy Bottom or St. Mary's Chapel, is a historic Episcopal church located at 730 23rd Street, N.W. in the Foggy Bottom neighborhood of Washington, D.C. It was added to the National Register of Historic Places in 1973. The church reported 103 members in 2015 and 96 members from 2019 to 2023; no membership statistics were reported in 2024 parochial reports. Plate and pledge income reported for the congregation in 2024 was $157,778. Average Sunday attendance (ASA) in 2024 was 47 persons.

== History ==
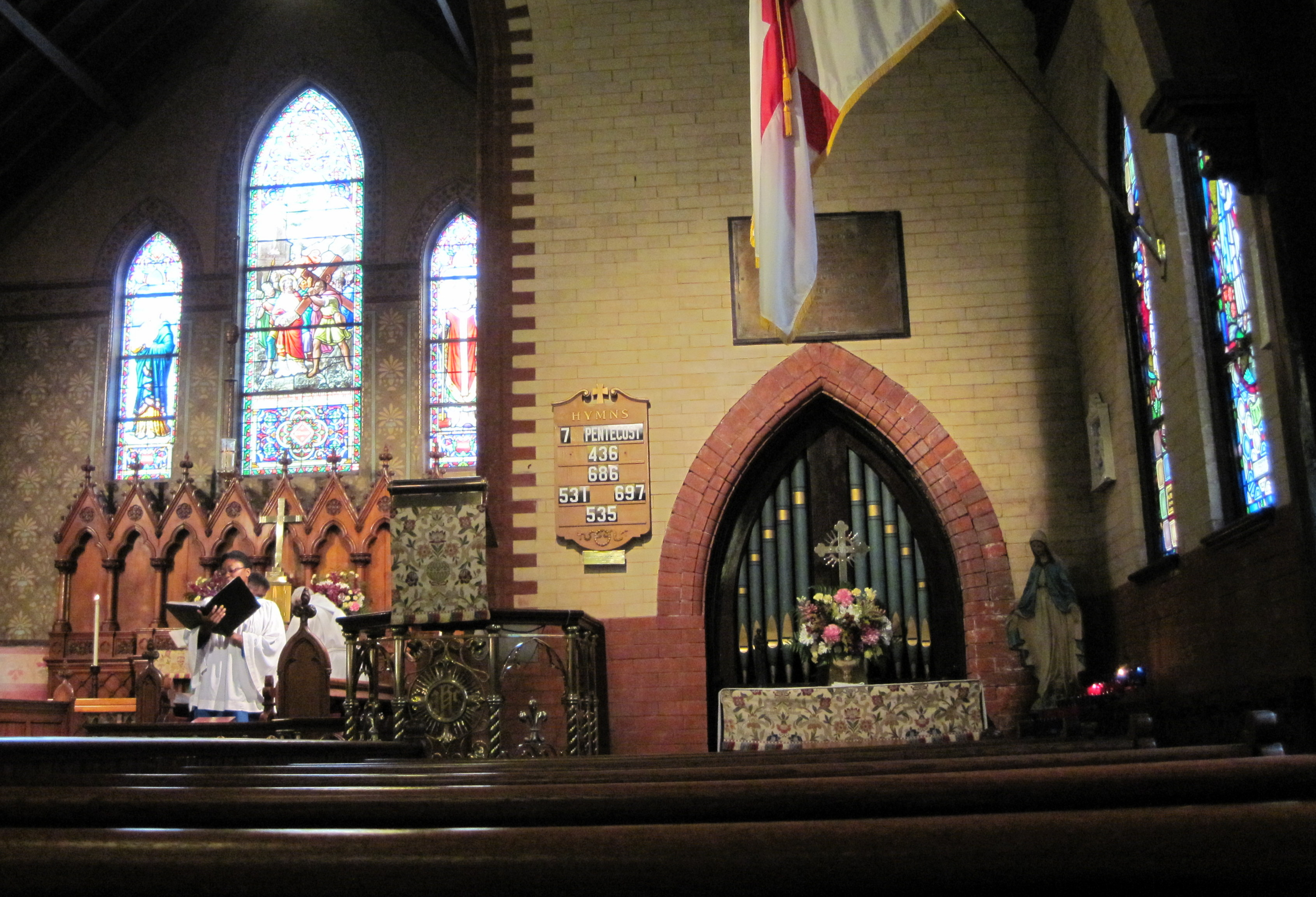
The church interior

Saint Mary's was founded in 1867 by former members of The Church of the Epiphany, located in Downtown, Washington, D.C. St. Mary's was the city's first African American Episcopal congregation. The congregation originally met in a Civil War barracks building known as St. Mary's Chapel for Colored People with the first Morning Prayer service held on June 9, 1867.

== Architecture ==
Designed by architects Renwick, Aspinwall & Russell in 1887, the building is an example of Gothic Revival architecture. Decorative features include a timber roof and Tiffany glass windows.

== See also ==
- National Register of Historic Places listings in the District of Columbia
