= Colored Episcopal Mission =

Obsolete Anglican term used by the Episcopal Church in the United States of America

Colored Episcopal Mission is an obsolete Anglican term used by the Episcopal Church in the United States of America. The term was coined in the 19th century.

The Episcopal Church fostered distinct African-American religious communities during the 19th and early 20th centuries. Parishes founded by Black congregants during this era were designated as Colored Episcopal Missions. The Church's approach during this period simultaneously encouraged the development of separate Black religious life and limited African Americans' voice and representation in church governance. Parish status was granted once the mission achieved financial independence from the diocese. It was common for missions to remain in this transitional phase for an extended period before attaining parish status.

The first established Colored Episcopal Mission is St. Thomas Episcopal in Philadelphia, Pennsylvania. It was established in 1794.

== Archives ==
Established in 2003, the Virginia Theological Seminary Archives and the Historical Society of the Episcopal Church jointly manage the African American Episcopal Historical Collection. The collection contains the personal papers, institutional records, oral histories and photographs of many historically black missions.
