= List of Perelman School of Medicine at the University of Pennsylvania alumni =

This is a list of notable alumni of the Perelman School of Medicine at the University of Pennsylvania. Graduates from before 1922 can be confirmed within the University of Pennsylvania alumni catalogue. Graduates from 1840 and before (and honorary degree holders) can also be found in the 1839 (with 1840 addendum) catalogue.

== Alumni (award winners and summary of elected officials) ==
=== Nobel laureates ===
- Michael S. Brown (born April 13, 1941) Penn Med Class of 1965, Nobel laureate who won the Nobel Prize in Physiology or Medicine in 1985 for describing the regulation of cholesterol metabolism and is also the 1985 recipient of the Albert Lasker Award for Basic Medical Research
- Gerald Edelman: (July 1, 1929 – May 17, 2014) Penn Med Class of 1954, biologist who shared the 1972 Nobel Prize in Physiology or Medicine for work on the immune system via research resulting in discovery of the structure of antibody molecules and was founder and director of The Neurosciences Institute
- Stanley B. Prusiner: (born May 28, 1942) Penn College Class of 1964 and Penn Med Class of 1968, is an American neurologist and biochemist who discovered prions, a class of infectious self-reproducing pathogens primarily or solely composed of protein resulting in him being awarded the Albert Lasker Award for Basic Medical Research in 1994 and the Nobel Prize in Physiology or Medicine in 1997 for research on prion diseases developed by him and his team of experts (among them D. E. Garfin, D. P. Stites, W. J. Hadlow, C. M. Eklund)
- Gregg Semenza: (born July 12, 1956), Penn Med Class of 1982, Professor of Genetic Medicine at the Johns Hopkins School of Medicine where he serves as the director of the vascular program at the Institute for Cell Engineering, is a 2016 recipient of the Albert Lasker Award for Basic Medical Research, is known for his discovery of HIF-1, which allows cancer cells to adapt to oxygen-poor environments, and shared the 2019 Nobel Prize in Physiology or Medicine for "discoveries of how cells sense and adapt to oxygen availability"

=== Medal of Honor recipients ===
- William R. D. Blackwood (May 12, 1838 – April 26, 1922) University of Pennsylvania School of Medicine (Class of 1862): wrote thesis on gastro-intestinal digestion and in September 1862 (mere months after having his thesis approved) enlisted into the 149th Pennsylvania Infantry as an Assistant Surgeon and within a year was promoted to Chief Surgeon of 48th Pennsylvania Infantry such that during the Third Battle of Petersburg on April 2, 1865, he was in position to assist a number of seriously wounded soldiers to leave the battlefield at risk to his own life resulting in his being awarded the Medal of Honor, United States' highest award for bravery during combat, for his bravery and heroics
- Joseph K. Corson (November 22, 1836 – July 24, 1913) University of Pennsylvania School of Medicine (Class of 1863): awarded Medal of Honor, the nation's highest award for bravery, during combat at Battle of Bristoe Station in Virginia on October 14, 1863, by helping to rescue (at risk to his own life) a severely wounded soldier left between the lines while under Confederate artillery fire

=== Summary of alumni elected to federal or state governmental offices ===
As detailed below and in University of Pennsylvania Archives, at least (a) 41 Penn Med alumni served in the United States House of Representatives representing 12 states, (b) 5 Penn Med alumni served in the United States Senate representing 4 states, (c) 9 Penn Med alumni served in 7 different state legislatures, (d) 3 Penn Med alumni served as governors of 3 different states, and (e) 1 Penn Med alumnus was elected (and served) as president of the United States.

== Alumni in chronological order of year they were due to graduate ==
=== 18th century ===
- John Archer, (May 5, 1741 – September 28, 1810) Class of 1768: first person to receive a medical degree from an American school, practiced law in Harford County, Maryland,member of the Revolutionary committee 1774–1776, raised a military company during the American Revolutionary War, member of the first state constitutional convention of 1776, served in the Maryland House of Delegates 1777–1779, volunteer aide-de-camp to General Anthony Wayne at Stony Point, in 1779 was made a captain and subsequently a major in the Continental Army, elected as a Democratic-Republican to the Seventh, Eighth, and Ninth Congresses, serving from March 4, 1801, until March 3, 1807, as a U.S. Congressman in sixth district of Maryland
- David Jackson, (1747 – September 17, 1801) Class of 1768: appointed to raise funds as a quartermaster by managing the lottery to benefit the American Revolutionary War for the Continental Army, served as paymaster for the Pennsylvania militia, which he resigned to serve in the field with the militia as an army surgeon, served as Pennsylvania delegate to the Sixth Congress under Articles of Confederation (which met from November 7, 1785, through November 2, 1786), and was a member of the American Philosophical Society
- David Ramsay (April 2, 1749 – May 8, 1815), Class of 1773, 1780 (Hon. M.D.): served from 1776 to 1783 as a member of the South Carolina legislature, served with the South Carolina militia as a field surgeon during the Siege of Charleston in 1780 and was captured by the British and imprisoned for nearly a year at St. Augustine, Florida, served as a delegate to the Continental Congress from 1782 to 1786 (including a stint acting as president during sixth Congress of the Confederation when president John Hancock was absent), served three terms in the South Carolina Senate (including time as its president), and is considered one of the first major historians (in the European Enlightenment tradition) of the American Revolution era
- Caspar Wistar, (September 13, 1761 – January 22, 1818) Class of 1782: (also received medical degree from the University of Edinburgh in 1786 where he was elected president of the Royal Medical Society of Edinburgh), appointed (a) professor of chemistry from 1789 till 1792, (b) adjunct professor of anatomy, midwifery, and surgery from 1793 until 1808, and (c) chair of anatomy from 1808 until his death in 1818 (all at Penn Medical schools or their predecessors), elected (1) Fellow American College of Physicians in 1787 (2) Fellow of the American Academy of Arts and Sciences in 1803, (3) president of the American Philosophical Society in 1815 and (4) President of the Society for the Abolition of Slavery
- Adam Seybert (May 16, 1773 – May 2, 1825), Class of 1793: elected as (a) member of the American Philosophical Society in 1797, (b) Fellow of the American Academy of Arts and Sciences in 1824, (c) Democratic-Republican to the Eleventh Congress (to fill the vacancy caused by the resignation of Benjamin Say), Twelfth, Thirteenth Congresses. He was again elected to the Fifteenth Congresses of the United States House of Representatives, chairman of the United States House Committee on Revisal and Unfinished Business
- William Henry Harrison, (February 9, 1773 – April 4, 1841) Class of 1793: Considered a non-graduate alumnus of the Class of 1793, Harrison only spent a semester at Penn. He studied chemistry under professor Benjamin Rush, and anatomy and surgery under William Shippen. He would go onto join the army and have a successful career there leading to numerous government positions including the President of the United States.
- Lewis Condict, (March 3, 1772 – May 26, 1862) Class of 1794: sheriff of Morris County from 1801 to 1803, member of the commission for adjusting the boundary line between the States of New York and New Jersey in 1804, member of the New Jersey General Assembly from 1805 to 1809 (serving as speaker of the Assembly in 1808 and 1809), elected as a Democratic-Republican to the Twelfth, Thirteenth, and Fourteenth Congresses, serving from March 4, 1811, to March 3, 1817, and again elected as a Democratic-Republican to the Seventeenth Congress and Eighteenth Congress as United States representative from New Jersey to the U.S. Congress, trustee of Princeton College, and served as the 24th president of the Medical Society of New Jersey in 1816 and 1819
- Charles Caldwell, (May 14, 1772 – July 9, 1853) Class of 1796: founder of the Louisville Medical Institute considered one of the ancestors of University of Louisville School of Medicine
- John Claiborne, (January 26, 1778 – October 9, 1808) Class of 1798: elected representative for Virginia's 17th congressional for Virginia's 17th of the U.S. Congress for two terms from 1805 to 1807 (Ninth Congress) and 1807 to 1808 (Tenth Congress, for which term he did not complete as he died on October 8, 1808)
- John Hahn, (October 30, 1776 – February 26, 1823) Class of 1798: elected to U.S. House of Representatives from Pennsylvania's 2nd district to the Fourteenth U.S. Congress (March 4, 1815 - March 3, 1817)

=== 19th century ===
- Nathaniel Chapman, Class of 1800: first President of the American Medical Association
- William Wyatt Bibb, Class of 1801: Georgia representative to the U.S. Congress, U.S. Senate, and 1st Governor of Alabama
- Hedge Thompson, Class of 1802: New Jersey representative to the U.S. Congress
- William Darlington, Class of 1804: War of 1812 major of a volunteer regiment, Pennsylvania representative to the U.S. Congress
- John Floyd, Class of 1804: 25th Governor of Virginia, Virginia representative to the U.S. Congress
- George Edward Mitchell, Class of 1805: Maryland representative to the U.S. Congress
- William Potts Dewees, Class of 1806: Obstetrician and author of System of Midwifery, a standard reference book on Obstetrics
- William P. C. Barton, Class of 1808: author of A Treatise Containing a Plan for the Internal Organization and Government of Marine Hospitals in the U.S.... and Dean of Jefferson Medical College
- Reuben D. Mussey, Class of 1809: in 1862, wrote the first definitive history of tobacco documenting its dangers
- Samuel A. Cartwright, (November 3, 1793 – May 2, 1863) did not graduate: improved sanitary conditions during the American Civil War and was honored for his investigations into yellow fever and Asiatic cholera
- Arnold Naudain, Class of 1810: served in the War of 1812 as surgeon of the Delaware Regiment, U.S. Senator from Delaware
- Henry H. Chambers, Class of 1811: U.S. Senator from Alabama
- George Hayward, Class of 1812: Harvard Medical School professor; performed groundbreaking surgery and use of anesthesia
- Joel Barlow Sutherland, Class of 1812: Pennsylvania representative to the U.S. Congress, served in the War of 1812 as assistant surgeon to the "Junior Artillerists of Philadelphia"
- George William Crump, Class of 1812 (started in 1808 but did not graduate): member of the United States House of Representatives in the 19th United States Congress and the U.S. Ambassador to Chile and reported to be the first student arrested for running naked (circa 1804) on campus (through Lexington, Virginia), and such arrest is the United States' first recorded incident of streaking
- Clement Finley, Class of 1818: 10th Surgeon General of the U.S. Army
- John M. Patton, Class of 1818: Virginia representative to the U.S. Congress
- George Bacon Wood, Class of 1818: Compiled first Dispensatory of the United States (1833); president of both the College of Physicians of Philadelphia and American Medical Association
- George McClellan, Class of 1819: founder of Jefferson Medical College, now Thomas Jefferson University
- John Kearsley Mitchell Class of 1819, in 1827, elected to the American Philosophical Society, in 1833 was appointed professor of chemistry at the Franklin Institute from 1841 to 1858, professor of the theory and practice of medicine at Jefferson Medical College, and was also the father of American physician and writer Silas Weir Mitchell
- John Light Atlee, Class of 1820: one of the organizers of, and past president of the American Medical Association
- William Maclay Awl, matric. 1819, did not graduate: acting superintendent of the Ohio "State Hospital," president of the Association of Superintendents of Asylums for the Insane of the United States and Canada, one of the founders of the Ohio State Medical Society
- John Ker, Class of 1822: surgeon in the War of 1812 and the Creek War, plantation owner, co-founder of the Mississippi Colonization Society, former vice presidents of the American Colonization Society
- William Alexander Caruthers, Class of 1823: novelist, his better known works including The Cavaliers of Virginia, or the Recluse of Jamestown and The Knights of the Horse Shoe
- George Nicholas Eckert, Class of 1824: Pennsylvania representative (Whig) to the U.S. Congress
- Wilmer Worthington, Class of 1825: Speaker of the Pennsylvania State Senate (1869)
- Francis Julius LeMoyne, Class of 1825: (matriculated at Penn Med in 1821 but graduated from Jefferson Medical College: creator of the first crematory in the United States; abolitionist; founder of Washington, Pennsylvania's first public library (Citizen's Library); benefactor to LeMoyne–Owen College in Tennessee; his family house was utilized as part of the Underground Railroad and still stands today as a museum near the campus of Washington & Jefferson College in Pennsylvania
- John Milton Bernhisel, Class of 1827: Utah delegate to the U.S. Congress
- Joseph Pancoast, Class of 1828: surgeon and department chairman at Jefferson Medical College; author of A Treatise on Operative Surgery
- Edson B. Olds, Class of 1829: Ohio representative to the U.S. Congress
- Robert Rentoul Reed, Class of 1829: Pennsylvania representative to the U.S. Congress
- William Ruschenberger, Class of 1830: surgeon for the United States Navy, president of the Academy of Natural Sciences of Philadelphia 1870–1882, and president of the College of Physicians of Philadelphia 1879–1883
- Meriwether Lewis Anderson, Class of 1831: elected to the Virginia Legislature
- Greene Washington Caldwell, Class of 1831: assistant surgeon in the U.S. Army, North Carolina representative to the U.S. Congress
- Francis Mallory, Class of 1831: Virginia representative to the U.S. Congress, U.S. Naval officer
- Thomas R. Potts, Class of 1831: first mayor of St. Paul, Minnesota
- Thomas Story Kirkbride, Class of 1832: founder of the Association of Medical Superintendents of American Institutions for the Insane (AMSAII)
- Samuel Carey Bradshaw, Class of 1833: Opposition Party member of the U.S. House of Representatives from Pennsylvania
- John Carmichael Jenkins, Class of 1833: general physician, horticulturalist and plantation owner
- Lucius Israel Barber, Class of 1835: Speaker of the Wisconsin Territorial House of Representatives in 1839, member of the Legislature serving in the Wisconsin Territorial Council, wrote about the history of Simsbury, Connecticut
- Norman Eddy, Class of 1835: Colonel of the 48th Indiana Infantry during the American Civil War, Indiana representative to the U.S. Congress
- Percy Walker, Class of 1835: Alabama representative to the U.S. Congress
- Alfred Stillé, Class of 1836: researched and published the differences typhus and typhoid fever along with widely used texts on medicine and medical education
- Pliny Earle, Class of 1837: founder of the American Medical Association, the New York Academy of Medicine, the Association of Medical Superintendents of American Institutions for the Insane, and the New England Psychological Society
- Samuel Lilly, Class of 1837: New Jersey representative to the U.S. Congress
- David Hayes Agnew, Class of 1838: surgeon and author of The Principles and Practice of Surgery
- Henry Marchmore Shaw, Class of 1838: North Carolina representative to the U.S. Congress
- Thomas Dunn English, Class of 1839: writer, New Jersey representative to the U.S. Congress
- Crawford Long, Class of 1839: surgeon and pharmacist; first person to use inhaled ether as an anesthetic
- William A. Newell, Class of 1839: New Jersey representative to the U.S. Congress, created the Newell Act, which created the U.S. Life-Saving Service
- George R. Dennis, Class of 1842: U.S. Senator from Pennsylvania
- Isaiah D. Clawson, Class of 1843: Opposition Party and Republican member of the U.S. House of Representatives from New Jersey
- Thomas Buchecker Cooper, Class of 1843: Pennsylvania representative to the U.S. Congress
- Robert Murray, Class of 1843: Surgeon General of the United States Army
- Alexander Keith Marshall, Class of 1844: Kentucky representative to the U.S. Congress
- John H. Stringfellow, Class of 1845, Kansas pioneer; Confederate Army surgeon
- Jonathan T. Updegraff, Class of 1845: Ohio representative to the U.S. Congress
- James Dale Strawbridge, Class of 1847: Pennsylvania representative to the U.S. Congress
- Samuel Hollingsworth Stout, Class of 1848: Confederate surgeon, teacher, slaveholder, farmer
- William Wallace Anderson, Class of 1849: designed the Borough House Plantation and Church of the Holy Cross (Stateburg, South Carolina), now National Historic Landmarks
- Samuel W. Crawford, Class of 1850: U.S. Army surgeon and a Union general in the American Civil War
- John Daniel Clardy, Class of 1851: Democratic member of the U.S. House of Representatives from Kentucky
- Ephraim L. Acker, Class of 1852: Democratic member of the U.S. House of Representatives from Pennsylvania
- John H. Pugh, Class of 1852: New Jersey representative to the U.S. Congress
- Joseph Janvier Woodward, Class of 1853: 34th President of the American Medical Association, pioneer in photomicrography, surgeon, performed the autopsies of Abraham Lincoln and John Wilkes Booth, and contributed two volumes to the Medical and Surgical History of the War of the Rebellion
- Horatio C Wood Jr. [sic], Class of 1862: author of the 1874 work Treatise on Therapeutics, Special Prize from American Philosophical Society for his 1869 paper Research upon American Hemp, 1871 Warren Prize from Massachusetts General Hospital for Experimental Researches in the Physiological Action of Amyl Nitrite, 1872 Boylston Prize for Thermic Fever or Sunstroke, nephew of George Bacon Wood
- Charles Karsner Mills, Class of 1869: founded the first neurology department in a general hospital in the United States
- William Pepper, Class of 1864: former Provost of the University of Pennsylvania and founder of Philadelphia's first free public library
- Charles Conrad Abbott, Class of 1865: surgeon in the Union Army during the American Civil War
- Joseph Jorgensen, Class of 1865: Virginia representative to the U.S. Congress
- Hiram R. Burton, Class of 1868: Republican member of the U.S. House of Representatives from Delaware, Delaware Secretary of State
- William Preston Snyder, Class of 1873: president pro tempore of the Pennsylvania Senate and Pennsylvania Auditor General
- Caleb R. Layton, Class of 1876: Delaware representative to the U.S. Congress
- Francis Xavier Dercum, Class of 1877: first described the disease Adiposis dolorosa (Dercum's disease), treated President Woodrow Wilson in 1919
- Howard Atwood Kelly (February 20, 1858 – January 12, 1943) Class of 1877 nation's "first" gynecologist (mentored by Sir William Osler, 1st Baronet, FRS FRCP who together were half of the "Big Four" founding professors at the Johns Hopkins Hospital in Baltimore, Maryland) who is credited with establishing gynecology as a specialty by developing new surgical approaches to gynecological diseases and pathological research and also developed several medical innovations, including the improved cystoscope, Kelly's clamp, Kelly's speculum, and Kelly's forceps
- Nathan Francis Mossell: (July 27, 1856 – October 27, 1946) Class of 1882: the first African-American graduate of Penn Med who did post-graduate training at hospitals in Philadelphia and London, first black physician elected as member of the Philadelphia County Medical Society and was founder of Frederick Douglass Memorial Hospital and the Philadelphia branch of the NAACP
- Barton Cooke Hirst, Class of 1883: obstetrician, founded Penn's Maternity Hospital in 1892
- Lewis Heisler Ball, Class of 1885: Republican member of the U.S. Senate from Delaware
- William Summerill Vanneman, Class of 1888, medical missionary in Tabriz, Iran and chairman of the Tabriz mission relief committee during the Armenian genocide and Persian famine
- Alfred Stengel, Class of 1889: President of the American College of Physicians, one of the students that commissioned Thomas Eakins' The Agnew Clinic
- Tom Cahill, left 1891, did not graduate: played one season in Major League Baseball for the Louisville Colonels, planned to finish medical degree but died from an injury before being able to do so

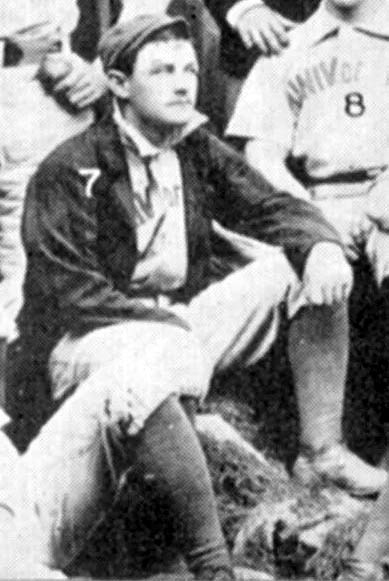
A portion of Penn baseball team photo (circa 1890) of Penn baseball player, Thomas H. Cahill (Penn Medical School Class of 1891).

- Albert C. Barnes (January 2, 1872 – July 24, 1951) Penn Med Class of 1892: inventor of Argyrol which saved millions of children from being born blind and protected United States soldiers against venereal diseases; founder of the Barnes Foundation, one of the most valuable art collections in the world, which were valued in March 2010 at $25 billion
- Leonard N. Boston, Class of 1896: described Boston's sign in Graves' disease
- Jesse Hall "Pete" Allen, Class of 1897: Major League Baseball player for the Cleveland Spiders, assistant professor of proctology at Jefferson Medical College, Penn varsity baseball coach (1896 and 1897)
- Frank Sexton, Class of 1898: Major League Baseball player for the Boston Beaneaters and college baseball coach
- John H. Outland, Class of 1899: completed his medical education, (after starting at University of Kansas), where he became one of the few men ever to win All-American football honors as both lineman and the backfield player and was picked by Walter Camp as a first-team All-American in 1897, as a tackle, and in 1898 as a halfback, captain of the 1898 team, voted "Most Popular Man" in the entire University of Pennsylvania
- Pleasant Williams Kittrell, attended for two years but did not graduate, physician, planter and politician

=== 20th century ===
- Charles Browne, Class of 1900: New Jersey representative to the U.S. Congress
- Josiah McCracken, Class of 1901: American football player, Olympic medalist, and founder and president of the University Medical School in Canton, China (1907–1913) and dean of the Pennsylvania Medical School of St. John's University in Shanghai (1914–1942)
- Donald Guthrie (physician), Class of 1905: founder of the Guthrie Medical Group. See Guthrie Robert Packer Hospital.
- Arthur Percy Noyes, Class of 1906: president of the Philadelphia Psychiatric Society and the Pennsylvania Psychiatric Society, former superintendent of Rhode Island's state mental hospital
- William Carlos Williams, Class of 1906: poet, pediatrician, and general practitioner
- Leo C. Mundy, Class of 1908: Pennsylvania state senator
- Archibald E. Olpp, Class of 1908: New Jersey representative to the U.S. Congress, served as first lieutenant in the U.S. Medical Corps during the First World War
- Isaac Starr, Class of 1920: developed the first practical ballistocardiograph; 1957 Albert Lasker Award, 1967 Kober Medal of the Association of American Physicians, 1977 Burger Medal of the Free University of Amsterdam
- John P. Turner, Class of 1921, surgeon and staff president of the Frederick Douglass Memorial Hospital and Training School
- Horace Hodes, Class of 1931: pediatrician, isolated rotavirus
- William Holmes Crosby Jr., Class of 1940: one of the founding fathers of modern hematology
- Franklin David Murphy, Class of 1941: 9th Chancellor of the University of Kansas and 3rd Chancellor of the University of California, Los Angeles
- James D. Weaver, Class of 1944: Pennsylvania representative to the U.S. Congress, colonel in the U.S. Air Force
- Helen Octavia Dickens, Class of 1945 - graduate school: OB-gyn, first African-American woman to be admitted to the American College of Surgeons, director of the Department of Obstetrics and Gynecology at Mercy Douglass hospital, sexually transmitted infection researcher
- Leon Eisenberg, Class of 1946: accomplished psychiatrist, completed the first outcome study of autistic children in adolescence, Chief of Psychiatry at Johns Hopkins Hospital and the Massachusetts General Hospital
- William H. Harris, Class of 1951: developed the Harris Hip Score, performed the world's first successful total hip replacement in a patient with a total congenital dislocation of the hip, developed the first effective cement-free acetabular component
- Gerald Edelman, Class of 1954: 1972 Nobel Prize in Physiology or Medicine for discovering the structure and mode of action of antibodies; founder and director of The Neurosciences Institute; also noted for his theory of secondary consciousness
- Maria New, Class of 1954: expert in congenital adrenal hyperplasia, former Chief of Pediatric Endocrinology at Cornell University Medical College, first to publish mutations on the 11β-hydroxysteroid dehydrogenase type 2 enzyme
- Alton Sutnick, Class of 1954: made the seminal discovery leading to a hepatitis B vaccine, first to describe hepatitis C, Dean of the Medical College of Pennsylvania
- Walter Bortz II, Class of 1955: one of America's leading scientific experts on aging
- Liebe Sokol Diamond, Class of 1955: first female resident (orthopedic surgery) at the Hospital of the University of Pennsylvania, co-founder of the Pediatric Orthopedic Society of North America, inductee of the Maryland Women's Hall of Fame
- David E. Kuhl, Class of 1955: 2009 Japan Prize, best known for his pioneering work in positron emission tomography
- Myint Myint Khin, Class of 1955: First female chair of Department of Medicine in Myanmar; writer on public health and medicine
- Frank A. Oski, Class of 1958: chair of pediatrics at Johns Hopkins School of Medicine, founder and editor of the journal Contemporary Pediatrics, co-wrote the first textbook focused on blood disorders in newborns, editor of Principles and Practice of Pediatrics
- San Baw, Class of 1958: pioneer of "the use of ivory hip prostheses to replace ununited fractures of the neck of the femur"
- James A. Zimble, Class of 1959: 30th surgeon general of the United States Navy, former president of the Uniformed Services University of the Health Sciences
- Donald Tashkin, Class of 1961, professor of Medicine and Director, Pulmonary Function Laboratories, David Geffen School of Medicine at UCLA
- Paul Makler Sr., Penn Med Class of 1964 and Penn undergraduate Class of 1944: fenced for the University of Pennsylvania Quakers, competed in the individual and team épée events at the 1952 Summer Olympics in Helsinki, won a silver medal in the team foil event at the 1955 Pan American Games, won an Amateur Fencers League of America (AFLA) national team épée title in 1956, president of the American Fencing Association in 1962
- Michael Stuart Brown, Class of 1966: 1985 Nobel Prize in Physiology or Medicine, 1957 Albert Lasker Award
- Bennett Lorber, Class of 1968: professional artist and infectious disease specialist, 2013 Jane F. Desforges Distinguished Teacher Award from the American College of Physicians, 2003 Alexander Fleming Lifetime Achievement Award from the Infectious Diseases Society of America
- Marvin Makinen, Class of 1968: Biophysicist and human rights advocate at the University of Chicago
- Stanley B. Prusiner, Class of 1968: 1997 Nobel Prize in Physiology or Medicine
- Patricia A. Gabow, Class of 1969: professor emerita, University of Colorado School of Medicine, Division of Renal Diseases; CEO, Denver Health
- Arnold Klein, Class of 1971: Beverly Hills dermatologist and television/news medical expert
- Ann Arvin, Class of 1972: vice provost and dean of research at Stanford University
- Paul Makler Jr., Class of 1972: Olympic fencer
- Robert Barchi, Class of 1973: 20th president of Rutgers University, former President of Thomas Jefferson Univ; former Provost of Penn
- Marie Bernard, Class of 1976: deputy director of the National Institute on Aging at the National Institutes of Health
- Dana Beyer, Class of 1978: executive director of Gender Rights Maryland
- Mitchell J. Blutt, Class of 1982: founder and CEO of the healthcare investment firm Consonance Capital, former Executive Partner of J.P. Morgan Partners, Clinical Assistant Professor of Medicine at Weill Cornell Medical College and the Graduate School of Medical Sciences of Cornell University
- Richard Besser, Class of 1986: ABC News medical editor, former acting director for the CDC and the ATSDR
- Mehmet Oz, Class of 1986: earned not only MD from University of Pennsylvania School of Medicine but also MBA from Penn's Wharton School; received Harvard University Captain's Athletic Award for leadership as a safety on Harvard Football team was class president and then student body president during medical school, cardiothoracic surgeon and host of The Dr. Oz Show
- Donald M. O'Rourke, Class of 1987: John Templeton Jr., M.D. Professor in Neurosurgery, Perelman School of Medicine at the University of Pennsylvania
- David Agus, Class of 1991: co-founder of Navigenics, a personal genetic testing company, and Oncology.com
- Joshua A. Hirsch, Class of 1991: physician, medical researcher, academic and expert on interventional pain management
- David Langer, Class of 1991: neurosurgeon and chair of neurosurgery at Lenox Hill Hospital
- Reginald Ho, Class of 1993: cardiologist, star kicker on the 1988 Notre Dame Fighting Irish football team
- Bruce Lerman: cardiologist; chief of the Division of Cardiology and Director of the Cardiac Electrophysiology Laboratory at Weill Cornell Medicine and the New York Presbyterian Hospital

=== 21st century ===
- Rajiv Shah, Class of 2001: former director of USAID, formerly at Bill and Melinda Gates Foundation; alumnus of the Wharton School; president, Rockefeller Foundation
- Wendy Sue Swanson, Class of 2003: pediatrician, social media activist, author of Seattle Mama Doc blog
- Emily Kramer-Golinkoff, Class of 2009 (Masters in BioEthics (MBE): researcher, health activist, and cystic-fibrosis patient, founder of nonprofit Emily's Entourage
- Hilary D. Marston, Class of 2009: former chief medical officer of the Food and Drug Administration
- David Fajgenbaum, Class of 2013: immunology researcher, author, and co-founder of Castleman Disease Collaborative Network
