= Carleton University Students' Association =

Undergraduate student union at Carleton University, Ottawa

- Motto: Your Student Association
- Institution: Carleton University
- Location: Ottawa, Ontario, Canada
- Established: 1942
- Vice presidents: Aryan Singh, Amy Kopytskiy, Nathan Harlan, Georgia Anderson
- Members: 27 000
- Website: www.cusaonline.ca

The Carleton University Students' Association (or CUSA) is a non-profit corporation that represents the undergraduate students at Carleton University in Ottawa, Ontario, Canada.

== Governance ==
=== Executive ===
Executive members of CUSA are elected yearly. The executive is responsible for improving CUSA services, working on the issues important to you, and carrying out the daily work of the Association. The 2026/27 executive members are:

- President/CEO – Maxwell Heroux (Removed from his position on September 28th, 2026, following an in-camera council meeting.)
- VP Finance-Treasurer – Aryan Singh
- VP Internal – Amy Kopytskiy
- VP Student Issues – Nathan Harlan
- VP Student Life – Georgia Anderson

=== New Governance Model ===
In the October 2021 meeting, CUSA Council adopted the new governance structure on the advice of the Democratic Reform Committee and CUSA's lawyers to comply with new provincial legislation and to expand decision making responsibilities and ethical safeguards.

==== Democratic Reform Committee ====
In October 2021, the CUSA Council was presented with the Democratic Reform Committee's Final Report. Starting 11 August 2021, the Democratic Reform Committee (DRC) met twice every week with the goal of restoring student trust in CUSA that had been lost in recent years. Following the 2021 CUSA General Election, the 2021/2022 Executive committed to the project of democratic reform and struck this Committee. The Committee was composed of three students at large, five councilors, three non-voting CUSA Staff, one volunteer notetaker, and one member of the CUSA Executive.

The Committee began by consulting with John McNair, CUSA's lawyer, who answered questions from Committee members about the state of CUSA's Governance. Mr. McNair's testimony reinforced the harsh reality: CUSA's bylaws and governing structures were seriously flawed and vulnerable to malicious lawsuits to the detriment of CUSA and the student body. Mr. McNair's testimony emphasized the urgent need for full and total reform of CUSA governing structures – not only because reform would improve CUSA's democratic functioning, but because such modifications were vital to the sustenance of CUSA as an organization.

Following Mr. McNair's interview, the Committee invited witnesses and guests with personal experience working in select fields pertinent to the Committee's mandate, or who were known to have institutional knowledge that could be especially worthy of the Committee's time. Invited witnesses and guests include: current and former CUSA full-time staff (including a former CUSA executive), current and the most recent former executives, current and former student leaders from recently reformed students' associations in Ontario were invited, and consultants from the student union movement in the United Kingdom were invited. All witnesses were agreed upon by Committee members in earlier Committee meetings.

The Committee also organized four public forums for students-at-large to raise any questions, comments, or concerns regarding reforms to CUSA's governance and elections systems. Students had a wide variety of concerns, comments, and suggestions for Committee members to consider; however, the Committee noticed there were a few issues with wide-spread support. The Committee noted:

- Students were generally opposed to the slate system and were concerned about the hiring process of CUSAs Electoral Officers.
- CUSA struggles to provide clear communication to students about opportunities and operations.
- A series of former Electoral Officers also gave testimonies (requesting for anonymity for the sake of their well-being), most of whom vividly described the hate and vitriol received during their time in office and recommended that Electoral Officers not be selected from the student body.

===== Summary of Recommendations by the Democratic Reform Committee =====
- Recommendation One: As such, the Committee recommends that Council vote to endorse a merger of the Carleton University Students' Association ("the Association") and CUSA, Inc. ("the Corporation").
- Recommendation Two: The Committee recommends the creation and implementation of a well recruited, dutifully selected, properly trained, and expertly advised independent Board of Directors composed of 8 students-at-large and the CUSA President to focus on protecting the long-term future of CUSA from a financial, legal, and reputational perspective.
- Recommendation Three: The Committee further recommends modifications to the voting rights, selection process, legal responsibilities, and oversight mechanisms as described above, of: CUSA President/Chief Executive Officer; CUSA Vice Presidents; and CUSA Councillors
- Recommendation Four: The Committee recommends the roles of executives become full-time at 35 hours per week.
- Recommendation Five: The Committee recommends that only the President and CUSA Councillors be elected in at-large elections, with Vice Presidents selected in processes determined by CUSA council.
- Recommendation Six: The committee recommends that limits be placed on how and when CUSA Executives are able to serve more than one term, including options such as nonconsecutive term limits, a limit of one term as an executive, or a "move up or move out" philosophy engrained in the CUSA Bylaws.

Out of these 6 recommendations, only Recommendation Four was met with a serious debate from the 2021/2022 CUSA Council. The end result of the debate was to designate the President's role as a full-time position for the entirety of the governance year, with the Vice Presidents working full-time (35 hours/week) during the summer & part-time (25 hours/week) during the academic year. While the President's role requires a 35 hour/week commitment throughout governance year, the role may take a limited number of courses - pertaining to approval by the CUSA Board.

==== CUSA Board ====
The CUSA Board holds responsibility for the long-term financial, legal, and reputational position of the corporation. As a Not-For-Profit Corporation, the CUSA Board is subject to all relevant principles and policies of the Ontario government, provincial law, and the Articles of Incorporation. To ensure ethical fiscal management within CUSA operations & strategy, all members of the Board hold a fiduciary responsibility towards the organization.

Composition of the CUSA Board

1. 8 student-at-large directors
2. The CUSA President (ex-officio)
3. The CUSA Vice President Finance/Secretary-Treasurer (ex-officio, non-voting)

Eligibility to be a Director

1. Be a current Carleton Undergraduate student at the time of application, intending on remaining a Carleton Undergraduate student for the duration of the term of appointment
2. Directors may not be employees of CUSA, unless occupying ex-officio positions (President/CEO, VP Finance/Secretary-Treasurer)
3. Directors may not be sitting CUSA councillors, or CUSA councillors within the most recent academic year
4. Directors may not be former CUSA executives
5. Board Members may not maintain or hold fiduciary responsibility to another entity that could conceivably regularly conflict with their fiduciary responsibility to CUSA while a member of the Board.
6. Directors shall not serve more than four calendar years on the CUSA Board.

Ascension to the Board

1. Candidates for the board shall be reviewed and selected by the CUSA Board Nominating and Appointing Committee for ratification by CUSA Council
2. CUSA Council will then vote to ratify or deny the selection
3. All applicants so ratified will immediately ascend to the CUSA Board

Primary Responsibilities

1. Inform strategic direction and organizational growth
2. Provide oversight and accountability for the organization
3. Monitor policies, procedures, and processes of decision making and resource allocation
4. Approve the budget every year
5. Comply with the Not-For-Profit Corporations Act (2010)

==== CUSA Council ====
With changes in the governance of the organization, the CUSA Council now holds responsibility for hiring Vice Presidents and appointing the Board of Directors. The Council operates as a deciding body for the association's day-to-day business, holding power on advocacy & accountability actions of the Executive team, with a stronger emphasis on Presidential accountability as the President is the only elected body. The Vice Presidents work as "hired officers" of the association, accountable to the council & the board. Since the positions for Vice Presidents are no longer elected by students-at-large, per the Ontario Not For Profit Corporations Act (2010), they are not allowed to hold voting powers in the council and their seats were converted to student representative seats allocated on the basis of enrolment in the academic faculty.

==== CUSA Executives ====
Per the new governance structure, the President is now the only position elected by students-at-large. To optimize governance & operations, the roles of Vice Presidents were redefined, with much of their power dispersed to other check-and-balance bodies within CUSA. The change in governance and organization hierarchy led to the determination that the positions of Vice Presidents should be selected, elected, and appointed by the CUSA Council after the CUSA General Election. To ensure organizational efficiency, the CUSA President's role was determined and changed to be a full-time role that requires a 35 hours/week commitment with due responsibility and accountability to the CUSA Board of Directors, CUSA Council, and the Not For Profit Corporations Act (2010).

== Elections ==
CUSA holds general elections every year with by-elections held every October. With the land-slide win of a "No Confidence" vote in the 2022 CUSA General Elections & its consequent nullification due to the instant-runoff voting system, the association soon after reformed its electoral code. The association now uses the single transferable vote system. The association has been holding online elections since 2014. Voter turnout in 2017 was over 37%. The voter turnout in the 2024 General Elections was 19.8%.

CUSA General Elections Voter Turnout
Year	Voter Turnout (in %)
2017	37.2
2018	34.9
2019	27.8
2020	34.4
2021	24.7
2022	13.1
2023	13.3
2024	19.8
2025	21.3
2026	9.4

=== 2026 CUSA Elections ===
The Carleton University Students’ Association (CUSA) held its presidential election for the 2026-2027 term.

There were two candidates on the balet, Maxwell Heroux and Aryan Singh (who later withdrew from the race), as well as an opportunity to reopen nominations. Voting was held from the 3rd to the 5th of February. Numerous complaints complicated the release of the electoral results, delaying their release until February 27th, 2026.

Maxwell Heroux won the 2026 presidential seat, receiving the majority of the vote.

=== 2025 CUSA Elections ===
2025 CUSA Presidential Election
- February 4-6 2025
- Turnout: 21.3% (▲1.5%)
Candidate	~~Nagam Abuihmaid~~	Sean Joe-Ezigbo	Chas Nuhn
Popular vote	~~2,034~~	2,781	1,291
Percentage	~~49.9%~~	68.3%	31.7%
CUSA President before election
Sarah El Fitori
Elected CUSA President
Sean Joe-Ezigbo

The Carleton University Students’ Association (CUSA) held its presidential election for the 2025-2026 term from February 4 to February 6, with undergraduate students voting through a ranked ballot system. Three candidates—Nagam Abuihmaid, Chas Nuhn, and Sean Joe-Ezigbo—competed for the position, each presenting distinct policy priorities and financial strategies.

Abuihmaid, a third-year neuroscience student, campaigned on improving CUSA transparency, advocating for better public transit connections, and developing a CUSA mobile app. She emphasized the need for direct campus bus routes, streamlined communication with student clubs, and increased student awareness of CUSA services.

Nuhn, a third-year public affairs and policy management (PAPM) student, focused on reducing student costs by proposing CUSA’s withdrawal from the Canadian Federation of Students (CFS), lowering CUSA executive salaries by $5000 each, increasing free printing from 100 to 150 pages per student, donating additional weights and ropes to the Carleton University gym and developing a student phone plan. He also proposed the creation of the/a University Network for Inclusion, Training and Yoth (UNITY) Hub to support marginalized students who feel excluded at Carleton University and to enhance leadership training for all CUSA Club executives.

Joe-Ezigbo, a fourth-year commerce student and former CUSA vice president (finance), centered his campaign on financial reform. He advocated for a levy review, summer operational adjustments for CUSA businesses, and the creation of an off-campus housing support centre. He also proposed survivor-centric sexual violence support and parking reimbursements for students with accessibility needs.

During a debate held on January 28, candidates discussed transit advocacy, student engagement, and CUSA’s financial challenges, including its $1.2 million budget deficit. While all three candidates supported reducing OC Transpo U-Pass fees, they differed on approaches to CUSA’s finances. Joe-Ezigbo and Abuihmaid supported a student levy increase, while Nuhn expressed concerns about charging students more money despite acknowledging CUSA’s financial struggles.

The election results saw Nagam Abuihmaid winning the popular vote in the first round with 2,034 votes, with Sean Joe-Ezigbo taking the popular vote in the final round with 2,781 votes. The results further revealed the candidate Nagam Abuihmaid to be disqualified, preventing them from continuing to the 2nd round of voting.

=== 2024 CUSA Elections ===
2024 CUSA Presidential Election
- February 6-8 2024
- Registered: 4505
- Turnout: 19.8% (▲6.5%)
Candidate	Sarah El Fitori	Sean Joe-Ezigbo
Popular vote	2,017	1,832
Percentage	52.4%	47.6%
CUSA President before election
Mohamed Riazudden
Elected CUSA President
Sarah El Fitori

The Carleton University Students’ Association (CUSA) held its presidential election for the 2024-2025 term from February 6 to February 8, with undergraduate students voting through a ranked ballot system, with Sarah El Fitori elected as CUSA President. Despite Sean Joe-Ezigbo leading in first-round votes, El Fitori secured victory in the final round with 2,017 votes (52.4%), defeating Joe-Ezigbo, who received 1,832 votes (47.6%).

The election saw a voter turnout of 19.8%, a significant increase from the previous year’s 13.4%. According to CUSA’s electoral code, votes were counted using the Hare Quota, and eliminated candidates had their votes transferred to remaining contenders in subsequent rounds. The final elimination order was Burte Ariunbold (Round 2), Finlay Maroney (Round 3), Kamran Azizli (Round 4), and Sean Joe-Ezigbo (Round 5).

In addition to the presidential race, all five referendum questions passed, including the creation of an Equity, Diversity, and Inclusion levy, a First-year Transition levy, and an increase to the Clubs and Societies levy. Students also voted to remove the Millennium Promise and World Food Programme fees.

The results were announced on February 12, 2024, at Ollie’s Pub and Patio, a CUSA-owned venue. 27 councillors were also elected across various faculties, and El Fitori began her term on May 1, 2024, alongside the newly selected vice-presidents.

== Services ==
=== Businesses ===
Several businesses are provided by CUSA:

- Ollie's
- Roosters Coffee House

=== Service centres ===
The student union fees cover several services to students through service centres:

- Carleton Disability Awareness Centre (CDAC)
- Unified Support Centre (USC)
- Gender and Sexuality Resource Centre (GSRC)
- Mawandoseg Centre
- Racialized and International Student Experience (RISE)
- Wellness Centre
- Women's Centre

=== Clubs and societies ===
CUSA oversee's over 200 recognized clubs and societies. CUSA also offers a number of different services to clubs and societies. A directory of all certified clubs and societies, and services available to them, can be found at cusaclubs.ca.

== Controversies ==
=== Abortion rights ===
On December 5, 2006, CUSA voted 26-25-1-1 (26 in favour, 25 against, 1 abstaining, 1 absent) of supporting abortion rights, and discontinuing anti-abortion activism. This drew critical reactions from anti-abortion groups and from campus groups, such as the Carleton University Debating Society, that said CUSA was stifling open debate. Those in favour of the motion defended it as ensuring "women's rights" on campus. This vote was reversed in December 2012.

=== Shinerama cystic fibrosis fundraising controversy ===
Motion to Drop Shinerama Fundraising Campaign from Orientation Week

Whereas Orientation week strives to be [as] inclusive as possible;

Whereas all orientees and volunteers should feel like their fundraising efforts will serve the their [sic] diverse communities;

And Whereas Cystic fibrosis has been recently revealed to only affect white people, and primarily men

Be it resolved that the CUSA representatives on the incoming Orientation Supervisory Board work to select a new broad reaching charity for orientation week.

— Moved: Donnie Northrup
Seconded: Meera Chander

In November 2008, the CUSA voted to drop its annual Shinerama cystic fibrosis fundraiser, in favour of a fundraiser for an as-yet-undetermined charity, because the illness is not "inclusive" enough. Shinerama is a fundraiser held at universities across Canada every fall in support of the Canadian Cystic Fibrosis Foundation (CCFF), first held in 1961; Carleton has participated for the past 25 years and has contributed nearly $1 million to the cause.

Donnie Northrup, CUSA councillor representing the Faculty of Science, introduced the motion which stated that cystic fibrosis "has been recently revealed to only affect white people, and primarily men" and that therefore, it was inappropriate for the CUSA to donate money to researching a cure. Supporters of the motion argued that "all orientees and volunteers should feel like their fundraising efforts will serve the their [sic] diverse communities."

==== Reactions and Criticism ====
The CUSA was criticized for this decision since the motion did not reveal the source of the claim that cystic fibrosis affects only white people. In fact, the CCFF's website states that: "The disease is most common in caucasians, but it can affect all races." Nick Bergamini, a CUSA council member who represents Journalism students, stated that "They're playing racial politics with something that is supposed to bring people together – a charity." Bergamini commented that "they see this, in their own twisted way, as a win for diversity. I see it as a loss for people with cystic fibrosis."

Cathleen Morrison, who is the CEO of the CCFF, stated in an interview with CTV News that although cystic fibrosis "does affect Caucasian populations primarily," the term Caucasian includes people from South Asia, North Africa, the Persian Gulf and Israel. Morrison explained that "These are Caucasian populations. These people do not have white skin. They have CF, it now seems, in the same ratios as other Caucasian people who do have white skin." Morrison also stated that cystic fibrosis affects just as many young girls as boys.

Jonathan Kay, a columnist for the National Post, blasted CUSA for this decision. Kay stated that "Even by the loopy standards of students governments, this has got to be a new low." Kay argued that cystic fibrosis, although it has a much higher rate of occurrence in caucasian males, affects all races and both genders. Kay also pointed out that many charity events raise money for breast cancer, even though it is primarily a female disease, and for Tay–Sachs disease, whose sufferers are almost exclusively Jewish. Editorial and opinion articles from the Ottawa Citizen have also condemned CUSA's actions with the editorial declaring that "when [a student association] does something as ignorant and thoughtless as Carleton University's did this week, the country pays attention."

==== Subsequent response by CUSA ====
CUSA president Brittany Smyth later stated that the council has been considering rotating the beneficiary of Shinerama instead of always giving the money to one charity, arguing that "It's about people wanting to do something different." Smyth said the colour of someone's skin wasn't at issue; rather, the decision was made to spread the university's fundraising efforts to other charities. In an interview with CTV news, Smyth stated that "There was some discussion about that issue but very small. Most of it was around just switching it up and doing something different for a change."

CUSA released a statement on November 26 indicating that the association's council would revisit their decision. Smyth stated, "It has become clear that there is not an appetite at Carleton to change from [Shinerama]... The responsible thing to do is to reverse the decision," adding that "the motion was never meant to imply that raising funds for Cystic Fibrosis research was not a worthwhile cause." Smyth announced an emergency meeting of CUSA's council to vote on a new motion to reinstate the charity. A unanimous vote at that meeting revoked the earlier decision, approved the restoration of next year's Shinerama campaign and also approved the publication of an apology over the matter. Donnie Northrup, the council representative responsible for moving the original motion to cancel Shinerama, resigned his position at CUSA as did another councillor, Sean Maguire. However, over the summer of 2009 Northrup was acclaimed back into CUSA. The meeting also received petitions demanding the resignation of Smyth and certain other councillors, although no actions on these were immediately taken.

=== Disqualification of a President-Elect ===
On February 13, 2009, Bruce Kyereh-Addo of the Demand Better slate was found to be in violation of the Consolidated Electoral Code on multiple counts and subsequently disqualified. To date, Kyereh-Addo's disqualification was upheld by the electoral board.

=== 2009 CFS referendum petition ===
During the 2009–2010 school year, a group of students launched a petition to hold a referendum on possible disaffiliation of CUSA from the CFS. Stated reasoning for this referendum was to counter issues such as the claimed ineffectiveness of the CFS and interference in other university's unions. In a press release the petitioners stated that the CFS "made almost no gains as a lobby group in its 30 years of operation." This was strongly denied by the CFS.

After several weeks a counter petition was created to try to bar the issue from going to a university-wide vote, which was controversially spearheaded by several CUSA officials. Soon afterward CUSA officially endorsed the counter-petition by a vote of 17 in favour, 7 against and 9 abstaining. The motion also mandates that CUSA members must advocate in favour of the CFS. This has attracted more criticism toward CUSA by students who feel it should stay neutral and instead try to help students make an informed decision. The pro-referendum petition ended up garnering over 2300 signatures before its submission to the CFS offices in Toronto. Despite being hand-delivered by a Bailiff, the CFS have stated they did not receive the petition. A referendum at Carleton had previously been held in 1995, on the possibility of joining the newly formed Canadian Alliance of Student Associations (CASA), that lost narrowly.

=== Disqualification of VP Student Services ===
In 2016, Ashley Courchene, a third year political science major, ran for Vice President Student Services under the slate Change. After she won the election by 21 votes, the Chief Electoral Officer (CEO) Matt Swain disqualified the Change slate due to an alleged infraction by the assistant campaign manager Ahmad Gitteh and presidential candidate Abdullah Jabber, which led to Ashley Courchene's disqualification. Mr. Courchene successfully appealed the disqualification to the Electoral Board. Your Carleton then successfully appealed to the Constitutional Board (which overrides the electoral board). Mr. Courchene then went to the Ontario Superior Court, which reinstated him to the position of VPSS. Neither CUSA nor Your Carleton appealed the court's decision.

== See also ==
- List of Ontario students' associations
