= Ray Dorsey =

American neurologist

- Education: Stanford University; Perelman School of Medicine; Wharton School
- Occupation: Neurologist

Earl Ray Dorsey is an American neurologist who leads the Center for the Brain & the Environment at the Atria Health and Research Institute. Previously, he directed the Center for Health + Technology at the University of Rochester, chaired the international Huntington Study Group, and led the movement disorder division and neurology telemedicine at Johns Hopkins Medicine. Dorsey has studied and published results from programs related to movement disorders, including Huntington's disease and Parkinson's disease. In 2015, the White House named him as one of eight "Champions of change in the fight against Parkinson's disease".

== Education ==
Dorsey earned his Bachelor of Science degree in biological sciences at Stanford University. He subsequently received Doctor of Medicine and Master of Business Administration degrees from the University of Pennsylvania's School of Medicine and the Wharton School. Dorsey completed his neurology residency at the Hospital of the University of Pennsylvania and a fellowship in movement disorders and experimental therapeutics at the University of Rochester Medical Center.

== Career ==
In 2007, Dorsey and fellow neurologist Kevin Biglan started a telehealth program for Parkinson's patients in nursing homes. The duo published results from the program and continued to collaborate when Dorsey was at Johns Hopkins Medicine from 2010 to 2013. Dorsey was the director of the movement disorder division and neurology telemedicine at Johns Hopkins Hospital.

Dorsey returned to URMC in 2013 and became the director of the Center for Health + Technology in 2014. There Dorsey led a smartphone application research study called mPower. He and Suchi Saria were among co-authors of a research paper for the study published by JAMA Neurology, which was funded by the National Institute of Neurological Disorders and Stroke and The Michael J. Fox Foundation. Dorsey also helped lead URMC's Parkinson Disease Care New York, a statewide telemedicine program for people with Parkinson's disease. In 2015, the White House named Dorsey as one of eight "Champions of change in the fight against Parkinson's disease". At Rochester, Dorsey holds the David M. Levy Professorship of Neurology.

From 2014 to 2018, Dorsey was the chair of the Huntington Study Group, an organization that seeks to find new treatments for those with Huntington's disease. He co-wrote the books Ending Parkinson's Disease: A Prescription for Action (2020) and The Parkinson's Plan: A New Path to Prevention and Treatment (2025), which reached The New York Times Best Seller list in September 2025, and which Publishers Weekly describes as a "prescriptive guide" of the disease. Dorsey and co-author Michael S. Okun received the 2022 Tom Isaacs Award from The Cure Parkinson's Trust and the Van Andel Institute for their work related to the disease. Combined, as of 2025, the two have published approximately 1,000 papers and treated 10,000 people with Parkinson's. In Ending Parkinson's, Dorsey, Okun, and their co-authors called Parkinson's "a man-made pandemic". Dorsey's research has been published in medical and economic journals, and featured in media outlets such as NPR, The New York Times, and The Wall Street Journal.

== See also ==
- List of Johns Hopkins University people
- List of Perelman School of Medicine at the University of Pennsylvania alumni
- List of Stanford University alumni
- List of Wharton School alumni

== Select publications ==
- "Randomized Controlled Clinical Trial of "Virtual House Calls" for Parkinson Disease". JAMA Neurology. 70 (5). American Medical Association. May 2013. OCLC 828795097.
- "Natural history of Huntington disease". JAMA Neurology. 70 (12): 1, 520–1, 530. December 2013.
- Dorsey, Ray (March 30, 2015). "Using Technology to Give People with Parkinson's Specialized Care". USA.gov.
- "Deep Phenotyping of Parkinson's Disease". Journal of Parkinson's Disease. 10 (3): 855–873. 2020.
- "The Rise of Parkinson's Disease". American Scientist. 108 (3). Sigma Xi: 176. May–June 2020. ISSN 0003-0996.
- Dorsey, E Ray; Greenamyre, J Timothy; Willis, Allison W (July 1, 2023). "The Water, the Air, the Marines-Camp Lejeune, Trichloroethylene, and Parkinson Disease". JAMA Neurology. 80 (7): 663–665 – via PubMed.
- Dorsey, E Ray; Bloem, Bastiaan R (2024). "Parkinson's Disease Is Predominantly an Environmental Disease". Journal of Parkinson's Disease. 14 (3): 451-465 – via PubMed.
- Dorsey, E Ray; Okun, Michael S; Bloem, Bastiaan R (October 21, 2025). "A PLAN to address the Parkinson pandemic". Journal of Parkinson's Disease – via PubMed.
- Dorsey, E Ray; Tanner, Caroline M (October 21, 2025). "Trichloroethylene and Parkinson Disease". Neurology. 105 (8). OCLC 960771045 – via PubMed.
- "Environmental toxicants and Parkinson's disease: recent evidence, risks, and prevention opportunities". Lancet Neurology. 24 (11): 976–986. November 2025. ISSN 1474-4465 – via PubMed.

=== Books ===
- Dorsey, Ray; Sherer, Todd; Okun, Michael S.; Bloem, Bastiaan R. (March 17, 2020). Ending Parkinson's Disease: A Prescription for Action. PublicAffairs (Perseus Books Group).
- Dorsey, Ray; Okun, Michael S. (August 19, 2025). The Parkinson's Plan: A New Path to Prevention and Treatment. PublicAffairs.
