= Tashkin =

Tashkin is a surname. Notable people with the surname include:

- Donald Tashkin, American pulmonologist
- Ilter Tashkin (born 1994), German footballer
