= Shinerama =

National Shinerama Logo

Shinerama is Canada's largest post-secondary fundraiser involving students at almost 60 university and college campuses across Canada, aimed at raising money for cystic fibrosis research.

Shinerama was developed in 1961 at Waterloo Lutheran University (now Wilfrid Laurier University) by Paul Enns as a way for first-year students to get involved and give back to their community. Enns partnered with the Esquire Shoe Polish Company and generated funds were initially donated to the Sunbeam Home for Retarded Children in Kitchener. It was not until 1964, when the national Shinerama campaign for the Canadian Cystic Fibrosis Foundation was launched, that funds were directed to support Cystic Fibrosis research.

The success of Shinerama allowed this charitable event to grow from a small municipal shoe-shining event to becoming one of Canada's largest fundraising efforts. Shinerama currently boasts 55 universities participating in the event countrywide in this annual affair and continues to work with the CCFF.

In 2006, Shinerama attracted more than 35,000 student volunteers in more than 56 Canadian cities, towns, and communities. Together, students from coast to coast shine shoes, wash cars, co-ordinate raffles and barbecues, as well as numerous other events, in support of cystic fibrosis research and care.

Shinerama has raised more than $17.5 million to support the fight against cystic fibrosis since the campaign began. In 2007, Shinerama student volunteers raised more than $985,638, a record breaking year, to help fund CCFF research and treatment programs. In 2010, Shinerama student volunteers raised $1,000,000 during their campaigns.

== Controversy ==
In 2008, the Carleton University Students' Association (CUSA) voted to drop their annual Shinerama fundraiser, on the alleged grounds that "cystic fibrosis has been recently revealed to only affect white people, and primarily men".

The controversy garnered attention from mainstream news media. According to the CCFF, cystic fibrosis does mainly affect Caucasians, which would also include nonwhites with ancestry from India and the Middle East, but also affects blacks and east Asians. CUSA later announced plans to revisit their decision.

== See also ==
- Cystic fibrosis
- Canadian Cystic Fibrosis Foundation
