= List of cystic fibrosis organizations =

The following organizations assist people with or conduct research on cystic fibrosis, a hereditary disease that affects the lungs and digestive system, causing progressive disability and often premature death.

== Australia ==
- Cystic Fibrosis Australia (CFA), an Australian national organization aimed at raising awareness and education of cystic fibrosis through advocacy and research
- CF Together (formerly Cystic Fibrosis Community Care), the largest Australian organisation dedicated to raising awareness of CF, providing support services and advocacy to people living with CF, and funding research into CF. CF Together supports over 1,300 members and represents over 3,800 people living with CF in Australia.
- Cystic Fibrosis Western Australia (CFWA), a Western Australian based organization that funds critical research and essential support services to improve the lives of children and adults afflicted by cystic fibrosis.

== Europe ==
- Vaincre la Mucoviscidose, a French based organization founded in 1965, providing research, health collaboration, social support and informations.
- Association Grégory Lemarchal, a French organization dedicated to information outreach and research for cystic fibrosis, named after the French singer and Star Academy winner Grégory Lemarchal
- Build4Life, a voluntary Irish Cystic Fibrosis charity that raises funds to develop CF facilities.
- Cystic Fibrosis Ireland (CFI), a voluntary Irish organization set up in 1963 by parents, to aid patients with CF by improving facilities and treatments,
- Child Health International (CHI), a UK-based organization providing help especially in Eastern Europe, concentrating on low-cost, sustainable solutions based on teamwork and family involvement.
- Chloe Cotton Trust Fund, a UK-based foundation to help support families and their children with cystic fibrosis.
- Cystic Fibrosis Foundation Slovenia, a Slovenian association providing information and care for CF patients and their families
- Nederlandse Cystic Fibrosis Stichting, a Dutch organization providing research, information, and care for people and families with cystic fibrosis
- Cystic Fibrosis Trust, a UK charity providing research, information and care for people with cystic fibrosis
- DCFH - Deutsche CF-Hilfe - Unterstützung für Menschen mit Mukoviszidose e.V., a German-based patient organization to support people with cystic fibrosis
- European Cystic Fibrosis Society (ECFS), a Denmark-based organization of clinicians and scientists actively engaged in CF research, care and collaboration
- Mukolife.com is a German social network for the CF community where members can post blogs, ask questions, chat, maintain a profile, contact others and search members. It is created by the CF community for the CF community.
- Cisztás Fibrózis Betegek Egyesülete (CFBE), Association of cystic fibrosis patients organization to support people and family with cystic fibrosis.

== North America ==
- Attain Health Foundation, an organization that helps individuals living with cystic fibrosis optimize their health through partnership and peer support.
- Claire's Place Foundation, a US-based non-profit providing support to children and families affected by cystic fibrosis. Named in honor of Claire Wineland, who lived with CF her entire life and died at the age of 21. Claire was an activist, author, TEDx speaker, and social media star who received numerous awards.
- Blooming Rose Foundation, a US-based organization that offers support and social services to families with a new diagnosis of CF.
- Boomer Esiason Foundation, a US-based organization supporting research aimed at finding a cure for cystic fibrosis as well as providing education and raising quality of life for people with cystic fibrosis, is named after Boomer Esiason, a former NFL quarterback whose son Gunnar has cystic fibrosis.
- Breathe 4 Tomorrow Foundation (B4TF), a US-based organization focused on making life easier one breath at a time for people with CF through assistive services, awareness, and research,
- Breathe Bravely, a US-based organization committed to connecting and serving the CF community through the art of singing, offers free vocal lessons and features a CF-based virtual choir.
- Cystic Fibrosis Continuity of Care, LLC, is a US-based specialty nurse consulting firm that provides both clinical and business process improvement services surrounding the coordination of care for patients living with CF.
- Cystic-L, a listserv and a website dedicated to the exchange of information and support specific to cystic fibrosis. Operating since 1994, Cystic-L serves people with CF and those who share their lives: medical professionals, scientists, researchers, parents, grandparents, spouses, siblings, friends, and significant others.
- Cystic Fibrosis Canada (CCFF), a Canada-wide health charity, funds cystic fibrosis research and care.
- Cystic Fibrosis Foundation (CFF), a US non-profit providing the means to cure and control cystic fibrosis
- Cystic Fibrosis Lifestyle Foundation (CFLF) seeks to create therapies that engage adolescents and young adults with cystic fibrosis as active agents in their healthcare, physically, psychologically, and spiritually, thereby enabling attitudes and lifestyles that create stronger and longer lives for themselves. Founded by Brian Callanan
- Cystic Fibrosis-Reaching Out Foundation, a US-based network of information and support for people with CF and their families.
- CysticLife.org (CL), A positive social network for the CF community where members can post blogs, ask questions, maintain a profile, contact others, and search members by age, location, gender, and relation to CF.
- Elizabeth Nash Foundation, a US-based organization focused on research, education, and patient support, is named after scientist Elizabeth Nash.
- Emily's Entourage, a nonprofit organization that raises money and awareness to help find a cure for rare ("nonsense") mutations of cystic fibrosis (CF), named after Emily Kramer-Golinkoff.
- Help One Love One, a US-based non-profit organization assisting adults with CF with nutritional support.
- Liv for a Cure, a US-based foundation dedicated to raising money for the fight against CF.
- Liam Foundation, a non-profit organization dedicated to raising money and enhancing the lives of those with Cystic Fibrosis.
- Lungs for Life Foundation, a US-based organization focused on improving the quality of life for people with CF through assistive services, education and research.
- Mauli Ola Foundation, based out of Hawaii, co-chaired by pro surfer Kala Alexander, that takes kids (and adults) with CF surfing (often with world champion surfers such as Kelly Slater and Sunny Garcia) introducing them to the natural therapeutic effects of the ocean. The foundation strives to raise awareness of CF.
- National Cystic Fibrosis Awareness Committee (NCFAC), a US-based group focused on increased public CF awareness through an annual national Cystic Fibrosis Awareness observance.
- New Jersey State Organization of Cystic Fibrosis (NJSOCF), an organization in New Jersey whose mission is to ease the financial burdens placed on the cystic fibrosis community and offer support.
- Rock CF Foundation, a US-based non-profit organization that uses the arts, entertainment, fashion and fitness to increase awareness and raise funds for cystic fibrosis. Founded by Emily Schaller.
- Take A Breather Foundation, grants wishes for children living with CF in the Philadelphia area. Founded in 2012.
- Piper's Angels Foundation (PAF), its mission is to support and improve the lives of people in the CF community by raising awareness through education, offering life expanding activities, providing urgent financial support and funding essential research.
- Point A Fibrosis, a US-Based non-profit organization destined to help provide services to patients diagnosed with Cystic and Pulmonary Fibrosis. Founded by Arjav Mehta, Rohan Jaganath, and Shadab Ali.

== International ==
- Cystic Fibrosis Worldwide (CFW), an international network concentrated on increasing quality of life and life expectancy for people with cystic fibrosis
- CysticFibrosis.com, an internet information hub with support forums
- CysticLife.org (CL), a positive social network for the CF community where members can post blogs, ask questions, maintain a profile, contact others and search members by age, location, sex and relation to CF.
- Sharktank.org, an internet group composed of mostly patients and parents. Research and education are the main focus with the objective that knowledge of the disease wallowsbetter decision-making and improve overall health.
- Pafibrosis.org (PAF), an organization destined to help provide services to patients diagnosed with Fibrosis, a youth-led organization by the youth and for the youth.
