= San Baw =

Burmese orthopaedic surgeon and ivory prosthesis pioneer

Chief of Orthopaedic Surgery, Rangoon General Hospital
- In office June 1975 – October 1980

Chief of Orthopaedic Surgery, Mandalay General Hospital
- In office November 1957 – May 1975

Personal details
- Born: San Baw; 29 June 1922; Friday, 6th waxing of Waso 1284 ME Tapun, Pegu Division, British Burma
- Died: 7 December 1984 (aged 62); Friday, Full moon of Nadaw 1346 ME Mandalay, Mandalay Division, Myanmar
- Spouse: Myint Myint Khin (m. 1953–1984)
- Children: Myint Zan
- Parent(s): Thaw Zan and Si Si
- Education: University of Rangoon (MBBS); University of Pennsylvania (MD, MS)

San Baw (Burmese: စံဘော်, pronounced [sàɰ̃ bɔ̀]; 29 June 1922 – 7 December 1984) was a Burmese orthopaedic surgeon. He is best known for pioneering "the use of ivory hip prostheses to replace ununited fractures of the neck of the femur," and developing "a new technique for treating infantile pseudoarthrosis of the tibia." As the chief orthopaedic surgeon at Mandalay General Hospital (1957–1975) and at Rangoon General Hospital (1975–1980), he performed over 300 ivory hip prosthesis surgeries over his career. He also taught orthopaedics at the Institute of Medicine, Mandalay and at the Institute of Medicine 1, Rangoon throughout his career.

After his death from complications from lung cancer in 1984, his wife Prof. Myint Myint Khin through the Burma Medical Association established the Dr. San Baw Prize for Research. In 2019, their son Myint Zan and the Myanmar Orthopaedic Society established the Dr. San Baw Research Fund to support orthopedic research and training activities.

== Early life and education ==
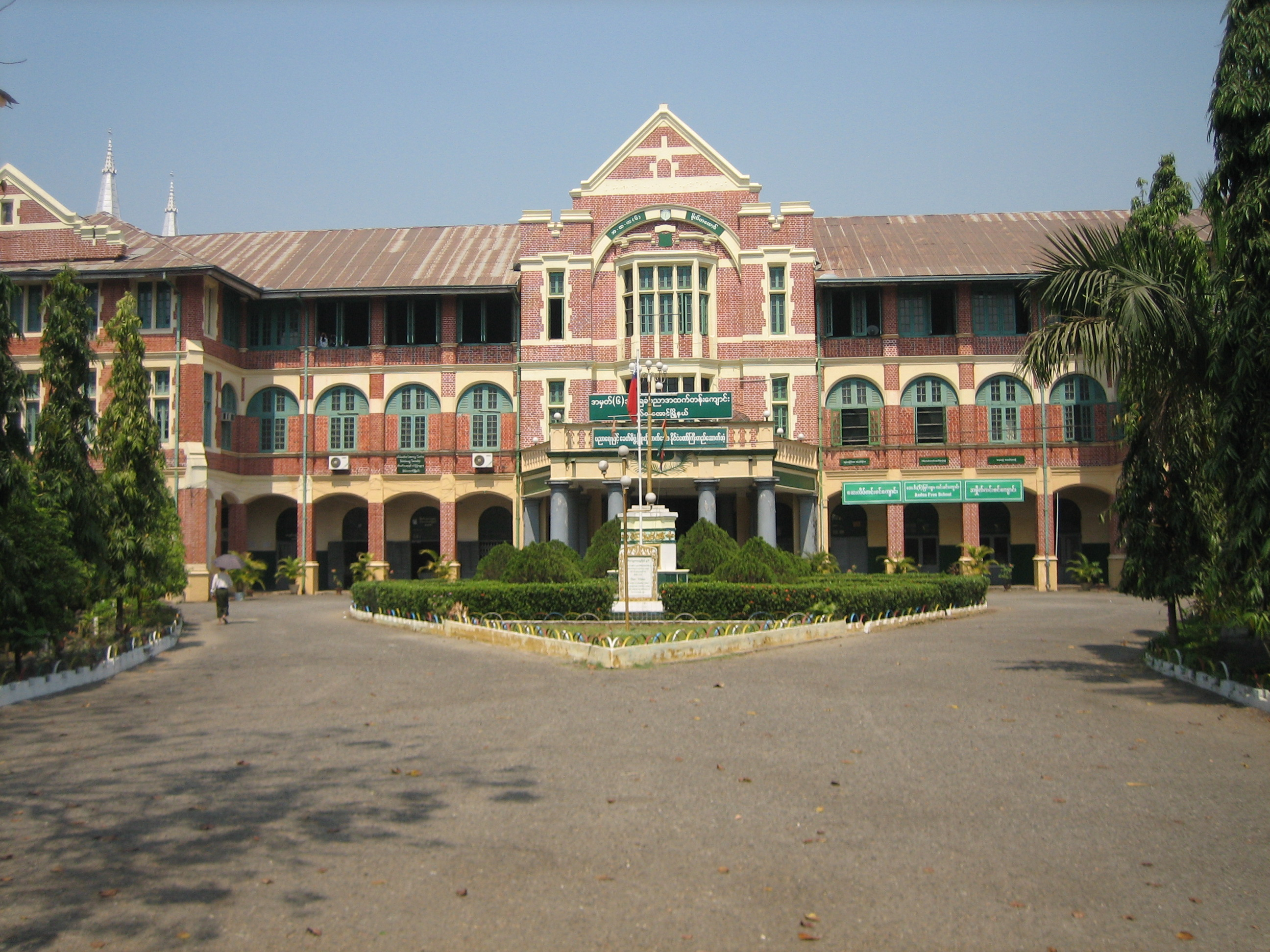
St. Paul's High School

San Baw was born on 29 June 1922 to Daw Si Si and U Thaw Zan in Tapun, a small town 220 km northwest of Rangoon (Yangon) in British Burma. His parents apparently were well-to-do and lived around the country as he went to St. Agnes' Convent in Kalaw in the country's northeast for the first few years of primary school, and attended Rangoon's St. Paul's English High School from latter primary school to high school, graduating in 1942. However, the arrival of World War II in late 1941 had shut down all the few colleges in the country, and it was only in 1944 that he was able to enroll at the wartime medical school, founded a year earlier by Drs. Ba Than, S. Sen and Yin May. After the war, he enrolled at the just rechristened Faculty of Medicine of Rangoon University, graduating with an MBBS in March 1950.

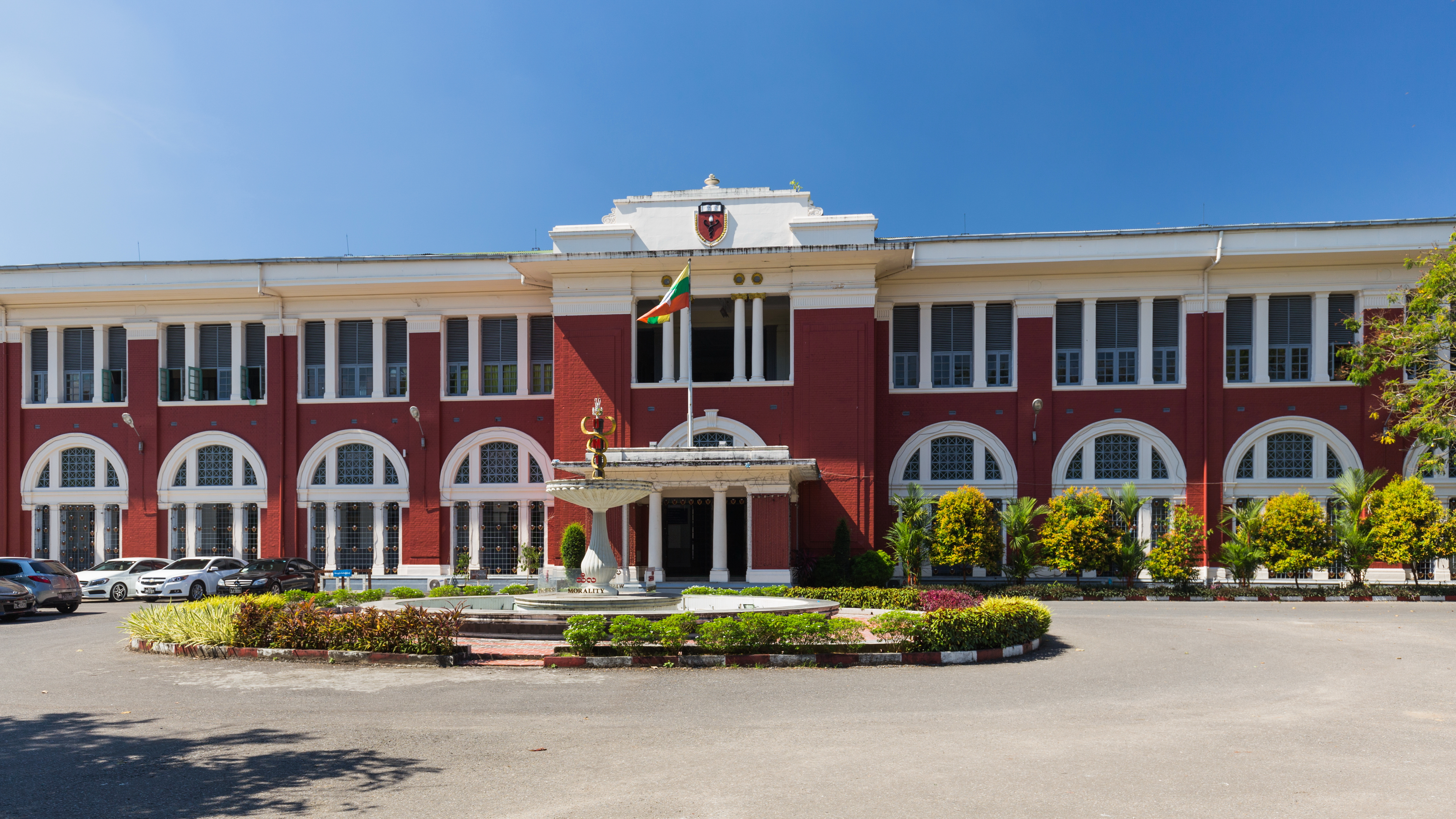
His alma mater the Faculty of Medicine of University of Rangoon, which was later renamed the Institute of Medicine 1, Rangoon by the time he returned to teach orthopaedics (1975–1980)

San Baw started his medical career at Rangoon General Hospital (RGH) in June 1950. There, he specialized in general and orthopaedic surgery, and trained under American surgeon P.F. Greene from 1951 to 1954, helping to establish the Department of Orthopaedics at RGH. From 1954 to 1957, he pursued postgraduate studies in orthopaedics at the University of Pennsylvania medical school on a state scholarship, and studied under professors Paul C. Colonna and J.T. Nicholson. He graduated with an MD and an MS in orthopedics in 1958. Upon his return from the US in November 1957, (Note: (BMA 1984: 1) and (Myint Zan 2019): He officially graduated from Penn Medicine in February 1958 in absentia.) he was appointed chief of orthopaedic surgery at Mandalay General Hospital (MGH), a teaching hospital in Mandalay.

== Career ==
San Baw went on to become the country's preeminent orthopaedic surgeon. He led the orthopaedic surgery department at MGH from 1957 to 1975, and that at RGH from 1975 to 1980 as well as helped to establish the practice of microsurgery at RGH and its affiliates in 1978. He also taught orthopaedics at Mandalay Medical College (later renamed the Institute of Medicine, Mandalay) from 1957 to 1975, and the Institute of Medicine 1, Rangoon (his alma mater, renamed) as a lecturer in orthopaedics from 1975 to 1980. He also made a number of contributions to the orthopaedic field. He is best known for pioneering the use of "ivory hip prostheses to replace ununited fractures of the neck of the femur," and for developing "a new technique for treating infantile pseudoarthrosis of the tibia."

=== Ivory hip prosthesis development ===
San Baw got the idea to use ivory for hip replacements during his days at Penn. Hip replacements using ivory had been performed by Themistocles Gluck in 1891, and Ernest W. Hey Groves in 1927 but did not gain widespread use like metallic prostheses. San Baw believed that ivory, in addition to "having better biologic properties than those of metal alloys", would also be cheaper and easier to obtain than metallic alloys in his country. Soon after his arrival at MGH, he and his team began investigating the physical properties of ivory using various mechanical tests. Based on the results, he designed "his novel ivory hip specifically for patients with longstanding nonunions of displaced femoral neck fractures, ankylosing spondylitis, and avascular necrosis. His designs were based on a Thomson hemiarthroplasty, but with major modifications to the stem, and later, to the head and neck junction."

His first ivory prosthesis was used for the first time in 1960. It replaced the un-united femoral neck fracture of an 83-year-old Burmese Buddhist nun named Daw Ponnya. The ivory prosthesis was hand-carved by an expert ivory craftsman named Tin Aung, who would later go on to shape San Baw's hip prostheses from the "long axes of ivory tusks harvested from Burmese elephants that died naturally". San Baw continued to refine his prosthesis designs using his own funds until 1965 when he finally received financial support from the Burmese government. He and his team "experimented with ivory and manufactured other implants such as phalangeal prostheses, total elbow arthroplasties, cup arthroplasty, THAs [total hip arthroplasties], ivory plates, screws, Rush pins, and even a scaphoid prosthesis." (His assistants included Dr. Khin Maung Tu, Dr. Kyaw Myint Naing and Dr. Meik.) By 1969, he had performed more than 100 ivory hip replacements.

He reported his findings at the British Orthopaedic Association conference held in London in September 1969. He read the paper “Ivory Hip Replacements for Ununited Fractures of the Neck of Femur”, and reported an 88% success rate with his patients, ranging in age from 24 to 87, able to walk, squat, ride a bicycle and play football a few weeks after their fractured hip bones were replaced with ivory prostheses. In addition to the effectiveness, a major advantage San Baw highlighted was cost. His ivory prosthesis cost "as little as $720", and was much cheaper than titanium and vitallium prostheses. He believed it could be an affordable and effective option in countries where ivory was in abundant in supply. He also emphasized that the ivory for his prostheses came from elephants that had died from natural death, and that the country had about 2000 elephants in captivity. His paper was published in the February 1970 British edition of The Journal of Bone and Joint Surgery. From 1969 to the time of his retirement in 1980, additional 200 to 300 hip prostheses were implanted. After recovery, most patients could perform everyday tasks like walking, squatting, and even playing sports.

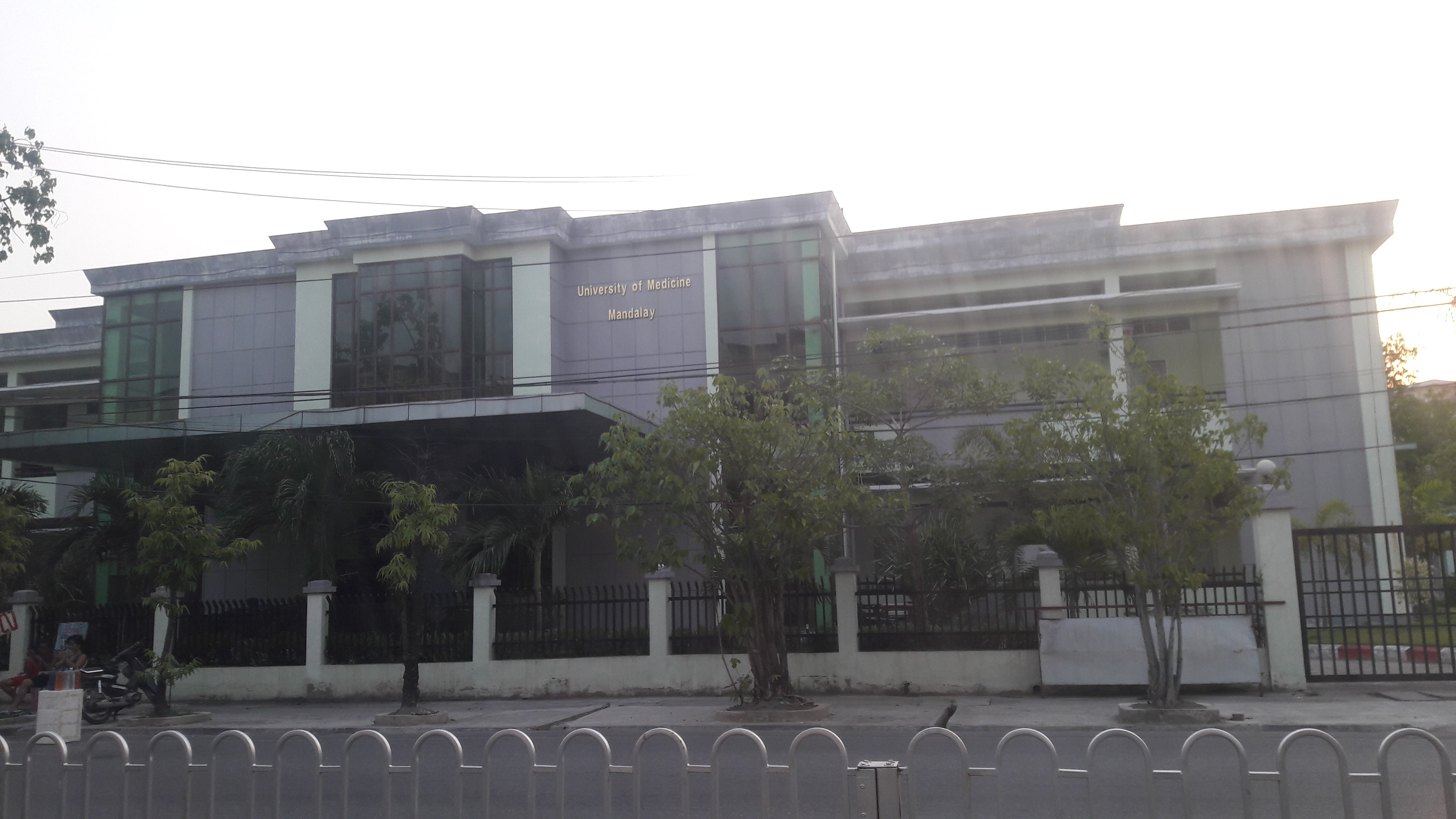
The Institute of Medicine, Mandalay where he taught from 1957 to 1975

=== Other contributions ===
San Baw pioneered other techniques. He "developed a new technique for the treatment of congenital pseudarthrosis of the tibia", which was published in the February 1975 British edition of The Journal of Bone and Joint Surgery, and used to treat at least 15 patients. Moreover, he conducted clinical research on "the use of ivory powder in place of cancellous bone to pack the resulting cavities of giant cell tumour of bone after curettage"; at least 27 cases were treated using this method. Ivory powder was also used to pack bone cavities resulting from other diseases. In 1978 alone, in at least six cases, completely amputated hands were rejoined by means of microsurgery under his supervision.

== Last years ==
San Baw retired in October 1980, at the age of 58. A heavy smoker since he was ten, San Baw spent his last years fighting lung cancer. According to his son, smoking was a "sensitive" topic for him, and even his wife and son had to approach the subject "with great care". He died on 7 December 1984 in Mandalay from complications from lung cancer. He was 62.

== Personal life ==
San Baw married Myint Myint Khin, a fellow Rangoon medical school classmate, in 1953. Both were graduates of the class of 1950. Also a graduate of Penn Medicine, she followed him to Mandalay in 1960 after being appointed Clinical Professor of Medicine at the Faculty of Medicine of the University of Mandalay. After his death, she abruptly resigned from her post as head of the Department of Medicine, and served as a consultant at the World Health Organization, based out of New Delhi, from 1985 to 1991. She had a second career as a writer, publishing 13 books between 1996 and 2013. Her last published work Poetry for Me, an English language poetry book, was inspired by her late husband. The couple had a son, Myint Zan, a former professor of law, who taught at universities in Malaysia, Australia, the South Pacific and the United States from 1989 to 2016.

== Legacy and recognition ==
San Baw's assistants carried on ivory hip replacements for at least until 1995. In all, Dr. San Baw and his successors implanted over 500 handmade ivory hip replacements between 1960 and 1995. As of 2014, at least one patient who had received an ivory hip replacement performed by San Baw's former assistant Prof. Meik in 1994, was still alive; the then 93-year-old patient reported that she had been using her ivory hip without limitation for the past 20 years. (Note: See Figs. 2–4 in (Szostakowski et al 2017: 2852–2853) for the x-rays of both hips: the 1994 ivory prosthesis and the 2014 metal prosthesis.)

San Baw died in relative obscurity. His contributions were not widely known internationally. According to his son, no international publications carried the news. The Penn Medicine magazine carried a short notice of San Baw's death with a brief description of his achievements in 1988, only after Myint Zan had contacted them. (In contrast, Myint Myint Khin's death in 2014 was carried by Burmese publications as well as by at least one international journal The BMJ. (Note: See (Yan Pai 2014) for the English and Burmese versions of Myint Myint Khin's obituary. See (Stafford 2014) for her obituary in the BMJ. (Penn Medicine 4 May 2015) states that the magazine would be running the obituary of Myint Myint Khin shortly.)) The BSPP government had not conferred any titles to him in recognition of his achievements. (Note: See his obituary in (BMA 1984), which makes no mention of any awards. He had not received any recognition by subsequent governments either at least to 2005; see (Khin Thet Hta et al 2005).)

San Baw's family has tried to keep his memory alive. Right after his death, Myint Myint Khin established the Dr. San Baw Prize for Research through the Burma Medical Association to encourage medical research in the country. However, it was funded only by a relatively small seed amount (30,000 kyats), and it is unclear if more funds were added later or how long the prize lasted. Myint Myint Khin died in 2014. In 2019, Myint Zan and the Myanmar Orthopaedic Society established Dr. San Baw Research Fund to be used for "various research activities, primarily—but not solely—related to orthopedic research and training".

San Baw's work was forgotten internationally until the 2010s. A UK-based Polish orthopaedic surgeon Bartlomiej Szostakowski became interested in San Baw's career by accident, and in 2017, he and his two other colleagues from the Royal National Orthopaedic Hospital published a paper on ivory hemiarthroplasty that recounted the work and findings of San Baw and his team. The University of Pennsylvania Department of Orthopedic Surgery later agreed to hold annual lectures in Dr. San Baw's memory after Myint Zan made a donation to the school. In 2018, at the inaugural Dr. San Baw GM’58 Honorary Lecture in Orthopedic Innovation, Dr. Szostakowski gave the inaugural lecture, "Dr. San Baw: The Forgotten Innovator in Orthopedic Biologic Reconstruction". According to Myint Zan, the school will hold the lecture annually "in perpetuity". Myint Zan also established the San Baw, MD, GM’58 Memorial Fund in Palliative Oncology in support of Palliative Care at Penn Medicine.

== Bibliography ==
- Boden, Lauren (29 November 2018), Inaugural San Baw, MD Honorary Lecture in Orthopaedic Innovation Dr. Bartek Szostakowski (PDF), pp. 41–42
- Burma Medical Association (1984), In Memoriam, Dr. U San Baw (1922–1984) (PDF), Burma Medical Association
- Khin Thet Hta; Khin Khin Win; Htay Htay Aye; Mya Tu (2005), Who's who in Health and Medicine in Myanmar, Ministry of Health, Myanmar
- Myint Swe, Wunna Kyawhtin Dr. (2014), The Japanese Era Rangoon General Hospital: Memoir of a Wartime Physician, translated by Zarny Tun (1st ed.), Yangon: Myanmar Book Centre, ISBN 978-99971-852-9-7
- Myint Zan (7 December 2019), "Remembering a Myanmar Surgical Pioneer", The Irrawaddy
- Penn Medicine News (4 May 2015), Penn Medicine's Global Reach to the Far East, Penn Medicine
- Penn Medicine News (3 January 2019), Honoring an Orthopaedic Pioneer, Penn Medicine
- Seidler, Jodi (27 June 2011), History of Hip Replacements, Hipster Club
- Stafford, Ned (25 October 2014), "Myint Myint Khin: Legendary Burmese doctor and teacher, and later a poet" (PDF), British Medical Journal, p. 24
- Stiles, Daniel (19 November 2002), Ivory Carving in Myanmar, Asian Art
- Szostakowski, Bartek; Jagiello, Jakub; Skinner, John A. (13 September 2017), "Ivory Hemiarthroplasty: The Forgotten Concept Lives On", Clinical Orthopaedics and Related Research, 475 (12), Springer: 2850–2854, doi:10.1007/s11999-017-5497-0, PMC 5670068, PMID 28905301
- USIS (15 October 1969), Special USIS News Release: Surgeons Hear of U San Baw's Success with Ivory Bones (PDF), United States Information Agency
- Yan Pai (20 June 2014), "Myint Myint Khin, Well-Known Doctor and Writer, Dead at 91", The Irrawaddy
