= Myint Myint Khin (writer) =

Burmese physician, educator, and writer

Myint Myint Khin FRCP
- မြင့်မြင့်ခင်

3rd Head of the Department of Medicine, Institute of Medicine, Mandalay
- In office 1965–1984
- Preceded by: P.R. Mohan
- Succeeded by: Khin Maung Win

Personal details
- Born: Myint Myint Khin; 15 December 1923; Saturday, 8th waxing of Nadaw 1285 ME Bassein (Pathein), Irrawaddy Division, British Burma
- Died: 19 June 2014 (aged 90); Thursday, 7th waning of Nayon 1376 ME Yangon, Yangon Region, Myanmar
- Spouse: San Baw (m. 1953; died 1984)
- Children: Myint Zan
- Education: University of Rangoon (BA); Faculty of Medicine, University of Rangoon (MBBS); University of Pennsylvania (MD); Royal College of Physicians of Edinburgh (FRCP)
- Alma mater: University of Rangoon; University of Pennsylvania

Myint Myint Khin FRCP (Burmese: မြင့်မြင့်ခင်, pronounced [mjɪ̰ɰ̃ mjɪ̰ɰ̃ kʰɪ̀ɰ̃]; 15 December 1923 – 19 June 2014) was a Burmese medical professor and writer. An English major at the University of Rangoon, she was the chair of the Department of Medicine of the Institute of Medicine, Mandalay from 1965 to 1984, and served as a consultant at the World Health Organization from 1985 to 1991. Her literary career began in 1996, spurred on by the HIV/AIDS crisis in the country. She published 11 books in Burmese and two in English. At the time of her death, the former professor was collaborating on an English language book on the history of medical education in the country.

Most of her books dealt with public health and medicine. One notable exception was her last published book in 2013, Poetry for Me, a collection of her English language poetry, which she began working on after the death of her husband Dr. San Baw, a hip replacement pioneer, in 1984. Through her books and interviews, she advocated for more openness and transparency in the country, and spoke out about the regression of women's rights in Myanmar. In 2012, she founded a daycare center for elderly physicians in Yangon.

== Early life and education ==
Myint Myint Khin was born on 15 December 1923 in Bassein (Pathein), in the Irrawaddy delta in British Burma. The oldest of three siblings, she grew up in the nearby delta town of Henzada (Hinthada), before moving to Rangoon (Yangon) as a teenager. She was not yet 15 when she enrolled at the University of Rangoon in 1938 to study English literature, and there she became "obsessed" by the works of poet John Donne.

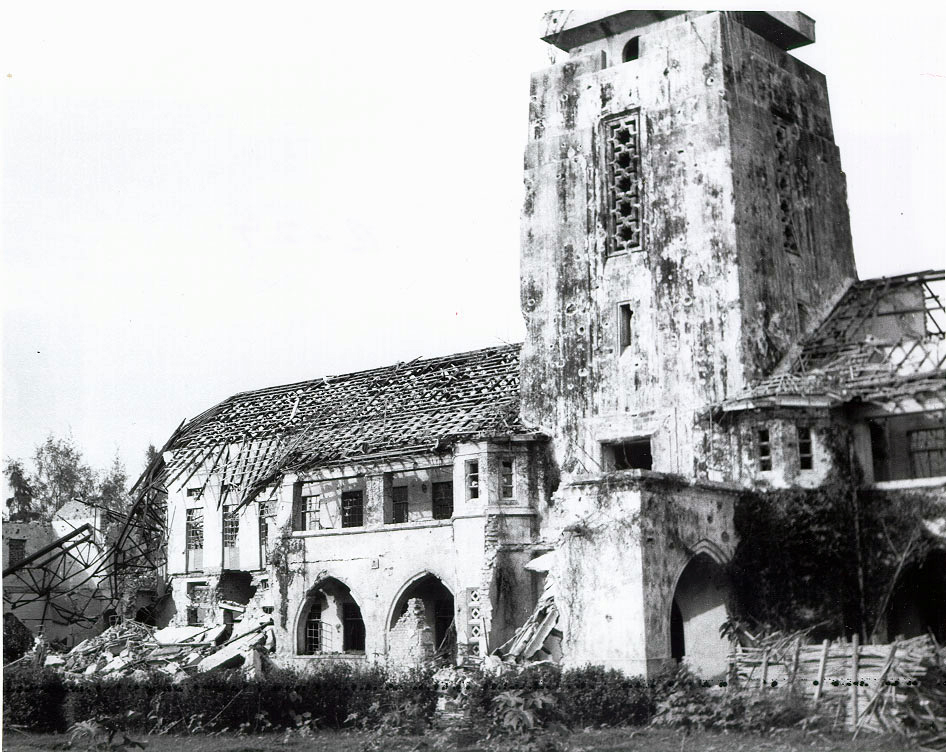
Abandoned University of Rangoon during World War II

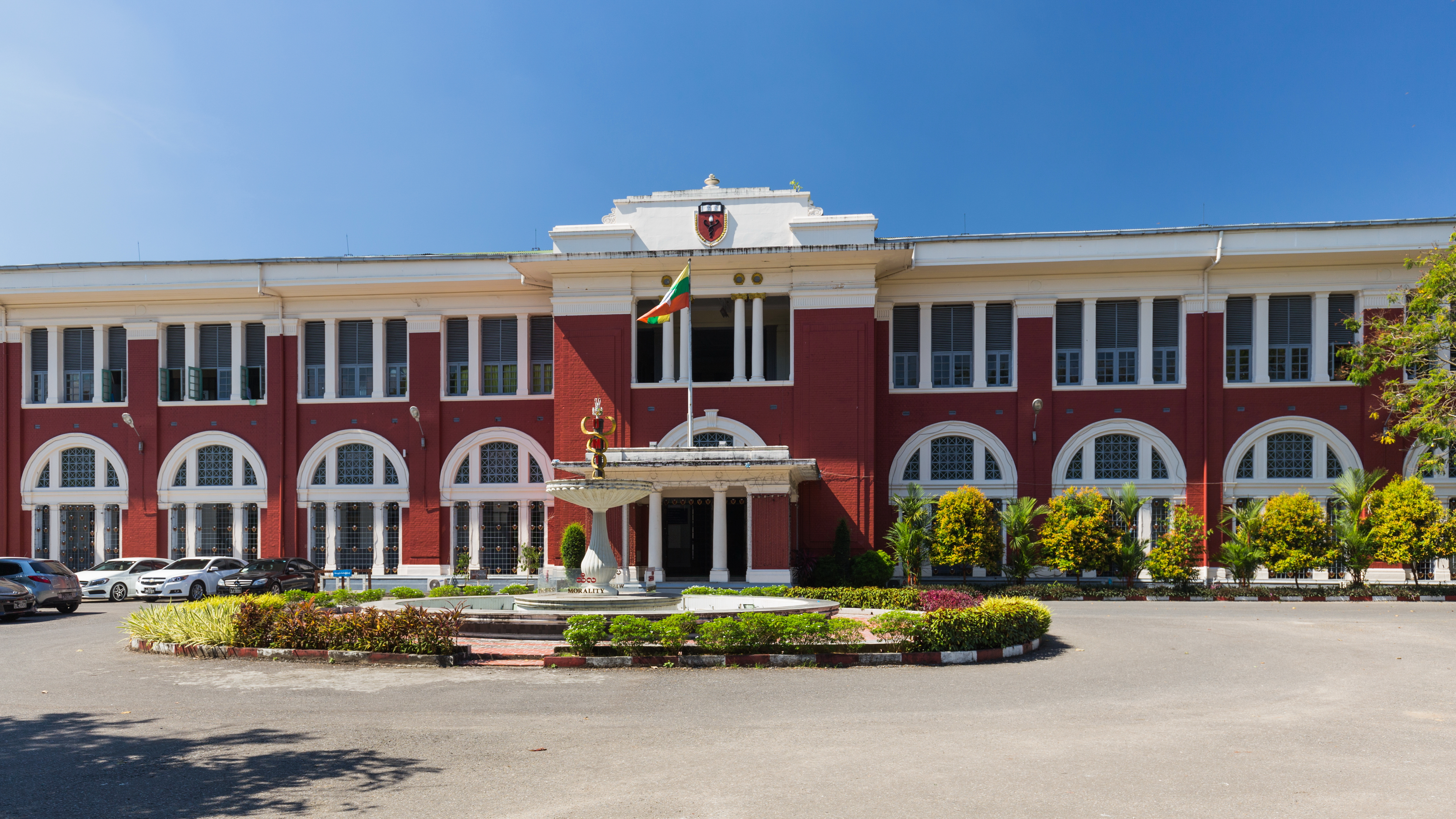
Faculty of Medicine of University of Rangoon; now University of Medicine 1, Yangon

However, her studies were interrupted by the arrival of World War II in 1941. In a 2013 interview, she said that the war years were a time of "tremendous adversity" and "anguish" during which she lost her mother and brother, and her family lost their property. Her brother was killed by a bomb, and she had to go and retrieve her dead brother's body. Furthermore, the loss of property caused "fears and insecurities in the aftermath of World War II".

Yet it was also the war that got her into medicine. With all the colleges in the country shut down, she enrolled at the only university level school opened during the Japanese occupation: the wartime medical school founded by Drs. Ba Than, S. Sen and Yin May in 1943. (Note: In (Kyu Kyu Swe 2009: 119), Myint Myint Khin wrote that she was one of the few students who enrolled at the wartime medical school "under the tutelage of Sayagyi U Ba Than". Per (Myint Swe 2014: 105–106), Drs. Ba Than, Sen, and Yin May were co-founders of the wartime medical and nursing schools.) After the war, she completed her original major, receiving a BA in English literature in 1946, and then promptly continued her medical education at the just reopened Faculty of Medicine, graduating with an MBBS in 1950.

== Medical career ==
=== Early years ===
Though Myint Myint Khin got into medicine by happenstance, she excelled at it. After starting out as a staff physician (Civil Assistant Surgeon) at Rangoon General Hospital in 1950, she did her residency at the University of Pennsylvania medical school, and received an MD in 1955. She graduated ahead of her husband San Baw, the medical school classmate she married in 1953 who received an MD and an MS in 1958, also from Penn Medicine. Meanwhile, she finished her training abroad by getting her FRCP from the Royal College of Physicians of Edinburgh.

=== Mandalay years ===
Back in Burma, she was appointed Clinical Professor of Medicine at the Faculty of Medicine of Mandalay University in 1960, (Note: (Stafford 2014: 24) names the medical school as the Institute of Medicine, Mandalay in 1960 but per (Khin Thet-Hta et al 2005: 12), the medical school was then the Faculty of Medicine of the University of Mandalay until 1964.) joining her husband who had been chief of orthopedic surgery at Mandalay General Hospital since 1957. In 1965, she was promoted to be the head of the Department of Medicine, becoming the first woman chair at the school. According to a 1967 BMJ article, she was the only female head of Department of Medicine in the country's three medical schools at the time. (Note: (Stafford 2014: 24) quoting a 1967 BMJ article says she was "the lone female professor of general medicine the three Burmese medical schools." While Stafford and the BMJ are technically correct, she was not the only female department head of at the medical schools then. Professor Khin Si was chair of the department of Obstetrics and Gynecology of the Institute of Medicine 1, Rangoon from 1959 to 1976. Per (Tin Naing Toe 2011), the first female department chair in Burma was Dr. Yin May, who was chair of the Department of Obstetrics and Gynecology from 1946 to 1959.)

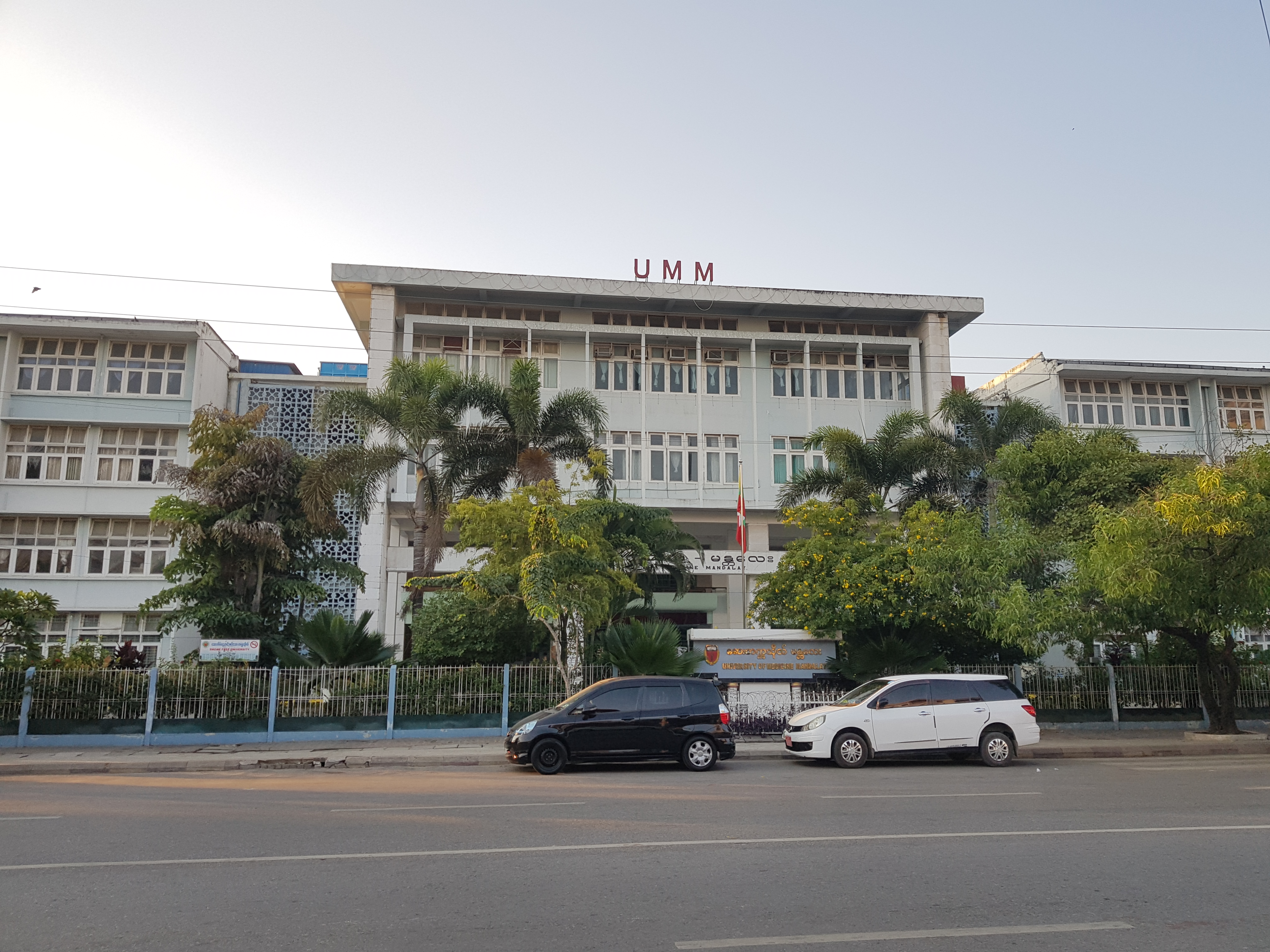
University of Medicine, Mandalay

She was widely respected by her colleagues and her students. According to Prof. Myint Myint Aye, the retired head of the Department of Medicine at the Institute of Medicine, Mandalay (1987–1990), her elder colleague was "widely respected for her excellent lectures and informative clinical bedside teachings", and "she recruited young graduates with promising potential and built the strongest department of medicine in Burma which produced hundreds and thousands of doctors meeting the international standard. These doctors are now not only serving Burma, but all over the world.” She is remembered as an inspirational and "towering figure" by her students, who affectionately called her "Mummy Gyi" ("elder mummy"), while Prof. Myint Myint Aye was known as "Mummy Lay" ("younger mummy".) Myint Myint Khin's description of herself was harsher: a demanding professor who could come across as "aggressive" and "abrasive".

She retired abruptly after the death of her husband of 31 years on 7 December 1984. Still in mourning, she was greeted with more bad news less than three months later. Their only son Myint Zan, who had returned from Los Angeles to see his dying father, was locked up in political detention without charge and trial by the BSPP government. (Note: (The Law Quadrangle 2018): According to Myint Zan, he became a persona non grata of the Burmese government after enrolling at the University of Michigan Law School without having received permission from the government, which subsequently revoked his passport. Unable to go anywhere else, he stayed in the US after law school, taking on menial jobs to survive as a stateless person before finally returning to see his dying father.) He was placed in solitary confinement in the notorious Insein Prison, and given no contact with the outside world, including his mother.

=== Career abroad ===
Now "mired in a deep personal crisis", Myint Myint Khin left the country. She first took up a post as a visiting professor of medicine at the National University of Malaysia. After a few months, she moved to New Delhi to become a consultant in the World Health Organization’s Southeast Asia regional office. She served for six years on the WHO panel of experts in health manpower development, before retiring in 1991.

== Literary career ==
It was during the years abroad that she began writing English language poetry. In a 2013 interview, she said she began writing poetry "because I could not bear not to write them" as an outlet from her personal crises. Later, she was inspired to write more poetry after visiting Sri Lanka when she was struck by the country's natural beauty. She said that she kept her love for poetry a secret from everyone including her husband and son; she continued that given her no non-sense public persona, her students would have been surprised by her "sentimental and emotive" side.

"We have to recognize first that there is a problem and then figure out how to resolve it. You can’t deny the epidemic by saying that it is no way possible in Burmese or Asian culture, and it is coming from Western countries. This makes the problem worse."

— Myint Myint Khin in 2004 on the HIV/AIDS crisis in Myanmar

At any rate, her first published book came amidst the HIV/AIDS crisis in Myanmar. (She had written for the Myanmar Medical Journal, and developed handbooks and audio tapes as study aids for medical students.) In 1996, she published The Bells Tolling for Everyone, which calls attention to the menace of HIV/AIDS on the country. Frustrated by the dismissive attitude of the officials, and the low reported percentage of HIV infections in the country, she called for an expansion of general health education with "openness and transparency". To her, "the beginning of secrecy is the end of the truth." She followed up with books on topics such as cancer, diabetes, and heart disease as well as her vision on the development of medicine in the country.

It was only in 2013 that the then 89-year-old former English major published her first English poetry book Poetry for Me. Her poetry often focused on her late husband. One such example is as follows:

But close to my heart is a treasure trove,
To draw upon if I chose
Happiness shared, joys that glow
And tenderness, I only know

It turned out to be her last published book. In all, between 1996 and 2013, she published 11 books in Burmese and two in English. At her time of death, she was working on an English language book A History of Medical Education in Burma in collaboration with other physicians to tell the history of medical education in Myanmar from the colonial period to the present.

== Activism ==
"Our womanhood has fallen so far behind. We were once admired by our sisters in the West because of our cultural liberty, and for the freedoms that did not exist in the West at the time. But in the current state, the position of Burmese women does not reflect our traditional culture...

...This is a military-made culture; this is not Burmese culture. It is an embarrassment for us. Patriarchy has succeeded in recent years. We are now truly backward."

— Myint Myint Khin in 2006 on the state of women's rights in Myanmar

Myint Myint Khin maintained an active life until the last four months of her life. She also continued to voice her opinions strongly. According to Thane-Oke Kyaw Myint, a retired paediatrician and founder of the Alumni Myanmar Institutes of Medicine Association (AMIMA), "she had openly written articles in the newspapers on what was wrong with educational systems in Burma, never hesitating to openly criticise the present and the past governments, a stand that very few of us could or dare to do so publicly". For example, in 2004, she gave an interview to The Irrawaddy, then an exile run media outlet, in which she, quoting Orwell, highlighted the general lack of openness and transparency in the country as the root of many of its problems.

She also spoke out about women's rights. She bemoaned the "truly backward" state of women's rights under the military regimes, away from the traditional Burmese culture. She wrote about the importance of general education, particularly literacy among women, for example to combat the HIV/AIDS crisis. She maintained that "The literacy rate among women influences a household’s health and even life style. You ought to invest in women."

She was a member of the Myanmar Medical Association, and once served as president of the Mandalay chapter, and twice on its board. In 2012, in association with the MMA and the Myint Myint Khin Foundation, she founded "Support Group for Elderly Doctors", which began operating a daycare center for elderly physicians in Tamwe Township, Yangon. Funded by the donations and free services of other physicians, many of whom were her former students, the center provided a place for elder physicians aged 70 and over, not all of whom were well off financially, to socialize as well as receive free medical checkups.

== Personal life ==
Myint Myint Khin was married to her medical school classmate San Baw from 1953 to his death in 1984. As chief of orthopedic surgery at Mandalay General Hospital, San Baw "pioneered the use of ivory hip prostheses to replace ununited fractures of the neck of the femur." (Note: (Khin Thet Hta et al 2005: 513): Professor Dr. San Baw (29 June 1922 – 7 December 1984), son of Thaw Zan and Si Si, born in Tapun, Tharrawaddy. University of Rangoon (MBBS), University of Pennsylvania (MS). Chief orthopedic surgeon, Mandalay General Hospital.) Their only child Myint Zan is a former professor of law, who taught at universities in Malaysia, Australia, the South Pacific and the United States from 1989 to 2016.

== Death ==
Myint Myint Khin died on 19 June 2014 in Yangon. She had been receiving treatment for heart and kidney failures during the past four months. She was 90. (Note: As seen in (Yan Pai 2014), her age at death is reported as 91 in Myanmar, using Burmese age reckoning—i.e. she was in her 91st year.)

== Bibliography ==
- AS (Spring–Summer 2018), "Paying It Forward After Paying A Steep Price", The Law Quadrangle, University of Michigan
- Aye Aye Chit (6 March 2019), IWD 2019: "Always keep balance between peace and principle throughout our life", Royal College of Physicians
- The Irrawaddy (December 2004), Prof Dr Myint Myint Khin, The Irrawaddy
- Khin Mar Mar Kyi (24 June 2014), "We Called Her 'Mummy'", The Irrawaddy
- Khin Thet Hta; Khin Khin Win; Htay Htay Aye; Mya Tu (2005), Who's who in Health and Medicine in Myanmar, Ministry of Health, Myanmar
- Kyu Kyu Swe, Dr. Daw (2009), To Keep Alive Forever, Our Cherished Memories (PDF), University of Medicine, Mandalay Alumni Association
- Myint Swe, Wunna Kyawhtin Dr. (2014), The Japanese Era Rangoon General Hospital: Memoir of a Wartime Physician, translated by Zarny Tun (1st ed.), Yangon: Myanmar Book Centre, ISBN 978-99971-852-9-7
- Myint Zan (7 December 2019), "Remembering a Myanmar Surgical Pioneer", The Irrawaddy
- Myo Lwin; Lun Min Maung (18 August 2014), "Caring for the careers", The Myanmar Times
- Penn Medicine (4 May 2015), Penn Medicine's Global Reach to the Far East, University of Pennsylvania
- Stafford, Ned (25 October 2014), "Myint Myint Khin: Legendary Burmese doctor and teacher, and later a poet" (PDF), British Medical Journal, p. 24
- Szostakowski, Bartek; Jagiello, Jakub; Skinner, John A. (13 September 2017), "Ivory Hemiarthroplasty: The Forgotten Concept Lives On", Clinical Orthopaedics and Related Research, 475 (12), Springer: 2850–2854, doi:10.1007/s11999-017-5497-0, PMC 5670068, PMID 28905301
- Tin Naing Toe (30 October 2011), "ခေတ်မီ ခွဲစိတ်သားဖွားစနစ်စတင်ကျင့်သုံးသူ သီရိပျံချီ ဒေါက်တာ ဒေါ်ရင်မေ" [First Obstetrician Thiri Pyanchi Dr. Daw Yin May], Weekly Eleven (in Burmese)
- University of Medicine, Mandalay, Former Heads of Department of Medicine
- Yan Pai (20 June 2014), "Myint Myint Khin, Well-Known Doctor and Writer, Dead at 91", The Irrawaddy
- Zon Pann Pwint (18 March 2013), "Not paved with flowers: Turning loss into poetry", The Myanmar Times
