= Meriwether Lewis Anderson =

American physician

Dr. Meriwether Lewis Anderson (June 23, 1805 - March 5, 1862) was a prominent Virginia physician and politician.

Anderson was born at "Locust Hill" in Albemarle County, Virginia to Edmund Anderson and Jane Meriwether Lewis, the sister of Meriwether Lewis. He graduated from the University of Virginia and went on to get a degree in medicine from the University of Pennsylvania School of Medicine. After qualifying as a physician he moved to Mississippi to begin his practice and take up farming. Anderson returned to Virginia in 1837 upon inheriting his maternal grandmother's estate and became a well known and respected physician of the Piedmont region. His prominence in Albemarle county resulted in his election to the Virginia Legislature in 1861. Anderson died several months after his election in 1862.

Anderson married Lucy Sydnor Harper (1811–1885) in 1831; the daughter of Charles and Lucy Smither Harper. The couple had five children including Meriwether Lewis Anderson, Jr who was killed at the Battle of Fisher's Hill in 1864. The Andersons also adopted several nieces and nephews in addition to their own.

== Locust Hill ==
Anderson was born at Locust Hill the home of his grandmother Lucy Meriwether Lewis. The estate was acquired in 1730 by his great-grandfather Col. Robert Lewis. Anderson had spent most of his life at Locust Hill in part due to his fathers inadequacies in business. He inherited the property on the death of his grandmother in 1837 shortly after which the main house burned down. Anderson is responsible for the current house which stands at Locust Hill today. The estate is also the birthplace of his uncle Meriwether Lewis.

== Ancestry ==
Ancestors of Meriwether Lewis Anderson

Robert Anderson
Robert Anderson
Cecelia Massie
David Anderson
William Overton
Mary Overton
Mary Waters
Edmund Anderson
Nicholas Mills
Elizabeth Mills
William Clopton
Ann Clopton
Ann Booth
Dr. Meriwether Lewis Anderson
"Councillor" John Lewis
Col. Robert Lewis
Elizabeth Warner
Lt. William Lewis
Nicholas Meriwether II
Jane Meriwether
Elizabeth Crawford
Jane Meriwether Lewis
William Meriwether
Col. Thomas Meriwether
Elizabeth Bushrod
Lucy Meriwether
Francis Thornton
Elizabeth Thornton
Mary Taliaferro
