= Joshua A. Hirsch =

American interventional pain specialist

Joshua A. Hirsch (born 1969) is an American interventional pain management physician and radiologist. He specialises in percutaneous vertebroplasty, percutaneous sacroplasty, and minimally invasive spine surgery. Hirsch performs balloon-assisted kyphoplasty and has been credited as performing the first combined percutaneous vertebroplasty/kyphoplasty in Boston. Hirsch has served as chief of minimally invasive spine surgery, director of interventional neuroradiology, chief of the Interventional Spine Service, vice chair of interventional radiology quality and safety and associate departmental quality chair at Massachusetts General Hospital.

He is an alumnus of Touro College (B.A., 1987). In 1991, at the age of 21, he was the youngest person in modern history to graduate from Perelman School of Medicine at the University of Pennsylvania. In addition to practicing, Hirsch is an associate professor at Harvard Medical School and is a founding editor of the Journal of NeuroInterventional Surgery, where he serves on the editorial board.

Hirsch has published nearly 400 papers and many chapters in the peer-reviewed literature. In 2013, he and other members of the American Society of Interventional Pain Physicians (ASIPP) published epidural guidelines for interventional techniques in 2013, which has continuously been updated. Hirsch participated once again with ASIPP to publish Guidelines for Responsible Opioid Prescribing in Chronic Non-Cancer Pain.
