= Cystic Fibrosis Canada =

Canadian not-for-profit corporation

- Founded: 15 July 1960
- Type: Health Charity
- Registration no.: 10684-5100 RR0001
- Location(s): 2323 Yonge Street; Suite 800; Toronto, Ontario; M4P 2C9
- Region served: Canada
- Key people: President, Director-at-Large: Jim Mountai; Patron: Celine Dion; President and CEO: Kelly Grover
- Revenue: $16.8 million (2014)
- Volunteers: 50 chapters
- Website: cysticfibrosis.ca

Cystic Fibrosis Canada is one of national charitable but not-for-profit corporation established in 1960. Cystic Fibrosis Canada's mandate is to help individuals with cystic fibrosis, principally by funding cystic fibrosis research and care. The organization also provides educational materials for the cystic fibrosis community and the general public; undertakes advocacy initiatives with, and on behalf of Canadians with cystic fibrosis, and raises funds to support its programs.

== Mission ==
Cystic Fibrosis Canada raises funds in order to promote public awareness, along with supporting research and high-quality cystic fibrosis care.

== Research and care ==
Cystic Fibrosis Canada's primary objective is to fund CF research and care: the organization annually funds approximately 50 research projects, in addition to scholars, post-doctoral fellows, and students undertaking CF investigations. Each year, Cystic Fibrosis Canada awards more than $7 million in grants to CF researchers, and approximately $2 million in grants to the 42 CF clinics, and five transplant centres across the country.

To help ensure consistent, high-quality care across the country, Cystic Fibrosis Canada provides support to clinicians through grants, training awards and access to statistical information through the online Canadian Cystic Fibrosis Registry.

Canadian researchers are viewed as leaders in the global effort to find a cure or control for cystic fibrosis. In 1989, Canadian researchers, funded by Cystic Fibrosis Canada, discovered the gene responsible for cystic fibrosis, and they continue to play a leading role in developing new treatments.

== Publications ==
As well as general information about cystic fibrosis in Canada, and resources for teachers, parents, and health care professionals, Cystic Fibrosis Canada publishes newsletters and reports covering such areas as research and training grants, clinical services and annual data on patients with cystic fibrosis.

== Kin Canada ==
Since 1964, Kin Canada, a Canadian service organisation, has supported Cystic Fibrosis Canada, raising over $42 million in support of cystic fibrosis research and care.

== See also ==
- Shinerama
- List of cystic fibrosis organizations
- Cystic Fibrosis Foundation
- Cystic Fibrosis Trust
