= Emily's Entourage =

US nonprofit organization

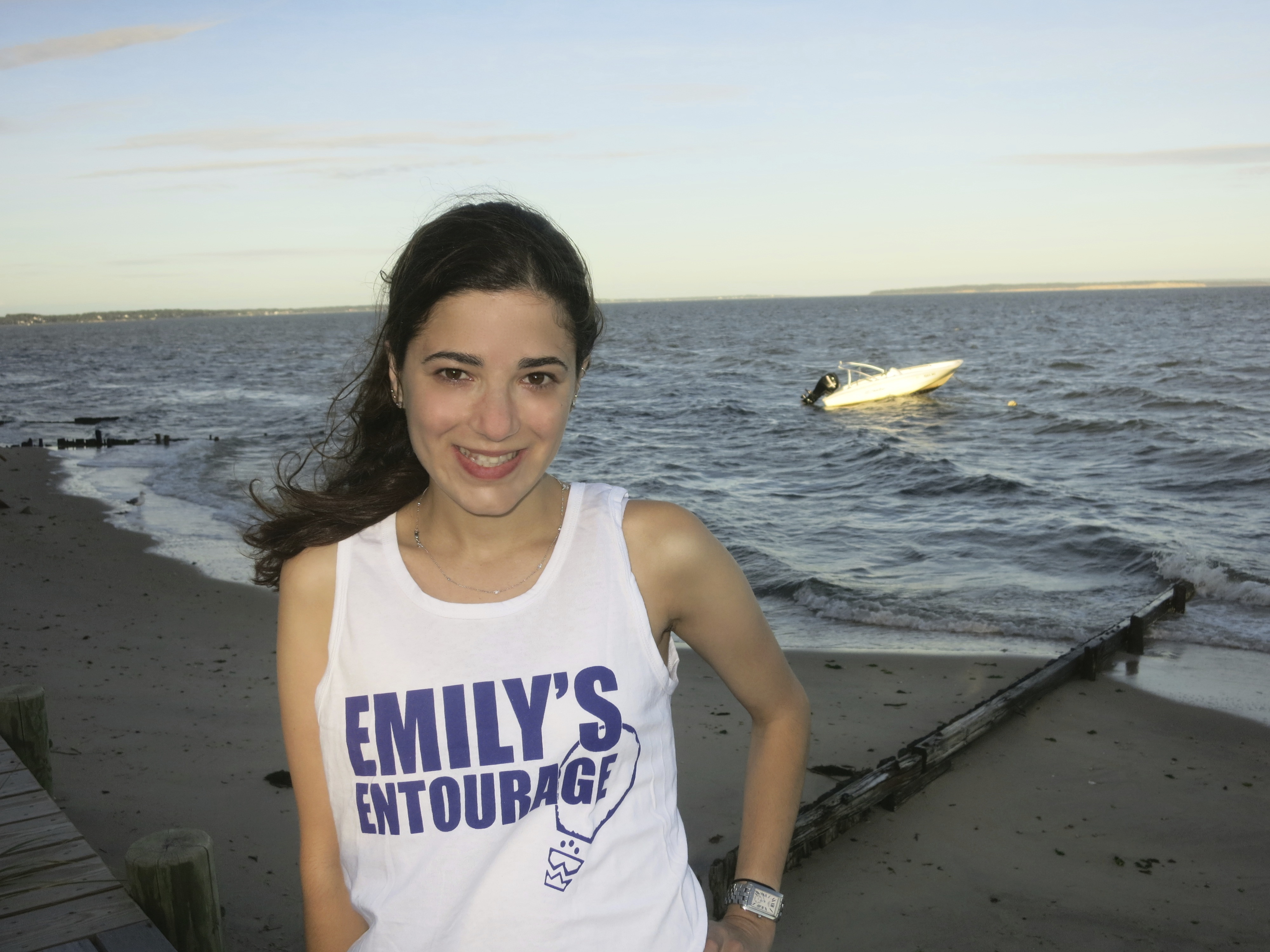
- Founder: Emily Kramer-Golinkoff
- Registration no.: 45-3768161
- Purpose: Accelerating cystic fibrosis research to save lives through the power of community, with a focus on "nonsense" mutations
- Location: Merion Station, Pennsylvania
- Website: emilysentourage.org

Emily's Entourage is a nonprofit organization that raises money and awareness to help find a cure for rare ("nonsense") mutations of cystic fibrosis (CF), a genetic disorder that generally affects a person's lungs and digestive system. The foundation has raised over $1 million, largely from viral fundraising through universities and video campaigns. The organization also participates in exploratory research initiatives aimed at understanding and advancing towards a cure.

Emily's Entourage is named after Emily Kramer-Golinkoff, a woman with CF, who has been the focus of an increased trend of patients participating deeply in research on and advocacy for their own conditions. She was honored at the White House as a Champion of Change for "harnessing data to take account individual differences in people's genes, environments, and lifestyles into account to improve patients' health."

== Personal background ==
Kramer-Golinkoff was born on January 9, 1985. At six weeks old, she was diagnosed with CF. At a young age, her mother, Liza, would pound "on her chest for 45 minutes to loosen the mucus in her lungs."

In 2012, her lungs were described as functioning at about one third of the normal lung function. Emily undergoes a daily regimen of three to four hours of "airway clearance and breathing treatments" in addition to taking approximately 30 pills and four shots of insulin.

Kramer-Golinkoff has a rare form of CF with a high prevalence among Ashkenazi Jews. Her mutation belongs to a larger category called nonsense mutations, which affects approximately 10% of CF cases worldwide and accounts for up to 30% of genetic diseases more broadly.

She graduated in 2003 from Lower Merion High School in Ardmore, Pennsylvania. She graduated cum laude from the University of Pennsylvania's Annenberg School for Communication and then completed her master's degree in bioethics at the University of Pennsylvania Perelman School of Medicine in 2009.

== Emily's Entourage ==
Emily's Entourage was founded by Kramer-Golinkoff, her friends, and her family in December 2011 when Kramer-Golinkoff and her family sent a video to their friends and family and it raised over $40,000 in one week. College campuses around the country have joined the movement by forming official clubs on campus and throwing annual fundraising benefits. Local groups, such as Lower Merion School District often volunteer with Emily's Entourage.

By May 2015, Emily's Entourage had raised over $1 million.

== Research ==
Emily's Entourage has a Scientific Advisory Board to "set research priorities and vet, approve, and oversee research projects" for the organization. In January 2014 Emily's Entourage hosted a research symposium on nonsense mutations in CF with a focus on Kramer-Golinkoff's particular rare mutation with leading researchers from biotech, academia, pharma and the Cystic Fibrosis Foundation in partnership with the Penn Orphan Disease Center to spur discovery of new treatments for those with nonsense CF mutations.

Kramer-Golinkoff also published "A Lesson in Participatory Research for a Rare Mutation of Cystic Fibrosis" in the Journal of General Internal Medicine. For her work towards finding new cures, she was honored at the White House as a "Champion of Change". The honor focused on "work being done by patients, researchers, innovators, and advocates who are advancing our understanding of health and disease by harnessing data to take account individual differences in people's genes, environments, and lifestyles into account to improve patients' health."

An NF1 clinical trial is undergoing FDA approval. Kramer-Golinkoff said, "I realized I could wait on the sidelines and pray for a miracle or get into the game and try to make one."

== Media ==
Kramer-Golinkoff and Emily's Entourage have received significant regional and national media coverage. The attention has driven donations as well research opportunities and public awareness. Philadelphia Magazine profiled Emily as a "Health Hero" in September 2015. Kramer-Golinkoff said, "My biggest motivations for working my hardest to stay as healthy as possible—even in the face of an advanced and progressing fatal illness—are my family and friends, this burning desire to do more things and see more places, and the unbelievable Entourage that rallied behind me to give me and so many others real, tangible hope for that chance." People magazine wrote, "Perhaps the most critical of Emily's Entourage's efforts has been its success in putting a beautiful face on an ugly issue. Case in point: The test tubes that fill the testing laboratories at USCF are all marked with random alphanumerical codes—except those marked with Emily's name."

In Philadelphia Style magazine Kramer-Golinkoff emphasized her organization's personal approach: "We're trying to use my story to humanize the disease... People really respond to faces and stories and families in a way that's different. There are so many important causes out there, but we can touch people's hearts by making them feel like I could be anyone's daughter or sister or best friend." Yahoo! Health profiled Kramer-Golinkoff. She said, "My disease is progressing and our race is getting more urgent. We're doing some really groundbreaking work that is changing the paradigm of how research is done, what gets attention, who the players are, and what the pace of progress is. We are constantly pushing the envelope because I literally don't have time to wait."

== See also ==
- List of cystic fibrosis organizations
