= Donald O'Rourke =

- Occupation: Neurosurgeon

Academic background
- Education: University of Pennsylvania

Donald M. O'Rourke is an American neurosurgeon and the John Templeton Jr., MD Professor of Neurosurgery at the Perelman School of Medicine at the University of Pennsylvania. He graduated from Harvard University (Magna Cum Laude) with an A.B. in Biochemistry and Molecular Biology in 1983, and attended medical school at the University of Pennsylvania (M.D., 1987) where he also completed neurosurgical residency training.

He established the institution's human brain tumor tissue bank in 2001. An elected member of the American Academy of Neurological Surgery, his research at the Translational Center of Excellence in the Abramson Cancer Center focuses on glioblastoma multiforme, especially the design and investigation of chimeric antigen receptor (CAR T-cell) immune therapies.

== CAR T cell therapy ==
As principal investigator, O'Rourke led the first-in-human trial using a single infusion of engineered autologous CAR T-Cells against epidermal growth factor receptor variant III (EGFRvIII) in glioblastoma.
