= Donald Tashkin =

American pulmonologist

Donald P. Tashkin is an American pulmonologist and professor of medicine at the University of California, Los Angeles, who has studied the effects of cannabis for over 30 years.

Tashkin earned his M.D. from the University of Pennsylvania School of Medicine in 1961.

== Career ==
Tashkin has spent 30 years studying cannabis. In 2006, he was in charge of a large case-control study on marijuana and the risk of cancer. Contrary to his group's expectations, the study found no increase in lung cancer risk even among heavy users of marijuana.
