= List of Sigma Pi Phi members =

Sigma Pi Phi, also known as The Boulé, is an African American professional fraternity. Founded in Philadelphia, Pennsylvania, in 1904, it is the oldest Greek lettered fraternity for African Americans. The fraternity does not have collegiate chapters and is designed for professionals in mid-career or older. Sigma Pi Phi has over 5,000 members and 139 chapters throughout the United States, the United Kingdom, and The Bahamas. Following are some of the notable members of Sigma Pi Phi.

== Academia ==
=== Presidents and chancellors ===
- Calvin O. Butts, president of State University of New York College at Old Westbury
- Samuel Dubois Cook, president of Dillard University
- John Warren Davis, president of West Virginia State College
- Lewis C. Dowdy, president and first chancellor of North Carolina Agricultural and Technical State University
- Michael V. Drake, president of the University of California, president of Ohio State University, and chancellor of the University of California, Irvine
- Norman Francis, president of Xavier University
- Robert Michael Franklin Jr., president of Morehouse College
- Antoine Garibaldi, president emeritus, University of Detroit Mercy
- William R. Harvey, president of Hampton University
- Frederick S. Humphries, president of Tennessee State University and Florida A&M University
- Charles S. Johnson, president of Fisk University
- Michael Lomax, president and CEO of the United Negro College Fund and president of Dillard University
- Samuel P. Massie, president of North Carolina Central University and the only black scientist attached to the Manhattan Project
- Benjamin Mays, president of Morehouse College, first dean of the School of Religion at Howard University, and leader credited with laying the intellectual foundations of the American civil rights movement
- J. Keith Motley, chancellor emeritus of the University of Massachusetts Boston
- Samuel L. Myers Sr., president of Bowie State University
- Benjamin F. Payton, president of Benedict College and Tuskegee University
- Gregory J. Vincent, president of Talladega College, Hobart College, and William Smith College
- Charles H. Wesley, president of Wilberforce University and founding president of Central State University
- Clifton R. Wharton Jr., first black American president of a major university, president of Michigan State University, chancellor University of New York (SUNY) System, and United States Deputy Secretary of State
- Albert N. Whiting, president and chancellor of North Carolina College (now North Carolina Central University)

=== Faculty ===
- David Blackwell, statistician, mathematician, and professor at the University of California, Berkeley
- John Hope Franklin, chair of history at Duke University
- Ernest Everett Just, first head of the Department of Zoology at Howard University
- Makau Mutua, professor at the SUNY Buffalo School of Law
- Ivory A. Toldson, professor of Counseling Psychology at Howard University and author
- Walter Washington, professor at Alcorn State University
- Carter G. Woodson, historian and professor at Howard University and West Virginia State University, author, and the founder of the Association for the Study of African American Life and History

== Activism and civil rights ==
- W. E. B. Du Bois, Niagara Movement leader and one of the founders of the NAACP
- Lafayette M. Hershaw, civil rights activist
- James Weldon Johnson, leader of the NAACP, diplomat, and writer of the "Black National Anthem"
- Vernon Jordan, lawyer and civil rights activist
- Martin Luther King Jr., minister and civil rights leader
- Franklin McCain, civil rights activist and member of the Greensboro Four
- Walter White, executive secretary of the NAACP
- Roy Wilkins, executive director of the NAACP
- Whitney Young, executive director of the National Urban League

== Art and architecture ==
- Moneta Sleet Jr., 1969 winner of the Pulitzer Prize for Feature Photography, press photographer best known for his work as a staff photographer for Ebony
- Cecil J. Williams, photographer best known for documenting the civil rights movement in South Carolina
- Paul R. Williams, architect
- Hale Woodruff, artist

== Business ==
- Walter Braithwaite, engineer and executive for Boeing
- Cassius F. Butts, business executive and two-time United States Presidential Appointee
- Kenneth Chenault, a CEO of American Express
- Percy Creuzot, restaurateur who founded Frenchy's Chicken
- Lawrence Hamlar, civic leader, businessman, and philanthropist in Roanoke, Virginia
- Norman O. Houston, president of Golden State Mutual Life Insurance Company
- H. Claude Hudson, dentist and co-founder of Broadway Federal Savings and Loan Association (now Broadway Federal Bank)

== Entertainment ==
- Leon Bibb, news anchor and commentator for WKYC
- Wynton Marsalis, jazz musician and president of Jazz at Lincoln Center
- Hill Harper, actor
- Ulysses Kay, neoclassical music composer
- Billy Taylor, jazz pianist, composer, broadcaster, and educator
- Olly Wilson, composer of contemporary classical music, pianist, double bassist, and a musicologist

== Law ==
- Hubert Thomas Delany, Assistant U.S. Attorney and the first African American appointed as Tax Commissioner of New York
- Richard Erwin, chief judge of the United States District Court for the Middle District of North Carolina
- Jack Greenberg, succeeded Thurgood Marshall as the leader of the NAACP Legal Defense and Educational Fund, Inc.
- Roger Gregory, circuit judge of the United States Court of Appeals for the Fourth Circuit
- William H. Hastie, Senior Judge of the United States Court of Appeals for the Third Circuit and Governor of the United States Virgin Islands
- A. Leon Higginbotham Jr., chief judge of the United States Court of Appeals for the Third Circuit
- Eric Holder, United States Attorney General
- Perry B. Jackson, Ohio's first elected judge who was African American
- Morris Overstreet, judge of the Texas Court of Criminal Appeals
- Richard W. Roberts, senior district judge of the United States District Court for the District of Columbia
- Robert Heberton Terrell, justice of the peace in Washington, D.C. and a judge to the District of Columbia Municipal Court
- James Andrew Wynn, judge of the United States Court of Appeals for the Fourth Circuit

== Literature and journalism ==
- Arna Bontemps, poet and novelist
- Lawrence Otis Graham, author of 14 non-fiction books about politics, education, race, and class in America
- Earl G. Graves Sr., founder of Black Enterprise magazine
- John H. Johnson, founder of Johnson Publishing Company, which created of Ebony and Jet

== Military ==
- Lloyd Austin, former United States Secretary of Defense
- Ernest James Harrell, Commanding General of Europe division for the U.S. Army Corps of Engineers
- William J. Walker, retired United States Army major general and former Sergeant at Arms of the U.S. House of Representatives
- William E. Ward, retired United States Army three-star general
- Johnnie E. Wilson, United States Army four-star general who served as Commanding General, United States Army Materiel Command

== Politics and government ==
- Calvin Ball, Executive of Howard County
- Stephen K. Benjamin, director of the White House Office of Public Engagement
- Ted Berry, Mayor of Cincinnati
- Ken Blackwell, Secretary of State of Ohio, Treasurer of Ohio, and Mayor of Cincinnati
- Tom Bradley, Mayor of Los Angeles
- Andrew Brimmer, economist, chair of the District of Columbia Financial Control Board, and member of the Federal Reserve Board of Governors
- Lee P. Brown, Mayor of Houston, Police Commissioner of New York City, and Police Chief of Houston
- Ron Brown, United States Secretary of Commerce and Chair of the Democratic National Committee
- Ralph Bunche, a United Nations Ambassador and first African-American winner of the Nobel Peace Prize
- Jim Clyburn, member of the U.S. House of Representatives
- Lawrence D. Crawford, Mayor of Saginaw, Michigan
- Elijah Cummings, United States House of Representatives and Maryland House of Delegates
- David Dinkins, Mayor of New York City
- William T. Francis, U.S. Minister Resident/Consul General in Liberia
- W. Wilson Goode Jr., former member of the Philadelphia City Council
- Fred Gray, Alabama House of Representatives
- Alphonso Jackson, United States Secretary of Housing and Urban Development
- Maynard Jackson, Mayor of Atlanta
- Jeh Johnson, United States Secretary of Homeland Security
- Bernard Kincaid, Mayor of Birmingham, Alabama
- John Lewis, United States House of Representatives
- Kweisi Mfume, United States House of Representatives
- Oliver Randolph, New Jersey General Assembly
- Charles Rangel, United States House of Representatives
- Bobby Scott, United States House of Representatives and Virginia Senate
- Josiah T. Settle, Mississippi House of Representatives
- C. O. Simpkins, Louisiana House of Representatives
- Raphael Warnock, United States Senator and Pastor of Ebenezer Baptist Church
- Mel Watt, United States House of Representatives and director of the Federal Housing Finance Agency, and North Carolina Senate
- Robert C. Weaver, first United States Secretary of Housing and Urban Development
- Douglas Wilder, Governor of Virginia
- Andrew Young, U.S. Ambassador to the United Nations and mayor of Atlanta

== Religion ==
- Nathan D. Baxter, 10th bishop of the Episcopal Diocese of Central Pennsylvania
- Edgar Amos Love, Bishop with the Methodist Episcopal Church and founder of Omega Psi Phi
- Otis Moss III, pastor of Trinity United Church of Christ

== Science and medicine ==
- Claudius Ballard, prominent physician in Los Angeles, California
- Charles R. Drew, physician and medical researcher in the field of blood transfusions
- Frederick D. Gregory, astronaut and 10th NASA Deputy Administrator
- Edwin C. J. T. Howard, physician and one of the first black graduates of Harvard Medical School, who helped established Frederick Douglass Memorial Hospital and Training School and Mercy Hospital
- Algernon B. Jackson, prominent African American physician, surgeon, writer, and columnist
- Percy Lavon Julian, search chemist and a pioneer in the chemical synthesis of medicinal drugs from plants
- Henry McKee Minton, pharmacist, doctor, and superintendent of the Mercy Hospital of Philadelphia
- Frederick Douglass Stubbs, pioneering thoracic surgeon
- William J. Thompkins, physician and superintendent of the Old General Hospital in Kansas City, Missouri and Recorder of Deeds for the District of Columbia
- John P. Turner, chief of surgery and staff president of the Frederick Douglass Memorial Hospital and Training School
- J. Ernest Wilkins Jr., nuclear scientist, mechanical engineer and mathematician
- Daniel Hale Williams, founder of Provident Hospital and cardiologist known for being the first to perform a successful heart surgery

== Sports ==
- Hank Aaron, professional baseball player
- Arthur Ashe, professional tennis player who won three Grand Slam titles
- Clarence Gaines, men's basketball coach at Winston-Salem State University
- Tracy Porter, former professional football player for the Detroit Lions and Baltimore/Indianapolis Colts
- John Baxter Taylor Jr., the first African-American to win an Olympic Gold Medal
- Dwayne Woodruff, former professional football player for the Pittsburgh Steelers and judge of the Court of Common Pleas in Allegheny County, Pennsylvania
