= Frederick Douglass Stubbs =

African American thoracic surgeon (1906–1947)

- Born: March 16, 1906; Wilmington, Delaware, US
- Died: February 9, 1947 (aged 40); Long Island City, New York, US
- Education: Dartmouth College; Harvard Medical School
- Occupation: Thoracic surgeon
- Employer(s): Frederick Douglass Memorial Hospital; Mercy Hospital; Philadelphia General Hospital; Jefferson Hospital; Hahnemann Hospital; Philadelphia Health Center
- Spouse: Marion Turner Stubbs

Frederick Douglass Stubbs (March 16, 1906 – February 9, 1947) was one of the first Harvard-trained Black doctors and became the first African American thoracic surgeon. He was "one of the country’s greatest young surgeons" noted for his advancements in treating pulmonary tuberculosis.

== Early life ==
Frederick Douglass Stubbs was born in Wilmington, Delaware on March 16, 1906. His parents were Florence Blanche (née Williams) and J. Bacon Stubbs, a physician and surgeon who graduated from Howard University College of Medicine. His mother was related to Daniel Hale Williams, an innovator of open-heart surgery and the founder of Provident Hospital in Chicago, Illinois.

Stubbs graduated as the class valedictorian from Howard High School in Wilmington in 1922. He attended the Cushing Academy from 1922 to 1923. In 1923, he started Dartmouth College, graduating with a Bachelors of Arts magna cum laude in 1927. At Dartmouth, he was a member of Phi Beta Kappa. He was also received a Rufus Choate scholarship, allowing him to spend a summer studying at the Marine Biological Laboratory at Woods Hole, Massachusetts.

Next, Stubbs attended Harvard Medical School, graduating with his Doctor of Medicine cum laude in 1931. He was the fourth Black to graduate from Harvard Medical and was the first African American to be elected to Alpha Omega Alpha at Harvard.

He started his surgical residency in July 1931 at the Cleveland City Hospital; he was the first Black intern to work there. His two years in Cleveland included the study of thoracic surgery. He then completed a surgical residency at Frederick Douglass Memorial Hospital and Training School from 1933 to 1934. After the death of a patient under his care, Stubbs extended his medical training. He studied thoracic surgery for a year at Seavew Hospital in Staten Island, New York, specializing in the diagnosis and treatment of pulmonary tuberculosis. After completing his studies, Stubbs became the first Black thoracic surgeon.

== Career ==
Stubbs became the chief of thoracic surgery at the Frederick Douglass Memorial Hospital in 1938. He was briefly supernatant of the hospital. He was also chief of surgery at Mercy Hospital. In 1936, Philadelphia Mayor Samuel Davis Wilson appointed Stubbs to the position of assistant surgeon at Philadelphia General Hospital, Stubbs was the first Black member of the hospital's staff. Later, he was acting chief surgeon of the division of tuberculosis of Philadelphia General Hospital.

Stubbs was also an associate in surgery at Jefferson Hospital and a courtesy staff member of Hahnemann Hospital. Stubbs was also the director of the Philadelphia Health Center, part of the city's Department of Health. He used his expertise to help African Americans and people in the low-income areas of Philadelphia. In 1938, he joined a national drive of the National Medical Association to address health concerns of African Americans, leading the program on tuberculosis. He was also the surgeon for the Home of the Aged and Infirm Colored Persons.

Stubbs received national acclaim for his advancements in thoracic surgery and the surgical treatment of pulmonary tuberculosis. Time (magazine) featured his groundbreaking use of thoracoplasty at Douglass Hospital in April 1940. He was the first African American to perform a lobectomy and a pneumonectomy. He was considered "one of the country’s greatest young surgeons".

== Professional affiliations ==
Stubbs was the vice president of the National Medical Association and secretary of the surgical section and its commission on tuberculosis. He was also a contributing editor for the Journal of the National Medical Association. He was president of the Pennsylvania Medical, Dental, and Pharmaceutical Association.

Stuffs was a diplomat of the American Board of Surgery and a fellow of the American College of Chest Surgeons, the American College of Surgeons, and the International College of Surgeons. He belonged to the American Medical Association, the American Public Health Association, and the National Tuberculosis Society. He also belonged to the Laennic Society of Philadelphia, the Pennsylvania Tuberculosis Society, the Philadelphia Association of Tuberculosis Clinis, the Philadelphia County Medical Society, and the State Medical Society of Pennsylvania.

== Honors ==
The Surgical Section of the National Medical Association named its annual lecture in surgery The Frederick Douglass Stubbs Surgical Lecture.

The Frederick Douglass Stubbs Elementary School in Wilmington, Delaware, was named in his honor in 1953.

== Personal life ==
Stubbs married Marion Virginia Turner, a Philadelphia socialite and concert pianist who was the daughter of the surgeon John P. Turner, on June 7, 1934. The couple had two daughters, Marion Patricia Stubbs and Frederica Turner Stubbs. Their winter home was at 1920 N. 12th Street in Philadelphia and they had a summer home at West Valley Road in Strafford, Pennsylvania.

Stubbs served on the boards of the Cheney Training School for Teachers, the Community Chest, and the Family Society. He was a member of Sigma Pi Phi.

While traveling by train from New York City to Long Island City with his wife, Stubbs died from a heart attack on February 9, 1947, at the age of 41. He was pronounced dead at St. John's Hospital in Long Island.

== Selected publications ==
- "Phrenic, Exeresis in Treatment of Pulmonary Tuberculosis". Pennsylvania Medical Journal, vol. 39, p. 776, 1936.
- "Surgical Treatment of Pulmonary Tuberculosis in The Small General Hospital" Provident Hospital Bulletin, vol. 2, p. 1, 1939.
- "Acute Silicosis". Archives of Pathology, vol. 24, p. 274, 1939.
- "Closed Intrapleural Pneumonolysis with Report of 40 Cases". National Medical Association, vol. 31, p. 93, 1939.
- "The Fundamental Physiologic Concepts Underlying Major Surgery of the Chest". Journal of the National Medical Association, vol. 35, p. 1, 1943. (Third Annual Oration in Surgery, N. M. A.)
- "Closed Intrapleural Pneumonolysis: A Resume". Clinics, vol. 3, p. 1123, 1945. (Abstract in Year Book of Surgery, 1945)
- "Present Trends in The Surgical Treatment of Pulmonary Tuberculosis" Bulletin of the National Tuberculosis Association, June 1945. (Trudeau Society Article)
