= Marion Turner Stubbs =

African American organization leader (1910–1994)

- Born: Marion Virginia Turner; January 18, 1910; Philadelphia, Pennsylvania, US
- Died: March 25, 1994 (aged 84); Columbia, Maryland, US
- Burial place: Eden Cemetery (Collingdale, Pennsylvania)
- Other name: Marion Stubbs Thomas
- Education: University of Pennsylvania Juilliard School; Sorbonne University Zeckwer-Hahn Philadelphia Musical Academy
- Occupations: Concert pianist, music teacher, and counselor for the United States Department of Housing and Urban Development
- Known for: Founder of Jack and Jill of America

Marion Turner Stubbs (January 18, 1910 – March 25, 1994) was an African American concert pianist and clubwoman. She established Jack and Jill of America in 1938 and was also active in The Gay Northeasterners (now Northeasterner, Inc.).

== Early life ==
Marion Virginia Turner was born in Philadelphia, Pennsylvania on January 18, 1910. Her parents were Marion C. and John Patrick Turner, a surgeon and the first Black member of the Philadelphia Board of Education. Turner had an upper class childhood and was a socialite.

She attended the University of Pennsylvania, graduating in 1930. While there she was a member of Delta Sigma Theta sorority.

She then attended Juilliard School and spent a year at Sorbonne University in Paris. She planned on studying with Igor Stravinsky but instead married. She then attended the Zeckwer-Hahn Philadelphia Musical Academy, receiving a music degree. She was the first African American to graduate from the academy.

== Career ==
Stubbs was a concert pianist during the 1930s. At her debut recital on April 22, 1931, The Philadelphia Inquirer wrote that she "played an exacting and diversified programme with much technical skill and excellent tone". She also taught piano in Bordentown, New Jersey.

In the 1970s, she worked as an equal employment opportunity counselor for the Fair Housing Commission of the United States Department of Housing and Urban Development.

== Clubwoman ==
On June 28, 1930, Stubbs was a founding member of the Philadelphia chapter of The Gay Northeasterners (now Northeasterners, Inc.), a social club for African American women. She was its national president from 1956 to 1958.

Stubbs founded Jack and Jill of America in Philadelphia on January 24, 1938. She said, "We were all friends, and it seemed a good idea to bring together our children to play on a regular basis". When she married and moved to Detroit, she founded a Jack and Jill chapter there. Jack and Jill grew into an important youth-focused civic organization that includes 252 chapters in the United States and Germany, as of 2023.

== Personal life ==
Marion Turner married Frederick Douglass Stubbs, a thoracic surgeon, on June 7, 1934. Dr. Stubbs was one of the first African Americans to graduate from the Harvard Medical School and became the head of the surgery department at the Frederick Douglass Memorial Hospital and Training School and chief chest surgeon at the Philadelphia General Hospital. They had two daughters, Marion Patricia Stubbs and Frederica Turner Stubbs. He died in 1947 at the age of 39.

She married Alfred "Alf" E. Thomas Jr., a doctor from Detroit, Michigan in 1947. Dr. Thomas founded the Haynes Memorial Hospital and inherited the Bethesda Hospital and the Edyth K. Thomas Hospital from his father. The couple were leaders in Detroit's social scene during the 1950s and 1960s. They had one daughter, Linda Thomas. Dr. Thomas died in 1968; at the time he was one of the wealthiest African Americans in the United States.

After Alf died, she moved back to the east coast. Marion Turner Stubbs Thomas died in Columbia, Maryland on March 25, 1994, after a stroke. She was buried in Eden Cemetery in Collingdale, Pennsylvania. All three of her daughters were members of Jack and Jill.

== See also ==
- American Black Upper Class
