= Hahnemann Hospital =

Hahnemann Hospital could mean:

- Liverpool Homeopathic Hospital, Liverpool, UK; known from 1969 as the Hahnemann Hospital
- Hahnemann Hospital (Worcester), Worcester, Massachusetts, US
- Hahnemann University Hospital, teaching hospital in Philadelphia, Pennsylvania, US (closed in 2019)
- National Homeopathic Hospital, Washington, D.C., US; from 1956, known as Hahnemann Hospital and located at 135 New York Ave., N.W., Washington, D.C.
