= Mary Washington =

Mary Washington may refer to:

- Mary L. Washington (born 1962), Maryland legislator
- Mary Ball Washington (1708–1789), mother of U.S. President George Washington
  - University of Mary Washington, Fredericksburg, Virginia, named after Mary Ball Washington
- Mary Helen Washington (born 1941), American literary scholar
- Mary T. Washington (1906–2005), first African-American woman to be a certified public accountant in the United States
- Mary Burke Washington (1926–2014), American economist
- Mary Parks Washington (1924–2019), American artist, arts advocate, and art educator
