= Edward Ellis =

Edward Ellis may refer to:

== Sports ==
- Edward Ellis (cricketer, born 1810) (1810–1887), English cricketer
- Edward Ellis (cricketer, born 1995), English cricketer
- Ed Ellis (born 1975), American football player
- Ted Ellis (footballer) (1913–2007), Australian rules footballer

== Others ==
- Edward Ellis, author of Ruth the Betrayer, the first story of a female detective, published in London in 1862
- Edward Ellis (actor) (1870–1952), American actor
- Edward Ellis (bishop) (1899–1979), Roman Catholic bishop of Nottingham
- Edward Ellis (Royal Navy officer) (1918–2002), president of the Royal Naval College, Greenwich
- Edward D. Ellis (1801–1848), American newspaper publisher and politician in Michigan
- Edward Robb Ellis (1911–1998), American diarist and journalist
- Edward S. Ellis (1840–1916), American author
- Edward F. W. Ellis (1819–1862), politician, lawyer and American Civil War officer
- Ted Ellis (artist) (born 1963), American artist
- Ted Ellis (naturalist) (1909–1986), Norfolk naturalist and journalist

== See also ==
- Edward Ellice (disambiguation)
- Theodore Ellis (disambiguation)
