= Edwin C. J. T. Howard =

African-American doctor (1846–1912)

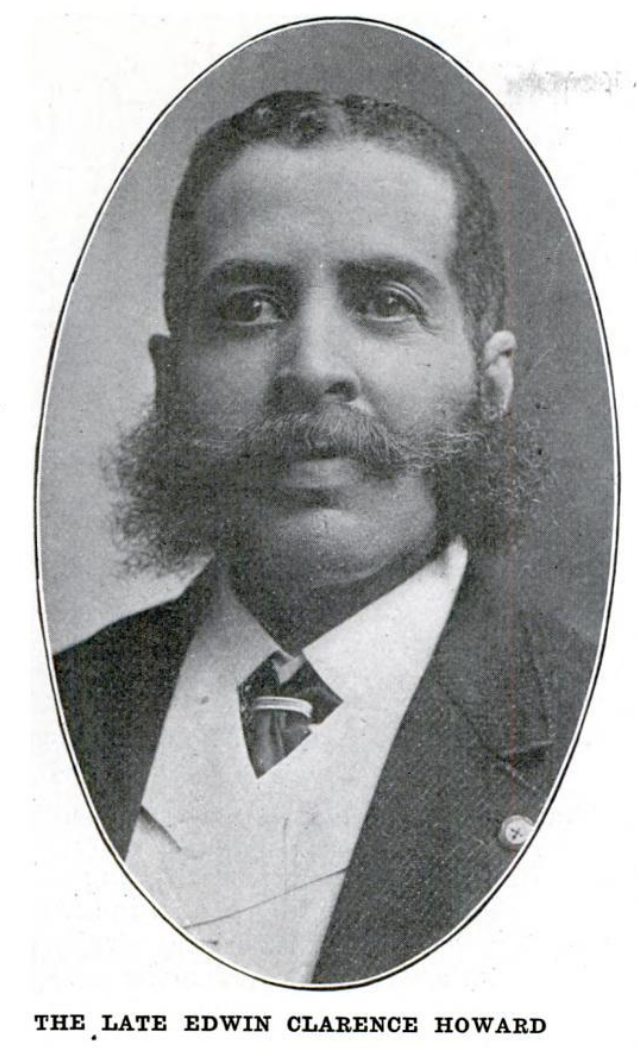
- Born: Edwin Clarence Joseph Turpin Howard; October 21, 1846; Boston, Massachusetts, U.S.
- Died: May 10, 1912 (aged 65); Philadelphia, Pennsylvania
- Resting place: Eden Cemetery, Collingdale, Pennsylvania; 39.92030, -75.27399
- Education: Harvard Medical School; Liberia College
- Years active: 1869-1912
- Known for: One of the first black graduates of Harvard Medical School (1869)
- Relatives: Joan Imogen Howard (sister); Dr. John Van Surley DeGrasse (uncle); Ednorah Nahar (cousin)
- Scientific career
- Fields: Medicine: Gynecology and Otorhinolaryngology
- Workplaces: Frederick Douglass Memorial Hospital and Training School

Edwin C. J. T. Howard (Edwin Clarence Joseph Turpin Howard (October 21, 1846 – May 10, 1912) was an American physician and one of the first black graduates of Harvard Medical School in 1869. After graduating from Harvard, Dr. Howard worked in Charleston, South Carolina, and Philadelphia, Pennsylvania, where he played a role in establishing the first two hospitals for black patients, Frederick Douglass Memorial Hospital and Training School and Mercy Hospital. He was also a co-founder of Sigma Pi Phi, one of the oldest graduate-level Greek fraternities in America.

== Early life and education ==
Edwin C.J.T. Howard was born in Boston on October 21, 1846. His father, Edwin Frederick Howard, was from Boston, and his mother, Joan Louise Turpin Howard, was from New York City. He had two sisters: Adeline Turpin Howard (1844-1922) and Joan Imogen Howard (1848-1937), who was the first black graduate of Girls' High School in Boston. He was a member of a prominent 19th-century African American family that included two noted doctors. His aunt and uncle were Cordelia L. Howard DeGrasse and Dr. John Van Surley DeGrasse, and he was related to Edward V. Asbury, MD, a Boston doctor in the 1850s. Ednorah Nahar and Georgenia Cordelia DeGrasse were two of his cousins.

He attended Boston Latin School. From 1861 to 1865, he studied at Liberia College in Monrovia, Liberia under Dr. Charles B. Dunbar. While in Liberia, he kept encrypted diaries of his activities. He did not receive a degree from Liberia College.

In 1865, he returned to the United States and studied at Boston City Hospital. He was a Harvard Medical School student in the summer of 1866, and during the 1866-1867 winter session. In 1869, he graduated from Harvard Medical School. His thesis was on puerperal fever, a reference to bacterial infections that women may get following childbirth or miscarriage. He and Thomas Graham Dorsey were the first African American physicians to graduate from Harvard Medical School.

As part of his medical education, he spent time as an observer and student at hospitals and institutions in England and France.

== Career ==
After graduating from Harvard, Howard first practiced medicine in Charleston, South Carolina. He later moved to Philadelphia, Pennsylvania. He was a throat specialist. In 1870, he treated patients in Philadelphia during the global smallpox epidemic. Records indicate that he had a “zero patient mortality rate” during the epidemic.

In 1895, he was part of the “Founding Fathers” of the Frederick Douglass Memorial Hospital and Training School, the first hospital for black patients and doctors in Philadelphia. He was part of the first staff of physicians and the first chairman. He was also a lecturer and chairman of the Nurses' Training School that was part of the hospital.

Between 1905 and 1907, he worked with a group of fellow physicians to establish Mercy Hospital, the second black-managed medical institution in Philadelphia. In 1948, Douglass and Mercy merged to become the Mercy-Douglass Hospital. The hospital closed in 1973.

He was one of eight black men commissioned into the United Medical Corps and served with the 12th Infantry Regiment in Pennsylvania, rising to the ranks of major and surgeon general.

== Community ==
In 1888, Howard was elected a member of the Philadelphia Board of Education (Public School Board of the Seventh Ward) for eleven years.

In 1904, he was of the first four members of Sigma Pi Phi, the first and oldest black Greek fraternity in the United States. Sigma Pi Phi, also known as “The Boule”, is a graduate-level and professional fraternity and does not have college chapters.

He was a president and member of the Citizens Republican Club.

He was a multiple level Mason, and the first Master of Alban Lodge No. 57 (now St. Alban Lodge No.35), Prince Hall Masons.

He was a member of the Philadelphia County Medical Society, the Pennsylvania State Medical Society, and the American Medical Association.

== Personal ==
Howard never married. He was a Vestryman and later Warden of the African Episcopal Church of St. Thomas in Philadelphia.

Howard died of diabetes on May 10, 1912, in his home in Philadelphia. He is buried with his sisters in Eden Cemetery in Collingdale, Pennsylvania.

== Legacy ==
- Harvard Medical School hosts annually the Howard, Dorsey, Still Lecture and Diversity Awards in recognition of the school's first three black graduates.
- Howard’s diaries are part of the DeGrasse-Howard papers collection at the Massachusetts Historical Society.
