= Theodore Ellis =

Theodore Ellis or Ted Ellis may refer to:

- Ted Ellis (artist) (born 1963), American artist
- Ted Ellis (footballer) (1913–2007), Australian rules footballer
- Ted Ellis (naturalist) (1909–1986), Norfolk naturalist and journalist
- Theodore T. Ellis (1867–1934), American inventor and publisher.

== See also ==
- Edward Ellis (disambiguation)
