= Edward Ellice =

Edward Ellice may refer to:

- Edward Ellice (merchant) (1783–1863), merchant and politician, and a prime mover behind the Reform Bill of 1832
  - Edward Ellice (1813 ship), launched in New Brunswick
- Edward Ellice (MP for St Andrews) (1810–80), son of the above, Whig politician
- Edward Charles Ellice (1858–1934), cousin of the second, Liberal MP for St Andrews Burghs

== See also ==
- Edward Ellis (disambiguation)
