= Emily Brown Portwig =

American pharmacist and clubwoman

- Born: Emily Brown; September 9, 1896; Georgia
- Died: February 4, 1960 (aged 63); Camp Pendleton
- Other name: Emily Brown Childress
- Occupations: Pharmacist, clubwoman

Emily Brown Childress Portwig (September 9, 1896 – February 4, 1960) was an American pharmacist and clubwoman based in Los Angeles, California.

== Early life ==
Emily Brown was born in Georgia and raised in Los Angeles, the daughter of William B. Brown III and Harriet Gourdine Brown. She graduated from Los Angeles High School. She attended the University of California, Los Angeles (UCLA), and Howard University, before pursuing graduate studies in bacteriology at the University of Southern California.

== Career ==
Portwig was a pharmacist. In 1924, Portwig founded the Rho Psi Phi medical sorority's second chapter, in Los Angeles. She was active in the National Medical Auxiliary, and the National Medical, Dental, and Pharmaceutical Association. At UCLA, she participated in Pilgrim House, and in the Intercultural Group of the campus's religious conference. She was a committee chair for a YWCA-USO unit in Los Angeles. In 1959, she served on the Los Angeles County grand jury.

Portwig was active in the Val Verde community, "among the pioneers who worked hard for the development of Val Verde as a vacation paradise", recalled one neighbor there. She worked with young women at Los Angeles High School, and took groups of girls camping at her mountain cabin in Val Verde. She spoke at the dedication of the swimming pool in Val Verde in 1939. In 1957, she was won the Old Charter Distillery Company's annual award for contributions to the Val Verde community.

Portwig, not herself a mother but an involved aunt, took interest in supports for mothers and children in the African-American community in Los Angeles. She was active in the YWCA and the Girl Scouts. She founded the first West Coast chapter of Jack and Jill of America, an organization for African-American mothers, in Los Angeles in 1948. In 1950, she co-founded the Lullaby Guild, a women's organization under the Children's Home Society, working to find foster homes for African-American children in need.

== Personal life and legacy ==
Emily Brown married real estate agent and Navy veteran James Rufus Portwig. Their home in Los Angeles was known as "The Anchor" and they hosted many social gatherings there. In 1934, Emily Brown Portwig "motored east" from California to New York with her friend Hattie White Tarleton, to meet Portwig's husband when he was on leave from the Navy. She died in 1960, aged 63 years, at Camp Pendleton in California. Her grave is in Angelus-Rosedale Cemetery.

The Jack and Jill chapter founded by Portwig in Los Angeles marked its 70th anniversary in 2019.
