= Mary Barksdale =

African-American nurse and businesswoman

- Born: November 24, 1920; Georgia, U.S.
- Died: October 9, 1992 (aged 71); Springfield, Massachusetts, U.S.
- Education: Spelman College

Mary Zoner Hurston Barksdale Lawes (November 24, 1920 - October 9, 1992 ) was a prominent African-American nurse and businesswoman. She was the owner and administrator, for twenty-seven years, of the Hurstdale Rest Home, the only black-owned rest home in western Massachusetts.

== Life and career ==
Lawes was born in 1920 to John Paul Hurston and Lula Mae Taylor, in Atlanta, Georgia. She attended Spelman College and migrated to the Springfield area in the 1940s.

In 1952, she graduated from a Springfield area nursing school and became a licensed L.P.N. She was one of the first Black nurses to work for the Holyoke visiting nurses program and later Springfield Hospital.

== Community service ==
Barksdale was a past President of Jack and Jill of America, a national black mothers' organization. She was on the Board of Directors for both the Action for Equality and Achiever's Opportunity Corporations. She also received a certificate of excellence from Harvard University for her work in gerontology. She, along with her late husband, Abraham Barksdale, was instrumental in the founding of the D. Edward Wells Federal Credit Union.

== Civil rights ==
Her husband's Abraham Barksdale's crowning achievement was the desegregation of Springfield Public Schools. In Barksdale v. Springfield School Committee, a de facto segregation lawsuit, Abraham Barksdale and Mary Barksdale challenged the concept of racial isolation because the school a child attended was based on the neighborhood in which you lived. Barksdale won and Springfield Public Schools were desegregated in 1965.
