= Nina Foxx =

American dramatist

Nina Foxx is an American author, playwright and filmmaker. She has authored several novels, co-authored one text on writing, and her work has been anthologized multiple times. She has also penned two stage plays that include original music with collaborator John Forbes. Foxx writes under several names including: Nina Foxx and Cynnamon Foster. Foxx has lived in Austin, Texas.

== Biography ==
Foxx is originally from Queens, New York. She graduated from Hunter College (BA Psychology), Baruch College (MS, I/O, Psychology), City University of New York (Ph.D. I/O Psychology) and holds an MFA in Creative Writing (fiction) from Fairleigh Dickinson University.

Prior to becoming a writer, Foxx worked for Dell. She authored several industrial design patents and has taught Applied Psychology at several universities. Foxx speaks about the writing life and blending the arts and technology to groups and schools all over the United States as part of various STEM efforts with groups such as The Links, Inc and code.org. In 2019, Foxx, along with her husband, founded The Writing Sisters Summit writer's retreat. Foxx is a member of Alpha Kappa Alpha sorority, The Links, Inc., The Girl Friends, Inc, and Jack and Jill of America.

== Work ==
Foxx co-directed Marrying Up, which was based on her book of the same name. In addition to this film work, Foxx is Executive Producer of the feature film Magic Valley', which was an official selection of the 2011 TriBeCa Film Festival.

Foxx was nominated for an award in Outstanding Literary Work in Fiction by the NAACP Image Awards in 2014.

== Books ==
=== As Cynnamon Foster ===
- Eastern Spice (2011)
- Southern Comfort (2010)
- Northern Passion (2014)

=== As Nina Foxx ===
- Bloom Within
- Unapologetic
- Island Secrets
- And You'd Better Not Tell
- Momma: Gone A Personal Story
- Catfish
- A Letter for my Mother
- Do Right Woman (2011). A serial novel
- No Girl Needs a Husband Seven days A Week
- Just Short of Crazy
- Marrying Up
- Going Buck Wild
- Get Some Love
- Dippin' My Spoon
- Do The Write Thing: Seven Steps to Publishing Success (contributor)

=== Anthologies ===
- A Letter for My Mother (Editor)
- Wanderlust: Erotic Travel Tales (edited by Carol Taylor)
- Can't Help The Way That I Feel (edited by Lori Bryant Woolridge)
