= Thasunda Duckett =

American businesswoman (born 1973)

Thasunda Brown Duckett (born July 22, 1973) is an American businesswoman who is the president and chief executive officer (CEO) of TIAA. She is a former CEO of Chase Consumer Banking, a division of JPMorgan Chase, and a member of the board of directors of Nike. Duckett is also a member of The Business Council's executive committee.

== Early life and education ==
Duckett was born in Rochester, New York. She later moved to Texas with her parents, where she graduated from Sam Houston High School. She attended the University of Houston, receiving a Bachelor's degree in Finance and Marketing. She enrolled at Baylor University, where she earned an MBA.

== Career ==
Early in her career, Duckett was a Director of Emerging Markets at Fannie Mae, where she led the implementation of national strategies designed to increase homeownership among Black and Hispanic Americans.

In May 2021, Duckett became the CEO of the Teachers Insurance and Annuity Association of America (TIAA), making her the fourth black woman Fortune 500 CEO, and one of two female black Americans to then lead a Fortune 500 company.

Duckett joined JPMorgan Chase in 2004 after working at Fannie Mae. She was CEO of Chase Auto Finance from 2013 to 2016 and CEO of Chase Consumer Banking from 2016 until she joined TIAA in May 2021. At Chase Consumer Banking, she oversaw a business with more than $600 billion in deposits and 50,000 employees.

In 2023, she ranked 34th in Forbes list of "World's 100 most powerful women". She was ranked 16th on Fortune's list of Most Powerful Women in 2023. In 2024, American Banker honored Thasunda as one of The Most Powerful Women in Banking.

In 2025, Duckett appeared in the Forbes' 50 Over 50: Investment list.

== Board memberships ==
In addition to Nike, Duckett is on the boards of Robert F. Kennedy Human Rights, Sesame Workshop, National Medal of Honor Museum, Economic Club of New York, University of Houston Board of Visitors and Dean’s Advisory Board for the Baylor University's Hankamer School of Business. She is a member of the Executive Leadership Council, Delta Sigma Theta sorority and Jack and Jill of America.

== Personal life ==
Duckett is married with four children. She founded and chairs The Otis and Rosie Brown Foundation to continue the legacy of her parents.
