= Pauline Weeden Maloney =

American educator (1904–1987)

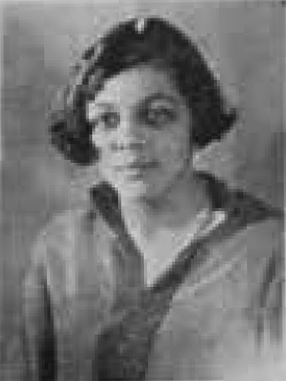
- Margaret Pauline Fletcher, from the 1926 yearbook of Howard University
- Born: Margaret Pauline Fletcher; November 11, 1904; Annapolis, Maryland, US
- Died: June 22, 1987 (aged 82); Lynchburg, Virginia, US
- Occupations: Educator, college administrator, clubwoman

Pauline Weeden Maloney (November 11, 1904 – June 22, 1987), born Margaret Pauline Fletcher, was an American educator based in Lynchburg, Virginia. She was the third national president of The Links, and rector of Norfolk State University.

== Early life and education ==
Margaret Pauline "Polly" Fletcher was born in Annapolis, Maryland, the daughter of William Fletcher and Eliza Fletcher. She attended Morgan Academy in Baltimore, and she graduated from Howard University in 1926. At Howard, she was a member of Delta Sigma Theta. She later earned a master's degree from Columbia University.

== Career ==
Maloney taught and served as a guidance counselor and an assistant principal in the Lynchburg Public Schools, especially at Paul Laurence Dunbar High School, from 1937 to 1970. She was the first Black president of the Virginia School Boards Association and the Southern Region of the National School Boards Association.

From 1957 to 1962, the third national president of The Links; she founded Lynchburg's chapter of The Links in 1950. As Links president, she spoke at the annual awards ceremony of the Virginia Teachers Association in 1960. Also in 1960, she addressed a public hearing of the Federal Communications Commission, on the subject of Black representation in television and radio production and programming: "The influence that broadcasting has on education, science, art, commerce, and the moral welfare of our country concerns all of us, and obviously lies at the root of these public hearings," she declared.

She was also a regional director of Delta Sigma Theta, and one of the founding officers of the Friends of the Lynchburg Public Library, when it started in 1966. Maloney retired from schoolwork in 1977 and became the first woman rector of Norfolk State University. She was also active in Jack and Jill of America, the NAACP, and church organizations.

== Personal life ==
Polly Fletcher married dentist Henry P. Weeden in North Carolina, and moved with him to Lynchburg in 1950. He died in 1964. Her second husband was Clarence Maloney, an attorney. Polly Weeden Maloney died in 1987, in Lynchburg, aged 82 years, survived by three daughters. In 2015, a historical marker about her was placed near her former home in Lynchburg, describing her career and noting her status as Lynchburg's "First Lady of Education." September 26, 2015, was declared "Pauline Weeden Maloney Day" by Lynchburg's mayor. She is one of the educators depicted in a three-panel mural by Ann van de Graaf, titled "Lord Plant My Feet on Higher Ground". In 2018 the Virginia Capitol Foundation announced that Maloney's name would be on the Virginia Women's Monument's glass Wall of Honor.
