= Thomas Graham Dorsey =

African-American physician (1839–1897)

Thomas Dorsey
- Born: Thomas Graham Dorsey; February 1839
- Died: November 22, 1897 (aged 58); Washington, D.C.
- Education: Oberlin College; Harvard Medical School
- Years active: 1869–1897
- Known for: One of the first black graduates of Harvard Medical School (1869)
- Scientific career
- Fields: Medicine

Thomas Graham Dorsey (February 1839 – November 22, 1897) was an American physician, and one of the first black graduates of Harvard Medical School in 1869.

== Biography ==
Thomas Graham Dorsey was born in February 1839, in Philadelphia, Pennsylvania. He was the youngest son of Mary E. Dorsey and Augustus Dorsey, a clothier and real estate investor. His oldest brother, Charles A. Dorsey, was an educator and the namesake of Charles A. Dorsey School PS 67 in Brooklyn, New York.

He graduated from Oberlin Academy in 1860, and attended Oberlin College until 1862. Beginning in 1865, he apprenticed with J. M. Leedom, M.D., in Germantown and Philadelphia. Leedom arranged for him to continue his medical education at Harvard Medical School. In 1869, Dorsey graduated from Harvard Medical School. Edwin C. J. T. Howard and he were the first black doctors to graduate from Harvard Medical School.

After Harvard, Dorsey was a doctor in Washington, D.C.

Dorsey died on November 22, 1897, in Washington, D.C. Upon his father's death, his brother and he inherited a portion of "the most valuable real estate owned by Afro-Americans in Philadelphia."

== Legacy ==
Harvard Medical School hosts the annual "Howard, Dorsey, Still Lecture and Diversity Awards Ceremony" to honor the school's first three black graduates.
