= Joan Imogen Howard =

American educator (1848–1937)

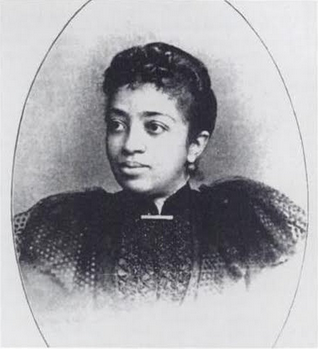
Joan Imogen Howard

Joan Imogen Howard (7 November 1848, Boston – 8 November 1937, Philadelphia) was an American educator and principal from the U.S. state of Massachusetts. Characterized as a "black liberal integrationist", she was the first African American graduate of Girls High and Normal School in Boston, as well as the only African American to serve on a state board for the Columbian Exposition.

== Early years and education ==
Joan Imogen Howard, was born in Boston in 1848, though both 1850 and 1851 have also been mentioned. Her father, Edwin Frederick Howard, was a well-known citizen of that city, and her mother, Joan Louise Turpin Howard, was a native of New York. She had one sister, Adeline Turpin Howard, the principal of the Wormley School, Washington, D. C., and one brother, Edwin C. J. T. Howard, M. D., the first African American graduate of Harvard Medical School, and a prominent physician in Philadelphia. She was a cousin of the well-known elocutionist, Ednorah Nahar.

She graduated from the Wells Grammar School, Blossom Street, Boston, as one of ten honor pupils who received silver medals. Her parents encouraged her to pursue a higher course of instruction, and consequently, after a successful entrance examination, she became a student of the Girls' High and Normal School, as it was then called. She was the first African American women to enter, and after a three years' course, to graduate from this, which was, at that time, the highest institution of learning in Boston.

== Career ==
A situation as an assistant teacher in Colored Grammar School No. 4, later Grammar School No. 81, was immediately offered. For several years an evening school, which was largely attended and of which she was principal, was carried on in the same building. Later, she took a course in “Methods of Instruction” at the Saturday sessions of the Normal College of New York City, receiving a Master of Arts diploma from this institution (1877). In 1892, she received the degree of Master of Pedagogy at the University of the City of New York. She held a special position on the Board of Women Managers of the State of New York for the Columbian Exposition, one of five of the Committee on Education.

She was first Superintendent and a member of the board of directors of Mercy Hospital in Philadelphia. In addition, she presided over the J. Imogen Howard Club of Mercy Hospital.
