= Jack and Jill of America =

African American women and children club

- Formation: January 1938; 88 years ago
- Founder: Marion Turner Stubbs
- Founded at: Philadelphia, Pennsylvania, US
- Type: Non-profit corporation
- Headquarters: 1930 17th Street NW; Washington, D.C.
- Members: 40,000+
- Website: jackandjillinc.org

Jack and Jill of America is an American leadership organization for African American mothers and their children. It was established in Philadelphia in 1938. The organization aims to improve the quality of life of children, particularly African American children.

As of 2022, there are over 230 Jack and Jill chapters in 35 states in the United States, with over 10,000 mother members and 40,000 parents and children. It is headquartered at 1930 17th Street NW in Washington, D.C.

== History ==
In January 1938, Marion Turner Stubbs organized a group of 12 mothers in Philadelphia, to establish a social and cultural union for their children, who were excluded from many activities due to segregation. The group was named Jack and Jill and grew into a leadership organization for mothers and their children. The organization aims to improve the quality of life of children, particularly African-American children. Its original membership included a number of Black Catholics, one of the largest religious groups in Philadelphia.

The second chapter of Jack and Jill was established in New York City in 1939. Its third chapter was formed in Washington, D.C. in 1940. The local group became an inter-city association, expanding to Pittsburgh; Baltimore; Boston; Buffalo; Columbus, Ohio; Durham, North Carolina; and Memphis, Tennessee between 1944 and 1946. On June 1, 1946, eight of its ten chapters met and voted to become a national organization. It was incorporated in the State of New York on August 28, 1947.

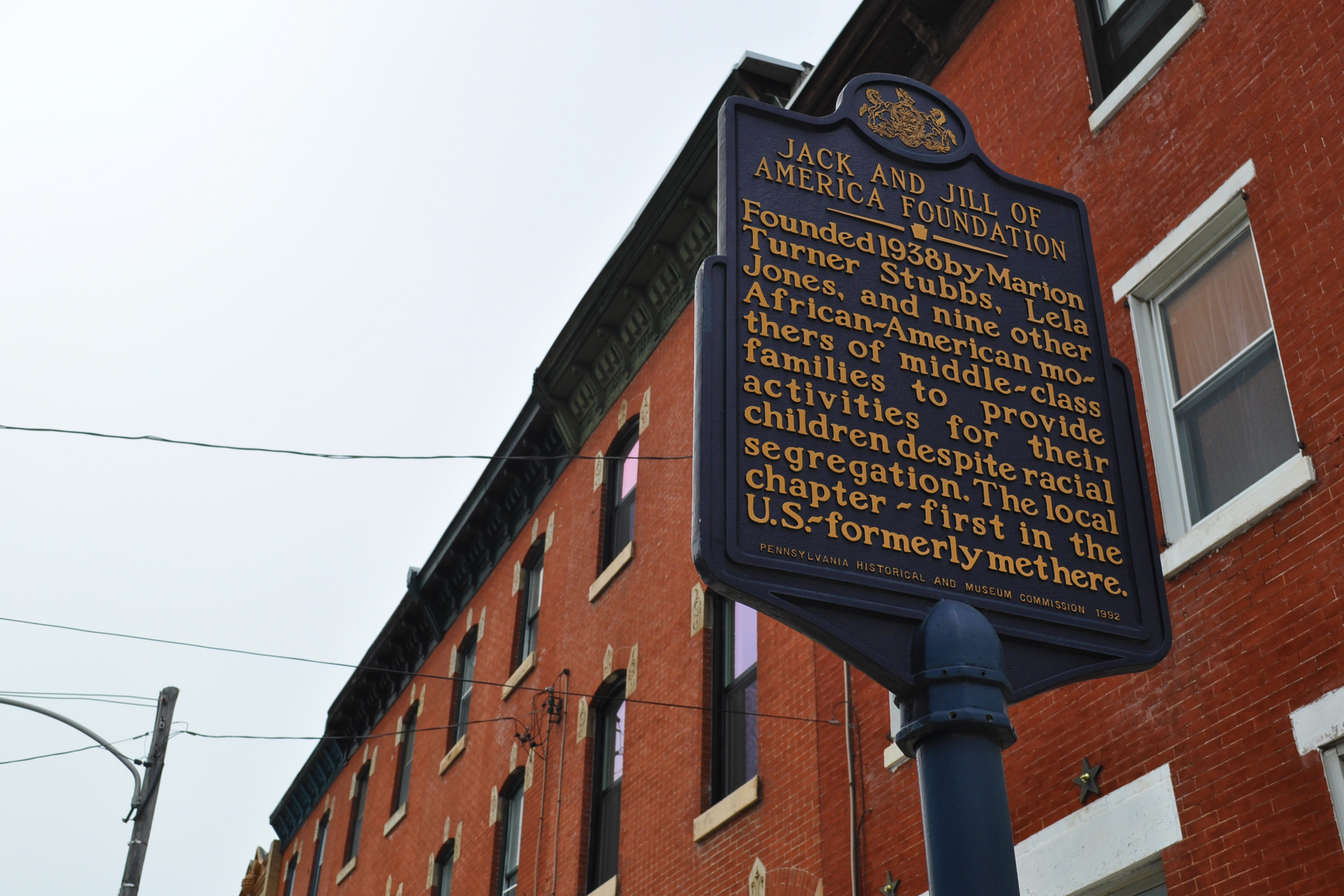
Jack and Jill of America Foundation Historical Marker at 1605 Christian St Philadelphia PA

In its early years, Jack and Jill was a prestigious club that helped African American children "fit into white America". The first Jack and Jill Teen Conference was held in Philadelphia on June 16, 1951.

During the 1960s, its membership declined. In the mid-1970s through the late 1980s, Jack and Jill had a resurgence as middle-class Black people moved into the suburbs. Its mission shifted from the assimilation into white culture to instilling ethnic pride into Black children. Chapters began to offer Afrocentric programs, including an African rite of passage for teenagers going to college. The club also hosted Kwanzaa celebrations. In May 1987, it held its first annual National Black Family Day to celebrate African American culture, promote the adoption of Black children, and talk about the needs of children in Africa.

== Symbols ==
The society was named for the nursery rhyme Jack and Jill. Jack and Jill's badge consists of interlocking letter J's. It was designed by Alberta B. Turner, the 4th National President, in 1954. Its motto is "Let's Work, Let's Play, Let's Live Together". Its publication, Up the Hill, was first issued in May 1948 and is a yearbook of the organization's members.

== Membership ==
Membership in Jack and Jill is by invitation and is selective. Each chapter has limited membership of around 45, with new members only being admitted when a current member's child graduates from high school. Historically, its members were well-educated professional women, such as academics, doctors, and lawyers, or were the wives of CEOs, doctors, funeral directors, lawyers, ministers, professors, or teachers. In 1978, The Washington Times noted that the true sign of making it in Washington, D.C.'s Black society was being chosen for membership in Jack and Jill.

Children can be members until they graduate from high school but can rejoin after they marry and have their own family.

== Philanthropy ==
In 1968, the organization created its philanthropic arm, the Jack and Jill of America Foundation, incorporated in the State of Illinois. The foundation has been responsible for the origin and funding of many educational and charitable projects benefiting children and families in communities across the United States. It has contributed millions of dollars to Black-focused organizations and projects, including: Africare, the American Red Cross, the United Negro College Fund, the King Center for Nonviolent Social Change, the March of Dimes, and the NAACP Legal Defense and Educational Fund.

== Criticism ==
Jack and Jill has been criticized by many African Americans as "a bunch of elitist and bourgeois families." The Washington Post notes that Jack and Jill's "critics have described it as a 'snobbish club for black elites.'" However, its members considered their organization to be "selective" rather than snobbish.

== Notable members ==
- Sadie T. M. Alexander (1898–1989), lawyer, civil rights activist, and economist
- Mary Barksdale (1920–1992), nurse and businesswoman
- Julian Bond (1940–2015), politician and activist
- Ron Brown (1941–1996), politician
- Helen Octavia Dickens (1909–2001), physician
- Suzzanne Douglas (1957–2021), actress
- Thasunda Duckett (born 1973) businesswoman
- Ron Dullums (1935–2018), politician
- Ted Ellis (born 1963), painter
- Nina Foxx, author, playwright, and filmmaker
- Velveta Golightly-Howell, lawyer
- Frederick D. Gregory (born 1941), astronaut
- William H. Grey III (1941–2013), politician
- Josie R. Johnson (born 1930), Civil rights activist
- Kathleen Jones-King (1905–1999), physician and clubwoman
- Carlotta Walls LaNier (born 1942), activist; one of the Little Rock Nine
- Josephine Harreld Love (1914–2003), musicologist and concert pianist
- Pauline Weeden Maloney (1904–1987), educator
- Tyler Mitchell (born 1995), photographer
- Jalina Porter, political advisor
- Emily Brown Portwig (1896–1960), pharmacist and clubwoman
- Charles Rangel (1930–2025), politician
- Phylicia Rashad (born 1948), actress
- Jackie Robinson (1919–1972), baseball player
- Gertrude Schalk (1906–1977), writer and editor
- Betty Shabazz (1934–1997), educator and civil rights activist; wife of Malcolm X
- Juliana Stratton (born 1965), politician
- Marion Turner Stubbs (1910–1994), pianist; founder of Jack and Jill
- Thyrsa Frazier Svager (1930–1999), mathematician
- Alberta Banner Turner (1909–2008), academic
- Mary Parks Washington (1914–2019), painter
- Lynn Whitfield (born 1953), actress
- Andrew Young (born 1932), politician
