= Mary Parks Washington =

African-American painter (1914–2019)

- Born: Mary Parks; July 20, 1924; Atlanta, Georgia, U.S.
- Died: March 27, 2019 (aged 94)
- Education: Spelman College; Black Mountain College; San Jose State University
- Children: 2

Mary Parks Washington (July 20, 1924 – March 27, 2019) was an American artist, arts advocate and art educator.

== Biography ==
Mary Parks Washington was born in Atlanta, Georgia to Hattie Brookins Parks and Walter A. Parks. She had three sisters. She attended Booker T. Washington High School, where she was a member of and created marionettes for the Doll Theatre Club. She graduated from Spelman College in 1945 with a degree in art, where she worked closely with Hale Woodruff. She received a master's degree in art from San Jose State University in San Jose, California. Washington later went on to start an NAACP scholarship program for SJSU students.

She was a member of Jack and Jill of America and Alpha Kappa Alpha. In the summer of 1946, she was awarded a scholarship to attend Black Mountain College. At Black Mountain, she was roommates with sculptor Ruth Asawa. She also studied at the Art Students League of New York and the Universidad Nacional de México.

Washington worked as a teacher in the San Jose Union District for 28 years.

== Art ==
She developed a kind of painting she referred to as “histcollages” which included personal photographs, newspaper clippings, various writings, drawings and paintings. By 1974, one of her paintings, "Black Soul", was held by the Johnson Publishing Company Art Collection in Chicago.

In 1974, she held a one-woman art show at the San Jose Art League.

In 1991, she donated her high school collection of marionettes to the Center for Puppetry Arts in Atlanta.

== Personal life ==
Washington moved to Campbell, California in 1956.

Washington married and had two children.
