= Ernest James Harrell =

American commanding general

Major General Ernest James Harrell
- Ernie Harrel
- Born: October 4, 1936; Selma, Alabama
- Died: March 31, 2015 (aged 78); Tucson, Arizona
- Burial place: Arlington National Cemetery
- Spouse: Paola Harrell
- Children: Ernest III Harrell (son) & Jolene Demetrius Hamm. (daughter)

Ernest James Ernie Harrell (born October 1936 in Selma, Alabama, died 31 March 2015 in Tucson, Arizona) was the Commanding General of Europe division for the U.S. Army Corps of Engineers.

== Life ==
Ernest James Harrell was the son of William and Arrilla Harrell. Harrell had two sisters and one brother. Harrell was married to Paola Harrell for 53 years and had a son, Ernest III Harrell and a daughter, Jolene (Demetrius) Hamm.

A Memorial Service was held at Omni Tucson National Resort on 2 May 2015 at 4:00 p.m. Ernest James Harrel was interred at Arlington National Cemetery with full military honours on August 18, 2015.

== Academic career ==
Harrell attended high school, in his native city Selma, Alabama, but dropped out to serve a few more years of military service, which was already mandatory for him at the time in the U.S., at Tuskegee Institute, now Tuskegee University, Alabama. At Tuskegee, Harrell states that he initially looked for the least demanding courses and declared himself an interior decorating major. But after his freshman year, and with the help and support from his fraternity brothers from Omega Psi Phi fraternity and Sigma Pi Phi (Boulé), he switched to building construction after realising there were few opportunities in his initial decision. Harrell claims he never regretted his decision.

== Travels ==
Harrell travelled all around the globe, most of the time due to military service. He served in the Vietnam War during the mid-1970s. He was later stationed in other Asian countries for another couple of years. Some of these places included: Thailand, Okinawa and South Korea. He then served in Germany (West Germany at the time) during the late 1980s before the fall of the Berlin Wall on 13 June 1990.

== Engineering & Military Career ==
After graduating in 1960 at Tuskegee Institute (University), Harrell earned a Master of Science in engineering from Arizona State University. He then consequently joined the (American Council on Education) ACE, as a ¨natural progression¨. After that he also spent some time as an instructor and then assistant professor of military science in Arizona State University in Tempe. A couple of years after he enrolled as a student at the university to earn his master's in engineering.

During his command with the Ohio River division he developed a keen and advanced (for his time) interest for the environment: "In the past, engineers would build any damn thing and it was left to lawyers and environmentalist, even to a great degree of pain to the engineering profession, to keep the balance. We are beginning to become concerned, but we need to do much better".

He later completed the National and International Security Management Program at John F. Kennedy School of Government in the early 1970s. His last assignment, as Commanding General of the Army Corps' North Pacific Division, was based in Portland, Oregon during the early 1990s. In 1998, he was hired by the City of St. Louis as the President of the Board of Public Services. Harrell oversaw the contracts for renovations to St. Louis Lambert International Airport. After completing his tenure for the Board of Public Services, he retired to Tucson.

== Achievements ==
At age 52, Harrell's division of military engineers was responsible for more than $558 million in construction work in Europe in the 1980s.

== Awards and honours ==
- The Distinguished Service Medal
- Legion of Merit
- Bronze Star Medal
- Two Meritorious Service Medals
- Three Vietnam Service Medals
