= Walter Braithwaite (engineer) =

American engineer

Walt W. Braithwaite was born in January 1945 in Kingston, Jamaica. His mother is Ivy Braithwaite, a beautician, seamstress, and embroiderer. His father is Ivanhoe Braithwaite, a laborer and salesman. He has a sister. When Braithwaite was a teenager (around 1960), he and his family moved to England. Walter Braithwaite is now married to Rita Braithwaite. Together they have three daughters.

== Early life ==
As a child, Braithwaite would take apart his toys at Christmas and transform them into circuits using recycled household materials. Braithwaite entered the field of engineering. One of the first things he did on his journey to becoming an engineer was taking a correspondence course in Diesel Engineering. After the correspondence course in Diesel Engineering, Braithwaite went on to apprentice in a maritime machine shop.

== Education ==
- Hackney Technical College in London - certificate in Mechanical Engineering
- Moved to Chicago to complete training in Diesel Engineering
- American Institute of Engineering and Technology (1965 BS in engineering)
- University of Washington (1975 MS in Computer Science)
- Massachusetts Institute of Technology (Boeing Sloan Fellow) (1981 Master’s degree in business management)
- After retirement from Boeing, Braithwaite pursued his Ph.D. in technology and business processes from the University of Washington and completed it at Rushmore University

== Career ==
Receiving the Sloan Fellowship award allowed Braithwaite to acquire a degree in business management which led to his career with Boeing. To qualify for the Fellowship one has to have a Ph.D. or equivalent in chemistry, computer science, Earth system science, economics, mathematics, molecular biology, neuroscience, physics, or a related field. At this time, as listed above, Braithwaite had a degree in Computer Science, Diesel Engineering, and Mechanical Engineering. Although he did not have a Ph.D., he proved with his continuous attendance of school that he was eager to learn and with all the time spent earning degrees he had acquired a great deal of knowledge.

As of 2003 he was one of the highest-ranking black-executives in Boeing’s history.

== Awards ==
- 1987: Joseph Marie Jacquard Memorial Award from the American Institute of Manufacturing Technology
- 1995: Black Engineer of the Year
- 1996: Seattle-based Museum of History and Industry’s History Makers Award in Science and Technology
- 1998: Honorary doctor of laws degree from University of the West Indies
- 2017: Pathfinder Award from Museum of Flight

== Awards inspired in honor of Braithwaite ==
Walt W. Braithwaite BEYA Legacy Award (sometimes referred to as Special Recognition Award). The award is usually appointed at the BEYA STEM Conference, which has been held every year since 1987. The BEYA STEM Community, offers K-12 students, college students, corporate, government, military professionals, business, and industry employers with three days of learning, networking, celebrating excellence, and showcasing STEM career opportunities.

== Outreach & community involvement ==
Walt Braithwaite is a Sigma Pi Phi fraternity member. Braithwaite is a role model for African Americans in and outside of the field of engineering. He is a volunteer for the YMCA Black Achievers Program.
