= Ednorah Nahar =

American elocutionist

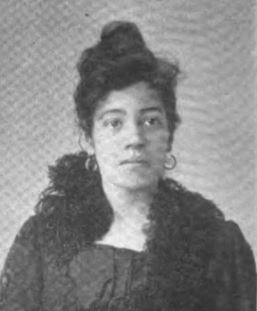
- Born: Ednorah E. Nahar; 1873; Boston, Massachusetts
- Died: November 14, 1936; Westfield, Massachusetts
- Other names: Ednora
- Occupation: Dramatic speaker
- Years active: 1886–1920

Ednorah Nahar (1873-1936) was an African American elocutionist from Boston who flourished between the late 1880s and early 1900s giving dramatic recitations throughout the United States, as well as abroad.

== Early life ==
Ednorah Nahar was born in 1873 (Note: There was a "colored" female child born to Edwin H. and Amelia Narr on November 28, 1862. The occupation of Narr was given as barber and the couple's address was 73 Southac.) in Boston to Amelia (née St. Pierre) and Edwin H. Nahar. She came from a well-known family in Boston and was a cousin to Joan Imogen Howard. Her father was of foreign birth (Note: There is an Edwin Nahar listed a mulatto and who had immigrated from Mexico as a nine-year-old child with the merchant J. P. Nahar. When Nahar's father married, he stated that his father was John P. and mother Amelia M., that he was a barber and was born in Massachusetts. The 1860 census shows a mulatto, Edwin H. Nahar, who was a barber, living with John W. Bolling and Amanda M. Bolling.) and she was sometimes described as a light-skinned Spaniard or Indian. By 1879, she was enrolled in the Bowdoin School for girls and after completing her grammar school, enrolled in Fort Edward Collegiate Institute in Fort Edward, New York. Her aptitude for elocution was acclaimed and she was assigned a group of younger children to teach, while she continued her studies. In addition, she took acting courses at the Madison Dramatic School of Dion Boucicault in New York City.

== Career ==
Nahar had her stage debut on November 16, 1886. Within a year, she had given readings at the Chickering Hall, becoming only the second black woman to perform there. On November 17, 1890, she appeared before a crowd of 5,000 accompanied by the United States Marine Band at the Academy of Music in Philadelphia. Nahar traveled widely, performing in ten of the British West Indies colonies and thirty-one US states. By 1893, she had performed over 800 concerts, acting as her manager and in February of that year, she began to manage for other performers, such as Sissieretta Jones. She appeared with Jones in her 1893 concert tour at Carnegie Hall. Nahar was often mentioned as one of the best elocutionists of the day, along with Hallie Q. Brown and Henrietta Vinton Davis and was praised for her management of concert tours.

In 1896, she planned a trip to Europe including venues in London and Paris and in 1899, Nahar made a trip to London, under the patronage of the Consuelo Vanderbilt, Duchess of Marlborough. She continued performing in the United States through the 1900s performing dramas and also singing. By 1905, she was a resident of New York City

== Later years ==
On February 28, 1916, Nahar married William F. X. Dierkes, an osteopath and Spanish-American War veteran in Boone, Iowa,. After being involved in an automobile accident., she cut back her appearances, the last one in 1920.

The Dierkes family moved to Westfield, Massachusetts, by 1923, where Dr. Dierkes set up a private medical practice. The health of both husband and wife began to fail near the end of 1936, with Ednorah dying on November 14 and her husband following her four weeks later.
