= John P. Turner =

African American surgeon and hospital administrator (1895–1958)

- Born: John Patrick Turner; November 1, 1895; Raleigh, North Carolina, US
- Died: September 14, 1958 (aged 62); Detroit, Michigan, US
- Education: College of the City of New York; Shaw University; University of Pennsylvania Medical School; Jefferson Medical College
- Occupations: Surgeon, physician, and hospital administrator
- Family: Marion Turner Stubbs (daughter)

John Patrick Turner (November 1, 1895 – September 14, 1958) was an African American physician, surgeon, hospital administrator, and educator in Philadelphia, Pennsylvania. He was chief of the surgical department and staff president of Frederick Douglass Memorial Hospital and Training School, later Mercy-Douglass Hospital, in Philadelphia. Turner was the first Black member of the Philadelphia Board of Education, serving in that capacity for 35 years. He was also the medical inspector of Philadelphia's public schools for nineteen years.

== Early life ==
Turner was born on November 1, 1885, in Raleigh, North Carolina. His parents were Jennie Virginia and Jesse Edward Turner. He attended public schools in Raleigh. After his family moved to New York City, New York, he attended Public School No. 60. He then attended the College of the City of New York.

== Education ==
When he was seventeen years old, Turner enrolled in the Leonard Medical School at Shaw University, graduating in 1906. His residency was at the Frederick Douglass Memorial Hospital and Training School in Philadelphia, Pennsylvania.

He pursued graduate studies at University of Pennsylvania Medical School from 1920 to 1921, with a concentration on surgery. Later in the 1920s, Turner attended Jefferson Medical College and Philadelphia General Hospital for a postgraduate study of internal medicine. He followed this by studying contagious diseases at Municipal Hospital in Philadelphia. He toured Europe in 1930 to observe hospital techniques and management.

== Career ==
Turner's entire medical career was spent in Philadelphia where he continued his affiliation with the Frederick Douglass Memorial Hospital. He became the medical inspector of Philadelphia's public schools in 1912, continuing in that position for nineteen years and examining some 75,000 children. In October 1914, Turner spoke to the International Congress of Home Education at its convention in Philadelphia.

In 1921, Turner published the book Ringworm and Its Successful Treatment. Also in 1921, he founded and was the president of the Pennsylvania State Medical, Dental and Pharmaceutical Association and became the 22nd president of the National Medical Association. He became the first Black police surgeon of Philadelphia in 1931 and continued in this capacity for twenty years. He secured this position through a competitive examination.

In 1935, Turner was the first Black to be appointed to the Philadelphia Board of Education and served in this position for 23 years. In this capacity, he advocated for smaller class sizes, modern equipment, more adequate classroom supplies, and for public education to start with kindergarten.

Also in 1935, he became the chief of the surgical department of Douglass Hospital. In 1938, he was promoted to staff president. After Douglass Hospital merged with Mercy Hospital, he continued as the staff president of Mercy-Douglass Hospital.

During World War II, he volunteered for the United States Army Medical Service Corps, served on the Philadelphia Public Defense Committee, and was chairman of Local Draft Board No. 73. He joined the Advisory Committee on City Hospitals in 1945. His medical public service work focused on treating narcotic addiction. He provided clinical treatment, presented public lectures, and wrote articles for newspapers.

Turner retired in 1948 and became an emeritus surgeon and president emeritus of the staff of Mercy-Douglass Hospital.

== Professional affiliations ==
Turner founded and was the president of the Pennsylvania State Medical, Dental, and Pharmaceutical Association. He was the 22nd president of the National Medical Association and was a member of the editorial board of the Journal of the National Medical Association from 1922 until July 1958.

Turner was a member of the Philadelphia County Medical Society, the Pennsylvania State Medical Association, and the American Medical Association.

== Awards and honors ==
- Distinguished Service Medal, National Medical Association. 1946
- Recognition Certificate, Urban League, 1947
- Distinguished Service Award, Pyramid Club of Philadelphia, 1949
- Distinguished Service Award, Shaw University, 1951
- Distinguished Service Scroll, Lambda chapter of the Kappa Alpha Psi at its 30th anniversary
- Member, New York Council of Surgeons, 1955
- John P. Turner Middle School opened in Philadelphia in 1971

== Personal life ==
Turner married Marion Carmiencita Harris of Washington, D.C. in 1908. The couple had one daughter, Marion Virginia Turner. The family was part of the Black upper class, allowing Marion to became a concert pianist, socialite, and club woman. They lived at 1705 W. Jefferson Street in Philadelphia.

Turner served on the board of directors of the Sesquicentennial Exposition of 1926. In 1935, he joined the board of directors of the Metropolitan Y.M.C.A. in Philadelphia and served as vice president of the National Council of the Y.M.C.A. in 1947. He served on the Recreation Board of Philadelphia, the executive board of the Philadelphia Council of Boy Scouts, the board of directors of the Community Chest of Pennsylvania, the board of the Americans for the Competitive Enterprise System, and was a member of the Philadelphia Welfare Commission. He was chairman of the Crime Prevention Association and vice president of the Police Athletic League. He was a trustee of Shaw University, Cheyney State College, Berean School in Philadelphia.

He was a member of Kappa Alpha Psi and Sigma Pi Phi. He was also a 33rd-degree Mason and a charter member of Richard Allen Lodge No. 30, F. and A. M. He was a trustee of the Allen A.M.E. Church in Philadelphia for 45 years.

Turner died of prostate cancer on September 14, 1958, in Detroit, Michigan at the age of 72.

== See also ==
- American Black Upper Class
- List of Kappa Alpha Psi members
- List of Perelman School of Medicine at the University of Pennsylvania alumni
