= Jefferson Hospital for Neuroscience =

Coordinates: 39.948095°N 75.156019°W

- Jefferson Health
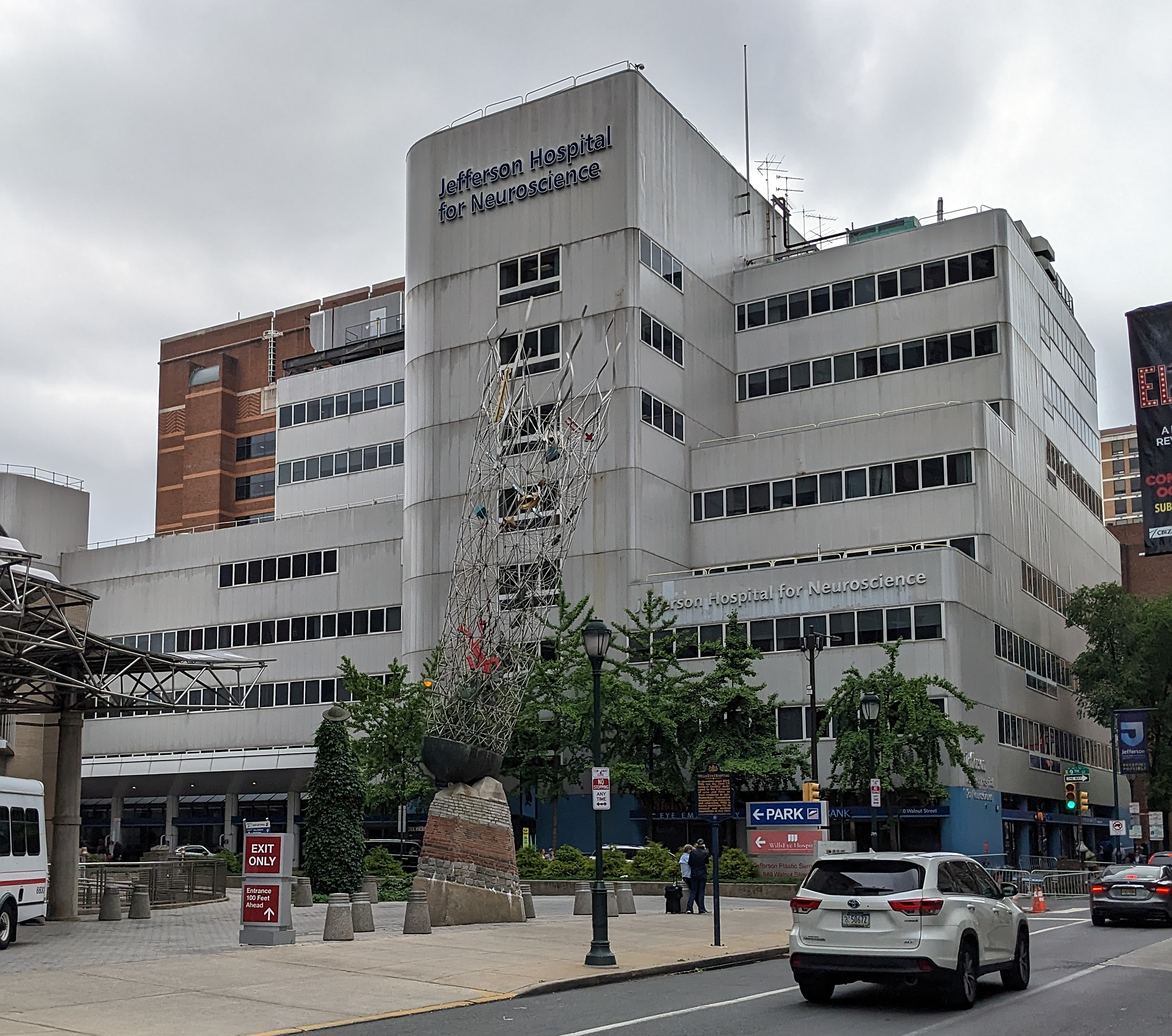
- Jefferson Hospital for Neuroscience

Geography
- Location: 900 Walnut Street, Philadelphia, Pennsylvania, U.S.

Organisation
- Care system: Non-Profit
- Type: Teaching Hospital
- Affiliated university: Thomas Jefferson University

Services
- Emergency department: Level I Trauma Center

Links
- Website: https://www.jeffersonhealth.org/locations/jefferson-hospital-for-neuroscience
- Lists: Hospitals in U.S.

Jefferson Hospital for Neuroscience is a hospital in Center City Philadelphia, affiliated with Thomas Jefferson University and Thomas Jefferson University Hospital in Philadelphia and part of Jefferson Health. The hospital focuses on treating brain-related diseases and disorders. It is the only hospital of its kind in the Philadelphia area.

The hospital annually treats the largest combined volume of brain tumors, spinal cord injuries, aneurysms, and areteriovenous malformations in the Philadelphia metropolitan area.

Jefferson Hospital for Neuroscience was the first in the Delaware Valley to offer a number of technologies including:

- Fractionated stereotactic radiosurgery (also known as stereotactic radiotherapy)
- Gamma Knife®
- Shaped Beam Surgery™
- Minimally invasive neurosurgery utilizing a robotically controlled microscope
- NeuRx DPS™, an FDA-approved device that helps individuals with certain types of spinal cord injuries breathe on their own again

The hospital also established Jefferson Expert Teleconsulting (JET), the first technology of its kind in the region. It is a university-based high-tech mobile robotic teleconsulting system.

== Departments and services ==
Jefferson Hospital for Neuroscience provides medical services across more than 20 specialized centers, programs, departments and divisions.

- Acute Stroke Center
- Brain Aneurysm and AVM center
- Brain Tumor Center
- Comprehensive Concussion Center
- Comprehensive Epilepsy Center
- Comprehensive Multiple Sclerosis Center
- Geriatric Psychiatry Center
- Headache Center
- Jefferson Expert Teleconsulting (JET)
- Mechanical Circulatory Support Program
- Medical Oncology
- Minimally Invasive Cranial Base Surgery Center
- Movement Disorders Program
- Neurological Surgery
- Neurology
- Neuroradiology-Head and Neck Imaging
- Ophthalmology
- Radiation Oncology
- Rehabilitation Medicine
- Spine Program
- Stereotactic Radiosurgery Program
