= Frederick Douglass Memorial Hospital and Training School =

Former hospital in Philadelphia

Coordinates: 39.9449°N 75.1681°W

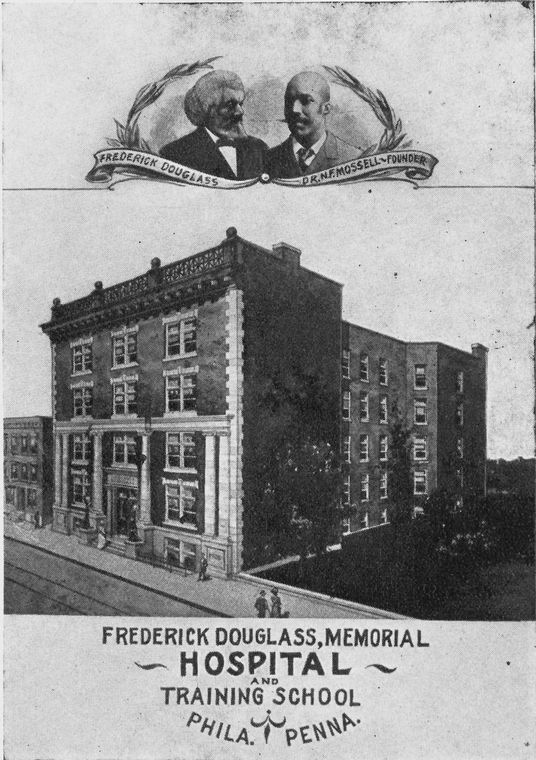

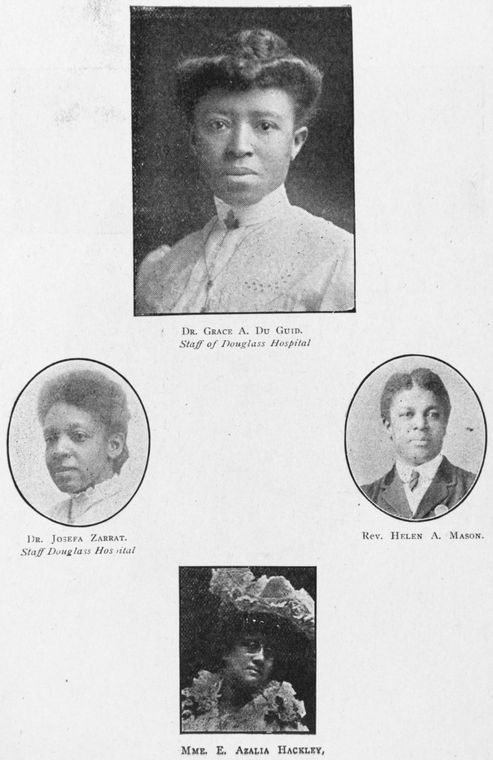
Staff of Douglass Hospital, 1910

Frederick Douglass Memorial Hospital and Training School, originally Frederick Douglass Memorial Hospital and School for Nurses, opened in 1895 in Philadelphia, Pennsylvania, at 1512 Lombard Street with had 15 beds. It was the city's first hospital for African Americans and the second hospital in the United States for African Americans. In 1897, it graduated its first two nurses. It expanded and in 1948 merged with Mercy Hospital to form Mercy-Douglass Hospital in hopes of improving both of their both of their financials conditions. Mercy-Douglas closed in 1973.

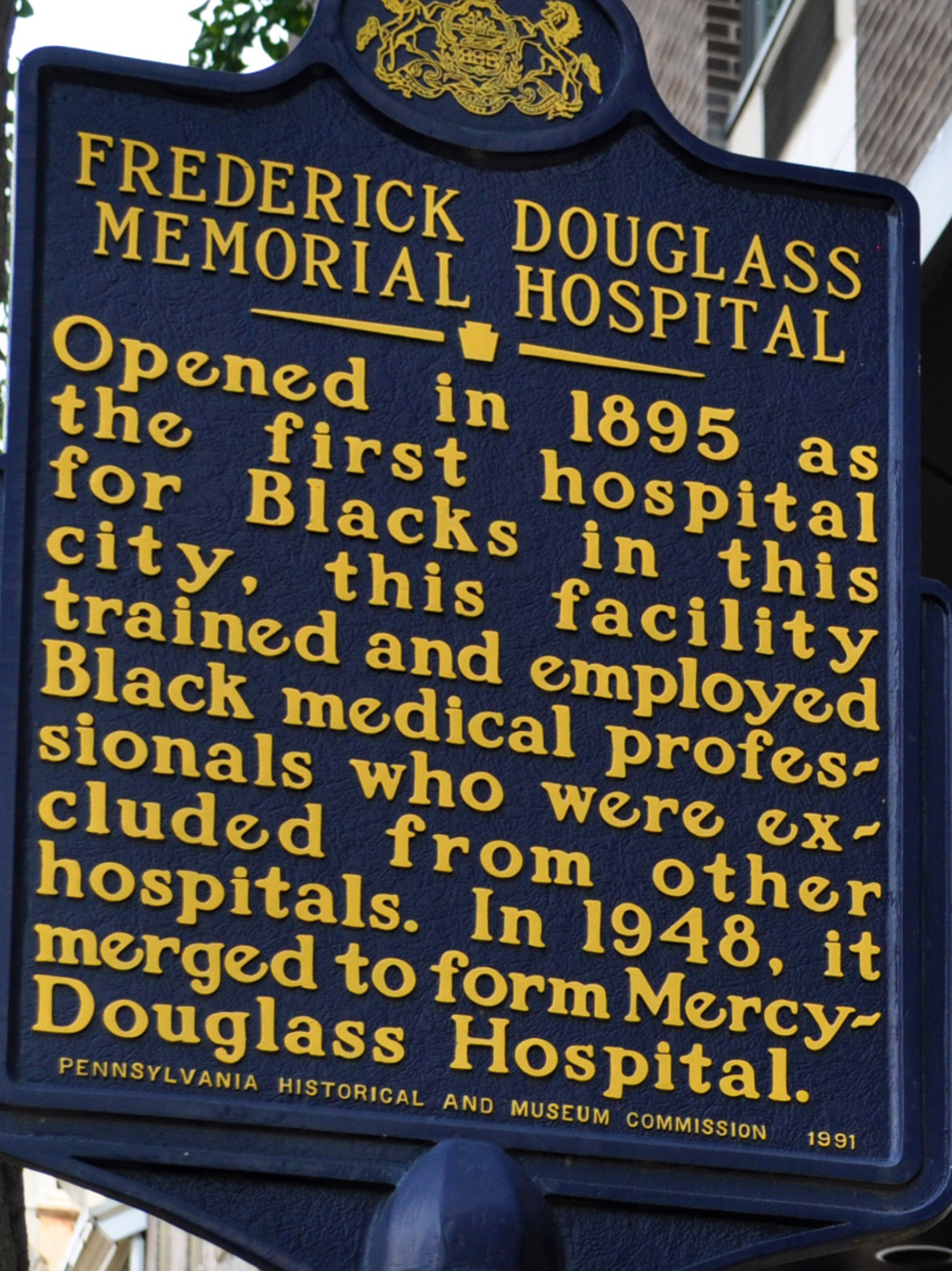
Historical marker at 1526 Lombard Street

Nathan F. Mossell served as chief of staff. His brother Aaron Albert Mossell was the hospital's lawyer.

Edwin C. J. T. Howard, one of the first black doctors to graduate from Harvard Medical School, was instrumental in the hospital's formation.

William Albert Sinclair was its financial secretary beginning in 1904. He wrote Aftermath of Slavery.

John P. Turner completed his residency at the hospital in 1906 and, then, joined its staff. He became the chief of its surgery department in 1935 and the president of staff in 1938, serving in that position until he retired as an emeritus surgeon and president emeritus of the staff of Mercy-Douglass Hospital in 1948.

Turner's son-in-law, Frederick Douglass Stubbs, became the chief of thoracic surgery at the Frederick Douglass Memorial Hospital in 1938. Time (magazine) featured Stubb's groundbreaking use of thoracoplasty at Douglass Hospital in April 1940.
