= Hahnemann Hospital (Worcester) =

Hospital in Massachusetts

- UMass Memorial Health
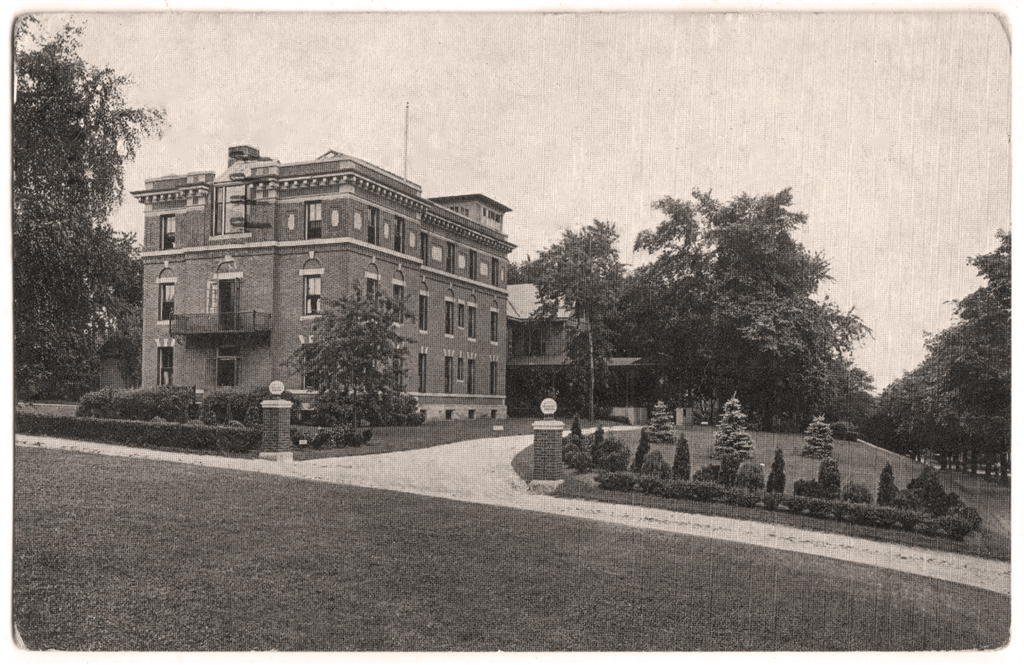
- 1925 postcard

Geography
- Location: Worcester, Massachusetts, United States
- Coordinates: 42.2855°N 71.7904°W

Links
- Lists: Hospitals in Massachusetts

Hahnemann Hospital was an independent hospital located in Worcester, Massachusetts. It was established in 1896 and was named after Samuel Hahnemann. In 1989 the hospital merged with the Memorial Hospital, later becoming the UMass Memorial Medical Center.
