= Ted Ellis (artist) =

American painter (born 1963)

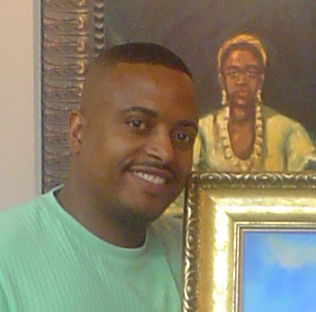
- Ted Ellis
- Born: 1963 (age 62–63); New Orleans, Louisiana
- Education: Self-taught
- Known for: Visual artist/chemist

Ted Ellis (born 1963) is an American artist and former environmental chemist. Ellis is best known for his African-American themed art and styles which blend elements of folk art, naturalism and impressionism. His personal rendition of Barack Obama in acrylic, Obama, the 44th President, was presented in honor of the 2009 Presidential Inauguration.

Ellis' art business has sold over 1.75 million fine art products, and he works with a number of prominent corporations. He is also known for his community work, especially advancing arts in children's education.

== Personal life and early career ==
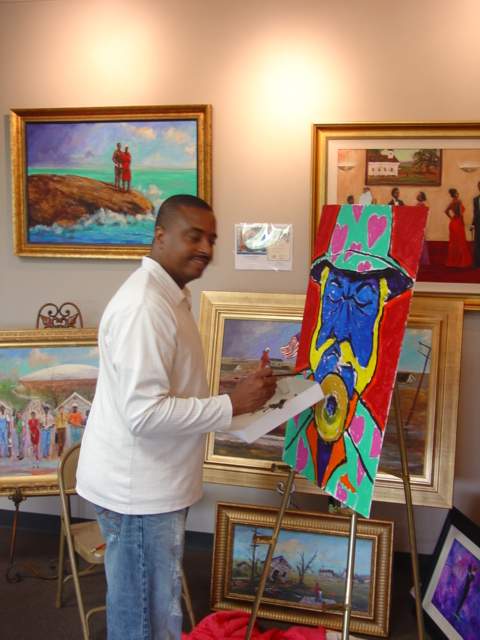
Ted Ellis creating art.

Born and raised in New Orleans, Louisiana, to a professional musician-father and a housewife-mother, Ellis' earliest hints of artistic talent began to show at five-years-old. Ellis' first attempt at art was a third-grade freehand sketch of a dog from Archie Comics, which he drew so accurately that friends and family believed it had been traced. Growing up, one of his favorite characters to draw was Wile E. Coyote, and as an adult he continues to enjoy comic books as "refreshing".

When he was old enough, Ellis would ride the bus alone to downtown New Orleans so as to be exposed to and spend time with the area artists. He and his friends would in their spare time compete with one another to see who could draw the best designs, and Ellis continued developing his art skills throughout primary school despite only receiving "satisfactory" marks in art class. In elementary school he attended a summer program at the New Orleans Center for Creative Arts, and later attended an after-school program at Lawless High School. Ellis says that he knew he wanted to be an artist in the seventh grade, and credits his teacher in that class for keeping him focused.

Ellis worked for a time with charcoal and pastel before settling on oil and acrylic. He took art classes during high school and enrolled in four months of private art lessons, but is otherwise self-taught. Ellis followed advice from Anna Torregano, his mentor, friend and high school art teacher, and his parents, all of whom advised him to pursue an academic career so as not to become a "starving artist". His mother especially stressed university and earning a professional degree.

Ellis earned a B.Sc. in chemistry at Dillard University on a United States Army ROTC scholarship as well as academic scholarship, and went on to be commissioned a second lieutenant in the United States Army's Field Artillery Branch. Ellis spent the next ten years working in the field of chemistry, eight years of which were as an environmental chemist at Rollins Engineering Services.

Ellis has lived in Louisiana and California and currently resides in Friendswood, Texas with his wife, Erania. They have a daughter, Chaney, and a son, Tanner. Chaney is an aspiring rap artist and has produced a parent-friendly CD about school and drugs titled Off the Chain.

== Art career ==
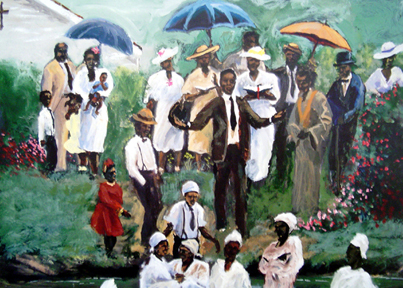
Thee Baptism, Ted Ellis' first widely sold art.

Ellis maintained a passion for art that preceded his professional art career; he painted throughout his time in the Army and as an environmental chemist, generally working out of a studio in his garage. His first commissions were produced for two co-workers at Rollins. They had wanted to purchase the piece that he was then working on, but he refused and instead offered to paint them two similar pieces, which they purchased for $40.

When he first got started, Ellis passed on an opportunity to do work for the J. C. Penney catalog because he was too busy, but ultimately found success in a similar publication.

Ellis published his first prints through Market Arts' Dan Rose in Houston, but his art career took off when he noticed that his wife's Avon boutique magazine, targeted at African-Americans, lacked any art. He sent Avon a proposal which they accepted, and through the magazine he sold 42,610 signed prints of Thee Baptism. Since he was still working as an engineer at the time, he autographed the tens-of-thousands of prints during his lunch-break.

After quitting his job as an engineer in 1996, Ellis competed against 500 others for, and won, a 1998 Walt Disney Studios commission for art in honor of Black History Month. The piece was used in the 1999 celebration at Epcot Center and appeared on T-shirts, souvenir-mugs, and posters.

=== Art Business ===
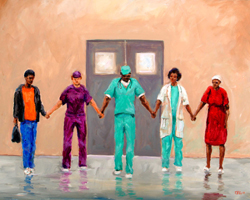
Prayers Heal depicts a surgeon who later bought it.

Ellis has marketed and sold his art throughout his career. He was monetizing his creative talents in high school when he and his classmates sold their custom designed T-shirts, first to their school's juniors and seniors, and then throughout the school district.

In building his art business over two decades, Ellis engaged in fact-finding missions in search of financial patrons and customers at art festivals, conventions, reunions and libraries, as well as local businesses. Ellis incorporated his business in 1991. He credits his time at Rollins for teaching him that "if you have a quality product and a good form of distribution, you'll succeed".

When he started, Ellis quickly realized that talent was not alone enough after he had to approach 30–40 galleries until he was picked up by two, one of which closed down. He says that "it's a lot of marketing, planning, exhibiting and a lot of rejection".

Ellis' wife Erenia, a loan officer, manages his business, "T. Ellis Art, Incorporated", out of a League City, Texas studio. Ellis has sold more than 1.75 million fine art products across the country through direct sales, art galleries, catalog outlets, fine art dealers, and licensing, and has marketed community partnership opportunities meant to educate and empower communities by offering maximum returns on minimal investments. In 2005 he signed for representation with art licensing agency "Alaska Momma" with the intent of opening new merchandising avenues in home décor, furnishings, calendars, apparel and stationery.

Ellis has affiliated with and had art commissioned by corporations like Walt Disney Studios, Minute Maid, Coca-Cola, Marathon Oil, ExxonMobil, State Farm Insurance, Merck Pharmaceutical, J. C. Penney, Southland Corporation, and Avon Products, Philip Morris USA and Integrity Music.

Ellis' works have been sold through Army and Air Force Exchange Service catalogs and were available exclusively both through Avon's African American Boutique as well as their core brochures.

One of his first major sales was of an original depicting a God-like surgeon in an operating-room, sold to the surgeon. Ellis' art has sold for prices ranging from $750 to $30,000.

While Ellis initially had hoped to build his business up to Fortune 500 stature, he now finds satisfaction in "helping others through art".

=== Hurricane Katrina ===
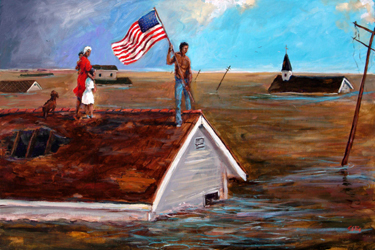
Surviving Katrina, inspired by the hope he saw in a lone man rebuilding in New Orleans in the days after Hurricane Katrina/whose flag represents the need for the nation to unite behind those rebuilding.

Ellis and his wife are both natives of New Orleans, and much of his art along with his passion for art are inspired by the vibrant city. As a young man, he would search the colorful French Quarter for subjects to paint. In the aftermath of Hurricane Katrina and the devastation of parts of the city, the city's role in his art drastically changed so as to reflect the story of hope and rebirth that he saw in the disaster.

On the night before the storm hit Louisiana, the Ellis home in Texas was a refuge for 10 New Orleans families, 50 people in all. After the storm, Ellis helped fly home friends stranded outside New Orleans, and he organized colleagues in the art community behind the relief effort.

Ellis was allowed to enter the city two weeks after the flood waters subsided in order to survey the damage to his mother's home in the Lower Ninth Ward and salvage her possessions. While travelling among the destroyed houses and deserted city, Ellis witnessed a lone man repairing his home's roof. The contrast resonated with Ellis, and he memorialized the hope he saw in the man's actions through his piece Surviving Katrina. The scene is of rising floodwater that traps a family on their house's roof while the father holds up the Flag of the United States, a flag that to Ellis symbolizes the need for the nation to come together to aid those affected by the storm.

In Life Begins Anew, a father holds a baby above floodwaters while another man reaches out to take the child. Ellis describes the scene as symbolizing the promise of a new beginning for those who survived Katrina and its aftermath.

As its title indicates, the Katrina: The Hope, Healing and Rebirth of New Orleans collection was for Ellis about showing the power of art to assist the healing process: "The largest piece I did is about how life begins anew and how a person can find hope even after such devastation. I want this work to be uplifting, to be a fresh breath of life for the community."

=== Obama Portrait ===
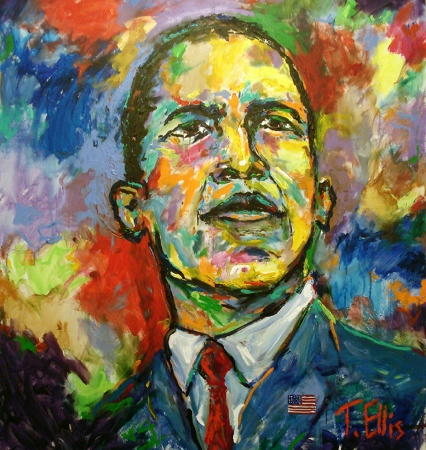
The many colors represent the unity that Ellis saw in the inauguration of Obama, the 44th President.

One of Ellis' more famous works is an abstract depiction of Barack Obama's signature 'hope' pose. Ellis painted the portrait in honor of Obama's 2008 Presidential inauguration. In Obama, the 44th President, Ellis uses red, blue, yellow, and green acrylic paint to portray Obama as someone who unites people across lines of color, ethnicity, and religion.

The piece was presented at a January 19, 2009, gala held by the National Black Chamber of Commerce and the National Newspaper Publishers Association Foundation at the Embassy of France in Washington, D.C. The proceeds from the autographed prints sold at the event supported NNPA Foundation and the Howard University School of Communications Building Fund (NNPA Media Wing).

=== African-American history ===
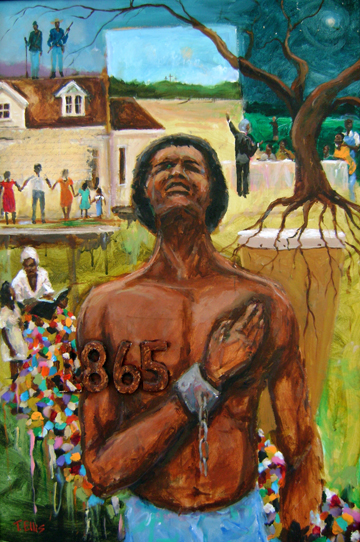
Free At Last depicts several themes from African-American history.

In 2009, Ellis produced an exhibit focusing on the theme of African-American history in light of slavery and emancipation. The exhibit, American Slavery: The Reason Why We're Here, tied into the Juneteenth commemoration of slavery's abolition in the State of Texas. It was located at and included tours of the historic residence of horticulturist Henry Stringfellow, an innovator in organic gardening who was enlightened in how he employed of freedmen. Ellis began the series of works at a 2006 exhibition at the same house.

The exhibit's more than 20 paintings were painted with brush and fingers, and Ellis sometimes added a collage of documents. The exhibit included images of the transportation of slaves, the industry of slavery in crop production, and the abolition of slavery.

The painting Free At Last includes depictions of Buffalo soldiers, Harriet Tubman, the year "1865", a mighty oak, and in the background, their heads bowed in prayer, the figures of the current owner and restorer of the house, Sam Collins III, and his wife and children. The exhibit also displayed Ellis' famous depiction of Barack Obama, Obama, the 44th President.

Ellis' art was featured at a 2011 exhibition at the Rosa Parks Library and Museum. The Museum, at Troy University in Montgomery, Alabama, hosted the exhibit, called Our History, Heritage, and Culture: An American Story, the Art of Ted Ellis, as part of its celebration of Black History Month.

Ellis has been pictorially documenting African-American lifestyle, history and culture for thirty years. Ellis paintings are in the permanent collection of the DuSable museum, Charles Wright museum, the McKenna museum, Free People of Color Museum, and the Amistad Research Center. The City of Selma, Alabama, commissioned Ellis as the official artist for the 50th anniversary for the civil rights march, known as "Bloody Sunday". The City and County of Galveston, Texas, recognized Ellis for the 150th anniversary of Juneteenth. The Juneteenth Freedom Project was exhibited at the State Capitol in Washington, DC at the U.S. Senate Rotunda and House of Representatives Rayburn Building. President Barack Obama and the First Lady, Michelle Obama of the White House has thanked Ellis for his art and giving.

Ellis painting of the Tuskegee airmen, "The Lonely Angels" was signed by all the Tuskegge Airmen who were in attendance to receive their Congressional Medal of Honor from the President. President George W. Bush and Speaker of the House of Representatives Nancy Pelosi stand amidst 300 Tuskegee Airmen during a photo opportunity Thursday, March 29, 2007, in Statuary Hall at the U.S. Capitol. White House.

== Educational work ==
Ellis views education as one of his primary missions, and he is involved with several educational initiatives. He has a run a number of art workshops with children, including drawing and touching up the school mural which local sixth-graders paint every year, and joining with his wife Erania to illustrate while she reads aloud to children from books about topics like the Buffalo Soldiers. When working with children with autism, he employs a strategy of engaging the children's creativity in a non-judgemental setting where there is no wrong way for them to express themselves; he hopes to put their art on display at the Houston Children's Museum.

He has partnered with the Tom Joyner Foundation to fund-raise for students, while "Art with a Purpose", his own nonprofit program, was awarded a federal grant to help disadvantaged students.

Ellis serves together with Gregory Michael Carter as an artist-in-residence for an arts enrichment program at a Galveston, Texas charter school, "Ambassadors Preparatory Academy". The program, called "Ambassadors for Art", is led by school administrators and members of the community through the Gulf Coast Apollo Chapter of nonprofit volunteer service organization The Links, Incorporated. Ambassadors for Art also took part in painting a bust of US President Barack Obama. The bust was one of 45 painted by artists nationwide which were displayed in Detroit's Museum of African American History, part of a project supported by the Smithsonian Institution. Additionally, Ellis' work has been showcased in numerous magezines including Upscale, Southern Living, and Newsweek.

He has also worked with other arts education programs like the Peoria Public Schools' "Artreach", in the framework of which he donated five original pieces to the schools and District 150 Foundation.

Since October 2023, Ellis has been the Director of Florida State University's Civil Rights Institute. Which works to connect with students and promote the legacy of the U.S. Civil Rights Movement. The institute collaborates with numerous departments and organizations within FSU and throughout Florida in order to preserve the oral traditions of previously underrepresented people(s), working to promote racial equity in local communities. Ellis stepped down from his role as director in June 2026.

== Style ==
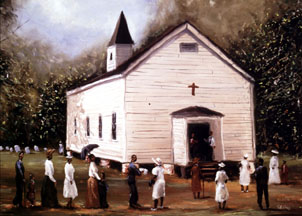
Sunday Worship is Ellis' most popular work and personal favorite.

Ellis has over his career created art in a number of styles and has incorporated several primary influences.

African American history and African American culture play central roles in Ellis' art, which regularly feature themes like Buffalo Soldiers, cotton fields, and Jazz music; his Jazz works especially lean towards the impressionistic. Other common themes range from fisherman to religious scenes as in Thee Baptism, My Father's Baptism, and Deacon's Door, to African ethnic scenes like Afrimage and Ashanti.

The Church-related themes in his art he attributes to formative experiences with his mother at their local house of worship, "Beulah Land Church".

While he is best known for his ethnic art, many of Ellis' pieces are landscapes, seascapes, and portraits.

Ellis is a self-taught artist. He has describes his style at times as "conventional realism", as a bold blend of realism and impressionism, and as impressionist and naturalist, an old masters' style that is sometimes figurative and sometimes folk art. "I try to capture the essence in one stroke" he said.

Ellis has also coined the term "Tedism" to describe his style. "Tedism" blends impressionism, soul, and folk stories to create representational pieces.

Ellis considers himself to be a social, political and spiritual artist as well as educator and "creative historian". "I paint subjects that are representative of the many facets of American life as I know it" says Ellis. "I like to think of myself as a creative historian. I was put here to record history...all aspects of American culture and heritage. My sole purpose has always been to educate through my art". He draws inspiration from people's memories of family or from history, and says that he's "a history buff at heart. I read a lot, and I have more books than paint."

As an artist who focuses on African American history, Ellis intentionally does not approach its difficult chapters from a position of pain: "I have to be careful what I do [...] there's a power to art. I don't want to be from an angry position. That's out there, and maybe they do that to shake you up and make you think. I want to be one step ahead. When you're talking about healing, you're in the right zone." As such, his images of slavery and historical Southern life focus on positive values such as family, character, and church.

Ellis attributes a love for and influence in his art to New Orleans and the city's creative culture. He compared the city to an incubator for young talent. Ellis accredits the city as offering him art clubs and opportunities to design murals for school and create signs for special events, as well as access to art classes, summer art programs, and the vibrant Jackson Square where he could talk with and get to know many artists.

Ellis' favorite artists include Henry Ossawa Tanner, Edward Bannister, Jacob Lawrence, Samella Lewis, and John T. Scott, while among his work the favorite painting is Sunday Worship.

== Achievements ==
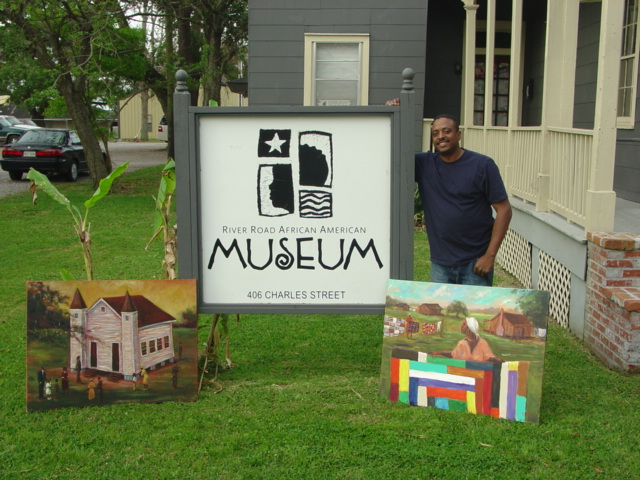
Ellis' work has been exhibited at and is on permanent display at several museums.

Ellis and his artwork have been widely recognized and honored in many venues.

Ellis's art was featured in 1992 and 1993 for Black History Month at the Irving Arts Center in Irving, Texas, near Dallas. The 1993 exhibit, Realism, Symbolism, and Abstraction: Images from the African American Experience, jointly featured artist Albert M. Shaw.

Ellis was selected to creation of Walt Disney World 1998 commemorative Black History Poster. Other than that, he was official artist for the 50th anniversary of Bloody Sunday for the city of Selma, Alabama. Ted was Art ambassador for the City and County of Galveston, TX celebrating 150th anniversary of Juneteenth showcasing at the U.S. Capitol in Washington DC.

The Ivory Coast II was featured on children's television show Barney & Friends. In 1997 his African-Americans in Law was unveiled and displayed in New Orleans City Hall.

He was named Black Heritage Artist of the Year 1998 at Baltimore's Black Heritage Visual Arts Expo and painted the presentation poster for event sponsor PepsiCola.

Ellis was the Heritage Arts Festival's winner of the Pallette Award for Impressionism in 2002

In 2005, he was named "Entrepreneur of the Year" by the National Black Chamber of Commerce.

Amistad Research Center at Tulane University in 2005 recognized Ted Ellis as a historical artist and mounted a week-long exhibition of his paintings in the Audubon Zoo's Tropical Bird House. The exhibit, Reflections of African American Culture: Paintings by Ted Ellis, was co-hosted by the Audubon Nature Institute. A reception held in Uptown New Orleans' Audubon Tea Room included an exhibition of Ellis' works entitled A Celebration of African American Art and Culture: Paintings by Ted Ellis. Ellis donated two of the exhibition's pieces to the center: We Are Americans (2002) and The Struggle Continues (2003). He also chose the center to be the repository for his papers including the yearly donation of a piece of art to his collection there.

Ellis featured in a Houston City Council meeting chaired by mayor Bill White where council member Sue Lovell declared May 23, 2006 "Ted Ellis Day", citing Ellis' contributions as a leading African American contemporary artist who in his art captures American culture. The Austin, Texas-based George Washington Carver Museum and Cultural Center in 2006 hosted Ellis' exhibition, Say My Name.

In 2007, Ellis' work was exhibited at "Embrace: the Fine Art Fair of the National Black Arts Festival". In February of that year he was profiled in the "11th Annual Citywide African American Art Exhibition" at the Houston Museum of Fine Arts. He was a 2007 Honoree of the National Black MBA Association.

Several of Ellis' works are in the permanent collections of the DuSable Museum of African American History in Chicago, the Charles H. Wright Museum of African American History in Detroit, Walt Disney Studios, the McKenna Museum of African American Art and the Free People of Color Museum in New Orleans, and the Amistad Research Center at Tulane University.

A "Ted Ellis Day" was declared for February 21, 2009, by W. Wesley Perry, the mayor of Midland, Texas. In 2009, Houston Citizens Chamber of Commerce awarded Ted Ellis one of four 15th Annual African-American Business Achievement Pinnacle Awards for his success in his art business.

In 2010, New Orleans African American Museum recognized Ellis as an Art Ambassador and hosted an exhibition of his work, "Sumpt'n to See, Native Son Comes Home".

Ellis has been recognized in proclamations by Governor of Texas Rick Perry, Texas State Representative Sylvester Turner, Louisiana Lt. Gov. Mitch Landrieu, as well as Baton Rouge mayor Melvin Holden.

Louisiana State Senate resolution number 88, brought by Senator Karen Carter Peterson in 2012, also commends and recognizes Ellis for his accomplishments and contributions.

He has been featured at the New Orleans Jazz Festival, won Grand Prize Best of Show and Patrons Award at Fairhope, Alabama's Fairhope Arts Festival, and was honored as the "Official Artist" of the 2006 Essence Music Festival. He was also featured at the Bayou City Art Festival and the Charleston Annual Fine Arts Weekend in 2005.

Ellis is a frequent speaker at Avon President's Luncheon and other corporate functions.

Ellis' art has been purchased by celebrities like Bryant Gumbel, Angela Bassett, Johnnie Cochran, Blair Underwood, Susan L. Taylor, Joyce M. Roche, Spike Lee and Brad Pitt.

In 2017, Ellis received proclamation from The Senate of the State of Texas for his exhibition Pride, Dignity and Courage: celebrating African-American History and Culture".

== Charity Work ==
Ellis is involved with various causes and charitable organizations including United Way, ICLS, African American Visual Arts Association, Jack and Jill of America Inc., the United Negro College Fund, Heritage Christian Academy, and various public school districts. He was the featured artist of Big Brothers Big Sisters 2012 "Houston's Big Black Tie Ball" fundraiser gala and is a partner of the Houston Child Protective Services Black History Program.

== Views on African American art ==
In a column published in Images Magazine, Ellis calls on the younger generations of black artists to recognize the hardship faced by and the effort put in by the previous generation of black artists in order to pave the way for the newer generation to be able to succeed, and to do so with far less difficulty.

He says African-American are still not within the mainstream, and despite being the most financially minded black artists yet, that the current generation still earns less than it should. Ellis further assigns partial responsibility on an academic world that he sees as not paying sufficient attention to the genre.

He believes strongly that African-Americans should value their art on their terms, looking past aesthetics, and that only thus will the genre grow and be better appreciated.

== Featured as Cover Art ==
- Go Down Old Hannah: the Living History of African American Texans Naomi Mitchell Carrier ISBN 0-2927224-2-7
- They Dance Alone Christine LeVeaux (2005) ISBN 0-9764844-0-4
- Harlem Renaissance by Ella O. Williams ISBN 1-4343814-0-4
- National Medical Association journal covers
  - Summer 2007, Volume 99, Number 12
  - December 2008, Volume 100, Number 12
  - January 2010, Volume 102, Number 1
- National Directory of African American Organizations 2001–2003 Philip Morris Co. (Keep the Dream Alive)
- Worship in the House was commissioned by Integrity Music to be used as a CD cover.
- Beyond the Blues: Reflections of African America in the Fine Arts Collection of the Amistad Research Center (The Struggle Continues)
- 2006 South Central Region Jack and Jill of America cookbook
- The Ensemble Theatre's 2008 production of Radio Golf playbill cover.

== Works ==
=== Gallery ===
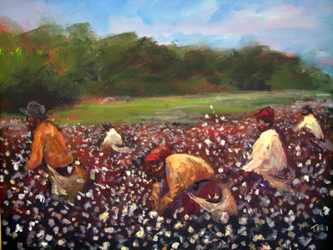
Cotton Pickers, 16x20, original, 1998

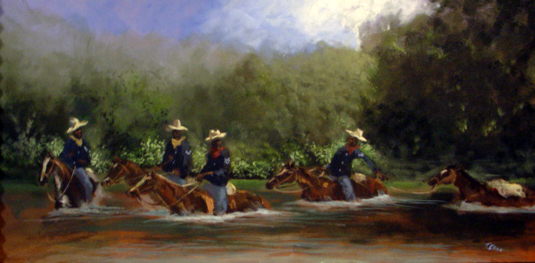
Buffalo Soldiers, 15x30, original, 2001

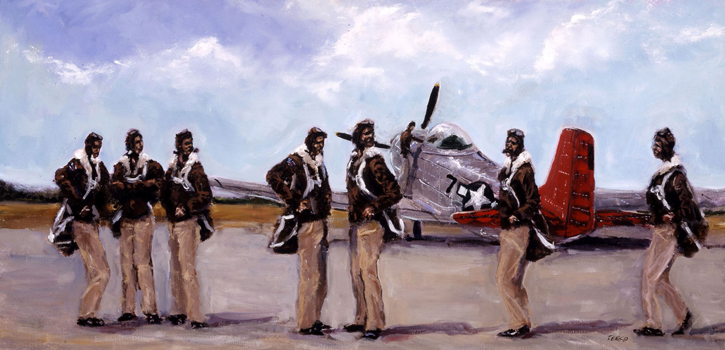
The Lonely Angels, 15x30, original, 2003

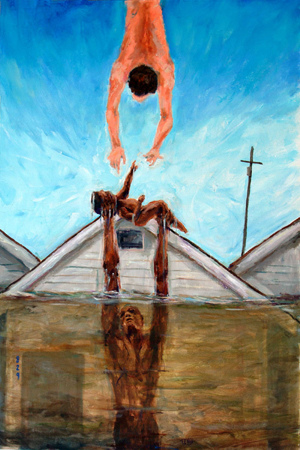
Life Begins Anew, 36x24, original, 2005 a symbol of new beginnings after Hurricane Katrina.

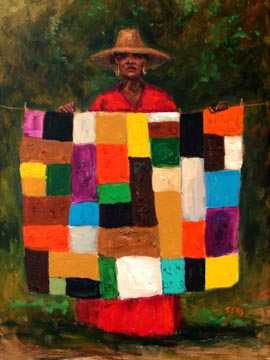
My Old Quilt, 40x30, original, 2008

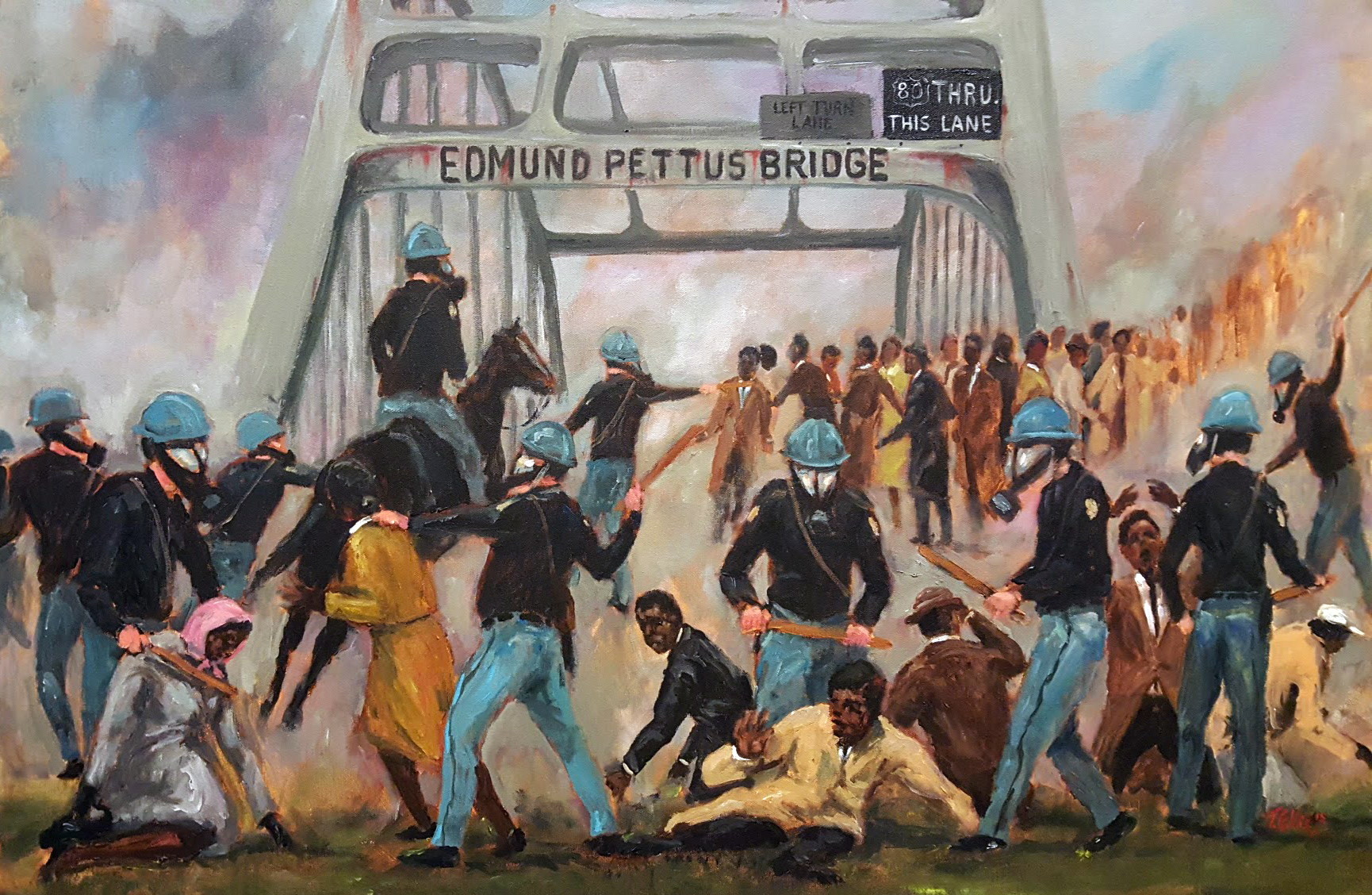
Bloody Sunday, original

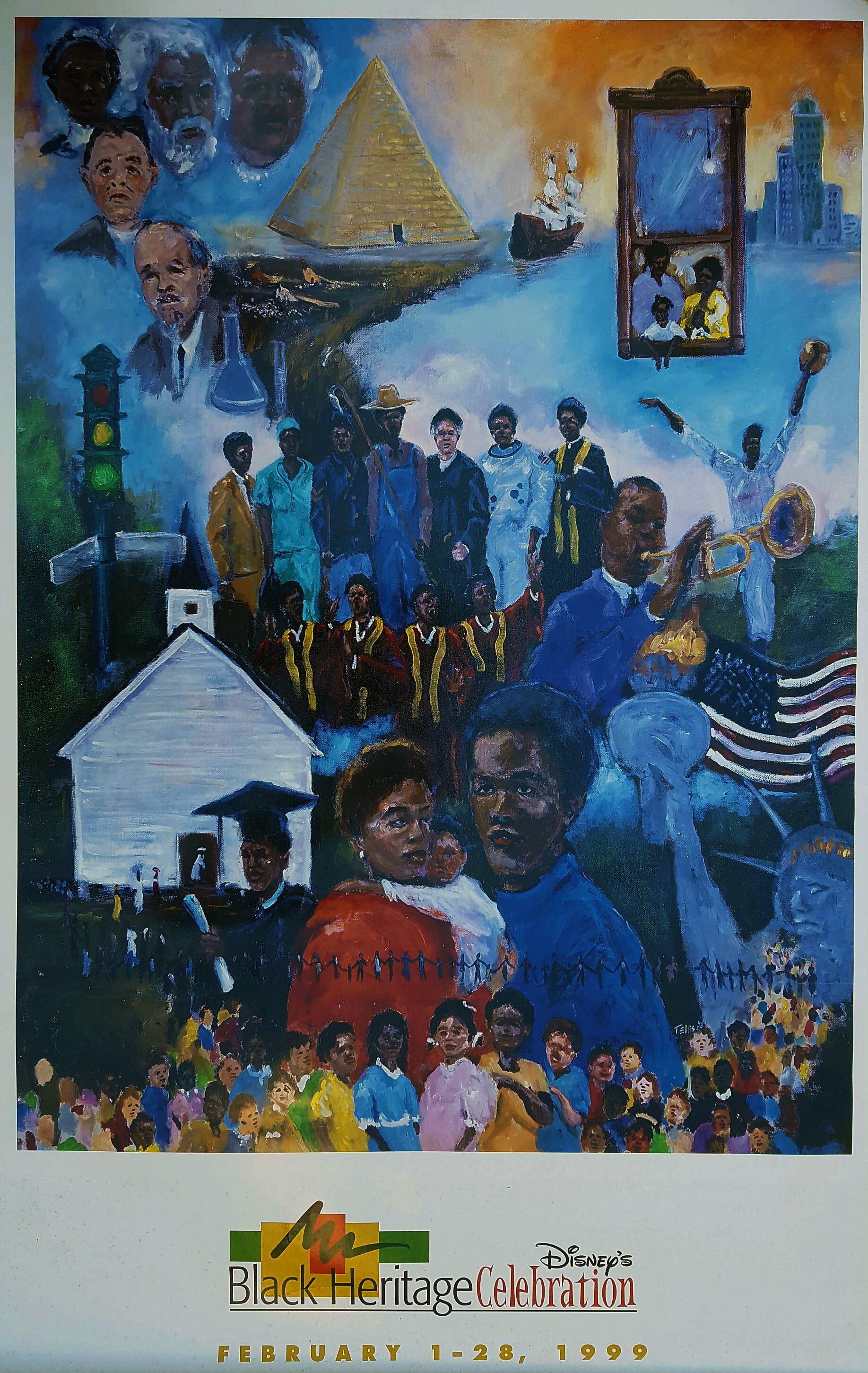
Walt Disney Black Heritage Celebration, original

=== Art Series ===
- Champions of justice- 1996
- Justice: Collection of Artwork inspired by the Legal Profession – New Orleans City Hall, 1999
- Capturing Our Heritage – University of Texas Medical Branch Moody Medical Library, Galveston, 2001
- Born in the Spirit – Penn State Harrisburg Library, 2003
- Katrina: The Hope, Healing and Rebirth of New Orleans – National Bar Association, 2005
- Courage of Conviction: African Americans Serving in the Military from Colonial Time to the President of the U.S. – Stone Mountain Park, 2008/09
- American Slavery: The Reason Why We Are Here – The Beach Institute, Savannah, Georgia 2009
- Sumptin' to See: Native Son Comes Home – New Orleans African American Museum 2010
- Our History, Heritage and Culture: An American Story, the art of Ted Ellis – Rosa Parks Museum 2010
- Medicine and Art: Telling Our Story, Yale School of Medicine
