= Philadelphia Board of Education =

School board of Philadelphia, PA

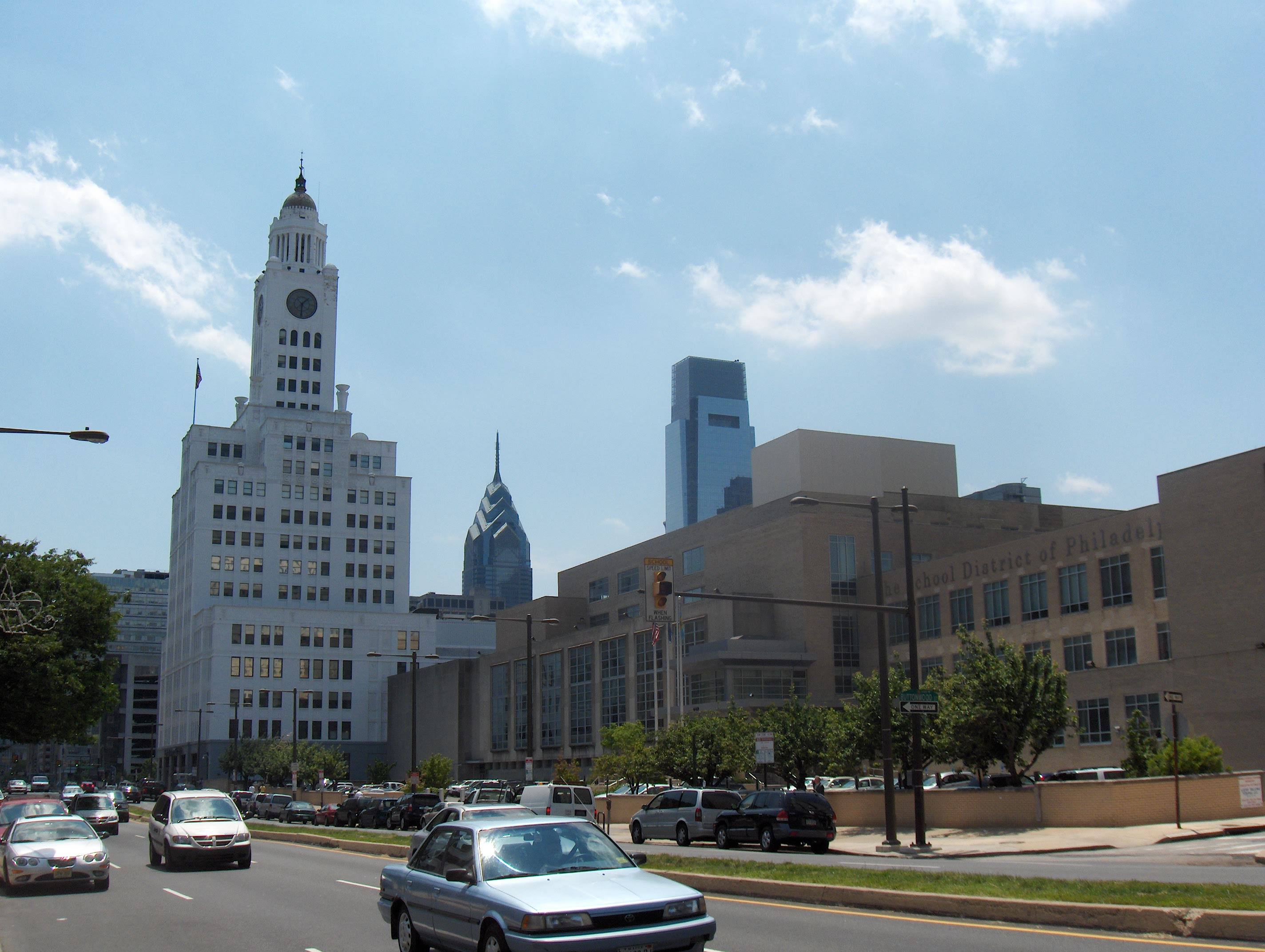
- The Constance Clayton Administration Center, the board's headquarters, at 440 North Broad Street (in the right foreground)
- Established: 1818 (as "Board of Education"); 2001 (re-established as "School Reform Commission"); 2018 (re-established as "Board of Education")
- Type: Board of education
- President: Reginald L. Streater
- Vice-president: Sarah Ashley-Andrews
- Website: https://www.philasd.org/schoolboard/

The Philadelphia Board of Education serves as the board of education (school board) for the School District of Philadelphia.

The Board was originally established in the Charter of the Erection of the District in 1818. In 2001, The Governor of Pennsylvania Mark Schweiker took control of the schools and therefore established the School Reform Commission. Governor Tom Wolf relinquished control of the district to recreate a City-run Board of Education.

The Board is appointed for a 4-year term by the Mayor of Philadelphia, and confirmed by the Philadelphia City Council. The Current Board was appointed by Cherelle Parker in 2024.

== Board Members ==
The Board is currently made up of 9 members including one president and vice president.

| Name | Title | Since |
|---|---|---|
| Reginald L. Streater, Esq. | Board President | 2021 |
| Sarah Ashley-Andrews | Board Vice President | 2022 |
| Wanda Novalés | Board Member | 2024 |
| Crystal Cubbage | Board Member | 2024 |
| Cheryl Harper | Board Member | 2024 |
| Whitney Jones | Board Member | 2024 |
| ChauWing Lam | Board Member | 2022 |
| Joan N. Stern | Board Member | 2024 |
| Joyce Wilkerson | Board Member | 2018 |

== Student Board Members ==
The Board appoints 3 Student Representatives to the Board every year to represent the 198,000 students in the District.

| Name | Title | School | Since |
|---|---|---|---|
| Jake Benny | Student Board Representative | Central High School | 2024 |
| Kenzy Ahmed | Student Board Representative | Northeast High School | 2024 |
| Charles Rinker | Student Board Representative | Franklin Learning Center | 2024 |
